= Dacia Nova =

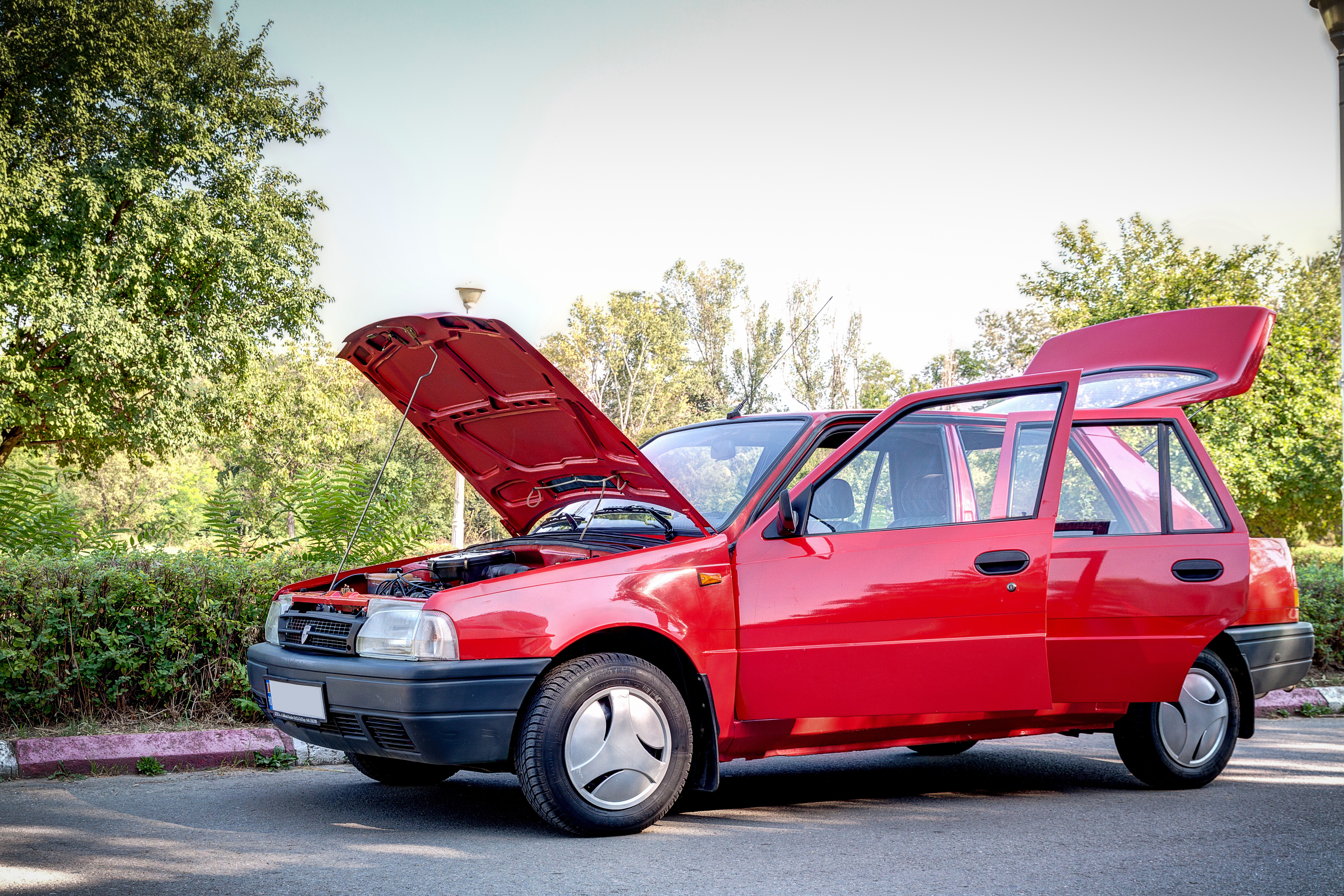

Overview
- Manufacturer: Dacia
- Production: 1995–2000
- Model years: 1995–1997 (523); 1995–2000 (524)
- Assembly: Romania: Mioveni

Body and chassis
- Class: Supermini (B)
- Body style: 5-door liftback
- Layout: FF layout

Powertrain
- Engine: 1.4 L I4; 1.6 L I4
- Transmission: 5-speed manual

Dimensions
- Wheelbase: 2,475 mm (97.4 in)
- Length: 4,030 mm (159 in)
- Width: 1,640 mm (65 in)
- Height: 1,430 mm (56 in)
- Curb weight: 940 kg (2,072 lb)

Chronology
- Successor: Dacia SupeRNova

The Dacia Nova (Romanian pronunciation: [ˈdatʃi.a]) is a supermini car manufactured by Romanian automaker Dacia from 1995 to 2000.

== History ==
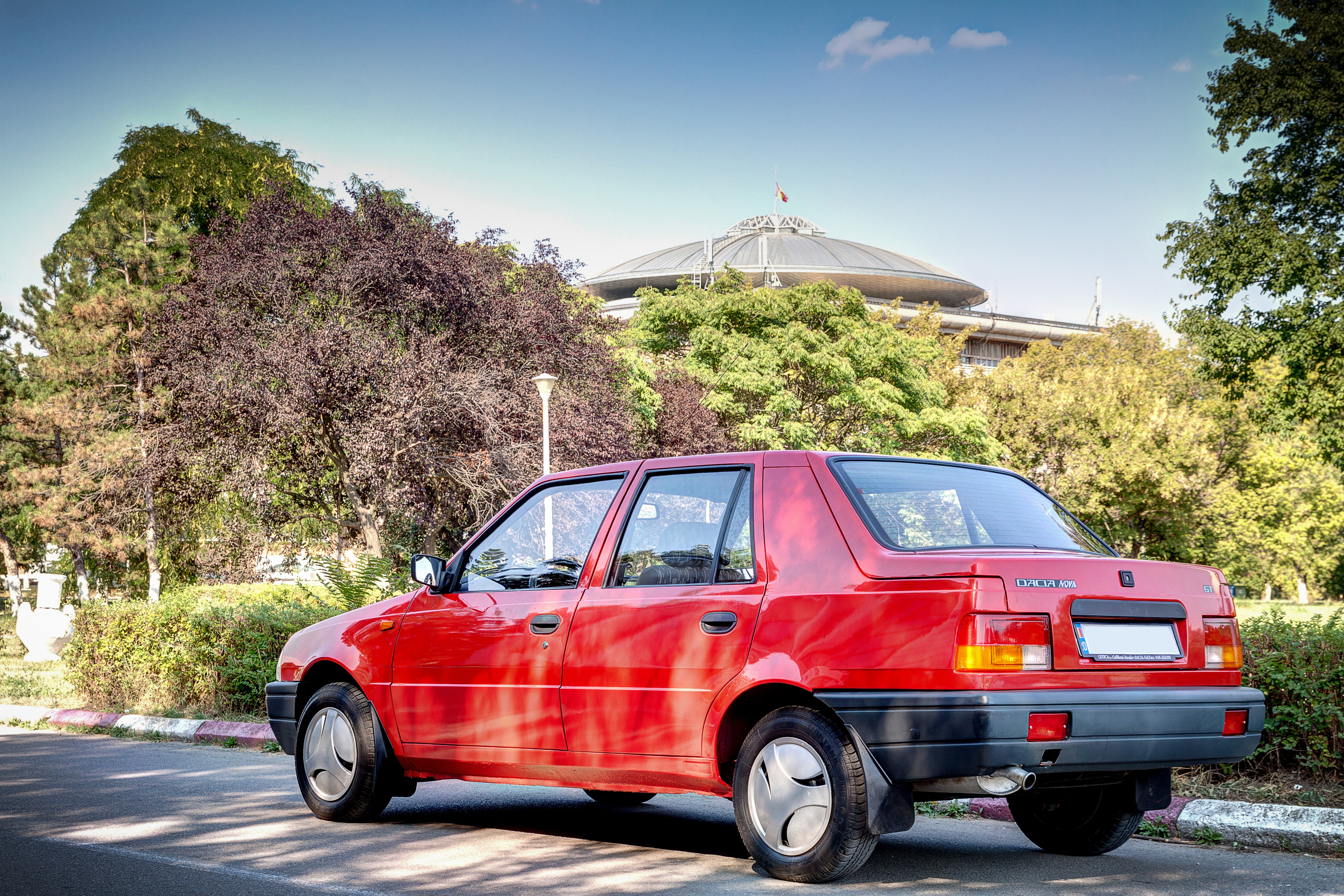
Rear view

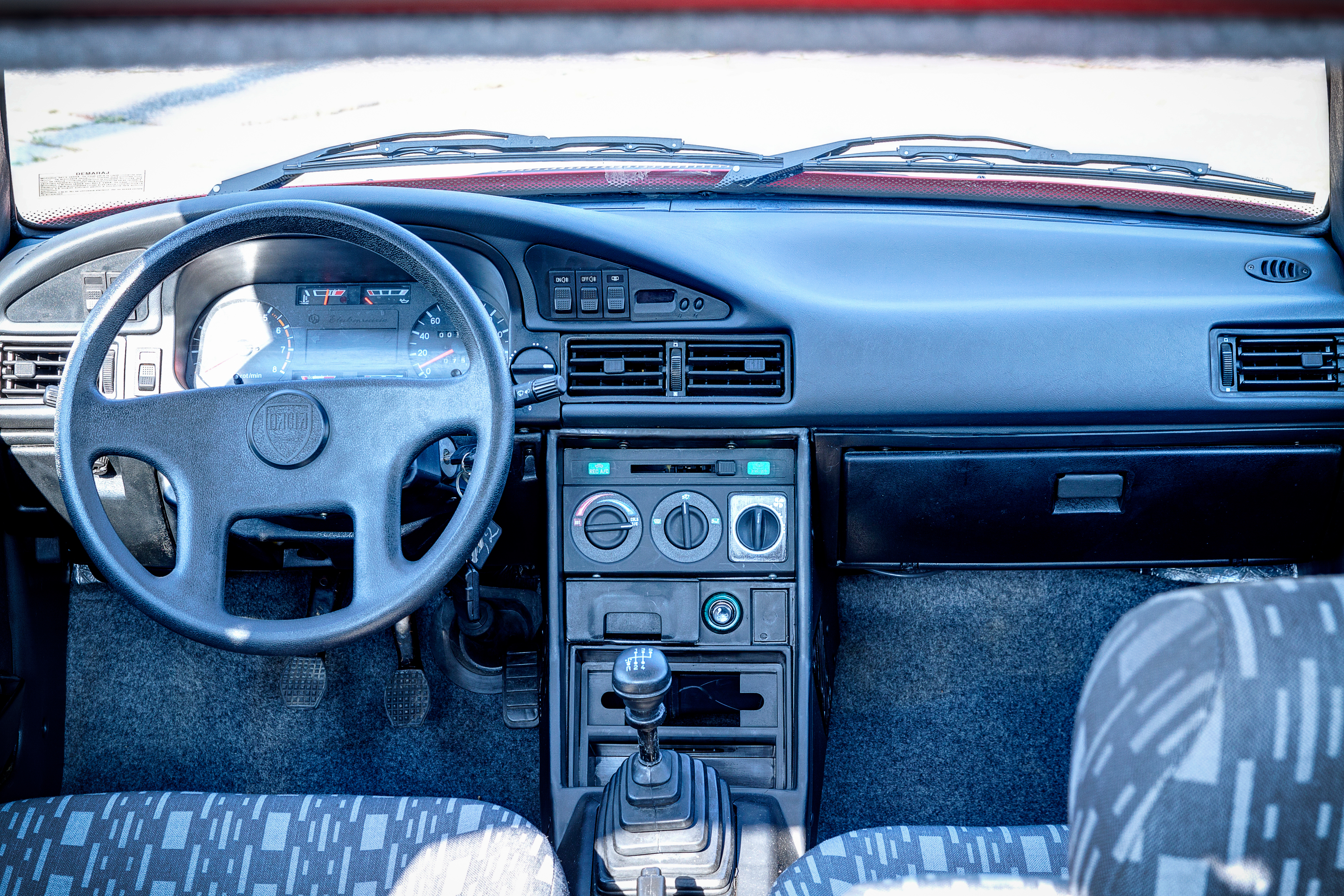
Interior

The Dacia Nova was the first in-house developed Dacia model and it was intended to complement the Renault 12-based "Berlina" (Sedan) and "Break" (Estate) range, with a small liftback/fastback. Work for this model had started in the 1980s, this being the reason why the car looked outdated from the time it first left the factory, in 1995. The next year, the more modern-looking and more popular, facelifted version was introduced.

The liftback/fastback body housed a transversely mounted, front-engined, front-wheel-drive layout, offering five doors and five seats. The engine was the old Cléon-based unit from the rest of the Dacia range, although the 1.6l GT version was fuel injected with a Bosch MonoMotronic in 1998 (hence GTi). The GT version was fueled by a double-barrelled Carfil carburettor, sourced from the Oltcit supermini, which offered very good performance but at the expense of a rather high fuel consumption.

Although more modern in every way than the classic Dacia range, bodywork quality was generally worse, there was less boot space and the Nova was more expensive. All these combined ensured that the Nova was never a bestseller in the Dacia family and not many examples survive today. It was replaced by the SupeRNova in the year 2000.

== Engines ==
Name	Capacity	Type	Power	Torque	Top speed	City consumption	Highway consumption
102-35 (Nova 1.4L)	1397 cm3	8 valves OHV	46 kW (63 PS) at 5250 rpm	102 N⋅m (75 lb⋅ft) at 3000 rpm	150 km/h (93 mph)	10 L/100 km (28 mpg_{‑imp}; 24 mpg_{‑US})	5.8 L/100 km (49 mpg_{‑imp}; 41 mpg_{‑US})
102-41 (Nova GLi)	1397 cm3	8 valves OHV	46 kW (63 PS) at 5250 rpm	102 N⋅m (75 lb⋅ft) at 3000 rpm	150 km/h (93 mph)	10 L/100 km (28 mpg_{‑imp}; 24 mpg_{‑US})	5.8 L/100 km (49 mpg_{‑imp}; 41 mpg_{‑US})
106-2x (Nova GT)	1557 cm3	8 valves OHV	54 kW (73 PS) at 5000 rpm	125 N⋅m (92 lb⋅ft) at 2500 rpm	160 km/h (99 mph)	11 L/100 km (26 mpg_{‑imp}; 21 mpg_{‑US})	6 L/100 km (47 mpg_{‑imp}; 39 mpg_{‑US})
106-30 (Nova GTi)	1557 cm3	8 valves OHV	54 kW (73 PS) at 5000 rpm	125 N⋅m (92 lb⋅ft) at 2500 rpm	165 km/h (103 mph)	10 L/100 km (28 mpg_{‑imp}; 24 mpg_{‑US})	6 L/100 km (47 mpg_{‑imp}; 39 mpg_{‑US})

== See also ==
- Dacia SupeRNova
- Dacia Solenza
