= Dacia SupeRNova =

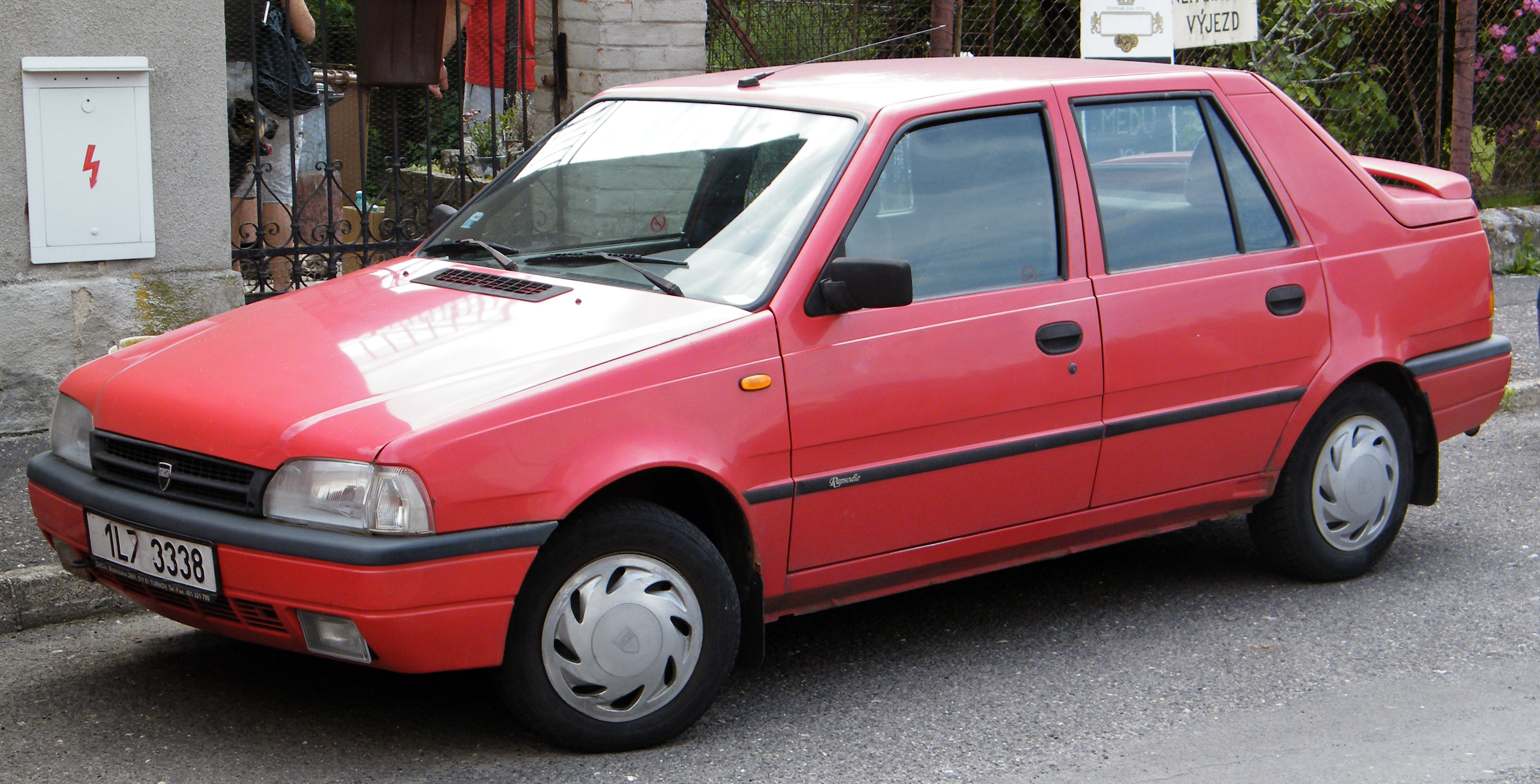

Overview
- Manufacturer: Dacia
- Production: 2000–2003
- Assembly: Romania: Mioveni; Ukraine: Zaporizhia (ZAZ)

Body and chassis
- Class: Supermini (B)
- Body style: 5-door liftback
- Layout: FF layout
- Platform: Dacia Nova

Powertrain
- Engine: 1.4 L I4
- Transmission: 5-speed manual

Dimensions
- Wheelbase: 2,475 mm (97.4 in)
- Length: 4,030 mm (159 in)
- Width: 1,640 mm (65 in)
- Height: 1,390 mm (55 in)
- Curb weight: 950 kg (2,090 lb)

Chronology
- Predecessor: Dacia Nova
- Successor: Dacia Solenza

The Dacia SupeRNova (Romanian pronunciation: [ˈdatʃi.a]) is a supermini car manufactured by Romanian auto manufacturer Dacia from 2000 to 2003.

== History ==
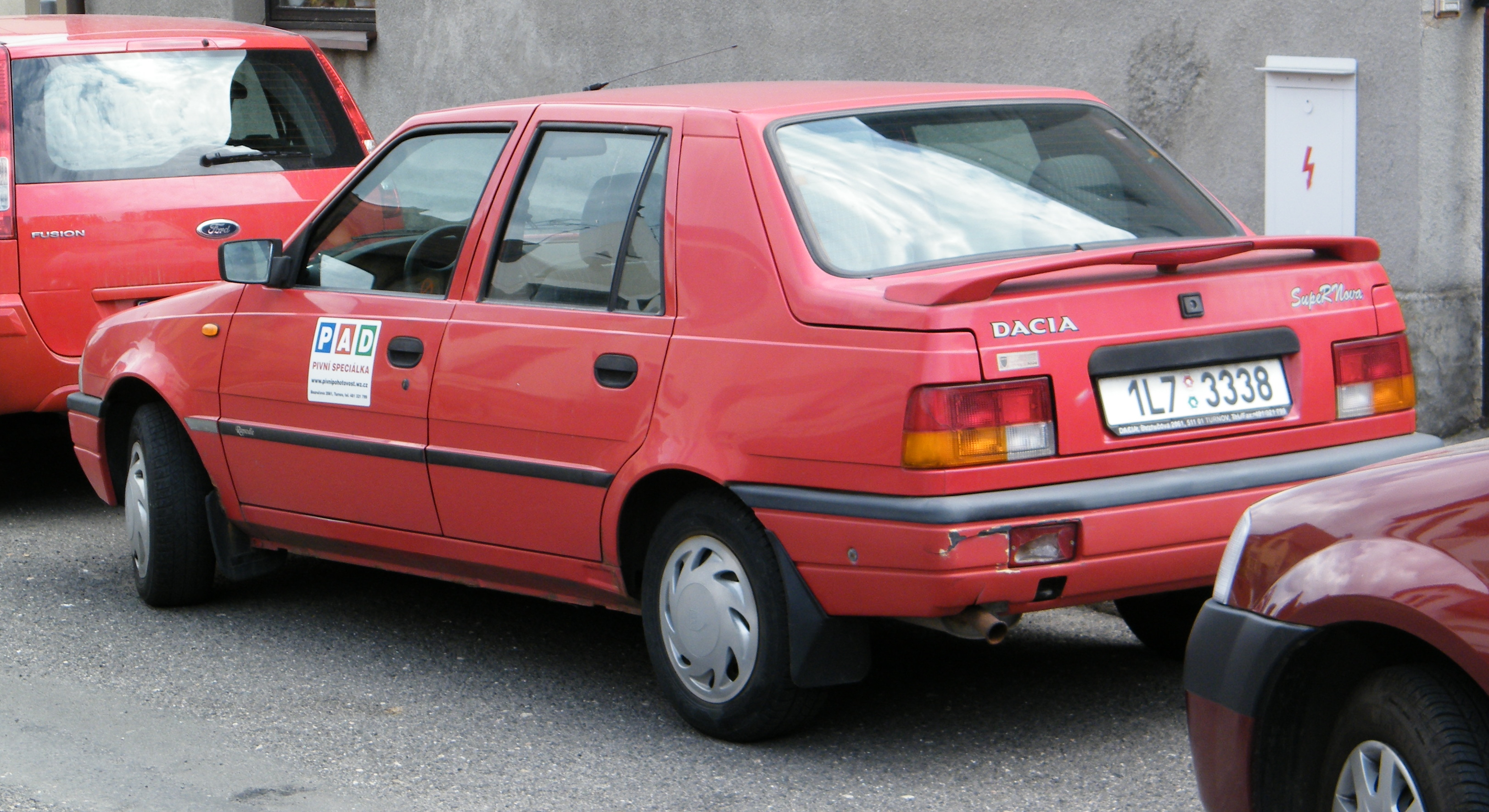
Rear

Just like its predecessor, the Dacia Nova, it was a transversely mounted, front-engined compact car with a liftback body and a front wheel drive layout. The SupeRNova, itself a facelift of the Nova, was the first model Automobile Dacia released after the company had been taken over by Renault, in 1999. The improvements over the Nova model consisted of a new 1.4l "Energy" Renault engine and a new gearbox, replacing the old Cleon-Fonte based unit and Romanian-designed gearbox.

The new engine was the catalyzed and multi-port injected version of the E7J inline-four, joined to a five-speed JH3 manual gearbox. Equipment was better than it had been in the Nova model, as air conditioning, alloy wheels, and electric front windows were available for the more upmarket versions. The Dacia SupeRNova was sold in five different trim levels: "Europa", the base model, which lacked things such as a rev counter, "Confort", "Rapsodie", "Campus", introduced in mid-2002 as a sportier model, and the top version, "Clima", with air-conditioning as standard. The car was Euro 2 emission regulation compliant, as regulations for domestically produced automobiles required. Some of the 2003 versions were Euro 3 compliant.

== Engines ==
Name	Capacity	Type	Power	Torque	Top speed	Acceleration 0–100 km/h (0–62 mph)	City consumption	Highway consumption
E7J; 1.4 MPI	1390 cc	8 valves SOHC	75 PS (55 kW; 74 hp) at 5250 rpm	114 N⋅m (84 lb⋅ft) at 2800 rpm	162 km/h (101 mph)	13 s	7.9 L/100 km (36 mpg_{‑imp}; 30 mpg_{‑US})	6.0 L/100 km (47 mpg_{‑imp}; 39 mpg_{‑US})
