= Dacia Solenza =

Subcompact liftback

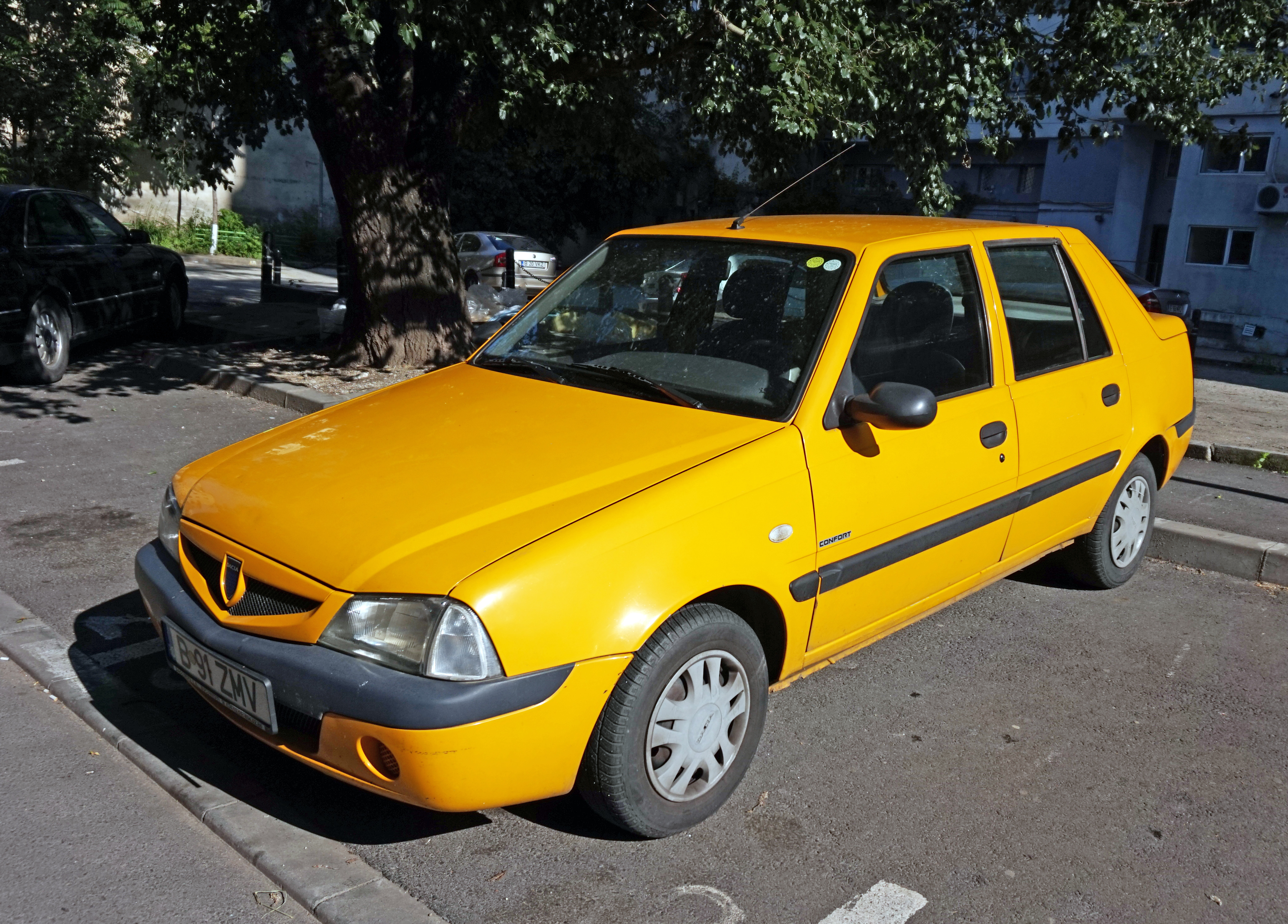

Overview
- Manufacturer: Dacia
- Production: March 2003 – July 2005
- Assembly: Romania: Mioveni; Ukraine: Zaporizhia (ZAZ)

Body and chassis
- Class: Supermini
- Body style: 5-door liftback
- Layout: Front-engine, front-wheel-drive
- Related: Renault Clio II

Powertrain
- Engine: 1.4 L E7J I4 (gasoline); 1.9 L F8Q I4 (diesel)
- Transmission: 5-speed manual

Dimensions
- Wheelbase: 2,476 mm (97.5 in)
- Length: 4,083 mm (160.7 in)
- Width: 1,664 mm (65.5 in)
- Height: 1,379 mm (54.3 in)
- Curb weight: 1,035 kg (2,282 lb)

Chronology
- Predecessor: Dacia SupeRNova
- Successor: Dacia Sandero; Dacia Logan

The Dacia Solenza is a subcompact/supermini liftback automobile produced by Romanian auto manufacturer Dacia from March 2003 to July 2005. It was the last model on Dacia's own platform, but was one of the first models to benefit from Dacia's takeover by the French company Renault.

== History ==
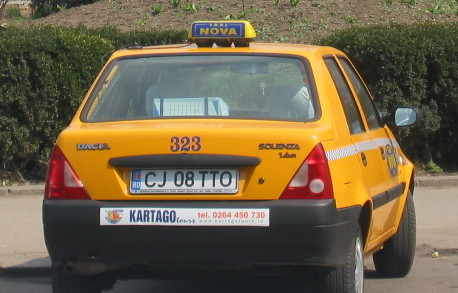
Dacia Solenza rear

The Dacia Solenza is a small liftback produced from 2003 to 2005. It was a reshaped version of the Dacia SupeRNova, which in turn was an improved version of the Dacia Nova. Production of the Solenza ceased in 2005, when the Dacia Logan was introduced.

The Solenza was initially developed in five versions, depending on its features: Europa, Confort, Rapsodie, Clima and Scala. The top version was Scala, which included air conditioning, power steering, alloy wheels, driver airbag, electric windows, a CD player and many other features known for the first time on a Dacia car. The air conditioning was not available with the diesel engine because they were not compatible, so the top version for the diesel range was designated Avantage. A no frills version called Europa was introduced in 2004, lacking window tint, painted bumpers, side moldings or tachometer. The car shared engines, gearbox and several interior parts with the second generation Renault Clio. It was released with a 1.4-litre petrol and a 1.9-litre Diesel engine.

== Engines ==
Name	Capacity	Type	Power	Torque	Top speed	Acceleration 0–100 km/h (0-62 mph)	City consumption	Highway consumption
E7J; 1.4 MPI	1390 cc	8 valves SOHC	75 hp (56 kW; 76 PS) at 5250 rpm	114 N⋅m (84 lb⋅ft) at 2800 rpm	165 km/h (103 mph)	13.1 s	8.5 L/100 km (33 mpg_{‑imp}; 28 mpg_{‑US})	5.6 L/100 km (50 mpg_{‑imp}; 42 mpg_{‑US})
F8Q; 1.9 Diesel	1870 cc	8 valves SOHC	63 hp (47 kW; 64 PS) at 4500 rpm	120 N⋅m (89 lb⋅ft) at 2250 rpm	155 km/h (96 mph)	16.9 s	5.2 L/100 km (54 mpg_{‑imp}; 45 mpg_{‑US})	4.7 L/100 km (60 mpg_{‑imp}; 50 mpg_{‑US})

== Gallery ==
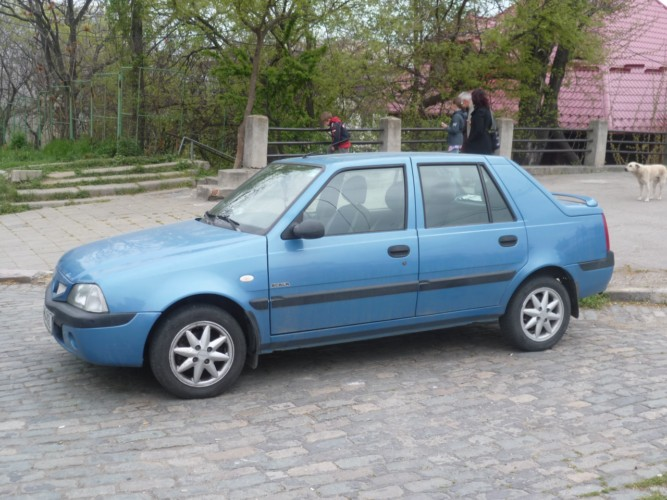
Dacia Solenza (Scala)

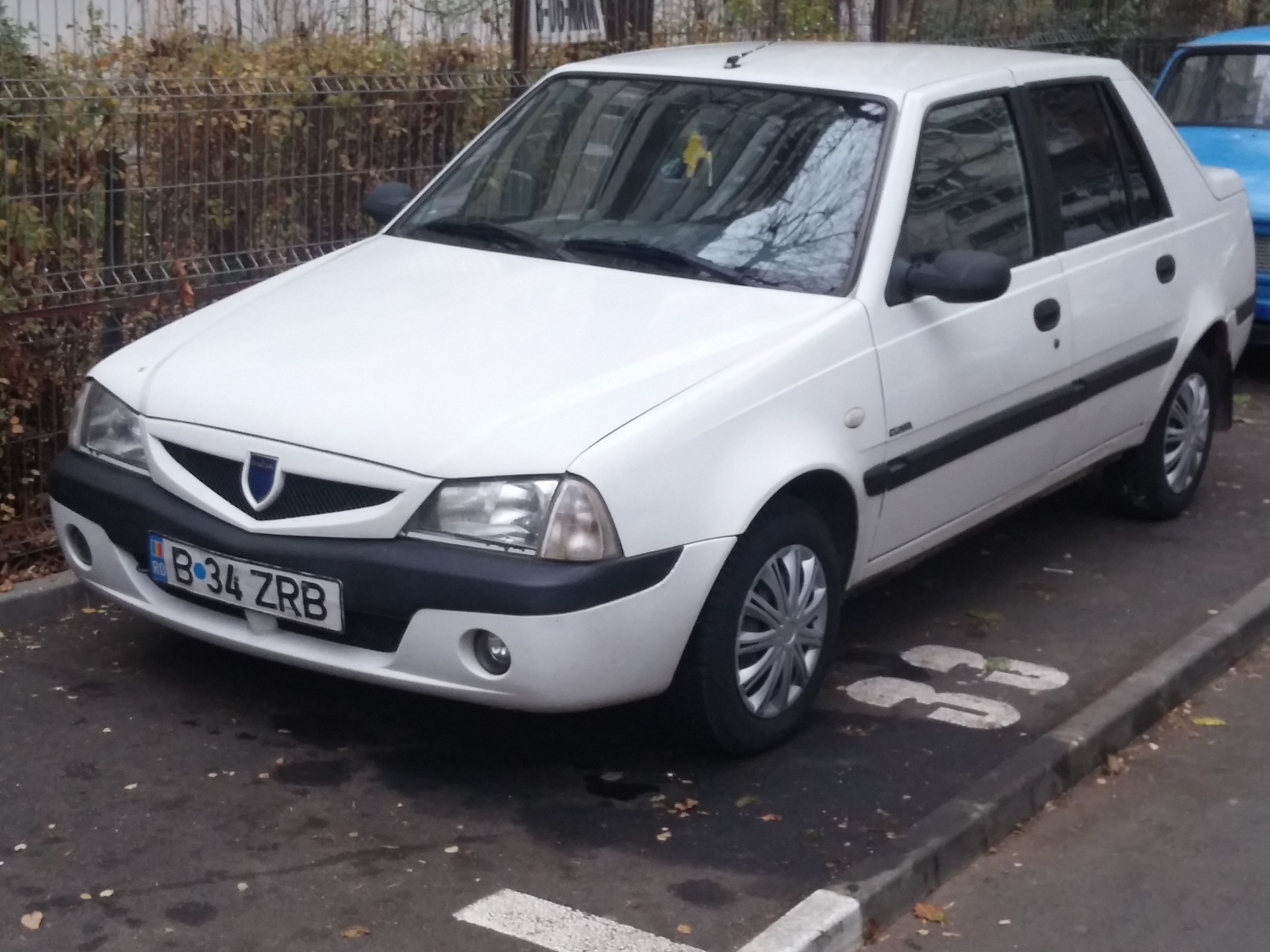
Dacia Solenza (Clima)

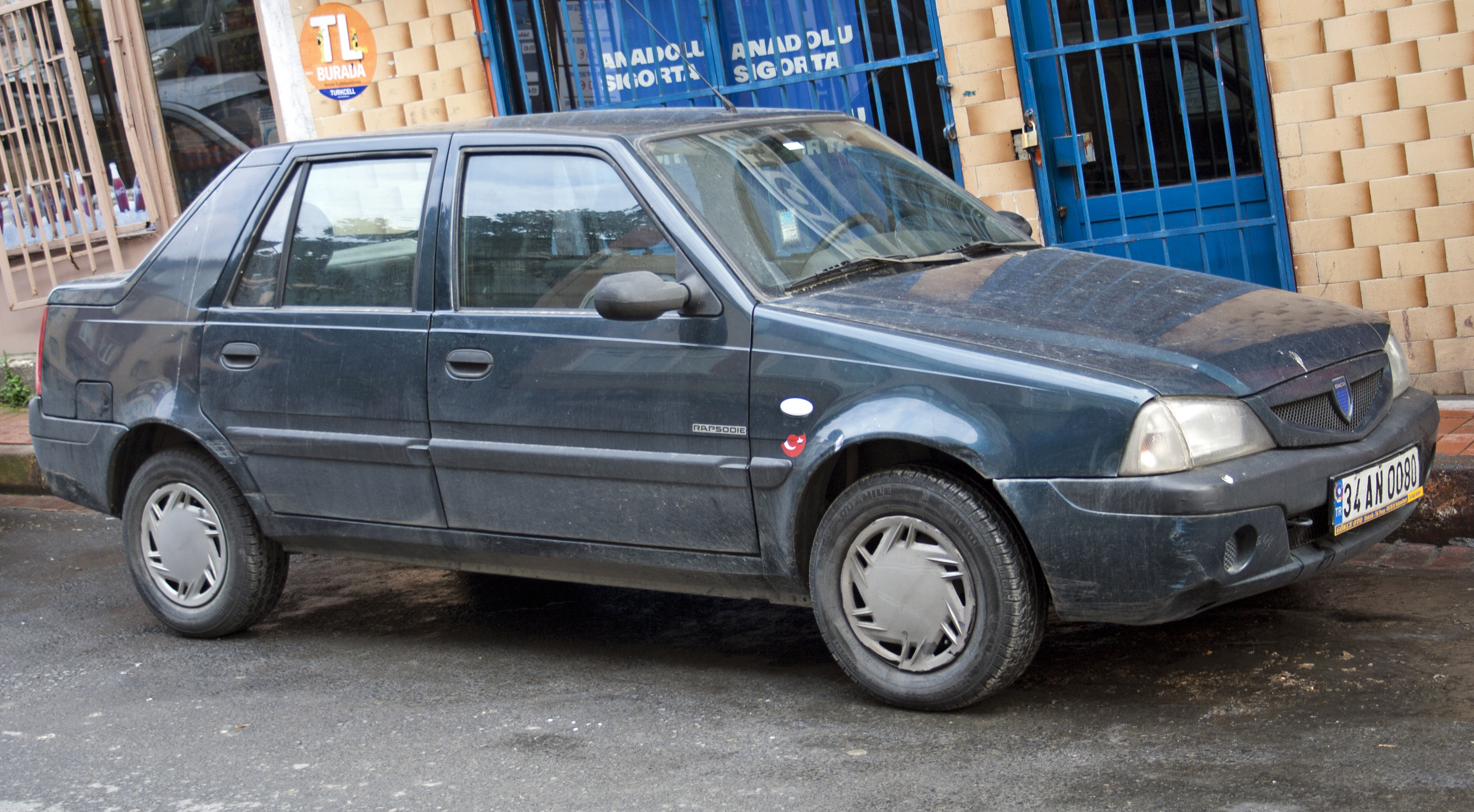
Dacia Solenza (Rapsodie)

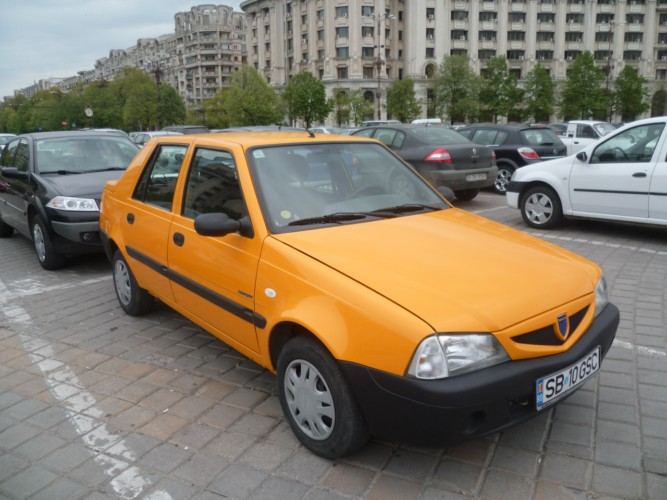
Dacia Solenza (Confort)

== See also ==
- Dacia SupeRNova
- Dacia Nova
