= Dacia Pick-Up =

Range of pick-up trucks

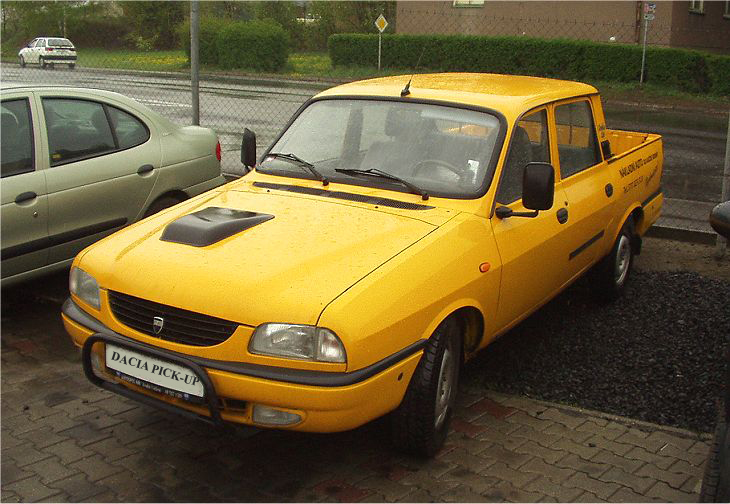

Overview
- Manufacturer: Dacia
- Also called: Dacia One Ton (United Kingdom); Dacia Shifter (United Kingdom); Dacia Gamma (2000s); Dacia Familia (Double Cab)
- Production: 1975–2006
- Model years: 1975–1982 (1302) (Note: Dacia 1302 – 1975–1982); 1982–2006 (1304 Pick Up) (Note: Dacia 1304 Pick Up – 1982–1983, 1984–1991, 1992–1993, 1994–1998, 1999–2006); 1983–2006 (1304 Drop Side) (Note: Dacia 1304 Drop Side – 1983–1991, 1992–1993, 1994–1998, 1999–2006); 1992–2006 (1307 Double Cab) (Note: Dacia 1307 Double Cab – 1992–1993, 1994–1998, 1999–2006); 1992–1998 (1309) (Note: Dacia 1309 – 1992–1993, 1994–1998); 1994–2003 (1304 King Cab) (Note: Dacia 1304 King Cab – 1994–1998, 1999–2004)
- Assembly: Romania: Mioveni
- Designer: Ionuț Velea

Body and chassis
- Class: Pick-up
- Body style: 2-door regular cab 2-door chassis cab 2-door king cab 4-door double cab 4-door short bed
- Layout: Front-engine, front-wheel-drive, rear-wheel-drive or four-wheel-drive
- Related: Dacia 1310

Powertrain
- Engine: 1.3 L I4 (petrol); 1.4 L I4 (petrol); 1.6 L I4 (petrol); 1.9 L I4 (diesel)
- Transmission: 4/5-speed manual

Dimensions
- Wheelbase: 2,441 mm (96.1 in) (1302/1309); 2,675 mm (105.3 in) (1304); 2,795 mm (110.0 in) (1307)
- Length: 4,674 mm (184.0 in) (Pick Up); 4,599 mm (181.1 in) (Drop Side); 4,794 mm (188.7 in) (Double Cab)
- Width: 1,636 mm (64.4 in)
- Height: 1,550 mm (61 in)
- Curb weight: 1,125–1,270 kg (2,480–2,800 lb)

Chronology
- Successor: Dacia Logan Pick-Up

The Dacia Pick-Up was a range of pick-up trucks manufactured by Romanian auto marque Dacia from 1975 to 2006. A total of 318,969 vehicles were manufactured in 31 years of production.

The Pick-up was the last of the Dacia models to be based on the Renault 12 that made up the majority of the Dacia model range since the late 1960s. In 2006, the line was discontinued and replaced by Dacia Logan Pick-Up. A popular name for this car is the "Papuc" which translates to, slipper due to its shape that resembles a slipper.

== History ==
The Dacia Pick-Up was derived from the Dacia 1300 platform and was introduced in 1975. First known as the Dacia 1302, it was made in three series: the first, with straight rear wings and a small rear window; the second, with corrugated rear wings and a small rear window; and the third, with corrugated rear wings and a full-size rear window.

In 1982, after the 1302 was dropped, the Dacia 1304 single-cab pick-up model was introduced, followed by the drop-side coupé utility in 1983, the 1307/1309 double cab models in 1992; the 1305, a front-wheel drive version of the pick-up model, in 1994, and a king cab model, in 1995. These model lines were a commercial success and were gradually facelifted and modified, along with the rest of the range, until December 2006. They were marketed bearing the new blue logo of the manufacturer after 2003.

On the UK market, the Pick-Up was known as the One-Ton and, from November 1985, the Shifter.

The vehicle was available with a number of different transmission styles including front wheel drive, rear wheel drive and 4x4.

During its time in production, many types of engines were available to power the truck: a 1.3 litre, 1.4 litre, or 1.6 litre petrol engines or 1.9 litre Renault diesel engine.

== Versions ==
- Dacia 1302 – 2-door pick-up based on Dacia 1300
- Dacia 1304 Pick Up – 2-door pick-up based on Dacia 1310
- Dacia 1304 King Cab – 2-door pick-up with extended cab
- Dacia 1304 Drop Side – 2-door pick-up with hinged panels
- Dacia 1305 – front-wheel drive variant of Dacia 1304 Pick Up
- Dacia 1307 Double Cab – 4-door pick-up with crew cab and long wheelbase
- Dacia 1309 – 4-door pick-up with short bed, based on Dacia 1310 Break

=== Gallery ===
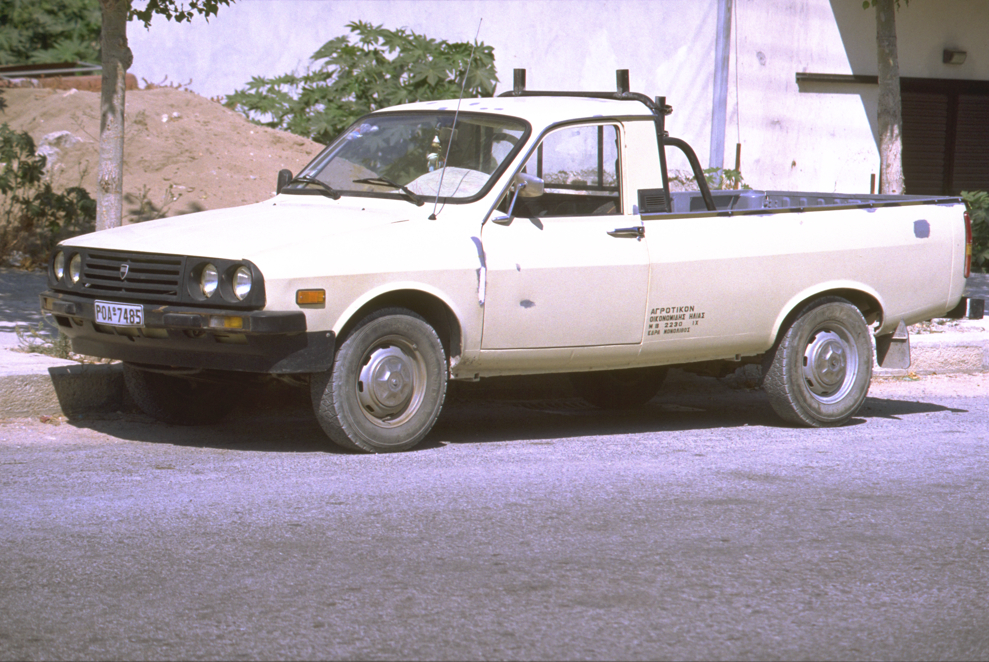
Dacia 1304 DS Pick-Up.

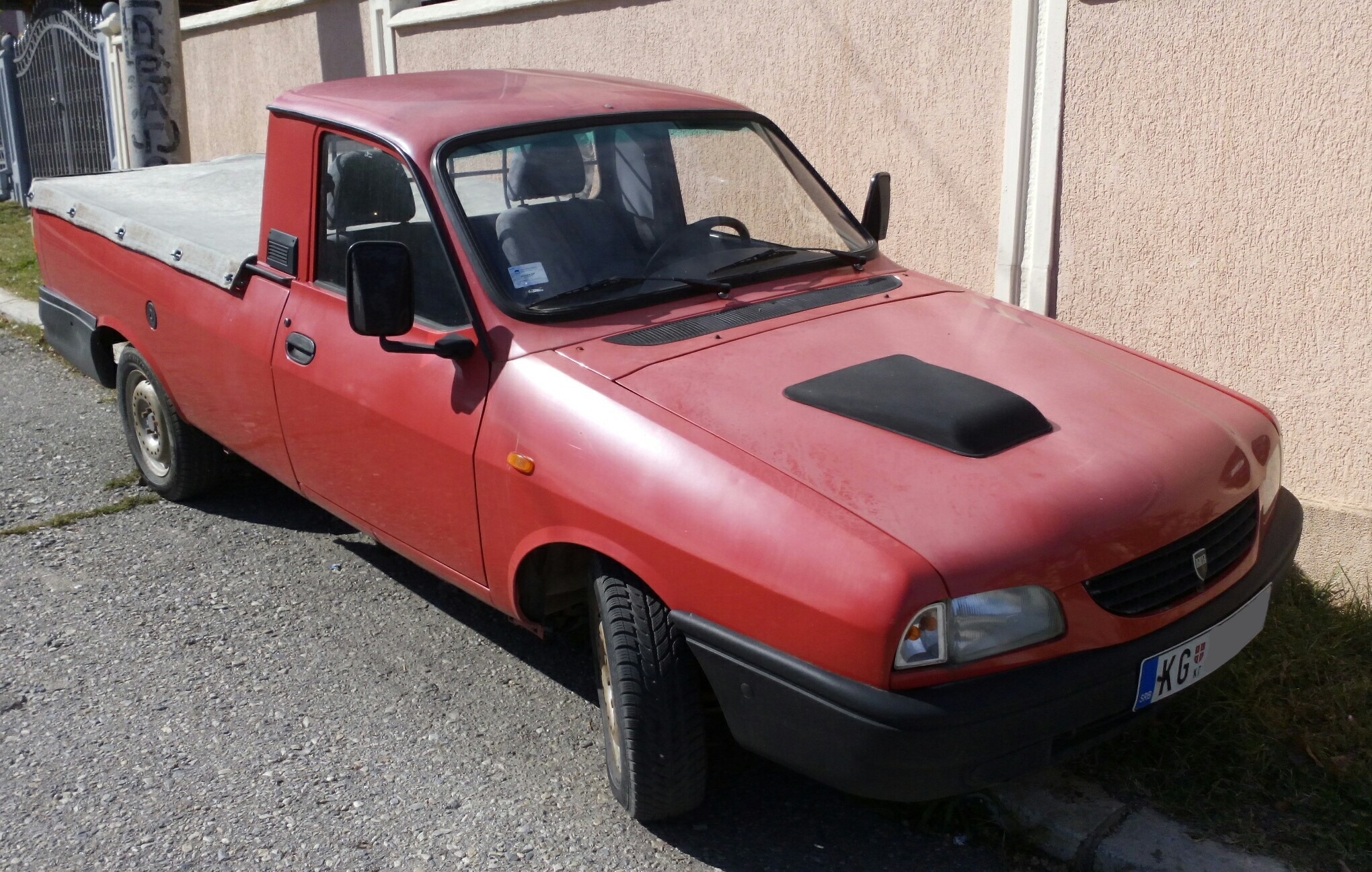
Dacia 1304 Pick-Up CN4 (Serbia)

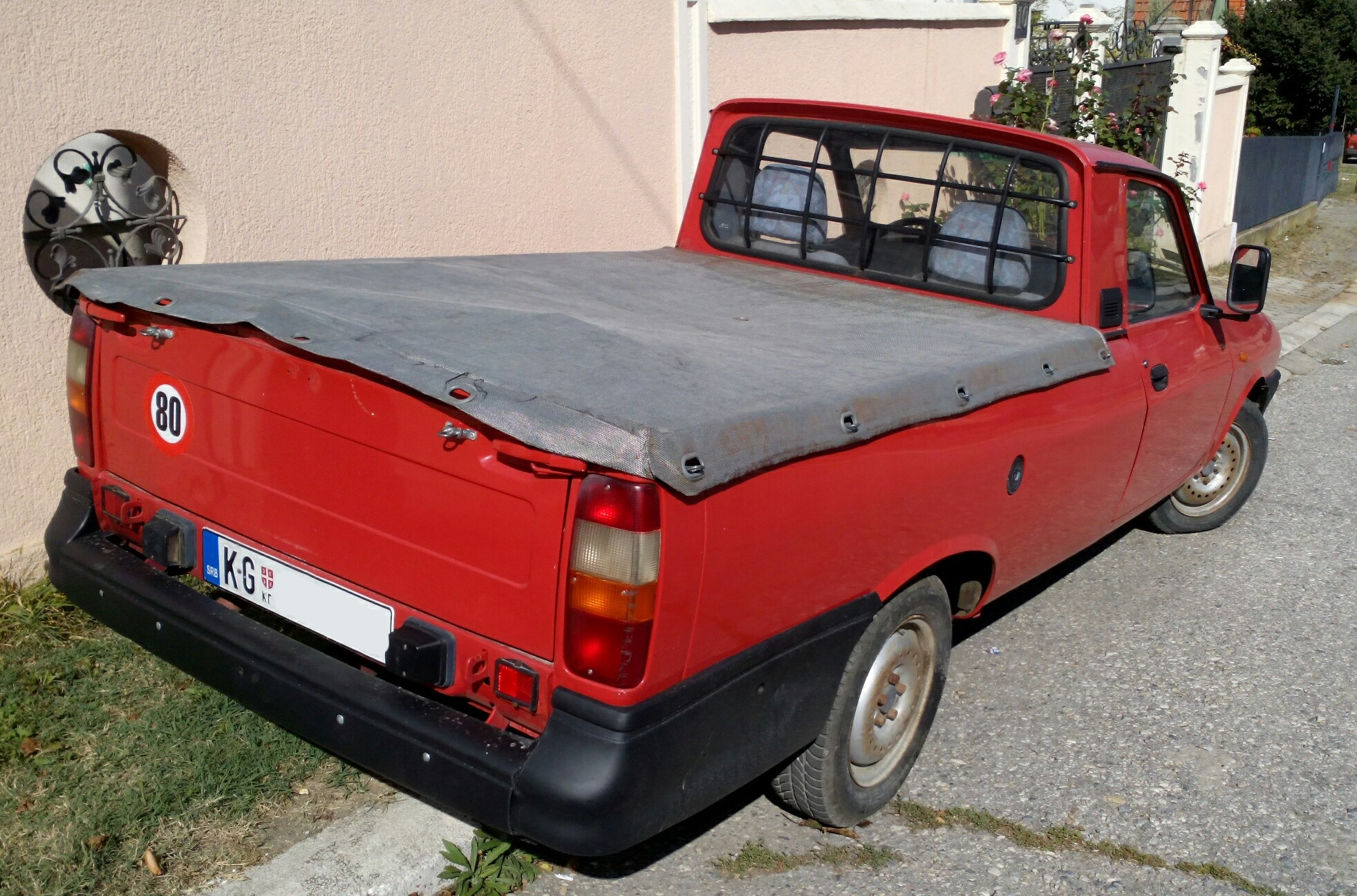
Dacia 1304 Pick-Up rear CN4 (Serbia)

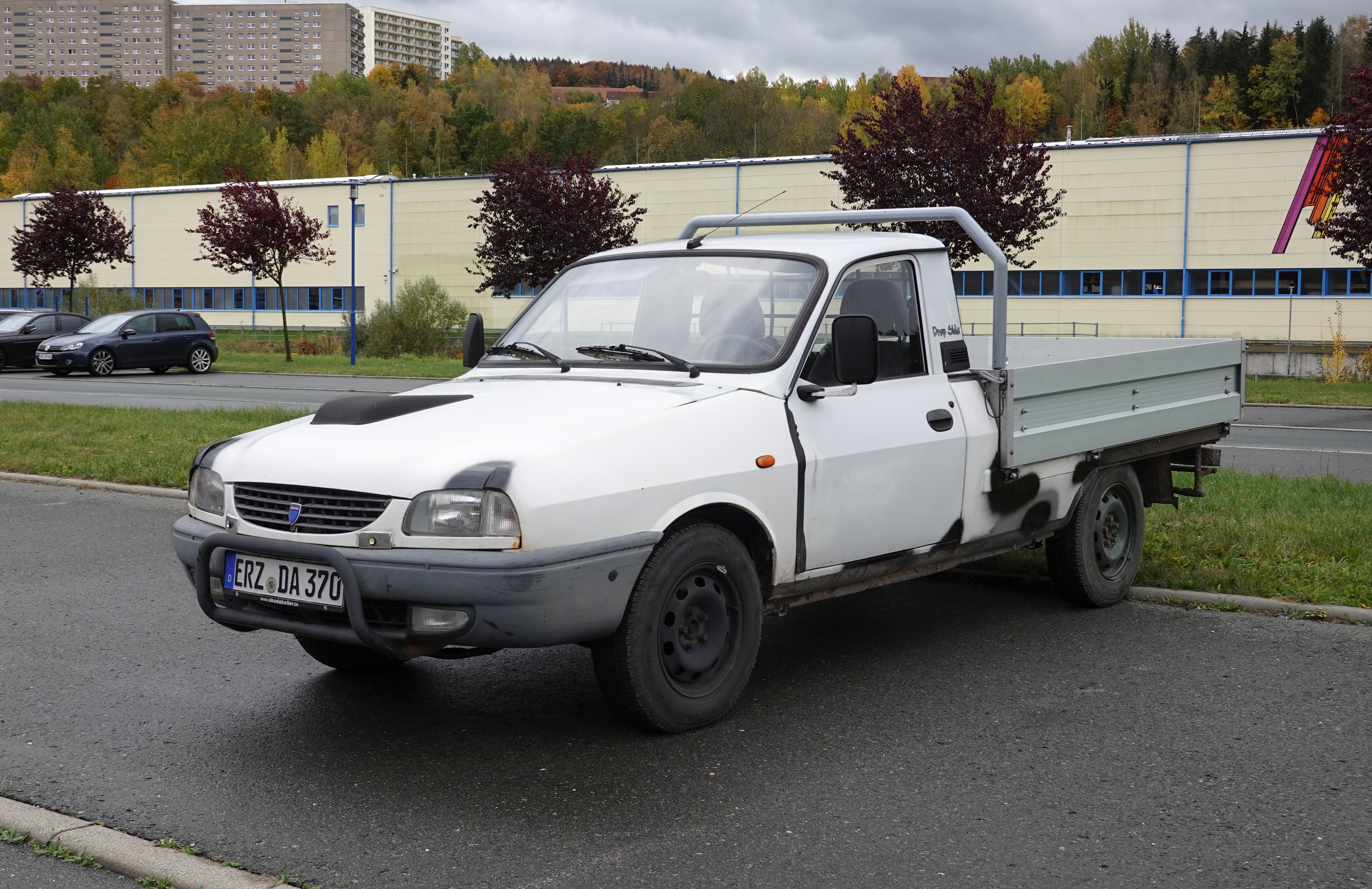
Dacia 1304 Drop Side (Germany)

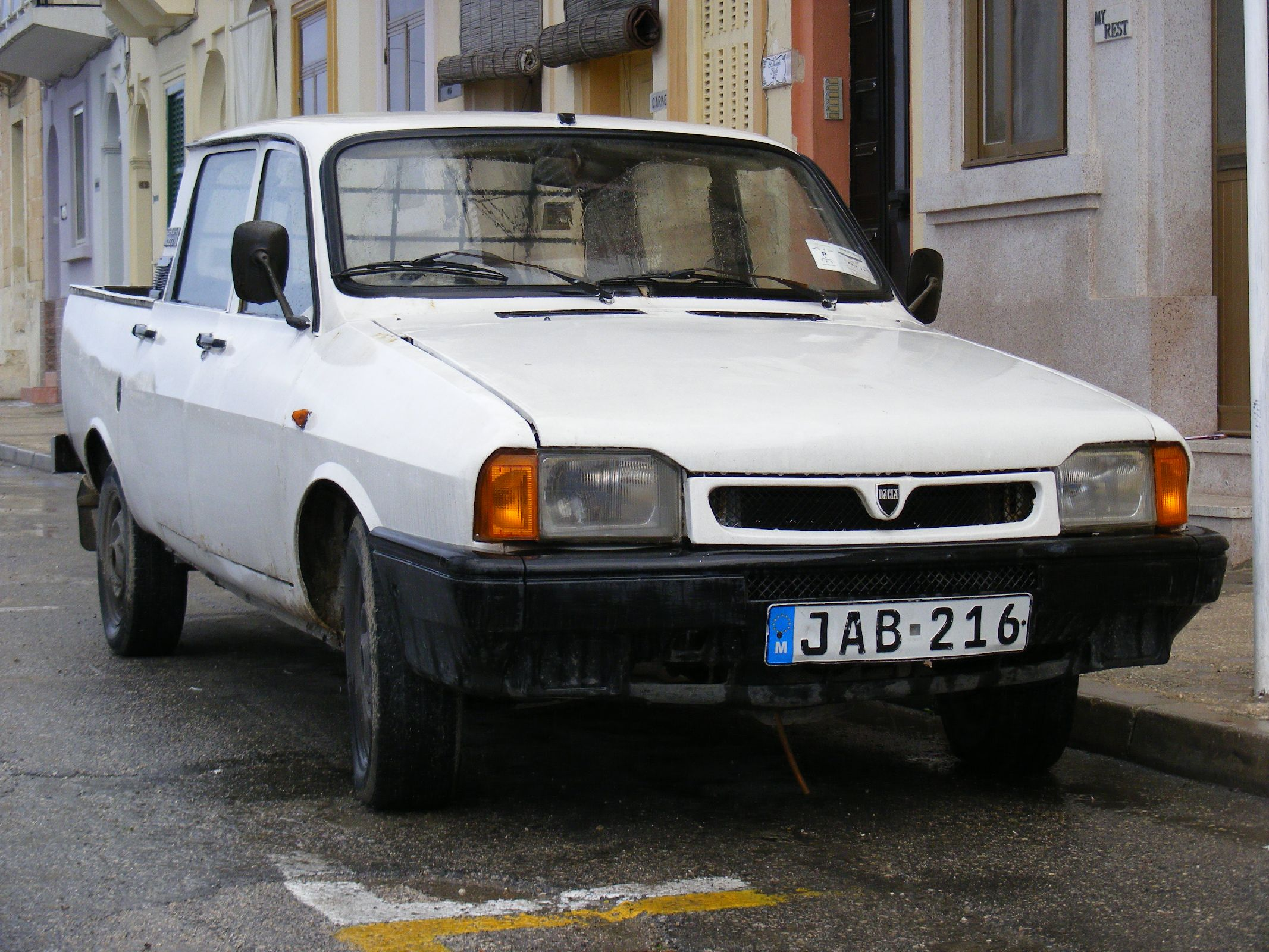
Dacia 1307 CN3 (RHD markets; Malta)

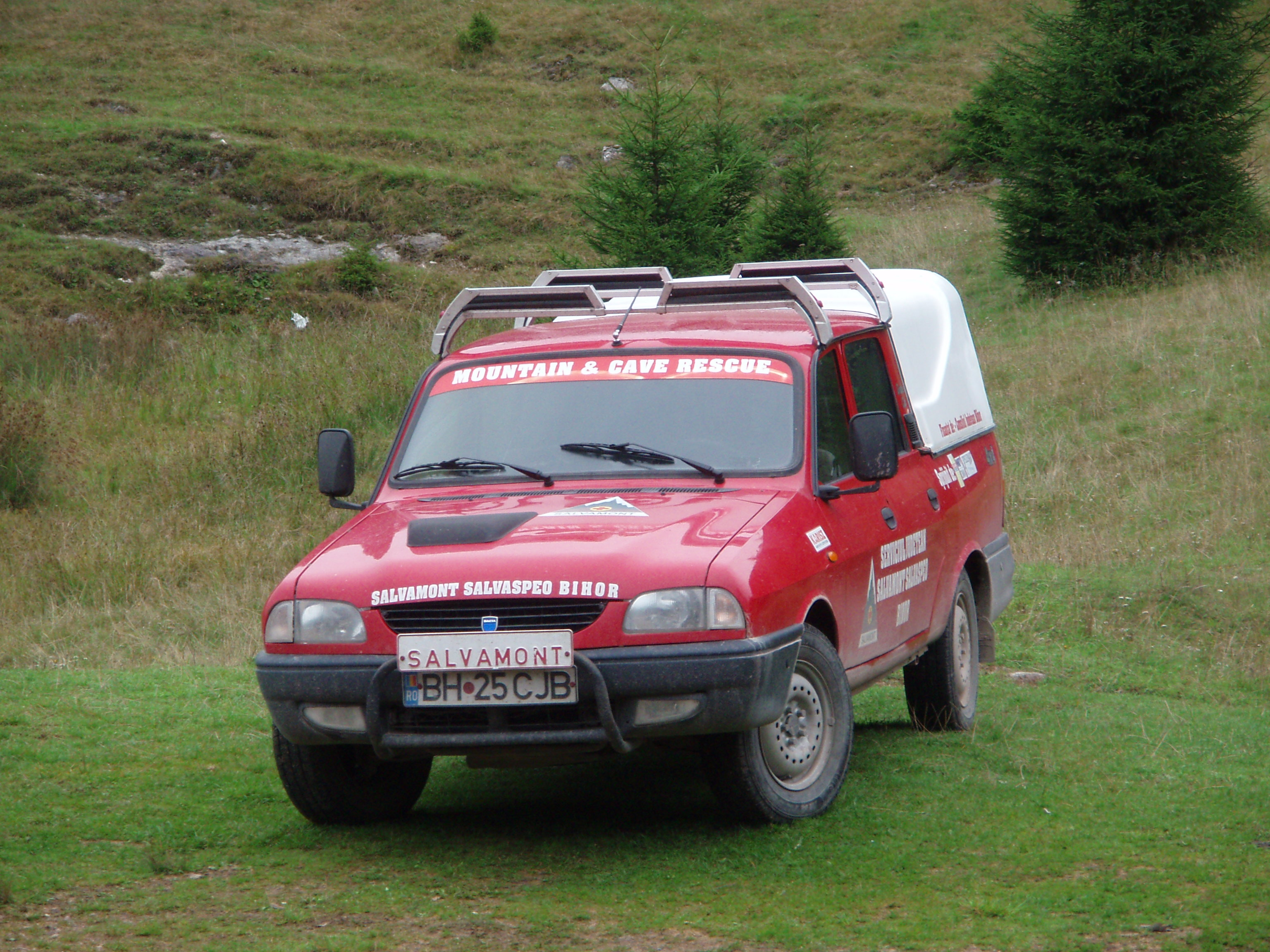
Romanian Mountain and Cave Rescue (Salvamont) Dacia 1307 Pickup

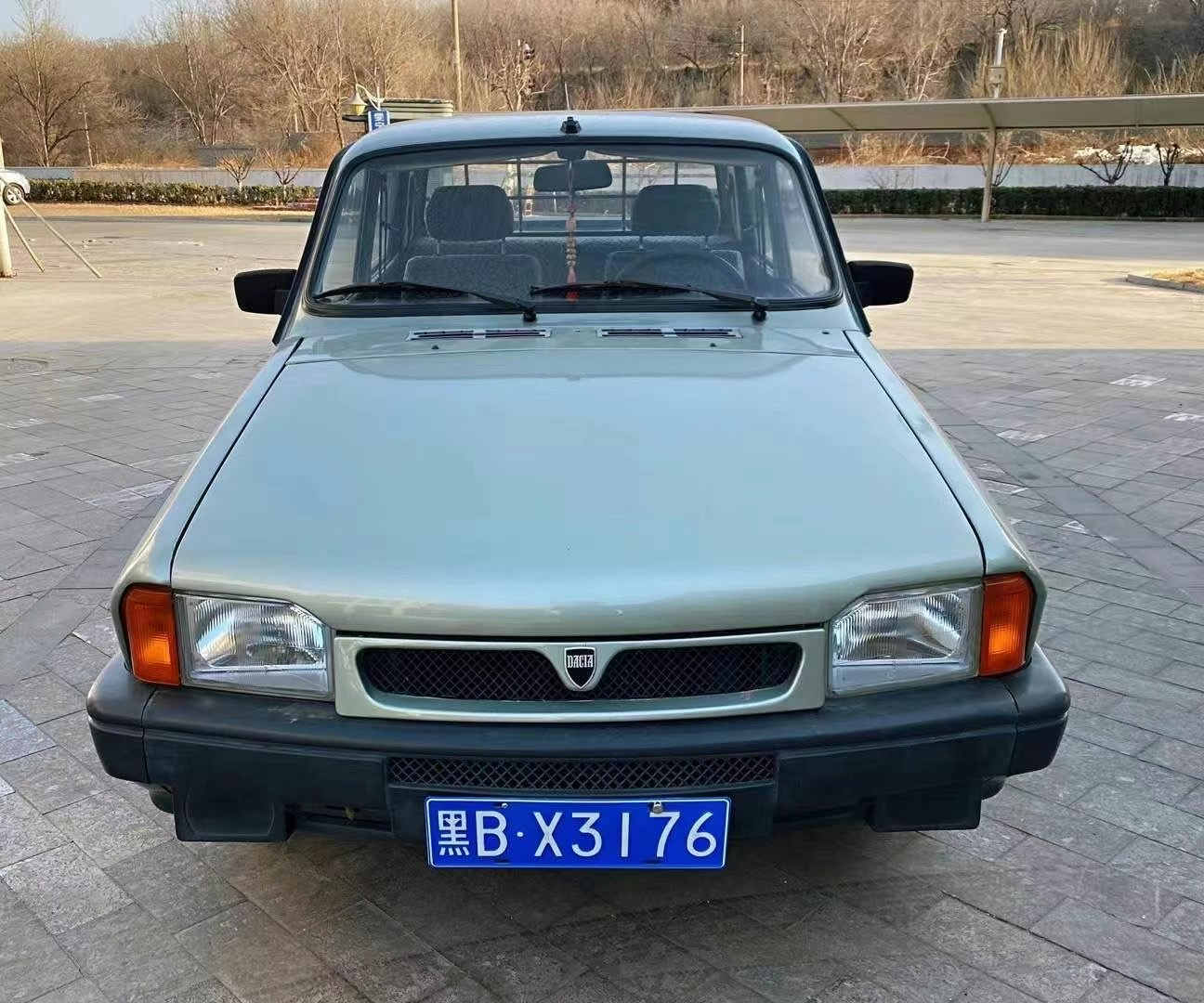
Dacia 1309 Pick-Up in China (front)

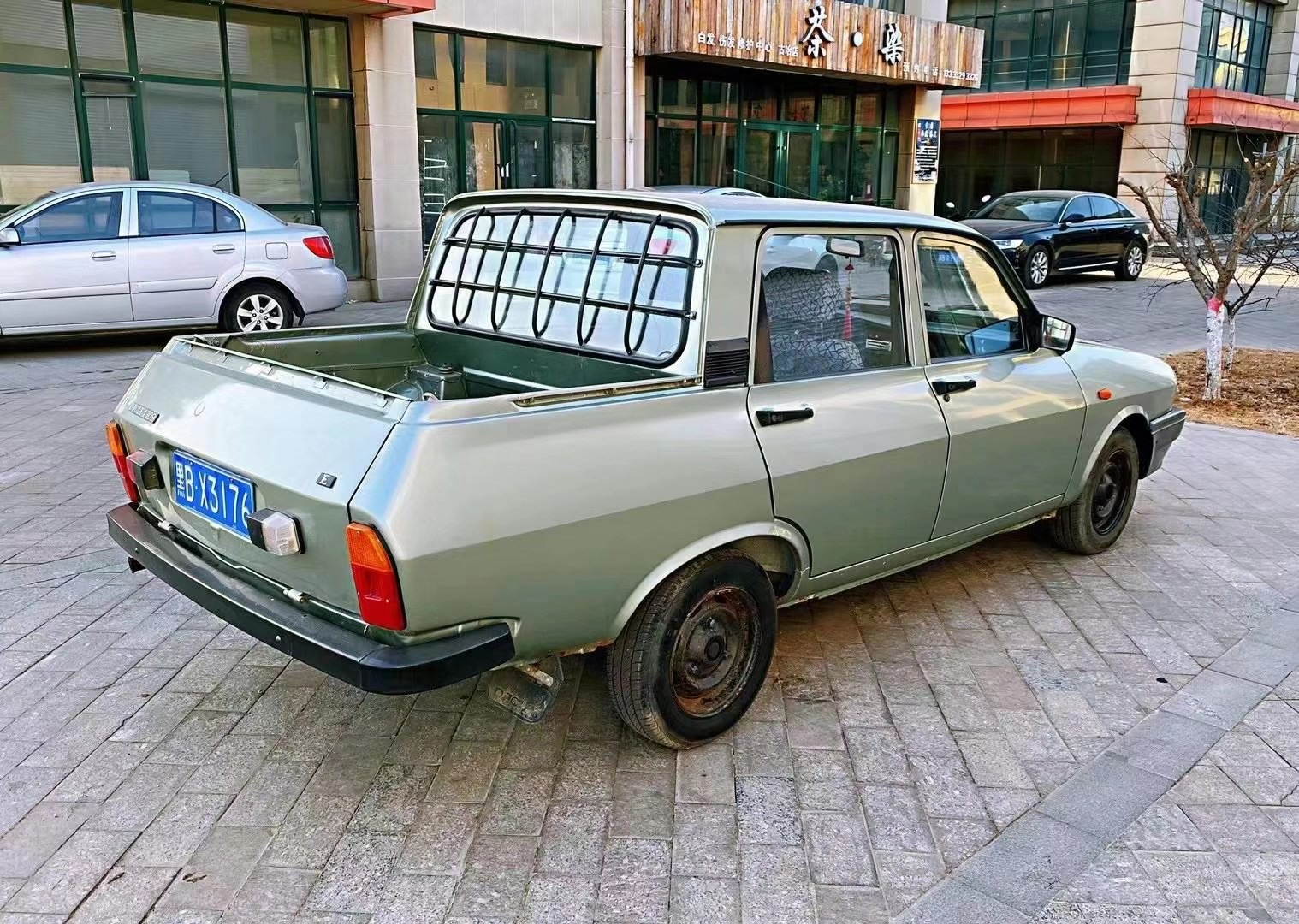
Dacia 1309 Pick-Up in China (rear)

== Engines ==
Name	Capacity	Type	Power	Torque	Top Speed	Combined consumption
810.99; 1300	1,289 cc	8 valves OHV	54 hp (40 kW; 55 PS) at 5250 rpm	95 N⋅m (70 lb⋅ft) at 3300 rpm	143 km/h (89 mph)	8 L/100 km (35 mpg_{‑imp}; 29 mpg_{‑US})
102.00; 1400	1,397 cc	8 valves OHV	62 hp (46 kW; 63 PS) at 5250 rpm	102 N⋅m (75 lb⋅ft) at 3000 rpm	145 km/h (90 mph)	7.8 L/100 km (36 mpg_{‑imp}; 30 mpg_{‑US})
1.6	1,557 cc	8 valves OHV	72 hp (54 kW; 73 PS) at 5000 rpm	122 N⋅m (90 lb⋅ft) at 2500 rpm	150 km/h (93 mph)	7.9 L/100 km (36 mpg_{‑imp}; 30 mpg_{‑US})
F8Q 636; 1.9 Diesel	1,870 cc	8 valves SOHC	63 hp (47 kW; 64 PS) at 4500 rpm	118 N⋅m (87 lb⋅ft) at 2250 rpm	138 km/h (86 mph)	6.8 L/100 km (42 mpg_{‑imp}; 35 mpg_{‑US})

== See also ==
- Dacia 1300
- Dacia Logan Pick-Up
