= Liftback =

Automotive body style

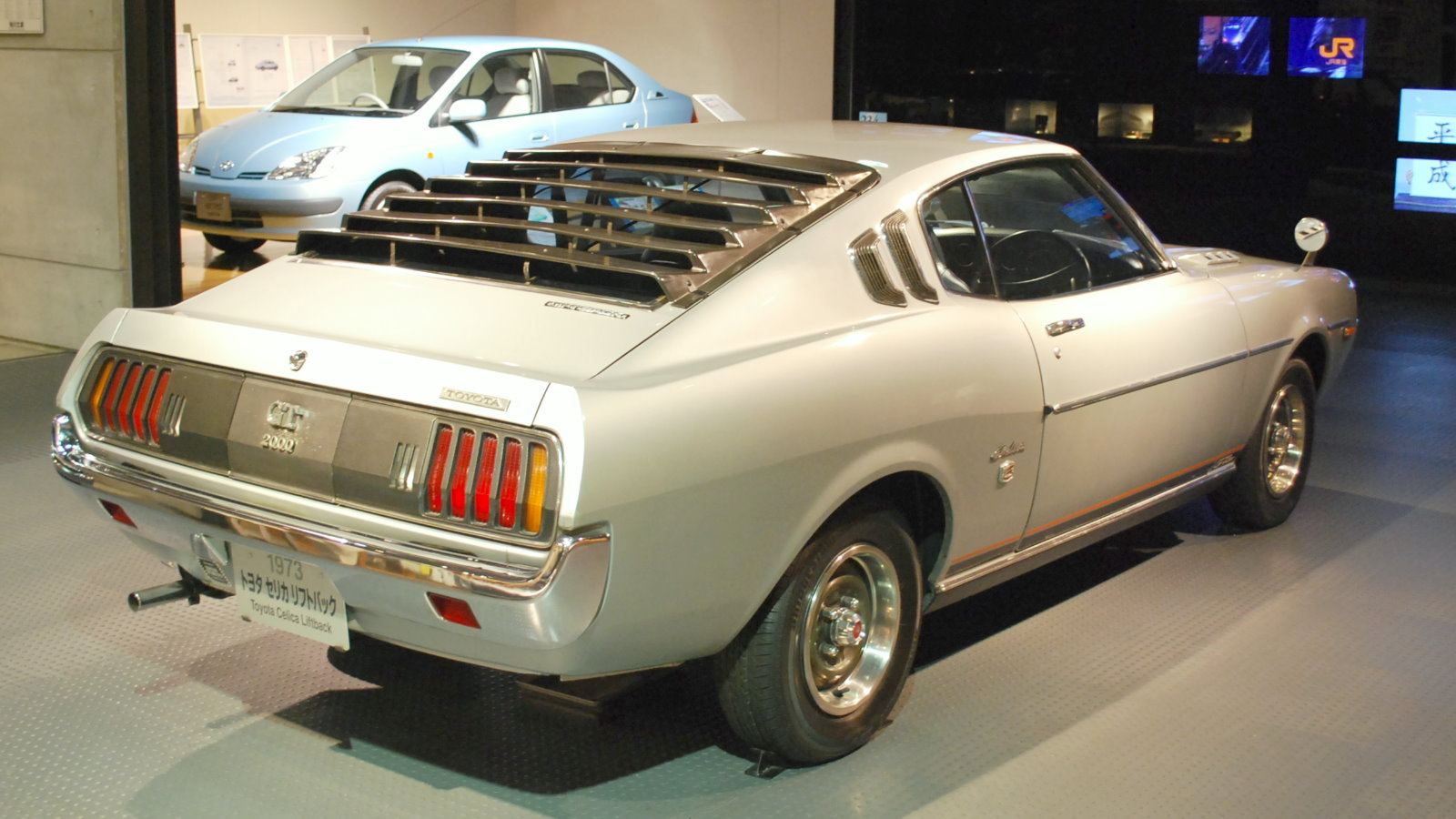
1973 Toyota Celica, one of the world's first "liftbacks", in this case a fastback-styled hatchback

The marketing term liftback describes a hatchback car body style with a rear cargo door, where the overall roof line and rear cargo door are sloped more like that of sedans or coupe — as compared to the more vertical rear cargo door of a more utilitarian hatchback or wagon. A liftback may include fold-down rear seats for increased cargo capacity, providing increased cargo flexibility vs. a conventional sedan or coupe.

== History ==
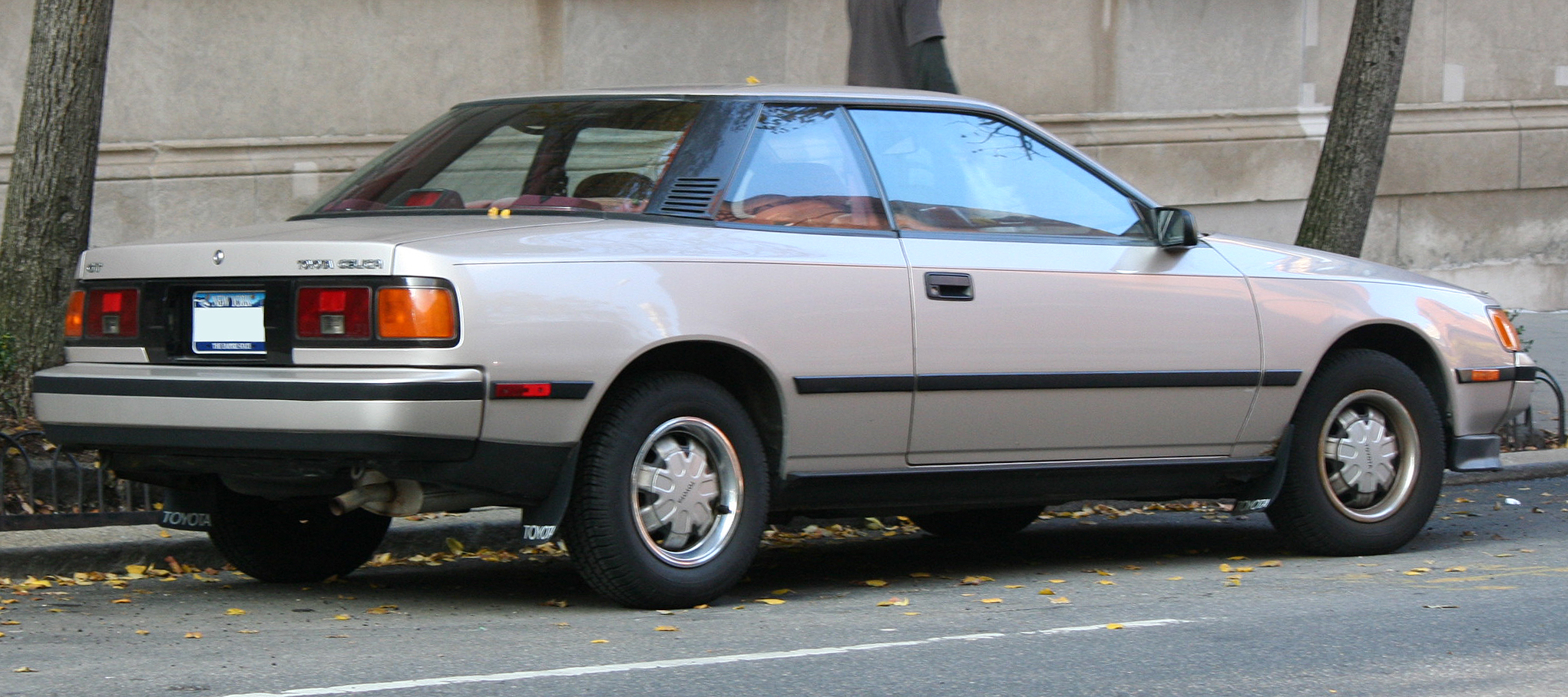
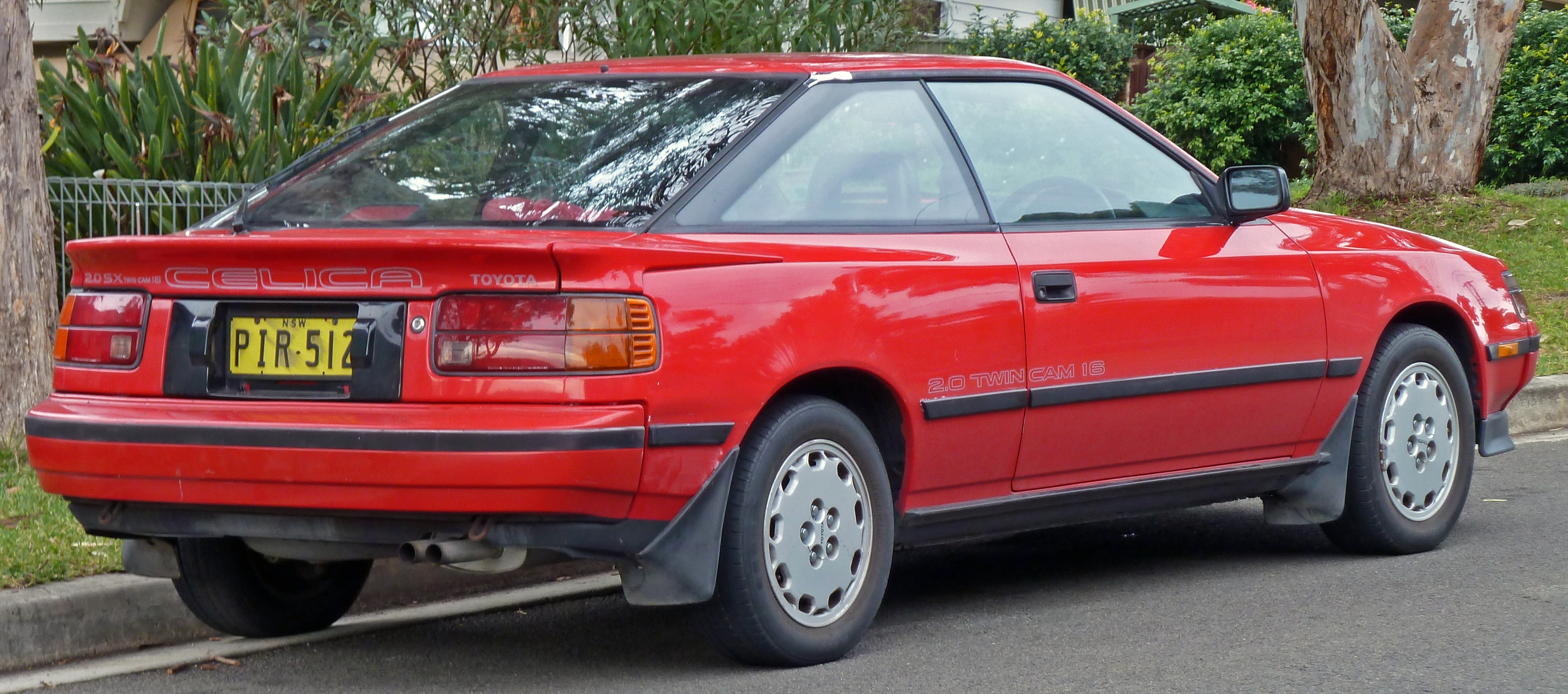
Comparison between the notchback Coupé (above) and Liftback (below) of the 4th generation Toyota Celica.

In 1973, Toyota used the marketing term, liftback, to describe the sloping roofline variation of the Celica with a cargo door hinged at the roof, as opposed to the regular hardtop coupe variation which the company introduced three years earlier. As its roofline slope is uninterrupted, it can also be defined as a fastback-styled hatchback.

From the first to the sixth generations Celica, Toyota marketed two body styles as notchback Coupé and Liftback body styles, with the Convertible based on the notchback became available for the third until sixth generations. The high-performance turbocharged all-wheel-drive GT-Four was only built as Liftback. Only the Liftback was offered for the last or seventh generation.

Toyota also marketed the Corolla Liftback from the third to eight generations. Toyota created two different liftback body shapes for the fourth generation Corolla; the first model with a sloped tailgate was named Coupé, while the second model with a longer roof and slightly more vertical tailgate was named Liftback. The notchback coupé model without a B-pillar was marketed as Hardtop'.

== Liftback versus fastback ==
The term liftback describes a hatchback variant, while the term fastback broadly describes a body style that has an uninterrupted slope in the roofline from the roof rearward. Thus, while most liftbacks are fastbacks, not all fastbacks are liftbacks. Additionally, some fastbacks have a tailgate hinged below a fixed rear window, which is not characteristic of a liftback.

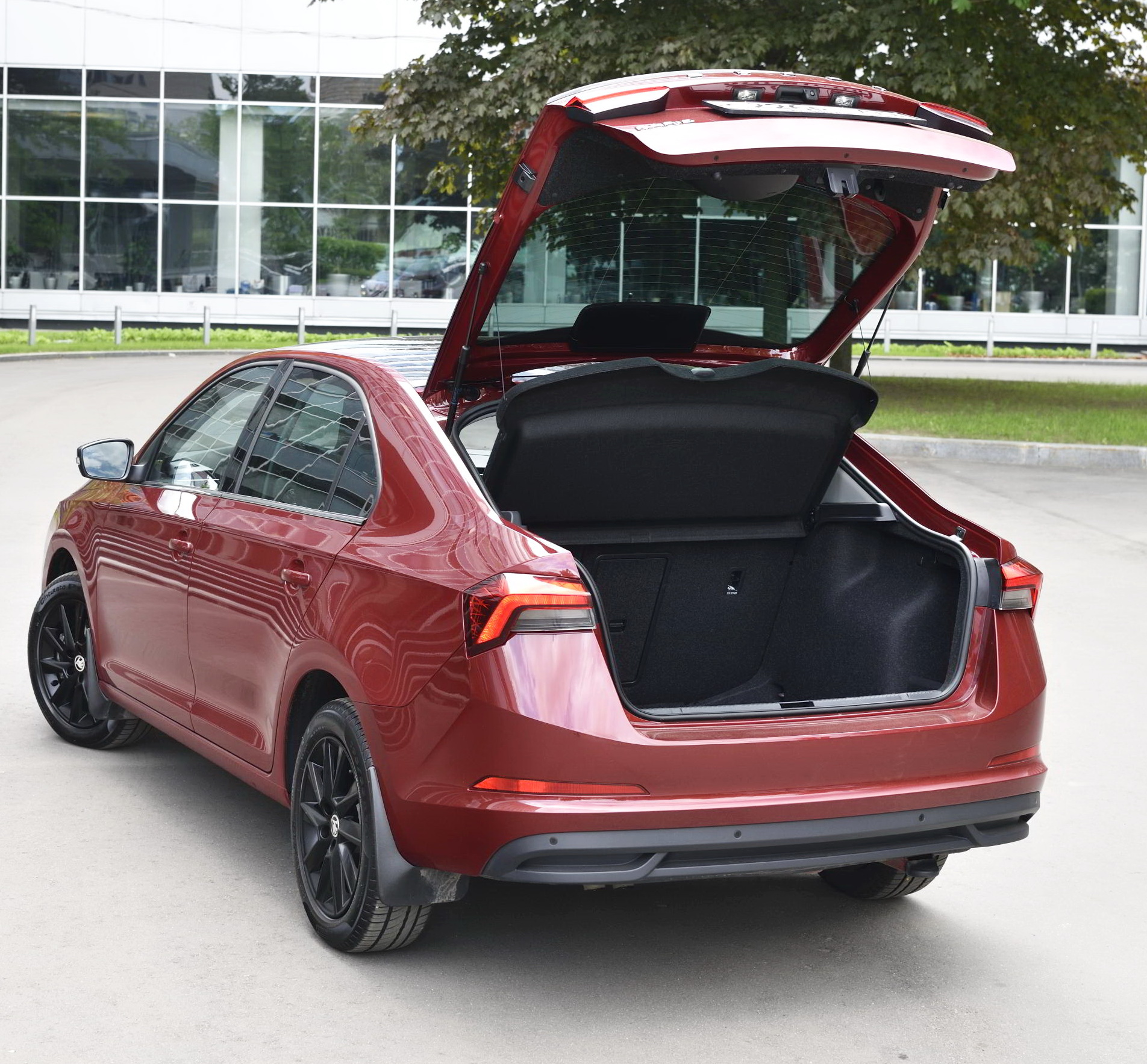
Škoda Rapid liftback. Note how the tailgate is hinged from the roof and the rear window is lifted along with the rest of the tailgate. It is not a fastback as it does not have an uninterrupted slope in the roofline.

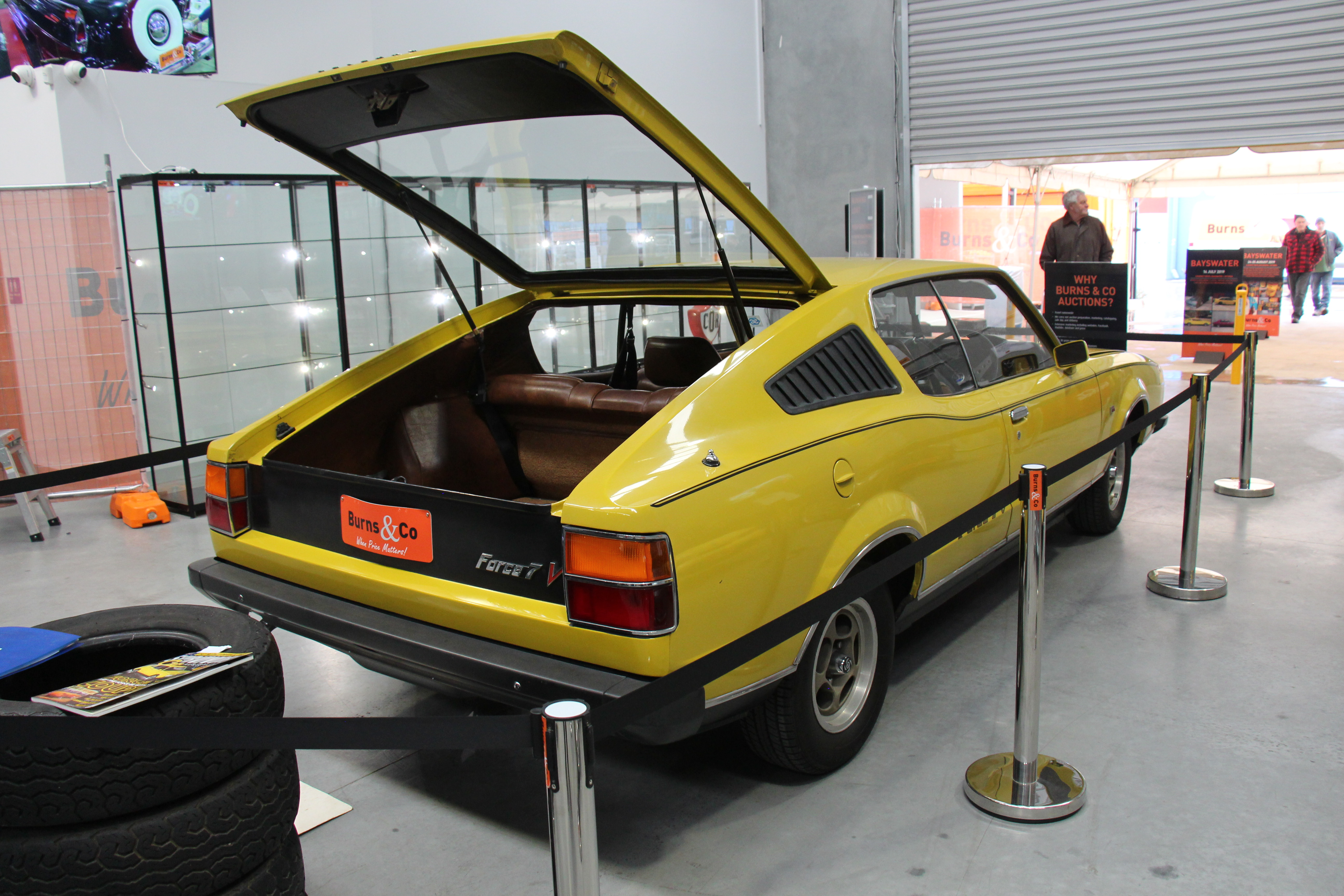
A 1974 Leyland P76. It can be considered both a liftback (the tailgate is hinged from the roof) and a fastback (the roofline is an uninterrupted slope).

== Europe ==
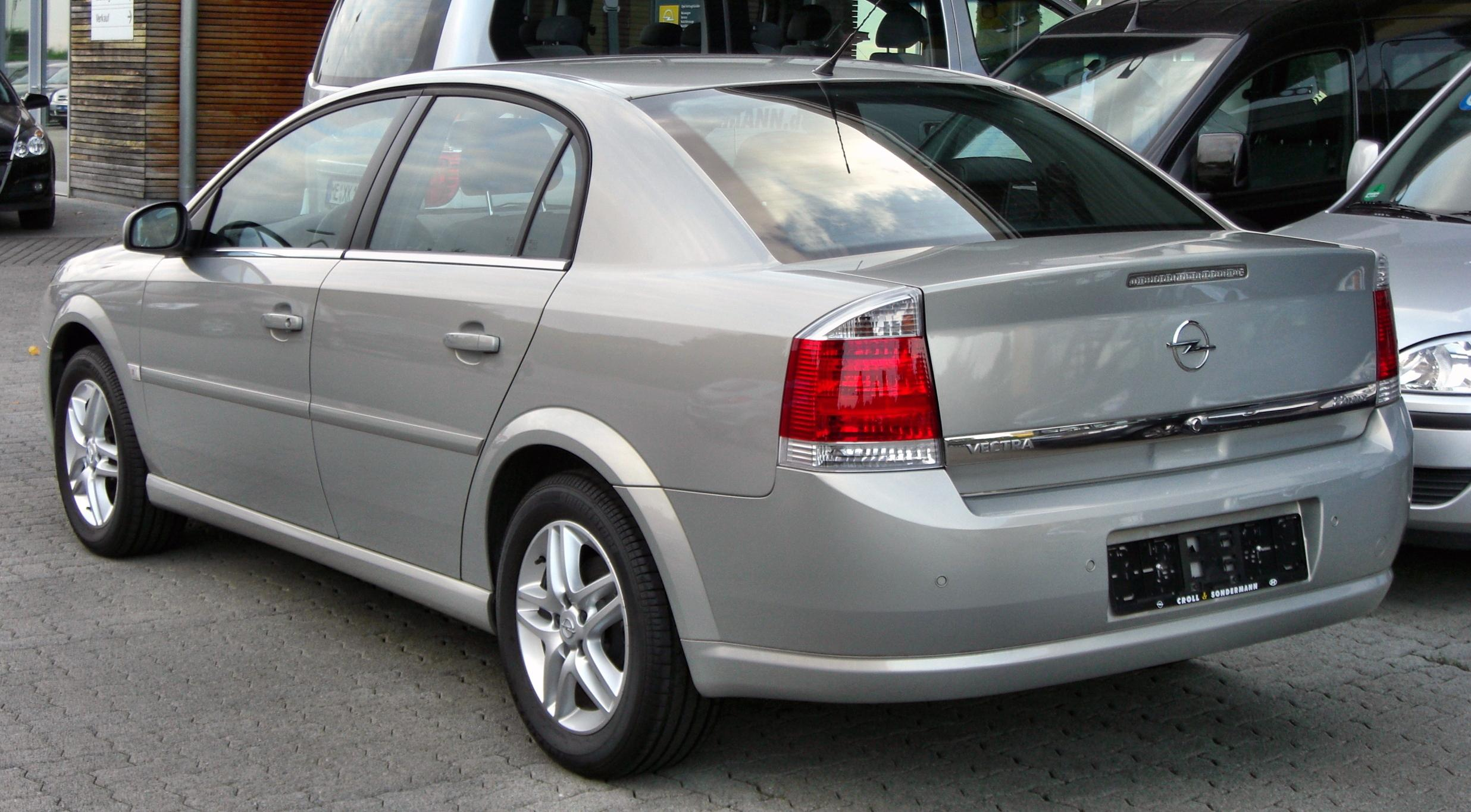
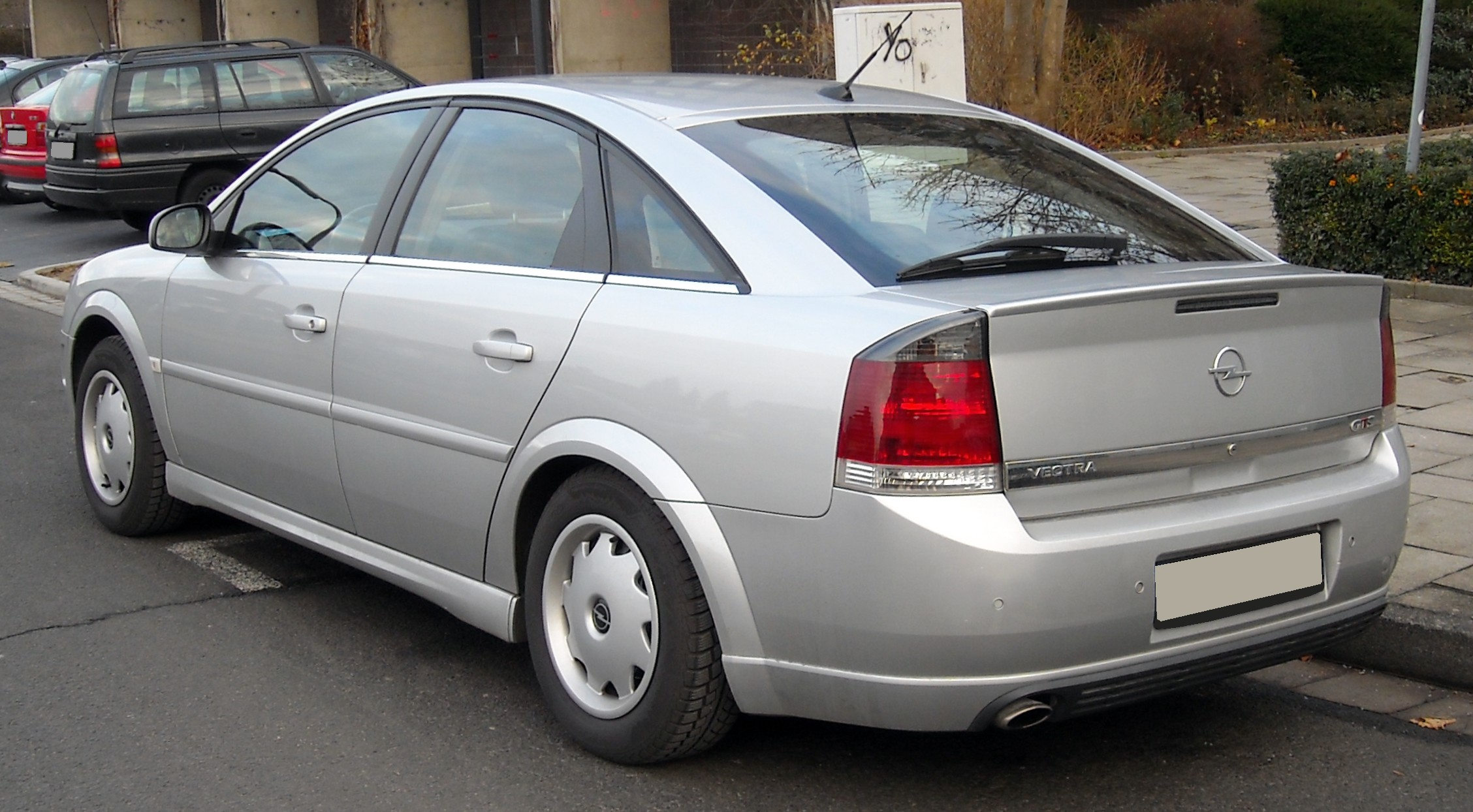
Opel Vectra C as a 4-door sedan (top) and a 5-door liftback (bottom). The length of the rear overhang is the same, and so are other dimensions of the car.
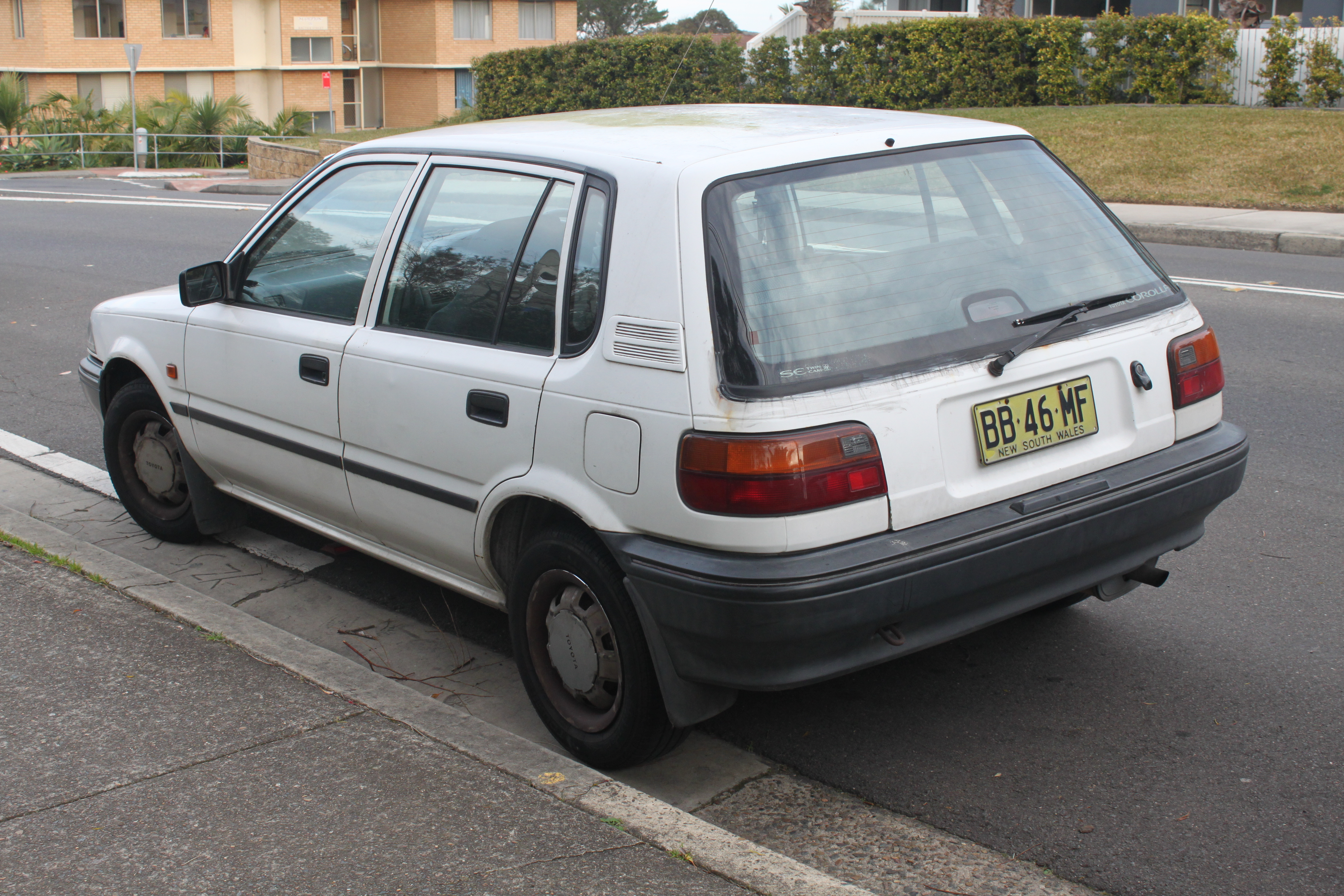
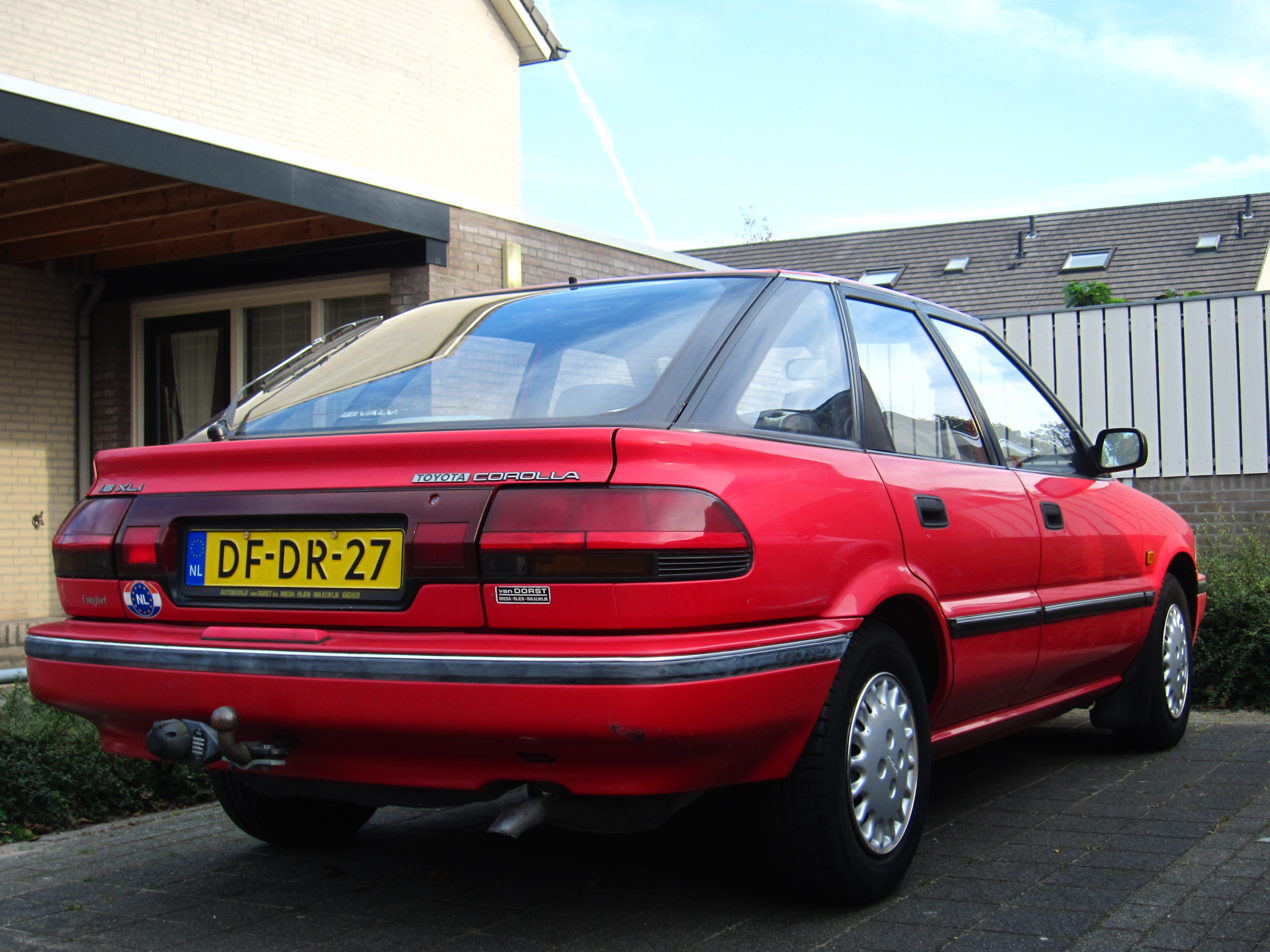
The sixth generation Toyota Corolla 5-door models were built as hatchback (above) and liftback (below).

Liftbacks were the mainstay of manufacturers' D-segment offerings in Europe in the 1990s to late 2000s, having become popular in the 1980s. It was common for manufacturers to offer the same D-segment model in three different body styles: a 4-door sedan, a 5-door liftback, and a 5-door station wagon. Such models included the Ford Mondeo, the Mazda 626 and 6, the Nissan Primera, the Opel Vectra and Insignia, and the Toyota Carina and Avensis. There were also models in this market segment available only as a 5-door liftback or a 4-door sedan, and models available only as a 5-door liftback or a 5-door station wagon. Often, the liftback and the sedan shared the same wheelbase and the same overall length, and the full rear overhang length of a conventional sedan trunk was retained on the five-door liftback version of the car.

The term was sometimes used for marketing purposes, among others, by Toyota, for example, to distinguish between two 5-door versions of the E90 series Corolla sold in Europe, one of which was a conventional 5-door hatchback with a nearly vertical rear hatch while the other one was a 5-door liftback.

Audi, BMW and Mercedes-Benz were not part of this trend in the 1990s, as they did not offer their D-segment or executive cars as 5-door liftbacks back then. However as some other manufacturers started to retire D-segment liftbacks from their European lineup, starting around 2009 Audi and BMW started to sell liftback versions of some of their vehicles but with their own marketing terms, referring to them as Sportback (Audi) or Gran Turismo (BMW). For instance the Audi A4 and Audi A6 sedans had liftback variants known as the Audi A5 Sportback and Audi A7 Sportback, respectively. The Audi A7 Sportback would give rise to the Audi A7L which was an extended-wheelbase sedan of the former. However BMW's liftback variants of the BMW 5 Series (F10) and BMW 5 Series (G30), sold as the BMW 5 Series Gran Turismo (F07) and as the BMW 6 Series (G32), were not successful.

The second-generation Škoda Superb, produced from 2008 until 2015, is a car that functions both as a hatchback and a sedan. It features a Twindoor trunk lid that can be opened using hinges located below the rear glass, or together with the rear glass using hinges at the roof.

== See also ==
- Car classification
- Fastback
