= List of Dacia vehicles =

The Romanian automobile manufacturer Dacia has produced a number of vehicles since its inception in 1966. Since becoming a part of Groupe Renault in 1999, many of its vehicles have also been rebadged under the Renault marque.

== Current production vehicles ==
| Model | Calendar year introduced | Current model | | Vehicle description |
| Model | Calendar year introduced | Introduction | Update/facelift | Vehicle description |
|---|---|---|---|---|
Hatchback
| Sandero | 2008 | 2020 | 2025 | Entry-level B-segment hatchback. Crossover-styled version sold as the Dacia Sandero Stepway. |
| Spring | 2020 | 2026 | — | Battery electric city car (A-segment). |
Saloon
| Logan | 2004 | 2020 | 2025 | Entry-level B-segment saloon. |
Station wagon
| Striker | 2026 | 2026 | — | Compact C-segment Wagon. |
SUV/crossover
| Duster | 2010 | 2023 | — | Compact crossover SUV with optional all-wheel drive. |
| Bigster | 2025 | 2025 | — | Compact crossover SUV based on the Duster. |
MPV/minivan
| Jogger | 2021 | 2021 | 2025 | Crossover-styled compact MPV based on the Sandero and Logan, successor of the Lodgy and Logan MCV. |

== Former production vehicles ==
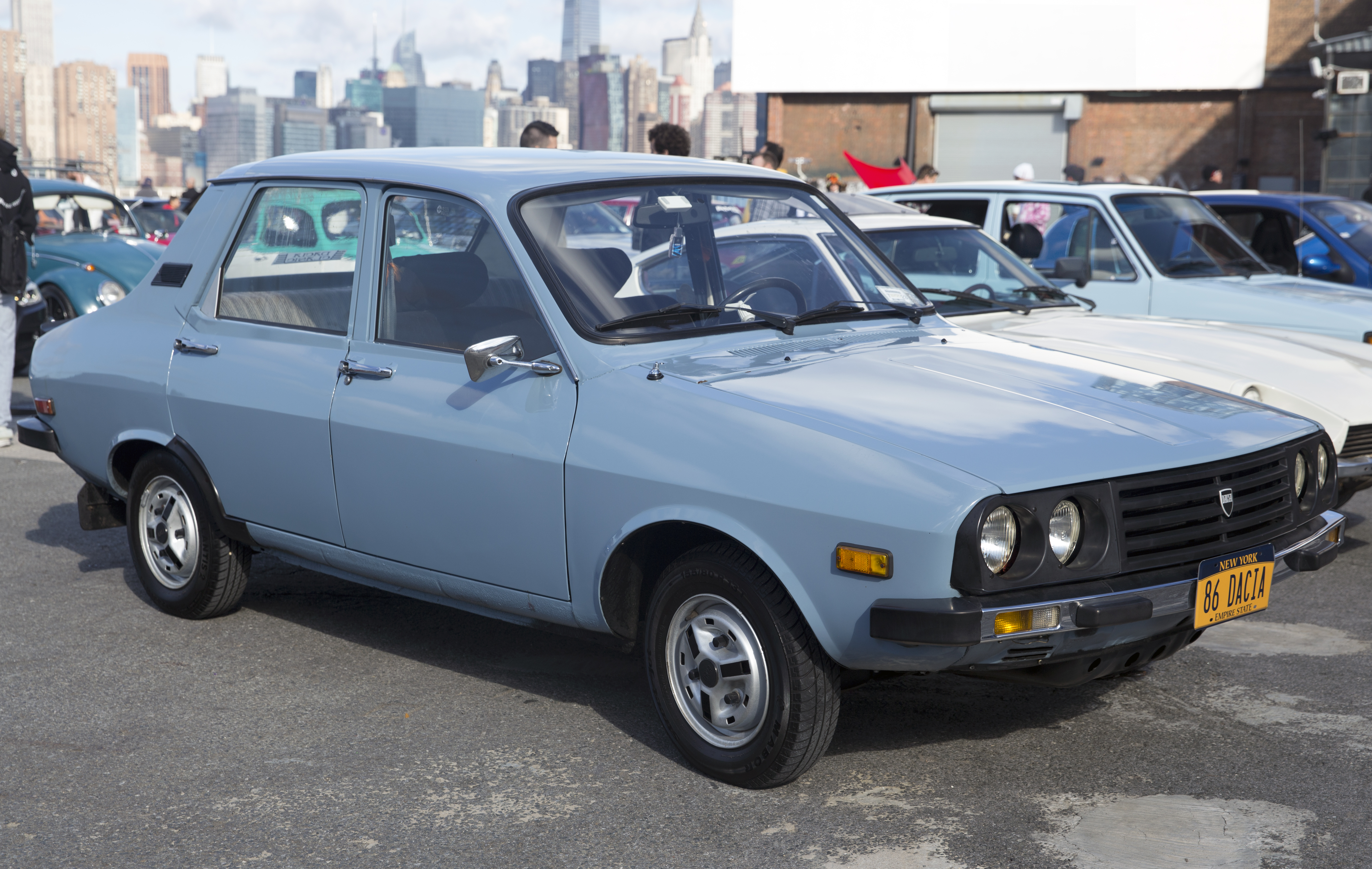
1986 Dacia 1310

- 1968-72 1100
- 1969-79 1300
- 1970-74 1301
- 1974-76 D6
- 1975-82 1302
- 1979-2004 1310
- 1979-2006 1304
- 1980-82 2000
- 1983-95 Duster
- 1985-89 1320
- 1985-2006 1305(Drop Side)
- 1988-91 500(Lăstun)
- 1990-96 1325(Liberta)
- 1992-2006 1307(Double Cab)
- 1992-97 1309
- 1995-2000 Nova
- 2000-03 SupeRNova
- 2003-05 Solenza
- 2007-12 Logan Van
- 2008-12 Logan Pick-up
- 2006-21 Logan MCV
- 2012-21 Dokker
- 2012-22 Lodgy

== Concept vehicles ==
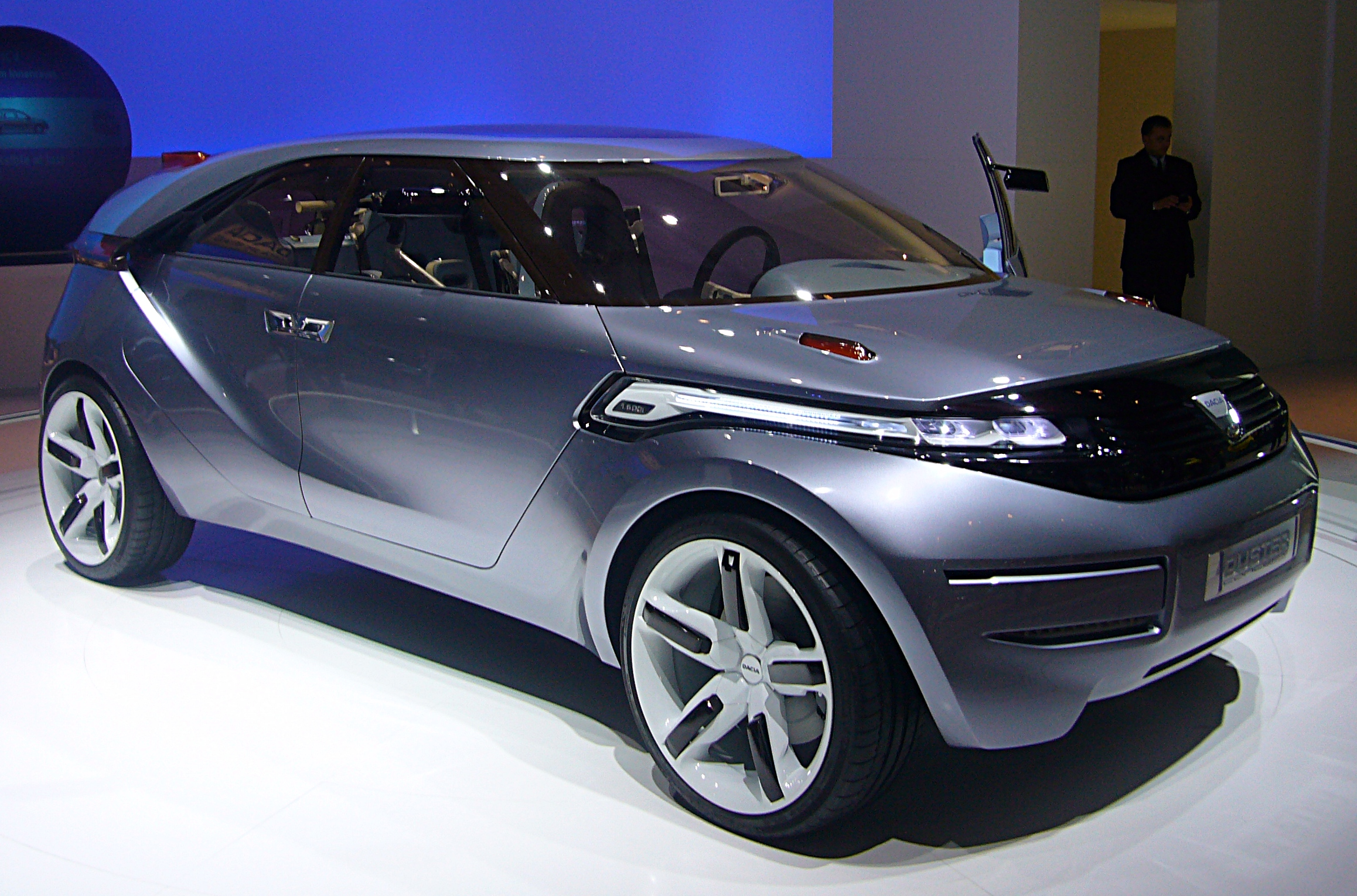
2009 Dacia Duster Concept

- 1980 Braşovia
- 2006 Logan Steppe
- 2007 Logan S2000
- 2009 Duster
- 2020 Dacia Spring
- 2021 Dacia Bigster
- 2022 Dacia Manifesto
- 2025 Dacia Hipster

== See also ==
- Automobile Dacia
- Renault
- Automotive industry in Romania
