= List of microcars by country of origin: R =

== List ==
Country	Automobile Name	Manufacturer	Engine Make/Capacity	Seats	Year	Other information
Romania	Dacia 500 Lăstun	Dacia, Timișoara	499 cc	4	1980-1990	
