= Dacia Bigster (concept car) =

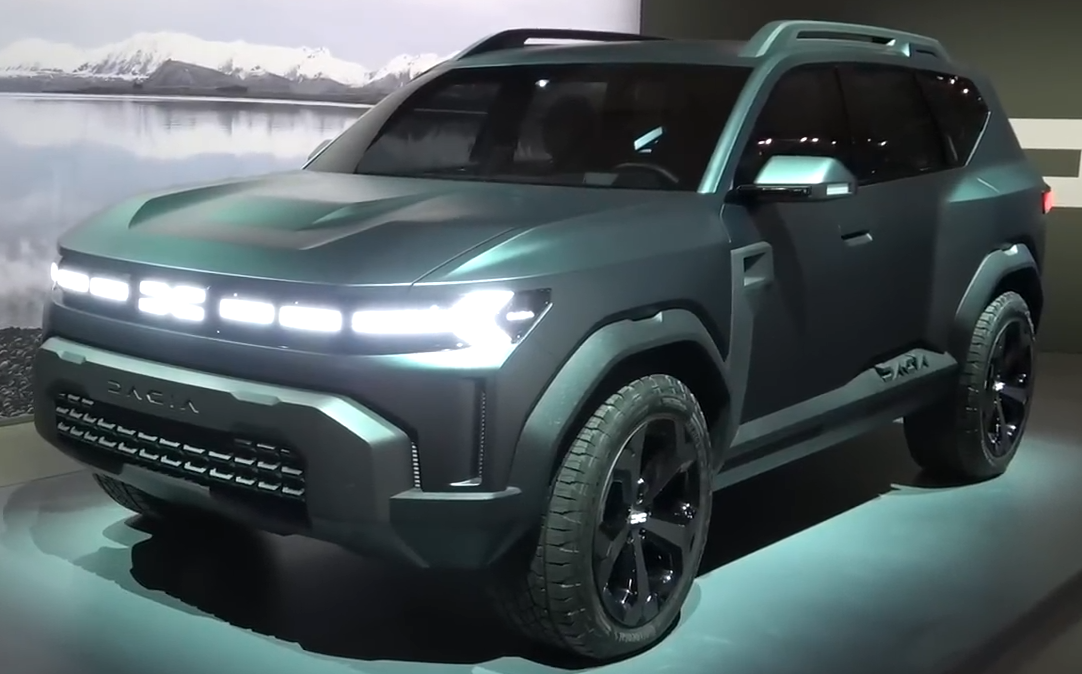
- 2021 Dacia Bigster Concept

Overview
- Manufacturer: Dacia
- Production: 2021

Body and chassis
- Class: Concept Car
- Body style: 5-door SUV
- Layout: Front motor, front-wheel drive four-wheel-drive
- Platform: Renault CMF-B platform
- Related: Lada Niva Vision

Powertrain
- Electric motor: Permanent magnet synchronous

Dimensions
- Length: 4,600 mm (181.1 in)

The Dacia Bigster Concept is a concept SUV from Romanian car manufacturer Dacia. It was unveiled in January 2021 and was released in 2025.

== Overview ==
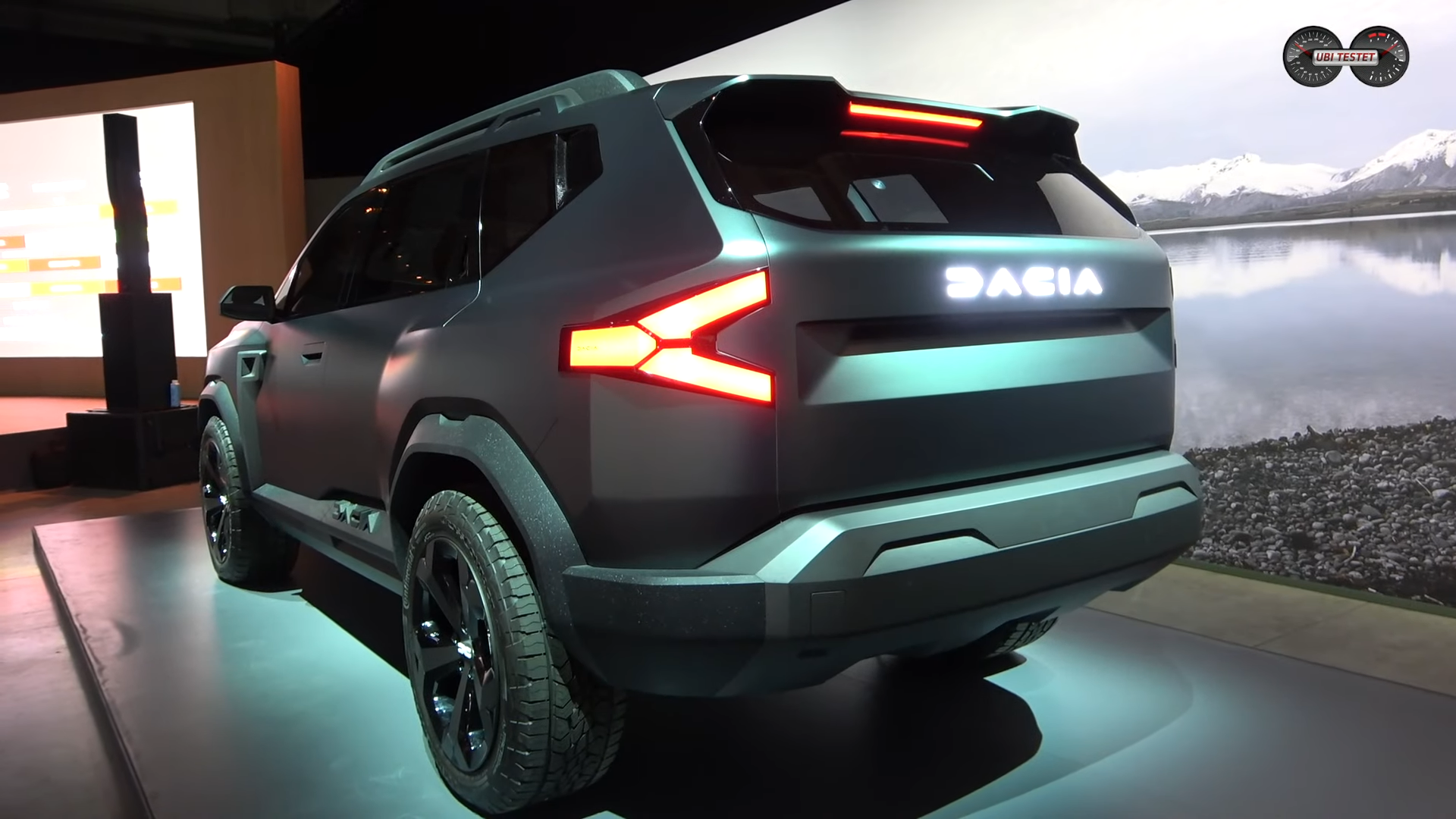
Rear

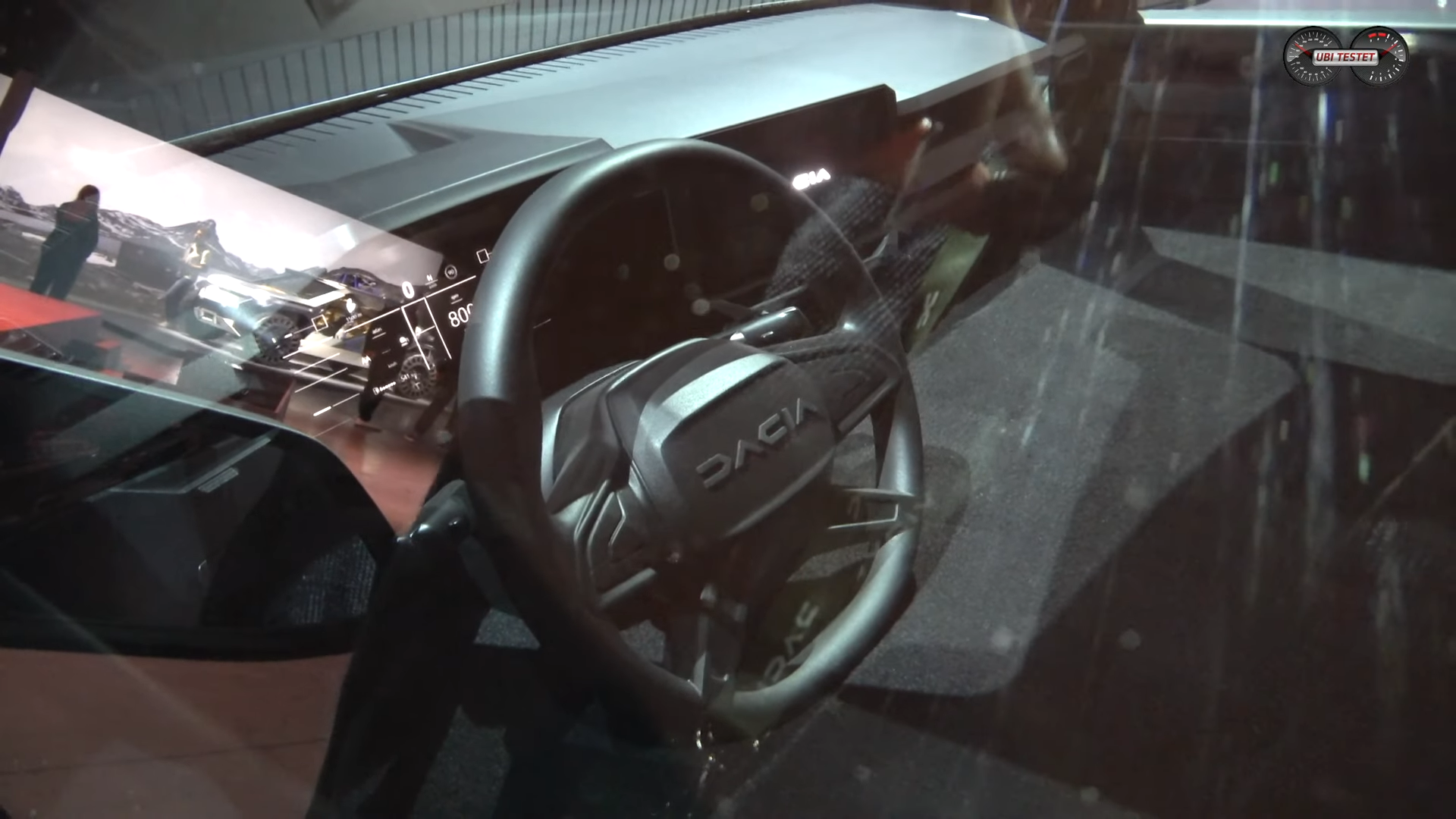
Interior

The Bigster concept car was presented on 14 January 2021 during the presentation of the "Renaulution" strategic plan by the new managing director of Renault, Luca de Meo. The Bigster receives the brand new Dacia logo on its grille formed by the letters "DC".

The Bigster Concept is based on the Renault's elongated CMF-B modular platform, notably from the Renault Clio V.

== Production model ==
Dacia has confirmed it will offer a production C-segment SUV based on the Bigster concept.

The Bigster is built at the Mioveni factory in Romania starting in 2025, one year after the plant started production of the third-generation Dacia Duster.
