= Dacia 1100 =

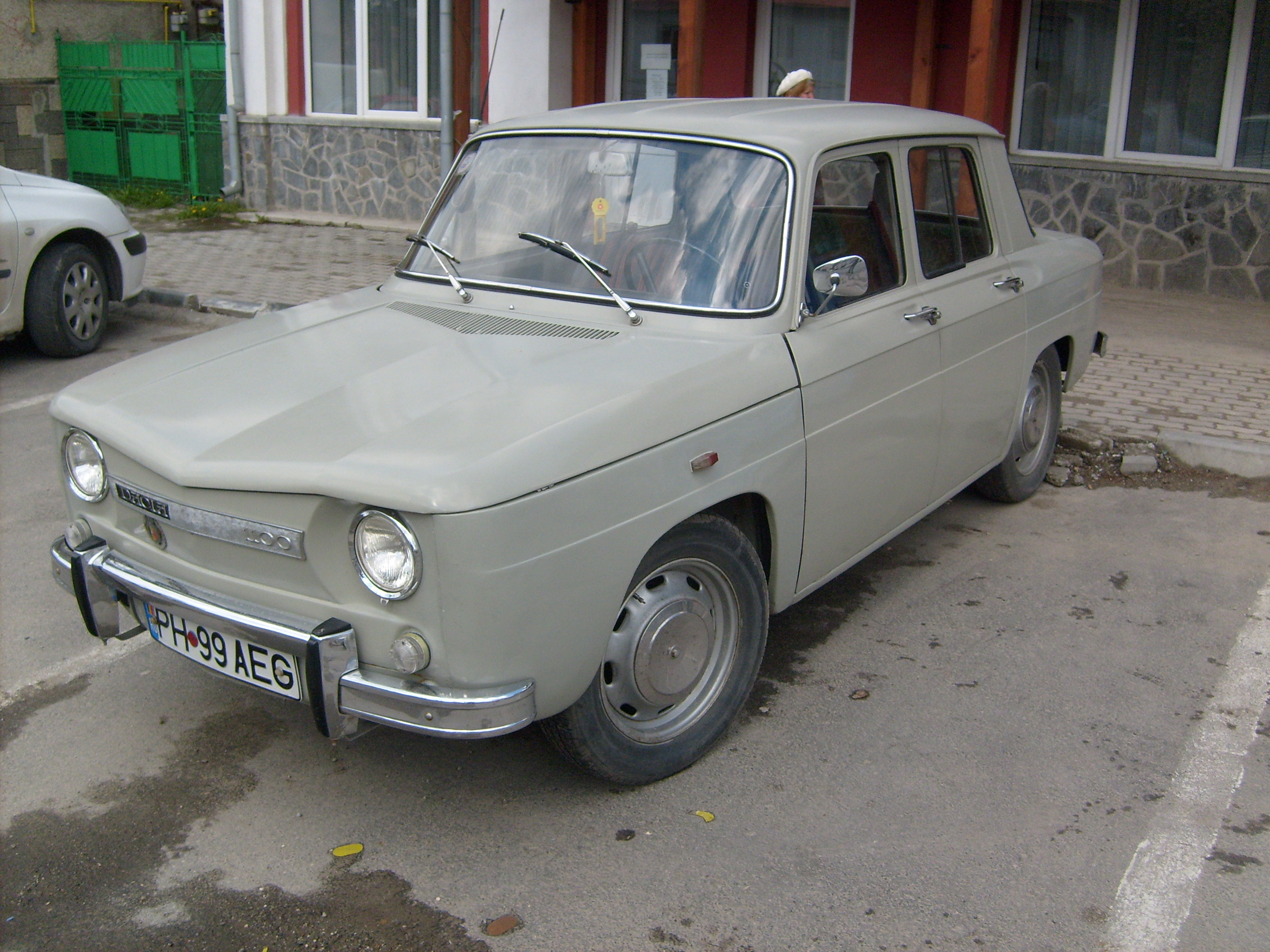

Overview
- Manufacturer: Dacia
- Production: August 1968–1971
- Assembly: Romania: Pitești

Body and chassis
- Body style: 4-door saloon
- Platform: Renault 8
- Related: Renault 8

Powertrain
- Engine: 1108 cc I4
- Transmission: 4-speed manual

Dimensions
- Wheelbase: 2270 mm
- Length: 3990 mm
- Width: 1490 mm
- Height: 1410 mm
- Curb weight: 760 kg

Chronology
- Successor: Dacia 1300

The Dacia 1100 was the first model of passenger car produced by the Romanian manufacturer Dacia, being a knock-down kit assembly of the French Renault 8 model. Between 1968 and 1971, 37.546 cars were produced in Romania.

== Licensing agreement ==
In 1965, Nicolae Ceaușescu was elected first secretary of the Romanian Communist Party, and he decided that the foreign currency effort spent on importing cars needed to be reduced. To start production as quickly as possible, and in the absence of a modern domestic industry to develop a new car, the Central Committee of the Party launched a tender for the manufacture of a mid-range car with a 1000-1300 cc engine and an annual production of 40,000-50,000 units.

The following companies and models entered the tender:

- Alfa Romeo GT 1300 (launched in 1965)
- Fiat 1100D (launched in 1957)
- Morris Mini (launched in 1959)
- Peugeot 204 (launched in April 1965)
- Renault 12 (in development at that time)

On September 6, 1966, the framework contract between the Romanian state and Régie Nationale des Usines Renault was signed in Bucharest. The French company offered a simultaneous launch of its new, state-of-the-art model with the Romanian version. In 1969, the Renault 12 was launched in Paris, and the Dacia 1300 in Bucharest.

The agreement, valid for 10 years, provided for the temporary construction of another model from the French manufacturer's range until the launch of the Renault 12. Initially, the Renault 16 model seemed to be preferred by the Romanian side, but the final decision was made in favor of the Renault 8 Major, whose price was more accessible to Romanian customers.

The new brand was named Dacia, after the Roman name of the area now occupied by modern Romania, and the model was named 1100, after the engine displacement of 1108 cc.

On September 16, 1966, it was decided to locate the factory opposite the Colibași Auto Parts Plant, utilizing hangars built in 1943 for aviation. The construction of the factory began in the first days of 1967 with Renault's assistance. A year and a half later, on July 1, 1968, idle tests began at the 217 workstations. On August 3, 1968, the first pre-series cars rolled out of the new Pitești Automobile Plant.

== Gallery ==
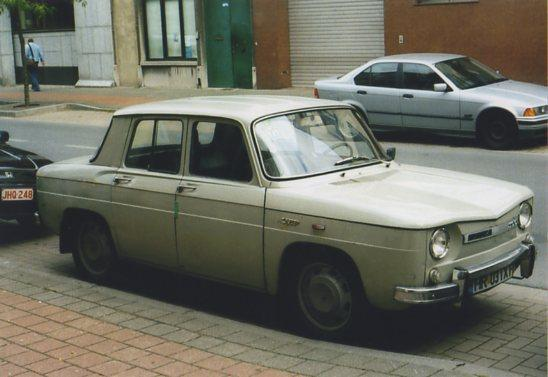
Dacia 1100

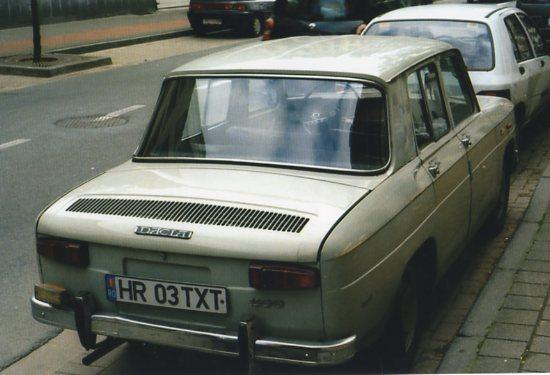
Dacia 1100 (rear view)

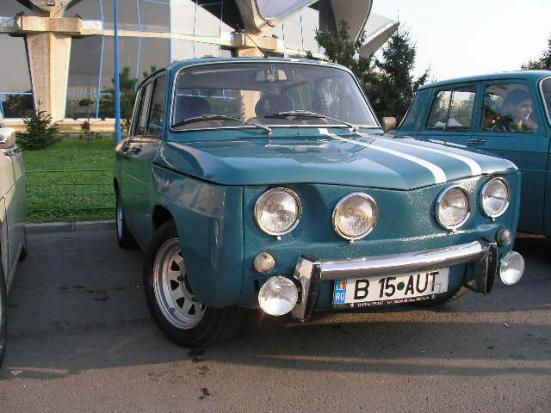
Dacia 1100 Sport

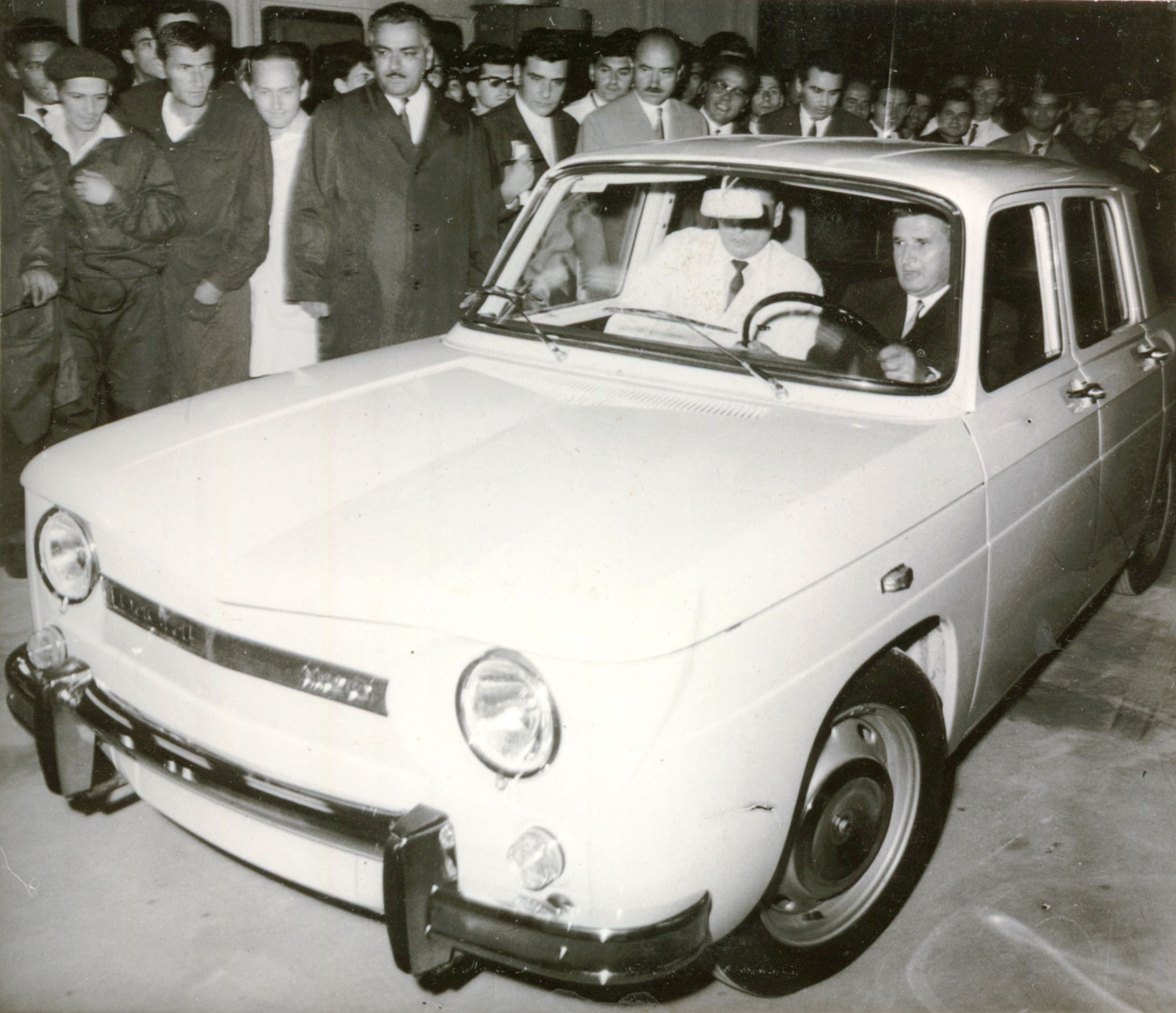
Nicolae Ceaușescu driving the first Dacia to roll out

== Dacia 1100 ==
The Dacia 1100 was based on the Renault 8, a rear-engine, rear-wheel-drive sedan.

The model was available in the following colors:

- turquoise green (green 57)
- garnet red (red 28)
- cream (white 40)
- light gray (gray 83)
- blue (blue 68)

The Renault Cléon-Fonte ("Sierra") engine developed 46 hp (35 kW) at 4600 rpm and propelled the car to a top speed of 132 km/h. It was mounted longitudinally in the rear and was water-cooled.

The initial price was around 55,000 Lei, at a time when the average net salary in 1968 was 1,139 Lei.

In 1969, the 100th Dacia 1100 was offered as a gift to President Nicolae Ceaușescu (number plate 1-B-2645), and some cars were distributed to the police, equipped with blue lights and sirens.

The Dacia 1100, like the Renault 8, was a vehicle with independent suspension on all four wheels, disc brakes on both axles, and a gearbox operated with a floor-mounted lever.

A sports version called the 1100S was also produced, with two headlights on each side, used in competitions by the Romanian National Rally Team. The same model was used in local races, called "Cup Dacia 1100".

Between 1968 and 1972, 37,546 Dacia 1100 cars were produced.
