= Dacia Manifesto =

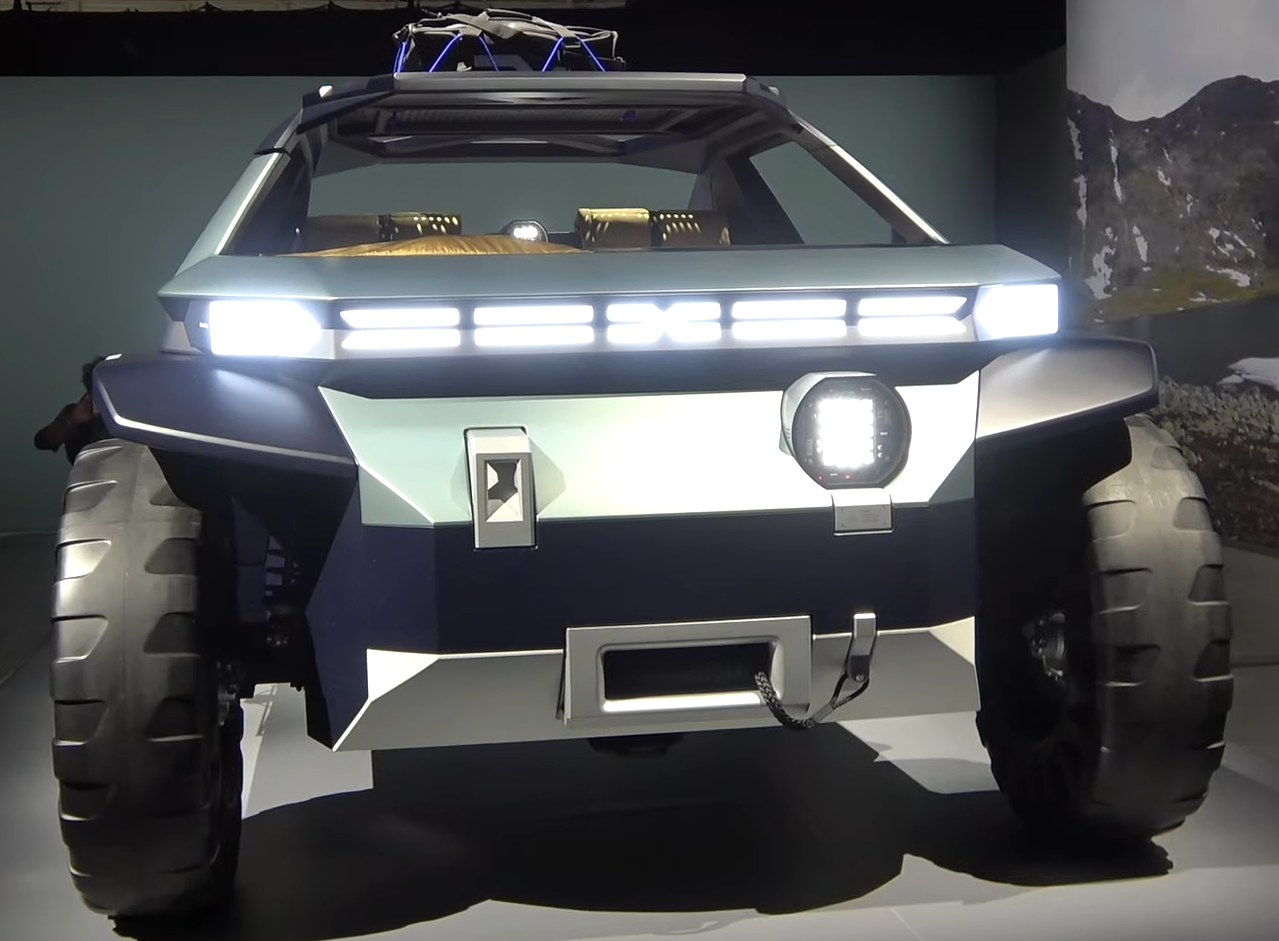

Overview
- Manufacturer: Dacia
- Production: 2022
- Designer: David Durand (design chief)

Body and chassis
- Class: Concept car
- Body style: 2-door buggy

Dimensions
- Length: 3,600 mm (141.7 in)
- Curb weight: 720 kg (1,587 lb)

The Dacia Manifesto is an all-wheel drive electric buggy concept with high ground clearance, officially presented by Dacia on September 16, 2022.

Before that, the concept was briefly shown on September 14, 2022 in a teaser published by Dacia Romania on their Facebook page. It was also present at the 2022 Paris Motor Show alongside the rest of the refreshed range.

== Overview ==
The model bears the brand's new emblem, which is here illuminated. The body is made from a recycled plastic called Starkle and has no doors, side windows or windshield. The vehicle, including the interior, are 100% waterproof. The concept will not become a production model and, as the representatives of the company say, it is a "laboratory for the implementation of the newest ideas".
