= Dacia Hipster =

City car concept by Dacia

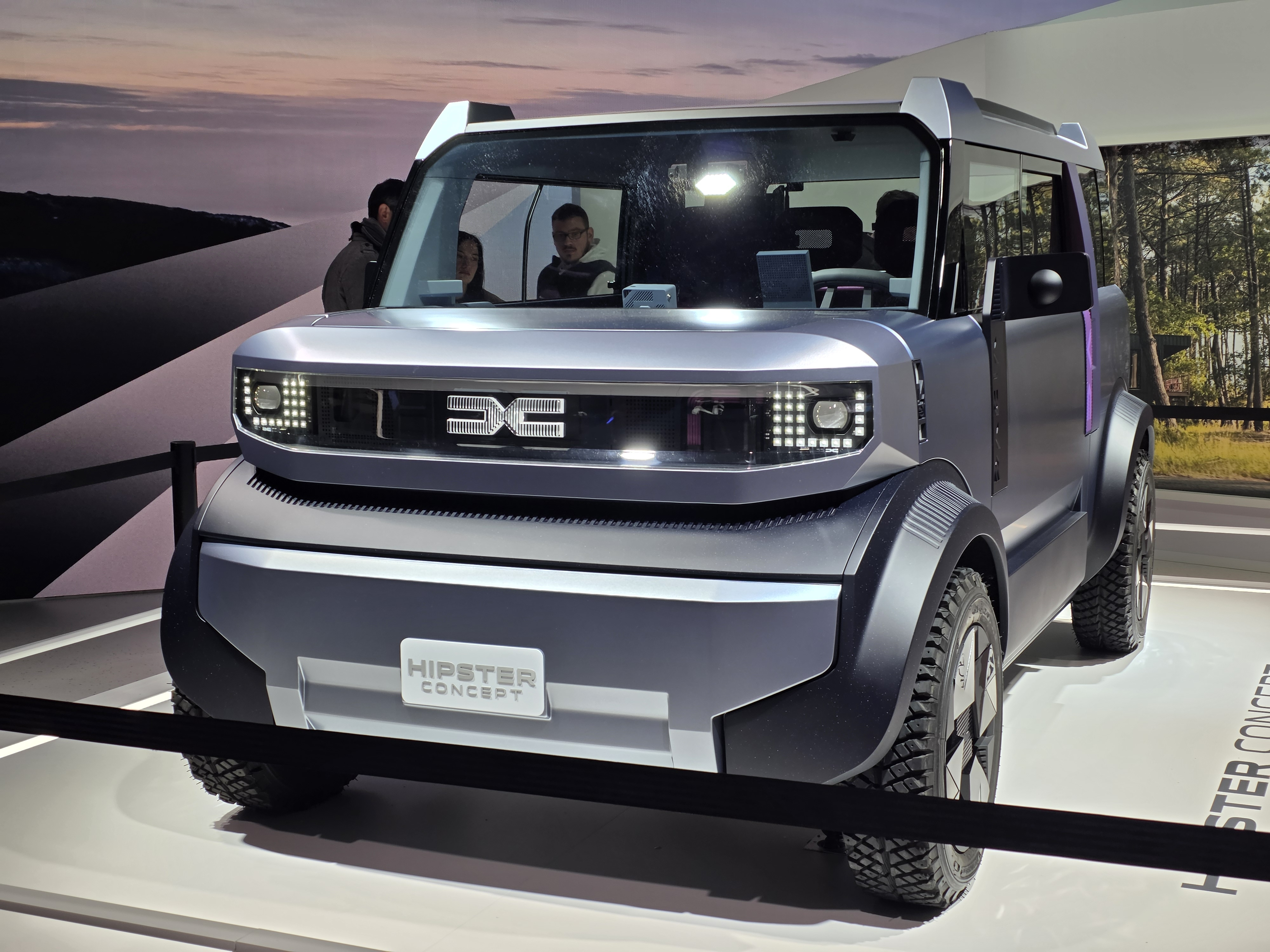
A Dacia Hipster exposed at the 2026 Brussels Motor Show.

The Dacia Hipster is a four-seat EU microcar concept by Dacia. Dacia claims the Hipster will “enable as many people as possible to access essential mobility” in the face of rising costs brought about by regulation and electrification. The car will potentially provide an alternative to low-cost Chinese electric vehicles.

It measures just 1.55m wide, 1.53m high and 3m long, as do most other European microcars such as those by traditional French microcar makers Aixam and Ligier in order to comply with European L6e and L7e microcar regulations.

The Hipster has up to 500 litres of load space with the rear seats folded. This city car is all about 90-degree angles. The boxy three-door Hipster's maximum speed would be around 90 km per hour (55.92 mph) and it would have a range of 150 km (93 mi).
