= Dacia Striker =

Small family car

Overview
- Manufacturer: Dacia (Renault)
- Model code: C-Neo
- Production: 2026–present
- Assembly: Turkey: Bursa (Oyak-Renault)

Body and chassis
- Class: Small family car (C)
- Body style: 5-door crossover station wagon
- Layout: Front-engine, front-wheel drive; Front-engine, all-wheel drive (Hybrid 4x4)
- Platform: Renault–Nissan CMF-B LS
- Related: Dacia Duster III; Dacia Logan III; Dacia Sandero III; Dacia Jogger; Dacia Bigster

Dimensions
- Length: 4,620 mm (181.9 in)
- Width: 1,820 mm (71.7 in)
- Height: 1,530 mm (60.2 in)
- Curb weight: 1,400 kg (3,086 lb)

Chronology
- Predecessor: Dacia Logan MCV II

The Dacia Striker is a small family car (C-segment) produced by the Romanian manufacturer Dacia.

== Overview ==
Rear view

It is a new long-roof model positioned above of the Jogger. At 4.62 meters (181.8 inches) long, it is longer than the Bigster and will be available with multiple powertrains. There will be a hybrid version with front-wheel drive and an electrified version with all-wheel-drive. In some markets there will be a combustion engine that runs on liquefied petroleum gas. On 8 July 2026, Dacia formally announced the Striker and that it would be priced under €25,000 in Europe.

The entry-level Hybrid 155 uses a 1.8-litre four with an EV motor in the gearbox and a 48V starter-generator to send 153bhp to the front wheels. The 150 Hybrid trim has a 1.2-litre engine driving the fronts and an EV motor at the rear for a combined 148bhp and part-time four-wheel drive. It has multiple drive modes, including Snow, Mud, Sand and Off Road, and a hill descent control function.
