= Dacia Lăstun =

Dacia 500 Lăstun
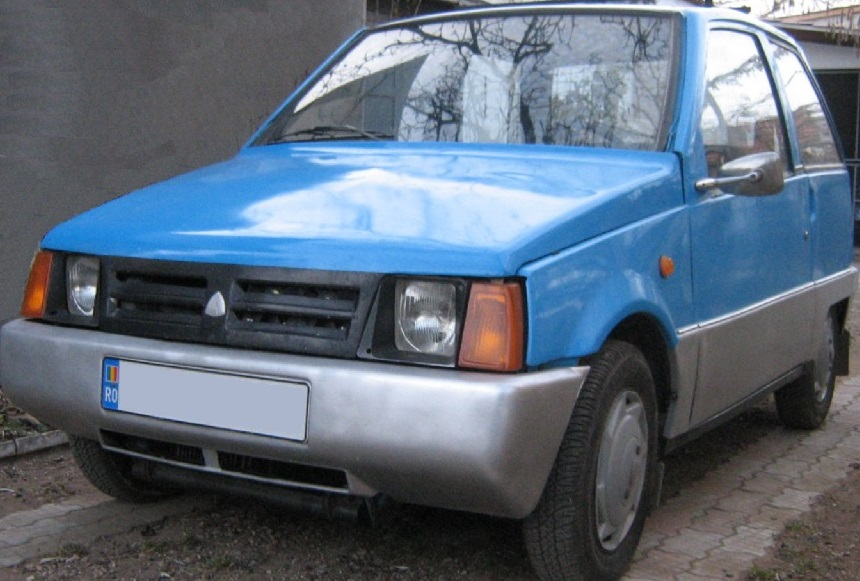

Overview
- Manufacturer: Tehnometal Plant (Dacia)
- Production: 1988–1991
- Assembly: Romania: Timișoara

Body and chassis
- Class: City car (A)
- Body style: 3-door hatchback
- Layout: FF layout

Powertrain
- Engine: 0.5 L I2
- Transmission: 4-speed manual

Dimensions
- Wheelbase: 1,915 mm (75.4 in)
- Length: 2,950 mm (116 in)
- Width: 1,410 mm (56 in)
- Height: 1,352 mm (53.2 in)
- Curb weight: 590 kg (1,301 lb)

The Dacia 500 Lăstun (Romanian pronunciation: [ləsˈtun]) is a small city car manufactured by Tehnometal, Timișoara, under the auto marque Dacia. The name derives from the Romanian word for house martin, a small bird related to swallows.

== History ==
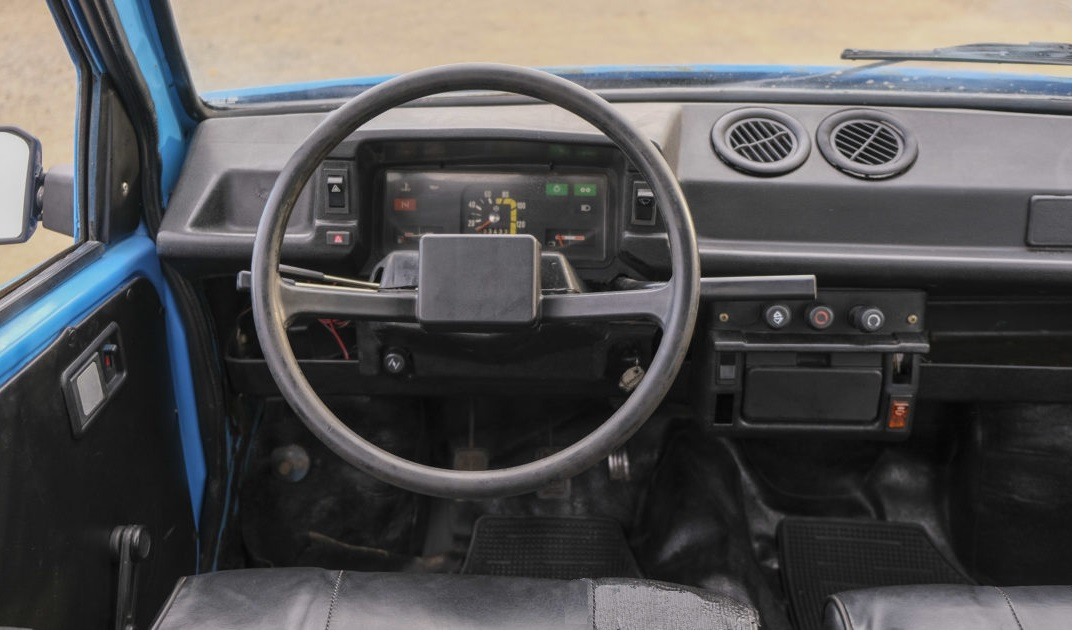
Interior.

The Lăstun is a low-cost Romanian car made for urban transport, and it was built between 1988 and 1991, featuring a two-cylinder air-cooled engine of 499 cc, producing 22.5 PS (16.5 kW), fuel consumption of 3.3 L/100 km (86 mpg_{‑imp}; 71 mpg_{‑US}), a maximum speed 106 km/h (66 mph) and fiberglass bodywork, with a design sharing some similarity to the Lancia Y10. A stretched bodywork prototype 500 Lăstun was exhibited at the 1989 Bucharest trade fair. Another prototype from the early 1990s featured hubcaps, body-coloured bumpers, and head restraints.

The Lăstun was marketed with the advertising slogan: "Un Autoturism de Actualitate" (A Contemporary Vehicle).

Production continued until 1991. Due to its size, the Lăstun was primarily a city car, and was suitable for use as a second car. In 1989, the Lăstun received side lights, and in 1991, the Lăstun was lightly restyled to the front, with the only modification being a new bonnet with a one-piece grille. Also, the small 0.5L engine had some carburateur break-downs, which brought the average petrol consumption to almost 9 L/100 km (31 mpg_{‑imp}; 26 mpg_{‑US}), making the car less economical than the long running Dacia 1300 series.

Tehnometal manufactured a total of 6,532 vehicles.

== Engines ==
Name	Capacity	Type	Power	Torque	Top speed	Acceleration 0–400 m	Combined consumption
G.V.500	499 cc	4 valves OHC	22.5 PS (17 kW; 22 hp) at 5500 rpm	34.5 N⋅m (25.4 lb⋅ft) at 3500 rpm	106 km/h (66 mph)	26 s	4 L/100 km (71 mpg_{‑imp}; 59 mpg_{‑US})
