= Automobile Dacia =

Romanian car manufacturer

S.C. Automobile Dacia S.A.

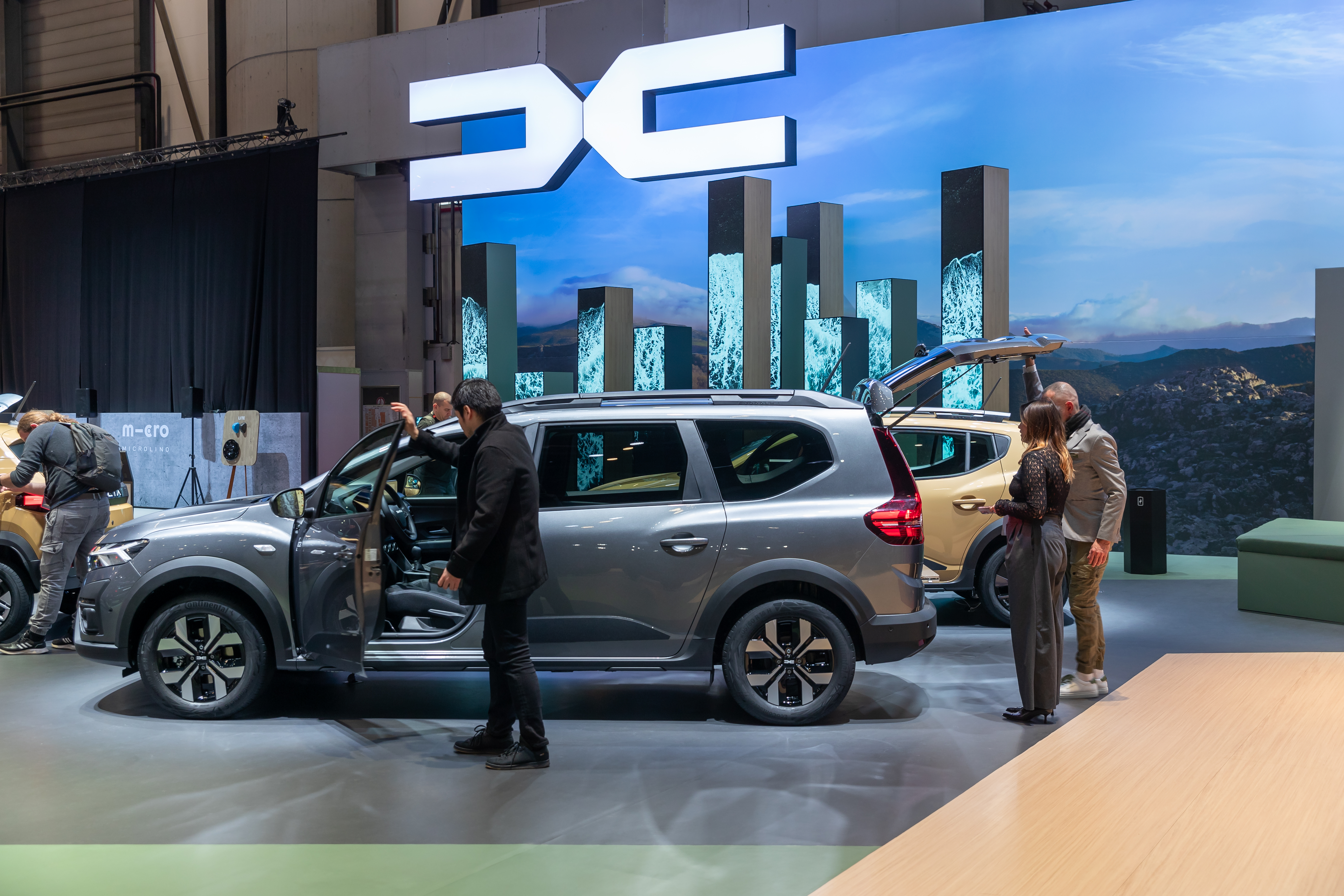
- Dacia stand at the 2024 Geneva International Motor Show
- Type: Subsidiary
- Industry: Automotive
- Founded: September 1966; 60 years ago
- Headquarters: Mioveni, Argeș, Romania
- Area served: Europe (except Armenia, Azerbaijan, Belarus, Ukraine, Georgia, Russia), Algeria, Israel, Lebanon, Morocco, Overseas France and Tunisia
- Key people: Katrin Adt (CEO Dacia company)
- Products: Automobiles, commercial vehicles
- Production output: ▼297,381 (2025) (Note: Only Dacia-badged vehicles manufactured by the Dacia company at the Mioveni plant, excluding other Renault subsidiaries.)
- Revenue: ▲29,920 million lei (€5,689 million) (2025)
- Operating income: ▲927 million lei (2025)
- Net income: ▲629 million lei (2025)
- Total assets: ▲9,428 million lei (2025)
- Total equity: ▼3,830 million lei (2025)
- Number of employees: ▼10,115 (2025)
- Parent: Renault
- Website: www.dacia.ro

S.C. Automobile Dacia S.A., commonly known as Dacia (Romanian pronunciation: [ˈdatʃi.a]), is a Romanian car manufacturer that takes its name from the historical region that constitutes present-day Romania. The company was established in 1966. In 1999, after 33 years, the Romanian government sold Dacia to the French car manufacturer Groupe Renault. It is Romania's largest company by revenue and the largest exporter, constituting 8% of the country's total exports in 2018. In 2024, the Dacia brand sold 676,340 passenger and commercial vehicles.

The company was renamed Dacia which was an ancient kingdom covering much of Southeastern Europe.

From January 2021 onwards the Dacia company became part of Renault's Dacia-Lada business unit. In May 2022, Renault sold Lada's parent company AvtoVAZ to Russian state-owned institute NAMI.

== History ==
The first facility in the area was built between 1942 and 1945, as an extension of the IAR aircraft manufacturer. The new factory, built in the Colibași-Pitești area under the order of Marshal Ion Antonescu (conducător of Romania during World War II), was scheduled to produce up to 600 aircraft engines per month. The building work was completed in 1945. After the war, the facility was taken over by the Romanian Railways, later generating the Dacia plants.

Dacia logo, 2020

=== Founding ===
The Dacia automobile company was founded in 1966 under the name Uzină de Autoturisme Pitești (UAP). The main Dacia factory was inaugurated in 1968, in Colibași (now called Mioveni), near Pitești. Dacia acquired the tooling and basic designs of the Renault 12. However, until the tooling was ready it was decided to produce the Renault 8 under licence; it was known as the Dacia 1100. From 1968 to 1972, 37,546 cars of model 1100 were produced, with a very minor cosmetic change to the front in early 1970. Also produced in very limited numbers was the 1100S, with twin headlamps and a more powerful engine, used by the police and in motor racing.

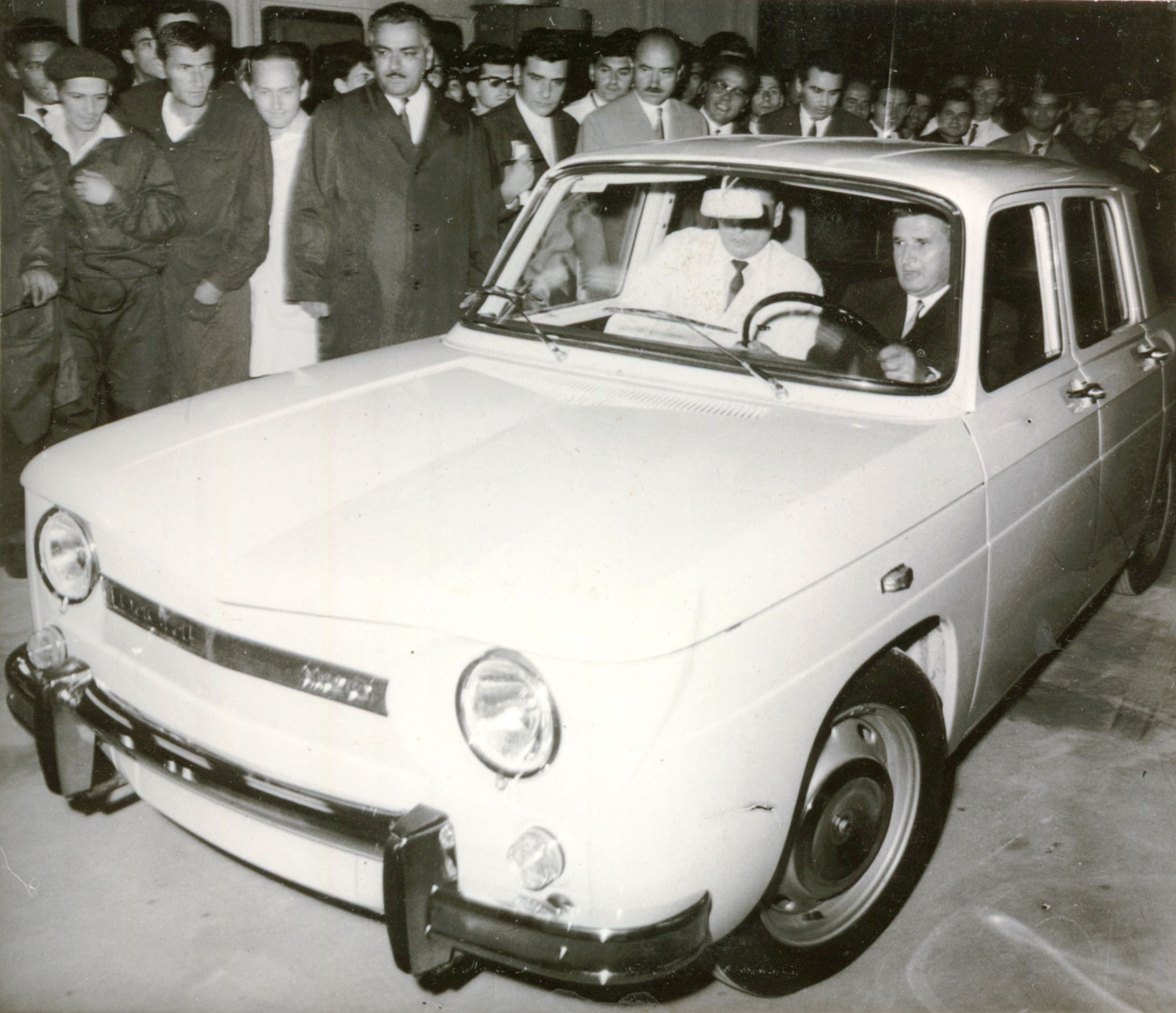
Nicolae Ceaușescu driving the first Dacia 1100 in 1968

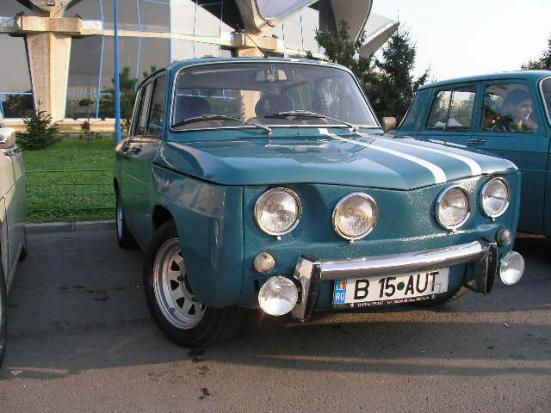
Dacia 1100S (licensed R8 Gordini version)

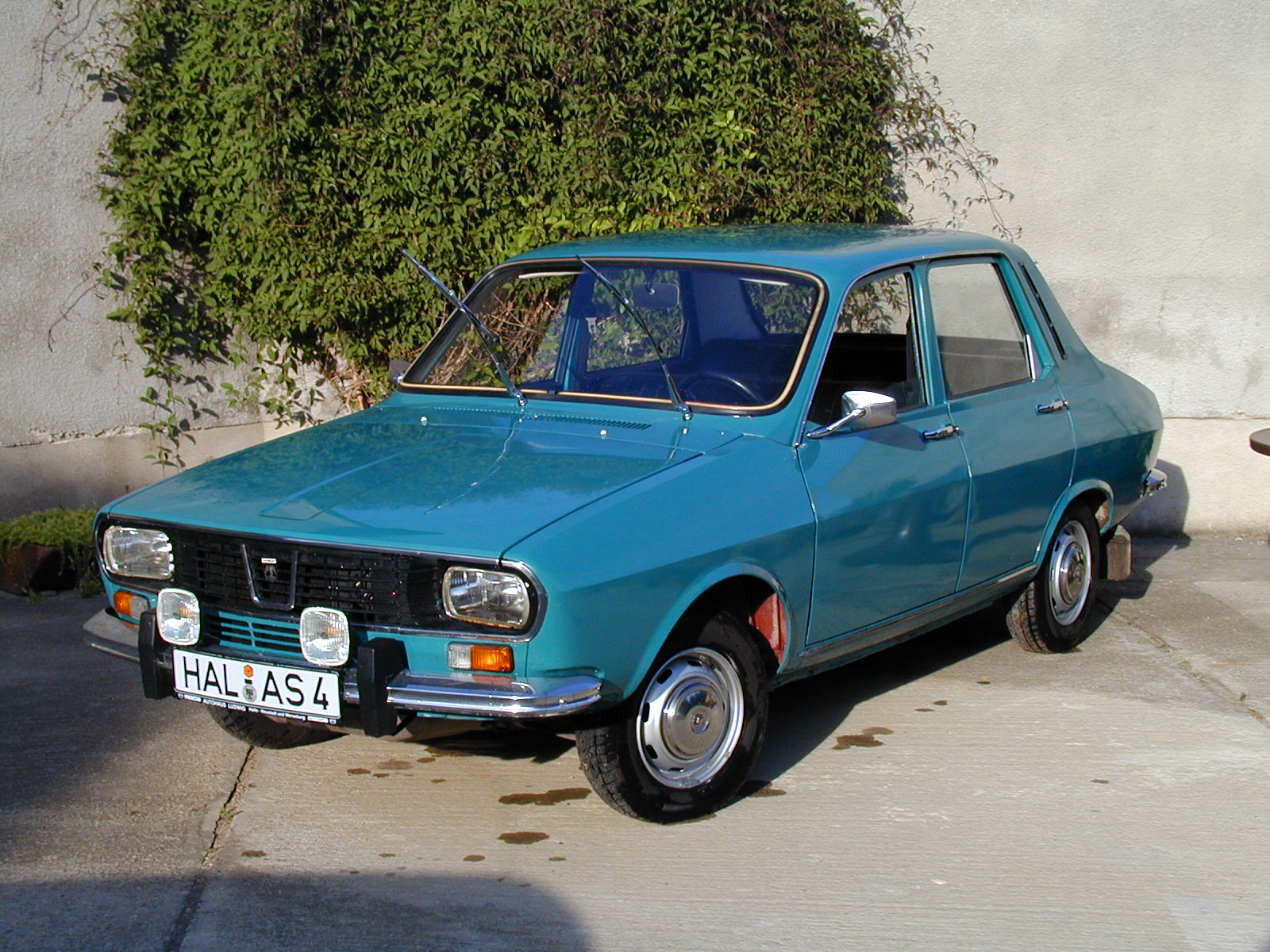
Dacia 1300, a model from 1973

The first Dacia 1300 left the assembly line ready for the 23 August parade in 1969, and was exhibited at the Paris and Bucharest shows of that year. Romanians were delighted with the modernity and reliability of the car, and waiting lists were always lengthy. By 1970, there were two variants: the standard 1300 and the 1300L (for Lux); in 1974 the 1301 Lux Super was introduced, which had novelties such as a heated rear screen, a radio, wing mirrors on both sides and a more luxurious trim. This was reserved for the Communist Party nomenklatura.

Changes soon followed as export markets opened up. In 1973, the estate variant, 1300 Break, was produced. There were 1300F (estate with no rear seats, for carrying goods) and 1300S (ambulance) variants, and in 1975 the Dacia 1302 pick-up was developed. 2,000 units were made until 1982.

Dacia also produced the Estafette, a complete knock-down version of the Renault Estafette van, in limited numbers, but given the competition of the Bucharest-made T.V. van, numbers were very limited. In the very early 1980s, the Renault 20 was also assembled as the Dacia 2000; because of the exclusivity of this model numbers were always very limited. The 2000 was only available in dark blue or black, and was reserved for the Party elite. In 1978 plans were revealed for the Renault 18 to be assembled by Dacia, but the Renault contract lapsed and Dacia went its own way.

At the Bucharest show in 1979, the restyled 1310 models were presented. These had quad lamps at the front, larger lamps at the rear, re-profiled bumpers, and a new interior. The changes were heavily inspired by Renault's own restyling of its 12 in 1975. After a brief series of "crossover" cars in 1981 (for example, there were no more rectangular headlights available for the 1300, so the last models used the quad lamps of the 1310), the 1310 hit the Romanian market in late 1981. In the UK, where it was known as the Dacia Denem, the top of the range model included such luxuries as a five-speed gearbox, alloy wheels and electric windows. The advertising slogan used for the car was "The Very Acceptable Dacia Denem". Sales were very limited, and the number surviving are not thought to exceed ten, although the Romanian Embassy in South Kensington kept a fleet running until the mid-1990s. Sales of the pick-up version, known as the Shifter, continued until the 1990s, and the ARO 10 was also sold as the Dacia Duster. Production was stopped in late 1982.

At the same time the Sport model was produced. At the 1980 Bucharest international trade fair, crowds admired the Brașovia, a prototype of a sports coupé based on the 1310 and developed at a service station in Brașov. The go-ahead was given for a prestige model, and so from 1983 the two-door Dacia 1310 Sport (and later the 1410 Sport), was available for general consumption. These were popular for rallies, and racing drivers such as Nicu Grigoraș tuned them to extract extraordinary power from the old Renault engine.

=== 1980s ===
The designers were still coming up with fresh ideas, many of them shrouded in secrecy. Prototypes such as the 500cc Mini-Dacia, as well as Dacia 1310 variants, were designed; some, such as the Dacia 1310 Maxi Break, are still on the road. These cars are eagerly prized by Dacia enthusiasts, and Dacia web forums are full of evidence about the rarities and oddities produced by Dacia during the 1980s. The Maxi Break was an eight-seater version of the station wagon (also available as an ambulance), stretched by about a half a metre between the doors. 10–12 such cars were actually built, by Dacia Service Pitesti.

In 1982, after the 1302 was dropped, the Dacia 1304 Pick-up and Drop-side models were introduced. Actually, they had been launched from 1981. These were a commercial success and remained in production, gradually being modified along with the rest of the range, until December 2006. In 1985 were added the 1410 was available as a larger-engined variant, while the relatively short-lived 1210 was the economy variant until about 1992.

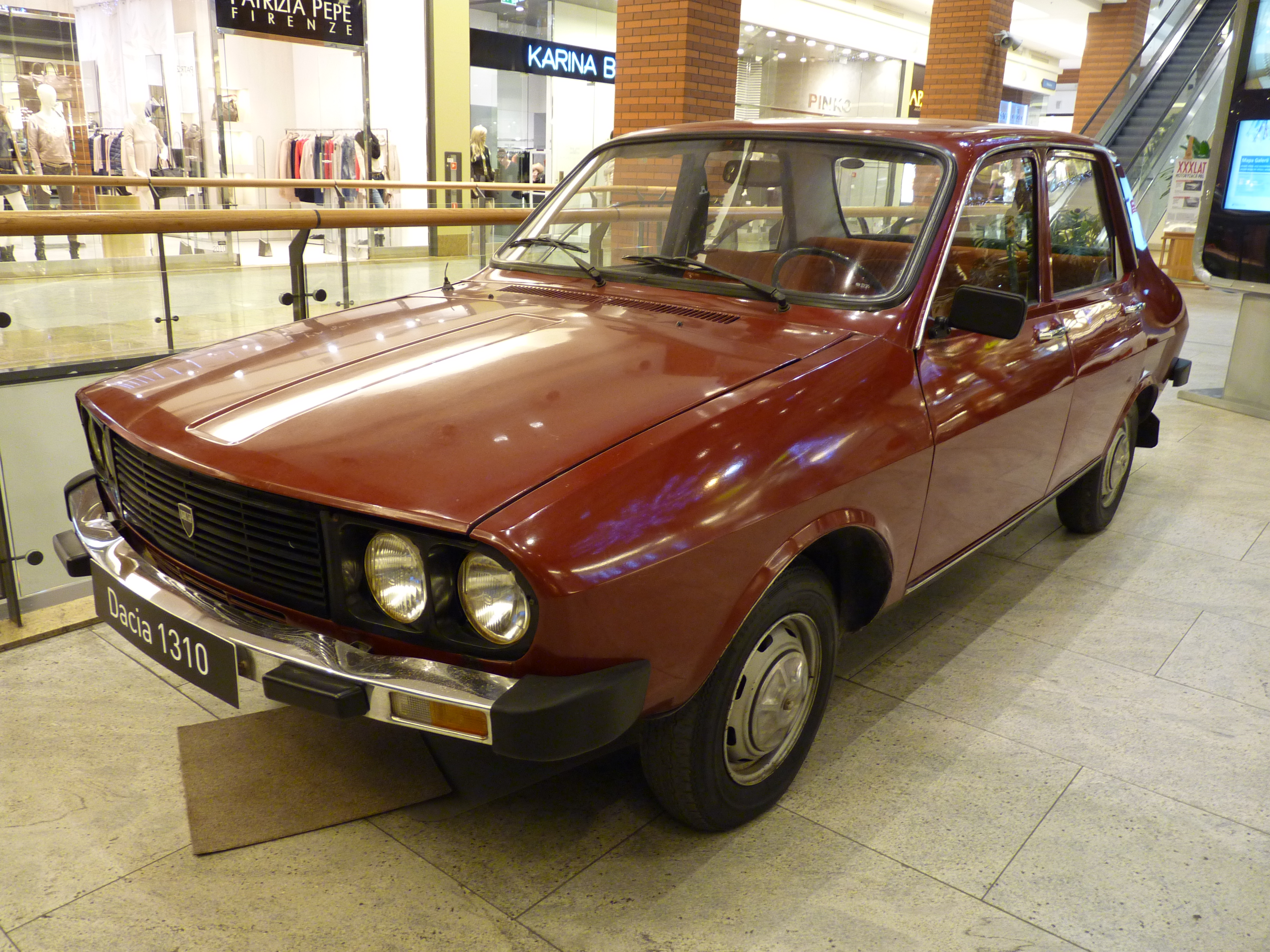
Dacia 1310 P (Polish market version)

For the 1984 model year, the de luxe MS and MLS models presented slight modifications on the 1310 platform, with a new spoiler and chunkier, rubber mouldings around the front grille and headlamps. In 1985, the rear vent was changed from a narrow horizontal aperture to a rhomboid aperture, much like that of the Renault 12 phase 2. From late 1985 all models had the large rubber mouldings around the front grille and headlamps, plus a spoiler: the line-up was changed to TX ( 1289 cmc engine and 4 speeds gearbox ) and TLX(1397 cmc engine, 5 speedsgearbox) though other designations were occasionally seen. A five-speed gearbox also became an option. Models destined for Canada (initially called GTL) sported twin fuel tanks. In parallel, work was developing on the 1320 CN1 model, which was a hatchback based on the 1310.

The new front end seen on the 1320 also appeared on the top-of-the-range and special-order models from about 1986; these cars were distinguishable by two large headlights, a much plusher interior clad in blue plastic and a new dashboard known as the CN1, and – occasionally – faired-in door handles. Many were owned by senior officials in the Communist Central Committee. While the 1320 was the most expensive model in the Dacia range when it appeared in 1988, many were used as taxis. The 1320 did not last long, however; as early as 1989 there were prototypes using the front of the 1320 and a new rear, with wrap-around tail lights and other relatively modern features.

=== 1990s ===
The 1320 model was replaced in 1991 by the Dacia 1325 Liberta (after the 1989 revolution, themes of liberty were very much in fashion) and stayed in production until 1996. The last of the quad-lamped models were produced in 1992, and all the Dacia range received the new front end of the 1320, called CN1. An effort was made to rejuvenate the model range: the Sport was dropped, due to lack of sales, and new commercial vehicles were introduced. The 1307 was a double-cabbed pick-up; the 1309 was an estate with a tarpaulin instead of a boot; the car was a cross-over between estate and pick-up and sold very well on the Chinese market. There were also several prototypes, including:

- the 1610 diesel estate, powered by Volkswagen, with about 150 units sold
- the Dacia Star, with curved side windows
- the 1308 Jumbo, a camper-van, and several attempts to give the 1310 a more modern look by grafting the front of contemporary cars such as the Nissan Primera onto it.

The cars of 1992 to 1994 are curiosities: although efforts were obviously being made to renew the model range, there were numerous stylistic hangovers from the quad-lamped models. Thus, the last of the 1983-designed dashboards were seen in 1994 although a new dashboard had been seen on some model ranges since 1987. Similarly, although the CN1 restyling eliminated anachronisms such as a kink upwards at the C-pillar and a rubber rear spoiler, it was not applied consistently.

The 1994 facelift was known within the industry as CN2. A reprojected front end was distinguished by a horizontal metal line in the grille. There were new headlamps, a new radiator grille, and front and rear bumpers. Inside, there was a new dashboard for the base models, while the top-of-the-range cars had luxuries such as body-coloured bumpers, rear head restraints, a radio-cassette, hubcaps, and the ever-present CN1 dashboard, this time in black plastic. This model was not to stay in production for very long; in 1995 the CN3 type was introduced. Practically the only differences were those of trim level and the radiator grille.

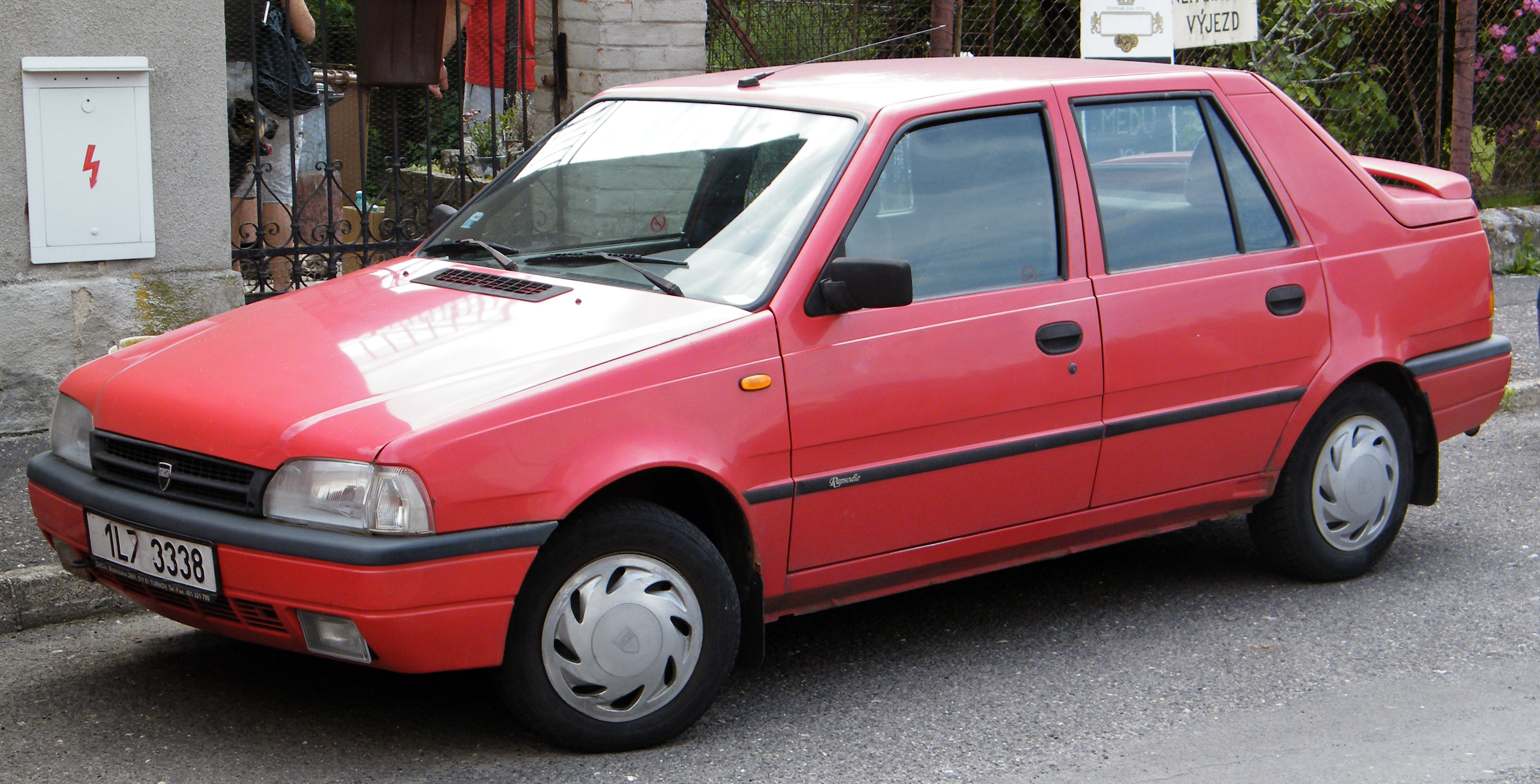
Dacia Nova and Dacia SupeRNova share the same body.

From late 1994 little attention was paid to the improvement of the 1310 range, as Dacia launched a new model, the Dacia Nova. This was a compact saloon/sedan or hatchback with a three-box design. The design was rather outdated, because development work had started in 1983. The Nova started after the end of any French involvement in Dacia. The model was unpopular, due to reliability and rustproofing issues. However, after improvements in 1996, the Nova became more often seen on Romanian roads. In 1998 a seven-seater prototype was produced using the panels and windows from the standard Nova saloon.

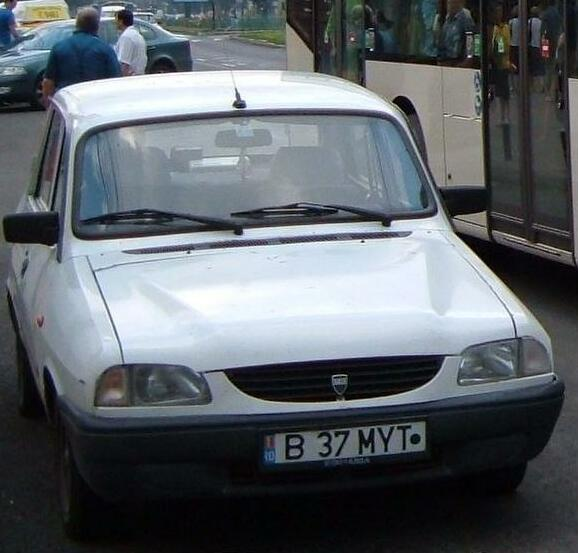
2000 Dacia 1410 (CN4)

In 1998, the anniversary year of three decades of production since the first Dacia rolled off the assembly line, vehicle number 2,000,000 emerged from the plant; this year saw the last restyling of the 1310. It was known as CN4 and involved a comprehensive restyling of the front end, new door handles, and a lightly restyled rear view mirror. The estate version was fitted with larger tail lights. Even though the model was over thirty years old, it sold exceptionally well due to a starting price of about 4,200 euros and high availability of parts. "Goodies" such as a fuel-injection also helped keep the model relatively modern.

In 1999, a special edition was produced for the first time, known as Dacia Dedicație. This luxury version of the saloon and estate had alloy wheels, body-coloured bumpers, power steering, electric windows, and a far better level of finish. The models were all painted two-tone silver, and sold at a significantly higher price. From 2002, the cars became known as Berlina and Break, with the 1310 lettering being relegated to an insignificant position underneath the side light.

On 21 July 2004, the last models of the 1300 series rolled out the gates of the Mioveni production facility, one month before their 35th anniversary. The last Dacia 1310 (saloon version), number 1,979,730, will be kept in the Dacia Museum.

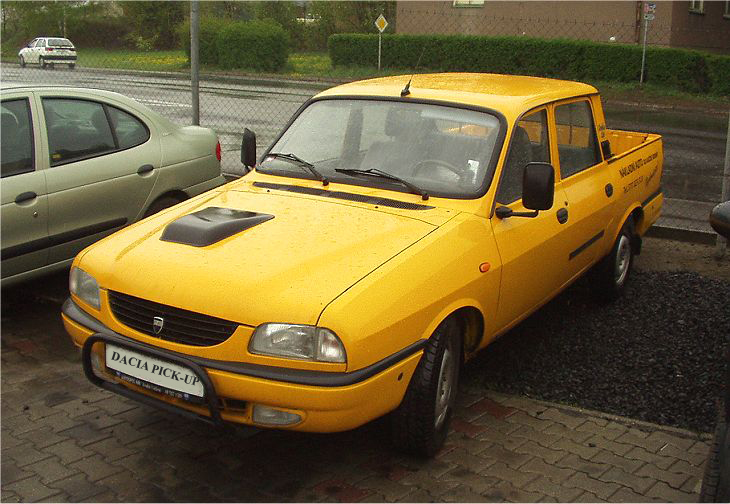
Dacia Pick-Up Double Cab 4X4

On 8 December 2006, the utility Dacia Pick-Up suffered the same fate. Although many improvements had been made in recent years, such as four-wheel drive, the introduction of a 1.9 diesel engine, the dashboard from the Dacia Solenza (also seen on the last 1310s) and wheels fastened by five studs as opposed to three, Romania's entry to the European Union effectively prevented the continued production of the old models. The assembly lines were remodelled and expanded to increase production of the Dacia Logan.

In over 34 years of production, and more than 2.5 million units produced, the Dacia 1300/1310 easily became the most common car on Romanian roads. A large number of people had become adept at carrying out repairs or home-made modifications. For example, many older cars had newer front ends grafted onto them to make them seem more modern, or purely because newer parts were easier to get. Consequently, original early 1300s are quite rare, with prices steadily increasing for the best-preserved models. Tuning of Dacias is also a popular pastime, although the home-made nature of much of the work casts doubt on the level of quality, safety and reliability of the finished product.

According to popular belief, during the Communist era, in the plant where Dacias were made, there were two assembly lines: one line producing Dacias intended for sale in Romania and the other line producing the same car (albeit from superior parts, and assembled with greater care) for export. Romanians living near the border would commonly purchase their Dacia in neighbouring countries expecting a higher level of quality.

=== Acquisition by Renault ===
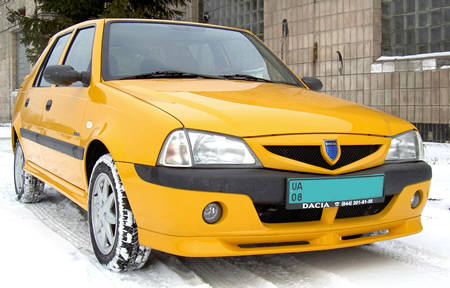
2003 Dacia Solenza

Meanwhile, work was continuing on the other Dacia models. In September 1999, Dacia became the third brand of the Renault group, with a view to making Romania its hub of automobile development in Central and Eastern Europe, and investment was consequently increased. The first sign of this came in 2000, with the introduction of the SupeRNova, an improved version of the Nova with engine and transmission from Renault. The top-of-the range version had air conditioning, electric windows and a CD player. Sales were very good, although the outdatedness of the concept was striking. Dacia sold 53,000 vehicles in 2002, an almost 50 per cent market share in Romania.

In 2003, a restyled version replaced the SupeRNova with Dacia Solenza, featuring a new interior, the options for an airbag. This was, however, only meant to be a stopgap model filling the need for a saloon model before the introduction of the all-important Dacia Logan, as well as to familiarise workers with the demands of manufacturing a model acceptable to Western European markets. Production was stopped in 2005.

=== 2004–2011 ===
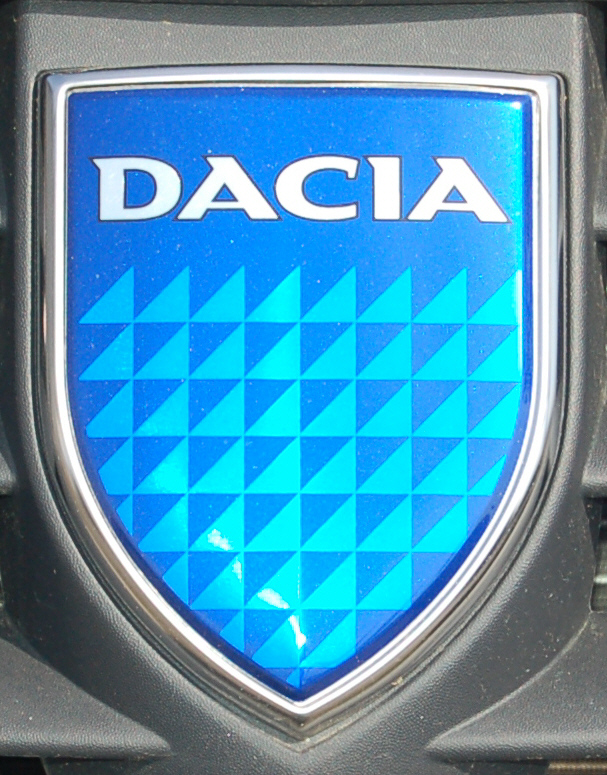
Previous logo

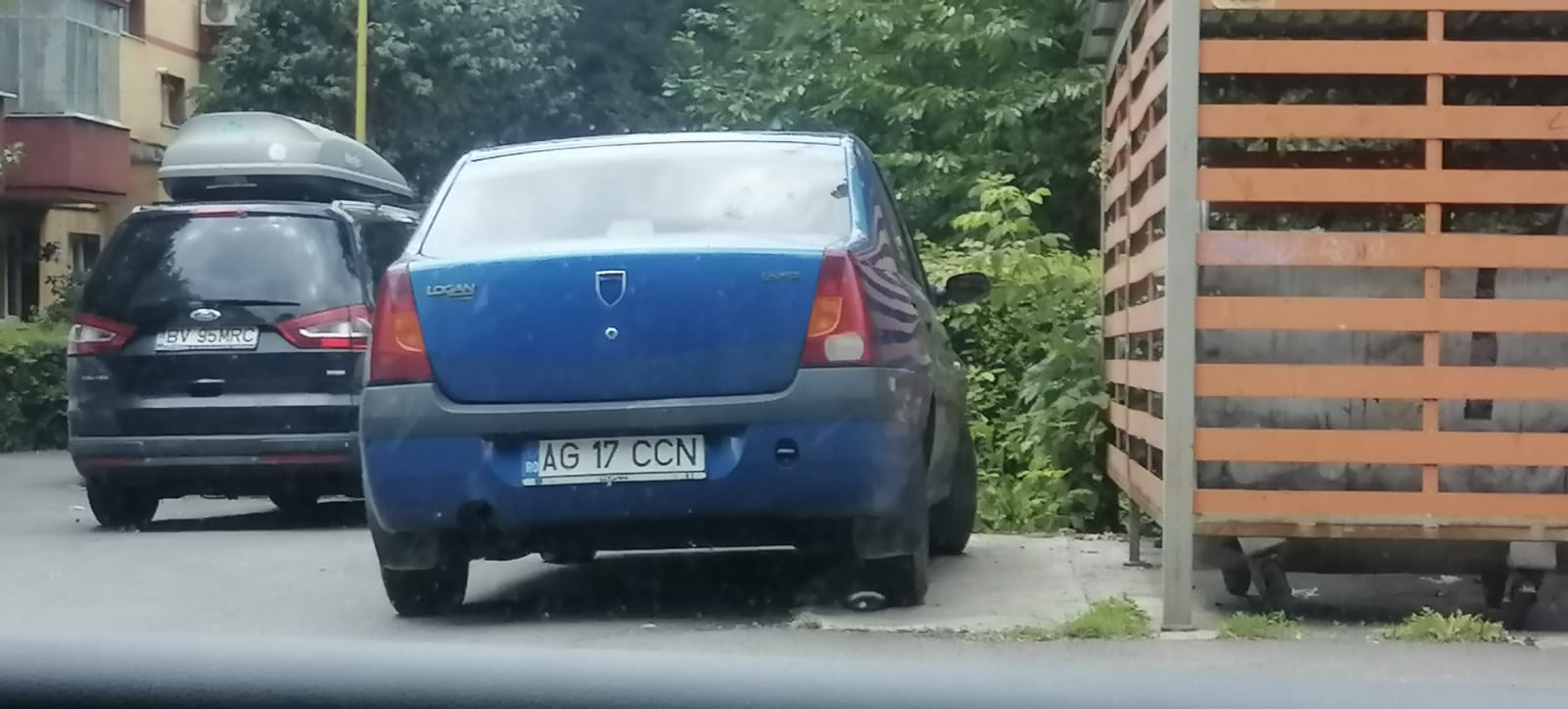
an Dacia Logan I from Pitești.

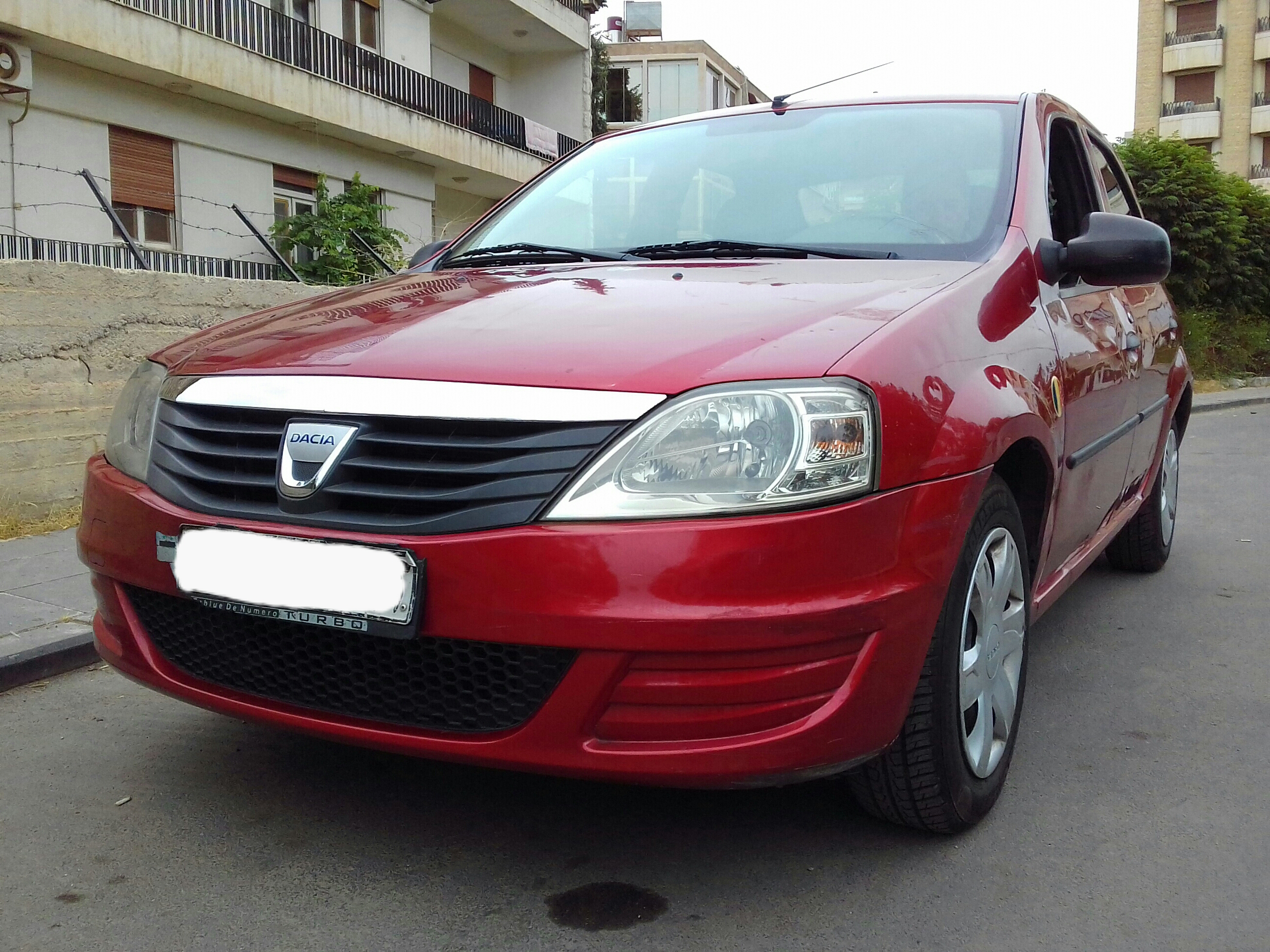
Dacia Logan 2008 Facelift

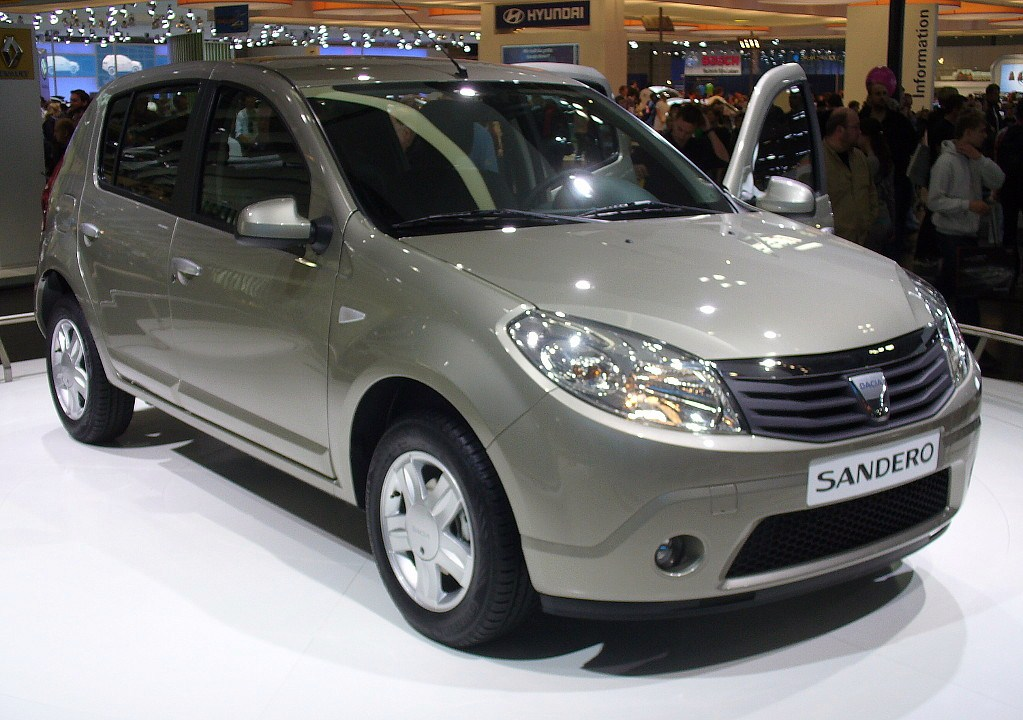
2008 Dacia Sandero

The Dacia Logan is the most successful model since the original 1300. It was introduced after considerable media interest in August 2004, and despite design-related criticism, it became one of the top-selling cars in Central and Eastern Europe, as well as Russia. The Logan is sold in many countries, occasionally under the Renault brand. It was awarded 3 (out of 5) stars in NCAP crash testing. It remains by far the best-selling car in Romania, comprising a 43% share of Dacia's total Romanian sales in 2015. A diesel version was also introduced in 2005. Before its launch, it was known as the 5000-Euro car due to its projected launch price. This was never quite the case, although it is one of the cheapest cars for its size on the market.

In 2006, the prototype Logan Steppe was exhibited. This showed a speculative 4×4 estate version of the Logan. The estate version was launched in late 2006. The van, basically an estate with the rear windows filled in and a separate cabin for the driver, was launched in February 2007 after the stopping production of the classic utility vehicle, the Dacia Pick-Up.

The Renault Technologie Roumanie engineering centre was set up in 2006, in Bucharest, Romania. Employing approximately 2,500 engineers, its main fields of activity are the development, testing and design of the new vehicles in the Dacia range, as well as the marketing and technical support. The following year, the company also set up a styling office, Renault Design Central Europe.

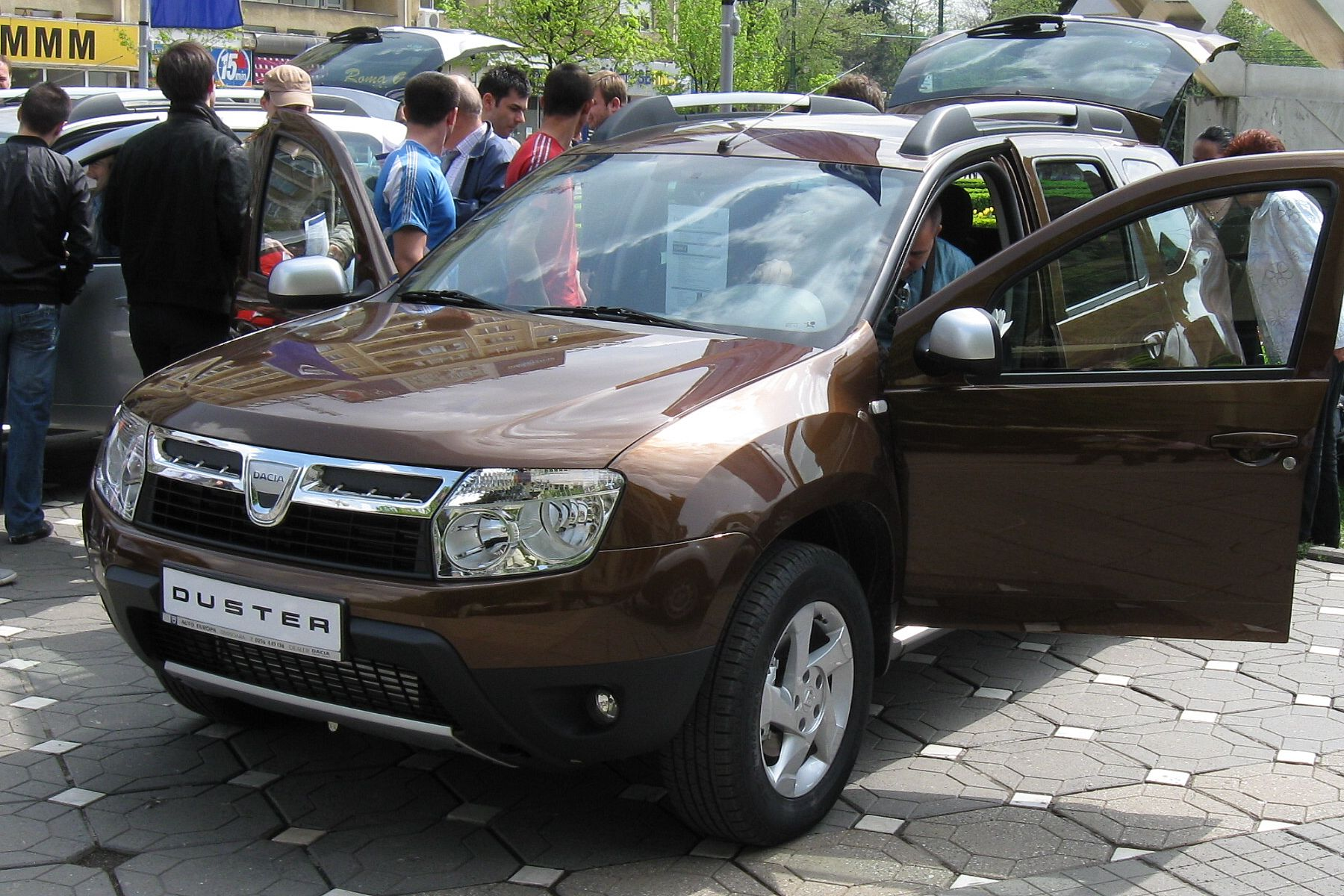
2010 Dacia Duster

A pick-up model and the Logan-based hatchback Sandero were launched in 2008, the latter at the Geneva Motor Show. This also marked a point of rebranding for the company, which adopted a new logo and later the same year launched the facelifted Logan model.

In 2009, a new concept called the Dacia Duster was unveiled at the Geneva Motor Show, signaling manufacturer's intentions of releasing an SUV model. This was reportedly the inauguration of the platform that would be used for the second generation of the Logan and Sandero models, released in 2012.

In 2010, the Dacia Duster was exhibited at the Geneva Motor Show. It is the first crossover SUV built by Dacia since the Renault acquisition, in 4×2 and 4×4 versions. It was revealed on 8 December 2009, and became available in Europe on 18 March 2010.

In September 2010, a testing center was opened in Titu, Romania, as part of Renault Technologie Roumanie. It is intended for developing and optimizing the new vehicles in the Dacia range and has nine types of track with a total length of 32 kilometres and around 100 test benches, used to test the resistance of vehicles and replacement parts to cold, heat and rain.

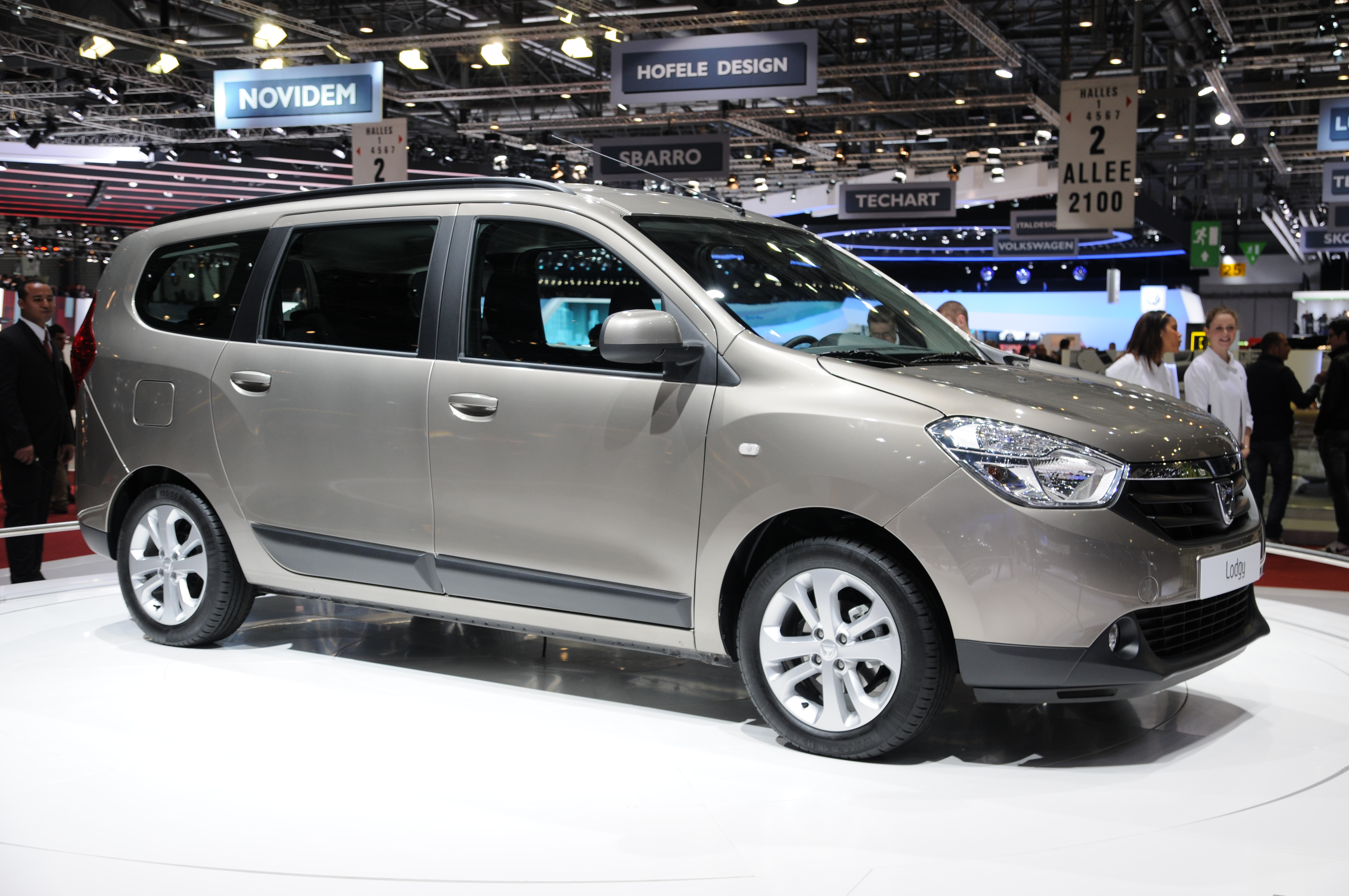
Dacia Lodgy

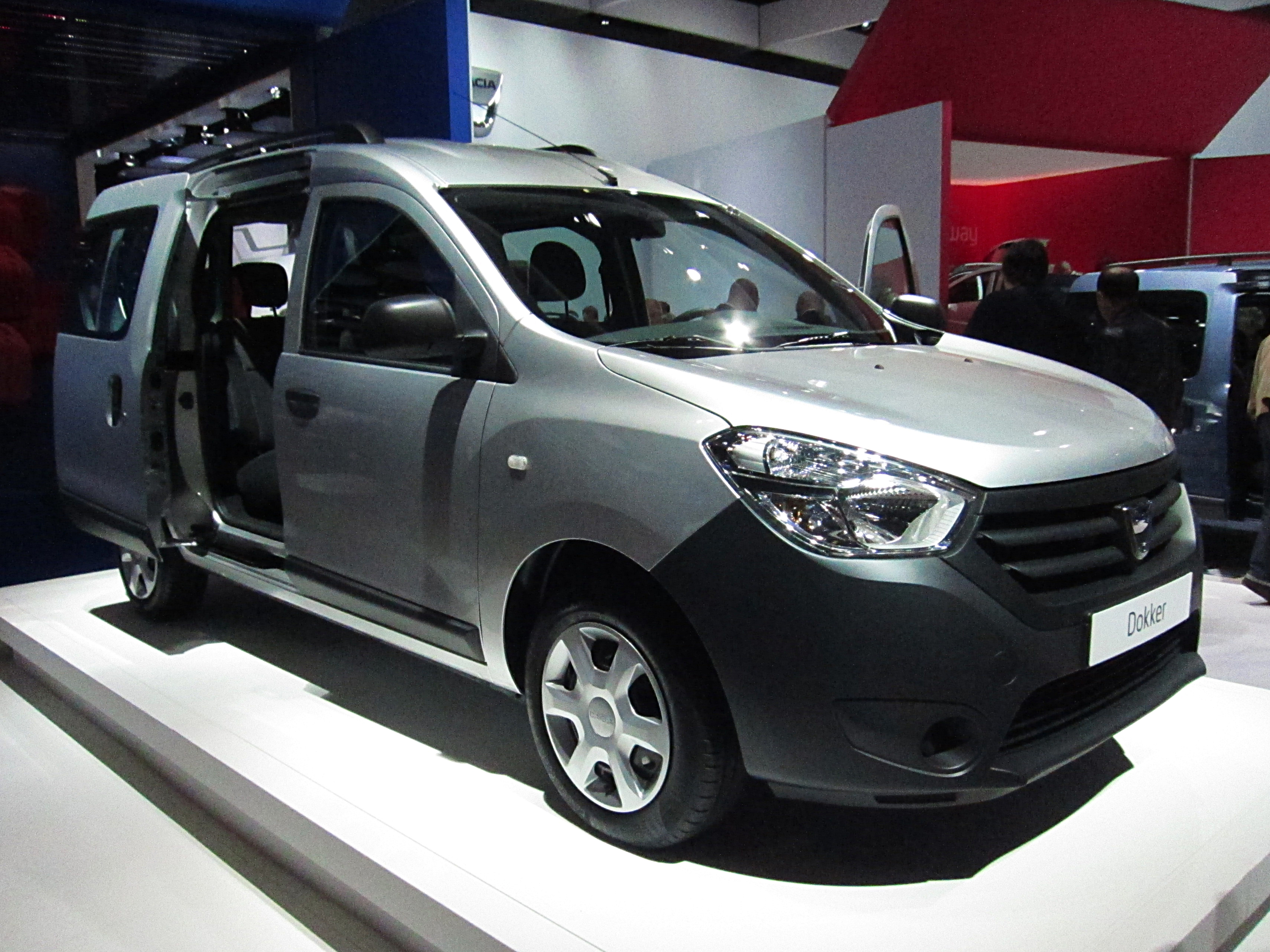
Dacia Dokker

=== 2012–2020 ===
In 2012, Dacia Lodgy, a new compact MPV, was revealed at the Geneva Motor Show. It is based on a new platform and is manufactured at an all-new Renault factory in Tangier, Morocco.

The Dokker, released in June 2012, is a slightly smaller leisure activity vehicle, also manufactured in Tangier, sharing the same platform with the Lodgy, available in passenger and panel van variants.

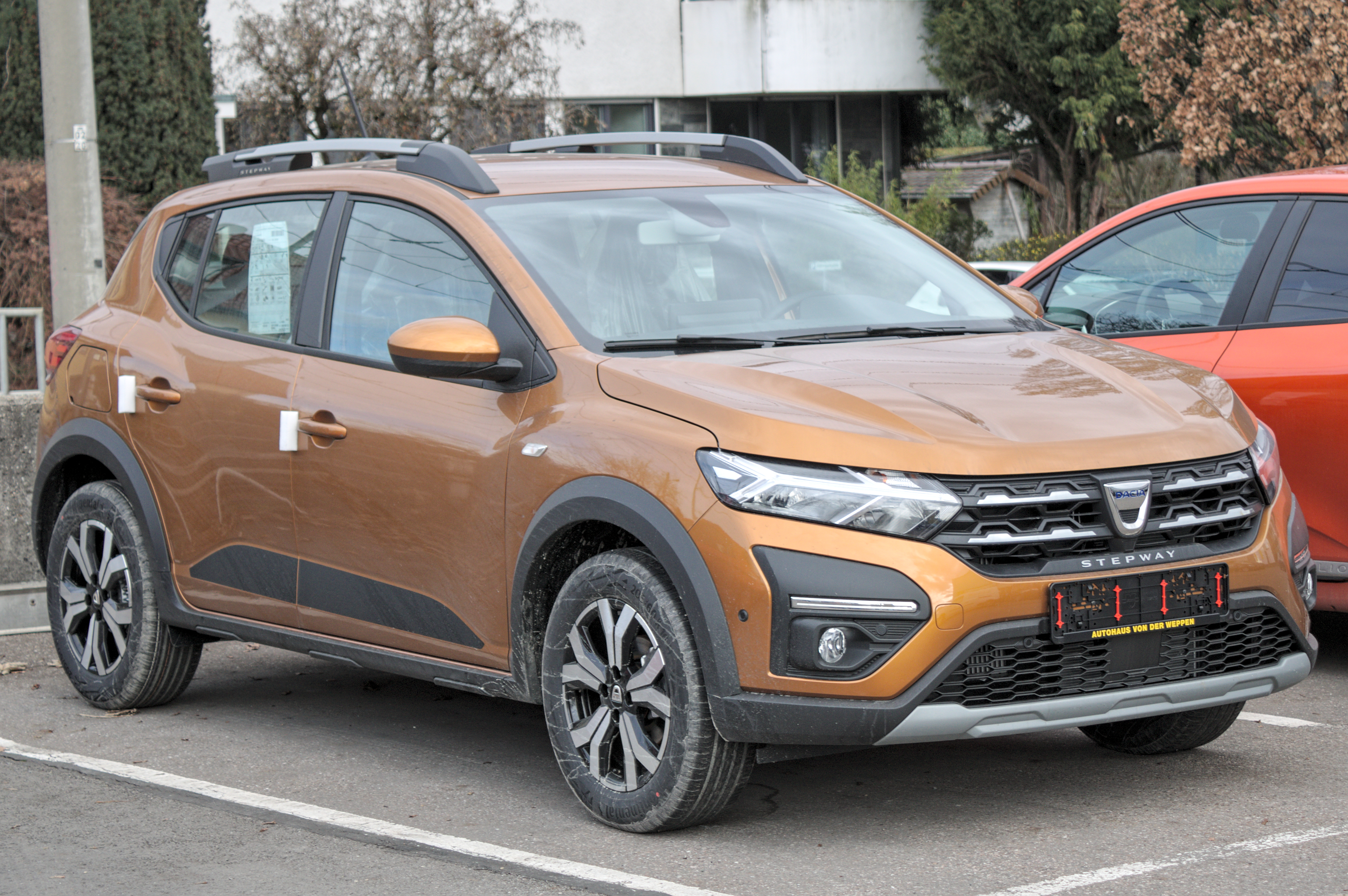
2020 Dacia Sandero Stepway

In September 2012, the second generations of the Logan and Sandero were revealed at the Paris Motor Show. They feature a common front end design and come with improved standard safety features, a new engine and other new comfort equipment.

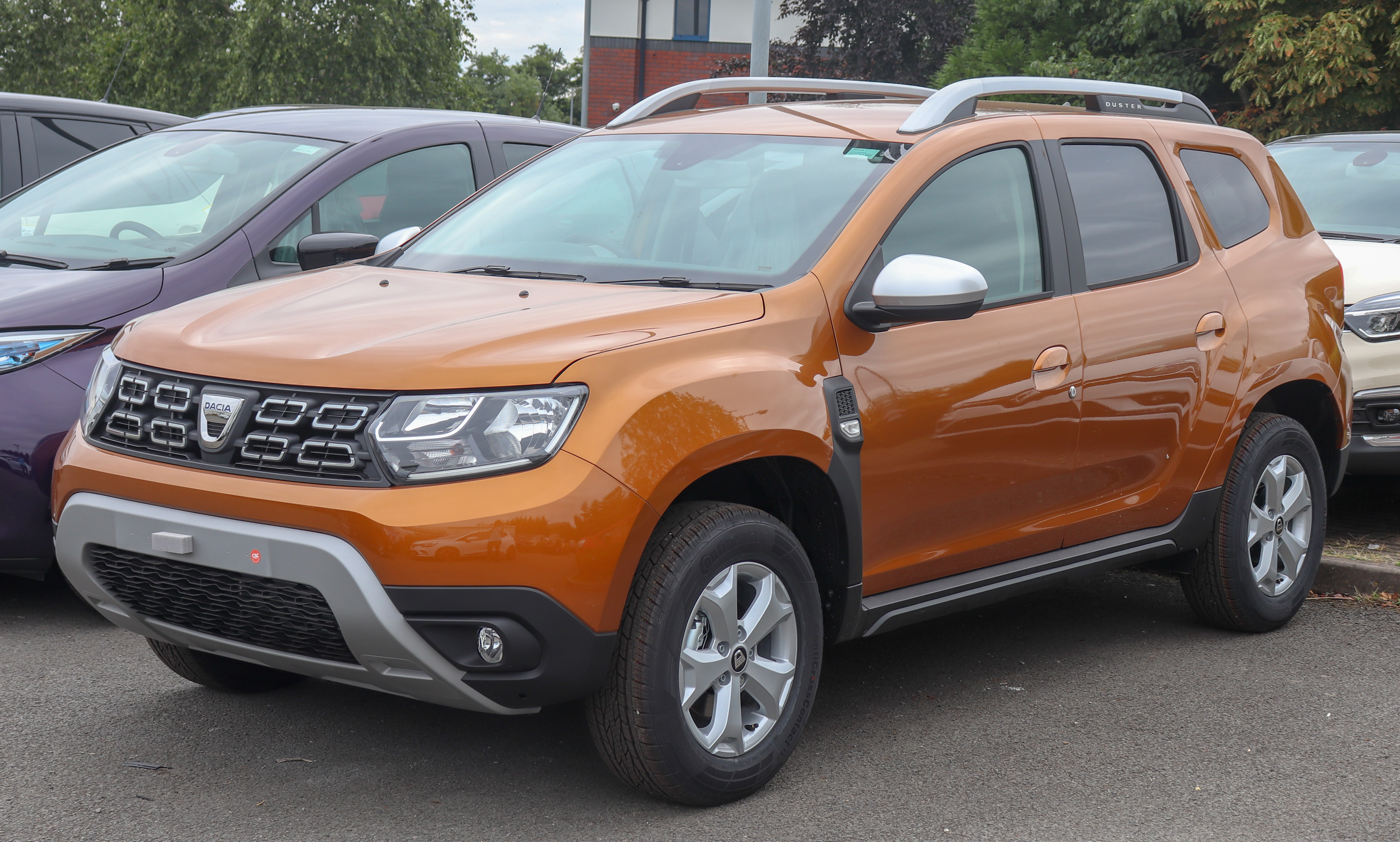
2017 Dacia Duster

The following year, the facelifted Duster was presented at the Frankfurt Motor Show. It received mild modifications to the front and rear ends, the new interior introduced on the new Logan and Sandero models, as well as a new turbocharged petrol engine.

At the 2017 Frankfurt Motor Show, the second generation Duster model was introduced, bringing new comfort and technical improvements, but retaining similar dimensions and engines.

According to reports, in September 2018, Automobile Dacia gained the 14th place in Top 500 CEE companies.

Dacia's CEO from April 2016 until May 2018 was Yves Caracatzanis. He was replaced by Antoine Doucerain, who left after only four months due to "personal reasons". After a brief stint by interim manager Jerome Olive, the position was filled by Christophe Dridi in December 2018.

In 2020, Dacia announced that they would be releasing an electric car which they showcased in March 2020 with the Dacia Spring Electric concept. The Dacia Spring is said to be based on the Renault City K-ZE and is set to become the cheapest electric car in Europe with the price being estimated by Romanian media at around €15,000 to €20,000.

=== 2021–present ===
In January 2021, Denis Le Vot became the CEO of the Dacia-Lada business unit. As part of a company revamp, Renault said it would integrate the Dacia and the Lada brands into a new business unit. It also unveiled a new Dacia logo and a product offensive for the Dacia brand, widening its market segments coverage.

In March 2021, the production version of the Dacia Spring EV was shown at the Renault eWays event by Groupe Renault Executive Denis Le Vot. The Spring will be sold in left-hand drive areas of Europe, alongside updated Sandero and Logan models (announced at the end of 2020) and will have a car-sharing version called the Spring Business.

== Leadership ==
Current: Katrin Adt (since September 2025)

=== Previous CEOs/general managers ===
- Nicolas Maure (2014–2016)
- Yves Caracatzanis (2016–2018)
- Antoine Doucerain (2018)
- Mihai Bordeanu (2018–2021)
- Denis Le Vot (2021–2025)

== Facilities ==
=== Romania ===
The company's single plant is located in Mioveni, Romania, together with its headquarters, and has a production capacity of 350,000 vehicles per year. It is divided into several sections, such as bodywork, painting, assembly, mechanical and chassis, foundry etc. It works in conjunction with the Renault Technologie Roumanie engineering centre, located in Bucharest and set up in 2006, which also comprises a styling office, Renault Design Central Europe, and with the testing centre located in Titu that was opened in 2010.

A large logistical centre was also set near the plant in March 2005, the International Logistic Network, from where complete knock down (CKD) kits are exported to other Renault production sites in Russia, Morocco, Colombia, Argentina, Brazil, South Africa, Iran and India. It is reportedly the biggest logistic centre of its kind not only in the Renault Group, but in the global automotive industry. In 2012, the total equivalent of the kits sent worldwide from the centre was 920,646 vehicles.

=== Overseas ===
Two of the Dacia models, the Lodgy and the Dokker vans, were manufactured at the Renault factory in Tangier, Morocco. The Logan and the Sandero are also manufactured in Casablanca, Morocco, the later also in Tangier.

== Innovation ==
Faced with the growing demand for automatic gearboxes in Europe and significant demand in Russia, South America and India, Renault has decided to develop a specific automatic gearbox, called Easy-R. Innovative, it replaces hydroelectric technologies (hydraulics controlled by electronics) with electromechanical elements. The result is a more reliable and more affordable automatic transmission. Dacia is indeed offering this equipment from 2015 in Europe at a price of 600 euros, which is at least half the price of the competition. The number of parts has been reduced by a quarter, ensuring better reliability and simplified maintenance. Four modes are available on the Easy-R controlled gearbox, also indicated on the dashboard: D/Drive, N/Neutral, R/Rear and M/Manual impulse. This Easy-R gearbox keeps fuel consumption identical to that of the manual gearbox, while offering the advantages of a traditional automatic gearbox.

== Sales ==
The Dacia brand is marketed in most of the Western and Eastern European countries, as well as in some Northern African countries, such as Algeria, Tunisia and Morocco. Western European exports began in the late 1970s, entering markets like Belgium and the Netherlands in 1978. Its models have also been produced by Renault in its production sites on other continents (in Russia, Iran, India, South Africa, Colombia and Brazil) and sold under its own brand or other specific local brands (such as Mahindra, Lada or Nissan for example).

In 2012, Dacia sold a total of 359,822 vehicles, of which approximately 230,000 were exported to Western Europe, the most of them in France and in Germany. Besides the domestic market, its other key markets have been Algeria, Turkey, Italy and Spain.

For 2014 the company sold 511,465 vehicles in 43 countries, thus breaking another record and exceeding the 500,000 threshold. On the 6th of May 2014, the main Dacia plant Mioveni produced its five millionth car, approximately the three millionth car since Renault owned the brand.

The 3.5 millionth Dacia car, since the Dacia brand revival ten years before, was sold in the UK in November 2015.

In 2015, the company set a new sales record, with a total of 550,920 units marketed. Dacia cars sales exceeded 700,000 units in 2018 (7% more than in the previous year).

Dacia Sandero has been Europe's best selling car several years in a row.

=== Figures ===
The historical sales figures of all the models are the following (under the Dacia brand only):

Model	1968–1972	1969–2004	1986–1992	2004	2005	2006	2007	2008	2009	2010	2011	2012	2013	2014	2015	2016	2017	2018	2019	2020	2021	2022	2023	Total
Dacia 1100/1100S	37,546	−	−	−	−	−	−	−	−	−	−	−	−	−	−	−	−	−	−	–	–	−	−	37,546
Dacia 1300/1310	−	1,959,730	−	−	−	−	−	−	−	−	−	−	−	−	−	−	−	−	−	–	–	−	−	1,959,730
Dacia Lăstun	−	−	6,532	−	−	−	−	−	−	−	−	−	−	−	−	−	−	−	−	–	–	−	−	6,532
Dacia Solenza	−	−	−	31,431	8,354	−	−	−	−	−	−	−	−	−	−	−	−	−	−	–	–	−	−	39,785
Dacia Pick-Up	−	279,184	−	−	21,165	11,733	−	−	−	−	−	−	−	−	−	−	−	−	−	–	–	−	−	312,082
Dacia Spring	–	–	–	–	–	–	–	–	–	–	–	–	–	–	–	–	–	–	–	1,722	27,876	48,887	61,803	140,288
Dacia Logan	−	−	−	22,868	134,887	184,975	230,343	218,666	158,251	126,841	95,365	102,196	69,355	98,601	101,628	80,506	75,319	79,229	75,532	52,782	27,136	27,398	?	1,961,878
Dacia Sandero	−	−	−	−	−	−	−	38,928	151,206	154,406	86,578	94,180	150,672	169,055	185,846	216,543	270,191	278,925	274,375	189,354	226,825	229,495	269,899	2,986 478
Dacia Duster	−	−	−	−	−	−	−	−	−	66,939	161,203	131,205	115,405	160,467	165,275	179,215	184,112	215,977	260,119	178,091	186,001	197,058	200,633	2,401 700
Dacia Jogger	–	–	–	–	–	–	–	–	–	–	–	–	–	–	–	–	–	–	–	–	26	56,812	94,095	150,933
Dacia Lodgy	−	−	−	−	−	−	−	−	−	−	−	29,129	42,977	27,059	33,000	35,715	39,668	36,011	36,073	28,072	24,526	13,189	?	345,419
Dacia Dokker	−	−	−	−	−	−	−	−	−	−	−	2,924	51,063	56,180	65,114	72,160	85,938	90,432	90,387	70,892	44,684	974	?	630.748
Total	37,546	2,238,914	6,532	94,720	164,406	196,708	230,473	257,594	309,457 (Note: Including "Others" sales figures.)	348,269 (Note: Including "Misc." sales figures.)	343,230	359,822	429,534	511,419	550,912	584,139	655,228	700,568	736,486	522,635	537,074	573,813	626,430	10,973,105

=== Markets ===
Worldwide sales of Dacia cars: Dark green – Countries where the Dacia brand is currently available. Light green – Countries where the Dacia brand was previously available. Red – Countries where Dacia models are marketed under the Renault brand.

As of September 2023, Dacia operates in 44 countries across four continents. Although the brand's strongest presence is in Europe, it is also marketed in selected countries in North Africa and the Middle East, such as Morocco, Algeria, Tunisia, and Israel.

== Models ==
=== Current ===
- Dacia Logan III (2020–present)
- Dacia Sandero III (2020–present)
- Dacia Sandero Stepway III (2020–present)
- Dacia Spring Electric (2021–present)
- Dacia Spring Cargo (2021–present)
- Dacia Jogger (2022–present)
- Dacia Sandrider (2023–present)
- Dacia Duster III (2024–present)
- Dacia Bigster (2025–present)
- Dacia Duster Pick-Up (2020–present)

=== Future ===
- Dacia Striker (2027)

=== Former ===
- Dacia 1100 (1968–1972)
- Dacia 1300 (1969–1979)
- Dacia 1301 (1970–1974)
- Dacia D6 Estafette (1974–1976)
- Dacia 1302 (1975–1982)
- Dacia 1210/1310/1410 (1979–2004; Dacia Denem in the United Kingdom)
- Dacia 1304 Pick Up (1979–2006)
- Dacia 2000 (1980–1982)
- Dacia Duster (1983–1990s; rebadged ARO 10 in the United Kingdom)
- Dacia 1310 Sport/1410 Sport (1983–1992)
- Dacia 1320 (1985–1989)
- Dacia 1305 Drop Side (1985–2006)
- Dacia 500 Lăstun (1988–1991)
- Dacia Liberta (1990–1996)
- Dacia 1309 (1992–1997)
- Dacia 1307 King Cab (1992–2003)
- Dacia 1307 Double Cab (1992–2006)
- Dacia Nova (1994–1999)
- Dacia SupeRNova (2000–2003)
- Dacia Solenza (2003–2005)
- Dacia Logan I (2004–2012)
- Dacia Logan I MCV (2006–2012)
- Dacia Logan Van (2007–2012)
- Dacia Logan Pick-Up (2008–2012)
- Dacia Sandero I (2008–2012)
- Dacia Sandero Stepway I (2008–2012)
- Dacia Duster I (2009–2017)
- Dacia Logan II (2012–2020)
- Dacia Logan II MCV (2012–2020)
- Dacia Sandero II (2012–2020)
- Dacia Sandero Stepway II (2012–2020)
- Dacia Logan II Stepway (2019–2020)
- Dacia Dokker (2012–2021)
- Dacia Lodgy (2012–2022)
- Dacia Duster II (2017–2024)

=== Prototypes ===
- Dacia Brașovia coupé (1980)
- Mini-Dacia (1980s) – prototype made from cut-down Dacia 1310 panels and easily changeable from hatchback to pick-up to convertible according to removable panels
- Dacia Jumbo highrise van (1990)
- Dacia Nova minivan (1998)
- Several prototypes of the 1310 with diesel, LPG or smaller engines, throughout the model history
- Dacia Star (1991)
- Dacia 1310 convertible (1987; three produced)
- Dacia 1306 saloon-derived pick-up (1994/5; very small series)
- Dacia 1310 Break Limousine (late 1980s) – stretched estate with seven seats, several produced in normal-roofed and high-roofed variants
- Dacia D33 (1997) – prototype made by IDEA design house in Turin, one model only
- Dacia 1310 4x4 / Aro 12 (late 1980s) – estate-derived 4x4, very small series
- Dacia Duster concept car (2009)
- Dacia Bigster concept car (2021)
- Dacia Manifesto (2022)
- Dacia Hipster (2025)

== Marketing ==
=== Sponsorships ===
From the 2008–09 season to the 2022–23 season, Dacia was the sponsor of Italian Serie A football club Udinese Calcio and Stadio Friuli.

Dacia became the official car partner of the Rugby League Super League and the Challenge Cup in February 2016 and then deepened their support of the sport by becoming the main sponsors of the men's, women's and wheelchair England teams in June 2017. They also became the principal partner of the Great Britain Rugby League Lions in 2019 for the team's four match tour of New Zealand and Papua New Guinea.

Since 2023, the brand is a major sponsor of UTMB World Series, a brand of trail running races. This partnership was seen as controversial due to the connection between automobiles and carbon emissions, with some accusing Dacia of sportswashing; as a result, UTMB chose to remove the "Dacia" naming from its Chamonix flagship race in 2024.

== Gallery ==
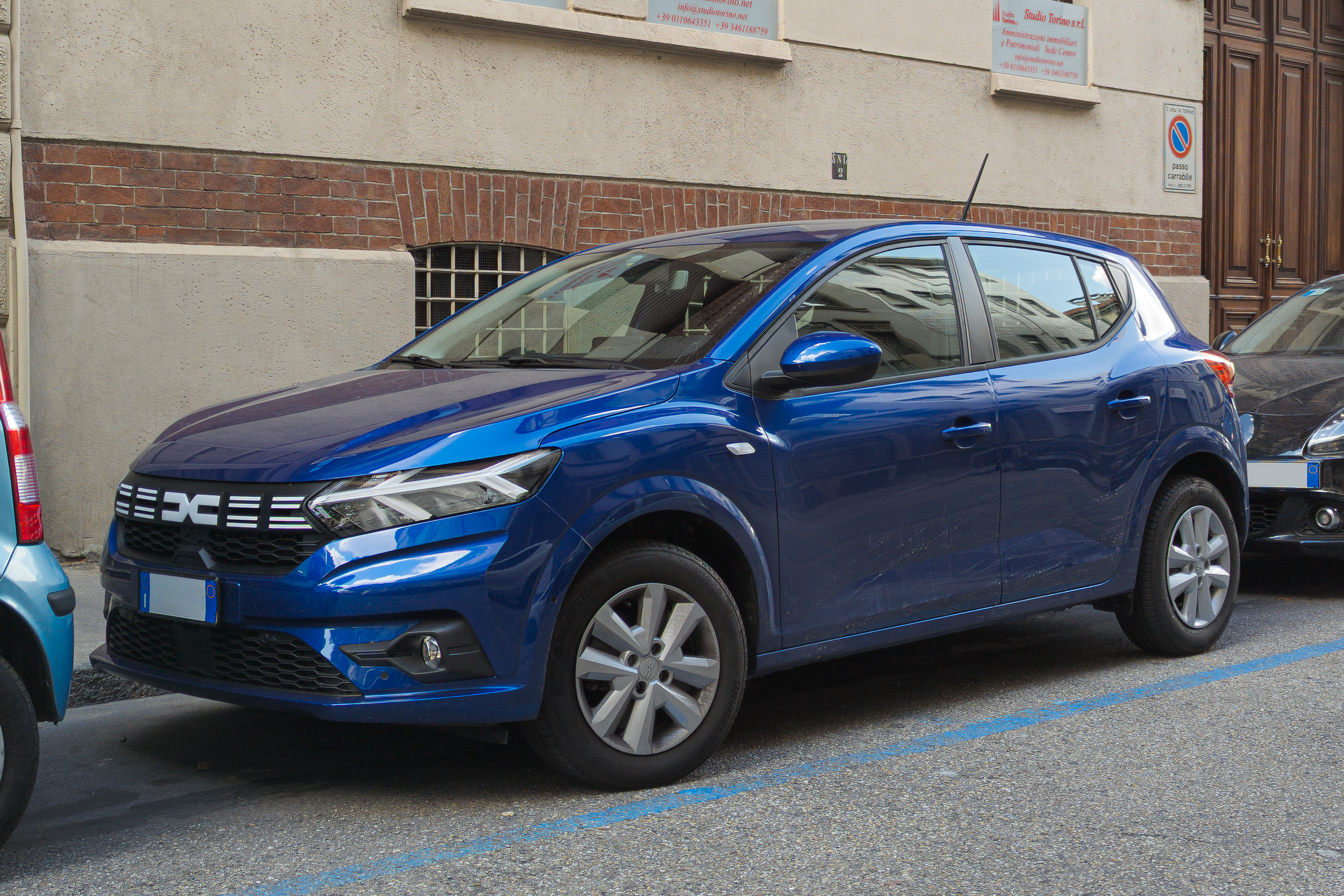
Dacia Sandero

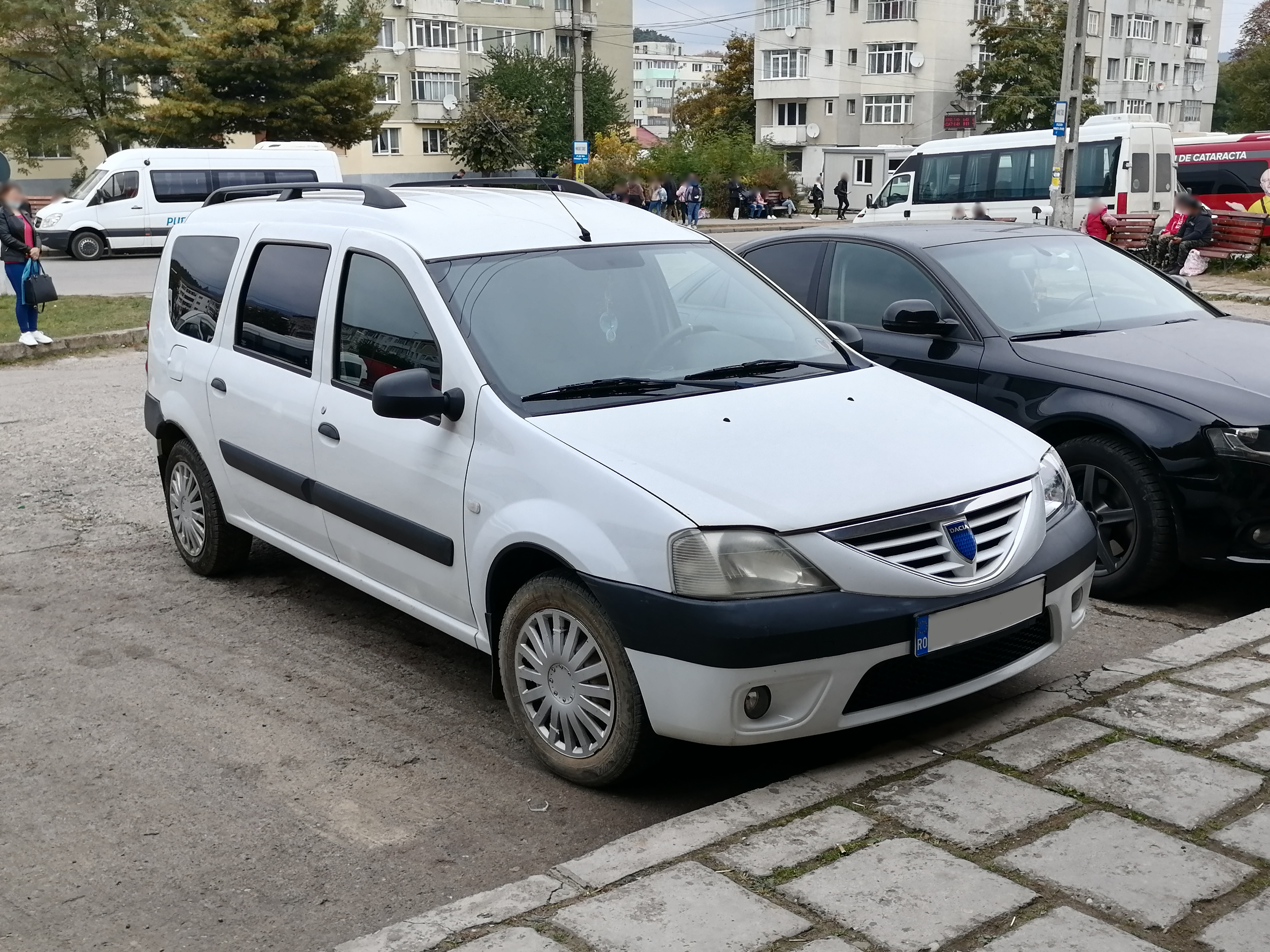
Dacia Logan MCV

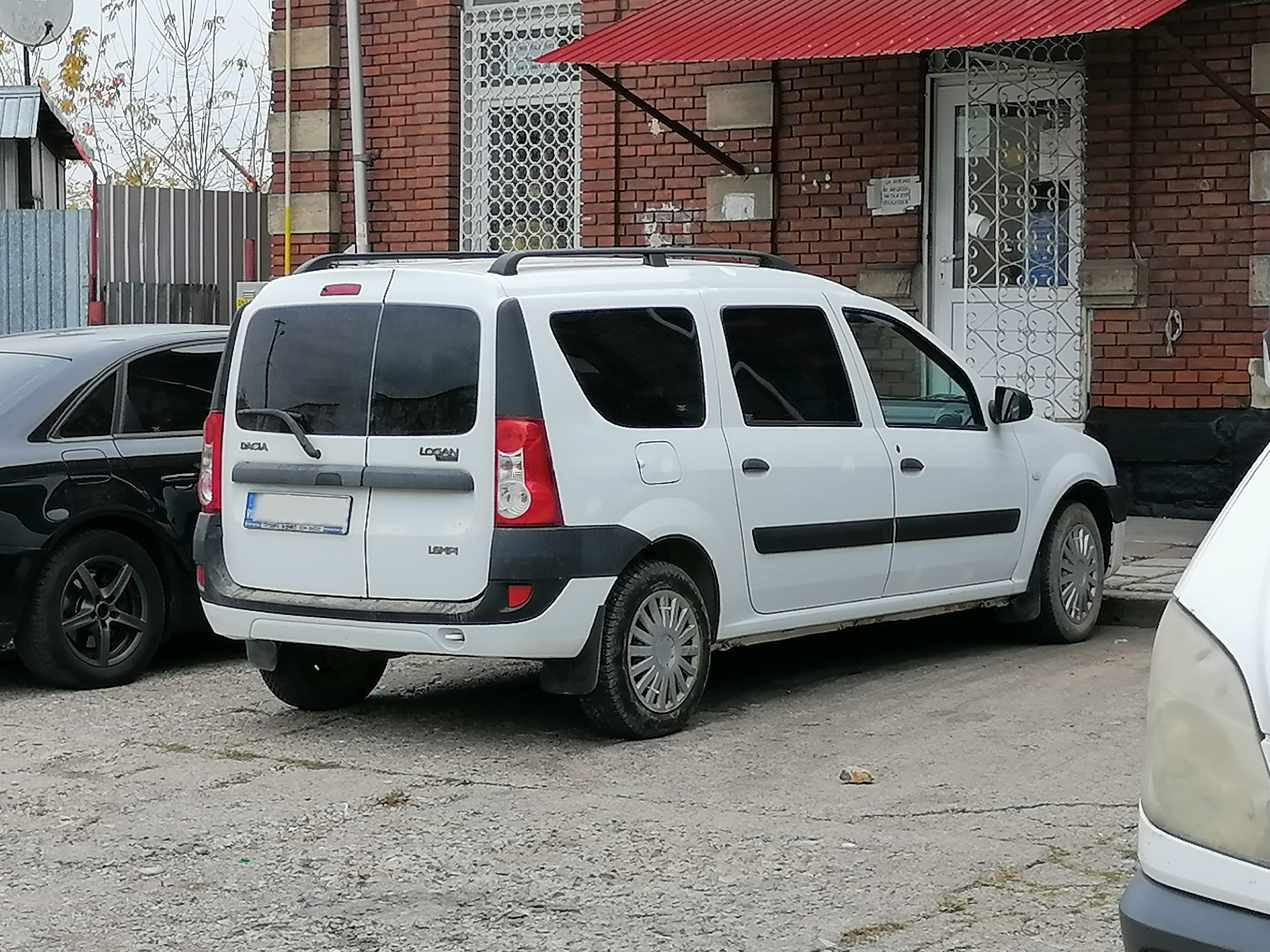
Dacia Logan MCV

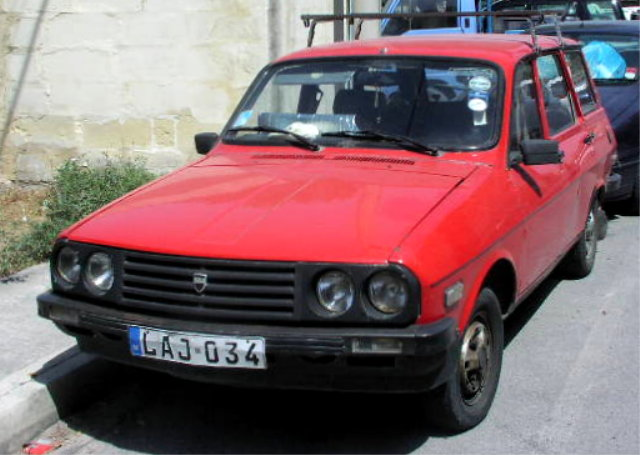
Dacia 1310

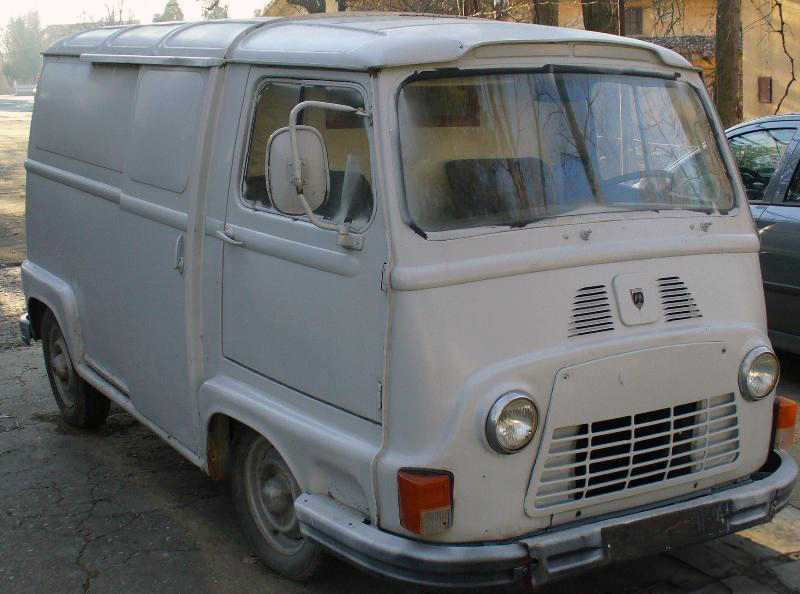
Dacia D6

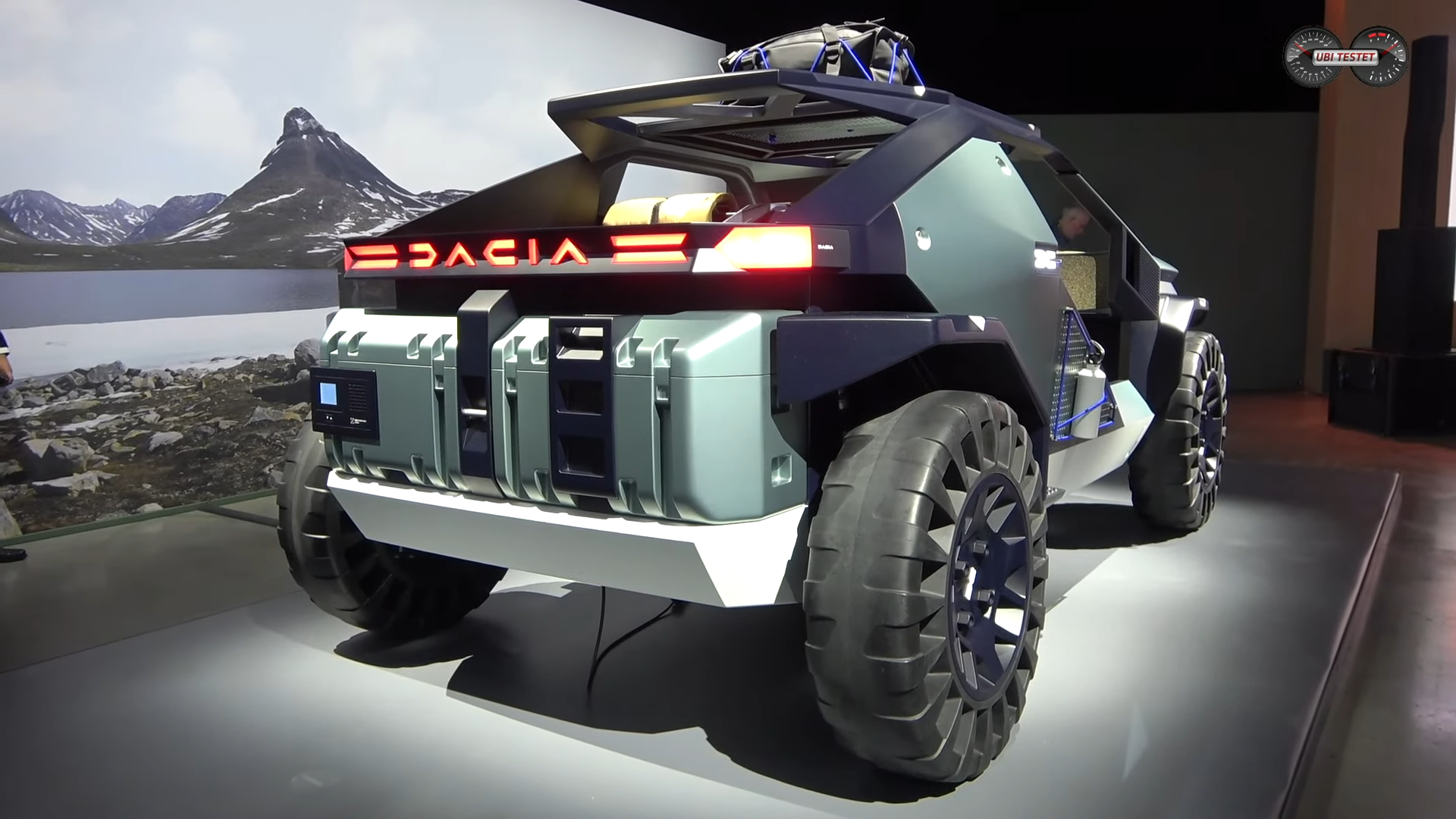
Dacia Manifesto

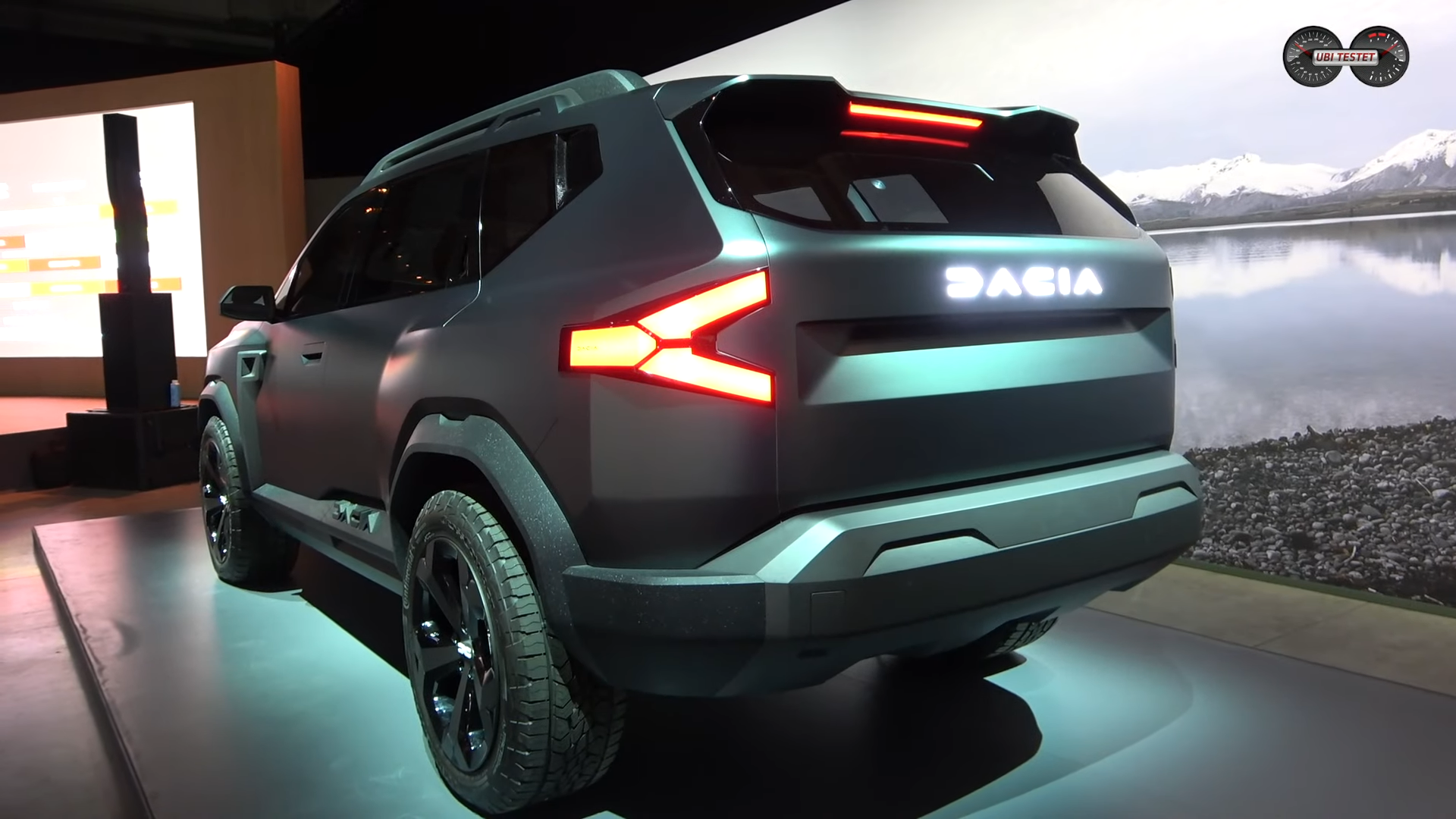
Dacia Bigster
