= Dacia Spring =

Battery electric city car

- First generation Dacia Spring

Overview
- Manufacturer: Dacia (Renault)
- Production: 2021–present

Body and chassis
- Class: Crossover city car (A) (2021–2026); City car (A) (2027–present)
- Body style: 5-door hatchback
- Layout: Front-motor, front-wheel-drive

The Dacia Spring is a battery electric city car marketed by the Romanian manufacturer Dacia, a marque of Renault. It is first production electric vehicle, along with their smallest model, position below the Dacia Sandero. It is marketed as a budget car and is among the cheapest new models in Europe.

== First generation (BW; 2021) ==
First generation
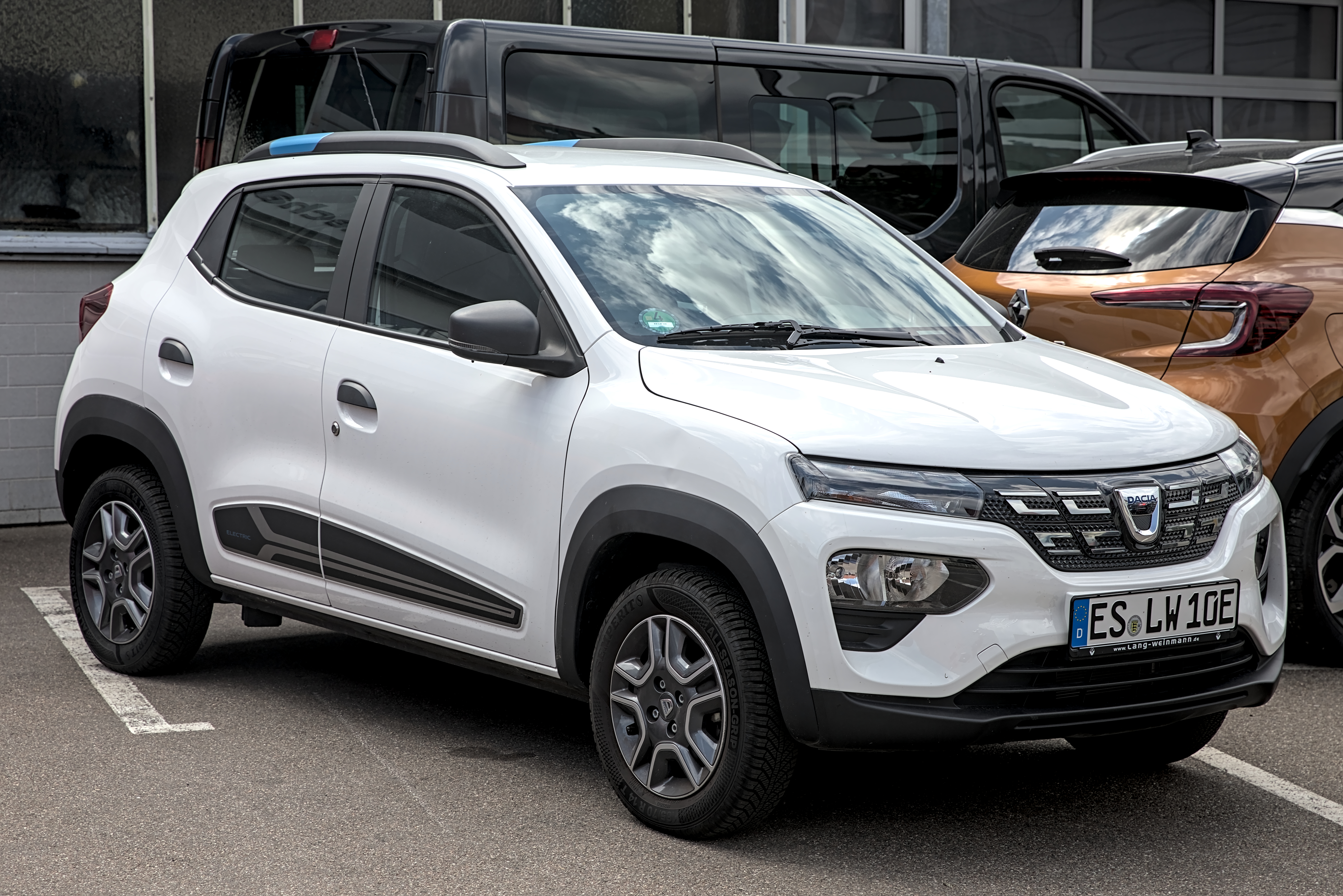
- Dacia Spring (pre-facelift)

Overview
- Model code: BW
- Also called: Renault Kwid
- Production: 2021–present
- Assembly: China: Shiyan (eGT New Energy Automotive)

Body and chassis
- Layout: Front-motor, front-wheel-drive

Powertrain
- Electric motor: Permanent magnet synchronous
- Power output: 33 kW (45 hp)
- Transmission: Single-speed automatic
- Battery: 27.4 kWh li-ion

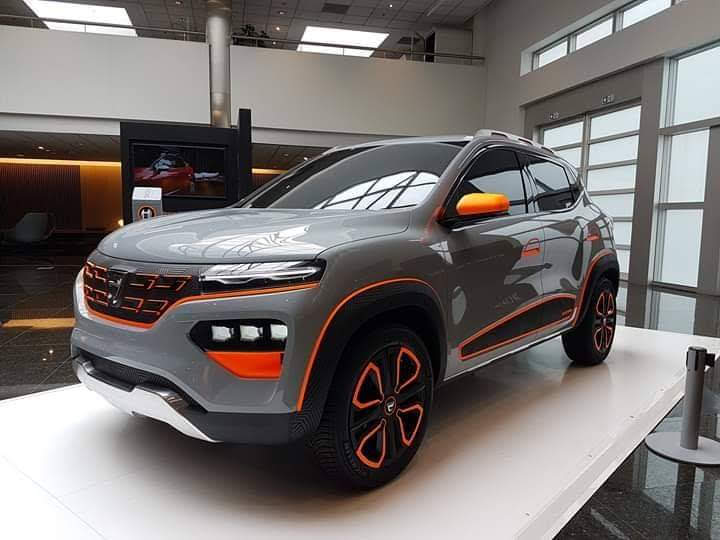
Dacia Spring Concept

In October 2019, the Gilles Normand, head of the EV department in Renault, indicated that a version of City K-ZE to be exported to the European market was in the works, under the internal code BBG. On 3 March 2020, the Romanian car manufacturer Dacia—Renault's budget-car subsidiary in Europe—unveiled a concept car of K-ZE for that market, under the name of Dacia Spring. It was intended to be presented at the 2020 Geneva Motor Show. However, once the entire show was cancelled due to COVID-19 pandemic, it was presented via web live stream. The concept had a grey body colour enhanced with neon orange accents on the rims, the door handles, the mirrors and the grille.

The production model of Spring was presented at Renault EWAYS conference on 15 October 2020. To meet European safety standards, Spring Electric has been reengineered, featuring a reinforced chassis, six airbags and other assistance systems. There were also changes in powertrain, with the single electric motor now being powered by a 27.4 kWh lithium-ion battery, instead of the 26.8 kWh in the Chinese model; permitting a claimed range of 230 km (140 mi) on the combined WLTP cycle.

Their sales began in March 2021. At its introduction, it was the cheapest electric car in Europe. The Spring Electric was also the second most popular model of electric car imported from China in the first eight months of 2021—only behind Tesla Model 3—with a total of 17,398 units sold in that period. Car-sharing services and cargo utility versions were also launched later in 2021. The deliveries for companies started in early 2021, while for private customers in autumn of 2021.

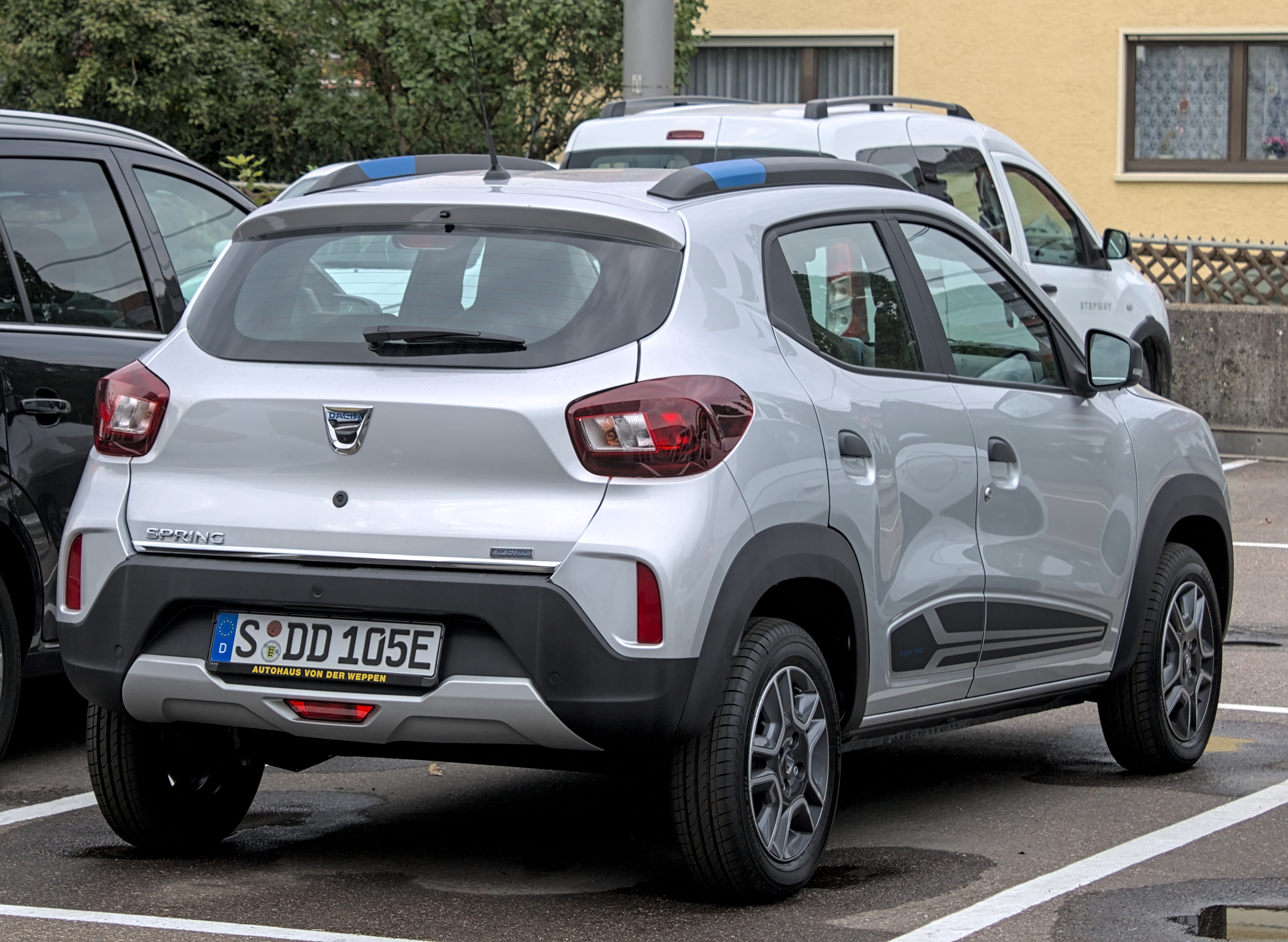
Rear view

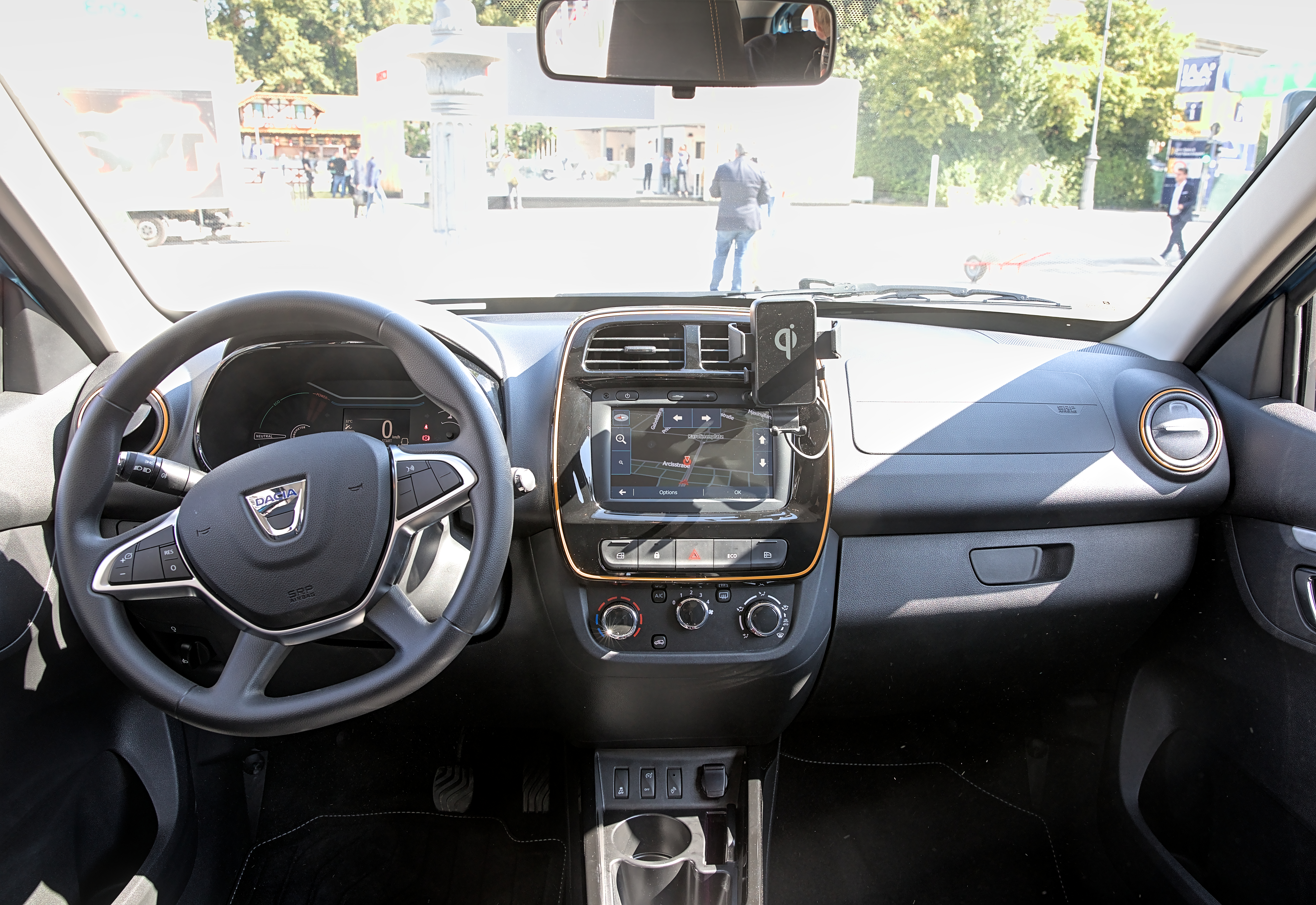
Interior

=== 2022 refresh ===
The 2023 Spring was launched in June 2022 alongside all the other Dacia models, had a slight facelift on the front grille and a new badge on the rear, featuring the new Dacia logo and branding. It has a 33 kW (45 hp) motor, 26.8kWh battery and weighs 970 kg (2,140 lb).

In January 2023, Dacia launched the Spring Extreme version which is equipped with a 48 kW (65 hp) motor and has a range of 220 km (140 mi).

In March 2023, Dacia updated the Cargo variant with the new logo, which is only available in certain European countries, such as Poland, the Czech Republic and Slovakia.

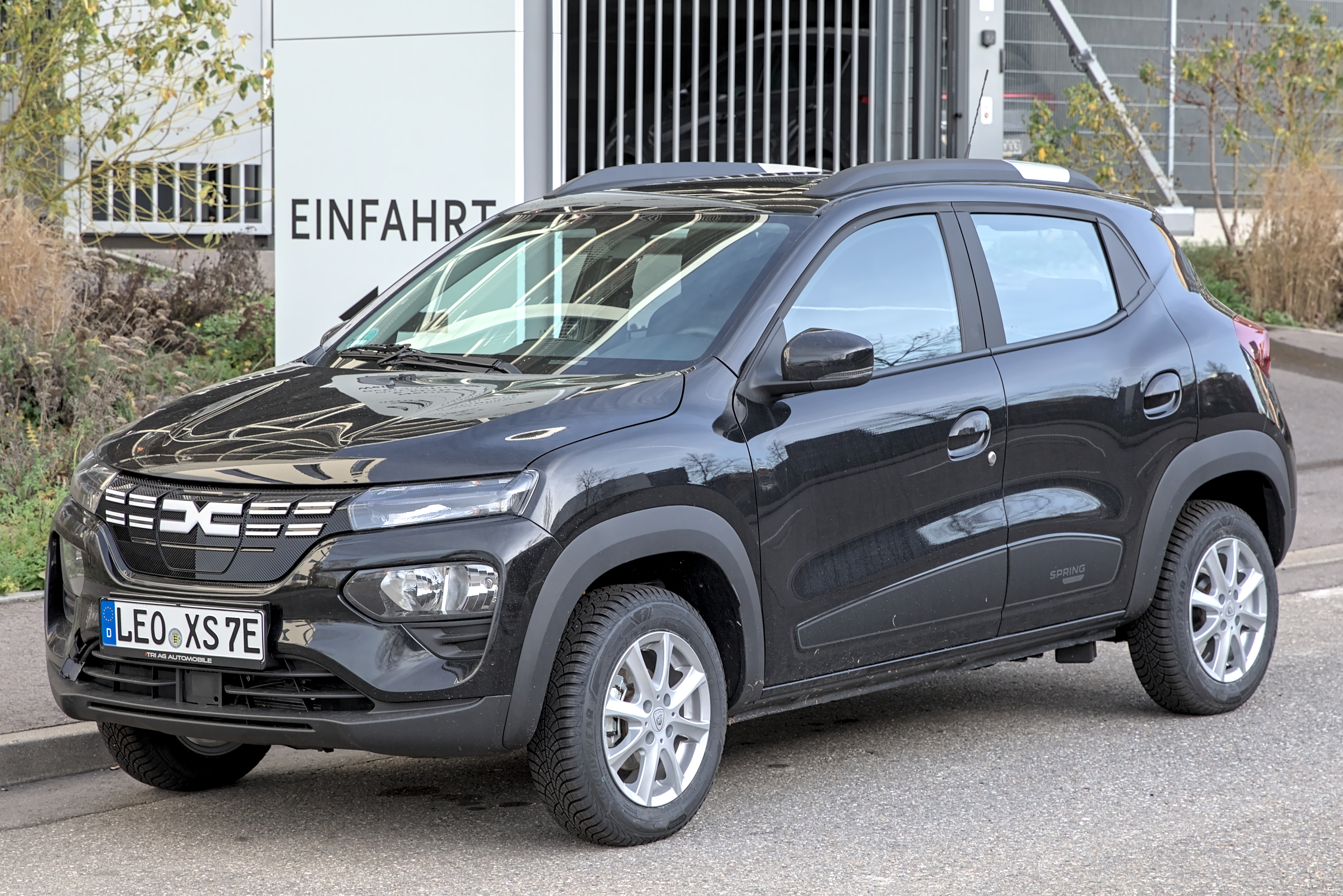
Dacia Spring (first facelift)

=== 2024 refresh ===
The refreshed Spring was unveiled on 21 February 2024, showcasing a revamped front and rear fascia designs, along with newly styled headlights and taillights. It is now produced in a right-hand drive format for UK and Irish markets.

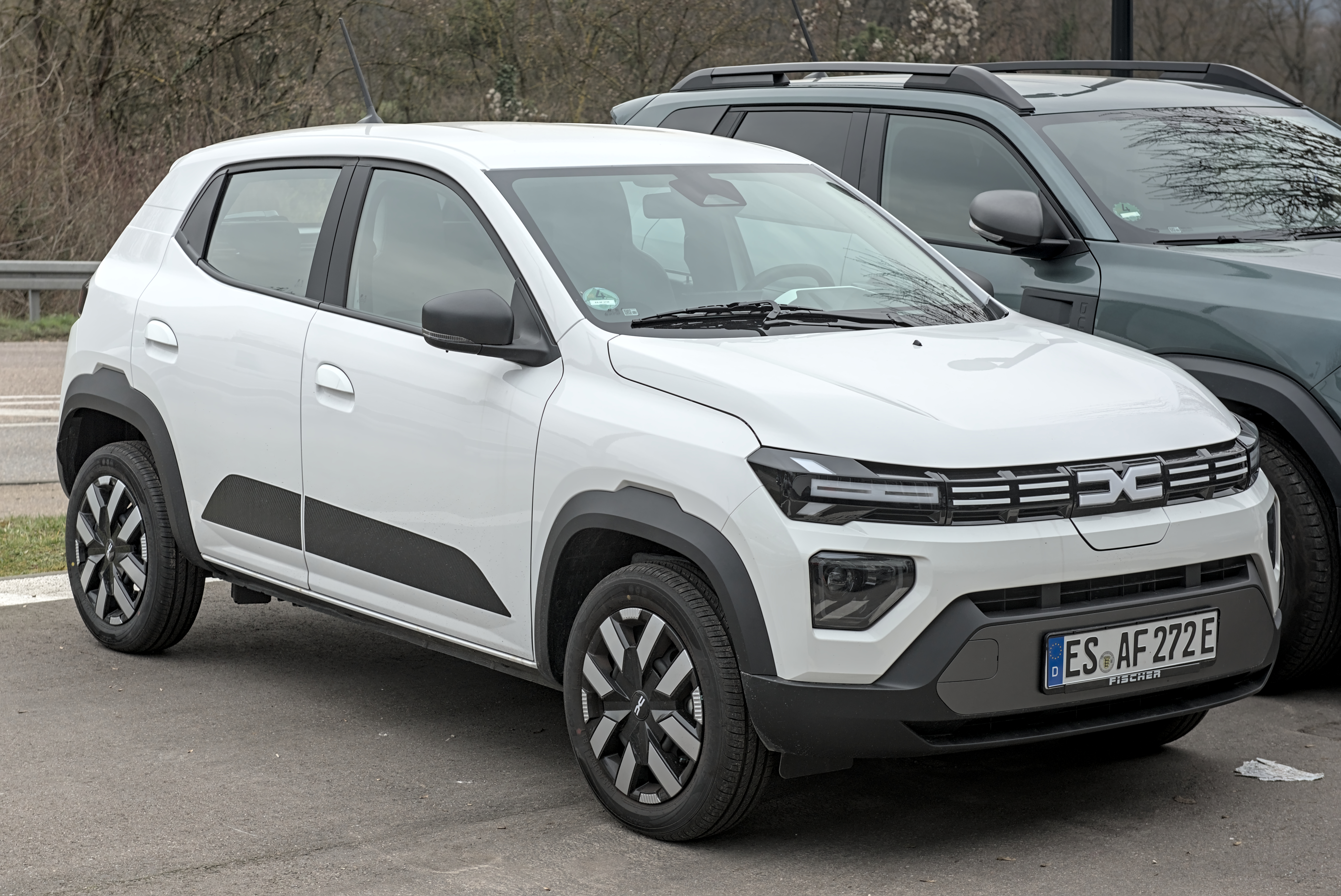
Dacia Spring (second facelift)

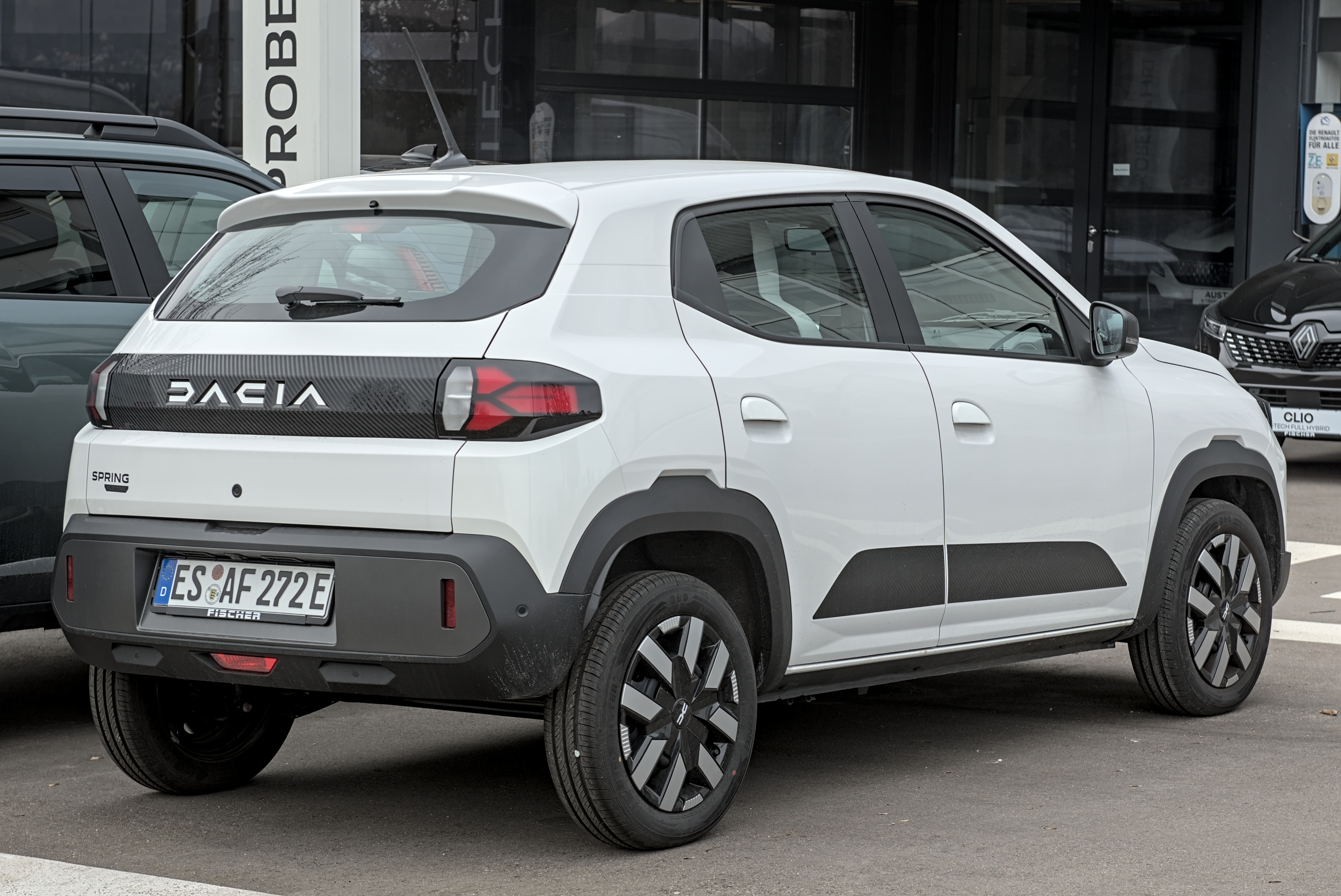
Rear view

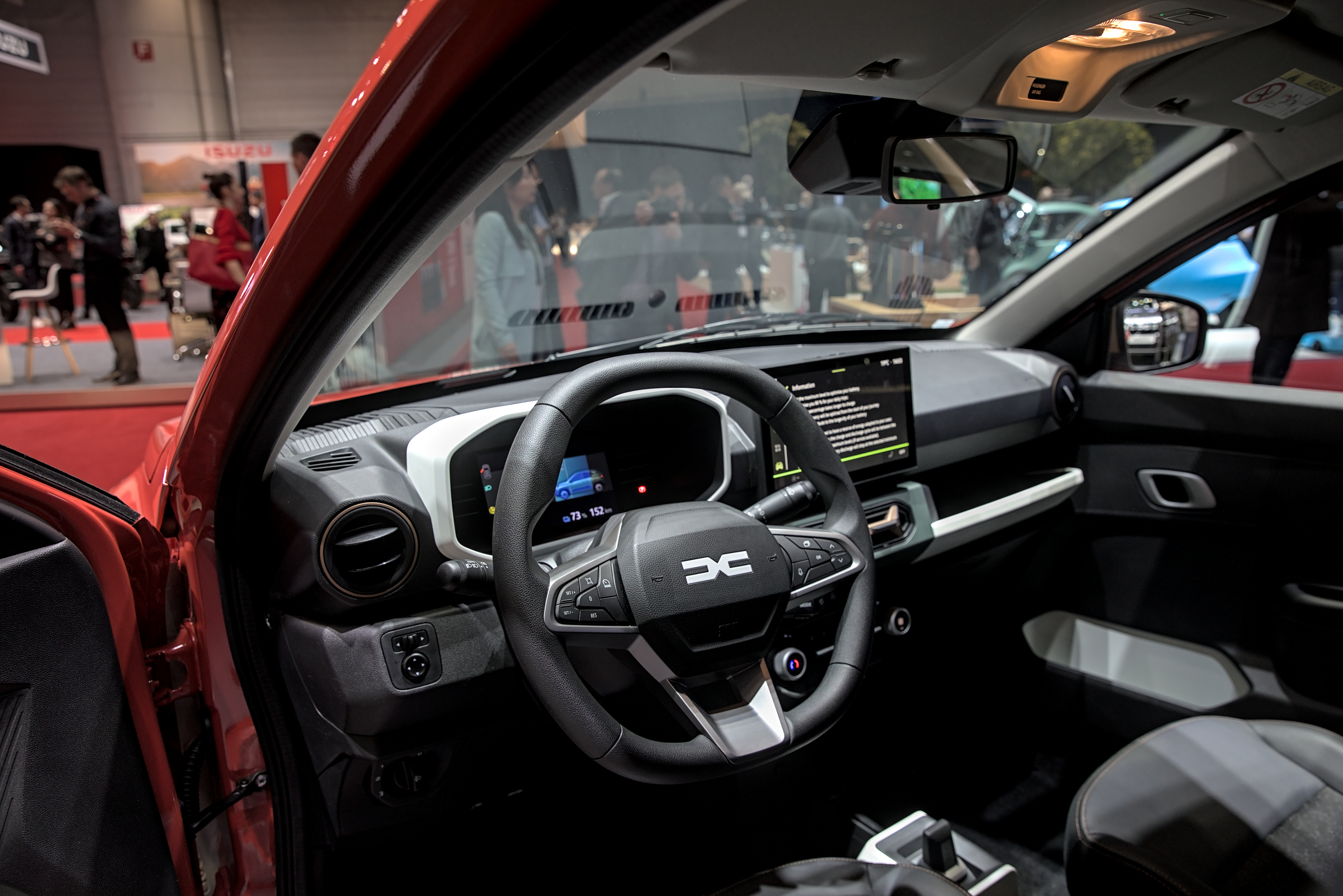
Interior

=== Safety ===
The Dacia Spring in its standard European market configuration was awarded a one star rating in the Euro NCAP crash test published in December 2021. Euro NCAP said the testing highlighted "a high risk of life-threatening injuries for driver chest and rear passenger head in frontal crash tests and marginal chest protection in side impact." The protocol still in use by Latin NCAP in 2022 (one level above that of 2017) is very similar to the 2014 Euro NCAP (four levels below that of 2021).

Euro NCAP test results Dacia Spring (2021)
Test	Points	%
Overall:	1 /5 stars	
Adult occupant:	18.9	49%
Child occupant:	27.5	56%
Pedestrian:	21.3	39%
Safety assist:	5.2	32%

== Second generation (BBG; 2027) ==
Second generation
- Second generation Dacia Spring

Overview
- Model code: BBG
- Production: 2027 (to commence)
- Assembly: Slovenia: Novo Mesto, (Renault Slovenia)

Body and chassis
- Platform: AmpR Small / RGEV Small
- Related: Renault Twingo E-Tech; Nissan Pixo EV

Powertrain
- Electric motor: Permanent magnet synchronous
- Power output: 33 kW (45 hp)
- Transmission: Single-speed automatic
- Battery: 27.4 kWh li-ion

The second-generation Spring, based on the Renault Twingo E-Tech, was unveiled in September 2026. The Chinese-made Dacia Hipster entry-level EV was originally going to use the Spring nameplate.

Rear view

Interior
