= Renault Twingo E-Tech =

Battery electric city car

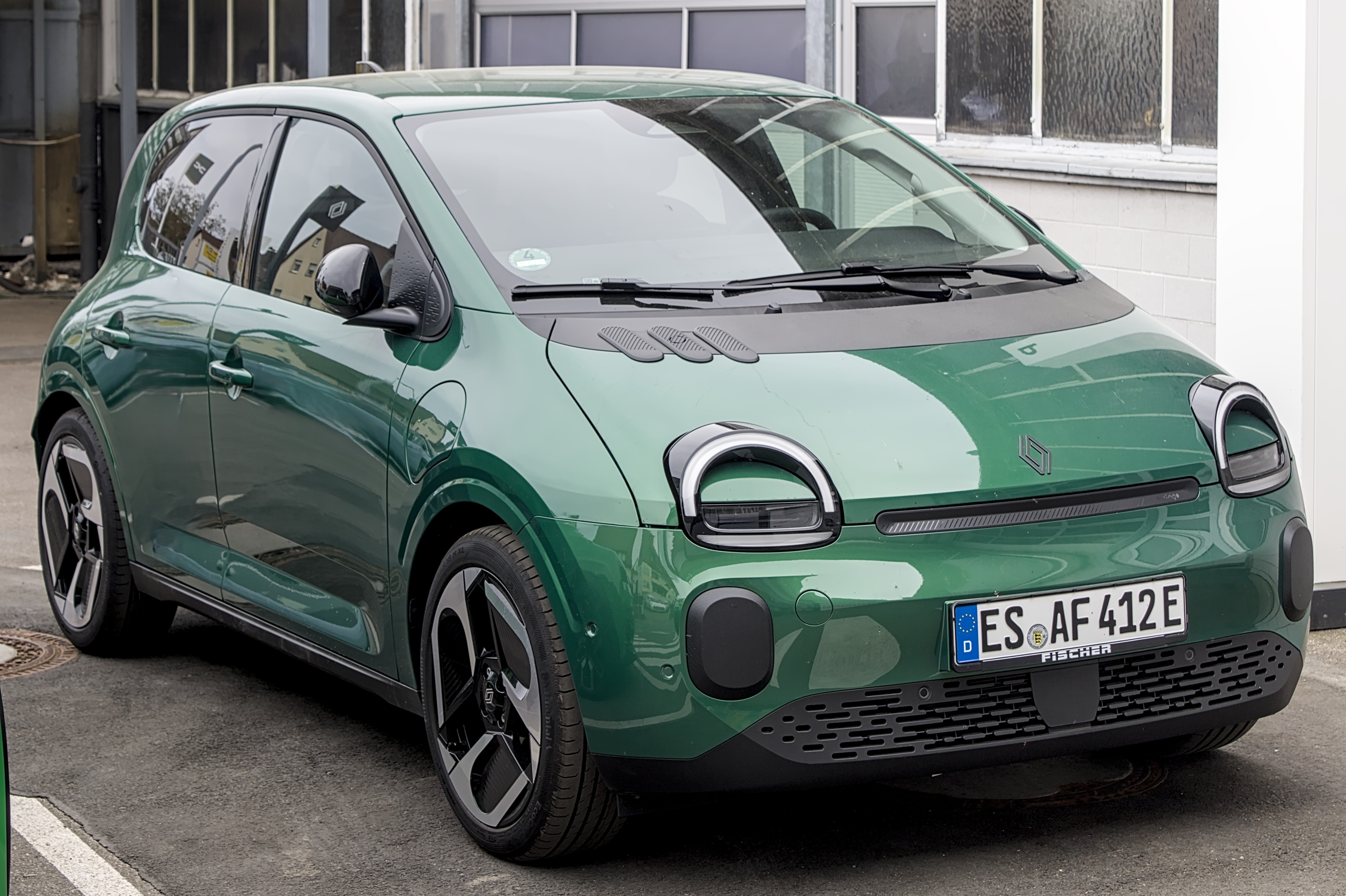

Overview
- Manufacturer: Renault
- Also called: Nissan Pixo EV
- Production: 2026–present
- Assembly: Slovenia: Novo Mesto (Renault Slovenia)
- Designer: Gilles Vidal (design director)

Body and chassis
- Class: City car (A)
- Body style: 5-door hatchback
- Layout: Front-motor, front-wheel-drive
- Platform: AmpR Small / RGEV Small
- Related: Dacia Spring (second generation)

Powertrain
- Electric motor: 60 kW (80 hp; 82 PS)
- Transmission: Single-speed automatic
- Battery: 27.5 kWh LFP
- Range: 263 km (163 mi) (WLTP)
- Plug-in charging: 6.6 kW AC (standard); 11 kW AC / 50 kW DC (optional Advanced Charge pack)

Dimensions
- Wheelbase: 2,493 mm (98.1 in)
- Length: 3,789 mm (149.2 in)
- Width: 1,720 mm (67.7 in)
- Height: 1,491 mm (58.7 in)
- Kerb weight: 1,200 kg (2,646 lb)

Chronology
- Predecessor: Renault Twingo; Nissan Pixo; Renault Zoe

The Renault Twingo E-Tech is a battery electric city car produced by the French manufacturer Renault since 2026. It is the fourth generation of the Twingo and sold as a battery electric vehicle, similar to the Twingo E-Tech Électrique, which was built from 2021 to 2024.

Its design is heavily inspired by the styling of the first-generation Twingo. Renault has positioned the car as an affordable battery electric A-segment vehicle with a starting price below €20,000.

Starting in late 2026, the fourth-generation Twingo has a Dacia-badged counterpart, the second-generation Dacia Spring, as well as a Nissan-badged model, the second-generation Nissan Pixo.

== History ==
Renault Twingo Legend Concept

The Twingo E-Tech was previewed in November 2023 by the Twingo Legend concept car. The Twingo Legend is a three-door like the first-generation model.

== Overview ==
The Twingo E-Tech was officially unveiled on 6 November 2025 on the Champs-Élysées in Paris. It is built on the AmpR Small platform (later renamed to RGEV Small), sharing a front axle with the Renault 5 and Renault 4 E-Tech models, while its rear axle is instead derived from the Renault Captur. Assembly began in Slovenia in 2026, at the Renault Slovenia plant in Novo Mesto that previously built the second- and third-generation Twingo.

In France, priority ordering opened to holders of Renault's "R Pass" scheme on 16 December 2025, before order books opened to the general public on 8 January 2026; deliveries began shortly afterwards. In August 2026, right-hand-drive examples had reached UK retailers for display ahead of order books opening later in the year.

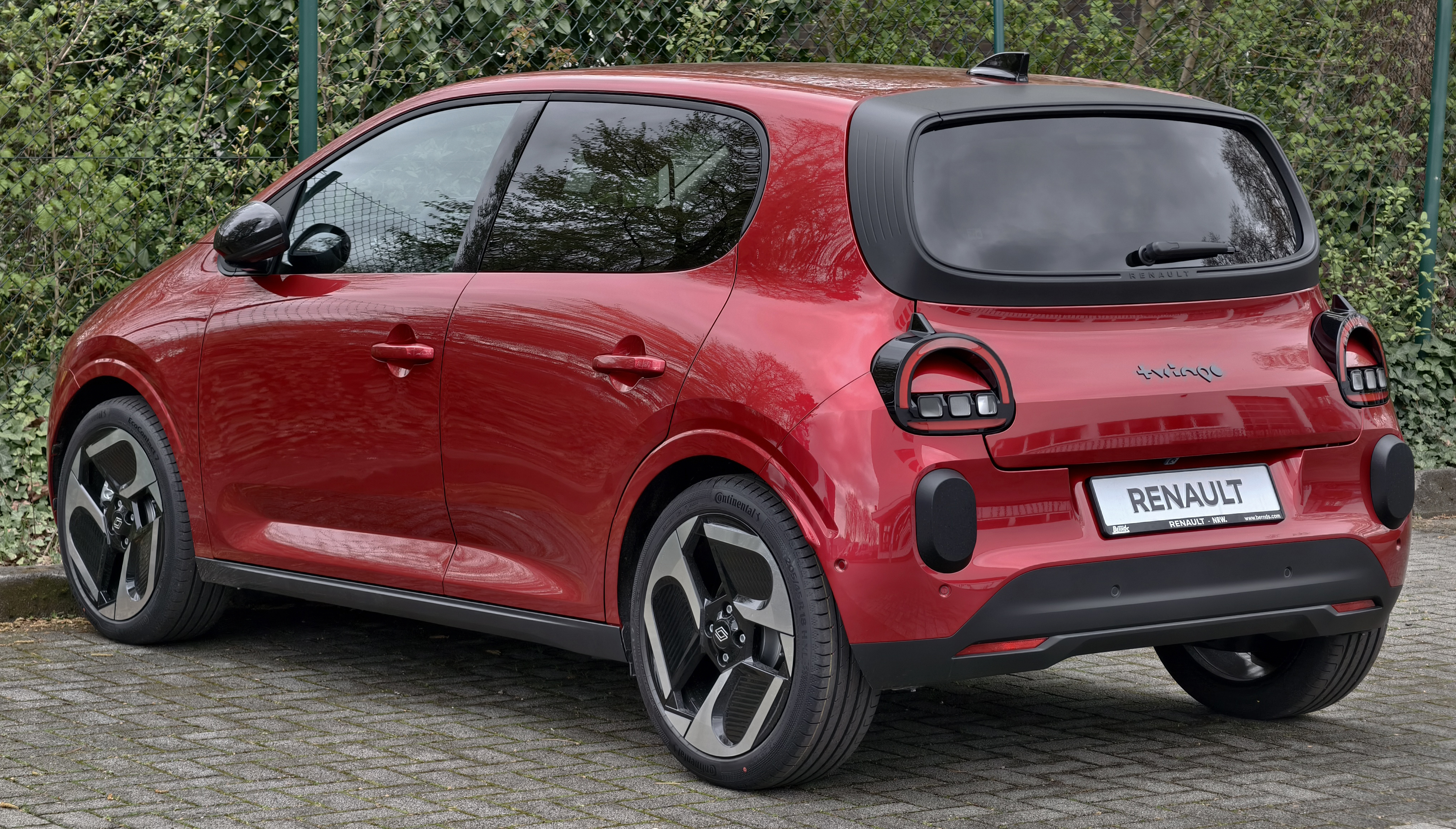
Rear view

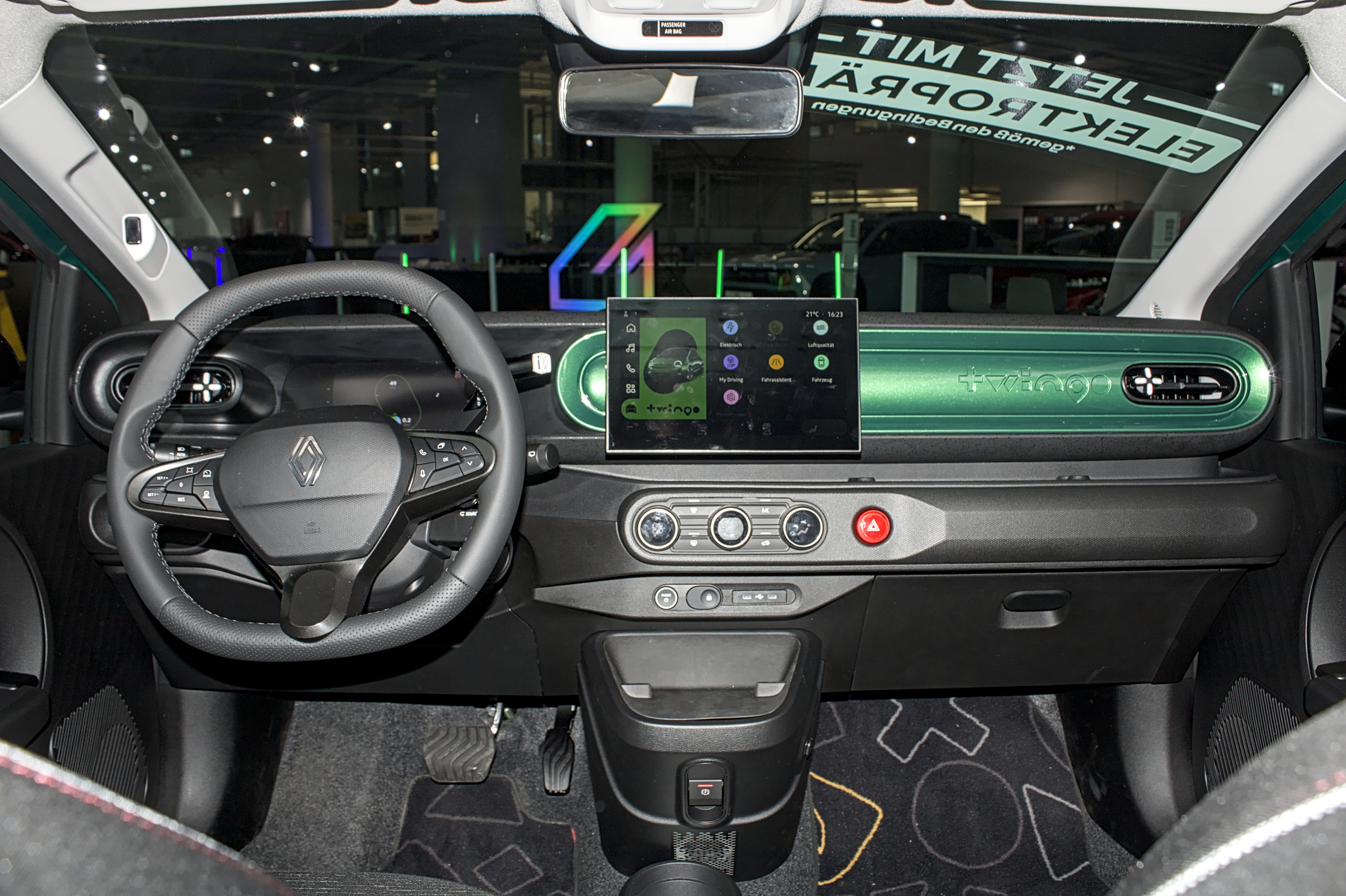
Interior

=== Design and equipment ===
The Twingo E-Tech styling, including its rounded headlights, single-box silhouette, and half-moon tail lights, is intended to evoke the original 1993 Twingo, while a black lower body cladding and roofline give it a more "contemporary" appearance. However it has a five-door body style, unlike the first two generations of the model.

The car is sold in a choice of four exterior colours, including a Mango Yellow launch colour, and offers a modular interior with two individually sliding rear seats and a folding front passenger seat.

Standard equipment includes a 7-inch digital instrument cluster paired with a 10-inch touchscreen running Renault's OpenR Link infotainment system with Google built in. Higher-specification cars add a suite of driver-assistance systems and a one-pedal driving mode. The infotainment system includes Reno, a voice-activated virtual assistant built into the dashboard display.

== Nissan Pixo EV ==
The second-generation Nissan Pixo is a rebadged variant of the Twingo E-Tech by Japanese marque Nissan, revealed on September 23, 2026. Exterior changes include redesigned front and rear fascias featuring pixelated lights inspired by video games from the 1980s, with the headlights resembling the shape of Nissan's typical V-motion grille, a more defined hood, and different color options. For the interior, the dashboard has been redesigned, while the seats and door panels receive different colors and materials.

Nissan Pixo EV

Rear view

== Powertrain ==
The Twingo E-Tech uses a single front-mounted electric motor producing 60 kW (80 hp; 82 PS) and 175 N⋅m (129 lb⋅ft) of torque, giving a 0–100 km/h (0–62 mph) time of 12.1 seconds and a top speed of 130 km/h (81 mph). Energy is stored in a 27.5 kWh lithium iron phosphate (LFP) battery pack, giving a WLTP range of up to 263 km (163 mi). A 6.6 kW onboard AC charger is standard, while an optional "Advanced Charge" pack adds an 11 kW bidirectional AC charger and 50 kW DC fast-charging capability; the LFP pack does not use a heat pump for thermal management.

== Awards ==
In January 2024, the Twingo E-Tech Electric Prototype won the special jury prize at the 31st L'Argus Trophies ceremony. Following its launch, the production model was named Electric Car of the Year at the TopGear.com EV Awards 2026 and won Best Small Car at the 2026 Autocar Awards.
