= Industrija Motornih Vozil =

Slovenian vehicle manufacturer owned by Renault

IMV logo

Industrija Motornih Vozil (IMV; lit. 'Motor Vehicle Industry') was an automobile manufacturer based in Novo Mesto, Slovenia. It initially assembled vans and cars for German marque DKW, then developed and manufactured its own vans, and went on to assemble Austin and Renault cars. In 1988 it formed a formal joint venture with Renault to form Revoz, now wholly owned by Renault since 2004.

== History ==
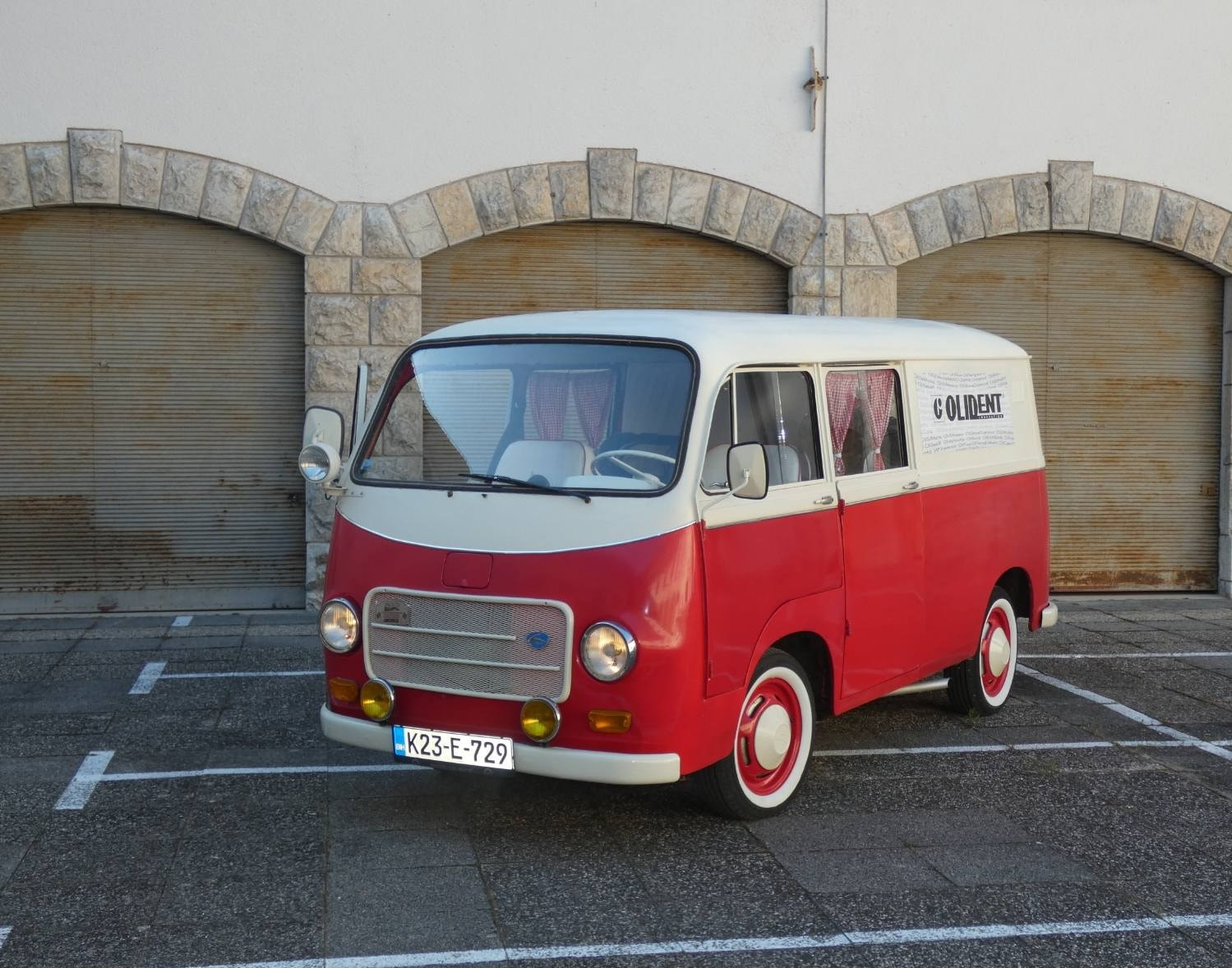
IMV 1600R

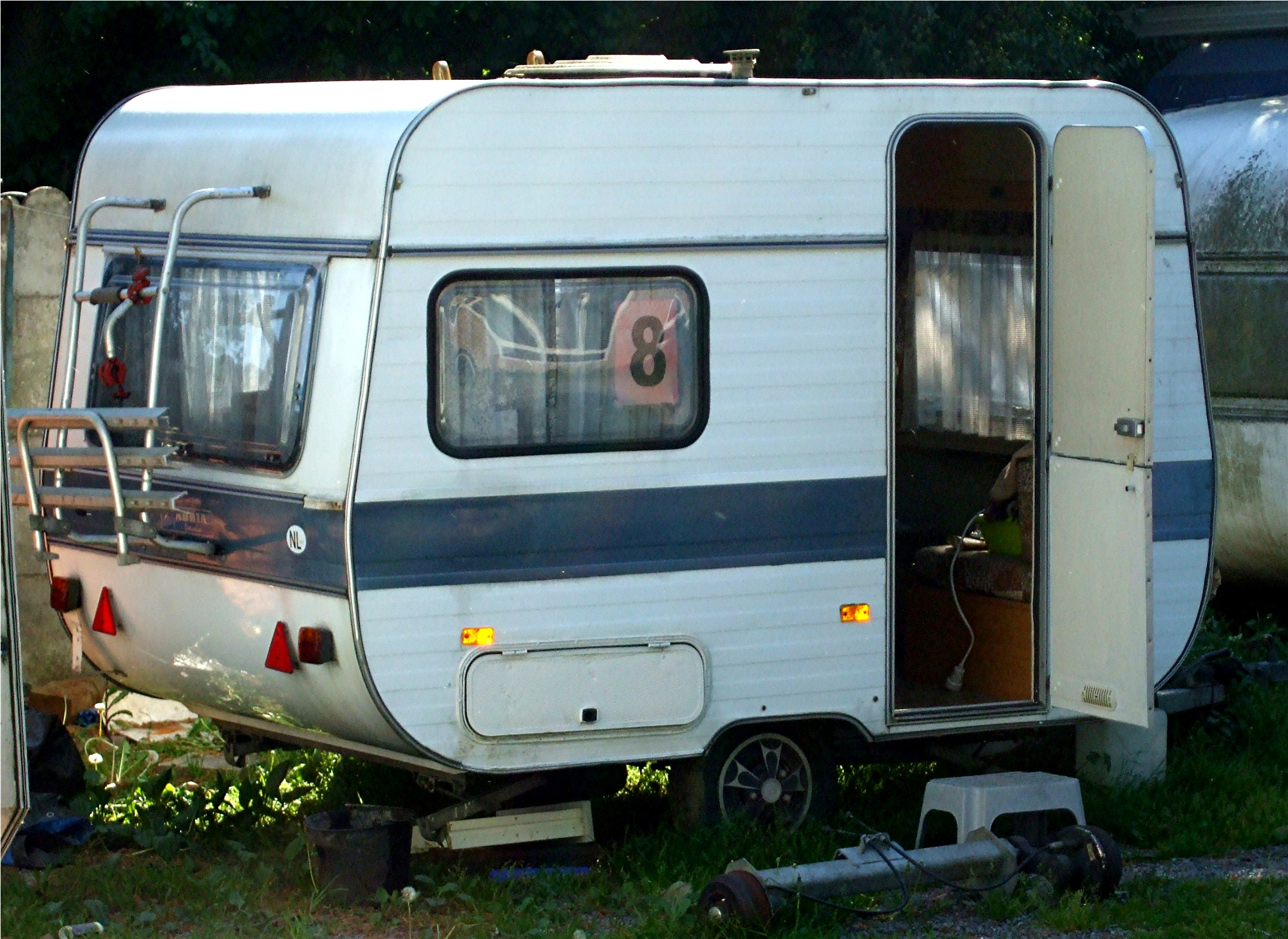
IMV Adria

The company was established in 1954 in former Yugoslavia to sell and then assemble DKW Schnellaster vans under the name Moto Montana. It became IMV in 1959, and began assembly of DKW cars in 1962.

IMV began building its own van, following the sales success of DKW vans. Initially the IMV van retained DKW engines, and became a versatile commercial vehicle throughout Yugoslavia in van, minibus and pickup forms. Following the demise of DKW, IMV used British Motor Corporation 1600 engines.

Building on the engine link with BMC, IMV started to assembled cars by license from Austin between 1967 and 1972. These included the Austin 1300, the Mini 1000, and the Austin Maxi 1500/1750.

Following supply issues of parts for the Austin vehicles, IMV signed an agreement in 1972 with Renault and began assembling the Renault 4. In 1989, Renault took complete ownership of the IMV car manufacturing division under the name Revoz.

IMV also produced Adria caravans from 1965, and later developed a motor home division in the early 1980s. This was spun out as a separate business entity in 1995 under the name Adria Mobil, after Renault increased its share in IMV and the Revoz factory.

== Products ==
The IMV van was built in two sizes, the regular two-axle model and a longer version with a dual rear axle. A small number were exported to Austria as the Donau 1000.

- IMV 1000, powered by DKW's two-stroke 981cc engine, producing 39 bhp (29 kW; 40 PS)
- IMV 1600, powered by a BMC 1622cc engine, producing 56 bhp (42 kW; 57 PS)
- IMV 2200D, launched in 1977 powered by a Mercedes-Benz 2197cc engine, producing 60 bhp (45 kW; 61 PS)
