= A-segment =

Car size classification in Europe

2024 best-selling

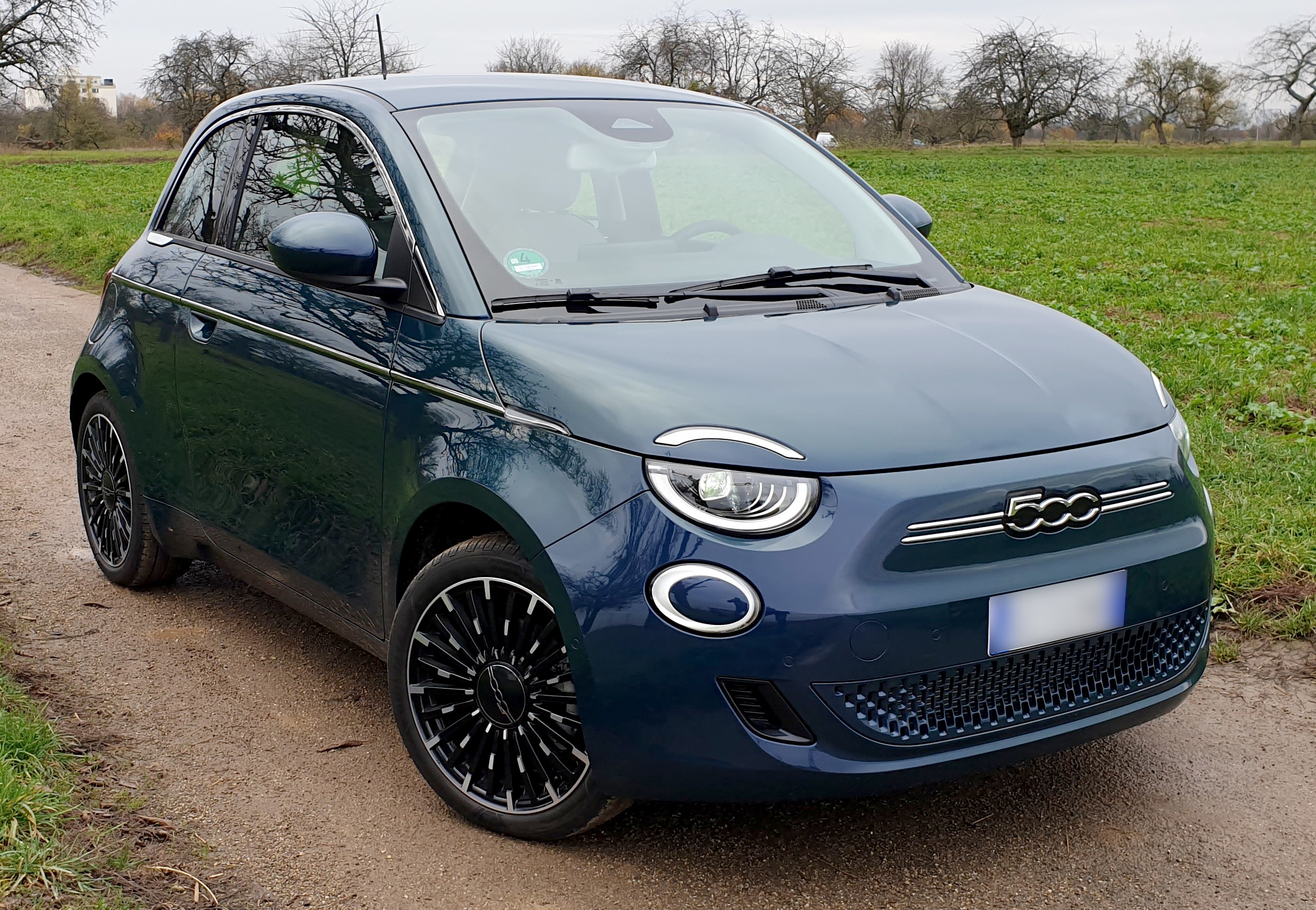
Fiat 500e (2020–present)

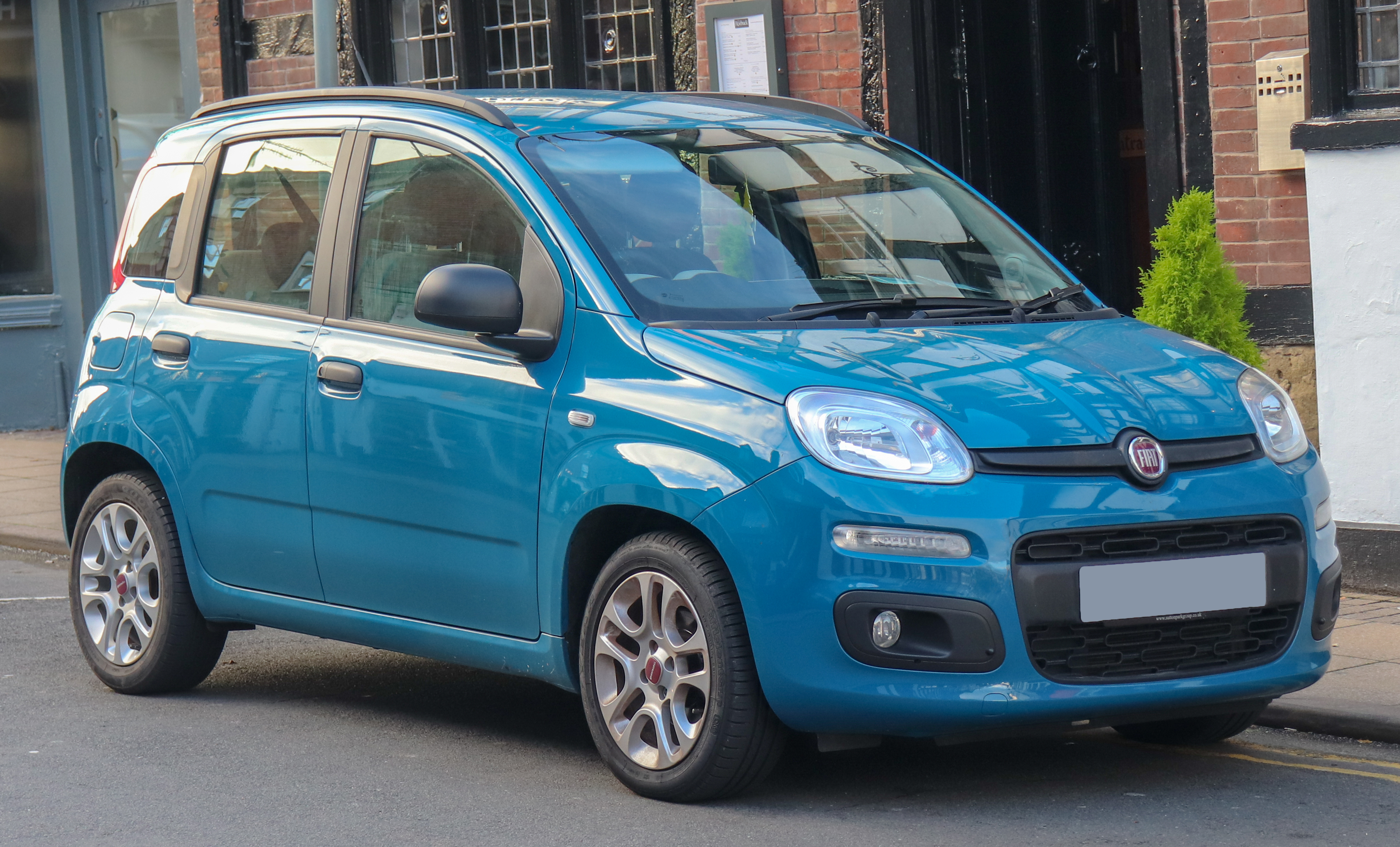
Fiat Panda 3rd generation (2011–present)

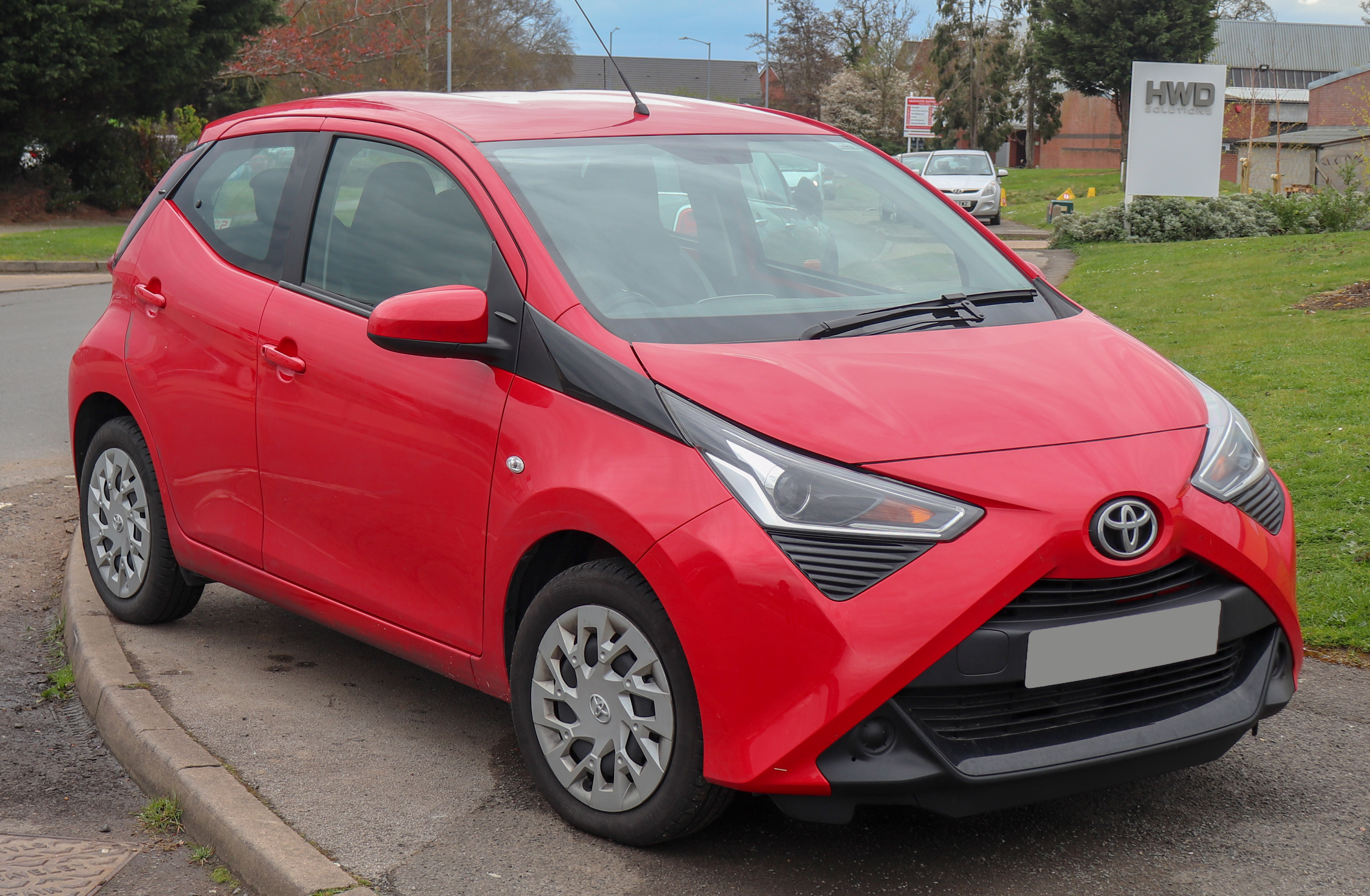
Toyota Aygo 2nd generation (2014–2021)

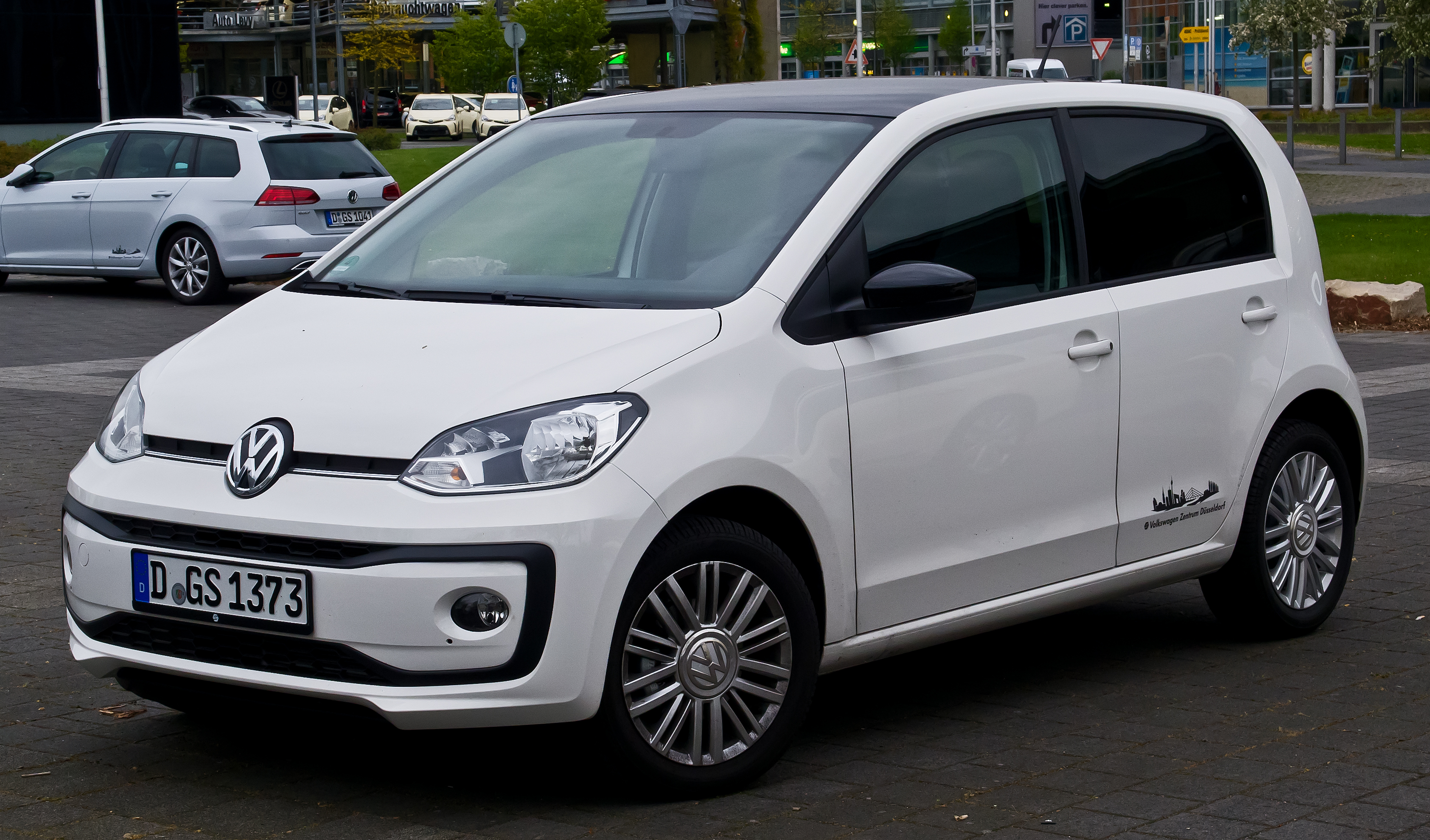
Volkswagen Up! 1st generation (2011–2023)

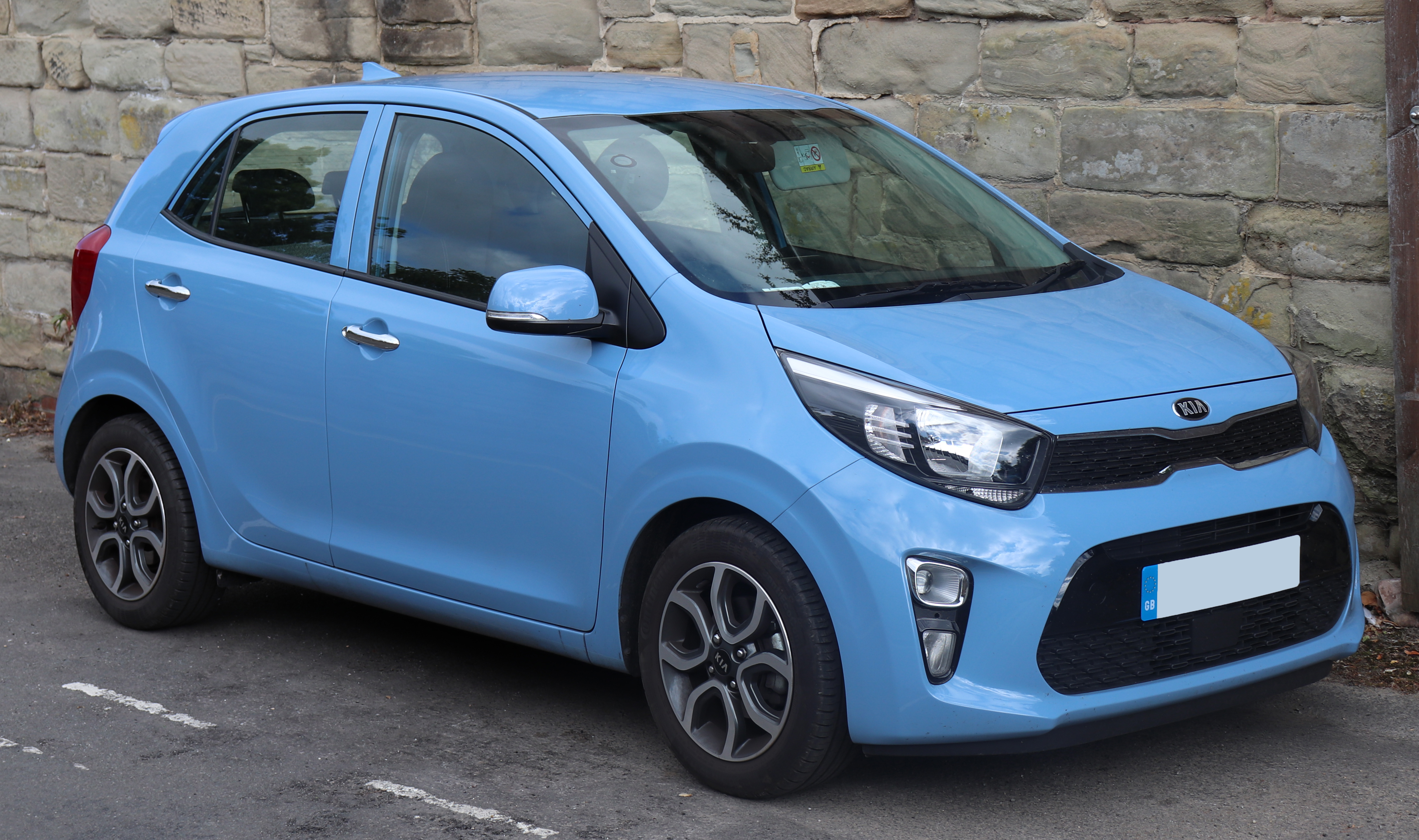
Kia Picanto 3rd generation (2017–present)

The A-segment is the first category in the passenger car classification system defined by the European Commission. It is used for city cars, the smallest category of passenger cars defined.

A-segment sales represented approximately 4.2% of the European market in 2024. It is approximately equivalent to the kei car class in Japan.

== Definition ==
As of 2021, the A-segment category size spans from approximately 2.7 metres (110 in) to 3.7 metres (150 in).

== Characteristics ==
Body styles for A-segment cars in Europe have historically nearly always been hatchbacks. But as crossovers gain popularity, new models have begun to shift to resemble crossovers. Examples of crossover city cars include Suzuki Ignis and Toyota Aygo X. Other body styles such as sedans have only a few models present in this segment because these shapes largely prove impractical at typical A-segment dimensions.

A-segment cars are traditionally offered with manual transmission as the sole transmission option. Beginning in the 2010s, automatic options are increasingly available. Some newer models most often utilize CVTs, while a small number of manufacturers also offer automated manual transmissions.

The engines of A-segment cars commonly range from 1.0 to 1.4 litres, either in inline-four or three configuration. Newer models may have turbocharged and/or hybrid engines with a particular emphasis on higher fuel efficiency.

== Current models ==
In 2020, the ten best-selling A-segment cars in Europe were the Fiat Panda, Fiat 500, Toyota Aygo, Renault Twingo, Volkswagen Up!, Hyundai i10, Kia Picanto, Peugeot 108, Citroën C1 and Suzuki Ignis.

100,000 - 200,000 sales

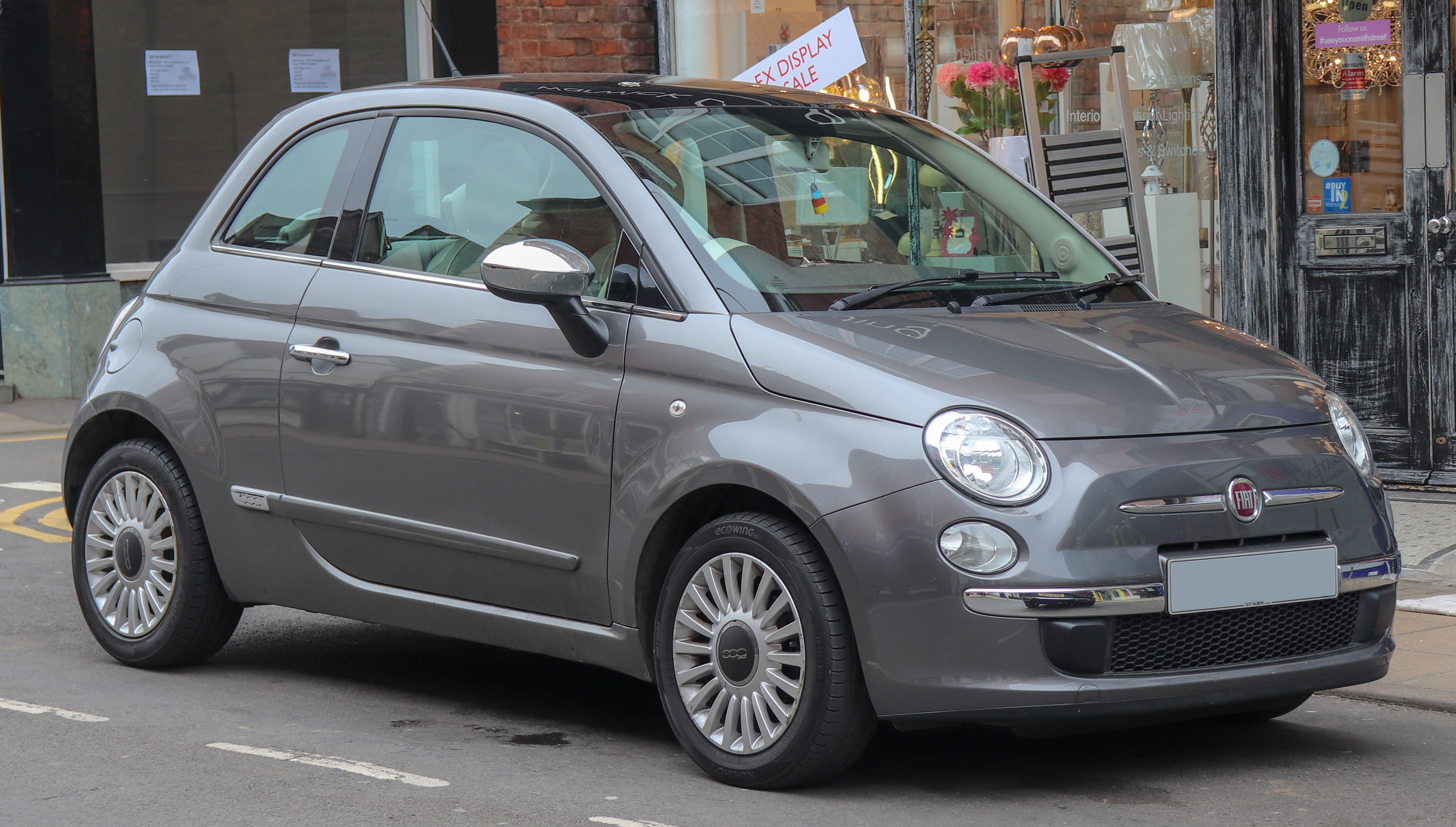
Fiat 500 (2007)
1st generation (2007–2024)
Made in Poland

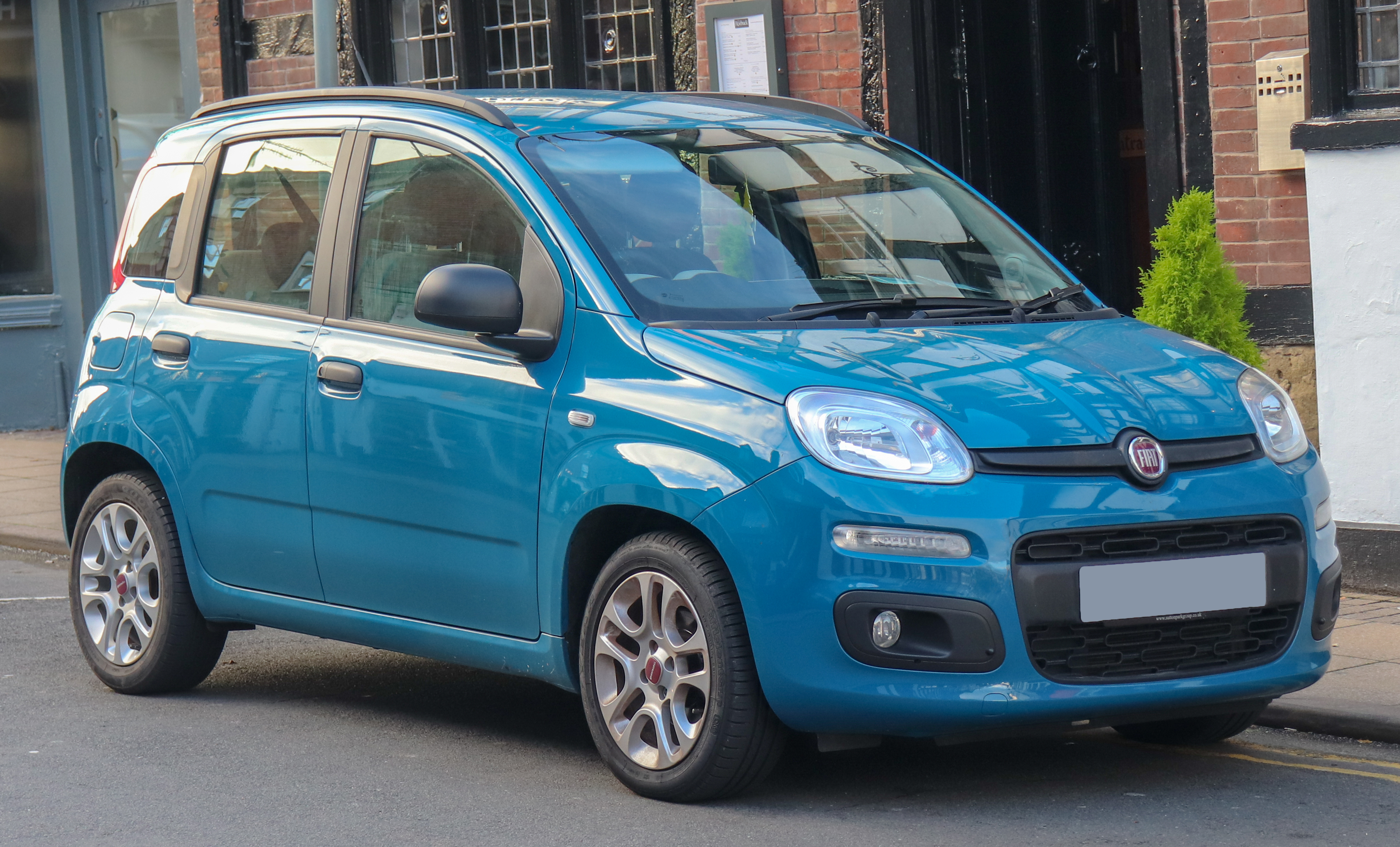
Fiat Panda
3rd generation (2011–present)
Made in Italy

50,000 - 100,000 sales

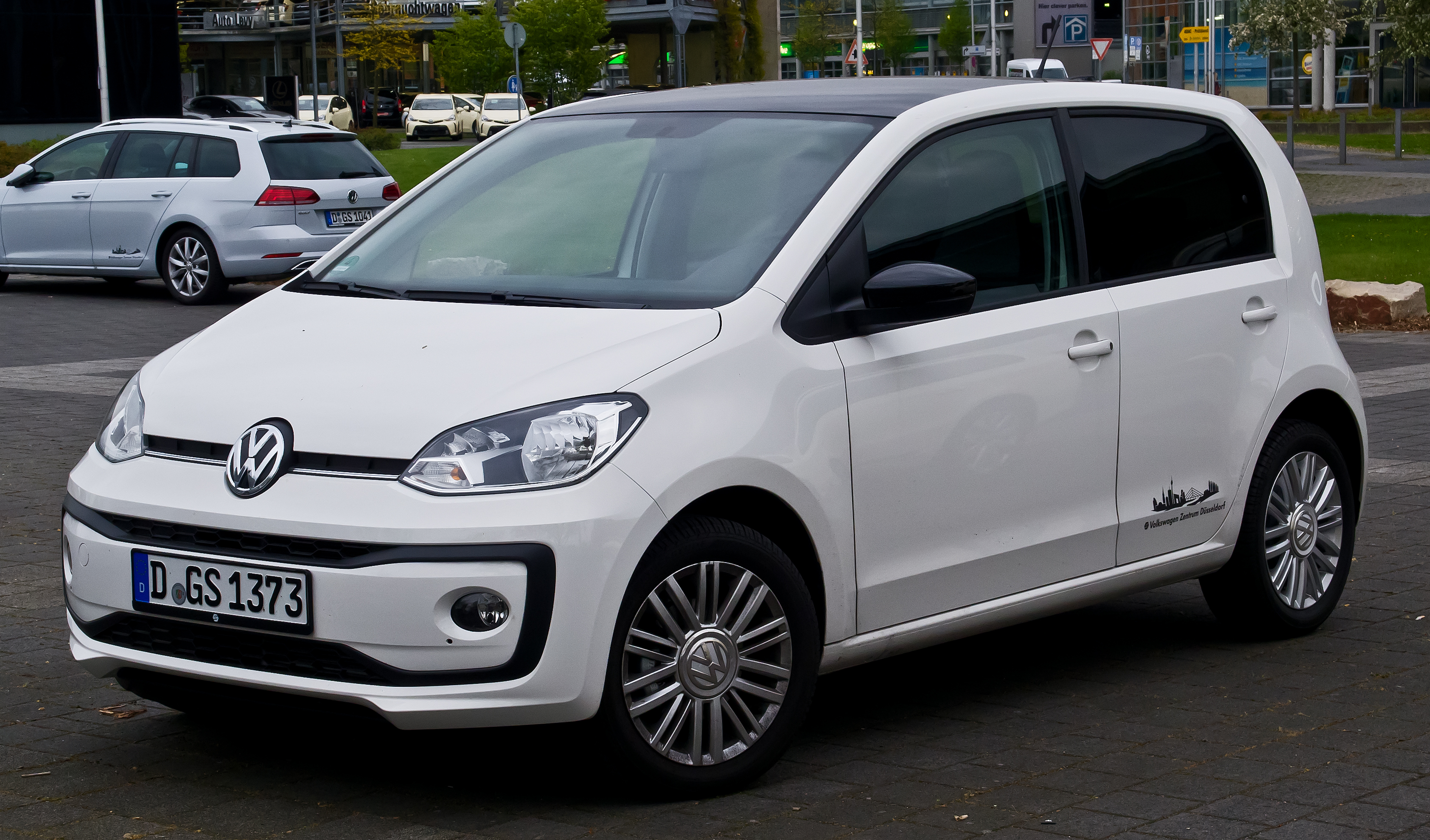
Volkswagen Up!
1st generation (2011–2023)
Made in Slovakia

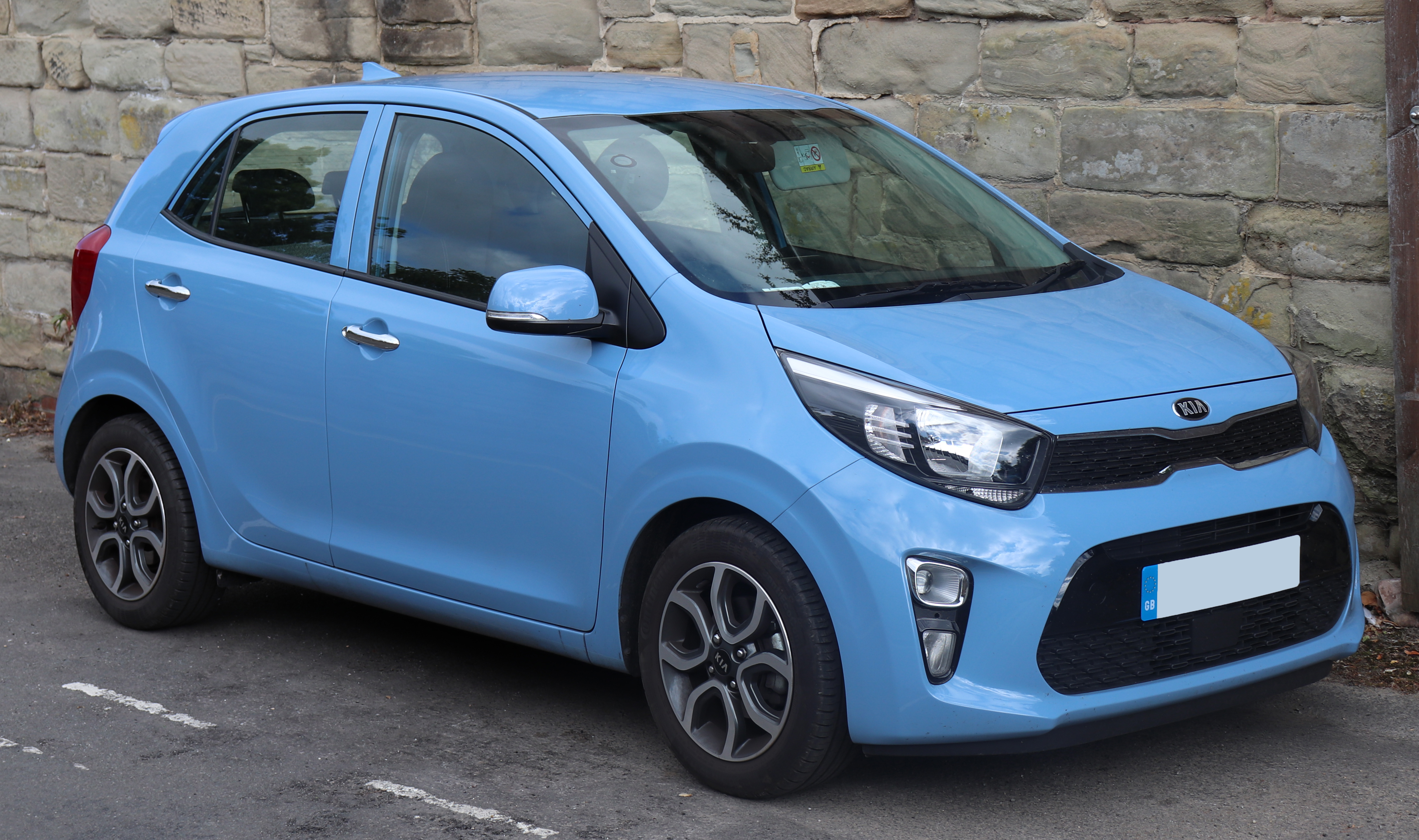
Kia Picanto
3rd generation (2017–present)
Made in South Korea

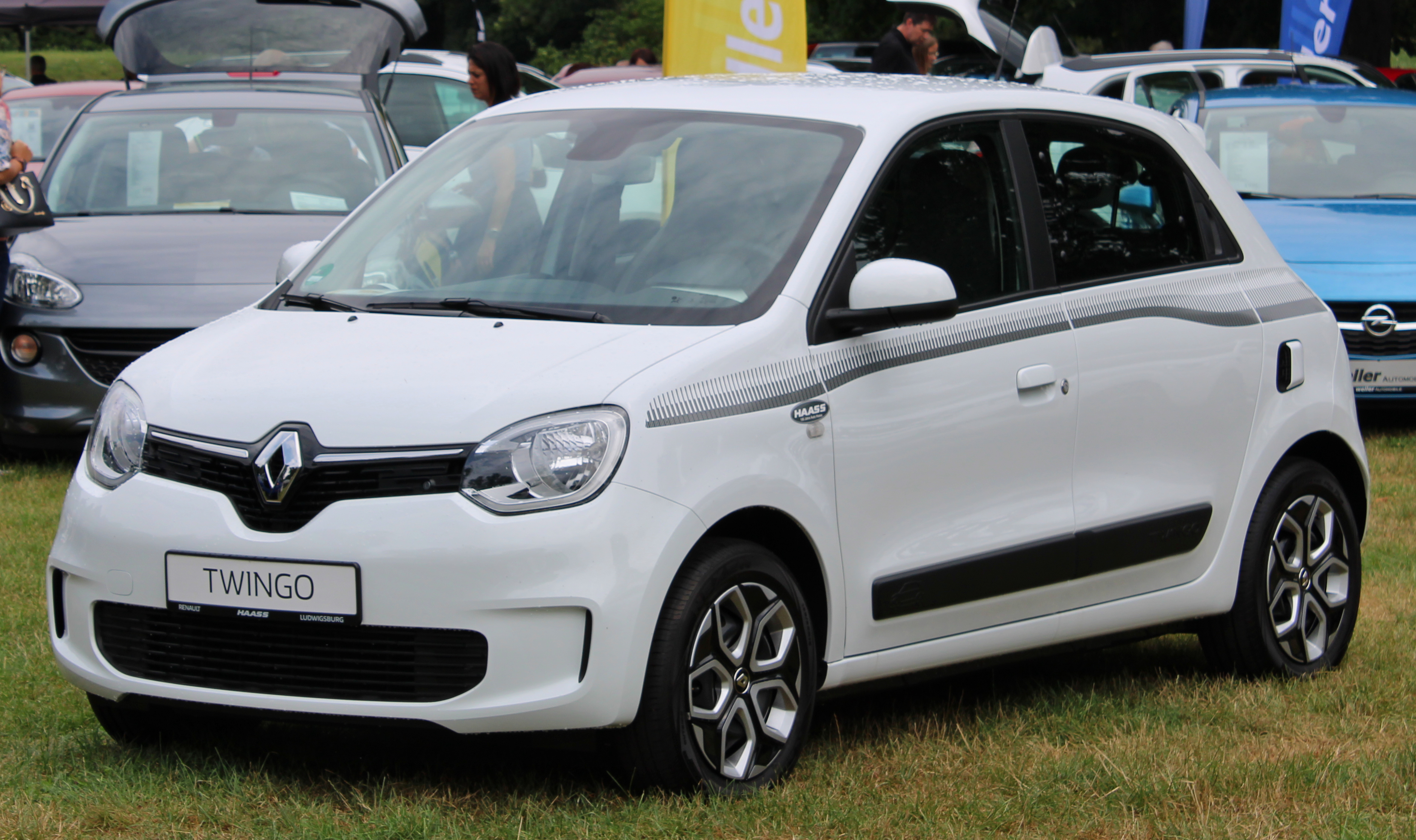
Renault Twingo
3rd generation (2014–2024)
Made in Slovenia

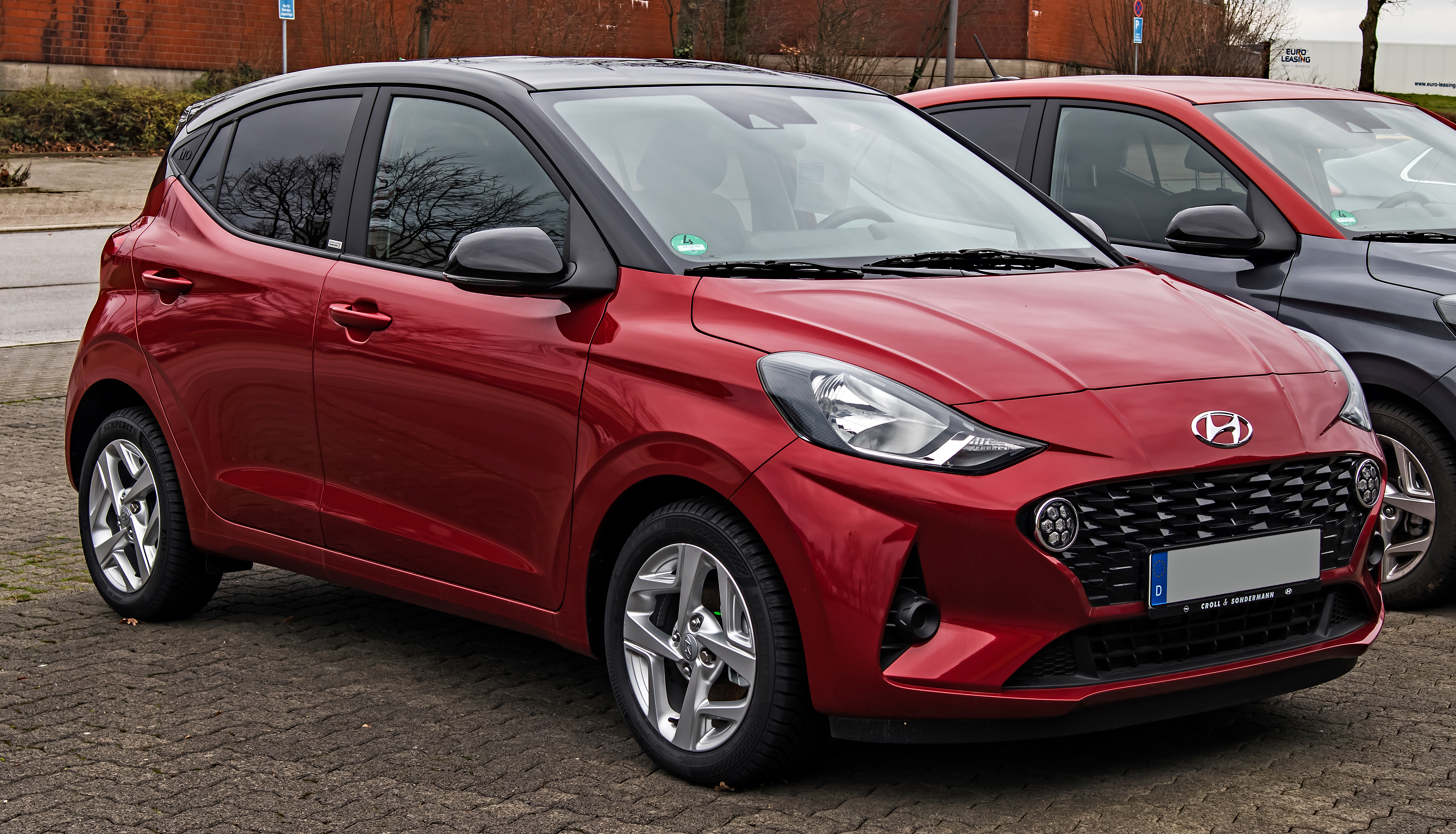
Hyundai i10
3rd generation (2019–present)
Made in Turkey

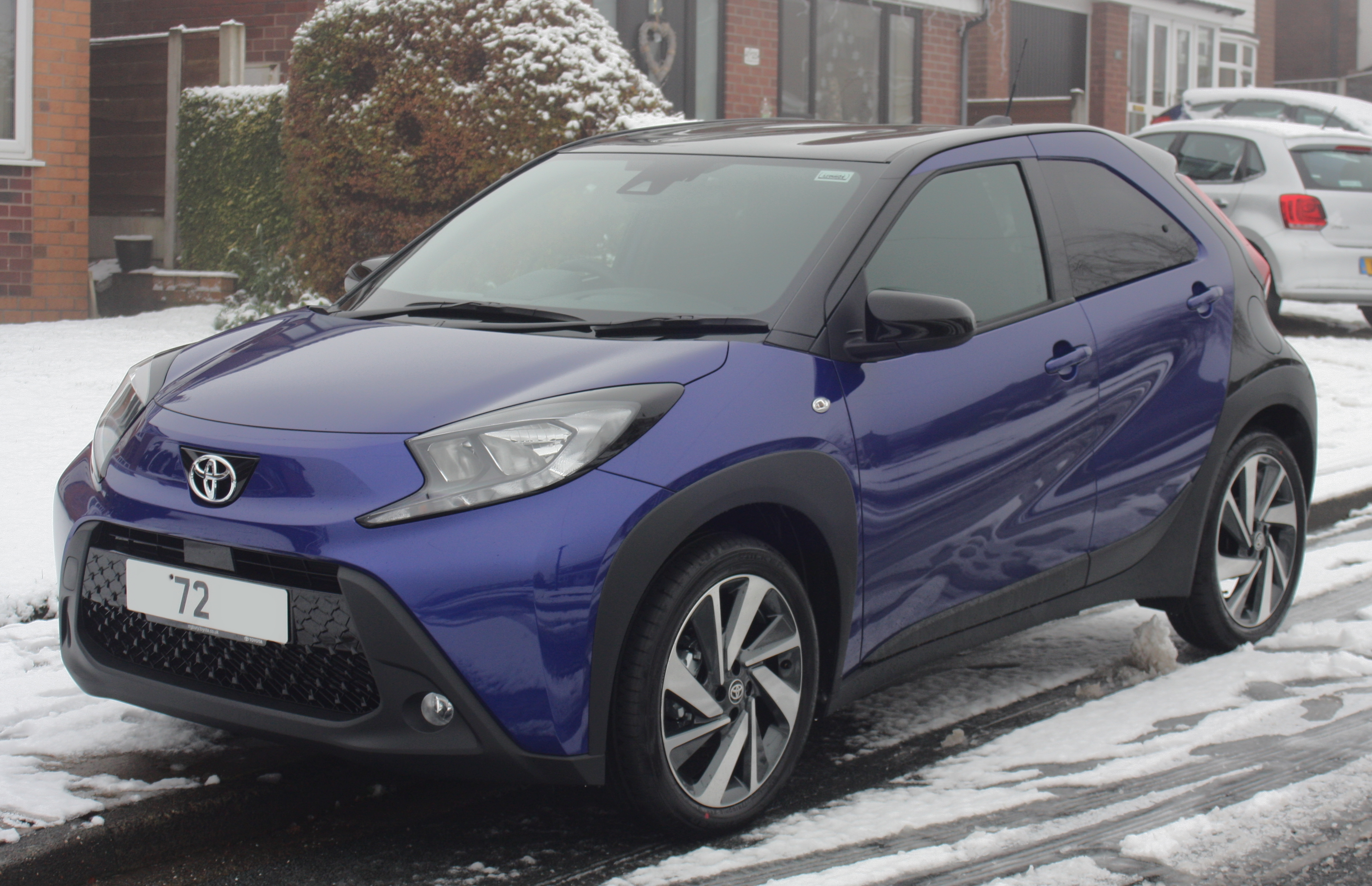
Toyota Aygo X
1st generation (2022–present)
Made in Czech Republic

10,000 - 50,000 sales

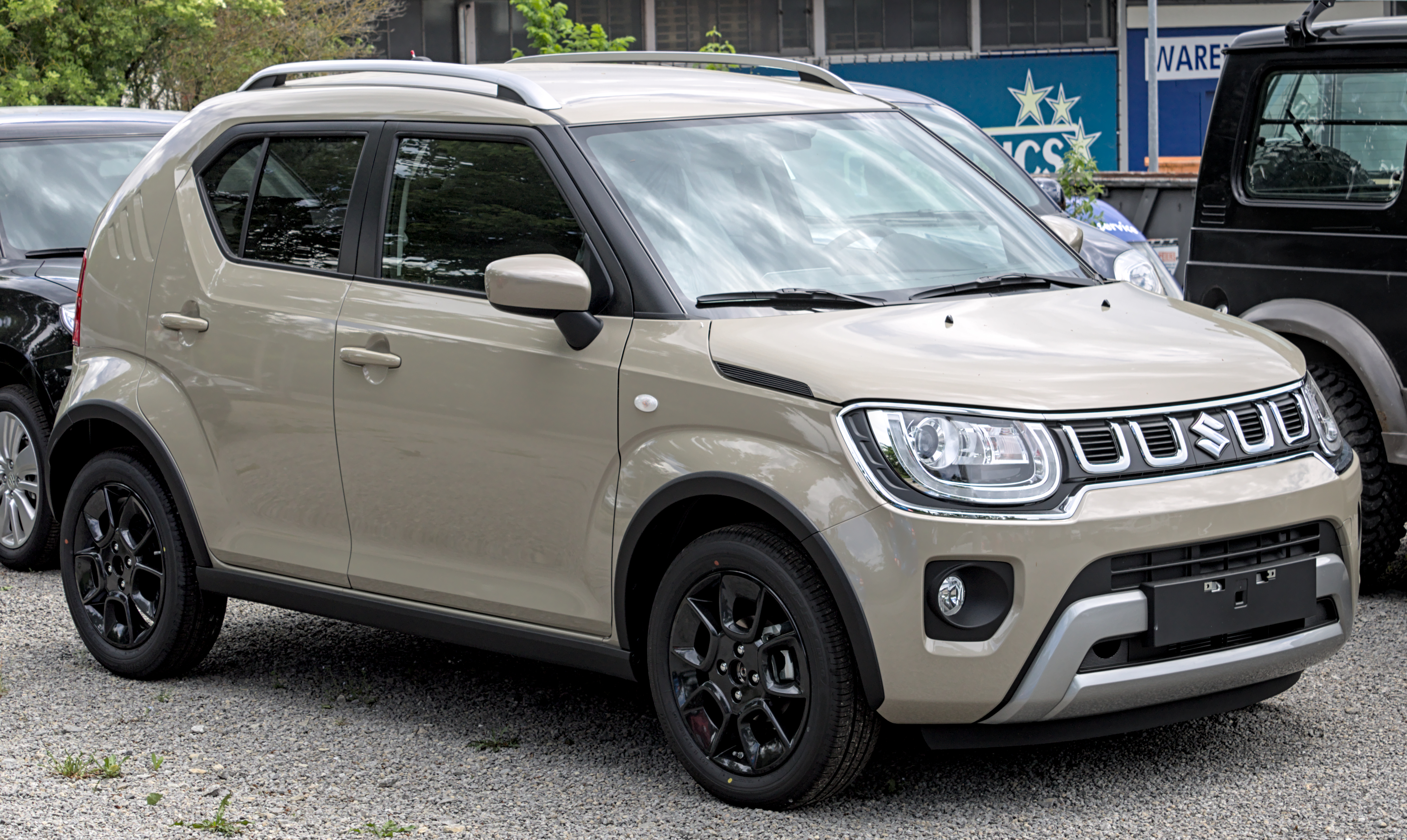
Suzuki Ignis
2nd generation (2016–2026)
Made in India

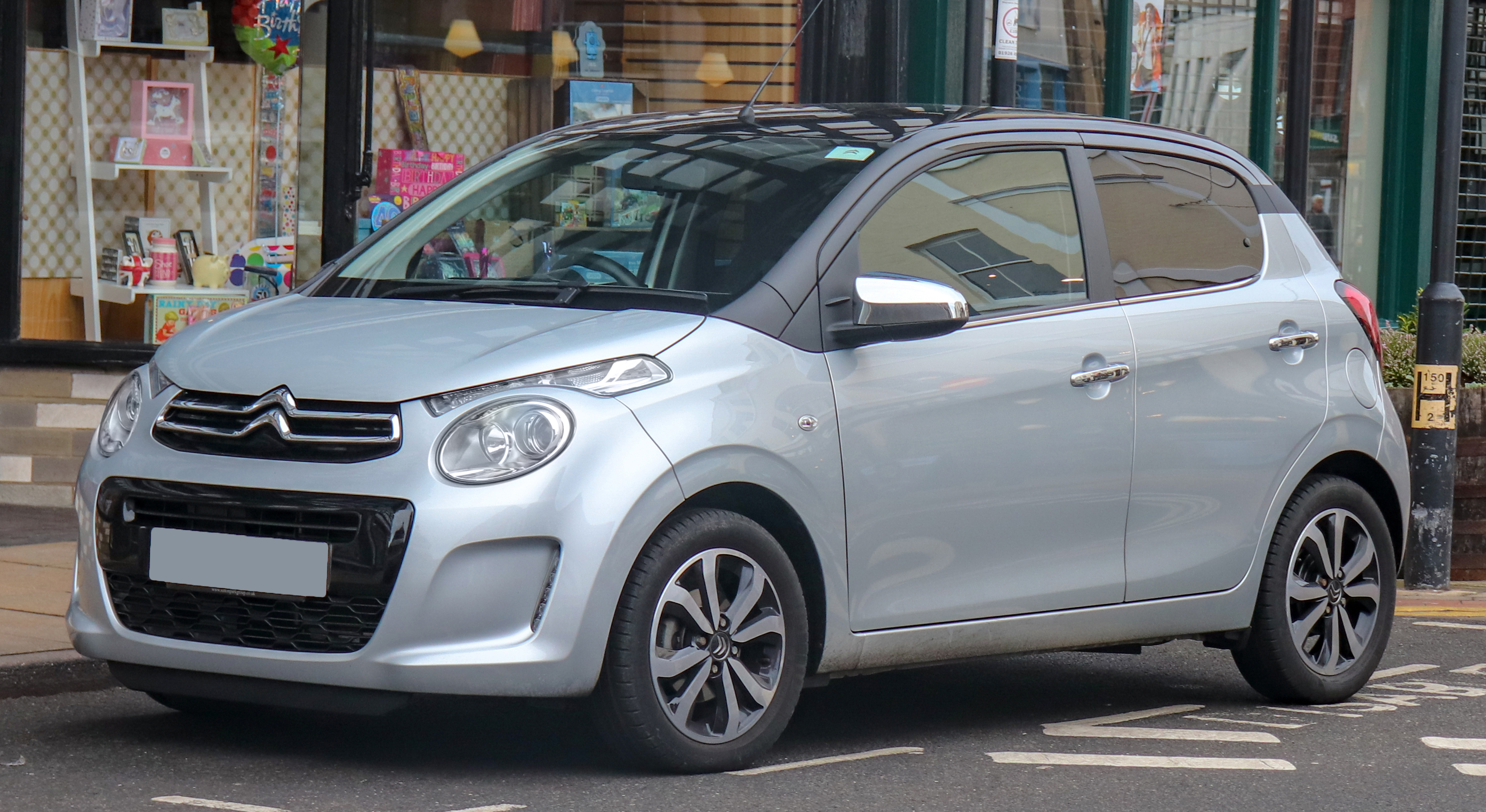
Citroën C1
2nd generation (2014–2021)
Made in Czech Republic

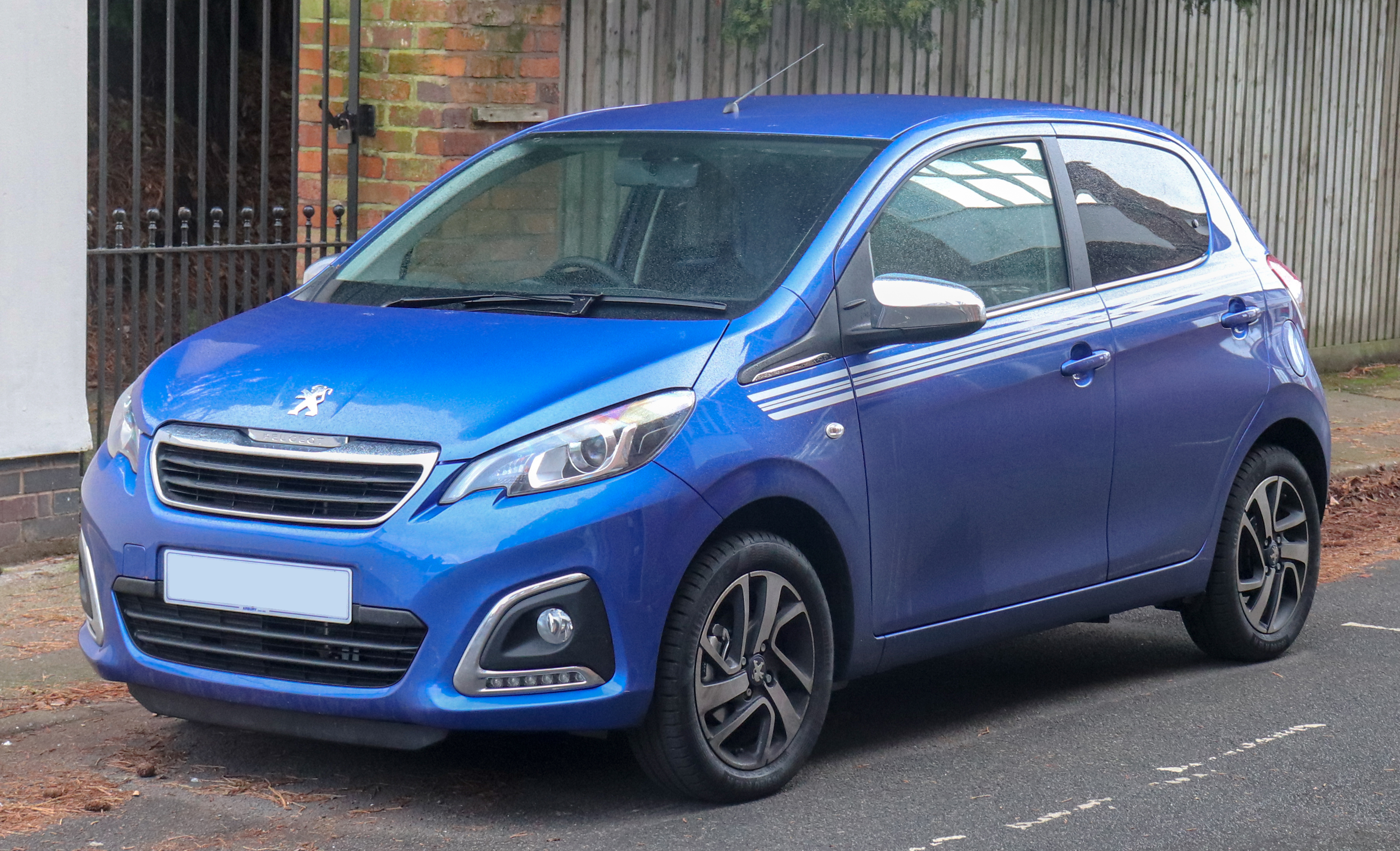
Peugeot 108
2nd generation (2014–2021)
Made in Czech Republic

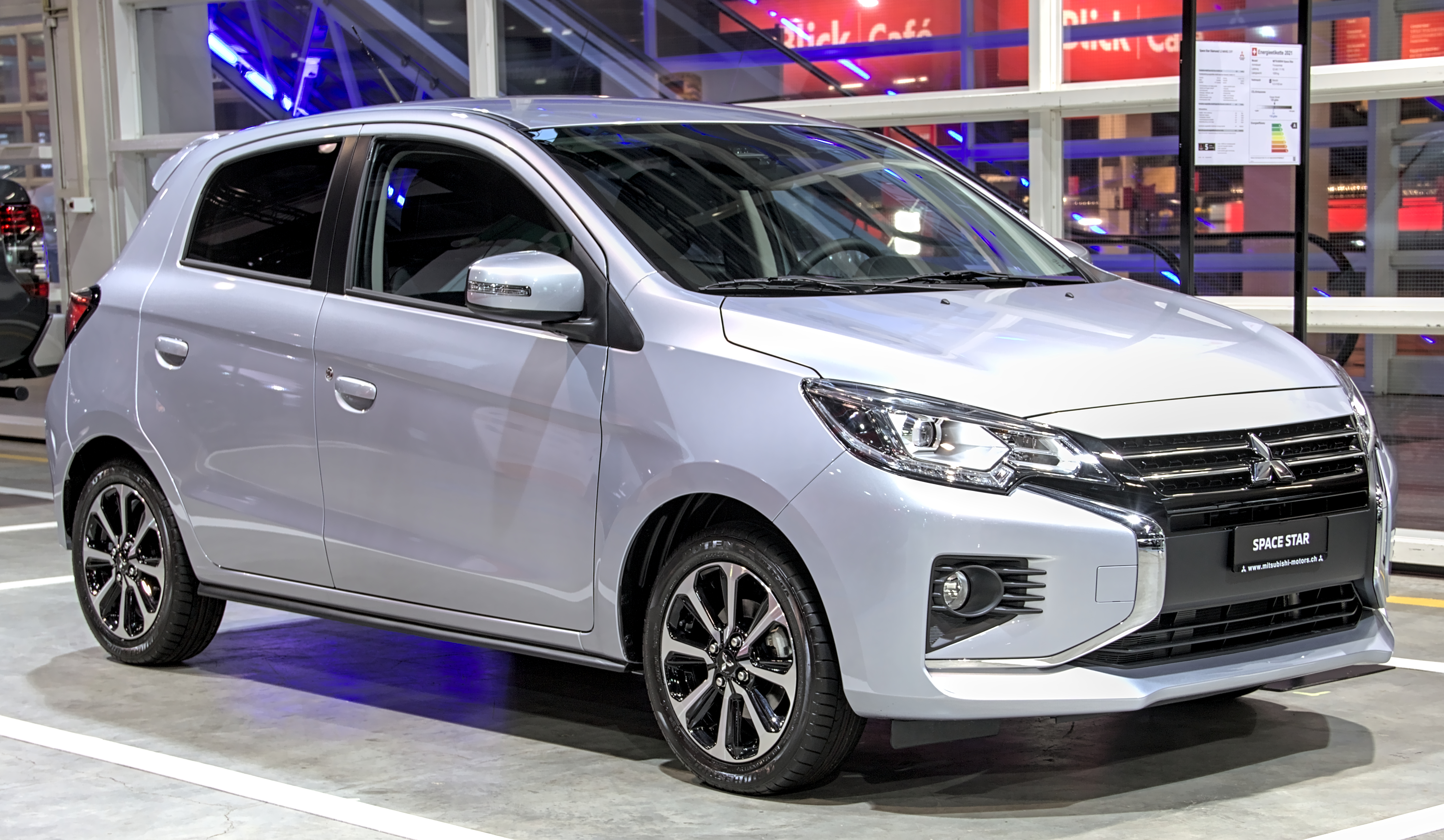
Mitsubishi Mirage
6th generation (2012–2024)
Made in Thailand

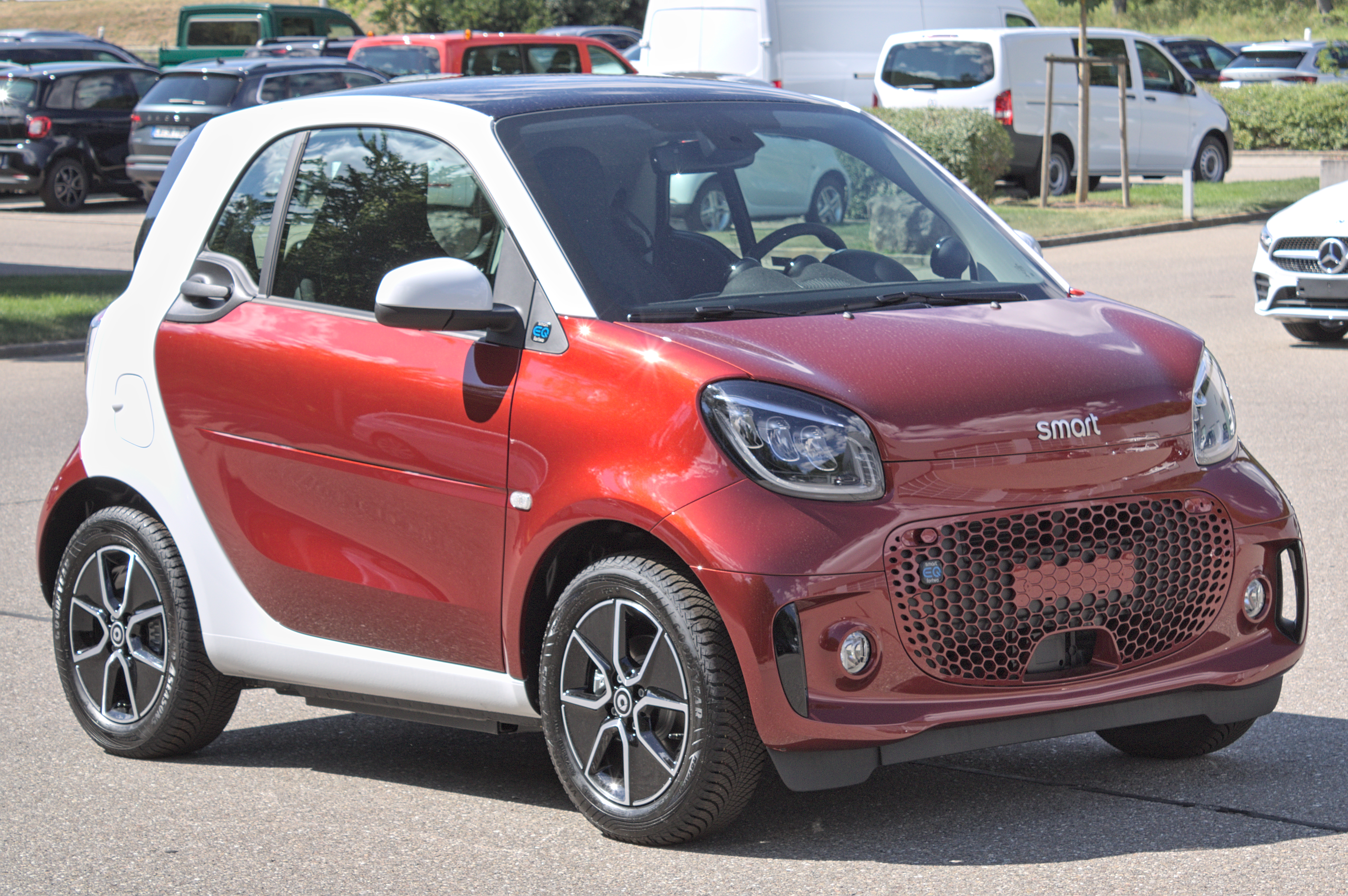
smart EQ fortwo
3rd generation (2016–2024)
Made in France

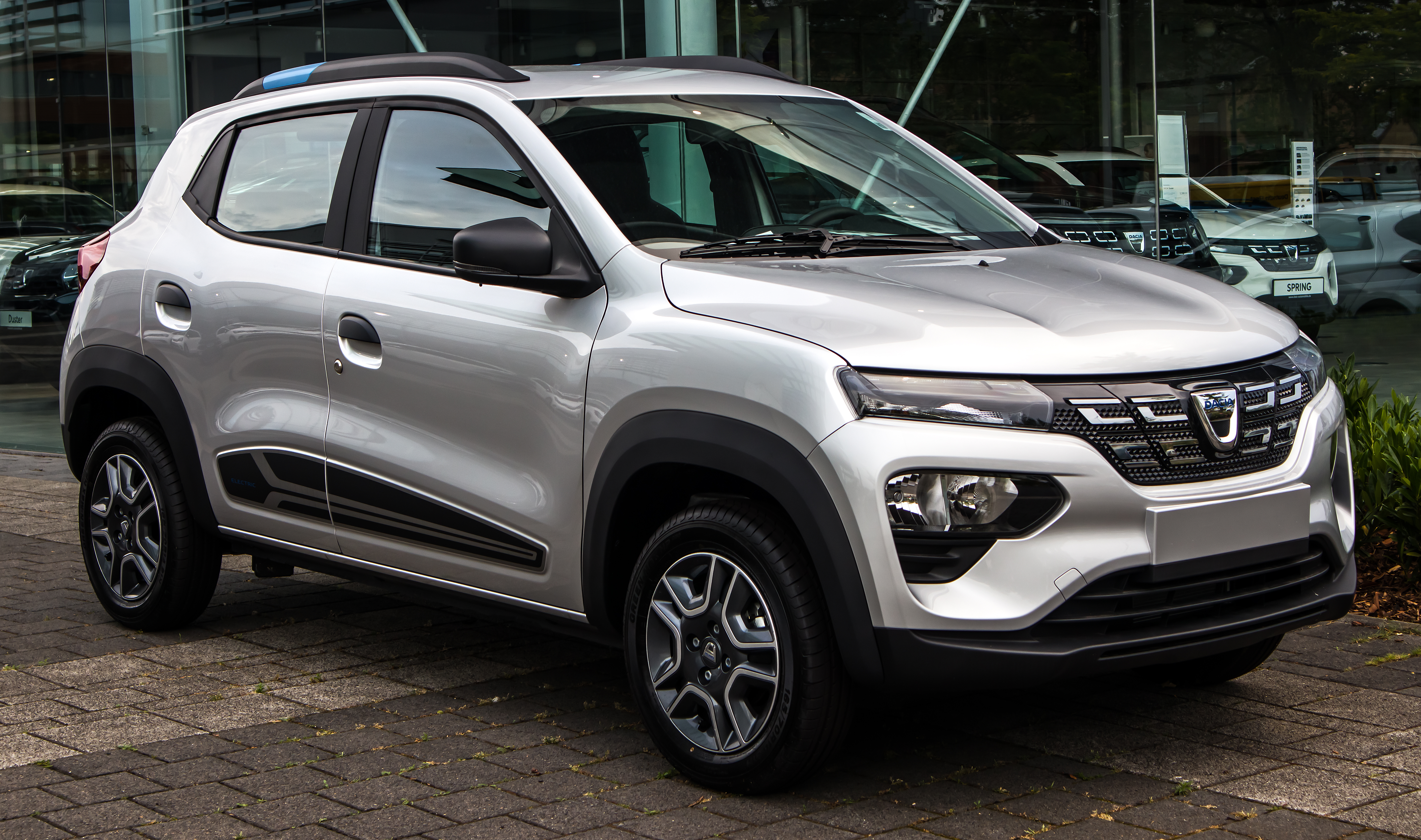
Dacia Spring
1st generation (2021–present)
Made in China

== Sales figures in Europe ==
2022 rank	Brand	Model	2013	2014	2015	2016	2017	2018	2019	2020	2021	2022	% change (2021–2022)
1	Fiat	Panda	152,727	152,045	171,377	190,432	187,049	168,094	184,027	145,907	131,723	125,463	▼ -5%
2	Hyundai	i10	60,324	80,819	86,004	85,385	90,603	83,102	78,791	50,233	56,074	54,137	▼ -3.45%
3	Kia	Picanto	50,524	51,222	54,036	54,982	62,161	74,526	74,305	49,211	59,949	51,962	▼ -13.32%
4	Dacia	Spring	-	-	-	-	-	-	-	1,724	25,740	48,431	▲ +88.15
5	Renault	Twingo	78,432	81,574	95,808	84,766	77,326	86,221	87,383	73,345	58,161	42,526	▼ -27%
6	Volkswagen	Up!	130,039	124,845	105,348	96,836	100,715	97,366	80,048	59,578	69,400	39,147	▼ -43.59%
7	Mitsubishi	Mirage/Space Star	13,978	22,008	29,547	27,386	30,016	36,105	38,002	35,703	32,662	27,964	▼ -14.38%
8	Suzuki	Ignis	-	-	-	1,602	41,166	43,774	38,091	37,568	42,206	20,826	▼ -50.66%
9	Smart	Fortwo	65,226	52,059	57,056	69,169	65,800	62,361	77,766	19,576	26,869	17,560	▼ -34.65%
10	Toyota	Aygo	57,002	68,874	86,085	84,321	84,588	92,187	99,510	82,711	82,820	9,646	▼ -88.35%
11	Peugeot	108	-	31,087	68,522	63,561	55,831	57,257	54,230	43,629	34,689	3,875	▼ -88.83%
12	Smart	Forfour		3,757	39,543	37,133	34,253	34,975	36,736	7,640	8,823	3,633	▼ -58.82%
13	Citroën	C1	56,722	53,518	63,695	62,537	53,292	52,020	49,900	40,578	35,897	3,559	▼ -90.09%
14	Škoda	Citigo	44,851	40,616	38,735	38,664	35,698	36,450	30,786	14,120	5,264	53	▼ -98.99%
15	SEAT	Mii	28,608	24,865	24,298	19,882	15,412	13,031	12,641	7,790	9,428	51	▼ -99.46%
	Fiat	500 (2007)	158,918	180,403	180,005	183,194	189,360	188,448	175,017	141,313	175,950	-	
	Renault	Kwid	-	-	-	-	-	-	-	65	439	-	
	Suzuki	Celerio	-	894	25,393	26,465	23,417	20,836	13,275	2,035	16	-	
	Citroën	C-Zero	-	-	1,075	1,780	1,105	1,247	980	1,839	14	-	
	Peugeot	iOn	-	-	1,461	1,881	1,544	1,651	865	333	4	-	
	Citroën	E-Mehari	-	-	-	569	353	321	154	78	-		
	Mitsubishi	i-MiEV	-	-	714	484	447	325	171	57	-		
	Opel/Vauxhall	Adam	45,756	54,207	55,278	52,938	48,181	41,817	31,129	5	-		
	Mitsubishi	Attrage	-	-	352	168	114	62	88	1	-		
	Opel/Vauxhall	Karl/Viva	-	-	28,607	57,458	49,516	48,292	47,504	0	-		
	DR Automobiles	Zero	-	-	-	261	174	-	-	0	-		
	Lancia/Chrysler	Ypsilon	57,613	62,807	59,501	66,941	-	-	-	-	-		
	Ford	Ka	50,012	52,854	48,368	21,333	204	16	-	-	-		
	Peugeot	107	55,244	24,356	88	5	1	2	-	-	-		
	Chevrolet	Spark	37,268	10,138	479	96	2	3	-	-	-		
	Suzuki	Alto	26,821	26,876	5,710	4	2	-	-	-	-		
	Suzuki	Splash	15,563	13,232	2,663	11	-	-	-	-	-		
	Opel/Vauxhall	Agila	14,020	12,200	2,054	19	1	-	-	-	-		
	Toyota	iQ	5,462	3,593	292	172	2	3	-	-	-		
	Tata	Indica		345	52	3	-	-	-	-	-		
	Nissan	Pixo	3,321	131	-	-	-	-	-	-	-		
	DR Automobiles	DR1	21	-	-	-	-	-	-	-	-		
	Daihatsu	Cuore/Charade	5	-	-	-	-	-	-	-	-		
	Volkswagen	Fox	1	-	-	-	-	-	-	-	-		
	Abarth	500	-	-	-	-	18,499	20,570	19,157	-	-		
Segment total			1,208,431	1,229,352	1,332,146	1,330,438	1,266,832	1,261,062	1,230,556	814,974	856,129	448,833	▼ -47.57%
Source													

== Market share in Europe ==
Year	2017	2018	2019	2020	2021	2024
Share	8.1%	8%	7.7%	6.8%	7.3%	4.2%

2019 - In 2019, sales of minicars were down 2% compared to a total market gain of 1% which means this segment now makes up 7.7% of the total European car market at 1.21 million sales, down from 8% in 2018. And with margins on minicars under pressure due to increased costs to comply with stricter safety and emissions standards, manufacturers are scaling back investments in to minicars or switching to an EV-only strategy.

In Italy, A-segment cars represented 16.4% of car sales in the first half of 2019.

2020 - European sales of minicars were down by a third in 2020, which translates to nearly 400,000 fewer sales and means the segment loses market share as the overall market is down 24%. As a result, this segment now makes up 6.8% of the total European car market, down from 7.7% last year. And their share is expected to shrink further in coming years, as manufacturers are pulling out of this segment or switching their models to EV-only. This is a result of increasing costs to comply with stricter safety and especially emissions standards, which makes minicars nearly unprofitable, especially considering that for most models from European brands this is the only market.

== Market share in other countries ==
In the United States, minicar segment cars represented 0.5% of the market share.

In 2020 the highest selling minicar segment cars in the U.S. were the Chevrolet Spark, Mitsubishi Mirage and Mini Cooper.

In India, historically the A-segment cars had the highest sales. Sales have been in decline in recent years, falling from 70,000 sales per month in 2014 to 47,000 sales per month in 2016.

As of 2019, several A-segment cars had successes outside Europe, such as Hyundai Grand i10, Honda Brio, Kia Picanto, Tata Tiago, Toyota Wigo, Suzuki Celerio, Suzuki Wagon R, Suzuki/Maruti Alto, Ford Figo, Smart ForTwo, Citroën C1, Peugeot 108, and modern Fiat 500.

== See also ==
- B-segment
- Crossover city car
- Economy car
- Euro Car Segment
- Hatchback
- Kei car
- Kei truck
- Microcar
- Microvan
- Neighborhood electric vehicle
- Quadricycle (EU vehicle classification)
- Vehicle size class
