= Nissan Pixo =

Automotive nameplate by Nissan

The Nissan Pixo is an automobile nameplate used by the Japanese automobile manufacturer Nissan for several city car (A-segment) models:

- Suzuki Alto, rebadged as the Nissan Pixo between 2009 and 2013
- Renault Twingo E-Tech, rebadged as the Nissan Pixo EV since 2026
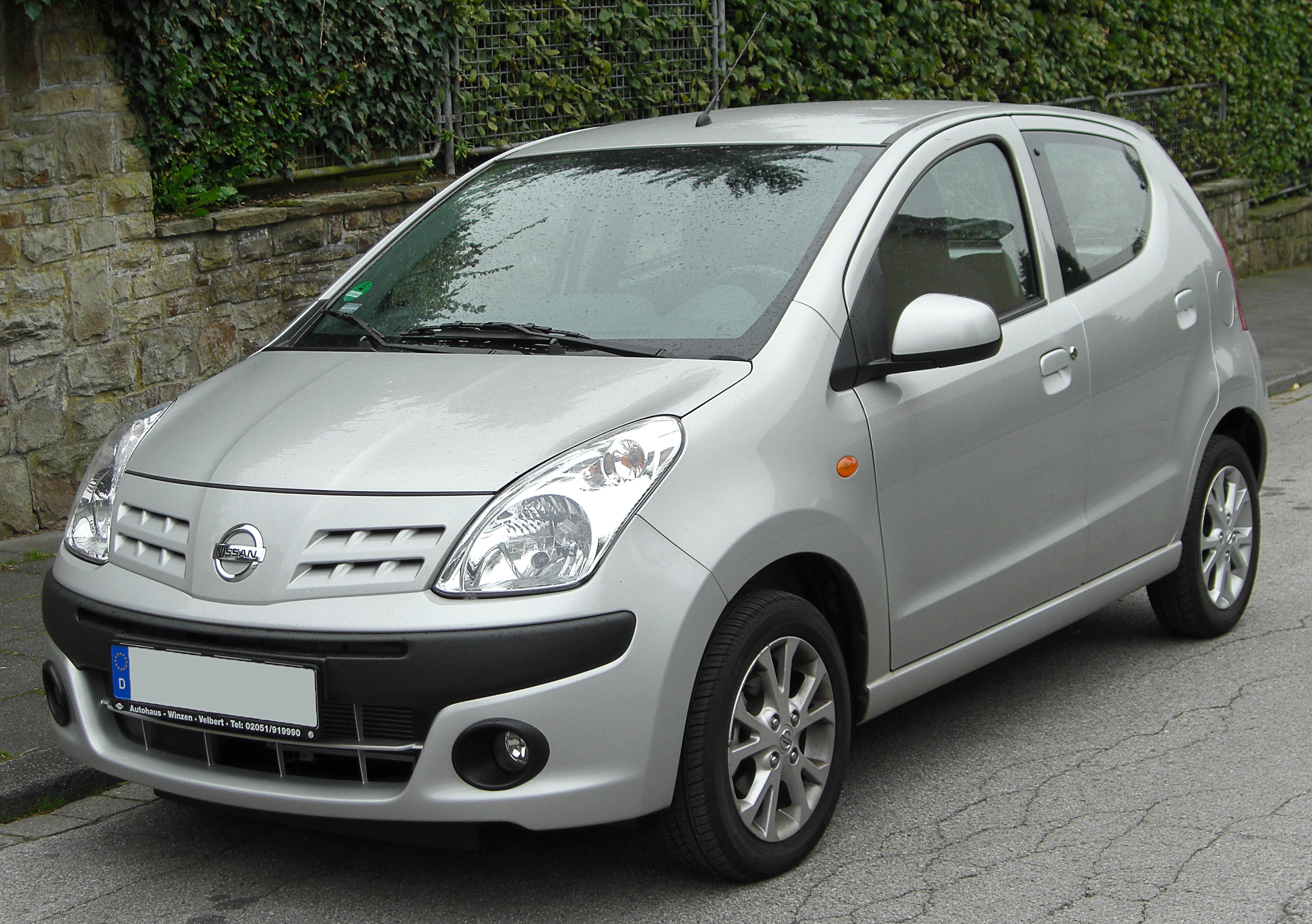
Nissan Pixo (Suzuki Alto-based model)

Nissan Pixo EV (Renault Twingo E-Tech-based model)
