= Revoz =

Slovene car manufacturer

Revoz d.d.

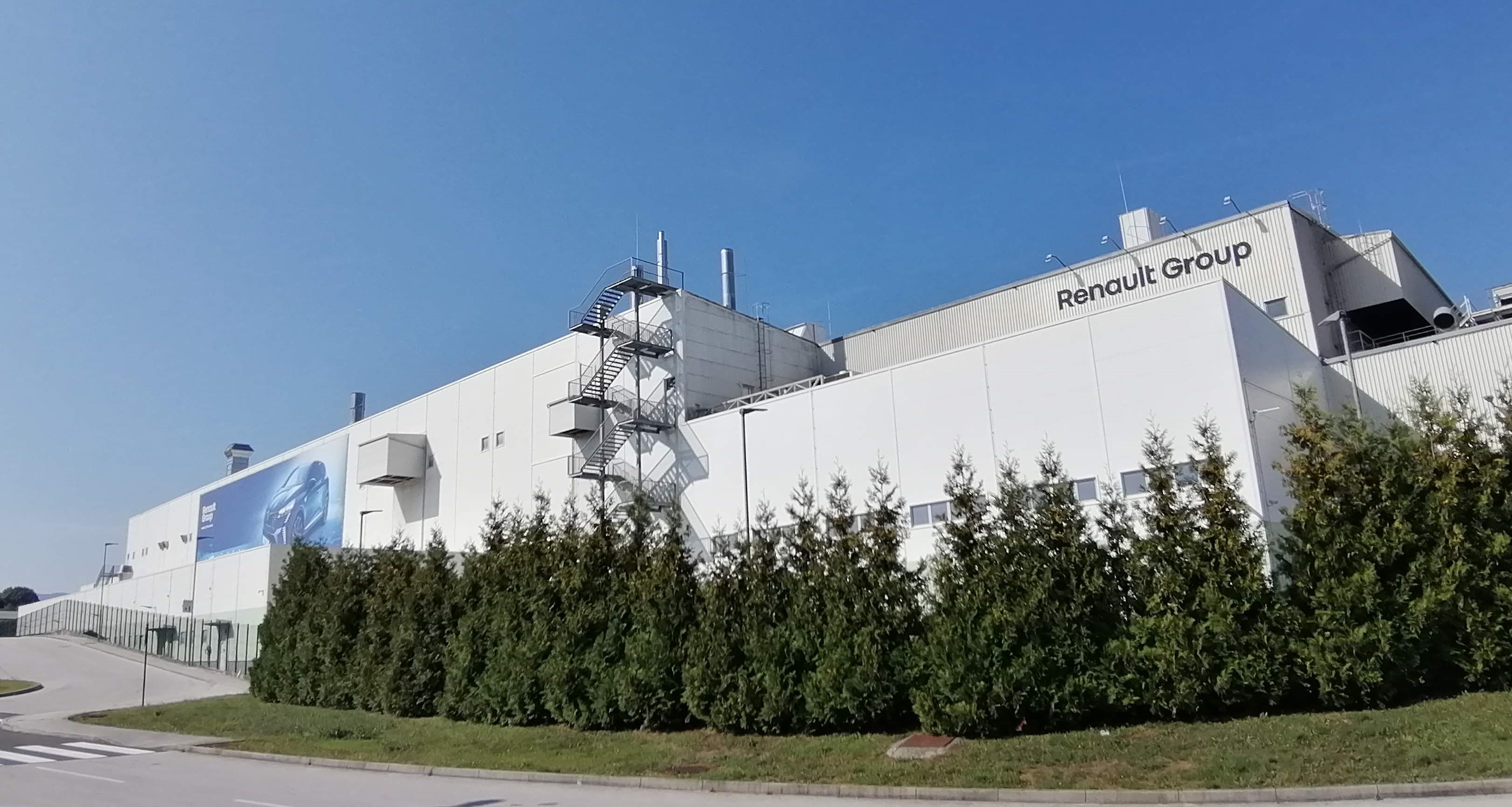
- Type: Subsidiary
- Industry: Automotive
- Predecessor: Industrija motornih vozil
- Founded: June 1988
- Headquarters: Novo Mesto, Slovenia
- Key people: Jože Bele (CEO)
- Production output: ▼141,670 (2020)
- Revenue: ▼€1,391.49 million (2020)
- Operating income: ▼€57.52 million (2020)
- Net income: ▼€−1.58 million (2020)
- Total assets: ▼€465.04 million (2020)
- Total equity: ▼€167.17 million (2020)
- Number of employees: ▼2,408 (December 2020)
- Parent: Renault
- Website: www.revoz.si

Revoz (Slovene pronunciation: [ɾɛˈʋɔz]) is a Slovene car manufacturer based in Novo Mesto and the subsidiary company of French car manufacturer Renault. It is the only automaker in the country and one of its largest exporters. The company was established in June 1988 as a joint venture between Renault and Industrija Motornih Vozil. In 2004, it became a wholly owned subsidiary of Renault.

== History ==
=== 1959–1988 ===
==== Early Renault manufacturing deal with Litostroj ====
The first assembly deal of Renault in Slovenia was signed with Ljubljana-based Litostroj in 1969. In November of that year Litostroj started to produce under licence the Renault 4, which was eventually nicknamed "Katrca" (phonetically from the French 'quatre' in a diminutive form) and became the most-produced Renault model within the country. Litostroj also manufactured transmissions for French-assembled vehicles. The deal ended in 1972.

==== Industrija Motornih Vozil ====
In the mid-1950s, a Slovenian company called Agroservis partnered with Auto Union, building a factory to produce DKW models called Moto Montaža. In 1959, it was renamed Industrija motornih vozil (Industry of Motor Vehicles) or IMV. From 1963 to 1972 it assembled British Motor Corporation's Austins, but in 1973 it signed a partnership agreement with Renault, building Renaults 4 (mainly), 12, 16 and 18. In 1976 IMV became the second-largest manufacturer by volume in Yugoslavia after Zastava. The company manufactured 26,000–49,000 cars per year between 1977 and 1990, but huge misguided investments in 1978 left it on the verge of bankruptcy. IMV also assembled the Renault 9 locally.

=== 1988–present ===
In 1988, Renault (as minority holder) and IMV formed a joint venture and created Revoz. Since the early 1990s it became one of the largest exporters (more than 5% of total country's exports) and employers (with more than 2000 workers) of Slovenia. The company started to manufacture the Renault 5 alongside the 4 (Revoz was the last plant where these cars were built). In 1991, Renault became the major company's shareholder, with a 54% stake. According to the Organisation for Economic Co-operation and Development the key reason behind Renault's investment was to have a factory for supplying the big Yugoslavia's domestic market, although that country's dissolution made it to transform Revoz into an export-oriented company. Since 1993, the company assembles the Clio. Revoz managed the Serbian operations until a Renault subsidiary was created.

In December 2001, Renault increased its ownership to 66,68%. In 2002, Revoz's commercial branch was split to form the subsidiary Renault Nissan Slovenia d.o.o, in charge of sales. In 2004, Revoz became a wholly owned subsidiary of Renault. From 2010 to 2013, the company manufactured the Wind.

==== Impact of the European crisis ====
In early 2012, with European markets' demand declining, the company had to suspend its night shift and personnel. Revoz also negotiated with the trade unions shorter work shifts. In January 2013, the production returned to normal levels. The company manufactured new Renault and Daimler models to improve the production output. The first model developed by the Renault-Daimler collaboration, the third-generation Renault Twingo, entered into production in May 2014 and was followed by Daimler's second-generation Smart Forfour by autumn 2014, with both cars sharing many parts.

By 2022, the Smart Forfour production ended, increasing the company's idle manufacturing capacity, and demand for its products further decreased because of the COVID-19 pandemic, chips shortages, and declining demand for small cars in Western Europe. Revoz reduced its workforce in 2021 and 2022, keeping just one work shift for the Clio and Twingo.

== Novo Mesto factory ==
The Revoz factory is located in Novo Mesto, covering 584,000 square meters. Since April 2007 it has produced the Twingo having, since 1993, assembled the Clio. It has a Sheet Metal Shaping Department (press shop), a Paint Shop Department and an Assembly Shop. In 2010 the production output was of 212,680 cars.

== Car models ==
The following car models were or are still being manufactured in Novo Mesto:

=== Former models ===
- Renault Wind
- Renault Twingo
- Renault Twingo Sport
- Renault Clio Storia
- Smart Forfour
- Renault Clio 4 (until 2019)
- Smart EQ Forfour (until 2022)
- Renault Twingo E-Tech
- Renault Clio 5 (until 2026)
- Mitsubishi Colt (until 2026)
