= Xingtai XTQ1020 =

Overview
- Manufacturer: Xingtai 114 Automobile Factory
- Production: 1980s – 1990s
- Assembly: China: Yuliu Village, Xingtai City, Hebei Province

Body and chassis
- Class: Pickup truck
- Body style: 4-door short bed
- Platform: modified Dacia Pick-Up platform

Chronology
- Successor: Dacia 1307 Double Cab (spirituality)

The Xingtai XTQ1020 was a 2-tonne pickup truck produced by Xingtai 114 Automobile Factory. It had a four-door body, long before Dacia produced such a variant.

== Overview ==
Xingtai 114 Automobile Factory assembled the Dacia pickup in the 1980s and 1990s, according to a Chinese-language overview of the company's history.

They also manufactured a station wagon version, based on the Dacia 1310, with reports of a sedan variant and the Dacia 1309 being offered.

== Other versions ==
The Shenyang Sanshan Company produced their own version of the Xingtai XTQ1020, which had the same design.

== Media ==
The Xingtai XTQ1020 was featured in the 1993 Chinese film Dai qiang de ge nu.
