= Dacia 1325 =

Dacia 1325 Liberta
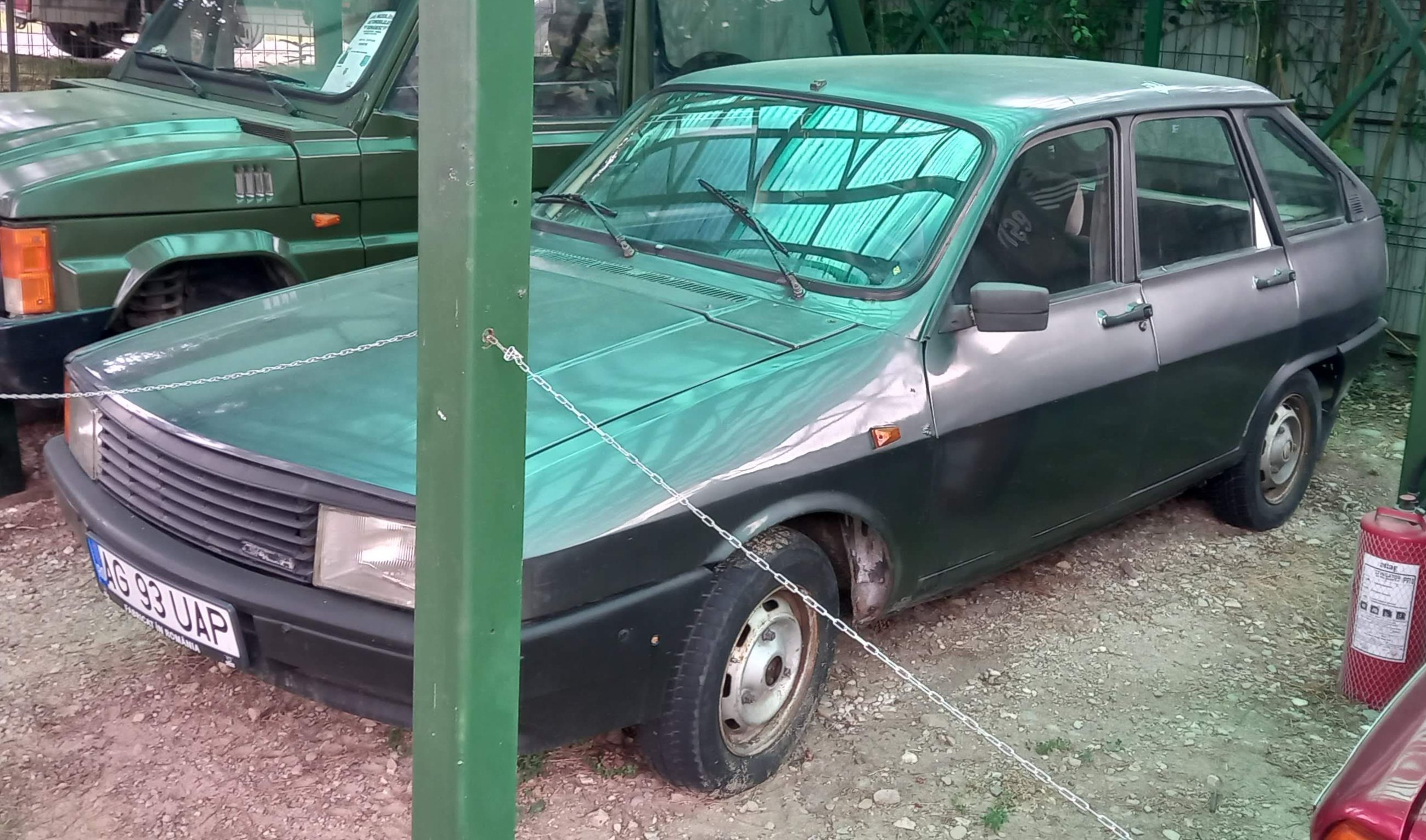

Overview
- Manufacturer: Dacia
- Production: 1991–1996
- Assembly: Romania: Mioveni

Body and chassis
- Class: Small family car
- Body style: 5-door hatchback
- Layout: FF layout
- Related: Dacia 1310

Powertrain
- Engine: 1.4 L I4; 1.6 L I4
- Transmission: 5-speed manual

Dimensions
- Wheelbase: 2,441 mm (96.1 in)
- Length: 4,397 mm (173.1 in)
- Width: 1,636 mm (64.4 in)
- Height: 1,430 mm (56 in)
- Curb weight: 935 kg (2,061 lb)

Chronology
- Predecessor: Dacia 1320

The Dacia 1325 (Romanian pronunciation: [ˈdatʃi.a]), also known as 1325 Liberta or simply as Liberta, was a car manufactured by Romanian auto marque Dacia from 1991 to 1996.

== History ==
The Dacia 1325 was the hatchback version of the Dacia 1310. Some photos exist of Dacia 1325 Libertas fitted with the final CN4 front fascia, although rare. It was the successor to the Dacia 1320 hatchback, which was built from 1987 until 1990. At first the 1325 was just an updated copy of the old 1310, but in 1993 it received a facelift matching that of the 1310, and it remained in production until 1996.

As the 1325 cost more than the more desirable station wagon model, sales were limited. Although more successful than the earlier 1320, only about 7,800 examples were built in total. Exports were limited to nearby Eastern European countries and also Greece.

== Engines ==
The 1.3-liter engine was only available in the comparably expensive 1325 for the first year of production.

| Name | Capacity | Type | Power | Torque | Top speed | Combined consumption | Notes |
|---|---|---|---|---|---|---|---|
| 1.3 | 1289 cc | 8 valves OHV | 54 PS (40 kW) at 5250 rpm | 88 N⋅m (65 lb⋅ft) at 3000 rpm | 140 km/h (87 mph) | 7.0 liters/100 km | 1991–1992 |
| 1.4 | 1397 cc | 8 valves OHV | 64 PS (47 kW) at 5400 rpm | 103 N⋅m (76 lb⋅ft) at 3000 rpm | 145 km/h (90 mph) | 7.0 liters/100 km | |
| 1.6 | 1557 cc | 8 valves OHV | 73 PS (54 kW) at 5000 rpm | 125 N⋅m (92 lb⋅ft) at 2500 rpm | 160 km/h (99 mph) | 7.5 liters/100 km | |

== See also ==
- Dacia 1310
