= Dacia 1310 =

Dacia 1210/1310/1410
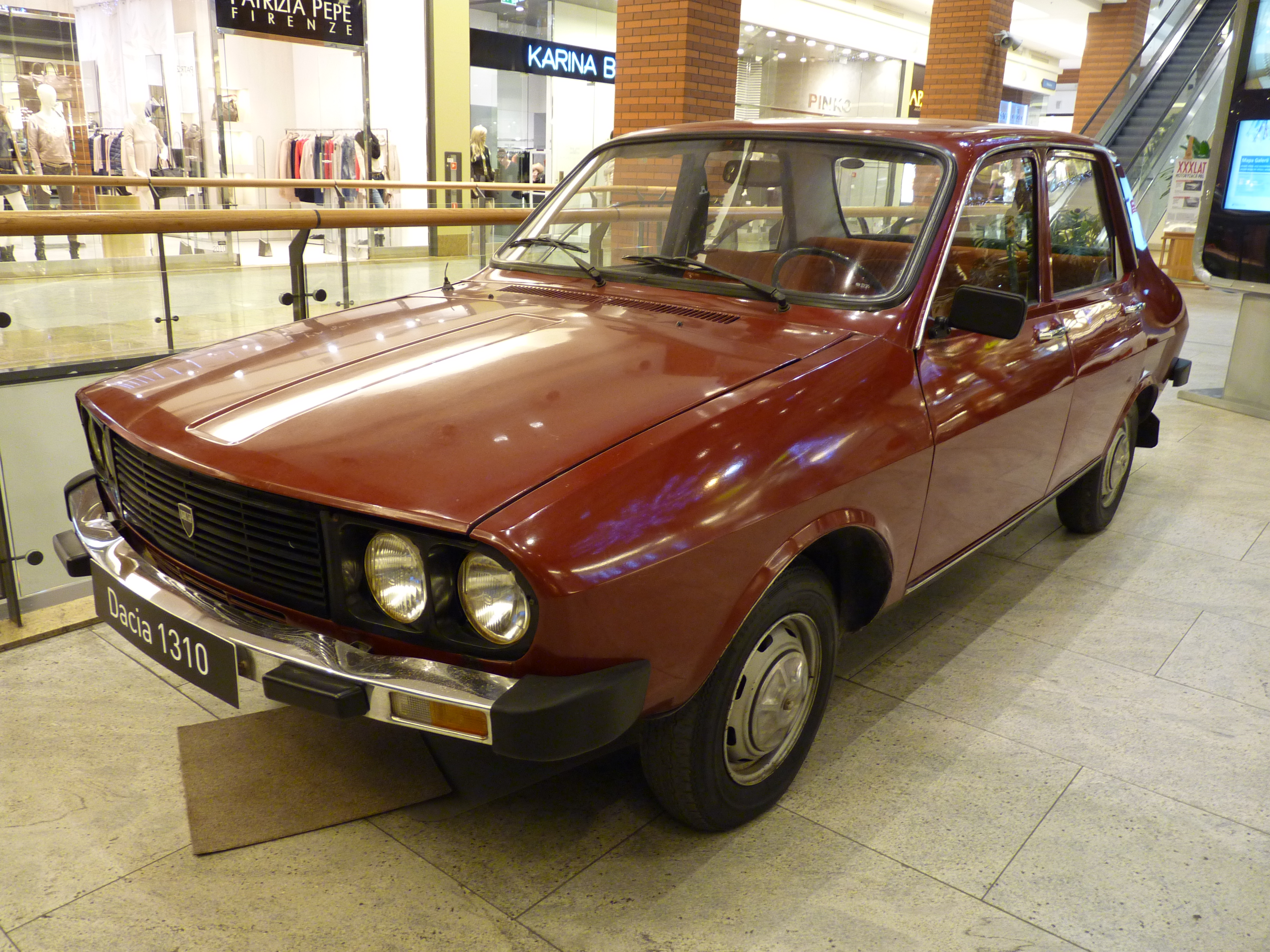
- Dacia 1310 P (Poland)

Overview
- Manufacturer: Dacia
- Also called: Dacia Denem (United Kingdom: 1982–1984); Delta 1310 (Albania, Greece, Israel, North Macedonia); Aro-Familia (Germany); Dacia Cristal (South Africa); Dacia Berlină / Break (Romania: 2002–2004); Delta Galidi / Denem (Greece, Israel)
- Production: 1979–2004
- Assembly: Romania: Mioveni

Body and chassis
- Class: Small family car (C)
- Body style: 4-door saloon 5-door estate 5-door hatchback 2-door coupé
- Layout: Front-engine, front-wheel-drive

Chronology
- Predecessor: Dacia 1300
- Successor: Dacia Nova; Dacia Logan

The Dacia 1310 is a family of automobiles produced and sold exclusively by Dacia between 1979 and the beginning of 1999, and from 1999 to 2006 jointly by the French manufacturer Renault and its Romanian subsidiary Dacia. In 1979, Dacia presented the 1310 model at the Bucharest Auto Show as the successor of the Dacia 1300. Together with the Dacia 1300, a total of 2,278,691 units were produced, the last sedan being manufactured on July 21, 2004, and the last pick-up truck in December 2006. In the same year, its successor, the Dacia Logan, was launched.

It was produced, like the Dacia 1300, in two body variants (saloon and estate), but was also available in hatchback (Dacia 1320 and Dacia 1325 Liberta, produced between 1988 and 1996), pick-up (the Dacia Pick-Up range, produced between 1975 and 2006), and coupé variants (Sport version, largely handmade in small numbers between 1981 and 1992).

== History ==
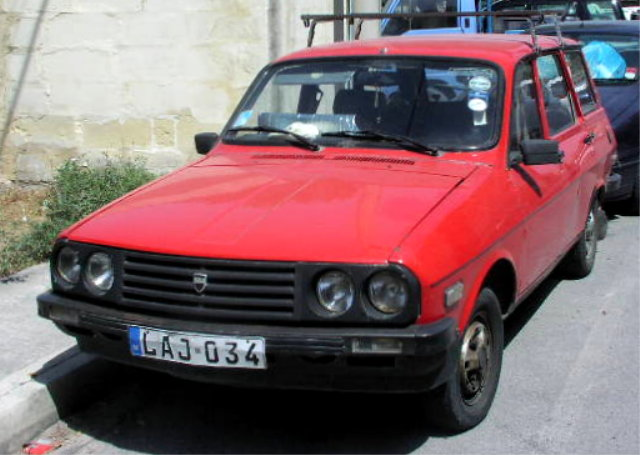
Dacia 1310 (estate; 1984–1990)

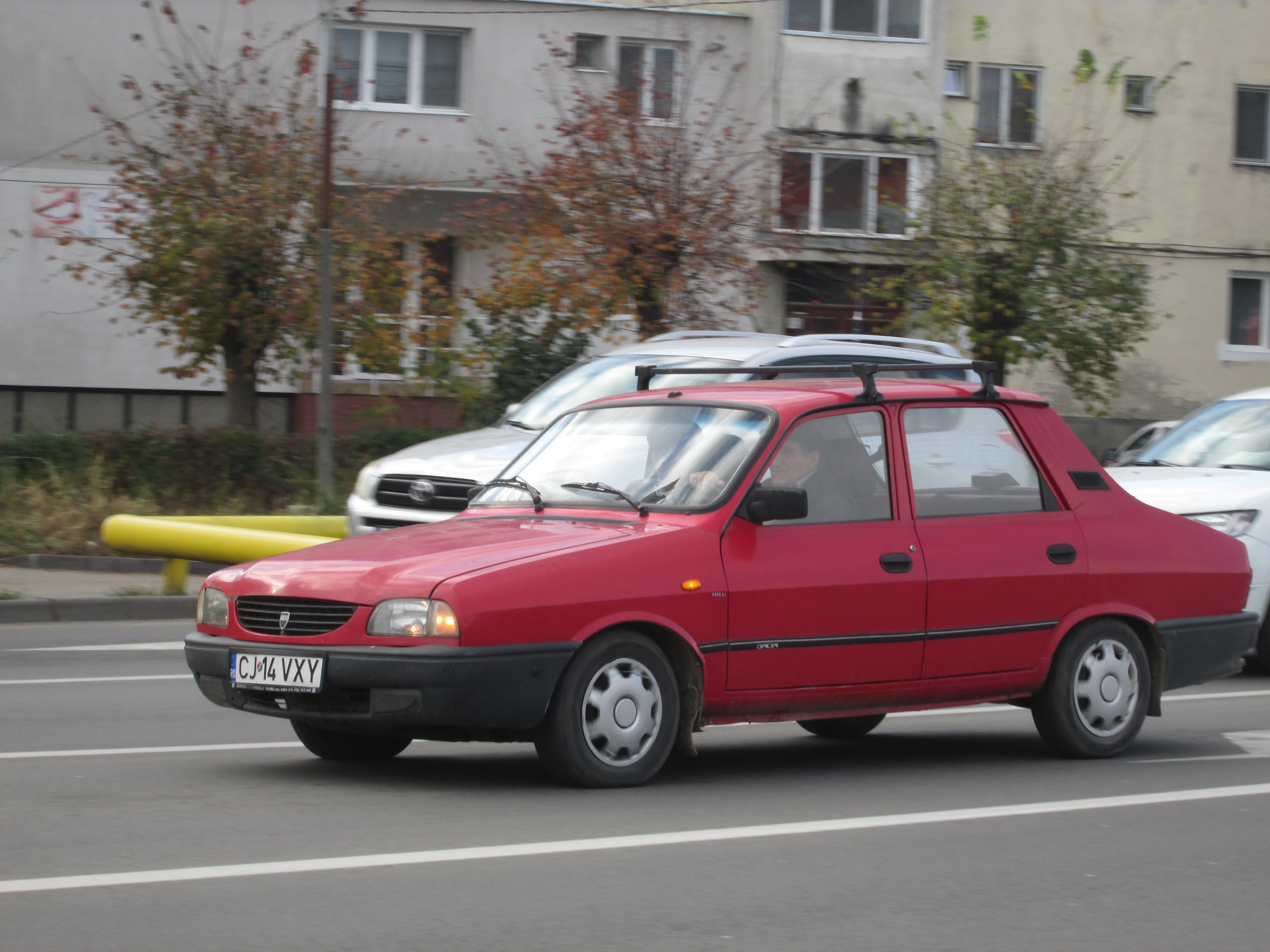
In the last years (1999–2004), the Dacia 1310 looked like this, commonly nicknamed "Iliescu's smile", this car is seen at Turda in 2018. Nowadays this is the most seen model, as 1979–1998 models are becoming rare.

After the cooperation with Renault ceased in 1978, Dacia presented a revised version of the 1300 at the 1979 Bucharest Auto Show. In 1982, its name was changed to Dacia 1310, and later also came the "1210", "1410" and a few other versions.

In 1983, the whole range was facelifted for the 1984 model year. A coupé version of the car, the 1410 Sport, with two doors and a lowered roof, was also released in 1983. In 1987 the Dacia 1320 liftback was introduced.

In 1989, a new generation of Dacia 1310 was launched in estate and sedan versions. It was a minor modification of the previous generation with new headlights. A new liftback version named Dacia 1325 Liberta was introduced in 1990. The 1310 van was also launched in 1990. The fully facelifted Dacia 13xx range was introduced in 1993.

By the 1980s, the model was becoming dated and its chassis was no longer able to meet safety standards of the era, prompting Dacia to start work on a replacement. However, financial and political setbacks caused that replacement, the Dacia Nova, to be delayed until 1994, by which time it was already outdated. Although the newer Nova range (later evolving into Dacia SupeRNova and Dacia Solenza) sold well and displayed better road manners, it never replaced the 1310 range, due to its higher price, smaller interior and other disappointing factors (such as being offered only in a liftback body).

Therefore, Dacia was forced to facelift the 1310 model yet again, in 1999. The last 1310 model was simply named "Berlina" or "Break", for sedan or estate respectively. In an effort to keep up with modern standards, the last version was equipped with fuel injection and a catalytic converter, meeting Euro2 emission standards.

Since the original model in 1969, constant change in automobile size meant that the 1310 was a compact sedan by the end of its production, despite having started life as a mid-size car. For a few months in 2004, Dacia offered three different small sedan models simultaneously.

The model scored solid sales numbers right up to its last day of production, mainly due to its low price, value for money, and easy and inexpensive maintenance. The sedan ("Berlina") and the estate ("Break") had €4,100 and €4,250 price tags respectively in 2004. The Liberta liftback had been dropped in 1996, but production of the sedan and estate was over in 2004. The "Pick-Up" range ended production in December 2006. The Dacia Logan replaced the 1300/1310 model in 2004.

== Engines ==
Model	Engine Name	Power system:	Bore × stroke:	Compression ratio:	Power	Torque	0–100 km/h:	Top speed
Petrol:
1210	1.2 L (1,185 cc) OHV I4	carburetor	70,00 mm × 77,00 mm	8.5:1	48 hp (35 kW) at 5300 rpm	80 N⋅m at 3000 rpm	n/a	135 km/h
1310p	1.3 L (1,289 cc) OHV Renault 810 I4	carburetor	73.00 mm × 77.00 mm	8.5:1	54 hp (40 kW) at 5250 rpm	89 N⋅m at 3000 rpm	18.0 s	140 km/h
1310	1.3 L (1,289 cc) OHV Renault 810 I4	carburetor	73.00 mm × 77.00 mm	8.5:1	56 hp (41 kW) at 5300 rpm	92 N⋅m at 3000 rpm	17.1 s	140 km/h
1310 1.4	1.4 L (1,397 cc) OHV Dacia 102 I4	carburetor	76.00 mm × 77.00 mm	9.0:1	63 hp (46 kW) at 5250 rpm	100 N⋅m at 3000 rpm	n/a	142 km/h
1310 1.4i	1.4 L (1,397 cc) OHV Dacia 102 I4	fuel injection	76.00 mm × 77.00 mm	9.2:1	60 hp (44 kW) at 5000 rpm	97 N⋅m at 3500 rpm	n/a	143 km/h
1310 1.6	1.6 L (1,557 cc) OHV Dacia 106 I4	carburetor	77.00 mm × 83.60 mm	9.25:1	72 hp (53 kW) at 5250 rpm	123 N⋅m at 3000 rpm	n/a	150 km/h
1310 1.6i	1.6 L (1,557 cc) OHV Dacia 106 I4	fuel injection	77.00 mm × 83.60 mm	9.2:1	68 hp (50 kW) at 5000 rpm	116 N⋅m at 2500 rpm	n/a	146 km/h
1400	1.4 L (1,397 cc) OHV Dacia 102 I4	carburetor	76.00 mm × 77.00 mm	9.2:1	65 hp (48 kW) at 5500 rpm	100 N⋅m at 3300 rpm	n/a	150 km/h
1410	1.4 L (1,397 cc) OHV Dacia 102 I4	carburetor	76.00 mm × 77.00 mm	9.5:1	65 hp (48 kW) at 5500 rpm	100 N⋅m at 3300 rpm	n/a	150 km/h
1410	1.4 L (1,397 cc) OHV Dacia 102 I4	carburetor	76.00 mm × 77.00 mm	9.0:1	62 hp (46 kW) at 5000 rpm	100 N⋅m at 3300 rpm	n/a	150 km/h

== Pre-facelift ==
Dacia 1310/1410
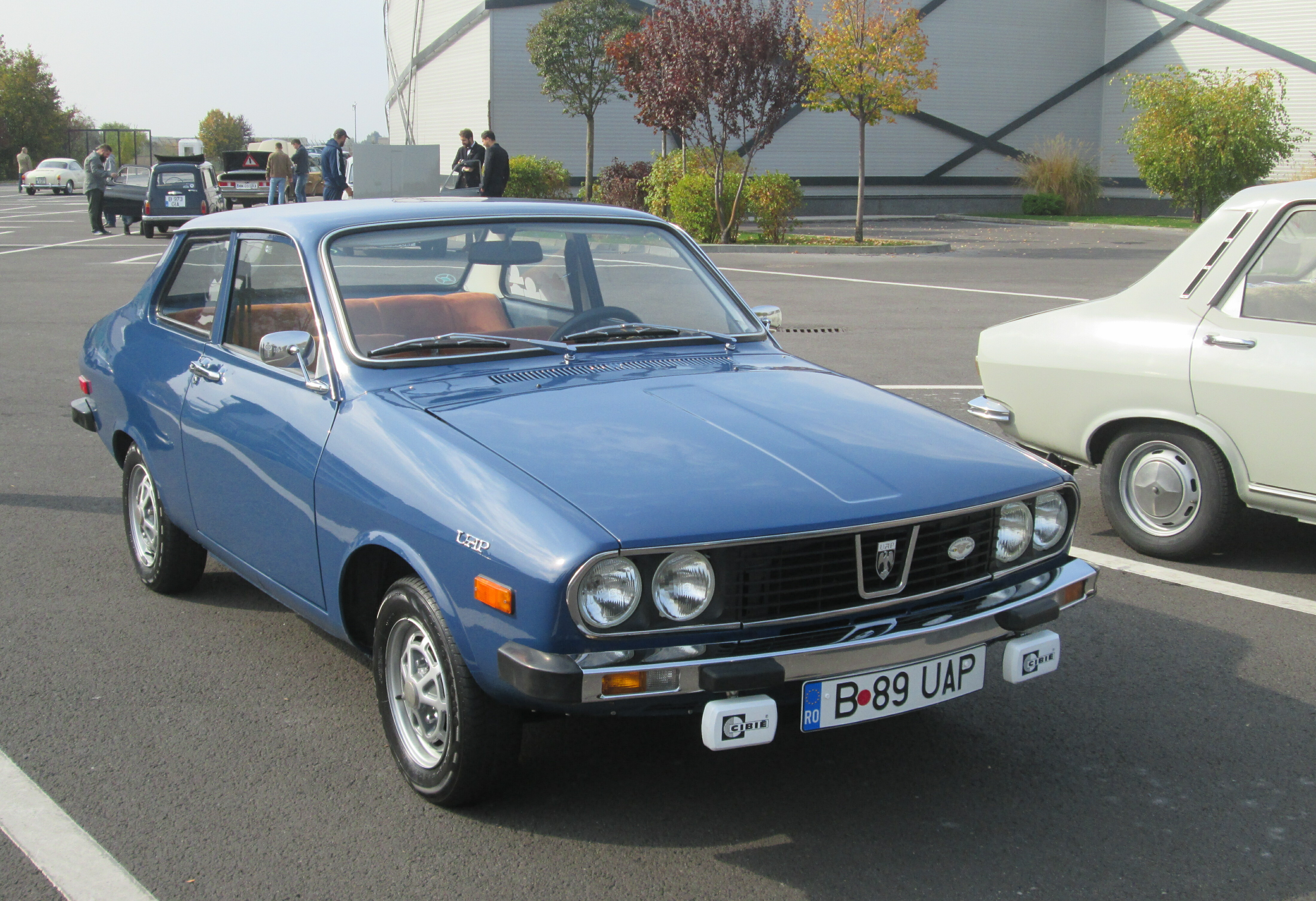
- 1989 Dacia 1410 Sport in Bucharest, Romania.

Overview
- Manufacturer: Dacia
- Production: 1979–1984
- Assembly: Romania: Mioveni; Romania: Ștefănești, Argeș (coupe only)
- Designer: I.A. Pitești

Body and chassis
- Class: Small family car (C)
- Body style: 4-door saloon 5-door estate 2-door coupé
- Layout: Front-engine, front-wheel-drive
- Platform: Renault 12
- Related: Dacia 1300; Dacia 1320; Dacia 1325; Dacia Pick-Up

Powertrain
- Engine: 1289 cc I4; 1397 cc I4
- Transmission: 4-speed manual

Dimensions
- Wheelbase: 2,441 mm (96.1 in)
- Length: 4,348 mm (171.2 in) (saloon); 4,404 mm (173.4 in) (estate); 4,148 mm (163.3 in) (coupé)
- Width: 1,636 mm (64.4 in)
- Height: 1,355 mm (53.3 in) (saloon); 1,455 mm (57.3 in) (estate); 1,250 mm (49.2 in) (coupé)
- Curb weight: 940 kg (2,072 lb) (saloon); 960 kg (2,116 lb) (estate); 880 kg (1,940 lb) (coupé)

Chronology
- Predecessor: Dacia 1300

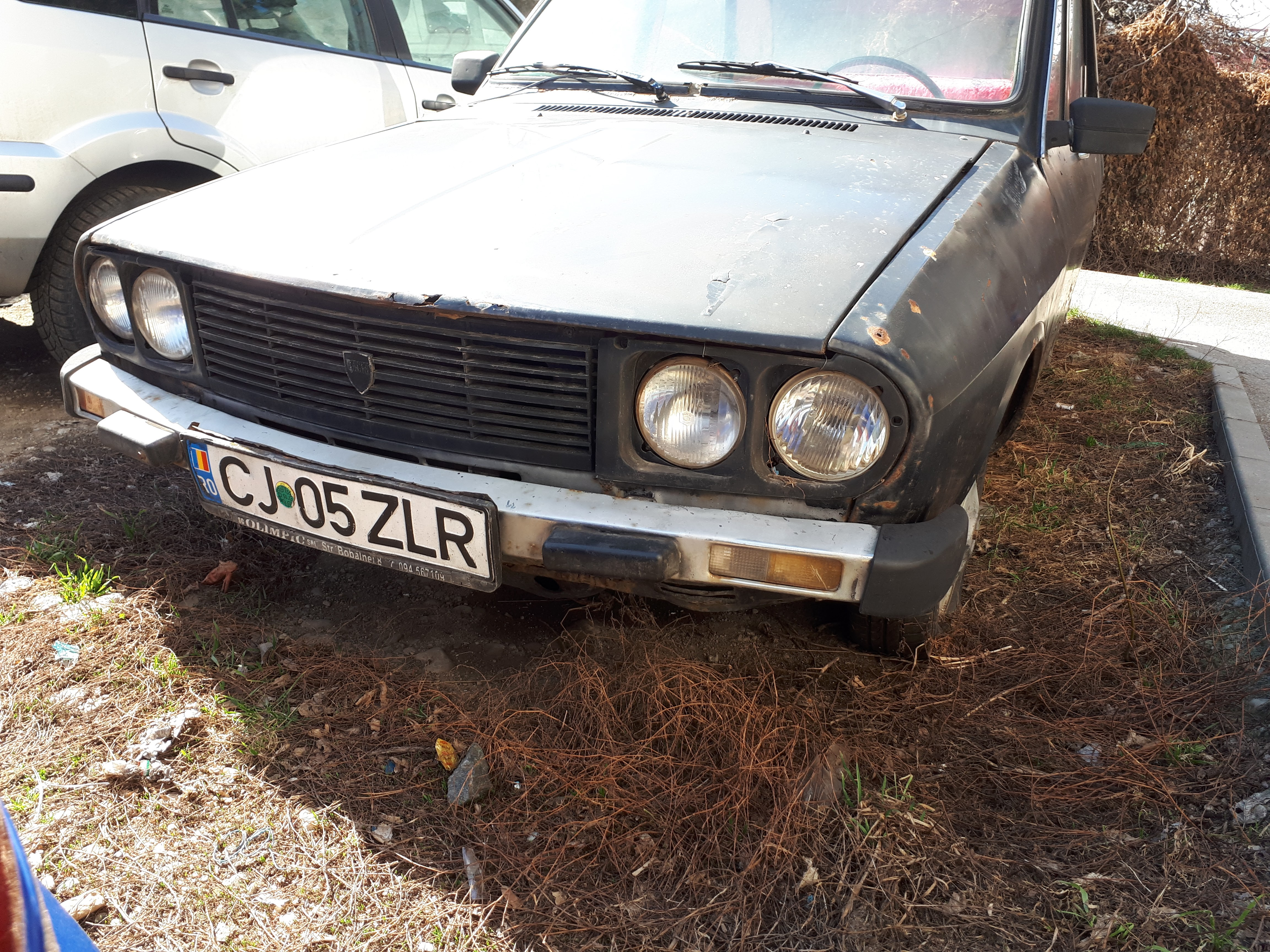

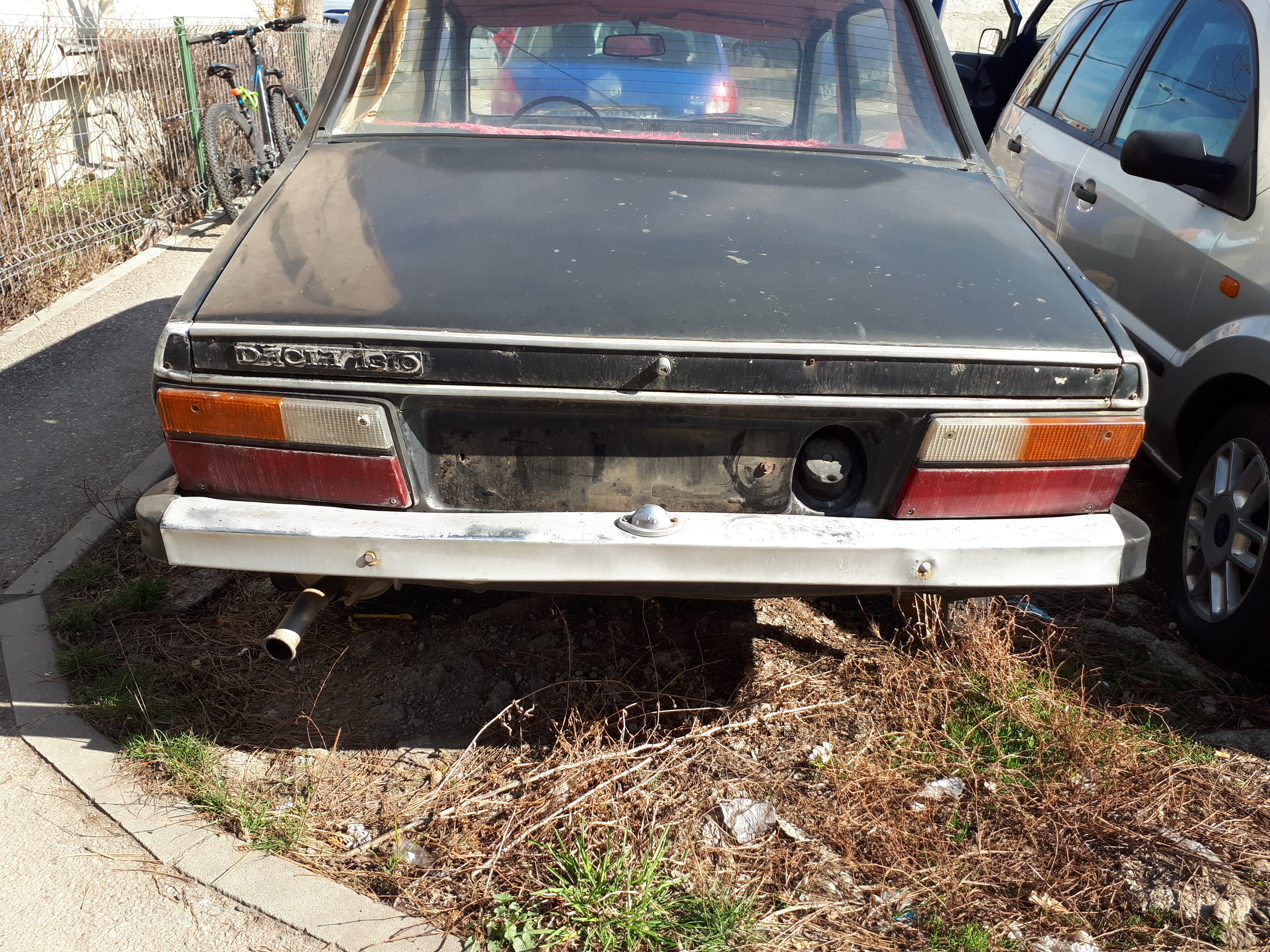
Dacia 1310 (saloon; 1979–1984)

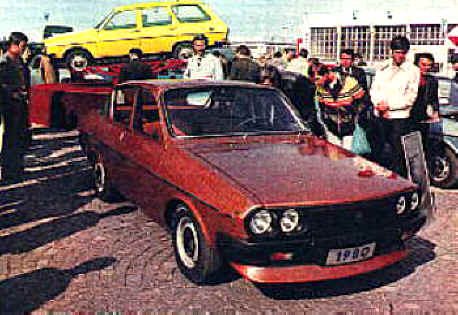
Dacia Brașovia, the prototype that preceded the Dacia 1410 Sport (1979)

After the manufacturing license to produce the Dacia 1300 (based on the Renault 12) expired in 1978, the first major restyling took place, and the new model was renamed Dacia 1310. It was presented for the first time in the fall of 1979 at the National Exhibition of Economic Achievements (EREN), held in Bucharest, being designated as the "1980 model".

It brought both interior and exterior changes. The front of the model was completely redesigned, and it now had a front fascia with a new shape, four round headlights, and higher bumpers that incorporated turn signals. At the rear, the two lamps now combined the taillights, turn signals, brake and reverse in a single block, and some restyling was also done to the trunk.

The new model had a radio, rear-view mirror, electric windshield washer, dual-circuit brakes (power brakes on some models), exterior and right-hand mirrors (on some models) and seats with headrests, and the space for rear passengers was increased by 8 cm.

At the technical level, the model also had a number of improvements, such as an electric fan operated by a thermal relay, an economizer, and a hot air filter outlet. The compression ratio of the engine was changed from 8.5:1 to 9:1, which together with the other improvements led to an increase in engine power and a decrease in fuel consumption. The 1,289 cc engine had a maximum power of 56 horsepower (compared to 55.2) at 5,250 rpm, and the maximum torque was 94 Nm at 3,500 rpm. This model had over 56 improvements and was seen as a transition model to a city car of exclusively Romanian design, which was to be launched three years later.

In the first half of 1983, the 1410 Sport coupe was put on sale, presented for the first time in 1979 at EREN and in production from 1981. It was manufactured at the Dacia service center in Brașov, being initially exhibited under the name of Brașovia. The wheelbase and length of the model were about 200 mm shorter, the height was about 135 mm lower, but the trunk volume remained unchanged. The 1410 Sport's engine had a displacement of 1,397 cc (bore x stroke: 76x77 mm) and produced 65 hp (48 kW) at 5,250 rpm, thanks to an increase in the engine bore (from 73 to 76 mm), higher compression (at 9.8:1) and a new carburetor. Reducing the height of the rear suspension lowered the Sport's center of gravity, but it is considered to have negatively affected its stability on the go.

The fuel consumption of the 1410 Sport at 80 km/h was 7.0 liters per 100 kilometers, the 0 to 100 km/h time was 16.2 seconds, and the maximum speed was about 152–154 km/h.

Between 1980 and 1984, diesel engines were tested, and models equipped with such engines were presented, but they never reached the series production stage.

=== Dacia Sport ===
The Dacia Sport entered production in 1983, following the unveiling of the Dacia Sport-Brașovia prototype in 1979, in two models: the Dacia Sport 1310 with a 1289 cc engine and 54 hp and the Dacia Sport 1410 with a 1397 cc engine and 65 hp. Between 1981 and 1985, the Sport had shorter doors, and from 1986 until 1992, the doors were lengthened. From 1983, only the 1397 cc 65 hp engine was offered, and from 1985 a 5-speed gearbox was available. Dacia Sport models with an engine of 1580 cc and 84 hp with overhead cam, as well as a more powerful version producing about 100 hp, but these engines did not reach mass production.

The model was popular not only with youth, but with drivers in Romanian car competitions of the time (Dacia Sport's share in the national rally championship reached almost 20%). The Dacia Sport was produced in 5,500 copies, during a period of just over a decade. However, the sales of this model were low, due to the high price, common manufacturing defects, and design problems (insufficient interior space, unusable trunk). Production was ended because various second-hand sports cars entered the Romanian market in the 1990s, making the sporting Dacia uncompetitive.

== 1984 facelift ==
Dacia 1310
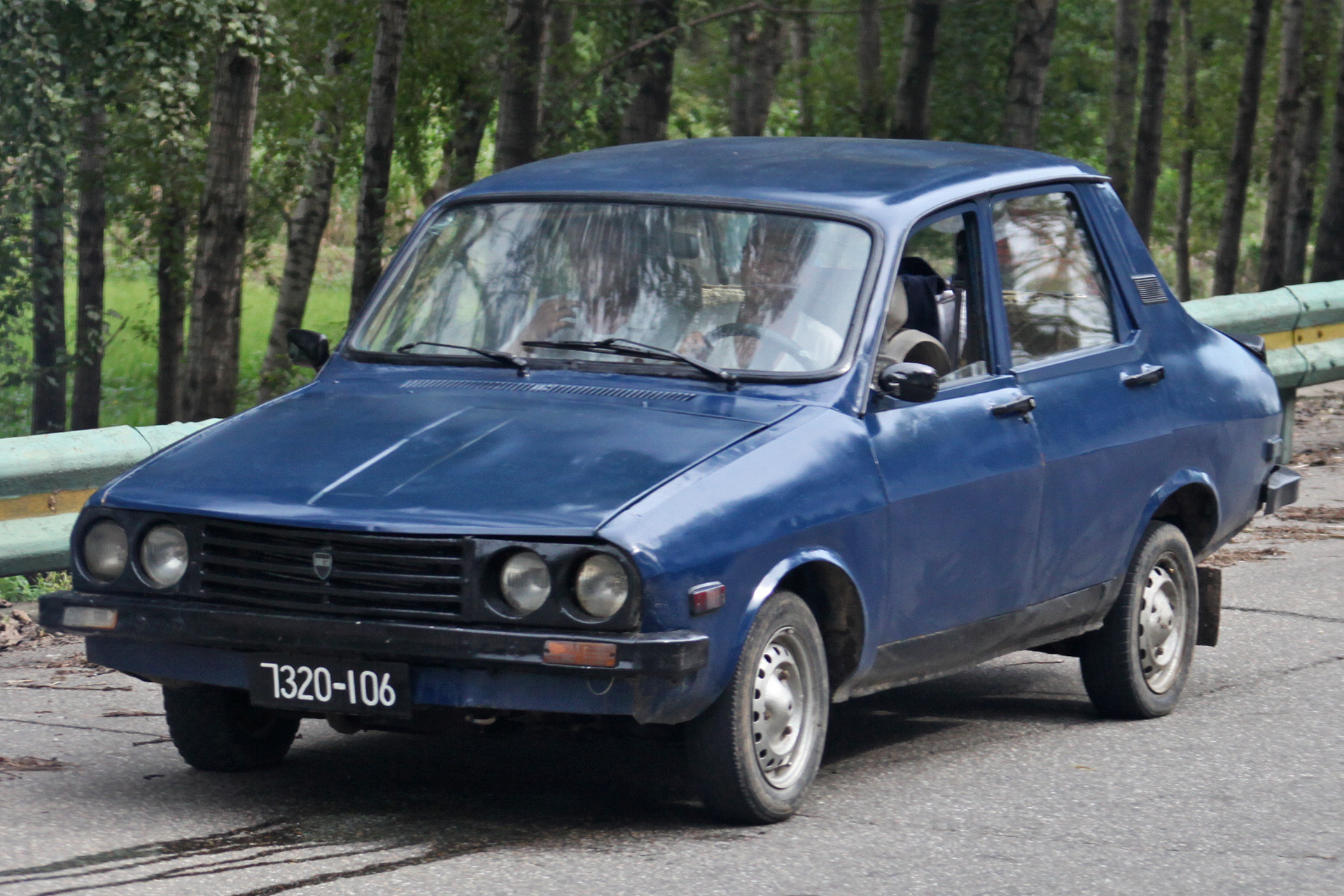
- Dacia 1310 in North Korea

Overview
- Manufacturer: Dacia
- Also called: Dacia 1320 (hatchback)
- Production: 1984–1990
- Assembly: Romania: Mioveni, Argeș; Romania: Ștefănești, Argeș (coupé only)
- Designer: I.A. Pitești

Body and chassis
- Class: Small family car (C)
- Body style: 4-door saloon 5-door estate 5-door hatchback 2-door coupé
- Layout: Front-engine, front-wheel-drive
- Platform: Renault 12

Powertrain
- Engine: Petrol: 1.2 L I4; 1.3 L I4; 1.4 L I4; 1.6 L I4
- Transmission: 4-speed / 5-speed manual

Dimensions
- Wheelbase: 2,441 mm (96.1 in)
- Length: 4,348 mm (171.2 in) (saloon); 4,404 mm (173.4 in) (estate); 4,397 mm (173.1 in) (hatchback); 4,148 mm (163.3 in) (coupé)
- Width: 1,636 mm (64.4 in)
- Height: 1,355 mm (53.3 in) (saloon); 1,455 mm (57.3 in) (estate); 1,437 mm (56.6 in) (hatchback); 1,250 mm (49.2 in) (coupé)
- Curb weight: 940 kg (2,072 lb) (saloon); 960 kg (2,116 lb) (estate); 920 kg (2,028 lb) (hatchback); 880 kg (1,940 lb) (coupé)

Chronology
- Successor: Dacia 1325 (hatchback)

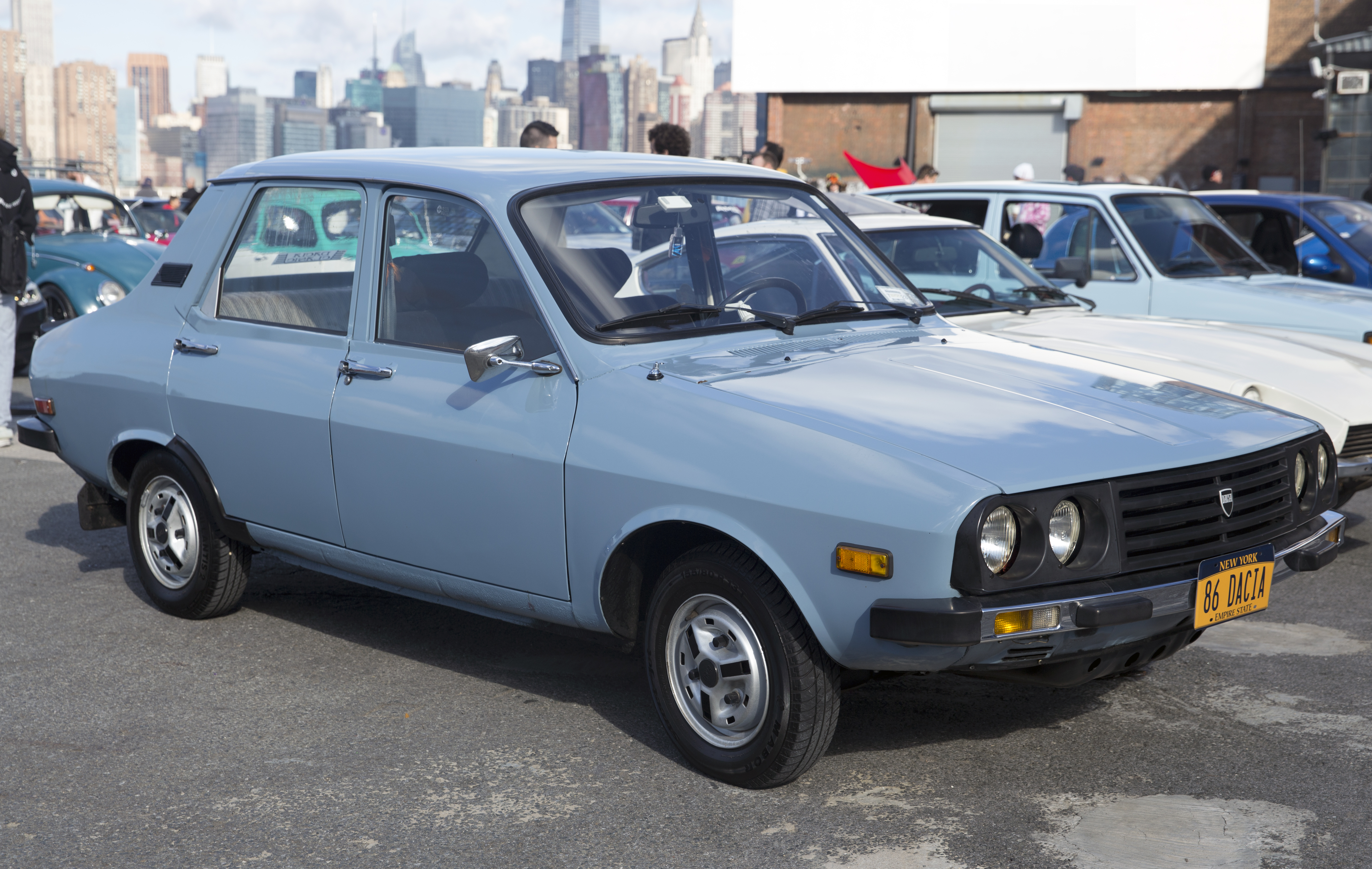

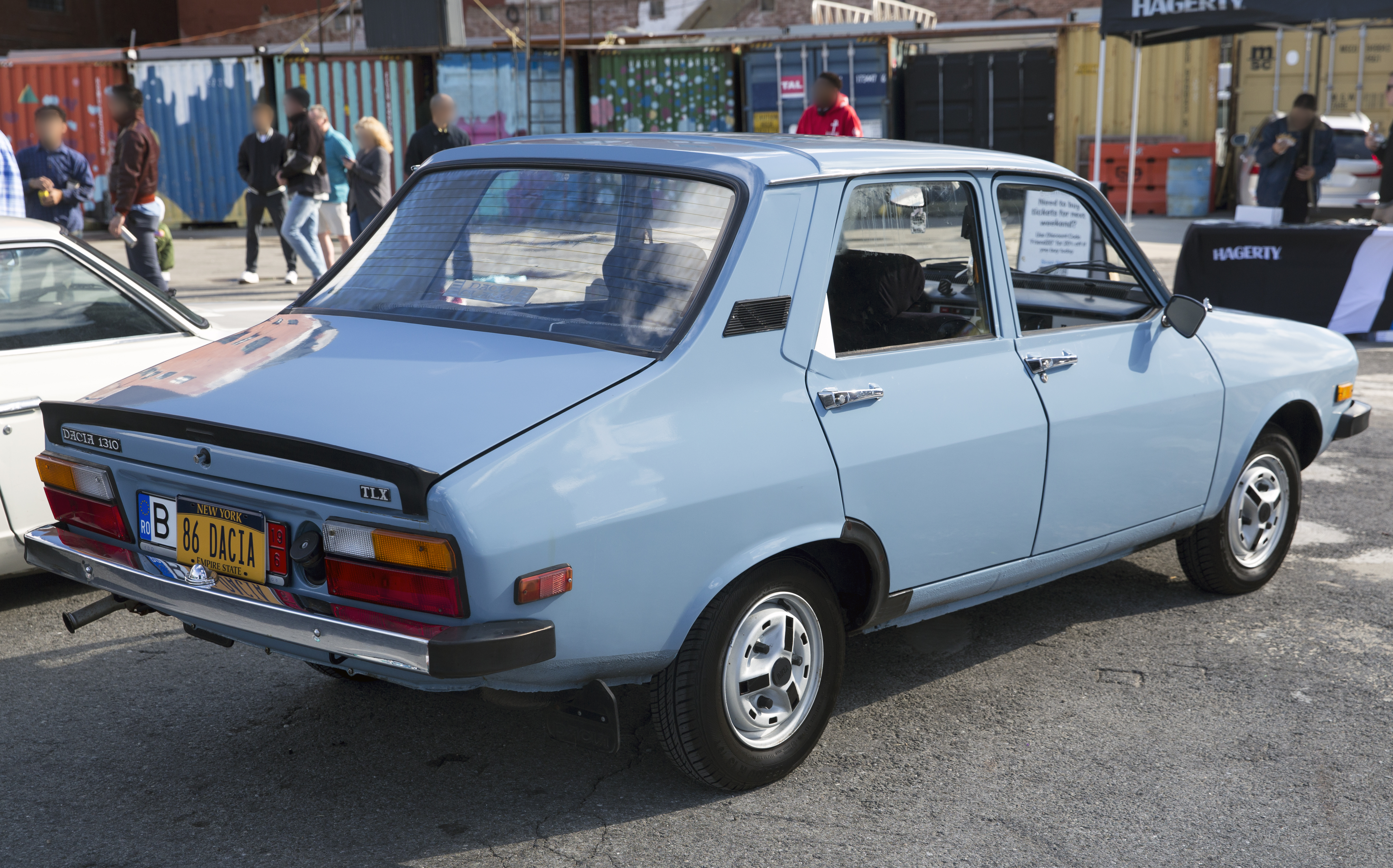
Dacia 1310 TLX (saloon; 1986)

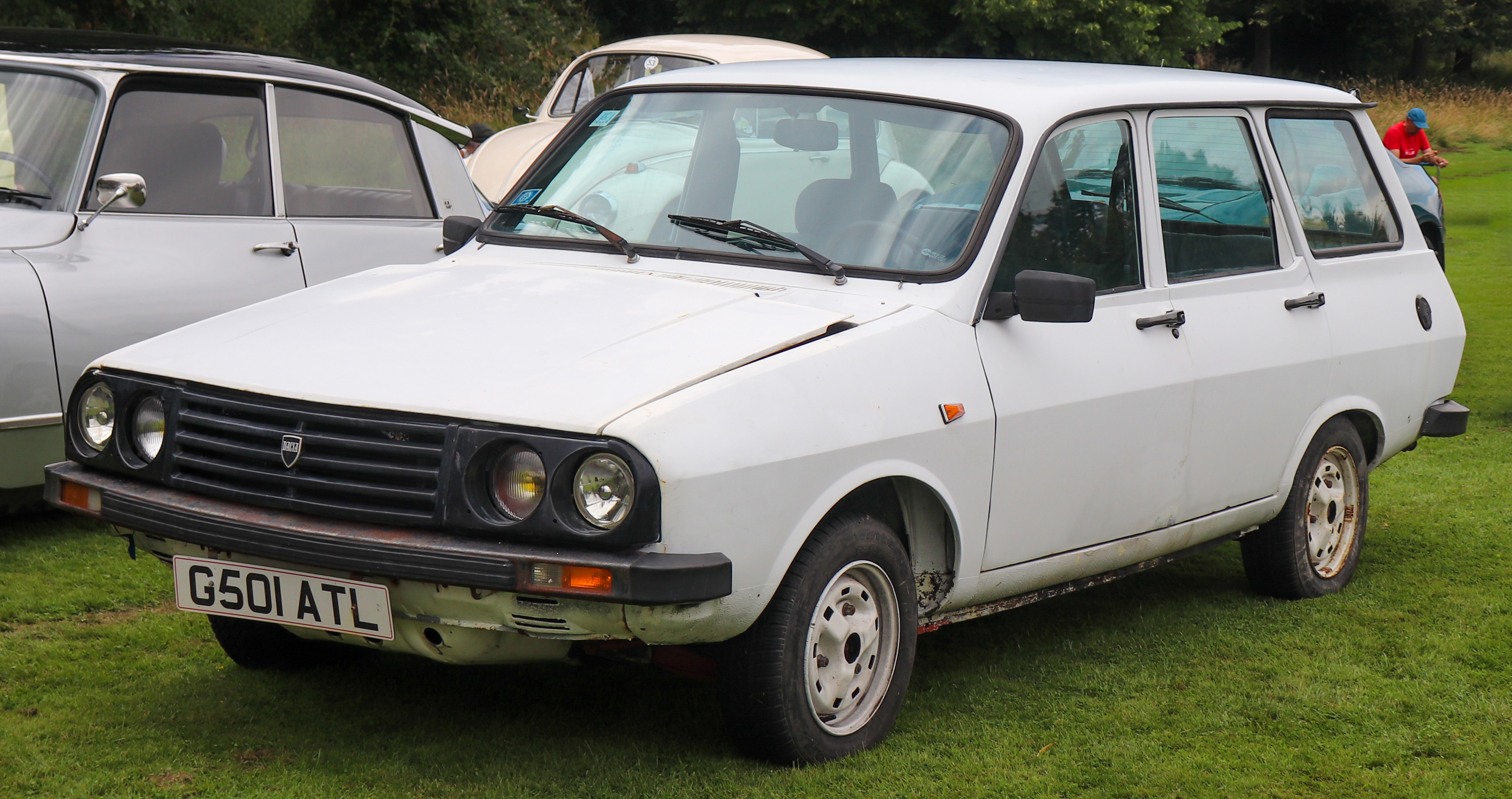

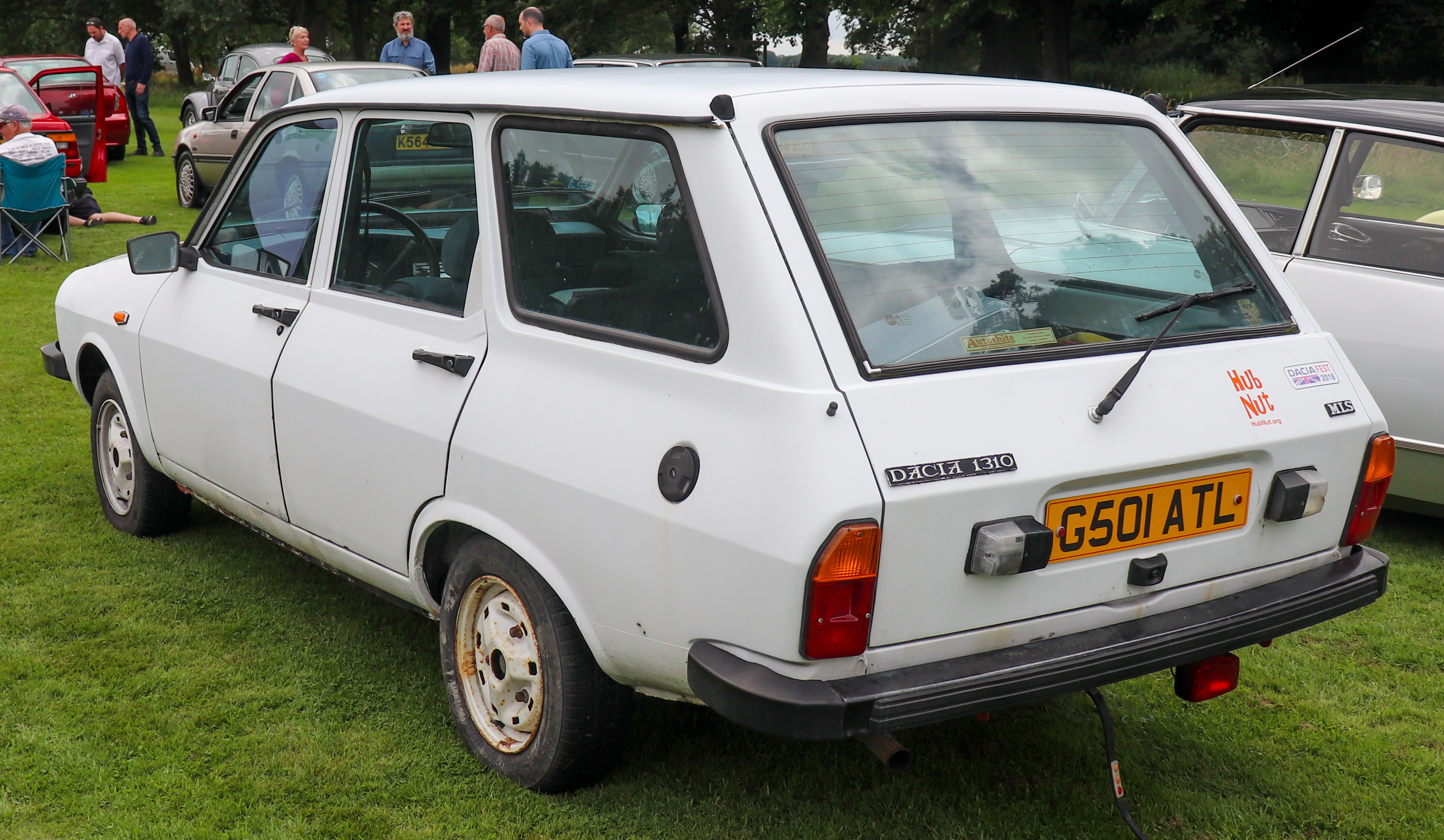
Dacia 1310 MLS (estate; 1990)

The "model 1984" car was presented at the Bucharest International Fair (TIB) in October 1983. It was equipped with a 1,397 cc engine, with a maximum power of 64 horsepower at 5,000 rpm and maximum torque, 103 Nm at 3,000 rpm, taken from the Dacia Sport. There was also a 57-horsepower variant. Fuel consumption was 6.1-6.4 liters per 100 kilometers, at a constant speed of 90 km/h. Sometimes this model was also called the Dacia 1410, a name used less often, because the variants of 1200, 1400 and 1600 cc all carried the "Dacia 1310" name. In 1985, a 5-speed gearbox was launched.

At the aesthetic level, there were some new changes to the body: a trunk spoiler, a new front grille, restyled headlight trim and much more. This model had two trim levels: TL and TLE, the first being equipped with a four-speed gearbox, and the second with a five-speed gearbox. The TLE trim was intended almost exclusively for export. The TL trim was equipped with a radio, while the TLE model came with a radio/cassette player and the dashboard had integrated indicators for water temperature and oil pressure.

A prototype was also presented with a diesel engine of 1.6 litres, with 54 hp (40 kW) and 101 N⋅m (74 lb⋅ft) of torque. With this engine, the car could reach a speed of 140 km/h (87 mph).

For the 1985 model year, a new 1,575 cc, overhead camshaft engine was shown, with maximum power of 80 hp (59 kW) at 5,000 rpm, maximum torque of 133 N⋅m (98 lb⋅ft) at 3,000 rpm. This was also fitted with a five-speed gearbox. However this engine was never put into series production. The dashboard was now completely redesigned, with trip odometer, buttons for adjusting the position of the headlights and timing the operation of the wipers, brake fluid level indicator, radio cassette player, new door panels with integrated speakers, and new seats with headrests. The rear seats were now equipped with seat belts.

Since 1985, the station wagon model could also be bought by private individuals. The model range now consisted of eight trim levels: MS, MLS, S, TL, TX, TLX and TLE. The standard sedan model now had the 1,289 cc engine, four-speed gearbox, 155 R13 wheels with 155-13 TT tires, vertical grille and headlights, rear deck trim, chrome door handles with built-in buttons and lock, left exterior mirror, one-speed air conditioning fan, two-spoke steering wheel, grab handles, electrically operated windshield washer, parking brake warning light, and round headlights. The MS trim had the following differences: inclined grille and headlights, rear deck spoiler, four-spoke steering wheel, heated rear window, front-rear side position lamps, windshield wiper timer. The MLS trim had the following upgrades: double braking circuit, brake fluid level indicator, restyled wheels, plastic front spoiler, front seat headrest, oil pressure and water temperature indicators. The S trim had, among other things, the following differences: three-point fixed radiator, mirror protector, three-position side interior lamps, interior headlight adjustment control. The TL trim had the following differences: 155-13 TM tires, two-speed air conditioning fan. The top TLE trim had the following features: 1,397 cc engine, five-speed gearbox, fuel tank filter, power brakes, pipe engine shield, black chrome door handles with separate lock, additional rear door lock, vertical fuel tank, restyled gearbox lever, restyled seats, carpeted trunk, front door storage boxes and side lamps for the number plate.

There was also the 1210 model, which was equipped with a 1,185 cc engine (bore x stroke: 70x77 mm), with a maximum power of 48 hp (35 kW) at 5,300 rpm, maximum torque of 80 N⋅m (59 lb⋅ft) at 3,000 rpm and compression ratio of 8.5:1.

=== Dacia 1320 ===
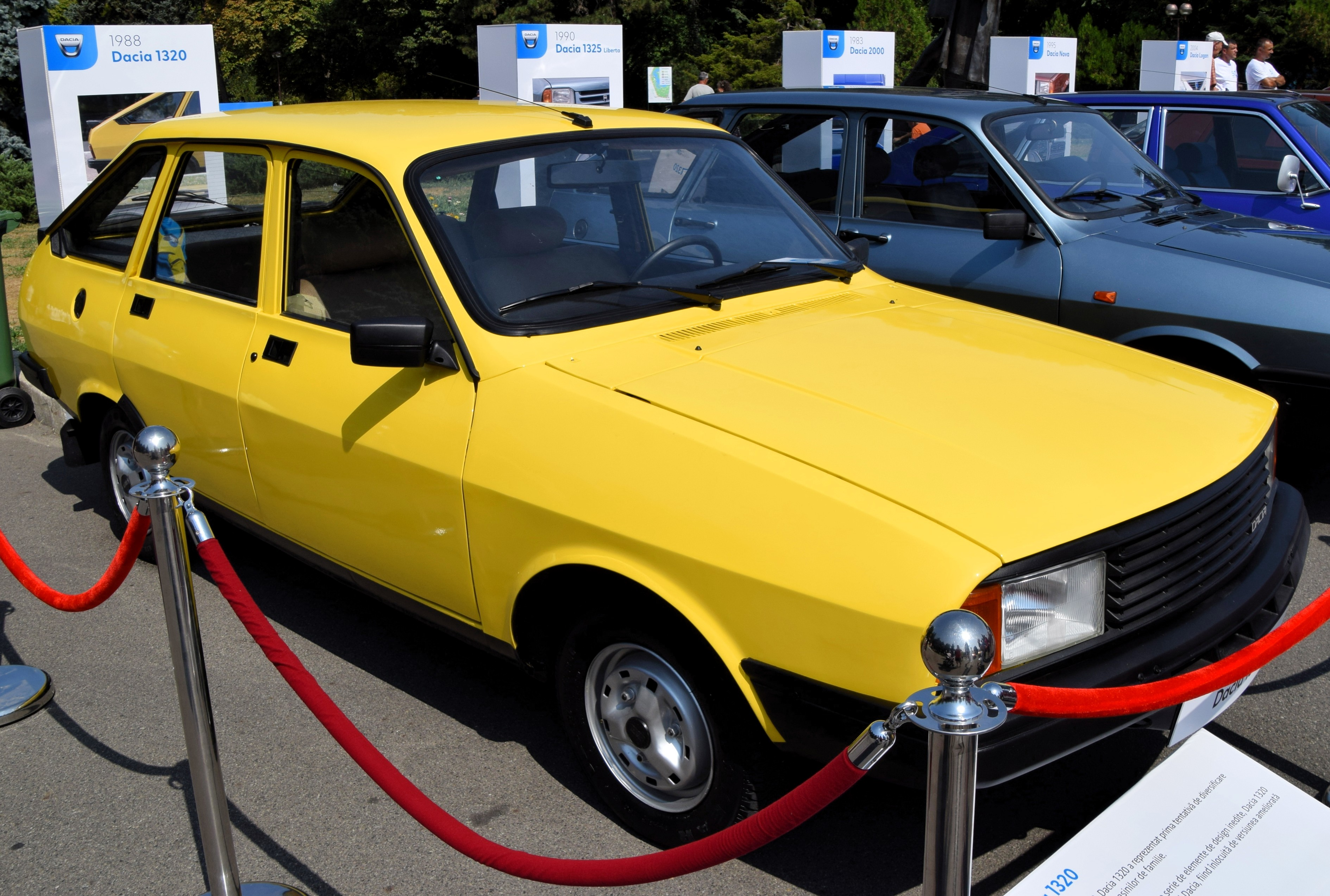
Dacia 1320 (hatchback; 1987–1990)

In 1987, the Dacia 1320 was launched, a hatchback inspired by the locally assembled Dacia 2000 and derived from the 1310 model. It was equipped with either a 1300 cc or a 1400 cc engine and a manual gearbox with 4 or 5 gears. The grille was completely redesigned, with the double round headlights being replaced with single rectangular headlights. The 1320 received a much improved dashboard that was later used in the third generation Dacia 1310. The exterior door handles were also replaced by flush fitting ones, and the interior handles were redesigned - the door now opening by pulling the door handle inwards, as in most modern cars. Each door could be locked and unlocked from the inside, from the buttons located just below the opening handles. The 1320 kept the 1310's taillights, and unlike the later 1325 it did not get a rear windshield wiper.

The front design was called "CN1", standing for Concepția Noastră 1, which translates to "our creation 1". It was replaced by Dacia 1325 Liberta in the early 1990s. The 1320 was sold in 2,567 units; most were used as taxis due to low sales, with Dacia trying to eke out profitability.

== 1991 facelift (CN1) ==
Dacia 1310
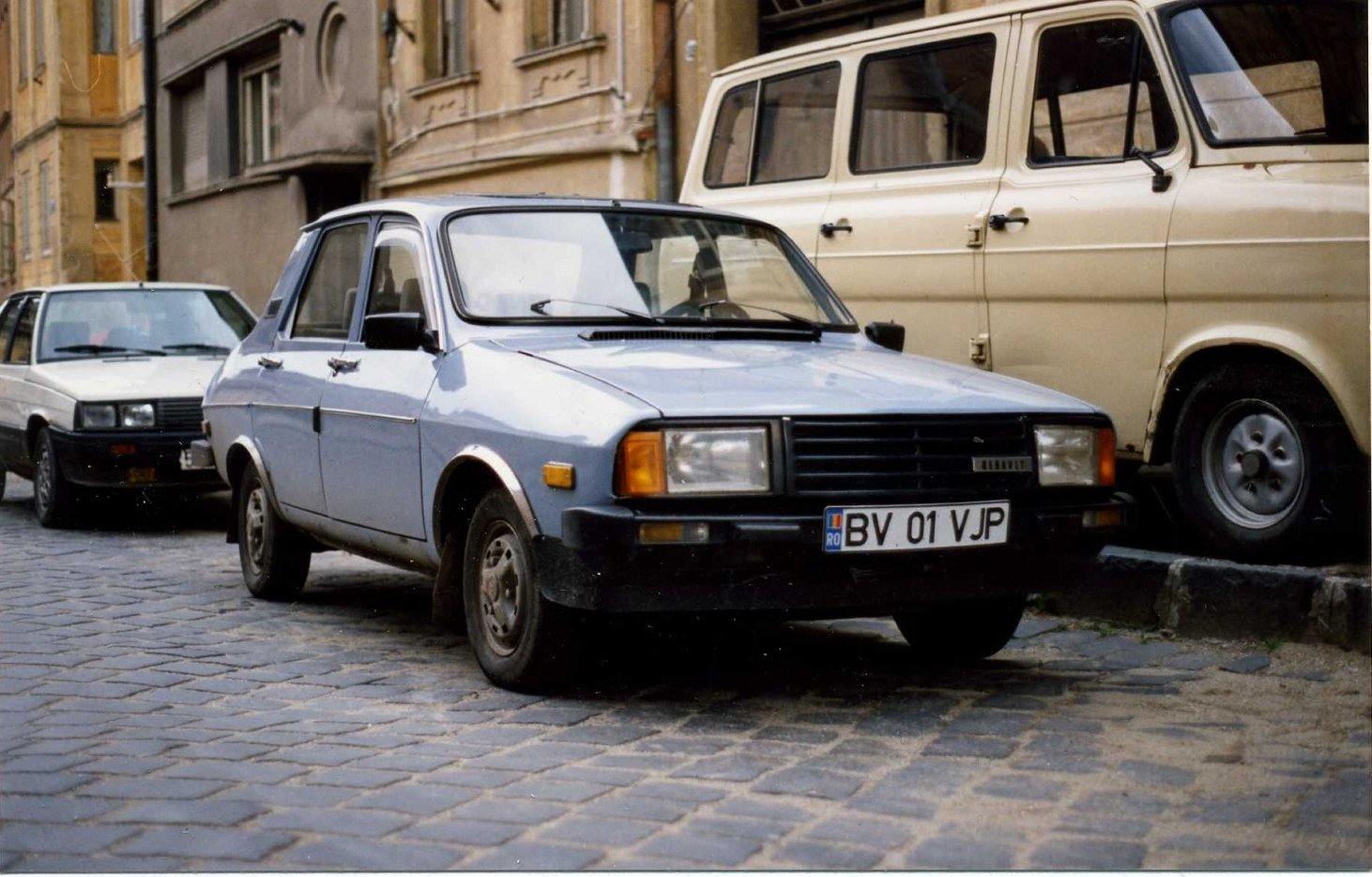

Overview
- Manufacturer: Dacia
- Also called: Dacia 1325 Liberta (for hatchback)
- Production: 1991–1994
- Assembly: Romania: Mioveni
- Designer: I.A. Pitești

Body and chassis
- Class: Small family car (C)
- Body style: 4-door saloon 5-door estate 5-door hatchback
- Layout: Front-engine, front-wheel-drive
- Platform: Renault 12
- Related: Dacia 1300; Dacia 1320; Dacia 1325; Dacia Pick-Up

Powertrain
- Engine: Petrol: 1.3 L I4; 1.4 L I4; 1.6 L I4
- Transmission: 4-speed / 5-speed manual

Dimensions
- Wheelbase: 2,441 mm (96.1 in)
- Length: 4,348 mm (171.2 in) (saloon); 4,404 mm (173.4 in) (estate); 4,397 mm (173.1 in) (hatchback)
- Width: 1,636 mm (64.4 in)
- Height: 1,355 mm (53.3 in) (saloon); 1,455 mm (57.3 in) (estate); 1,430 mm (56.3 in) (hatchback)
- Curb weight: 940 kg (2,072 lb) (saloon); 960 kg (2,116 lb) (estate); 935 kg (2,061 lb) (hatchback)

Chronology
- Predecessor: Dacia 1320 (hatchback)

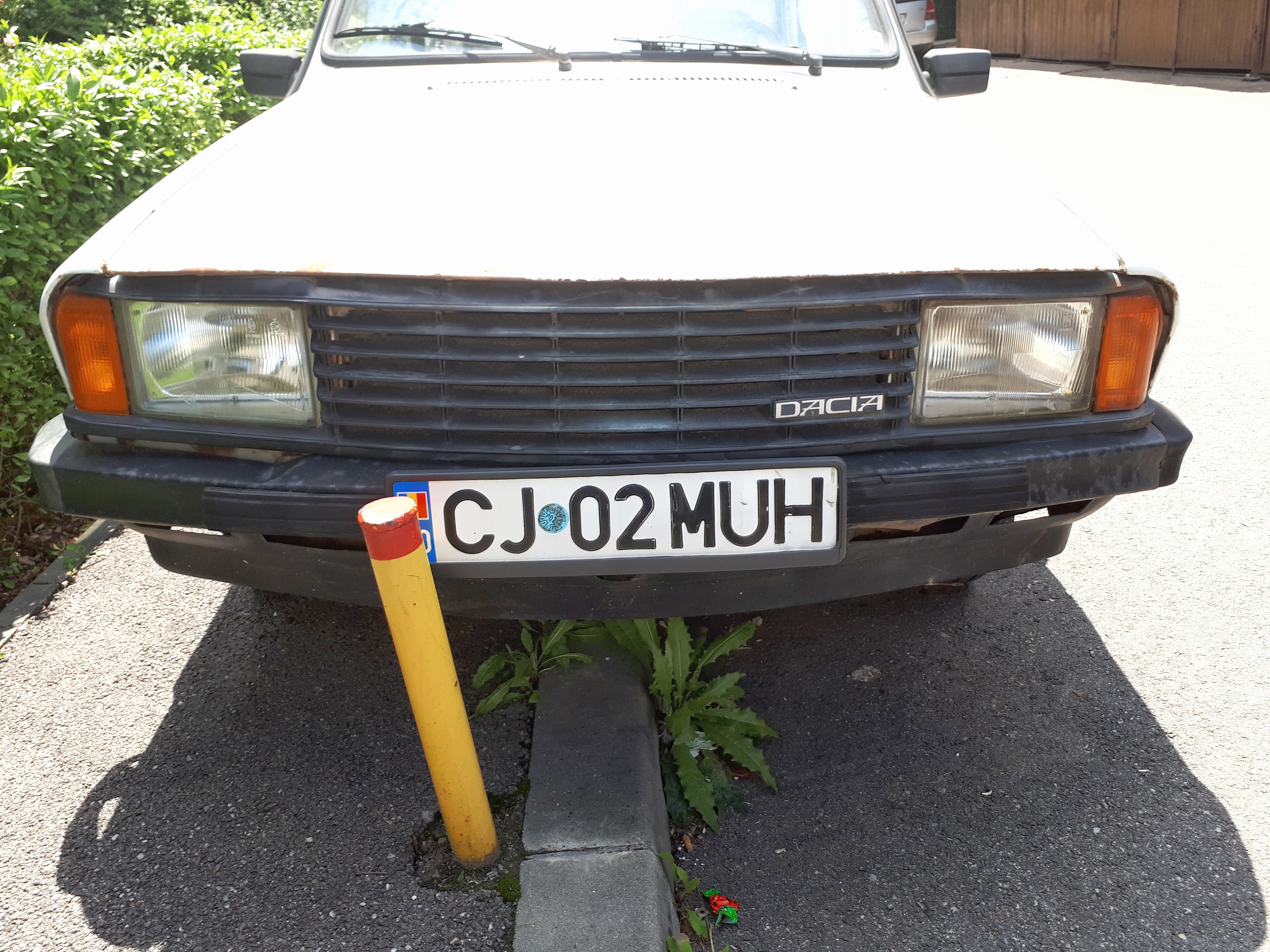

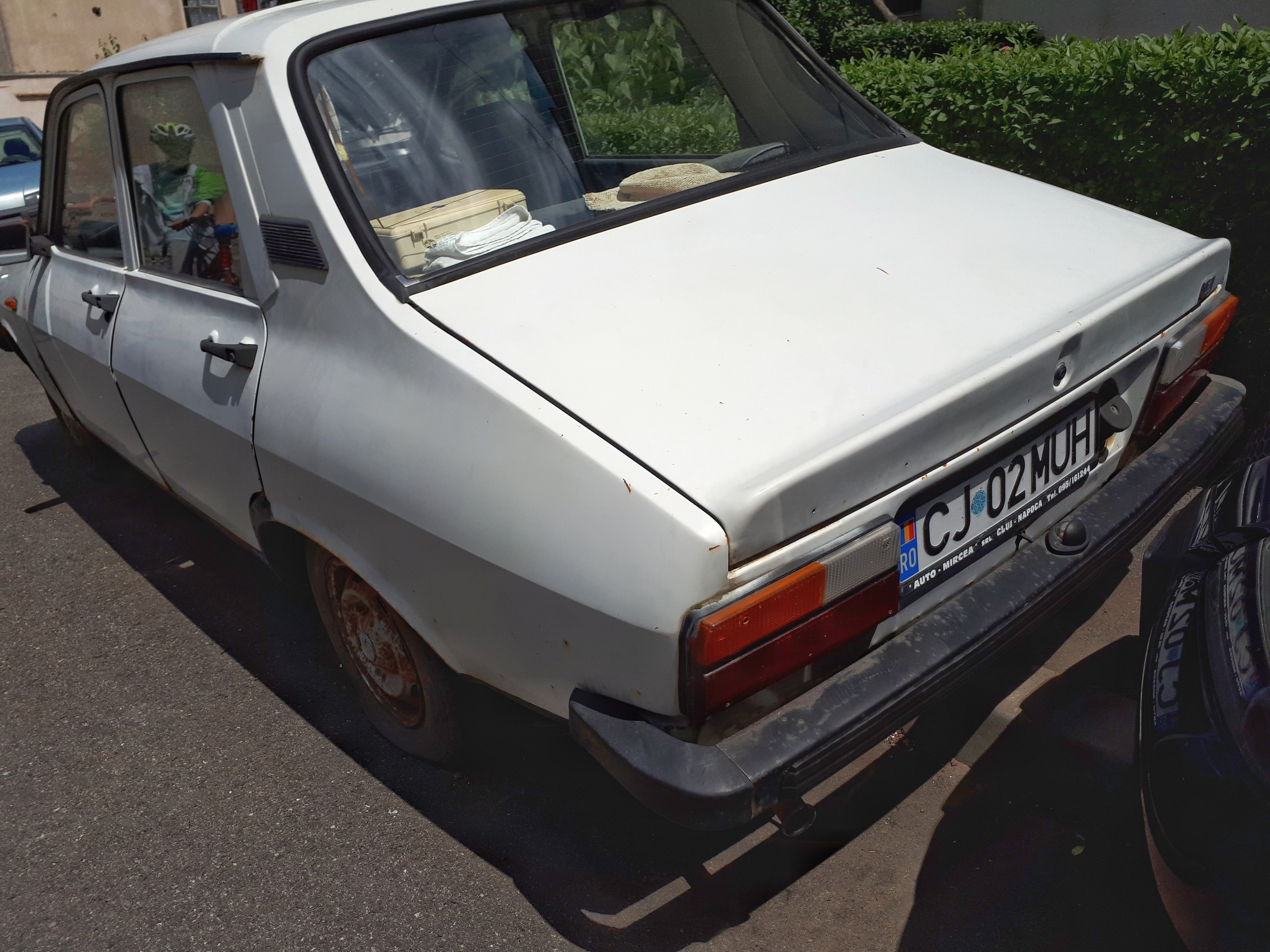
Dacia 1310 L (saloon; 1991–1994)

The third generation 1310 had its debut in 1991. It underwent a small restyling, including an updated front grille with 2 rectangular headlights taken from the Dacia 1320, a spoiler built into the boot lid, an element created by engineer Ion Romică Sandu in 1990 and which was used until the end of production, a dark gray dashboard equipped with 2 air intakes located at its edge, plastic bumpers, and the introduction of metallic colors. In 1992, the 1289 cc, 54 PS (40 kW) engine and the 4-speed gearbox were discontinued, while at the end of 1994, a 1557 cc engine with 73 PS (54 kW) was introduced. Both the Break, hatchback and pick-up variants underwent the same changes, except for the bootlid with the built-in spoiler. The Canadian-market model was discontinued as sales ended there. The 4-speed gearbox did remain available until 1997 on the 1.4-litre pick-up variant.

=== Dacia 1325 ===
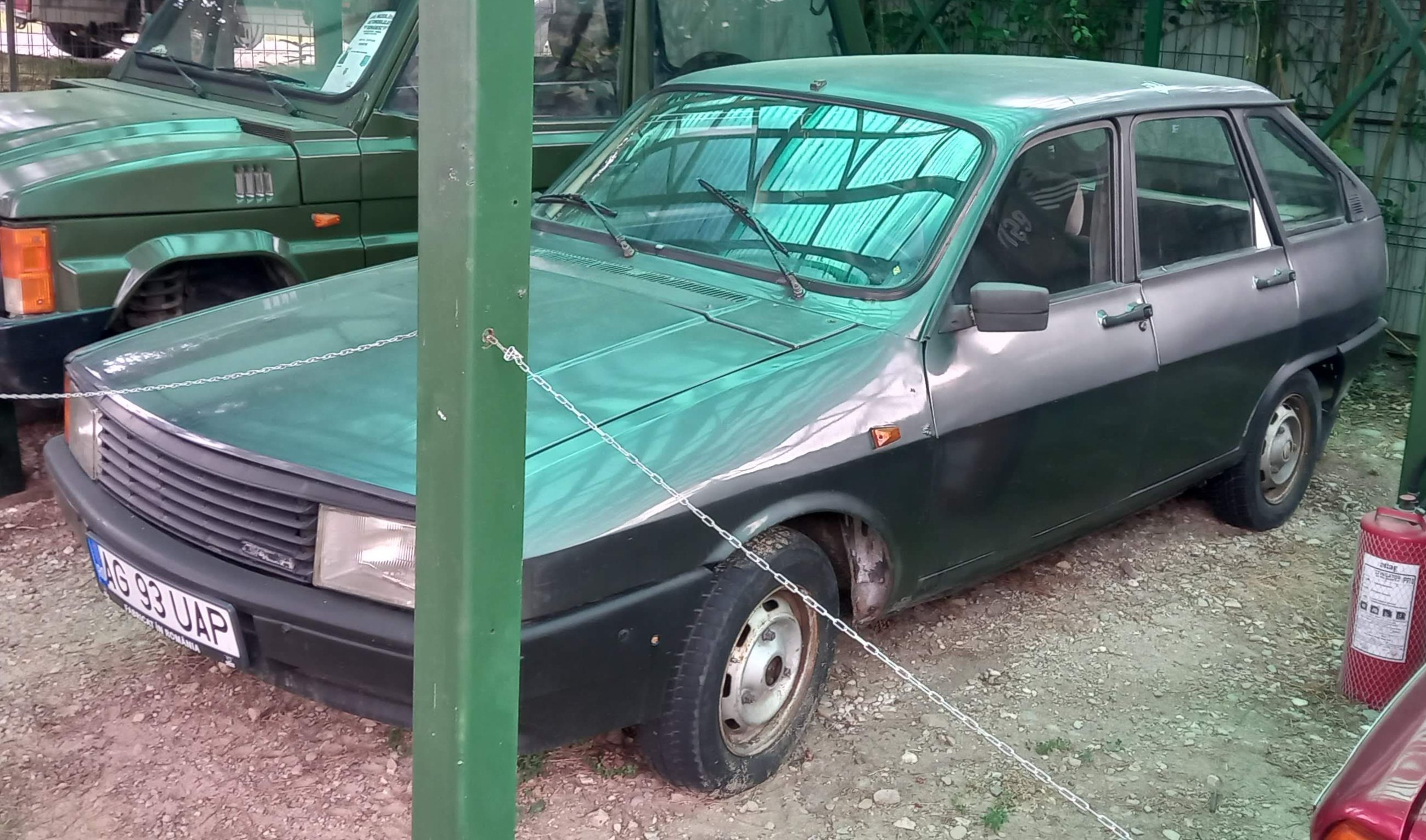
Dacia 1325 Liberta

Also during this period, the Dacia 1325 was launched. Also known as the 1325 Liberta or simply the Liberta, it replaced the old Dacia 1320 and came with a restyled rear.

== 1994 facelift (CN2/CN3) ==
Dacia 1310/1410
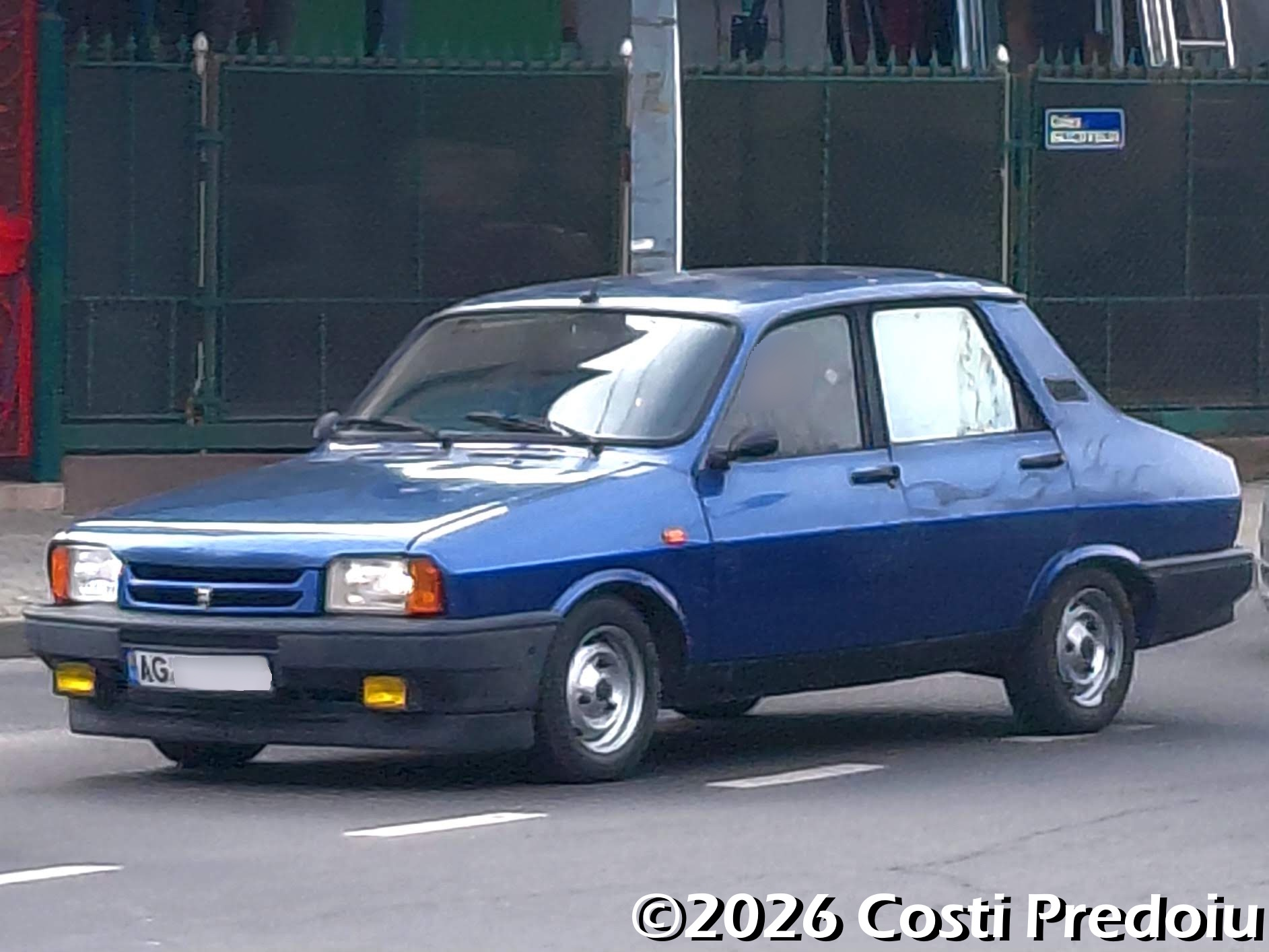
- 1994 Dacia 1410 (CN2) front view

Overview
- Manufacturer: Dacia
- Production: 1994–1999
- Assembly: Romania: Mioveni
- Designer: I.A. Pitești

Body and chassis
- Class: Small family car (C)
- Body style: 4-door saloon 5-door estate 5-door hatchback
- Layout: Front-engine, front-wheel-drive
- Platform: Renault 12
- Related: Dacia 1300; Dacia 1320; Dacia 1325; Dacia Pick-Up

Powertrain
- Engine: 1.3 L I4; 1.4 L I4; 1.6 L I4
- Transmission: 5-speed manual

Dimensions
- Wheelbase: 2,441 mm (96.1 in)
- Length: 4,348 mm (171.2 in) (saloon); 4,404 mm (173.4 in) (estate)
- Width: 1,636 mm (64.4 in)
- Height: 1,355 mm (53.3 in) (saloon); 1,455 mm (57.3 in) (estate)
- Curb weight: 940 kg (2,072 lb) (saloon); 960 kg (2,116 lb) (estate)

The CN1 was made until the middle of 1994, when another restyling took place, and the CN2 was launched in the summer of 1994. Unlike its predecessor CN1, it came with a redesigned hood and new headlights designed for it, a new grille and new plastic bumpers, available with or without fog lights, depending on the trim level. The highest trim level came with metallic paint, tinted windows, sunroof, and alloy wheels.

The CN2-series 1310 and 1410 were manufactured until June 1995 when they were replaced by the lightly altered CN3. This coincided with the launch of the Dacia Nova, and included 5.5Jx13 wheels. From then on, 165/70R13 tires were standard, although some 1557 cc models were equipped with 175/70R13 tires. At the end of 1998, the 1557 cc engine with fuel injection and 71 hp (52 kW) was introduced, taken from the Dacia Nova. In 1999, a 1.4 liter version with 60 hp (44 kW) and fuel injection was introduced. The following equipment levels were offered: L which meant a sedan with a 1400 cc engine, and T for a sedan with the 1600 cc engine. For the break variant, the notations CL and CT were adopted. Trim levels Li, Ti, CLi, CTi were used for variants with fuel injection.

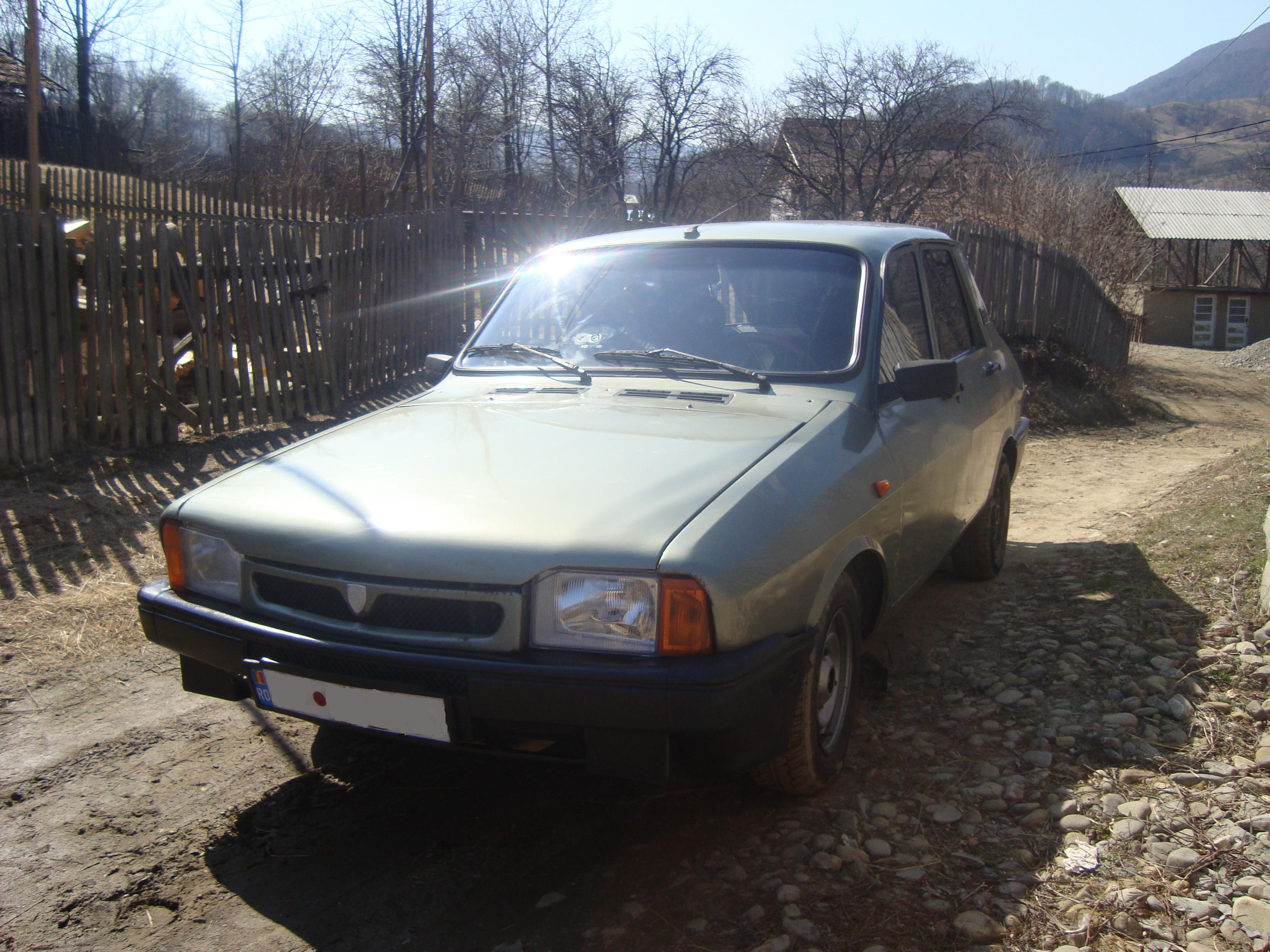
Dacia 1310 (saloon; 1996)

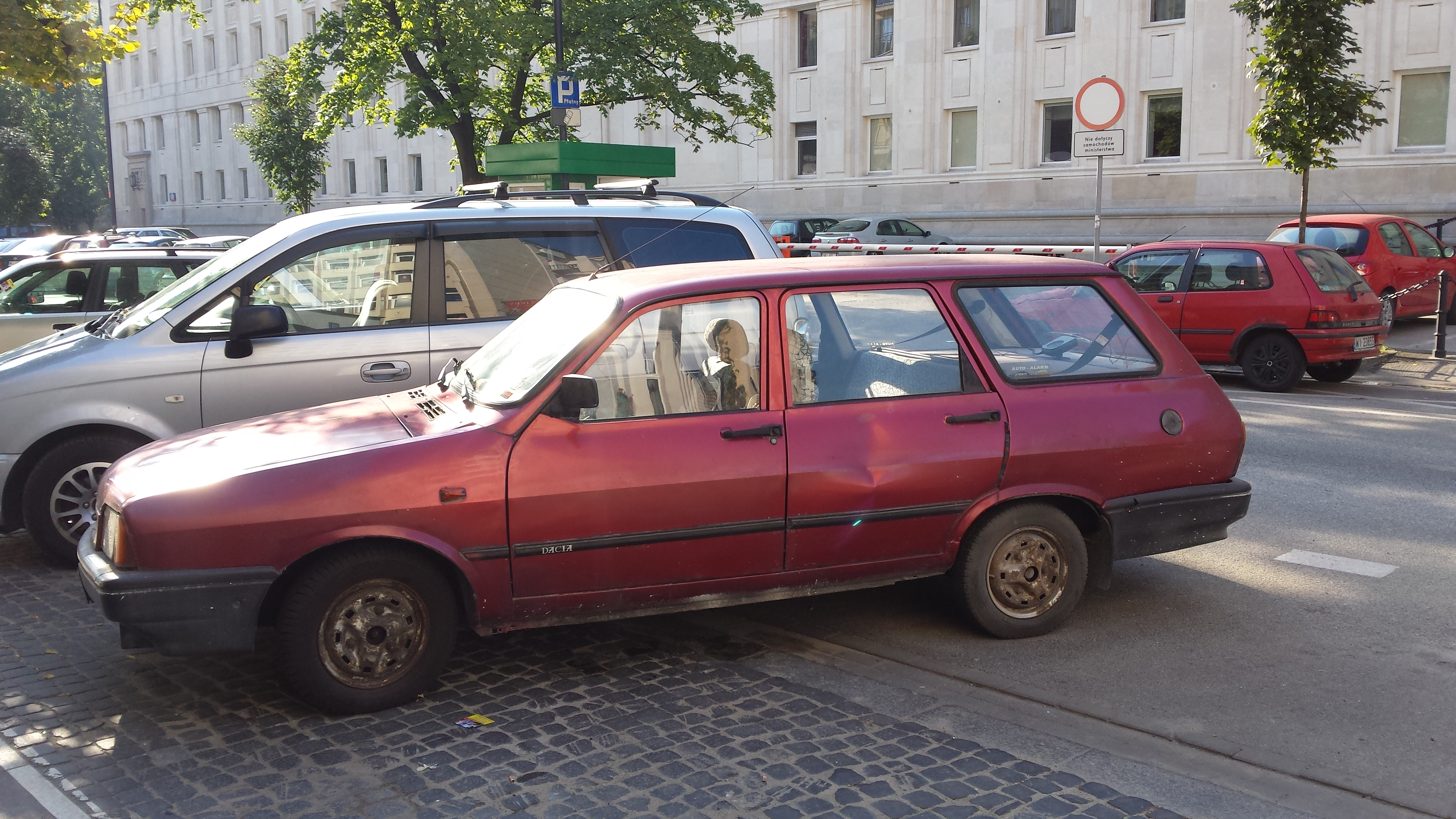
Dacia 1310 (estate; 1995–1999)

In 1997, a pick-up variant and an estate variant with a Peugeot engine of 1905 cm^{3} and 71 hp were presented. In 1999, the 4x4 version of the pick-up variant was launched. In 1996, due to poor sales, the production of the Dacia 1325 Liberta model ceased.

At the beginning of 1999, production of the CN3 ended, being replaced by the CN4.

== 1999 facelift (CN4) ==
Dacia 1310/1410
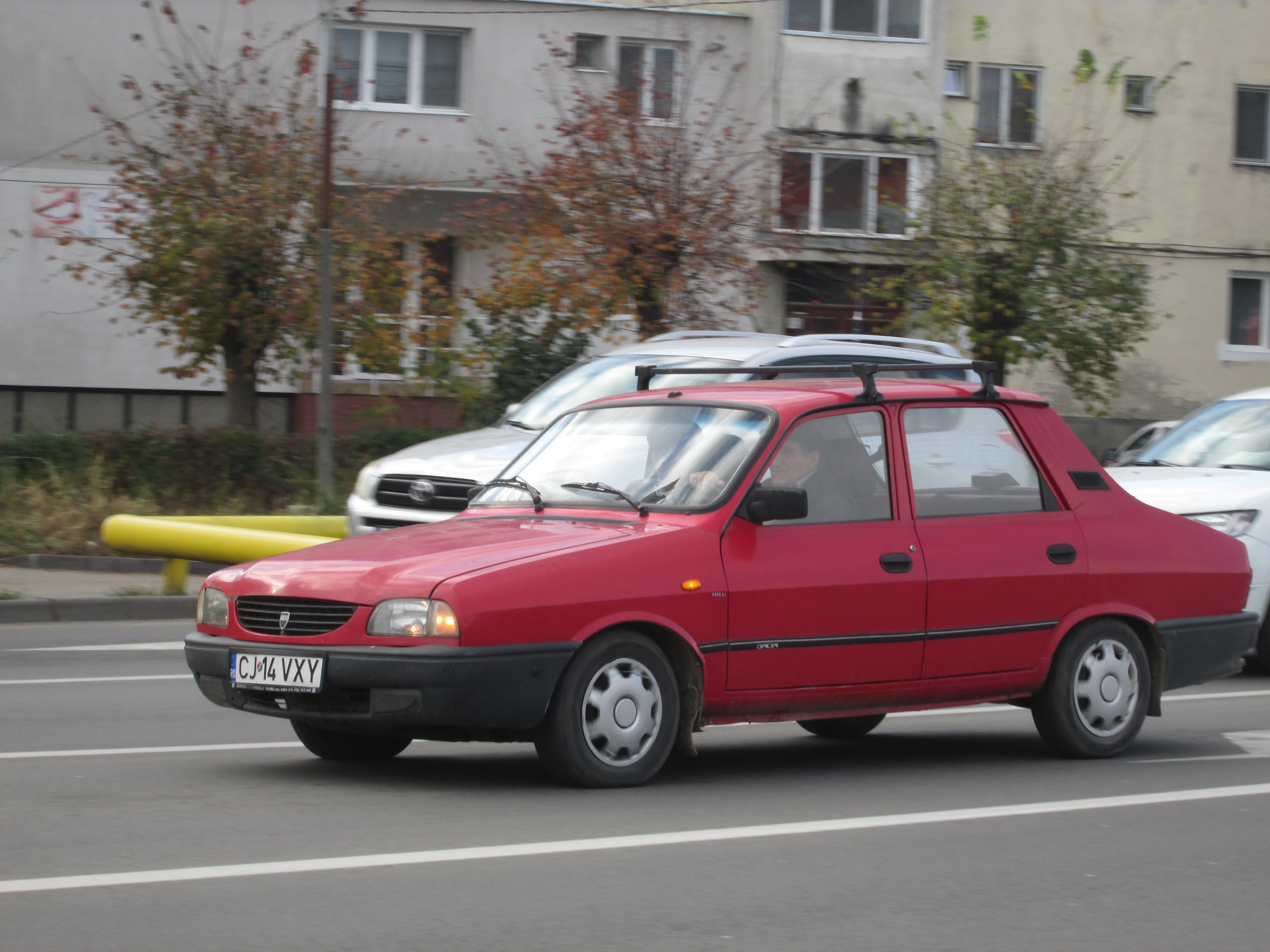
- Dacia 1310 in Turda, Romania.

Overview
- Manufacturer: Dacia
- Also called: Dacia Zâmbetul lui Iliescu (nickname); Dacia Berlină / Break (2002–2004, Romania)
- Production: 1999–2004
- Assembly: Romania: Mioveni
- Designer: I.A. Pitești

Body and chassis
- Class: Small family car (C)
- Body style: 4-door saloon 5-door estate
- Layout: Front-engine, front-wheel-drive Front-engine, four-wheel-drive (Pick-up)
- Platform: Renault 12
- Related: Dacia 1300; Dacia 1320; Dacia 1325; Dacia Pick-Up

Powertrain
- Engine: Petrol: 1.3 L I4; 1.4 L I4
- Transmission: 5-speed manual

Dimensions
- Wheelbase: 2,441 mm (96.1 in)
- Length: 4,348 mm (171.2 in) (saloon); 4,404 mm (173.4 in) (estate)
- Width: 1,636 mm (64.4 in)
- Height: 1,355 mm (53.3 in) (saloon); 1,455 mm (57.3 in) (estate)
- Curb weight: 940 kg (2,072 lb) (saloon); 960 kg (2,116 lb) (estate)

Chronology
- Successor: Dacia Logan

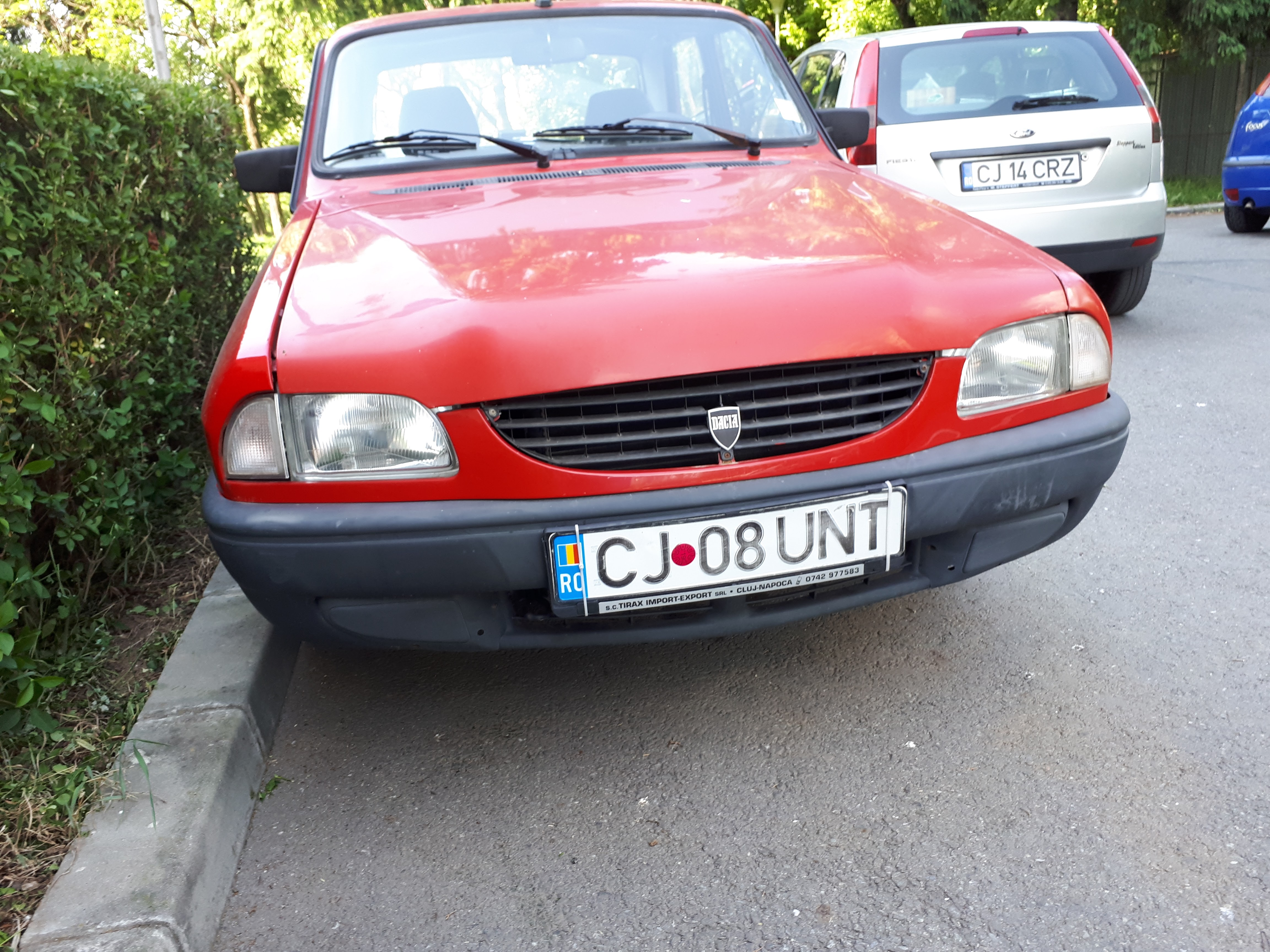

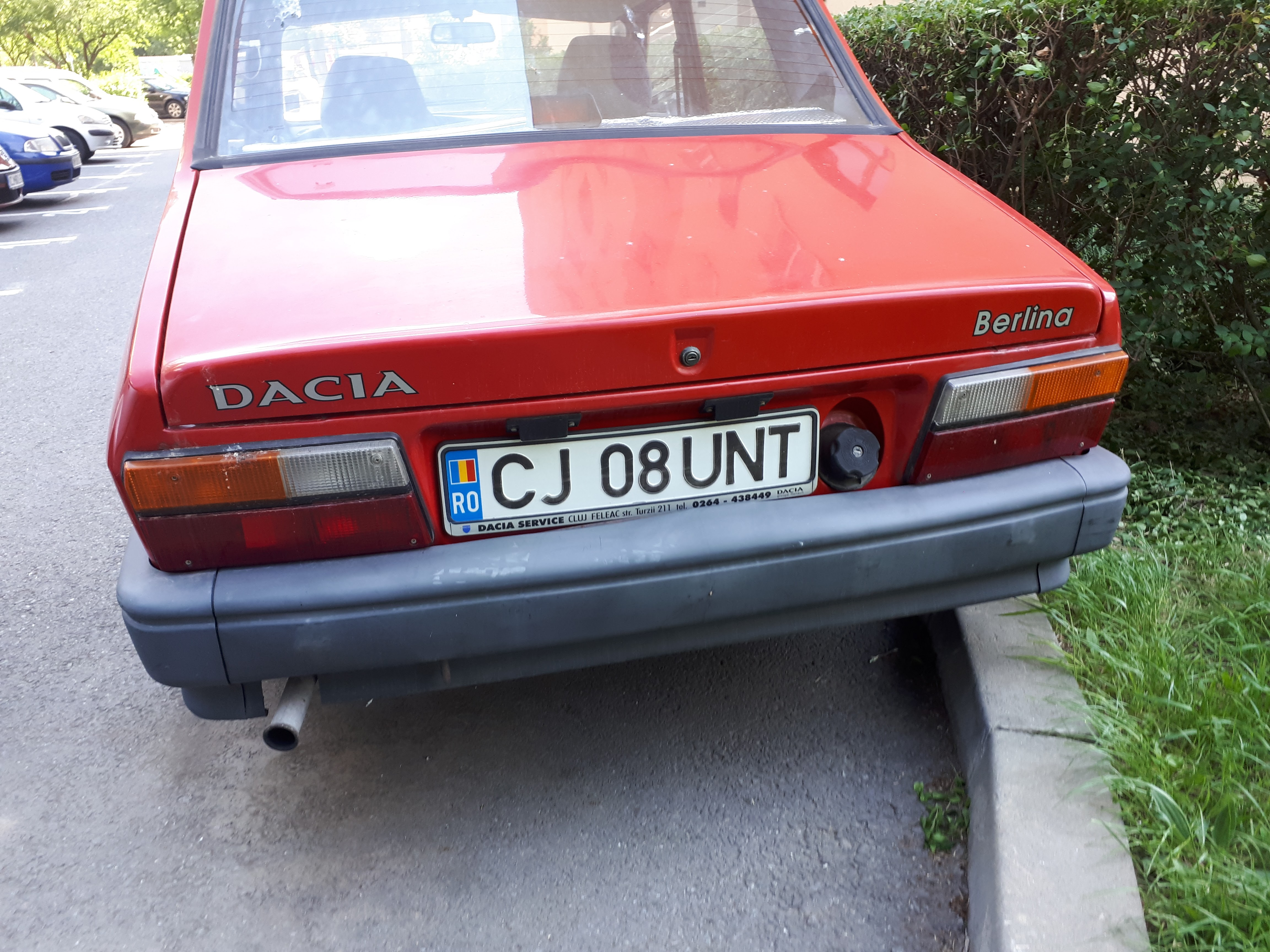
Dacia Berlină (saloon; 2002–2004)

In 1999, the 1310 was restyled for the last time, using the CN4 code. It had headlights that were shaped differently on the outside, but which kept the old rectangular reflector from the CN2 and CN3 models, covered by the hood and the new grille. Also, the exterior door handles were replaced with those from the Dacia Nova. In 1999, the Dacia Dedicație was launched, a limited edition to celebrate the 40th anniversary of the launch of the Dacia 1300 model. They were available as sedan and estate, and were painted in two shades of gray, with aluminum wheels and special side inscriptions.

In 2002, the badges and logo were changed, together with the name, to Dacia Berlină and Dacia Break, respectively, the name 1310 being abandoned. Due to the launch of the SuperNova model, especially the Europa trim, the sales of the regular sedan model decreased considerably, as the prices of the two were comparable. For example, a Dacia SuperNova Europa trim had the same price as the usual 1310 sedan, if you turned in a car in exchange through the Rabla program (Dacia was the initiator of this program to renew the Romanian car fleet in 2000, to reduce the very large number of old and precarious cars in Romania, both brought from abroad and manufactured locally). Thus, starting with 2001, the sedan began to be sold and produced in lower numbers. Sales were still quite good however, mainly to taxi companies and driving schools. The estate model continued to have good sales until the model was finally discontinued in 2004.

In 2004, the production of the sedan and estate versions ceased, after more than three decades, and the last car, number 1,959,730, left the assembly line of the Colibași factory on July 21.

=== Continued production (2004–2006) ===
Until 2006, only the pick-up variants remained in production, but demand was still high. On December 8, 2006, all versions of the Dacia pick-up were discontinued.

== International markets ==
=== Israel ===
In Israel, Dacia vehicles were sold between 1978 and 1989 under the "Delta" brand. The Delta was imported irregularly, and was actually imported four times by different importers.

- In 1978, the vehicle was first marketed in Israel. The sale of the vehicle ended only a year later due to quality problems, which were even publicized on the television show "Chalbotek".
- In 1982 the car was marketed by importer Triumph under the name "Galidi".
- In 1988, after a successful advertising campaign in Israel under the slogan "You can do it too '88", the sale of the vehicle was resumed. The company "Kaiser Illin", through its subsidiary "Capris", managed to sell about 6,000 vehicles. In August 1988, the company went bankrupt, and customers paying down payments did not receive the car or the advance money.
- The last attempt was made by the importer "Mutcars", this time under the original Dacia brand, and the station wagon and pick-up versions under the Shifter name.

=== United Kingdom ===
In 1982, the 1310 was introduced to the UK market as the Dacia Denem. Available in 4-door saloon and 5-door estate models, the Denem was marketed as a budget automobile to compete with various Lada, FSO, and Škoda products that were popular around this time. However, due to its aging Renault platform and relatively high price of £3190 when new, the Denem struggled to sell, and was soon discontinued around 1984. As of 2013, there were no Dacia Denems left registered on UK roads.

== Gallery ==
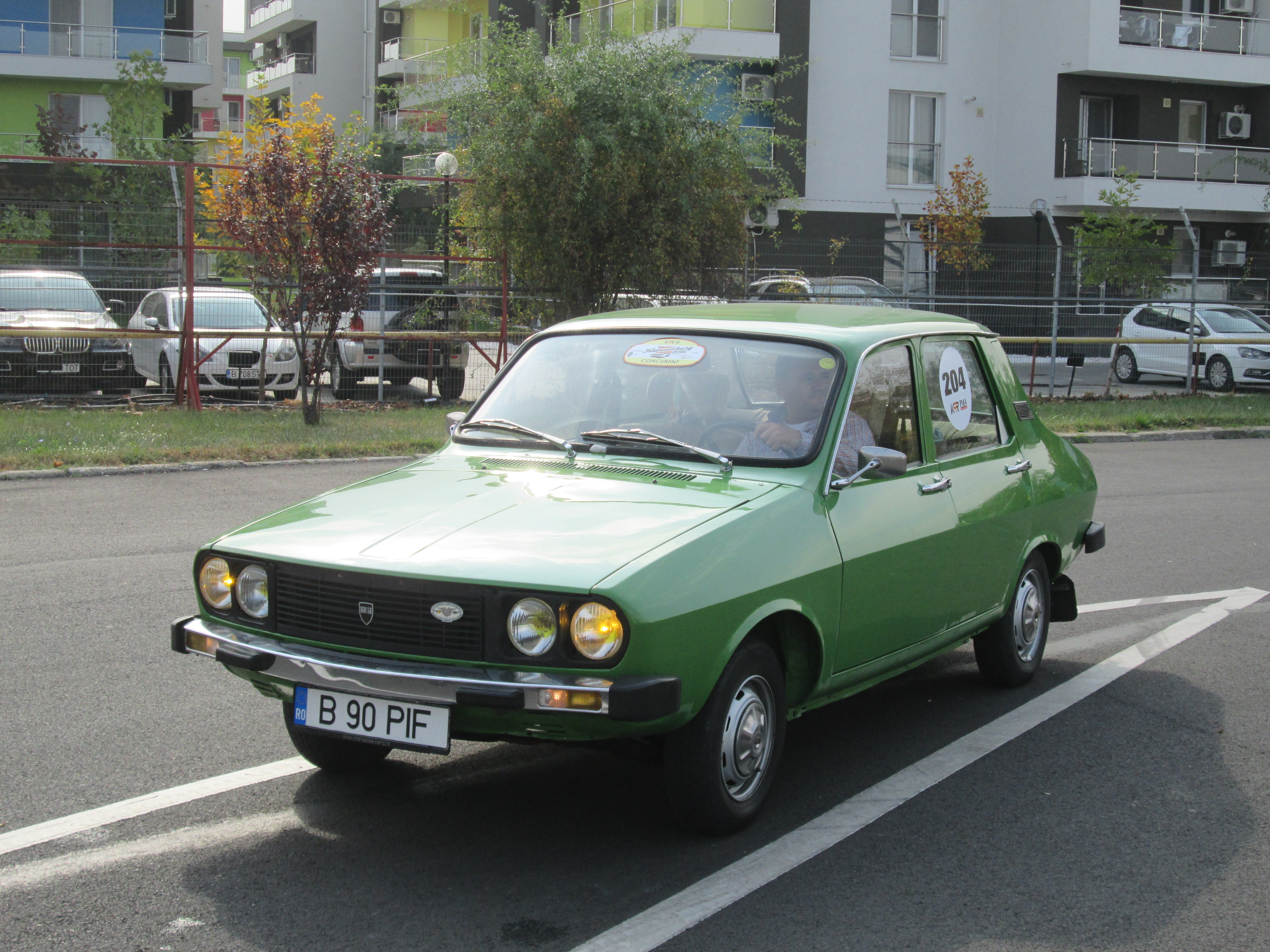
Dacia 1310, model from 1979 to 1984, DDR export version

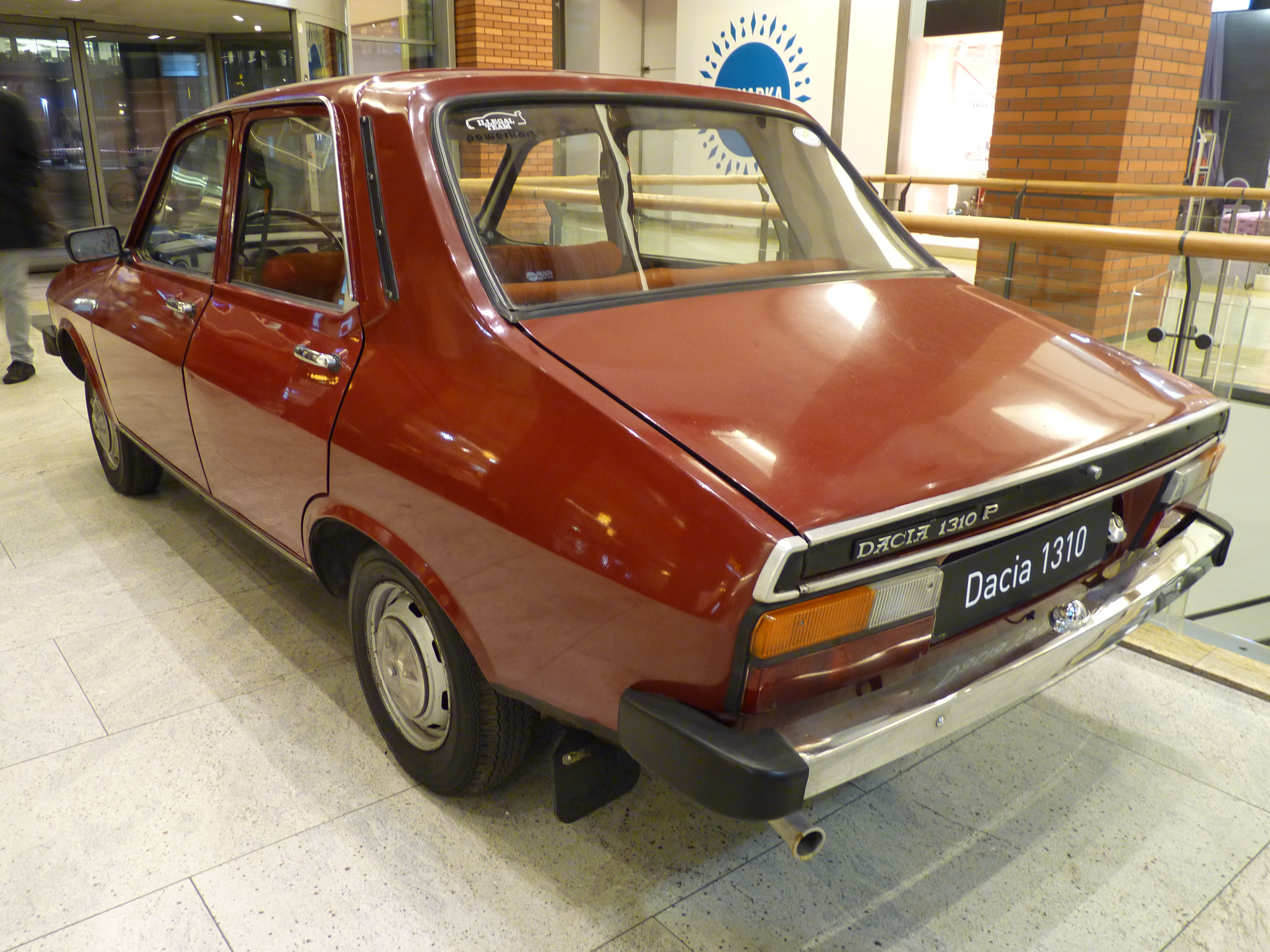
Dacia 1310 P, Polish market version (rear view)

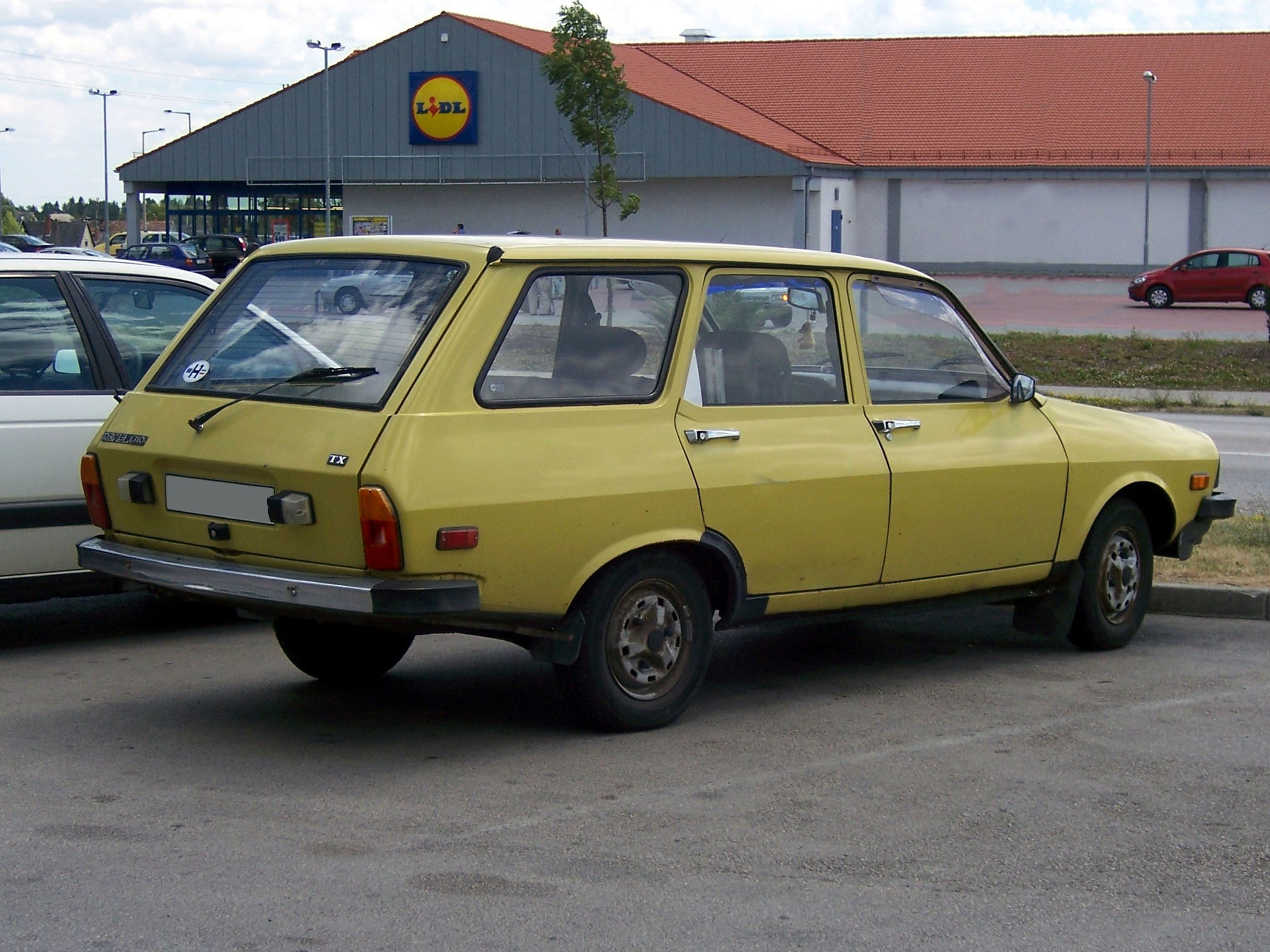
Dacia 1310 Break (Estate)

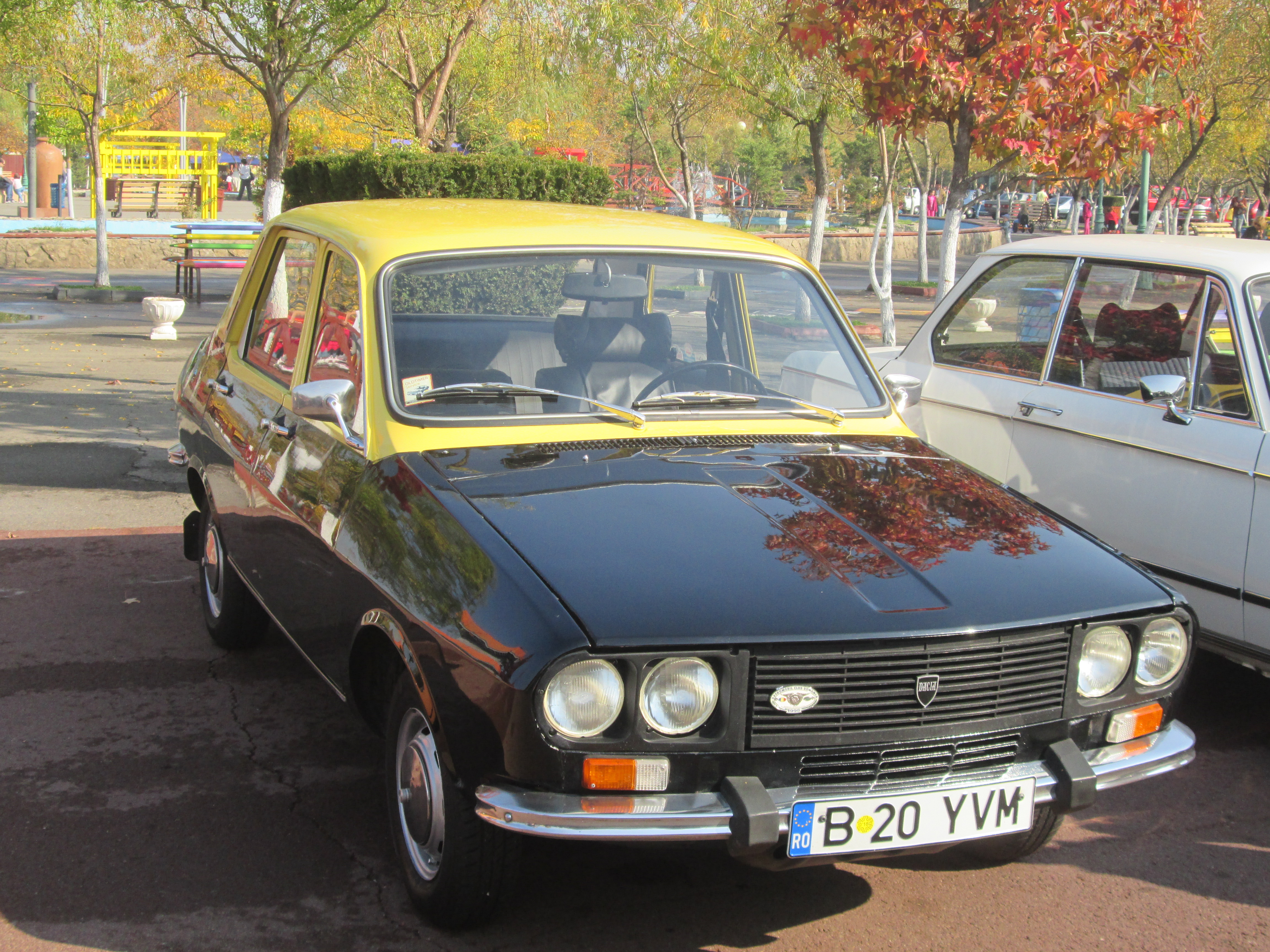
Dacia 1300 with 1310 elements, Colombian taxi export version

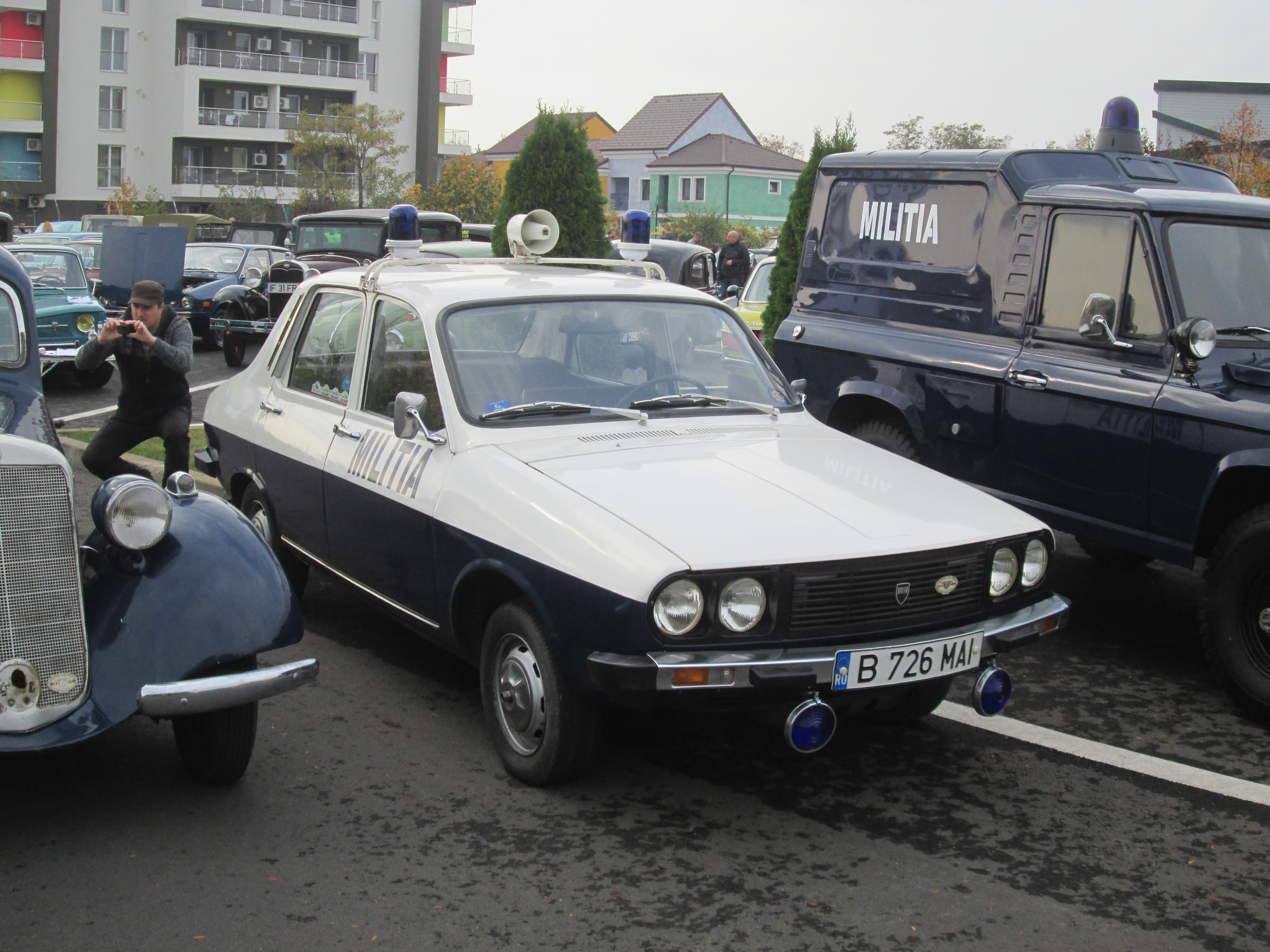
1982 Dacia 1310, Romanian Miliția car livery

== See also ==
- Dacia 1320
- Dacia 1325 Liberta
- Dacia Pick-Up
- Dacia 1300
- Renault 12
