= Dacia Duster Concept =

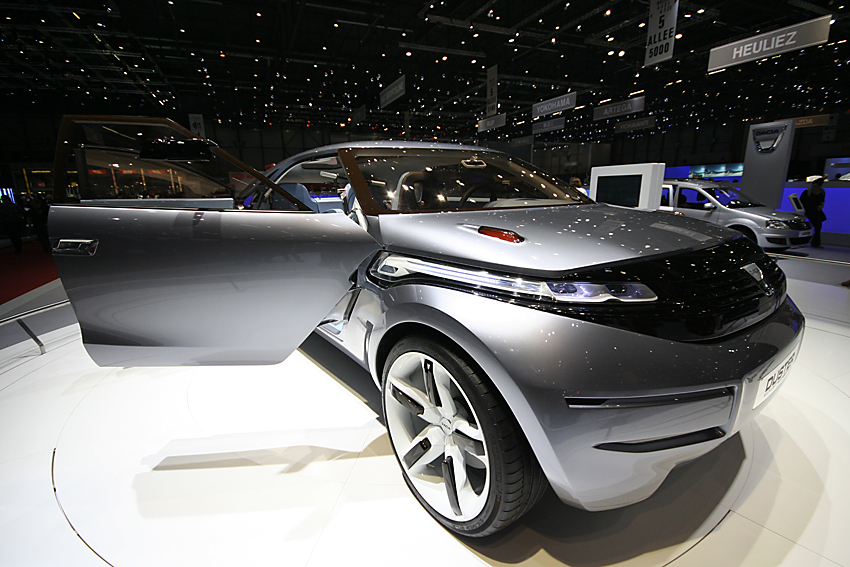
- Presentation of the Duster Concept at the 2009 Geneva International Motor Show

Overview
- Manufacturer: Dacia
- Production: 2009
- Designer: Renault Design Centers in Bucharest and Guyancourt

Body and chassis
- Class: Concept car
- Body style: 3-door SUV

Powertrain
- Engine: Diesel: 1.5 L dCi I4

Dimensions
- Wheelbase: 2,804 mm (110.4 in)
- Length: 4,250 mm (167.3 in)
- Width: 1,640 mm (64.6 in)
- Height: 1,495 mm (58.9 in)
- Curb weight: 1,300 kg (2,866 lb)

Chronology
- Successor: Dacia Duster

The Dacia Duster Concept is the first concept car of the Romanian car manufacturer Dacia, produced in 2009.

== Overview ==
This crossover was presented at the 2009 Geneva International Motor Show, and foreshadowed the future Dacia Duster SUV marketed from 2010.

Designed in collaboration by the Renault Design Central Europe studio in Bucharest and Renault's Technocentre in Paris, the Duster is a crossover coupe with three doors, one on the driver's side and two doors on the passenger's side, including a rear-hinged "suicide" door.

It measures 4,250 millimetres (167 in) in length and is powered by the Renault-Nissan 1.5 dCi diesel engine making 105 horsepower (78 kW). The concept features an adaptable interior, with the passenger seat sliding under the driver's seat, allowing for a large 2-meter long cargo space. The Duster also comes with a tailgated box structure that can slide out from behind the car, creating an additional pickup cargo bed.

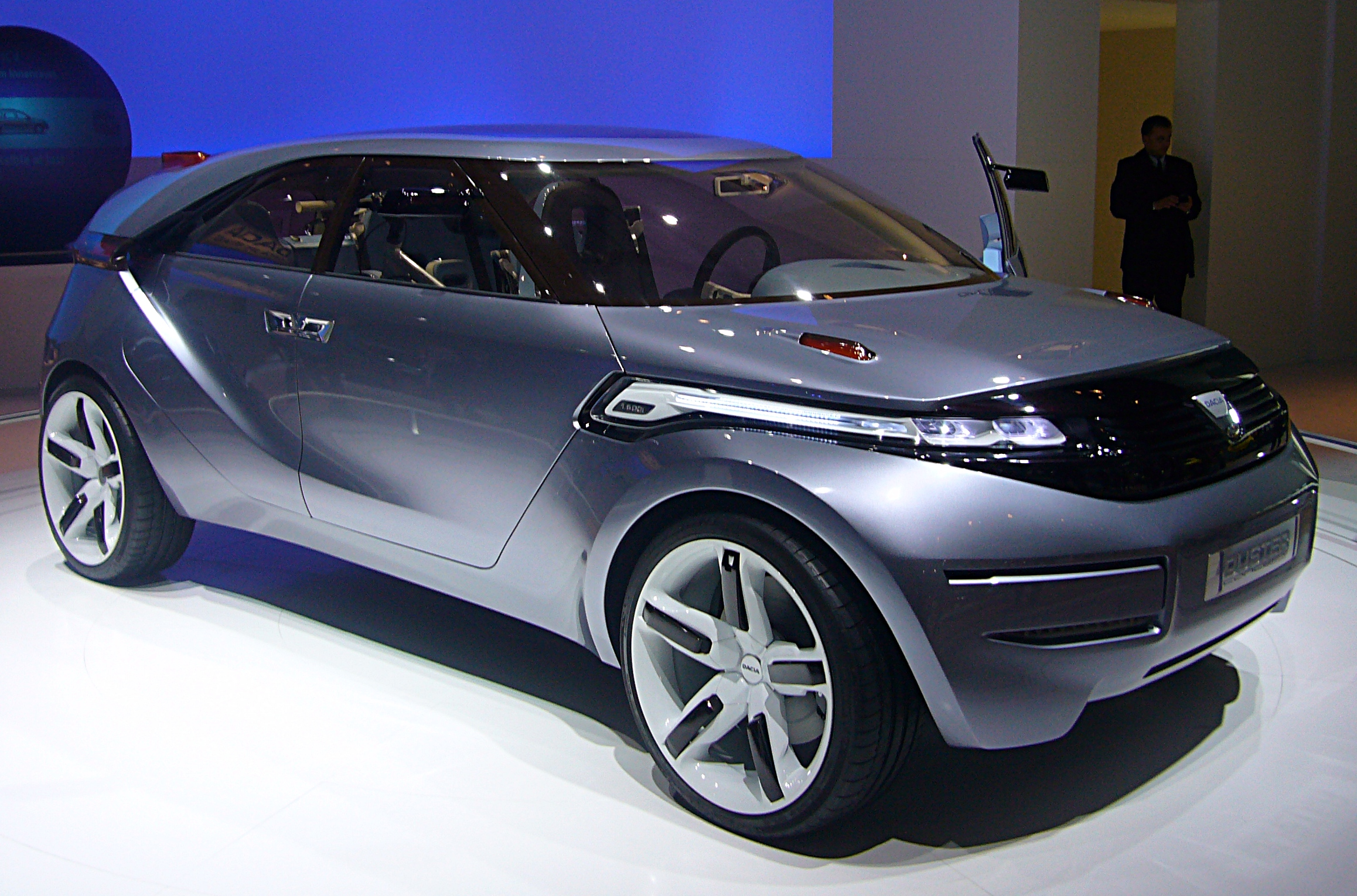
Dacia Duster Concept (front view)

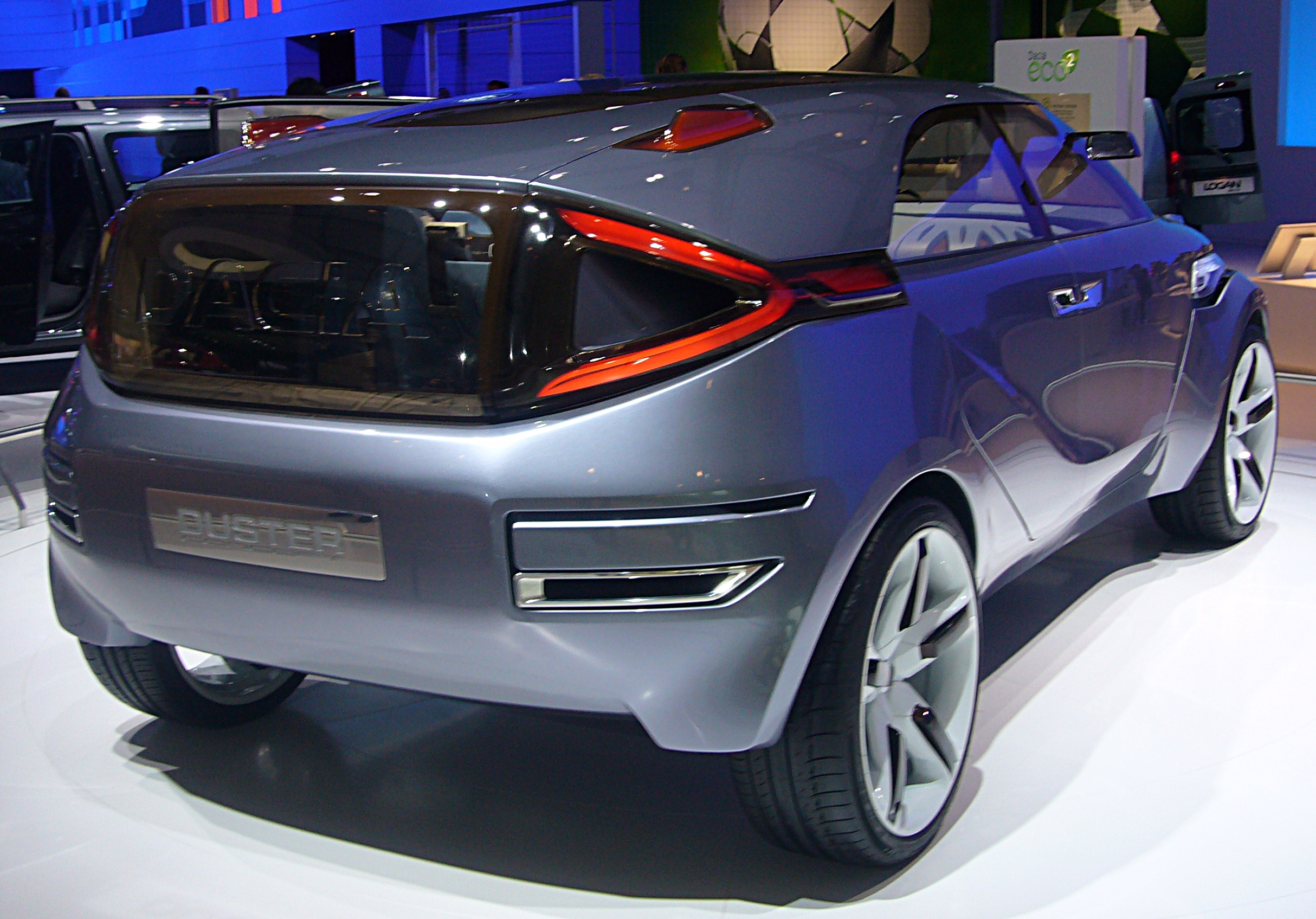
Dacia Duster Concept (rear view)

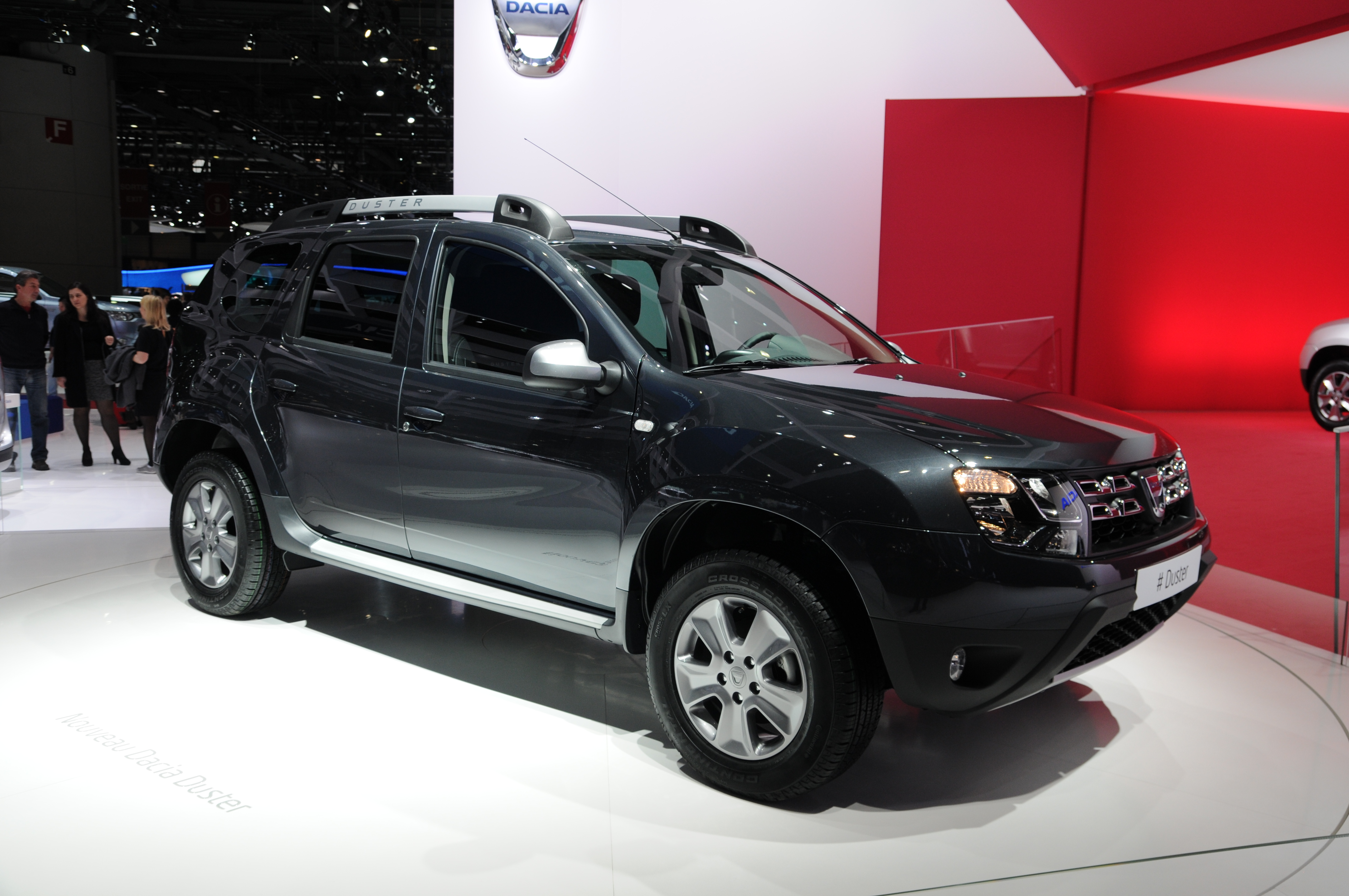
2013 Dacia Duster

== See also ==
- Automobile Dacia
- Dacia Duster
- Dacia Duster II
