= 2022–23 FC Dinamo București season =

Dinamo București
2022–23 season
- Chairman: Vlad Iacob
- Head coach: Ovidiu Burcă
- Stadium: various
- Liga II: 4th (promoted via play-off)
- Cupa României: Group stage
- Top goalscorer: League: Lamine Ghezali (9); All: Lamine Ghezali (13)
Home colours	Away colours

The 2022–23 season was Dinamo București's 74th year in their history and the first played in Liga II. The club also competed in the Cupa României. The season covered the period from 15 June 2022 to 15 June 2023.

== First-team squad ==
Updated last, 30 June 2023

No.	Name	Nationality	Position	Date of birth (age)	Signed from	Signed in	Contract ends
Goalkeepers
12	Denis Oncescu	(Romania)	GK	15 August 2004 (age 18)	Academy	2021	Unknown
13	Alexandru Stoian	(Romania)	GK	12 March 2005 (aged 18)	Academy	2021	Unknown
91	Filip Dujmović	(Bosnia and Herzegovina)	GK	12 March 1999 (age 24)	(Serbia) Radnički Niš	2022	Unknown
Defenders
2	Gabriel Moura	(Brazil)	RB	18 June 1988 (age 35)	Gaz Metan Mediaș	2022	2023
3	David Țone	(Romania)	CB	5 October 2004 (age 18)	Academy	2021	Unknown
7	Alin Demici	(Romania)	LB	4 April 2000 (age 23)	Rapid București	2022	2023
15	David Irimia	(Romania)	RB	12 May 2006 (age 17)	Academy	2023	Unknown
23	Răzvan Patriche (C)	(Romania)	CB	29 April 1986 (age 37)	Academica Clinceni	2022	2023
24	Deniz Giafer	(Romania)	CB	11 May 2001 (age 22)	Academy	2021	Unknown
25	Yanis Cune	(Romania)	CB	14 June 2005 (age 18)	Academy	2021	Unknown
26	Marius Tomozei	(Romania)	RB	9 September 1990 (age 32)	UTA	2022	2023
31	Costin Amzăr	(Romania)	CB	11 July 2003 (age 19)	Academy	2020	2027
Midfielders
4	Quentin Bena	(France)	DM	11 May 1998 (age 25)	(France) Niort	2022	2023
6	Iulian Roșu	(Romania)	AM	30 May 1994 (age 29)	Metaloglobus	2022	Unknown
10	Daniel Iglesias	(Spain)	AM	17 July 1995 (age 27)	(Slovakia) Sereď	2022	2023
18	Valentin Borcea	(Romania)	DM	6 July 2002 (age 20)	Academy	2020	2025
20	Antonio Bordușanu	(Romania)	CM	10 August 2004 (age 18)	Academy	2021	2027
22	Andrei Bani	(Romania)	LM	22 August 2002 (age 20)	Academy	2019	2025
29	Alexandru Irimia	(Romania)	CM	12 May 2006 (age 17)	Academy	2023	Unknown
30	Neluț Roșu	(Romania)	CM	5 July 1993 (age 29)	Voluntari	2022	Unknown
77	Alin Buleică	(Romania)	RM	12 September 1991 (age 31)	Viitorul Târgu Jiu	2022	2023
88	Gorka Larrucea	(Spain)	CM	24 February 1993 (age 30)	(Spain) Amorebieta	2022	2023
96	Cristian Delciu	(Romania)	CM	8 April 2004 (age 19)	Academy	2022	Unknown
98	Andrei Florescu	(Romania)	CM	30 May 2002 (age 21)	Academy	2020	Unknown
99	Lamine Ghezali	(France)	AM	6 July 1999 (age 23)	(France) Saint-Étienne	2022	2023
Forwards
9	Cătălin Țîră	(Romania)	ST	18 June 1994 (age 29)	(Italy) Bisceglie	2022	Unknown
19	Cristian Ionescu	(Romania)	RW	5 October 2003 (age 19)	Academy	2022	Unknown
27	Ionuț Bobea	(Romania)	FW	1 May 2002 (age 21)	AFC Odorheiu Secuiesc	2022	Unknown
33	Alin Șerban	(Romania)	LW	7 September 2002 (age 20)	CS Mioveni	2022	2023
93	Alexandru Pop	(Romania)	FW	21 June 1993 (age 30)	AFC Odorheiu Secuiesc	2022	Unknown
Out on Loan
27	Ricardo Grigore	(Romania)	CB	7 April 1999 (aged 24)	Academy	2017	2024
32	Geani Crețu	(Romania)	CM	12 January 2000 (aged 23)	Academy	2018	2024

== Pre-season friendlies ==
2 July 2022 Friendly	Concordia Chiajna	1 – 0	Dinamo București	Chiajna
11:00 EEST (UTC+3)	Llullaku 12'			Stadium: Concordia

9 July 2022 Friendly	Unirea Slobozia	5 – 0	Dinamo București	Slobozia
11:00 EEST (UTC+3)	Ekollo 30'; Golda 40'; Silaghi 52'; Rus 69'; Afalna 87'			Stadium: 1 Mai

16 July 2022 Friendly	Dinamo București	1 – 3	Unirea Constanța	Clinceni
11:00 EEST (UTC+3)	Țîră 32'		Tudor 45'; Mitrică 70' (pen.), 76'

23 July 2022 Friendly	CSO Plopeni	1 – 2	Dinamo București	Slobozia
11:00 EEST (UTC+3)	77'		Lazăr 5'; Țone 45'	Stadium: 1 Mai

30 July 2022 Friendly	Dinamo București	2 – 0	CS Tunari	Săftica
10:00 EEST (UTC+3)	Gabriel 49'; Pop 77'			Stadium: Baza sportivă Săftica

== Mid-season friendlies ==
21 January 2023 Friendly	Dinamo București	0 – 0	Păulești	Buftea
12:00 EET (UTC+2)				Stadium: CNF Buftea

25 January 2023 Friendly	Dinamo București	1 – 1	Plopeni	Buftea
11:00 EET (UTC+2)	Giafer 90'		Oprea 7'	Stadium: CNF Buftea

4 February 2023 Friendly	Dinamo București	5 – 0	Blejoi	Buftea
12:00 EET (UTC+2)	Țîră 10', 12' (pen.), 43'; Borcea 27'; Florescu 85'			Stadium: CNF Buftea

8 February 2023 Friendly	Muscelul Câmpulung Elite	0 – 3	Dinamo București	Dragoslavele
14:00 EET (UTC+2)			Pop 59'; Bani 61'; Florescu 85'	Stadium: Terenul Sintetic Dragoslavele

10 February 2023 Friendly	Dinamo București	0 – 2	Unirea Slobozia	București
12:00 EET (UTC+2)			Prejmerean 26' (pen.); Rus 76'	Stadium: Complexul Sportiv Ion Țiriac

11 February 2023 Friendly	Dinamo București	0 – 0	Farul II Constanța	Buftea
12:00 EET (UTC+2)				Stadium: CNF Buftea

18 February 2023 Friendly	Dinamo București	2 – 1	Brașov	Petrăchioaia
14:00 EET (UTC+2)	Bani 56'; Roșu 71'		Mitrov 84'	Stadium: Stadion Petrăchioaia

25 March 2023 Friendly	Dinamo București	1 – 1	Petrolul Ploiești	Săftica
12:00 EET (UTC+2)	Șerban 31'		Jefferson 55'	Stadium: Baza sportivă Săftica

== Competitions ==
=== League II ===
==== Regular season ====
===== League table =====
Pos	Team	Pld	W	D	L	GF	GA	GD	Pts	Promotion or relegation
4	Unirea Dej	19	8	8	3	30	25	+5	32	Qualification for Promotion play-off
5	Gloria Buzău	19	8	7	4	27	21	+6	31	Qualification for Promotion play-off
6	Dinamo București	19	9	4	6	27	18	+9	31	Qualification for Promotion play-off
7	Unirea Slobozia	19	8	7	4	30	17	+13	31	Qualification for Relegation play-out Group A
8	Concordia Chiajna	19	9	2	8	22	17	+5	29	Qualification for Relegation play-out Group B

Source: FRF (in Romanian)
Rules for classification: 1) Points; 2) Head-to-head points; 3) Head-to-head goal difference; 4) Head-to-head goals scored; 5)Goal difference; 6) Goals scored;

===== Results summary =====
Overall								Home						Away					
Pld	W	D	L	GF	GA	GD	Pts	W	D	L	GF	GA	GD	W	D	L	GF	GA	GD
19	9	4	6	27	18	+9	31	4	2	3	17	10	+7	5	2	3	10	8	+2

Last updated: 12 March.

===== Results by matchday =====
Matchday	1	2	3	4	5	6	7	8	9	10	11	12	13	14	15	16	17	18	19
Ground	A	H	A	H	A	H	A	H	A	H	A	H	A	H	A	A	H	A	H
Result	W	L	L	L	W	L	L	W	D	W	W	D	D	W	L	W	W	W	D
Position	4	11	14	17	12	15	16	15	14	12	11	11	10	8	11	8	6	6	6

Updated to match(es) played on 12 March. Source:
A = Away; H = Home; W = Win; D = Draw; L = Loss

===== Matches =====
4 August 2022 1	Progresul Spartac București	0 – 1	Dinamo București	Clinceni
17:00 EEST (UTC+3)			Bordușanu 27'	Stadium: Stadionul Clinceni; Referee: Claudiu Marcu (Constanţa)

16 August 2022 2	Dinamo București	1 – 3	Oțelul Galați	Clinceni
18:00 EEST (UTC+3)	Buhăescu 45+2'		Gorovei 33'; Maxim 56'; Cârjan 66'	Stadium: Stadionul Clinceni; Referee: Valentin Porumbel (Olteniţa)

20 August 2022 3	Viitorul Târgu Jiu	2 – 0	Dinamo București	Târgu Jiu
18:45 EEST (UTC+3)	Dragu 56'; Micle 85'			Stadium: Stadionul Tudor Vladimirescu; Referee: Mircea Ardelean (Arad)

27 August 2022 4	Dinamo București	2 – 3	Unirea Dej	Clinceni
11:30 EEST (UTC+3)	Pop 54', 72'		Cocian 31', 58'; Pop 77' (pen.)	Stadium: Stadionul Clinceni; Referee: Valentin Naidin (Turnu Măgurele)

4 September 2022 5	Concordia Chiajna	0 – 1	Dinamo București	Chiajna
11:00 EEST (UTC+3)			Iglesias 71'	Stadium: Stadionul Concordia; Referee: Claudiu Marcu (Constanța)

9 September 2022 6	Dinamo București	1 – 2	Steaua București	Bucharest
21:30 EEST (UTC+3)	Ghezali 41'		Pacionel 44'; Chipirliu 50'	Stadium: Arena Națională; Referee: Iulian Călin (Ștefănești)

18 September 2022 7	Gloria Buzău	2 – 1	Dinamo București	Buzău
11:00 EEST (UTC+3)	López 24'; Gaitán 79'		Giafer 2'	Stadium: Stadionul Municipal; Referee: Ovidiu Robu (Chitila)

4 October 2022 8	Dinamo București	1 – 0	Unirea Slobozia	Giurgiu
17:00 EEST (UTC+3)	Pop 38'			Stadium: Stadionul Marin Anastasovici; Referee: Cătălin Buși (Râmnicu Vâlcea)

9 October 2022 9	Minaur Baia Mare	1 – 1	Dinamo București	Baia Mare
11:00 EEST (UTC+3)	Ciocan 45+2'		Bani 36' (pen.)	Stadium: Stadionul Viorel Mateianu; Referee: Cristian Moldoveanu (Sfantu Gheorghe)

15 October 2022 10	Dinamo București	1 – 0	Ripensia Timișoara	Giurgiu
12:00 EEST (UTC+3)	Patriche 49'			Stadium: Stadionul Marin Anastasovici; Referee: Claudiu Marcu (Constanţa)

22 October 2022 11	Metaloglobus București	1 – 2	Dinamo București	Clinceni
12:00 EEST (UTC+3)	Chiorean 90'		Larrucea 25'; Bani 64'	Stadium: Stadionul Clinceni; Referee: Robert Avram (Pitești)

27 October 2022 12	Dinamo București	0 – 0	Slatina	Giurgiu
17:00 EEST (UTC+3)				Stadium: Stadionul Marin Anastasovici; Referee: Vlad Baban (Iași)

3 November 2022 13	Csíkszereda Miercurea Ciuc	0 – 0	Dinamo București	Miercurea Ciuc
20:00 EET (UTC+2)				Stadium: Stadionul Municipal; Referee: Cătălin Buși (Râmnicu Vâlcea)

13 November 2022 14	Dinamo București	4 – 1	Dumbrăvița	Giurgiu
11:00 EET (UTC+2)	I.Roșu 47'; Buhăescu 60' (pen.); Borcea 79', 90'		Martinov 67'	Stadium: Stadionul Marin Anastasovici; Referee: Mihai Amorăriței (Câmpina)

26 November 2022 15	Politehnica Iași	1 – 0	Dinamo București	Iași
16:00 EET (UTC+2)	Hlistei 49'			Stadium: Stadionul Emil Alexandrescu; Referee: Iulian Călin (Ștefănești)

3 December 2022 16	FC Brașov	0 – 2	Dinamo București	Brașov
13:15 EET (UTC+2)			Buhăescu 15' (pen.); I. Roșu 63'	Stadium: Stadionul Silviu Ploeșteanu; Referee: Adrian Viorel Cojocaru (Galați)

27 February 2023 17	Dinamo București	6 – 0	Unirea Constanța	Bucharest
17:00 EET (UTC+2)	Patriche 6'; Iglesias 9'; Bani 39' (pen.); Ghezali 43'; I. Roșu 66'; Borcea 87'			Stadium: Stadionul Arcul de Triumf; Referee: Dan Buzărnescu (Craiova)

4 March 2023 18	1599 Șelimbăr	1 – 2	Dinamo București	Sibiu
12:00 EET (UTC+2)	Gele 90+1'		Ghezali 30'; I. Roșu 68'	Stadium: Stadionul Municipal; Referee: Marian Barbu (Făgăraș)

12 March 2023 19	Dinamo București	1 – 1	Politehnica Timișoara	Bucharest
13:00 EET (UTC+2)	Iglesias 45'		Oanea 82'	Stadium: Stadionul Arcul de Triumf; Referee: Alin Olaru (Râmnicu Vâlcea)

==== Play-off ====
===== League table =====
Pos	Team	Pld	W	D	L	GF	GA	GD	Pts	Promotion or qualification
1	Politehnica Iași (C, P)	10	5	5	0	20	8	+12	60	Promotion to Liga I
2	Steaua București	10	3	3	4	16	18	−2	52	Ineligible for promotion (Note: Steaua București is ineligible for promotion due to the club being owned by a governmental department/entity, all Liga I clubs are required to be privately owned.)
3	Oțelul Galați (P)	10	4	1	5	8	13	−5	49	Promotion to Liga I
4	Dinamo București (P)	10	4	3	3	16	12	+4	46	Qualification for play-offs
5	Gloria Buzău	10	2	5	3	9	11	−2	42	Qualification for play-offs
6	Unirea Dej	10	1	5	4	2	9	−7	40	

Source: FRF
Rules for classification: 1) Points; 2) Points in the regular season; 3) Head-to-head points; 4) Head-to-head goal difference; 5) Head-to-head goals scored; 6) Head-to-head away goals scored; 7) Goal difference (regular season + play off); 8) Goals scored (regular season + play off); 9) Play-off.
(C) Champions; (P) Promoted

===== Results summary =====
Overall								Home						Away					
Pld	W	D	L	GF	GA	GD	Pts	W	D	L	GF	GA	GD	W	D	L	GF	GA	GD
10	4	3	3	16	12	+4	15	2	2	1	8	4	+4	2	1	2	8	8	0

Last updated: 25 May.

===== Results by matchday =====
Matchday	1	2	3	4	5	6	7	8	9	10
Ground	H	A	H	A	H	A	H	A	H	A
Result	D	W	W	L	L	D	D	W	W	L
Position	5	4	4	4	4	4	4	4	4	4

Updated to match(es) played on 25 May. Source:
A = Away; H = Home; W = Win; D = Draw; L = Loss

===== Matches =====
19 March 2023 1	Dinamo București	1 – 1	Gloria Buzău	Bucharest
12:00 EET (UTC+2)	Bani 45'		Boiciuc 41'	Stadium: Stadionul Arcul de Triumf; Referee: Viorel Flueran (Băilești)

2 April 2023 2	Unirea Dej	0 – 3	Dinamo București	Dej
16:00 EEST (UTC+3)			Larrucea 27'; Iglesias 31', 78'	Stadium: Stadionul Municipal; Referee: Cătălin Buși (Râmnicu Vâlcea)

7 April 2023 3	Dinamo București	3 – 0	Oțelul Galați	Bucharest
20:30 EEST (UTC+3)	Ghezali 62', 87'; Țîră 90+5'			Stadium: Stadionul Arcul de Triumf; Referee: Lucian Rusandu (Sfântu Gheorghe)

18 April 2023 4	Steaua București	2 – 0	Dinamo București	Bucharest
19:00 EEST (UTC+3)	Chipirliu 20' (pen.), 29'			Stadium: Stadionul Steaua; Referee: George Găman (Craiova)

25 April 2023 5	Dinamo București	1 – 3	Politehnica Iași	Bucharest
20:00 EEST (UTC+3)	Ghezali 21'		Harrison 42'; Roman 57', 68'	Stadium: Stadionul Arcul de Triumf; Referee: Florin Andrei (Târgu-Mureș)

1 May 2023 6	Gloria Buzău	2 – 2	Dinamo București	Buzău
17:30 EEST (UTC+3)	Blejdea 9'; Boiciuc 14'		Larrucea 18'; Bani 67' (pen.)	Stadium: Stadionul Municipal; Referee: Andrei Moroiță (Ploiești)

6 May 2023 7	Dinamo București	0 – 0	Unirea Dej	Bucharest
14:45 EEST (UTC+3)				Stadium: Stadionul Arcul de Triumf; Referee: Valentin Naidin (Turnu Măgurele)

11 May 2023 8	Oțelul Galați	0 – 2	Dinamo București	Galați
20:30 EEST (UTC+3)			Larrucea 6'; Bani 27'	Stadium: Stadionul Oțelul; Referee: Iulian Dima (Bucharest)

15 May 2023 9	Dinamo București	3 – 0	Steaua București	Bucharest
20:30 EEST (UTC+3)	Giafer 77'; Ghezali 90+4', 90+9' (pen.)			Stadium: Arena Națională; Referee: Bogdan Dumitrache (Bucharest)

21 May 2023 10	Politehnica Iași	4 – 1	Dinamo București	Iași
13:00 EEST (UTC+3)	Ion 9', 14'; Musi 48', 80'		Ghezali 23'	Stadium: Stadionul Emil Alexandrescu; Referee: Cătălin Buși (Râmnicu Vâlcea)

=== Liga I promotion/relegation play-offs ===
29 May 2023 1st leg	Dinamo București	6 – 1	FC Argeș	Bucharest
20:00 EEST (UTC+3)	Bena 15'; Larrucea 24'; Pop 27'; Ghezali 40', 61'; Iglesias 56'		Zebić 55'	Stadium: Arena Națională; Attendance: 24,468; Referee: Horațiu Feșnic (Cluj-Napoca)

3 June 2023 2nd leg	FC Argeș	4 – 2	Dinamo București	Mioveni
21:00 EEST (UTC+3)	Tofan 14'; Jakoliš 16'; Garita 47', 51'		Ghezali 40'; Pop 60'	Stadium: Stadionul Orăşenesc; Referee: Sebastian Colțescu (Craiova)

Dinamo București won 8-5 on aggregate

=== Cupa României ===
14 September 2022 Round 3	Tunari	0 – 3	Dinamo București	Tunari
16:30 EEST (UTC+3)			Roșu 15'; Bani 62'; Pop 90'	Stadium: Stadionul Comunal; Referee: Sergiu Mavriche (Bacău)

29 September 2022 Round 4	Viitorul Târgu Jiu	0 – 1	Dinamo București	Târgu Jiu
21:30 EEST (UTC+3)			Pop 34'	Stadium: Stadionul Tudor Vladimirescu; Referee: Andrei Moroiță (Ploiești)

18 October 2022 Group stage	Dinamo București	0 – 0	FC U Craiova 1948	Giurgiu
21:00 EEST (UTC+3)				Stadium: Stadionul Marin Anastasovici; Referee: Bogdan Dumitrache (Bucureşti)

8 November 2022 Group stage	Dinamo București	2 – 3	Sepsi OSK Sfântu Gheorghe	Bucharest
21:00 EET (UTC+2)	Ciobotariu 82' (o.g.); I. Roșu 90+3'		Junior 16'; Păun 57'; Patriche 88' (o.g.)	Stadium: Stadionul Arcul de Triumf; Referee: Andrei Moroiţă (Ploieşti)

6 December 2022 Group stage	Unirea Slobozia	3 – 3	Dinamo București	Buzău
19:00 EET (UTC+2)	Toma 39' (pen.); Rus 50'; Pop 68' (o.g.)		Ghezali 17'; Amzăr 24'; I. Roșu 30'; Bena (red card) 37'; Pop (yellow card) 75' (yellow-red card); Amzăr (yellow card) 90+1' (yellow-red card)	Stadium: Stadionul Municipal; Referee: Sorin Vadana (Cluj-Napoca)

== Squad statistics ==
=== Appearances and goals ===
Players with no appearances are not included on the list.

As of match played 3 June 2023

No.	Pos	Nat	Player	Total		Liga II		Cupa României		Promotion play-off	
No.	Pos	Nat	Player	Apps	Goals	Apps	Goals	Apps	Goals	Apps	Goals
2	DF	(Brazil) BRA	Moura	33	0	28+1	0	2	0	2	0
3	DF	(Romania) ROU	Țone	3	0	2+1	0	0	0		
4	MF	(France) FRA	Bena	22	1	10+7	0	3	0	2	1
6	MF	(Romania) ROU	I. Roșu	22	6	9+8	4	2+1	2	2	0
7	DF	(Romania) ROU	Demici	2	0	0+1	0	0+1	0		
9	FW	(Romania) ROU	Țîră	15	1	2+9	1	2	0	0+2	0
10	MF	(Spain) ESP	Iglesias	31	6	22+3	5	3+1	0	2	1
12	GK	(Romania) ROU	Oncescu	18	0	15	0	2+1	0		
15	DF	(Romania) ROU	D. Irimia	7	0	4+3	0	0	0		
18	MF	(Romania) ROU	Borcea	19	3	6+9	3	1+2	0	0+1	0
20	MF	(Romania) ROU	Bordușanu	15	1	12+2	1	1	0		
22	MF	(Romania) ROU	Bani	34	7	24+4	6	4+1	1	0+1	0
23	DF	(Romania) ROU	Patriche	28	2	24	2	4	0		
24	DF	(Romania) ROU	Giafer	35	2	27+1	2	4+1	0	2	0
27	FW	(Romania) ROU	Bobea	1	0	0+1	0	0	0		
29	MF	(Romania) ROU	A. Irimia	4	0	1+3	0	0	0		
30	MF	(Romania) ROU	N. Roșu	34	1	25+2	0	4+1	1	2	0
31	DF	(Romania) ROU	Amzăr	30	1	24+1	0	3	1	2	0
33	MF	(Romania) ROU	Șerban	12	0	3+5	0	1+1	0	0+2	0
77	MF	(Romania) ROU	Buleică	6	0	1+3	0	2	0		
88	MF	(Spain) ESP	Larrucea	27	5	20+1	4	3+1	0	2	1
91	GK	(Bosnia and Herzegovina) BIH	Dujmović	20	0	14	0	3+1	0	2	0
93	FW	(Romania) ROU	Pop	29	7	10+12	3	2+3	2	2	2
96	MF	(Romania) ROU	Delciu	7	0	0+5	0	0+2	0		
98	MF	(Romania) ROU	Florescu	11	0	0+7	0	1+1	0	0+2	0
99	MF	(France) FRA	Ghezali	31	13	20+4	9	5	1	2	3
Players sold, released or loaned out during the season:
5	DF	(Romania) ROU	Dudea	11	0	4+5	0	1+1	0		
8	MF	(Romania) ROU	Lazăr	8	0	5+2	0	0+1	0		
17	MF	(Romania) ROU	Crețu	1	0	0+1	0	0	0		
21	FW	(Romania) ROU	Buhăescu	16	3	7+6	3	2+1	0		

=== Disciplinary record ===
As of match played 3 June 2022

Rank	No.	Nat.	Po.	Name	Liga II			Cupa României			Promotion play-off			Total		
Rank	No.	Nat.	Po.	Name	Booked	(yellow card) (yellow-red card)	Sent off (straight red)	Booked	(yellow card) (yellow-red card)	Sent off (straight red)	Booked	(yellow card) (yellow-red card)	Sent off (straight red)	Booked	(yellow card) (yellow-red card)	Sent off (straight red)
1	31	(Romania)	DF	Costin Amzăr	8	1	0	2	1	0	0	0	0	10	2	0
2	22	(Romania)	MF	Andrei Bani	7	0	0	2	0	0	0	0	0	9	0	0
3	88	(Spain)	MF	Gorka Larrucea	7	0	0	1	0	0	0	0	0	8	0	0
3	99	(France)	MF	Lamine Ghezali	6	0	0	1	0	0	1	0	0	8	0	0
4	23	(Romania)	DF	Răzvan Patriche	5	1	0	1	0	0	0	0	0	6	1	0
4	30	(Romania)	MF	Neluț Roșu	7	0	0	0	0	0	0	0	0	7	0	0
5	2	(Brazil)	DF	Gabriel	5	0	0	0	0	0	1	0	0	6	0	0
5	4	(France)	MF	Quentin Bena	2	0	0	0	0	1	2	0	0	4	0	1
6	6	(Romania)	MF	Iulian Roșu	3	0	1	0	0	0	0	0	0	3	0	1
6	93	(Romania)	FW	Alexandru Darius Pop	3	0	0	1	1	0	0	0	0	4	1	0
6	9	(Romania)	FW	Cătălin Țîră	2	0	1	0	0	0	1	0	0	3	0	1
7	10	(Spain)	MF	Dani Iglesias	4	0	0	0	0	0	0	0	0	4	0	0
8	8	(Romania)	MF	Valentin Lazăr	3	0	0	0	0	0	0	0	0	3	0	0
8	5	(Romania)	DF	Alin Dudea	3	0	0	0	0	0	0	0	0	3	0	0
8	24	(Romania)	DF	Deniz Giafer	2	0	0	0	0	0	1	0	0	3	0	0
9	77	(Romania)	MF	Alin Buleică	2	0	0	0	0	0	0	0	0	2	0	0
9	21	(Romania)	FW	Vasile Buhăescu	2	0	0	0	0	0	0	0	0	2	0	0
9	12	(Romania)	GK	Denis Oncescu	2	0	0	0	0	0	0	0	0	2	0	0
9	91	(Bosnia and Herzegovina)	GK	Filip Dujmović	1	0	0	1	0	0	0	0	0	2	0	0
10	33	(Romania)	MF	Alin Șerban	0	0	0	1	0	0	0	0	0	1	0	0
10	18	(Romania)	MF	Valentin Borcea	0	0	0	1	0	0	0	0	0	1	0	0
10	15	(Romania)	DF	David Irimia	1	0	0	0	0	0	0	0	0	1	0	0
Total					74	2	2	11	2	1	6	0	0	91	4	3

== Transfers ==
=== Transfers in ===
Date	Position	Nationality	Name	From	Fee	Ref.
27 June 2022	FW	(Romania)	Bogdan Gavrilă	Sirens	Free	
12 July 2022	RM	(Romania)	Valentin Lazăr	CSM Reșița	Free	
12 July 2022	RM	(Romania)	Neluț Roșu	FC Voluntari	Free	
22 July 2022	FW	(Romania)	Vasile Buhăescu	CSA Steaua	Free	
30 July 2022	AM	(Spain)	Daniel Iglesias	Sereď	Free	
2 August 2022	AM	(Romania)	Ionuţ Bobea	Odorheiu Secuiesc	Free	
2 August 2022	AM	(Romania)	Iulian Roșu	Metaloglobus	Free	
2 August 2022	FW	(Romania)	Alexandru Pop	AFC Odorheiu Secuiesc	Free	
2 August 2022	FW	(Romania)	Cătălin Țîră	Bisceglie	Free	
17 August 2022	AM	(France)	Lamine Ghezali	Saint-Étienne	Free	
17 August 2022	DM	(France)	Quentin Bena	Niort	Free	
23 August 2022	GK	(Bosnia and Herzegovina)	Filip Dujmović	Radnički Niš	Free	
25 August 2022	CM	(Spain)	Gorka Larrucea	Amorebieta	Free	

=== Loans in ===
Date from	Position	Nationality	Name	From	Date until	Ref.
1 July 2022	LB	(Romania)	Alin Demici	Rapid București	30 June 2023	
2 August 2022	LW	(Romania)	Alin Șerban	CS Mioveni	30 June 2023	

=== Loans out ===
Date from	Position	Nationality	Name	To	Date until	Ref.
10 July 2022	CB	(Romania)	Ricardo Grigore	FCU Craiova 1948	31 December 2022	
14 February 2023	CB	(Romania)	Ricardo Grigore	Petrolul Ploiești	30 June 2023	
5 September 2022	CM	(Romania)	Geani Crețu	Argeș	30 June 2023	

=== Transfers out ===
Date	Position	Nationality	Name	To	Fee	Ref.

=== Released ===
Date	Position	Nationality	Name	Subsequent club	Joined date	Ref.
1 June 2022	GK	(Portugal)	Cristiano Figueiredo	Spartak Varna	21 January 2022	
1 June 2022	CB	(France)	Baptiste Aloé	Nancy	3 February 2022	
1 June 2022	DM	(France)	Balthazar Pierret	Quevilly-Rouen	18 January 2022	
1 June 2022	ST	(Nigeria)	Christian Irobiso	Petrolul Ploiești	11 March 2022	
1 June 2022	AM	(Romania)	Cosmin Matei	Sepsi Sfântu Gheorghe	4 September 2021	
2 June 2022	RW	(Romania)	Gabriel Torje	Farul Constanța	4 September 2021	
10 June 2022	FW	(Romania)	Vlad Morar	Farul Constanța	18 February 2022	
15 June 2022	CB	(Croatia)	Igor Jovanović	Brașov	18 January 2022	
20 June 2022	FW	(North Macedonia)	Mirko Ivanovski	Petrolul Ploiești	9 September 2021	
27 June 2022	CM	(Romania)	Alexandru Răuță	Hermannstadt	7 June 2019	
28 June 2022	CM	(Romania)	Răzvan Grădinaru	Karmiotissa	18 February 2022	
30 June 2022	RM	(Romania)	Andreas Mihaiu	Chindia Târgoviște	2019	
1 July 2022	CM	(Romania)	Liviu Gheorghe	Înainte Modelu	2017	
1 July 2022	ST	(Romania)	Cătălin Măgureanu	Înainte Modelu	2020	
8 July 2022	LB	(Romania)	Steliano Filip	Mezőkövesdi	23 January 2021	
12 July 2022	LB	(Romania)	Andrei Radu	PAS Giannina	5 October 2020	
27 July 2022	CB	(Romania)	Marco Ehmann	Enosis Neon Paralimni	2018	
1 August 2022	CM	(Romania)	Claudiu Stan	Free agent	2021	
6 August 2022	GK	(Romania)	Mihai Eșanu	Chindia Târgovişte	2020	
30 November 2022	AM	(Romania)	Valentin Lazăr	CS Păulești	12 July 2022	
20 January 2023	GK	(Romania)	Ștefan Fara	CS Dinamo București	2019	
20 January 2023	CB	(Romania)	Alin Dudea	CSM Reșița	2014	
20 January 2023	FW	(Romania)	Vasile Buhăescu	CSM Vaslui	22 July 2022	
31 January 2023	FW	(Romania)	Bogdan Gavrilă	NEROCA FC	27 June 2022	
