= 2023–24 FC Dinamo București season =

Dinamo București
2023–24 season
- Chairman: Andrei Nicolescu
- Head coach: Ovidiu Burcă (until 28 November); Željko Kopić (from 1 December)
- Stadium: Arena Națională & Arcul de Triumf
- Liga I: 13th
- Cupa României: Group Stage
- Top goalscorer: League: Gonçalo Gregório (7); All: Dennis Politic (8); Gonçalo Gregório (8)
- Average home league attendance: 8,024
Home colours	Away colours

The 2023–24 season was the 75th year in their history of Dinamo București and their first season back in the Liga I since the 2021–22 season following their promotion from the Liga II in the previous season. The club also competed in the Cupa României.

== Squad at the end of the season ==
Updated last, 17 April 2024

No.	Name	Nationality	Position	Date of birth (age)	Signed from	Signed in	Contract ends
Goalkeepers
1	Adnan Golubović	(Slovenia)	GK	22 July 1995 (aged 28)	(Slovenia) FC Koper	2023	2025
39	Dorian Railean	(Moldova)	GK	13 October 1993 (aged 30)	Chindia Târgoviște	2024	Unknown
73	Răzvan Began	(Romania)	GK	12 August 1996 (aged 27)	FC Botoșani	2023	Unknown
Defenders
2	Gabriel Moura (VC)	(Brazil)	RB	18 June 1988 (aged 36)	Gaz Metan Mediaș	2022	2024
4	Quentin Bena	(France)	CB	11 May 1998 (aged 26)	(France) Chamois Niort	2022	2025
15	David Irimia	(Romania)	RB	12 May 2006 (aged 18)	Academy	2023	Unknown
23	Răzvan Patriche (C)	(Romania)	CB	29 April 1986 (aged 38)	Academica Clinceni	2022	2025
24	Darko Velkovski	(North Macedonia)	CB	21 June 1995 (aged 29)	Free Agent	2024	2024
27	Ricardo Grigore	(Romania)	CB	7 April 1999 (aged 25)	Academy	2017	2024
28	Josué Homawoo	(Togo)	CB	12 November 1997 (aged 26)	(France) Red Star FC	2023	2025
31	Costin Amzăr	(Romania)	LB	11 July 2003 (aged 20)	Academy	2020	2027
32	Edgar Ié	(Guinea-Bissau)	CB	1 May 1994 (aged 30)	(Turkey) İstanbul Başakşehir	2024	2024
98	Cristian Costin	(Romania)	RB	17 June 1998 (aged 26)	FC Voluntari	2023	2025
Midfielders
6	Cristian Licsandru	(Romania)	CM	27 March 2003 (aged 21)	Free Agent	2024	Unknown
8	Eddy Gnahoré	(France)	CM	14 November 1993 (aged 30)	(Italy) Ascoli Calcio	2024	2025
10	Daniel Iglesias	(Spain)	CM	17 July 1995 (aged 28)	(Slovakia) ŠKF Sereď	2022	2025
16	Christian Ilić	(Croatia)	CM	22 July 1996 (aged 27)	(Cyprus) Doxa Katokopias	2023	2025
18	Domagoj Pavičić	(Croatia)	CM	9 March 1994 (aged 30)	(Greece) Aris Thessaloniki	2024	2024
22	Andrei Bani	(Romania)	AM	22 August 2002 (aged 21)	Academy	2019	2025
29	Alexandru Irimia	(Romania)	CM	12 May 2006 (aged 18)	Academy	2023	Unknown
30	Neluț Roșu (VC)	(Romania)	CM	5 July 1993 (aged 30)	FC Voluntari	2022	2025
77	Georgi Milanov	(Bulgaria)	AM	19 February 1992 (aged 32)	Free Agent	2024	2025
Forwards
7	Gonçalo Gregório	(Portugal)	ST	14 June 1995 (aged 29)	(Portugal) UD Leiria	2023	2025
9	Astrit Selmani	(Kosovo)	ST	13 May 1997 (aged 27)	(Israel) Hapoel Be'er Sheva	2024	2025
17	Dennis Politic	(Romania)	LW	5 March 2000 (aged 24)	(Italy) US Cremonese	2023	2025
19	Hakim Abdallah	(Madagascar)	ST	9 January 1998 (aged 26)	(Belgium) RE Virton	2023	2026
20	Antonio Bordușanu	(Romania)	RW	10 August 2004 (aged 19)	Academy	2021	2027
21	Petru Neagu	(Moldova)	LW	13 August 1999 (aged 24)	(Moldova) CSF Bălți	2024	2025
Out on Loan
12	Denis Oncescu	(Romania)	GK	15 August 2004 (aged 19)	Academy	2021	Unknown
13	Alexandru Stoian	(Romania)	GK	12 March 2005 (aged 19)	Academy	2021	Unknown
18	Valentin Borcea	(Romania)	AM	6 July 2002 (aged 21)	Academy	2020	2025
19	Cristian Ionescu	(Romania)	RW	5 October 2003 (aged 20)	Academy	2022	Unknown
24	Deniz Giafer	(Romania)	CB	11 May 2001 (aged 23)	Academy	2021	Unknown
98	Andrei Florescu	(Romania)	LW	30 May 2002 (aged 22)	Academy	2020	Unknown
-	Alexandru Serafim	(Romania)	LB	27 October 2005 (aged 18)	Academy	2024	Unknown
-	Vlăduț Stanciu	(Romania)	ST	1 January 2005 (aged 19)	Academy	2023	Unknown

== Pre-season and friendlies ==
24 June 2023 Friendly	Dinamo București	10 – 2	Muscelul Câmpulung Elite	Snagov
11:30 EEST (UTC+3)	Crețu 16'; N. Roșu 29'; Țîră 40'; Pop 50', 62'; Florescu 51', 72', 74'; Ghezali 59'; Șerban 75' (pen.)	Report	69'; 88'	Stadium: Voința

28 June 2023 Friendly	Dinamo București	1 – 0	(Croatia) Slaven Belupo	Markovci
19:00 EEST (UTC+3)	Grigore 85'	Report		Stadium: Stojnci Sports Park

2 July 2023 Friendly	Dinamo București	0 – 1	(Hungary) Zalaegerszegi TE	Zreče
19:00 EEST (UTC+3)			87'	Stadium: Dobrovlje

5 July 2023 Friendly	Dinamo București	1 – 4	(Ukraine) Dynamo Kyiv	Völkermarkt
18:00 EEST (UTC+3)	Bani 38'		10'; 18'; 67'; 73'	Stadium: Lilienberg-Arena

12 July 2023 Friendly	Dinamo București	4 – 2	CS Tunari	Balotești
20:00 EEST (UTC+3)	Abdallah (?); Țîră (?); Borcea (?); Politic (?)		(?) (?)	Stadium: Baza Săftica

27 July 2023 Friendly	Dinamo București	1 – 0	Unirea Slobozia	Balotești
19:00 EEST (UTC+3)	Gregório 36' (pen.)			Stadium: Baza Săftica

9 January 2024 Friendly	(Turkey) Gençlerbirliği SK	1 – 1	Dinamo București	Belek
12:30 EEST (UTC+3)	? 18'		N. Roșu 52'	Stadium: Calista

12 January 2024 Friendly	Dinamo București	2 – 6	(Belgium) Royal Charleroi	Side
14:00 EEST (UTC+3)	Gregório 9' (pen.); Abdallah 40'		? 25' ? 62' ? 65', 69', 86' ? 72'	Stadium: Kamelya Selin

21 March 2024 Friendly	Dinamo București	3 – 4	Progresul Spartac București	Balotești
11:00 EEST (UTC+3)	Selmani 39', 55'; Neagu 82'		? 34', 52', 68' ? 38' (pen.)	Stadium: Baza Săftica

== Competitions ==
=== Liga I ===
==== Regular season ====
===== League table =====
Pos	Team	Pld	W	D	L	GF	GA	GD	Pts	Qualification
12	Politehnica Iași	30	7	12	11	33	44	−11	33	Qualification to play-out round
13	FCU 1948 Craiova	30	9	4	17	43	50	−7	31	Qualification to play-out round
14	Dinamo București	30	8	5	17	22	41	−19	29	Qualification to play-out round
15	Voluntari	30	6	10	14	31	49	−18	28	Qualification to play-out round
16	Botoșani	30	3	12	15	30	52	−22	21	Qualification to play-out round

Source: , Soccerway
Rules for classification: 1) Points; 2) Head-to-head points; 3) Head-to-head goal difference; 4) Head-to-head goals scored; 5) Goal difference; 6) Goals scored; 7) Play-off.

===== Matches =====
17 July 2023 1	Dinamo București	0 – 2	Universitatea Craiova	București
21:30 EEST (UTC+3)			Ivan 54' (pen.); Marković 90+6'	Stadium: Arcul de Triumf; Attendance: 6,900; Referee: Horațiu Feșnic (Cluj-Napoca)

22 July 2023 2	FCSB	2 – 1	Dinamo București	București
21:30 EEST (UTC+3)	Coman 30'; Olaru 35'		Gregório 83'	Stadium: Arcul de Triumf; Attendance: 6,132; Referee: Sebastian Colțescu (Craiova)

31 July 2023 3	Dinamo București	0 – 3	Sepsi Sfântu Gheorghe	București
21:30 EEST (UTC+3)			? 41' ? 83' ? 90+6'	Stadium: Arcul de Triumf; Referee: Istvan Kovacs (Carei)

5 August 2023 4	Universitatea Cluj	1 – 1	Dinamo București	Mediaș
21:30 EEST (UTC+3)	? 51'		Politic 15'	Stadium: Gaz Metan; Referee: Ovidiu Hațegan (Arad)

14 August 2023 5	Dinamo București	1 – 0	FC Botoșani	București
20:30 EEST (UTC+3)	Ducan 90+5' (o.g.)			Stadium: Arcul de Triumf; Referee: Adrian Cojocaru (Galați)

19 August 2023 6	FC Voluntari	2 – 3	Dinamo București	Voluntari
21:45 EEST (UTC+3)	? 18' ? 80'		Gregório 24'; Costin 46'; Larrucea 87'	Stadium: Anghel Iordănescu; Referee: Radu Petrescu (București)

26 August 2023 7	Dinamo București	1 – 1	Petrolul Ploiești	București
21:45 EEST (UTC+3)	Gregório 21'		? 37'	Stadium: Arcul de Triumf; Referee: Iulian Călin

1 September 2023 8	Rapid București	4 – 0	Dinamo București	București
21:30 EEST (UTC+3)	? 35' (pen.), 82' ? 56' ? 61'			Stadium: Rapid-Giulești; Referee: Horațiu Feșnic

15 September 2023 9	Dinamo București	0 – 1	FCU Craiova	București
21:30 EEST (UTC+3)			? 61'	Stadium: Arena Națională; Referee: Florin Andrei

22 September 2023 10	Dinamo București	0 – 2	Farul Constanța	București
21:30 EEST (UTC+3)			? 33' ? 90'	Stadium: Arcul de Triumf; Referee: Szabolcs Kovacs

29 September 2023 11	Oțelul Galați	1 – 0	Dinamo București	Galați
21:00 EEST (UTC+3)	N. Roșu 37' (o.g.)			Stadium: Oțelul; Referee: George Găman

8 October 2023 12	Dinamo București	1 – 1	CFR Cluj	București
21:30 EEST (UTC+3)	Abdallah 10'		? 58'	Stadium: Arena Națională; Referee: Ovidiu Hațegan

21 October 2023 13	FC Hermannstadt	4 – 0	Dinamo București	Sibiu
17:00 EEST (UTC+3)	? 5' ? 19' ? 53' ? 90+1'			Stadium: Municipal; Referee: Marcel Bîrsan

27 October 2023 14	Dinamo București	0 – 0	Politehnica Iași	București
20:30 EEST (UTC+3)				Stadium: Arena Națională; Referee: Rareș Vidican

6 November 2023 15	UTA Arad	2 – 1	Dinamo București	Oradea
18:00 EEST (UTC+3)	? 41' ? 90+4' (pen.)		Politic 8'	Stadium: Iuliu Bodola; Referee: Andrei Moroiţă

12 November 2023 16	Universitatea Craiova	1 – 0	Dinamo București	Craiova
16:00 EEST (UTC+3)	? 5'			Stadium: Ion Oblemenco; Referee: Andrei Chivulete

26 November 2023 17	Dinamo București	0 – 1	FCSB	București
20:30 EEST (UTC+3)			? 52'	Stadium: Arena Națională; Referee: Iulian Călin

4 December 2023 18	Sepsi Sfântu Gheorghe	2 – 1	Dinamo București	Sfântu Gheorghe
20:00 EEST (UTC+3)	? 11', 30'		Gregório 51'	Stadium: Sepsi Arena; Referee: Radu Petrescu

11 December 2023 19	Dinamo București	0 – 1	Universitatea Cluj	București
20:30 EEST (UTC+3)			? 4'	Stadium: Arcul de Triumf; Referee: Adrian Cojocaru

18 December 2023 20	FC Botoșani	0 – 2	Dinamo București	Botoșani
20:00 EEST (UTC+3)			Politic 23'; Abdallah 90'	Stadium: Municipal; Referee: Sebastian Colțescu

22 December 2023 21	Dinamo București	1 – 0	FC Voluntari	București
20:30 EEST (UTC+3)	Gregório 90+1' (pen.)			Stadium: Arcul de Triumf; Referee: Andrei Moroiță

20 January 2024 22	Petrolul Ploiești	1 – 0	Dinamo București	Ploiești
20:00 EEST (UTC+3)	? 80'			Stadium: Ilie Oană; Referee: Marian Barbu

27 January 2024 23	Dinamo București	1 – 2	Rapid București	București
20:00 EEST (UTC+3)	Abdallah 45+1'		? 42' ? 90'	Stadium: Arena Națională; Referee: George Găman

2 February 2024 24	FCU Craiova	2 – 1	Dinamo București	Craiova
20:00 EEST (UTC+3)	? 13' ? 52'		Politic 63'	Stadium: Ion Oblemenco; Referee: Adrian Cojocaru

12 February 2024 25	Farul Constanța	0 – 2	Dinamo București	Ovidiu
20:00 EEST (UTC+3)			Velkovski 29'; Politic 48'	Stadium: Viitorul; Referee: Marcel Bîrsan

18 February 2024 26	Dinamo București	3 – 1	Oțelul Galați	București
20:00 EEST (UTC+3)	Politic 3'; Gnahoré 34'; Abdallah 81' (pen.)		? 17' (pen.)	Stadium: Arcul de Triumf; Referee: Andrei Moroiţă

23 February 2024 27	CFR Cluj	4 – 0	Dinamo București	Cluj-Napoca
20:00 EEST (UTC+3)	? 52' ? 68' ? 79', 82'			Stadium: Dr. Constantin Rădulescu; Referee: Florin Andrei

27 February 2024 28	Dinamo București	1 – 0	FC Hermannstadt	București
18:30 EEST (UTC+3)	Gregório 25'			Stadium: Arcul de Triumf; Referee: Iulian Călin

1 March 2024 29	Politehnica Iași	0 – 0	Dinamo București	Iași
20:00 EEST (UTC+3)				Stadium: Emil Alexandrescu; Referee: Rareş Vidican

8 March 2024 30	Dinamo București	1 – 0	UTA Arad	București
20:00 EEST (UTC+3)	Gregório 20'			Stadium: Arcul de Triumf; Referee: Szabolcs Kovacs

==== Play-out round ====
===== Play-out table =====
Pos	Team	Pld	W	D	L	GF	GA	GD	Pts	Qualification or relegation
7	UTA Arad (Note: UTA Arad and Hermannstadt were ineligible to advance to the European competition play-offs because they did not receive a UEFA licence.)	9	5	2	2	15	11	+4	37	
8	Oțelul Galați	9	6	1	2	11	7	+4	36	Qualification to European competition play-offs
9	Hermannstadt	9	4	2	3	13	7	+6	34	
10	Universitatea Cluj	9	3	3	3	12	10	+2	33	Qualification to European competition play-offs
11	Petrolul Ploiești	9	3	2	4	8	14	−6	29	
12	Politehnica Iași	9	3	1	5	7	8	−1	27	
13	Dinamo București (O)	9	2	4	3	10	12	−2	25	Qualification to relegation play-offs
14	Botoșani (O)	9	4	2	3	11	11	0	25	Qualification to relegation play-offs
15	Voluntari (R)	9	2	4	3	11	10	+1	24	Relegation to Liga II
16	FCU 1948 Craiova (R)	9	1	3	5	8	16	−8	22	Relegation to Liga II

Source: Soccerway, FRF (in Romanian), LPF (in Romanian)
Rules for classification: 1) Points; 2) Points without rounding; 3) Points in the regular season; 4) Head-to-head points; 5) Head-to-head goal difference; 6) Head-to-head goals scored; 7) Goal difference; 8) Goals scored; 9) Play-off (only if needed to decide teams for relegation). (Note: only criteria 7 and 8 are applied to establish the classification during the competition.)
(O) Play-off winners; (R) Relegated

===== Matches =====
17 March 2024 1	FC Hermannstadt	3 – 0	Dinamo București	Sibiu
18:15 EEST (UTC+3)	? 38' ? 41' ? 45+1'			Stadium: Municipal; Referee: Ovidiu Hațegan

1 April 2024 2	Dinamo București	1 – 1	Petrolul Ploiești	București
20:30 EEST (UTC+3)	Moura 39'		? 90+13' (pen.)	Stadium: Arcul de Triumf; Referee: Horațiu Feșnic

8 April 2024 3	Oțelul Galați	1 – 0	Dinamo București	Galați
20:30 EEST (UTC+3)	? 90+3'			Stadium: Oțelul; Referee: Szabolcs Kovacs

14 April 2024 4	Dinamo București	1 – 0	Politehnica Iași	București
20:15 EEST (UTC+3)	Bani 90+3'			Stadium: Arcul de Triumf; Referee: Ovidiu Hațegan

20 April 2024 5	FCU Craiova	1 – 1	Dinamo București	Craiova
17:30 EEST (UTC+3)	? 90'		Milanov 43'	Stadium: Ion Oblemenco; Referee: Adrian Cojocaru

23 April 2024 6	FC Botoșani	2 – 1	Dinamo București	Botoșani
19:30 EEST (UTC+3)	Moura 13' (o.g.) ? 90+1'		Selmani 45+2'	Stadium: Municipal; Referee: George Găman

26 April 2023 7	Dinamo București	1 – 1	FC Voluntari	București
20:00 EEST (UTC+3)	Gnahoré 35'		? 37'	Stadium: Arcul de Triumf; Referee: Radu Petrescu

4 May 2024 8	Universitatea Cluj	3 – 3	Dinamo București	Cluj-Napoca
20:00 EEST (UTC+3)	? 6' ? 61' ? 90+1'		Bani 38'; Milanov 48'; Pavičić 88'	Stadium: Cluj Arena; Referee: Szabolcs Kovacs

12 May 2024 9	Dinamo București	2 – 0	UTA Arad	București
21:30 EEST (UTC+3)	Abdallah 14'; Patriche 18'			Stadium: Arcul de Triumf; Referee: Istvan Kovacs

=== Liga I promotion/relegation play-offs ===
20 May 2024 1st leg	Dinamo București	2 – 0	Csíkszereda Miercurea Ciuc	București
20:00 EEST (UTC+3)	Politic 46', 73'			Stadium: Arena Națională; Referee: Rareş Vidican

27 May 2024 2nd leg	Csíkszereda Miercurea Ciuc	0 – 0	Dinamo București	Miercurea Ciuc
20:00 EEST (UTC+3)				Stadium: Municipal; Referee: Horațiu Feşnic

=== Cupa României ===
29 August 2023 Play-off round	Metaloglobus București	1 – 2	Dinamo București	Târgoviște
19:00 EEST (UTC+3)	? 51'		Bani 78', 90+4'	Stadium: Eugen Popescu; Referee: George Roman

26 September 2023 Group stage	Dinamo București	1 – 1	FCU Craiova 1948	Bucharest
21:00 EEST (UTC+3)	Amzăr 18'		? 66' (pen.)	Stadium: Arena Națională; Referee: Horațiu Feşnic

3 November 2023 Group stage	Bihor Oradea	1 – 1	Dinamo București	Oradea
20:30 EEST (UTC+3)	? 83'		Grigore 48'	Stadium: Iuliu Bodola; Referee: Ionela Peşu

7 December 2023 Group stage	Dinamo București	3 – 3	Oțelul Galați	Bucharest
20:45 EEST (UTC+3)	Bena 22'; Amzăr 65'; Gregório 84'		? 25'; Bena 53' (o.g.) ? 57'	Stadium: Arcul de Triumf; Referee: George Găman

== Statistics ==
=== Appearances and goals ===
Players with no appearances are not included on the list.

As of match played 27 May 2024

No.	Pos	Nat	Player	Total		Liga I		Cupa României		Promotion play-off	
No.	Pos	Nat	Player	Apps	Goals	Apps	Goals	Apps	Goals	Apps	Goals
1	GK	(Slovenia) SVN	Golubović	44	0	39	0	3	0	2	0
2	DF	(Brazil) BRA	Moura	36	1	28+4	1	1+1	0	2	0
4	DF	(France) FRA	Bena	19	1	13+4	0	2	1		
7	FW	(Portugal) POR	Gregório	41	8	25+12	7	2	1	0+2	0
8	MF	(France) FRA	Gnahoré	18	2	14+2	2	0	0	2	0
9	FW	(Kosovo) KOS	Selmani	10	1	3+7	1	0	0		
10	MF	(Spain) ESP	Iglesias	36	0	12+19	0	3	0	0+2	0
15	DF	(Romania) ROU	D. Irimia	2	0	0	0	2	0		
16	MF	(Croatia) CRO	Ilić	25	0	18+5	0	1+1	0		
17	FW	(Romania) ROU	Politic	36	8	23+7	6	1+3	0	2	2
18	MF	(Croatia) CRO	Pavičić	20	1	18	1	0	0	2	0
19	FW	(Madagascar) MAD	Abdallah	40	5	24+11	5	2+1	0	2	0
20	FW	(Romania) ROU	Bordușanu	20	0	12+5	0	1	0	0+2	0
21	FW	(Moldova) MDA	Neagu	5	0	0+4	0	0	0	0+1	0
22	FW	(Romania) ROU	Bani	32	4	12+15	2	1+2	2	2	0
23	DF	(Romania) ROU	Patriche	33	1	27+2	1	3	0	1	0
24	DF	(North Macedonia) MKD	Velkovski	16	1	16	1	0	0		
27	DF	(Romania) ROU	Grigore	12	1	4+3	0	3	1	1+1	0
28	DF	(Togo) TOG	Homawoo	31	0	27+1	0	0+1	0	2	0
29	MF	(Romania) ROU	A. Irimia	5	0	0+4	0	0+1	0		
30	MF	(Romania) ROU	N. Roșu	26	0	12+11	0	1+2	0		
31	DF	(Romania) ROU	Amzăr	36	2	23+8	0	2+1	2	2	0
32	DF	(Guinea-Bissau) GNB	Ié	5	0	3+2	0	0	0		
77	MF	(Bulgaria) BUL	Milanov	17	2	12+3	2	0	0	2	0
98	DF	(Romania) ROU	Costin	33	1	19+9	1	1+2	0	0+2	0
Players sold, released or loaned out during the season:
5	DF	(Brazil) BRA	Alves	17	0	16	0	1	0		
6	MF	(Romania) ROU	I. Roșu	10	0	0+7	0	3	0		
8	MF	(Spain) ESP	Larrucea	16	1	12+2	1	1+1	0		
9	FW	(Romania) ROU	Țîră	10	0	1+8	0	1	0		
16	MF	(Romania) ROU	Crețu	2	0	0+1	0	1	0		
18	MF	(Romania) ROU	Borcea	4	0	1+2	0	1	0		
24	DF	(Romania) ROU	Giafer	7	0	4	0	3	0		
77	FW	(Romania) ROU	Florescu	1	0	0+1	0	0	0		
91	GK	(Bosnia and Herzegovina) BIH	Dujmović	1	0	0	0	1	0		
99	FW	(France) FRA	Ghezali	21	0	11+6	0	3+1	0		

=== Disciplinary record ===
Includes all competitive matches. The list is sorted by squad number when total cards are equal. Players with no cards not included in the list.

As of match played 20 April 2024

Rank	No.	Pos.	Nat.	Name	Liga I			Cupa României			Total		
Rank	No.	Pos.	Nat.	Name	Booked	(yellow card) (yellow-red card)	Sent off (straight red)	Booked	(yellow card) (yellow-red card)	Sent off (straight red)	Booked	(yellow card) (yellow-red card)	Sent off (straight red)
1	31	DF	(Romania)	Amzăr	10	0	0	0	0	0	10	0	0
2	17	FW	(Romania)	Politic	8	0	0	1	0	0	9	0	0
3	30	MF	(Romania)	N. Roșu	6	0	0	1	0	0	7	0	0
4	2	DF	(Brazil)	Moura	6	0	0	0	0	0	6	0	0
4	28	DF	(Togo)	Homawoo	6	0	0	0	0	0	6	0	0
5	23	DF	(Romania)	Patriche	4	0	0	1	0	0	5	0	0
6
6	4	DF	(France)	Bena	4	0	0	0	0	0	4	0	0
6	8	MF	(Spain)	Larrucea	4	0	0	0	0	0	4	0	0
6	16	MF	(Croatia)	Ilić	4	0	0	0	0	0	4	0	0
6	22	FW	(Romania)	Bani	4	0	0	0	0	0	4	0	0
7	5	DF	(Brazil)	Alves	3	0	0	0	0	0	3	0	0
7	7	FW	(Portugal)	Gregório	3	0	0	0	0	0	3	0	0
7	10	MF	(Spain)	Iglesias	3	0	0	0	0	0	3	0	0
8	1	GK	(Slovenia)	Golubović	2	0	0	0	0	0	2	0	0
8	20	FW	(Romania)	Bordușanu	2	0	0	0	0	0	2	0	0
8	24	DF	(North Macedonia)	Velkovski	2	0	0	0	0	0	2	0	0
8	99	FW	(France)	Ghezali	2	0	0	0	0	0	2	0	0
8	27	DF	(Romania)	Grigore	1	0	0	1	0	0	2	0	0
9	6	MF	(Romania)	I. Roșu	1	0	0	0	0	0	1	0	0
9	9	FW	(Romania)	Țîră	1	0	0	0	0	0	1	0	0
9	18	MF	(Croatia)	Pavičić	1	0	0	0	0	0	1	0	0
9	19	FW	(Madagascar)	Abdallah	1	0	0	0	0	0	1	0	0
9	32	DF	(Guinea-Bissau)	Ié	1	0	0	0	0	0	1	0	0
9	77	FW	(Romania)	Florescu	1	0	0	0	0	0	1	0	0
9	98	DF	(Romania)	Costin	1	0	0	0	0	0	1	0	0
Total					78	0	0	4	0	0	82	0	0

== Transfers ==
=== Transfers in ===
Date	Position	Nationality	Name	From	Fee	Ref.
1 July 2023	ST	(Madagascar)	Hakim Abdallah	(Belgium) RE Virton	Free	
1 July 2023	GK	(Slovenia)	Adnan Golubović	(Slovenia) FC Koper	Free	
1 July 2023	ST	(Portugal)	Gonçalo Gregório	(Portugal) UD Leiria	Free	
3 July 2023	RB	(Romania)	Cristian Costin	FC Voluntari	Free	
3 July 2023	RW	(Romania)	Dennis Politic	(Italy) US Cremonese	Free	
16 July 2023	CB	(Togo)	Josué Homawoo	(France) Red Star FC	Free	
27 July 2023	CM	(Croatia)	Christian Ilić	(Cyprus) Doxa Katokopias	Free	
29 July 2023	GK	(Romania)	Răzvan Began	FC Botoșani	Free	
4 August 2023	CB	(Brazil)	Lucas Alves	(Portugal) Portimonense SC	Free	
3 January 2024	CB	(North Macedonia)	Darko Velkovski	Free Agent	Free	
17 January 2024	LW	(Moldova)	Petru Neagu	(Moldova) CSF Bălți	Free	
17 January 2024	CM	(France)	Eddy Gnahoré	(Italy) Ascoli Calcio	Free	
19 January 2024	AM	(Bulgaria)	Georgi Milanov	Free Agent	Free	
23 January 2024	GK	(Moldova)	Dorian Railean	Chindia Târgoviște	Free	
10 February 2024	ST	(Kosovo)	Astrit Selmani	(Israel) Hapoel Be'er Sheva	Free	
18 February 2024	CB	(Guinea-Bissau)	Edgar Ié	(Turkey) İstanbul Başakşehir	Free	
15 April 2024	CM	(Romania)	Cristian Licsandru	Free Agent	Free	

=== Loans in ===
Date from	Position	Nationality	Name	From	Date until	Ref.
16 January 2024	CM	(Croatia)	Domagoj Pavičić	(Greece) Aris Thessaloniki	30 June 2024	

=== Transfers out ===
Date	Position	Nationality	Name	To	Fee	Ref.
30 June 2023	RB	(Romania)	Marius Tomozei	CS Mioveni	Released	
8 July 2023	RB	(Romania)	Alin Buleică	Free Agent	Released	
21 July 2023	ST	(Romania)	Ionuț Bobea	Universitatea Alba Iulia	Free	
29 July 2023	CB	(Romania)	David Țone	CS Dinamo București	Free	
29 July 2023	LW	(Romania)	Cristian Delciu	CS Dinamo București	Free	
9 August 2023	ST	(Romania)	Alexandru Pop	Concordia Chiajna	Undisclosed	
24 August 2023	CB	(Romania)	Yanis Cune	CS Dinamo București	Free	
31 August 2023	CM	(Romania)	Geani Crețu	CSM Alexandria	Released	
30 December 2023	ST	(Romania)	Cătălin Țîră	Free Agent	Released	
12 January 2024	GK	(Bosnia and Herzegovina)	Filip Dujmović	(Bosnia and Herzegovina) Željezničar Sarajevo	Released	
30 January 2024	CM	(Spain)	Gorka Larrucea	(Bulgaria) Etar Veliko Tarnovo	Released	
30 January 2024	RW	(France)	Lamine Ghezali	(Greece) Levadiakos	€50,000	
7 February 2024	CB	(Brazil)	Lucas Alves	(Vietnam) Nam Dinh FC	€65,000	
13 February 2024	CM	(Romania)	Iulian Roșu	Concordia Chiajna	Released	

=== Loans out ===
Date from	Position	Nationality	Name	To	Date until	Ref.
21 July 2023	GK	(Romania)	Denis Oncescu	Concordia Chiajna	30 June 2024	
24 July 2023	GK	(Romania)	Alexandru Stoian	Unirea Alba Iulia	30 June 2024	
24 July 2023	ST	(Romania)	Vlăduț Stanciu	Unirea Alba Iulia	30 June 2024	
13 August 2023	RW	(Romania)	Cristian Ionescu	CS Blejoi	30 June 2024	
24 August 2023	LW	(Romania)	Andrei Florescu	Progresul Spartac București	30 June 2024	
10 January 2024	CB	(Romania)	Deniz Giafer	CS Tunari	30 June 2024	
10 January 2024	AM	(Romania)	Valentin Borcea	CS Tunari	30 June 2024	
9 February 2024	LB	(Romania)	Alexandru Serafim	AFC Câmpulung Muscel	30 June 2024	
