= Alexandru Irimia =

Romanian footballer (born 2006)

Personal information
- Full name: Dragoș Alexandru Irimia
- Date of birth: 12 May 2006 (age 20)
- Place of birth: Bucharest, Romania
- Height: 1.77 m (5 ft 10 in)
- Position: Midfielder

Team information
- Current team: Metaloglobus București (on loan from Dinamo București)
- Number: 11

Youth career
- –2023: Dinamo București

Senior career*
Years	Team	Apps	(Gls)
2023–	Dinamo București	9	(0)
2024–2026	→ Metaloglobus București (loan)	44	(2)
2026–	→ Metaloglobus București (loan)	11	(0)

International career^{‡}
2024	Romania U18	1	(0)
2024–2025	Romania U19	2	(0)
2026–	Romania U20	1	(0)
- * Club domestic league appearances and goals as of 31 October 2026 ‡ National team caps and goals as of 31 March 2026

Dragoș Alexandru Irimia (born 12 May 2006) is a Romanian professional footballer who plays as a midfielder for Liga II club Metaloglobus București, on loan from Liga I club Dinamo București.

== Club career ==
=== Dinamo București ===
A product of the Dinamo București academy, he made his senior debut for the club on 27 February 2023, in a 6–0 victory against Unirea Constanța in Liga II, when he replaced Dani Iglesias in the 81st minute. He debuted in Liga 1 on 29 September 2023, in the match lost by Dinamo at Oțelul Galați with a score of 1–0, when he entered the field in the 74th minute when he replaced Valentin Borcea.

== Personal life ==
He is the twin brother of David, who plays for Liga I club Dinamo București.

== Career statistics ==
As of match played 31 October 2026

Appearances and goals by club, season and competition
Club	Season	League			Cupa României		Europe		Other		Total	
Club	Season	Division	Apps	Goals	Apps	Goals	Apps	Goals	Apps	Goals	Apps	Goals
Dinamo București	2022–23	Liga II	4	0	0	0	—		0	0	4	0
Dinamo București	2023–24	Liga I	4	0	1	0	—		0	0	5	0
Dinamo București	2024–25	Liga I	1	0	0	0	—		—		1	0
Dinamo București	2026–27	Liga I	0	0	—		—		—		0	0
Dinamo București	Total		9	0	1	0	—		0	0	10	0
Metaloglobus București (loan)	2024–25	Liga II	19	2	—		—		2 (Note: Appearances in Liga I promotion/relegation play-offs)	0	21	2
Metaloglobus București (loan)	2025–26	Liga I	25	0	2	0	—		—		27	0
Metaloglobus București (loan)	2026–27	Liga II	11	0	1	0	—		—		12	0
Metaloglobus București (loan)	Total		55	2	3	0	—		2	0	60	2
Career total			64	2	5	0	—		2	0	71	2
