= Costin Amzăr =

Romanian footballer

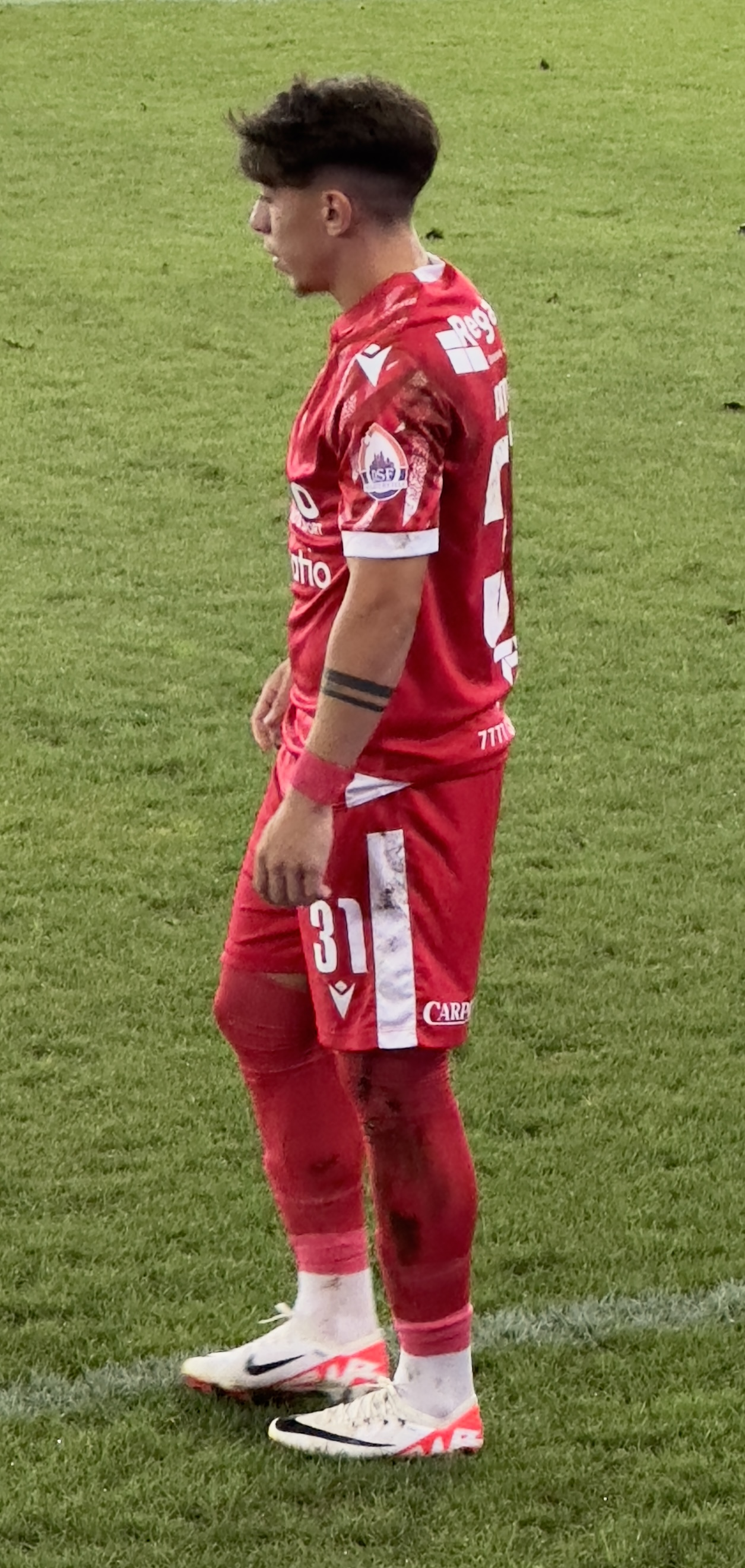
- Amzăr with Dinamo București in 2023

Personal information
- Full name: Costin Ionuț Amzăr
- Date of birth: 11 July 2003 (age 23)
- Place of birth: Bucharest, Romania
- Height: 1.70 m (5 ft 7 in)
- Position: Left-back

Youth career
- 2010–2017: Regal Sport București
- 2017–2021: Dinamo București

Senior career*
Years	Team	Apps	(Gls)
2021–2026	Dinamo București	70	(0)
2024–2026	→ Al-Nasr (loan)	24	(0)

International career^{‡}
2021–2022	Romania U19	10	(0)
2022–2023	Romania U20	6	(0)
2023–2025	Romania U21	6	(0)
- * Club domestic league appearances and goals as of 21 November 2025 ‡ National team caps and goals as of 17 June 2025

Costin Ionuț Amzăr (born 11 July 2003) is a Romanian professional footballer who plays as a left-back.

== Club career ==
Amzăr made his Liga I debut for Dinamo București against CS Mioveni on 16 August 2021.

== Style of play ==
Gabriel Răduță, the former head of Dinamo's Academy, said about Amzăr that he has similarities to Alphonso Davies due to his explosive pace remembering the period when he trained him: "He is a left back, but in juniors we put him in front as much as possible when we needed him, because he goes up and has a very good offensive contribution ”

== Career statistics ==
As of match played 5 December 2025

Appearances and goals by club, season and competition
Club	Season	League			National cup (Note: Includes Cupa României. UAE President's Cup)		Continental		Other		Total	
Club	Season	Division	Apps	Goals	Apps	Goals	Apps	Goals	Apps	Goals	Apps	Goals
Dinamo București	2021–22	Liga I	9	0	1	0	—		0	0	10	0
Dinamo București	2022–23	Liga II	25	0	3	1	—		2 (Note: Appearance in Liga I promotion/relegation play-offs)	0	30	1
Dinamo București	2023–24	Liga I	31	0	3	2	—		2	0	36	2
Dinamo București	2024–25	Liga I	5	0	0	0	—		—		5	0
Dinamo București	Total		70	0	7	3	—		4	0	81	3
Al-Nasr (loan)	2024–25	UAE Pro League	16	0	1	0	—		2 (Note: Appearances in UAE League Cup)	0	19	0
Al-Nasr (loan)	2025–26	UAE Pro League	8	0	1	0	—		5	0	14	0
Al-Nasr (loan)	Total		24	0	2	0	—		7	0	33	0
Career total			94	0	9	3	—		11	0	114	3
