= Geani Crețu =

Romanian footballer

Personal information
- Full name: Geani Mihai Crețu
- Date of birth: 12 January 2000 (age 26)
- Place of birth: Piatra Neamț, Romania
- Height: 1.77 m (5 ft 10 in)
- Position: Central midfielder

Team information
- Current team: Metalul Buzău
- Number: 9

Youth career
- –2016: Ceahlăul Piatra Neamț
- 2016–2019: Dinamo București

Senior career*
Years	Team	Apps	(Gls)
2018–2023	Dinamo București	42	(1)
2019–2020	→ Rapid București (loan)	14	(0)
2022–2023	→ Argeș Pitești (loan)	17	(0)
2023–2024	CSM Alexandria	14	(2)
2024–2026	Ceahlăul Piatra Neamț	49	(4)
2026–	Metalul Buzău	11	(1)
- * Club domestic league appearances and goals as of 31 October2026

Geani Mihai Crețu (born 12 January 2000) is a Romanian professional footballer who plays as a central midfielder for Liga II club Metalul Buzău.

== Club career ==
He made his debut in Liga I on 15 December 2018, in a match between Dinamo București and Universitatea Craiova, ended with the score of 3-0. He was released by Dinamo on 31 August 2023 after a poor performance in a Cupa României game against Metaloglobus. In September 2023, he signed a contract with Alexandria.

== Career statistics ==
As of match played 31 October 2026

Appearances and goals by club, season and competition
Club	Season	League			Cupa României		Europe		Other		Total	
Club	Season	Division	Apps	Goals	Apps	Goals	Apps	Goals	Apps	Goals	Apps	Goals
Dinamo București	2018–19	Liga I	1	0	0	0	—		—		1	0
Dinamo București	2019–20	Liga I	2	0	0	0	—		—		2	0
Dinamo București	2020–21	Liga I	14	0	1	0	—		—		15	0
Dinamo București	2021–22	Liga I	24	1	1	0	—		2 (Note: Appearances in Liga I promotion/relegation play-offs)	0	27	1
Dinamo București	2022–23	Liga II	1	0	—		—		—		1	0
Dinamo București	2023–24	Liga I	1	0	1	0	—		—		2	0
Dinamo București	Total		42	1	3	0	—		2	0	47	1
Rapid București (loan)	2019–20	Liga II	14	0	1	0	—		—		15	0
Argeș Pitești (loan)	2022–23	Liga I	17	0	4	0	—		—		21	0
CSM Alexandria	2023–24	Liga II	14	2	3	0	—		—		17	2
Ceahlăul Piatra Neamț	2024–25	Liga II	25	3	3	1	—		—		28	4
Ceahlăul Piatra Neamț	2025–26	Liga II	24	1	1	0	—		—		25	1
Ceahlăul Piatra Neamț	Total		49	4	4	1	—		—		53	4
Metalul Buzău	2023–24	Liga II	11	1	2	0	—		—		13	1
Career total			147	8	17	1	0	0	2	0	166	9
