= Deniz Giafer =

Romanian footballer

Personal information
- Date of birth: 11 May 2001 (age 25)
- Place of birth: Constanța, Romania
- Height: 1.85 m (6 ft 1 in)
- Position: Centre-back

Team information
- Current team: 1599 Șelimbăr
- Number: 24

Youth career
- 2009–2010: Gheorghe Hagi Academy
- 2010–2021: Dinamo București

Senior career*
Years	Team	Apps	(Gls)
2021–2024	Dinamo București	47	(2)
2024	→ Tunari (loan)	8	(0)
2024–2026	Bihor Oradea	13	(0)
2025–2026	→ 1599 Șelimbăr (loan)	20	(0)
2026–	1599 Șelimbăr	6	(0)

International career
2017	Romania U16	2	(0)
2021	Romania U20	5	(1)
- * Club domestic league appearances and goals as of 31 October 2026

Deniz Giafer (Dobrujan Tatar: Deñíz Ğafer; born 11 May 2001) is a Romanian professional footballer who plays as a centre back for Liga II club 1599 Șelimbăr.

== Club career ==
=== Dinamo București ===
While a junior at Dinamo in 2017, Giafer traveled to Portugal club Benfica for a trial and he came close to sign for them, but the transfer failed due to Dinamo's demands. He made his Liga I debut for Dinamo București against FC Voluntari on 19 July 2021.

== Career statistics ==
As of match played 31 October 2026

Appearances and goals by club, season and competition
Club	Season	League			Cupa României		Europe		Other		Total	
Club	Season	Division	Apps	Goals	Apps	Goals	Apps	Goals	Apps	Goals	Apps	Goals
Dinamo București	2021–22	Liga I	15	0	0	0	—		0	0	15	0
Dinamo București	2022–23	Liga II	28	2	5	0	—		2 (Note: Appearances in Liga I promotion/relegation play-offs)	0	35	2
Dinamo București	2023–24	Liga I	4	0	3	0	—		—		7	0
Dinamo București	Total		47	2	8	0	—		2	0	57	2
Tunari (loan)	2023–24	Liga II	8	0	—		—		—		8	0
Bihor Oradea	2024–25	Liga II	13	0	1	0	—		—		14	0
1599 Șelimbăr (loan)	2024–25	Liga II	7	0	—		—		—		7	0
1599 Șelimbăr (loan)	2025–26	Liga II	13	0	1	0	—		2 (Note: Appearances in Liga II relegation play-offs)	0	16	0
1599 Șelimbăr	2026–27	Liga II	6	0	1	0	—		—		7	0
1599 Șelimbăr	Total		26	0	2	0	—		—		28	0
Career total			94	2	11	0	—		4	0	109	2

== Personal life ==
He is of Tatar ethnicity.
