= David Irimia =

Romanian footballer

Personal information
- Full name: David Mario Irimia
- Date of birth: 12 May 2006 (age 20)
- Place of birth: Bucharest, Romania
- Height: 1.77 m (5 ft 10 in)
- Position: Right back

Team information
- Current team: Dinamo București
- Number: 20

Youth career
- –2023: Dinamo București

Senior career*
Years	Team	Apps	(Gls)
2023–	Dinamo București	21	(0)
2024–2026	→ Metaloglobus București (loan)	50	(7)

International career^{‡}
2024	Romania U19	6	(0)
2025–	Romania U20	6	(0)
2026–	Romania U21	1	(0)
- * Club domestic league appearances and goals as of 6 November 2026 ‡ National team caps and goals as of 17 November 2026

David Mario Irimia (born 12 May 2006) is a Romanian professional footballer who plays as a right back for Liga I club Dinamo București.

== Personal life ==
He is the twin brother of Alexandru, who plays for Metaloglobus București.

== Career statistics ==
As of match played 6 November 2026

Appearances and goals by club, season and competition
Club	Season	League			Cupa României		Europe		Other		Total	
Club	Season	Division	Apps	Goals	Apps	Goals	Apps	Goals	Apps	Goals	Apps	Goals
Dinamo București	2022–23	Liga II	7	0	0	0	—		0	0	7	0
Dinamo București	2023–24	Liga I	0	0	2	0	—		0	0	2	0
Dinamo București	2026–27	Liga I	14	0	0	0	—		—		14	0
Dinamo București	Total		21	0	2	0	—		0	0	23	0
Metaloglobus București (loan)	2024–25	Liga II	25	5	0	0	—		2 (Note: Appearances in Liga I promotion/relegation play-offs)	0	27	5
Metaloglobus București (loan)	2025–26	Liga I	25	2	2	0	—		—		27	2
Metaloglobus București (loan)	Total		50	7	2	0	—		2	0	54	7
Career total			71	7	4	0	—		2	0	77	7
