= Cașin Church =

- Biserica Cașin
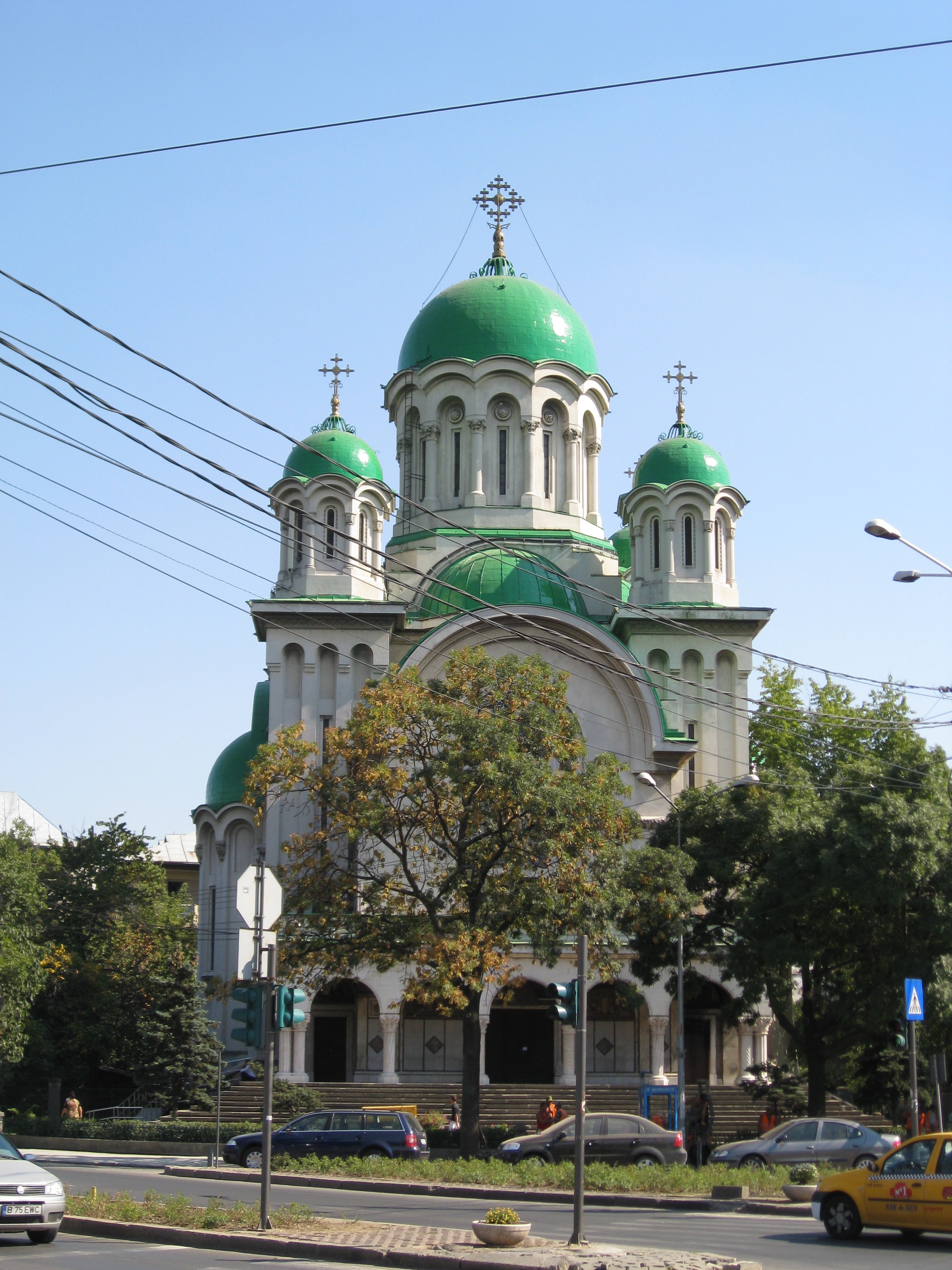
- Cașin Church
- 44.46754°N 26.07500°E
- Location: Bucharest
- Country: Romania
- Denomination: Eastern Orthodox

Architecture
- Functional status: active
- Style: Romanian Revival
- Groundbreaking: 1937
- Completed: 1938

Specifications
- Length: 42 metres (138 ft)
- Width: 29 metres (95 ft)
- Height: 50 metres (160 ft)

Cașin Church (Romanian: Biserica Cașin), sometimes referred to as Cașin Monastery (Mănăstirea Cașin), is a Romanian Orthodox church located in Bucharest, at a large intersection a block away from Arcul de Triumf. It is dedicated to the Archangels Michael and Gabriel.

== History ==
Plans for the church's construction were made in 1935 by a parish council that included Gheorghe Ionescu-Sisești, a professor at the Agronomic Institute, the writer Vasile Militaru and the architect I. Bălănescu. At Father Dumitru I. Manta's urging, funds for the project were obtained through significant donations from the Ministry of Agriculture and Domains and from monthly subscriptions given by families and institutions. Several donations came from General Ion Antonescu.

Dimitrie Ionescu-Berechet, chief architect of the Romanian Patriarchate, won a contest to design the church, to be built on land donated by Bucharest City Hall. The cornerstone was laid in August 1937, and the structure complete in March 1938. Work then stopped but was resumed in 1946–1959. The church combines the Brâncovenesc style, with its entrance columns, with Byzantine architecture, as seen in the mosaics, the centred Greek cross plan and the high and spacious interior.

The marble and alabaster iconostasis, with icons in mosaic, was done from 1952 to 1959, following Ionescu-Berechet's plans and with contributions from artists Ion Dimitriu-Bârlad, Constantin Baraschi, and Mihai Wagner. Between 1962 and 1971, the walls and floors were covered in 3 m high white and rose marble plates, a balcony for the choir was installed, and large mosaic icons of Murano glass placed at eye level along the walls. Repairs were done in 2002–2003, and the domes, formerly copper green, were painted bright green in 2008.

This church's name refers to the valley of Cașin, in Bacău County, a place where history combines with myth.

== Description ==
The church, measuring 42 x 29 m, has three apses, and the highest dome reaches 50 metres (160 ft). Its surface area is 780 square metres (8,400 sq ft). The altar apse is semicircular and is surrounded by an open, arched portico. A large polygonal dome rises above the nave; its windows are arched and it has small columns all around. Four smaller octagonal domes of similar design surround the main one. The vestibule features a large arch; in the centre of its exterior there is a large mosaic featuring Michael and Gabriel, surrounded by ornamentation.

Twelve stone steps lead up to an open area outside the entrance, surrounded by five frontal and two side arches supported by pairs of short white marble columns decorated with old Romanian patterns. The outside wall to the left and right of the entrance doors is also plated with marble and, above, decorated with mosaic icons. The doors have bronze bas-reliefs of Michael and Gabriel as well as Saints Peter and Paul.

As usual in Orthodox churches, the inside of the main dome is painted with Christ Pantocrator. The arches and walls of the sanctuary are entirely decorated in Murano glass, a first for Romania. The altar apse, noticeably raised, appears lit in green, in contrast to the white marble with which the iconostasis is plated.

In front of the church, a bust of Marshal Alexandru Averescu was placed in 2018.

== Gallery ==
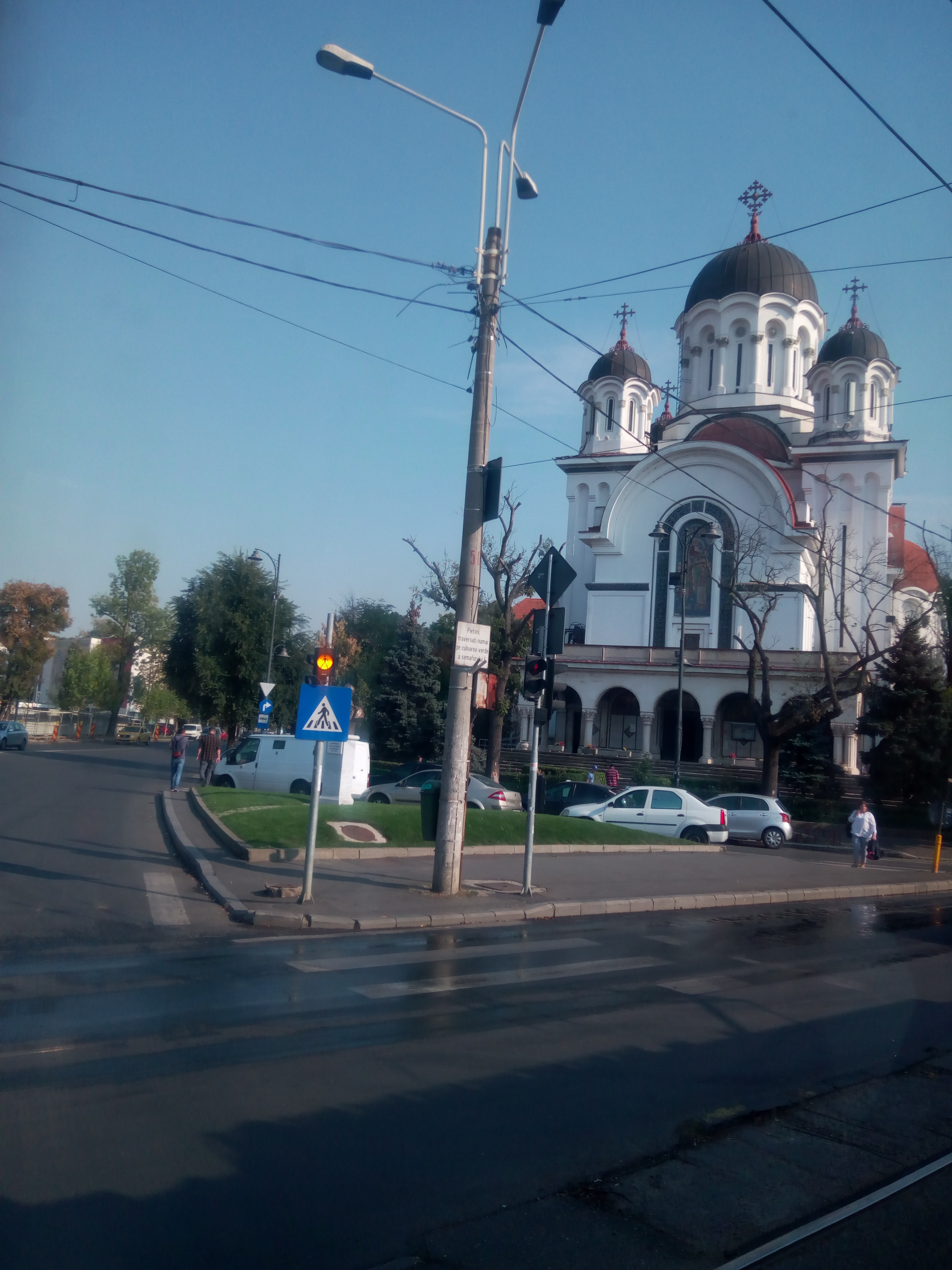

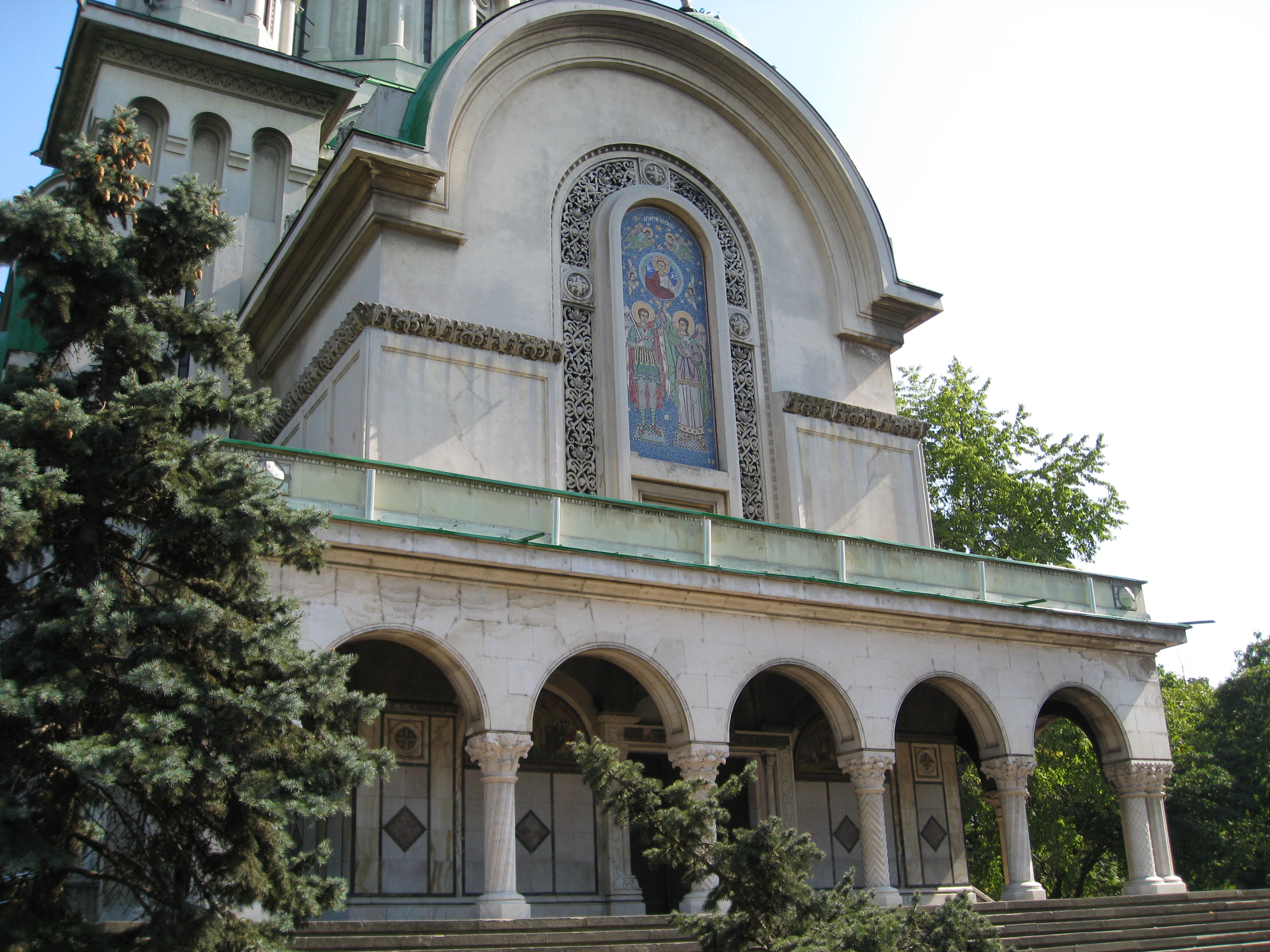

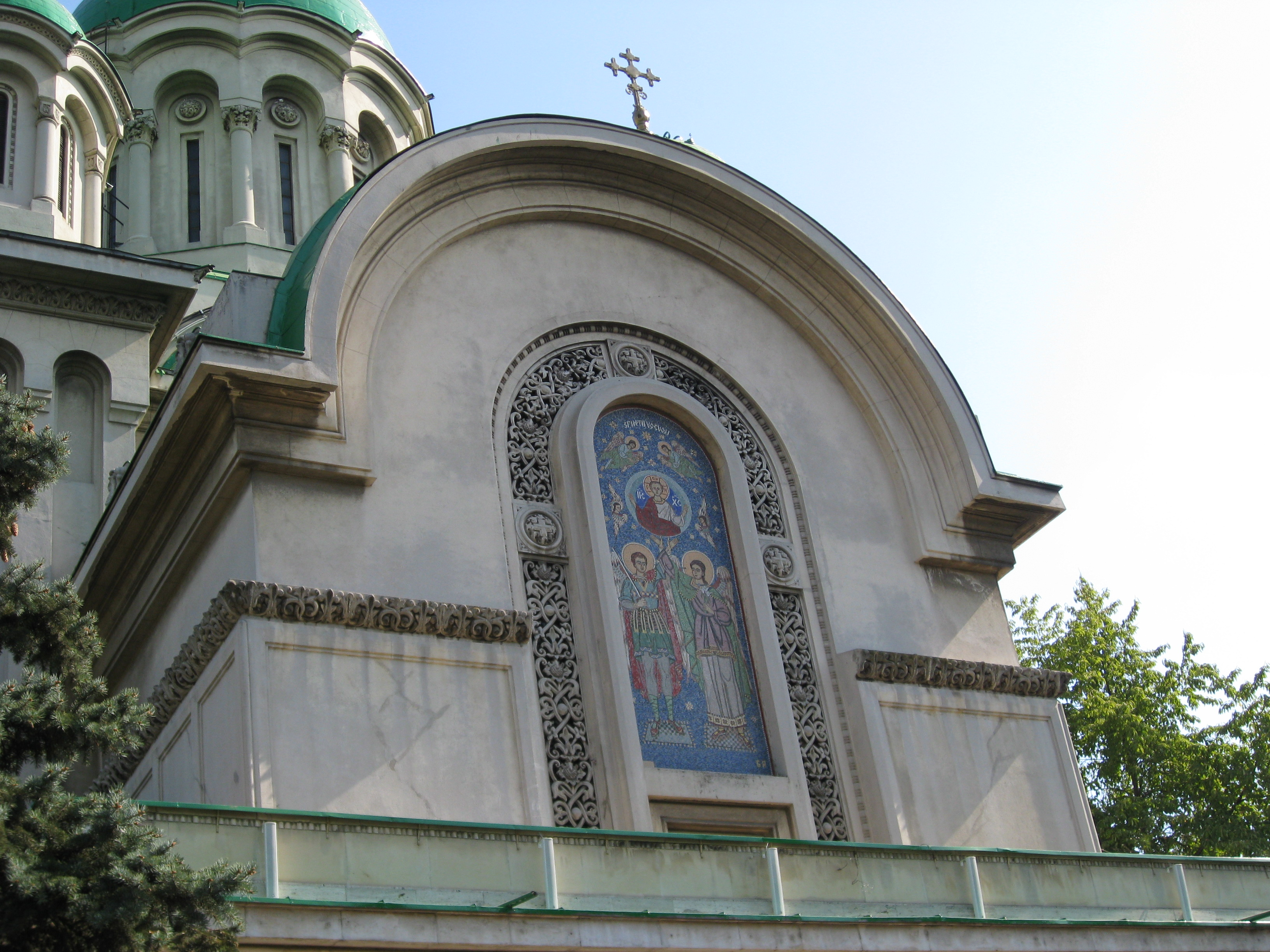

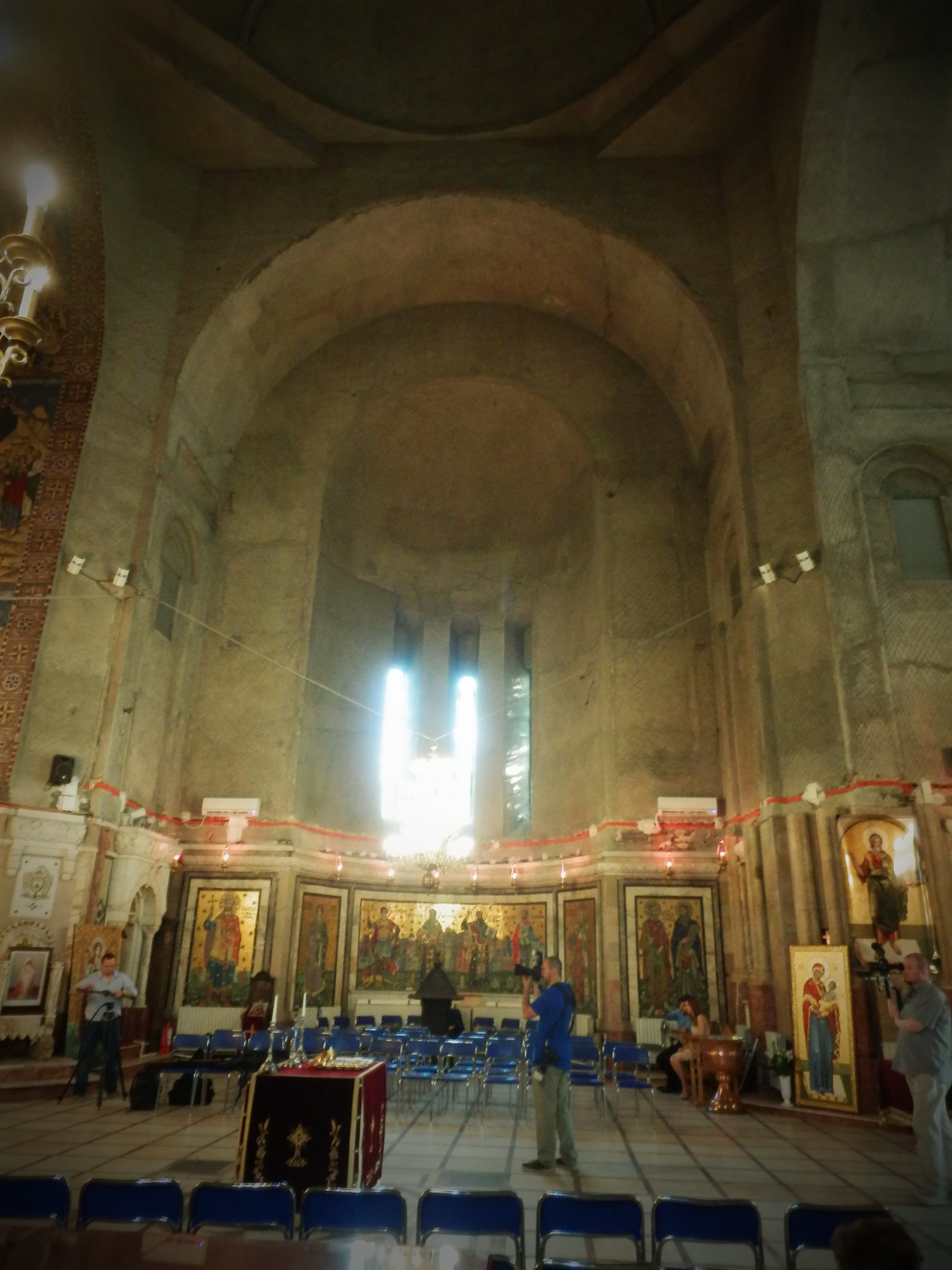

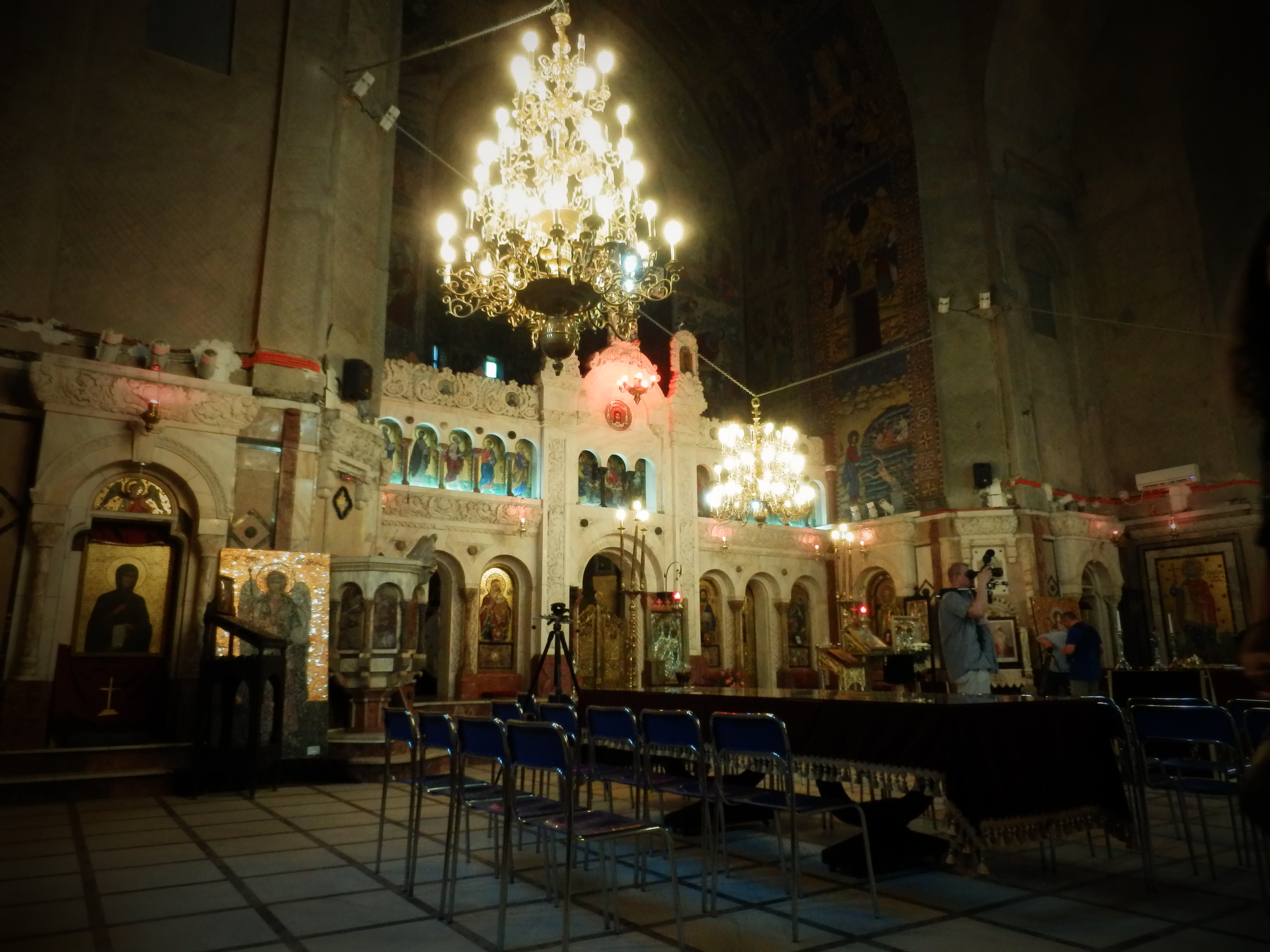

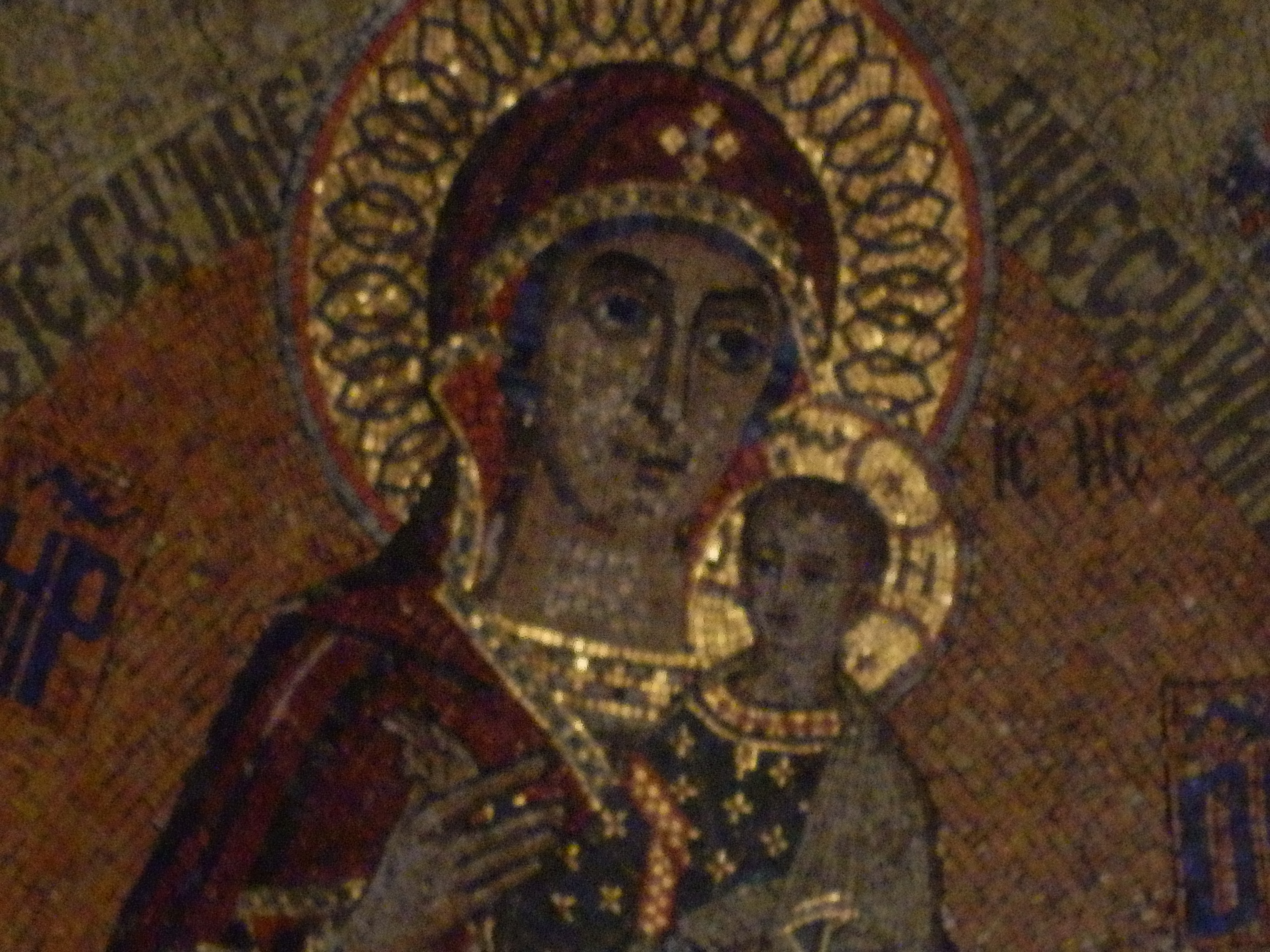
