= Arcul de Triumf Stadium (2021) =

Sports venue in Bucharest, Romania

Coordinates: 44°28′08″N 26°04′30″E

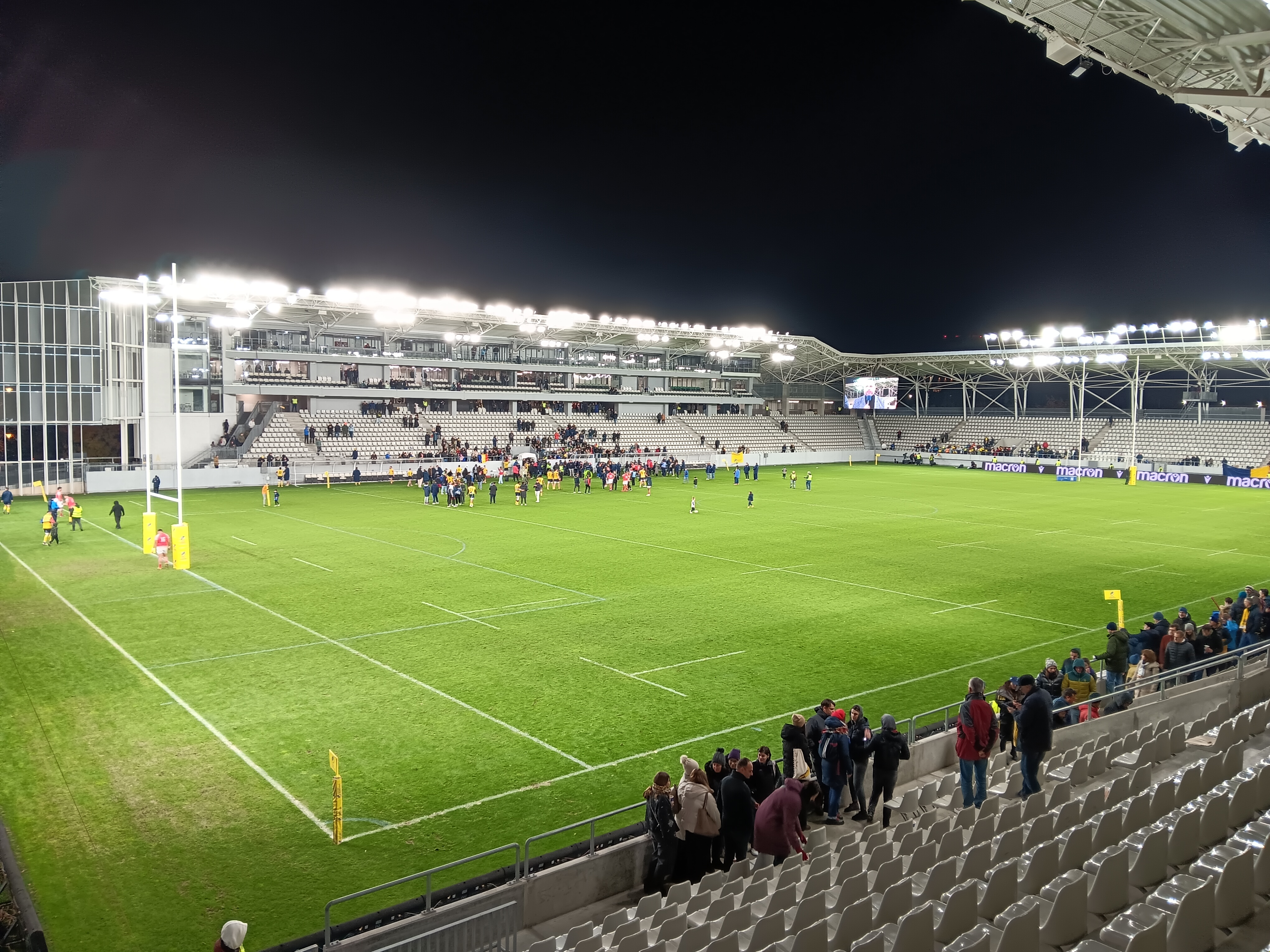
- UEFA
- Interactive map of Arcul de Triumf Stadium
- Full name: Arcul de Triumf National Rugby Stadium
- Former names: Stadionul Tineretului
- Address: 18-20 Mărăști Boulevard, Sector 1
- Location: Bucharest, Romania
- Operator: National Sports Agency
- Capacity: 8,207
- Surface: Grass
- Field size: 38,000 sq m

Construction
- Groundbreaking: June 2019
- Opened: 3 July 2021
- Cost: €36.92 million
- General contractor: CNI

Tenant
- Romania national rugby union team (2021–present)

Website
- https://csnarculdetriumf.ro/

The Arcul de Triumf National Rugby Stadium is a multi-purpose stadium in Bucharest, Romania. Being constructed on the site of the former stadium, it mostly hosts home matches of the Romania national rugby union team. It was originally planned to host games at the 2021 UEFA European Under-19 Championship, but the tournament was cancelled due to the COVID-19 pandemic.

It is named after the nearby triumphal arch in Bucharest. Nearby is also the Cașin Monastery.

Austria, France and Ukraine's squads were based at the stadium during preparation for (and between matches at) UEFA Euro 2020.

The first sporting event held at the stadium was on 3 July 2021 when a rugby union crowd of 4,400 watched the summer internationals header featuring Romania v Argentina, which ended with a 17–24 loss.
