= Neluț Roșu =

Romanian footballer

Personal information
- Full name: Neluț Stelian Roșu
- Date of birth: 5 July 1993 (age 33)
- Place of birth: Cluj-Napoca, Romania
- Height: 1.75 m (5 ft 9 in)
- Position: Central midfielder

Team information
- Current team: Tunari
- Number: 29

Youth career
- –2012: CFR Cluj

Senior career*
Years	Team	Apps	(Gls)
2012–2013	Luceafărul Oradea	8	(1)
2013	→ Concordia Chiajna (loan)	4	(0)
2013–2017	Concordia Chiajna	71	(10)
2015	→ Botoșani (loan)	13	(1)
2015	→ CFR Cluj (loan)	7	(0)
2017	Viitorul Constanța	14	(0)
2017–2018	Levski Sofia	7	(0)
2018–2019	Astra Giurgiu	32	(5)
2019–2020	Gaz Metan Mediaș	23	(1)
2020–2021	UTA Arad	26	(0)
2021–2022	Voluntari	4	(0)
2022	→ Concordia Chiajna (loan)	13	(0)
2022–2024	Dinamo București	50	(0)
2024–2025	Oțelul Galați	18	(0)
2025–	Tunari	22	(0)
- * Club domestic league appearances and goals as of 9 May 2026

Neluț Stelian Roșu (born 5 July 1993) is a Romanian professional footballer who plays as a central midfielder for Liga II club Tunari.

== Career ==
In January 2017, Roșu joined Viitorul Constanța where he contributed for the club's 2016–17 Liga I title, appearing 14 times for the team.

On 4 July 2017, Roșu moved abroad to sign with Bulgarian club Levski Sofia on a three-year deal for a reported fee of €100,000. He left the club by mutual consent at the end of 2017–18 season.

On 21 June 2018, Roșu signed with Astra Giurgiu.

In January 2022, he was loaned at Concordia Chiajna.

He joined Dinamo București in July 2022. He was released at the end of the 2023–24 season.

== Honours ==
Concordia Chiajna

- Cupa Ligii runner-up: 2015–16

Viitorul Constanța

- Liga I: 2016–17

Levski Sofia

- Bulgarian Cup runner-up: 2017–18

Astra Giurgiu

- Cupa României runner-up: 2018–19
