= Ricardo Grigore =

Romanian footballer (born 1999)

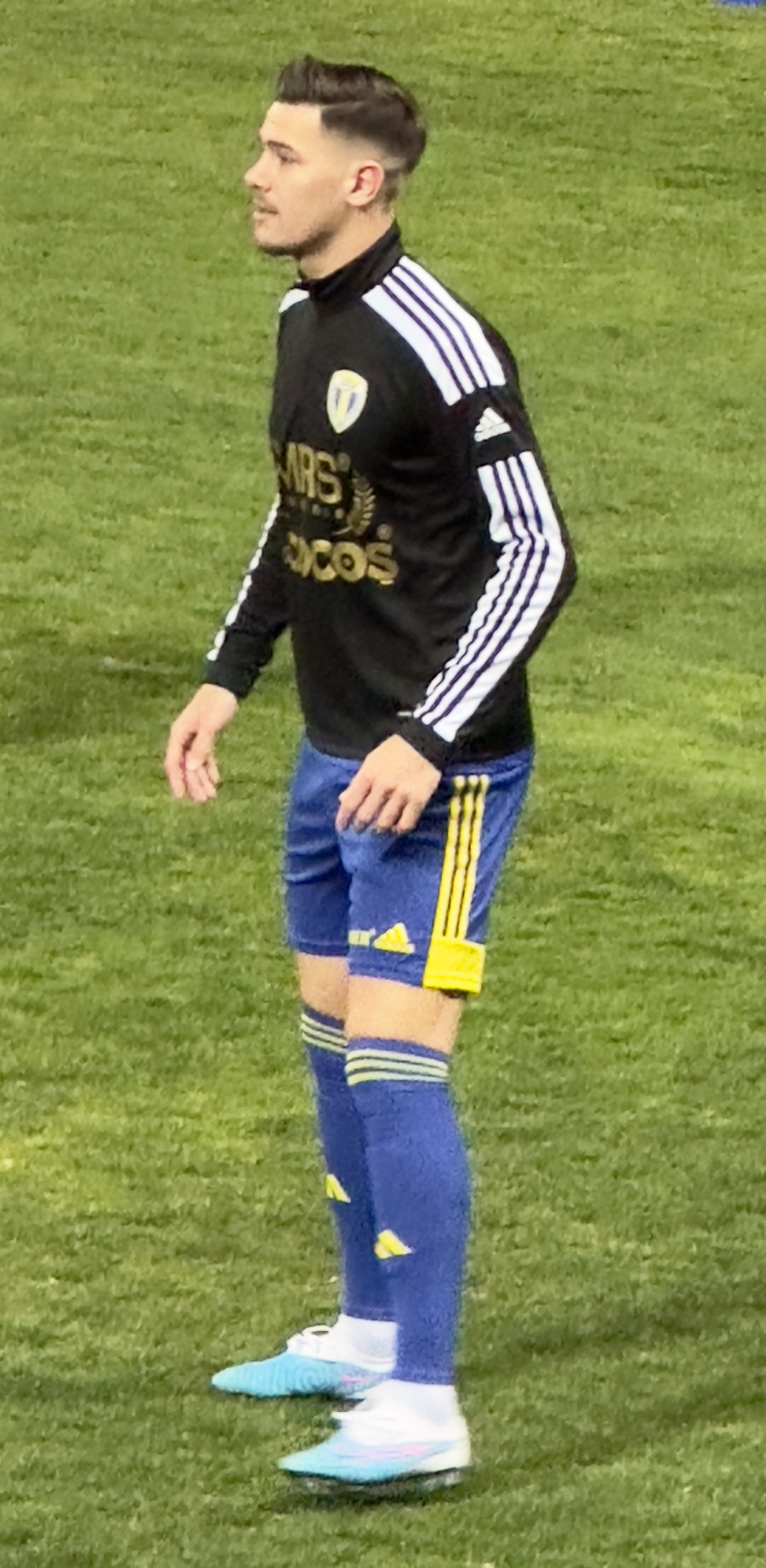
- Grigore with Petrolul Ploiești in 2023

Personal information
- Full name: Ricardo Florin Grigore
- Date of birth: 7 April 1999 (age 27)
- Place of birth: Bucharest, Romania
- Height: 1.91 m (6 ft 3 in)
- Position: Centre-back

Youth career
- 2005–2007: Galaxy Team București
- 2007–2018: Dinamo București

Senior career*
Years	Team	Apps	(Gls)
2018–2024	Dinamo București	97	(5)
2022–2023	→ FC U Craiova (loan)	10	(0)
2023	→ Petrolul Ploiești (loan)	3	(0)
2024–2025	Eldense	2	(1)
2025–2026	Tunari	6	(1)
2026	Avilés Industrial	6	(0)

International career
2016	Romania U17	2	(0)
2017–2018	Romania U19	2	(0)
2018–2021	Romania U21	5	(0)
2021	Romania Olympic	5	(0)
- * Club domestic league appearances and goals as of 14 March 2026

Ricardo Florin Grigore (born 7 April 1999) is a Romanian professional footballer who plays as a centre-back.

== Club career ==
Born in Bucharest, Grigore joined the academy of Dinamo București at age eight. On 3 April 2018, shortly before turning 19, he made his professional debut in a 1–0 Liga I away victory over Botoșani.

On 15 July 2022, following Dinamo București's relegation to the Liga II, FC U Craiova announced the signing of Grigore on a three-year contract, although it was later revealed to be a loan. On 9 March 2023, after terminating his deal with FC U Craiova, he signed a contract until the end of the season with fellow Liga I team Petrolul Ploiești.

Grigore returned to Dinamo for the 2023–24 season, but after only seven games played, he was released at the end of the year. On 7 August 2024, he signed a one-year deal with Spanish Segunda División side CD Eldense. Grigore was released from his Eldense contract on 3 February 2025.

== International career ==
In June 2021, Grigore was selected by manager Mirel Rădoi in Romania's squad for the postponed 2020 Summer Olympics.

== Career statistics ==
As of match played 14 March 2026

Appearances and goals by club, season and competition
Club	Season	League			National cup (Note: Includes Cupa României, Copa del Rey)		Continental		Other		Total	
Club	Season	Division	Apps	Goals	Apps	Goals	Apps	Goals	Apps	Goals	Apps	Goals
Dinamo București	2017–18	Liga I	6	1	0	0	0	0	—		6	1
Dinamo București	2018–19	Liga I	26	1	2	1	—		—		28	2
Dinamo București	2019–20	Liga I	18	2	4	1	—		—		22	3
Dinamo București	2020–21	Liga I	20	1	4	0	—		—		24	1
Dinamo București	2021–22	Liga I	20	0	2	0	—		0	0	22	0
Dinamo București	2023–24	Liga I	7	0	3	1	—		2 (Note: Appearance in Liga I promotion/relegation play-offs)	0	12	1
Dinamo București	Total		97	5	15	3	0	0	2	0	114	8
FC U Craiova (loan)	2022–23	Liga I	10	0	3	0	—		—		13	0
Petrolul Ploiești (loan)	2022–23	Liga I	3	0	—		—		—		3	0
Eldense	2024–25	Segunda División	2	1	2	0	—		—		4	1
Tunari	2025–26	Liga II	6	1	—		—		—		6	1
Avilés Industrial	2025–26	Primera Federación	6	0	—		—		—		6	0
Career total			124	7	18	3	0	0	2	0	144	10
