= Valentin Borcea =

Romanian professional footballer

Personal information
- Full name: Valentin Ioan Borcea
- Date of birth: 6 July 2002 (age 24)
- Place of birth: Bucharest, Romania
- Height: 1.75 m (5 ft 9 in)
- Position: Attacking midfielder

Team information
- Current team: Unirea Alba Iulia

Youth career
- 2008–2010: Pro Progresul Ilie Rontea
- 2010–2020: Dinamo București

Senior career*
Years	Team	Apps	(Gls)
2020–2024	Dinamo București	33	(3)
2024	→ Tunari (loan)	8	(2)
2024–2025	UTA Arad	0	(0)
2025	Politehnica Iași	0	(0)
2025	CS Dinamo București	0	(0)
2025–	Unirea Alba Iulia	0	(0)

International career
2018	Romania U16	1	(0)
2019	Romania U17	3	(0)
- * Club domestic league appearances and goals as of 11 May 2024

Valentin Ioan Borcea (born 6 July 2002) is a Romanian professional footballer who plays as an attacking midfielder for Liga III club Unirea Alba Iulia.

== Career statistics ==
As of match played 26 February 2025

Appearances and goals by club, season and competition
Club	Season	League			Cupa României		Europe		Other		Total	
Club	Season	Division	Apps	Goals	Apps	Goals	Apps	Goals	Apps	Goals	Apps	Goals
Dinamo Bucuresti	2019–20	Liga I	1	0	1	0	—		—		2	0
Dinamo Bucuresti	2020–21	Liga I	9	0	0	0	—		—		9	0
Dinamo Bucuresti	2021–22	Liga I	5	0	0	0	—		0	0	5	0
Dinamo Bucuresti	2022–23	Liga II	15	3	3	0	—		1 (Note: Appearance in Liga I promotion/relegation play-offs)	0	19	3
Dinamo Bucuresti	2023–24	Liga I	3	0	1	0	—		—		4	0
Dinamo Bucuresti	Total		33	3	5	0	—		1	0	39	3
Tunari (loan)	2023–24	Liga II	8	2	—		—		—		8	2
UTA Arad	2024–25	Liga I	0	0	0	0	—		—		0	0
Politehnica Iași	2024–25	Liga I	0	0	1	0	—		—		1	0
CS Dinamo București	2025–26	Liga II	0	0	0	0	—		—		0	0
Unirea Alba Iulia	2025–26	Liga III	0	0	—		—		—		0	0
Career total			41	5	6	0	—		1	0	48	5
