= Gorka Larrucea =

Spanish footballer (born 1993)

Personal information
- Full name: Gorka Larrucea Arrien
- Date of birth: 24 February 1993 (age 33)
- Place of birth: Guernica, Spain
- Height: 1.82 m (6 ft 0 in)
- Position: Midfielder

Team information
- Current team: Kuala Lumpur City
- Number: 24

Youth career
- –2011: Gernika

Senior career*
Years	Team	Apps	(Gls)
2011–2019	Gernika	211	(18)
2019–2020	Real Unión	20	(0)
2020–2022	Amorebieta	45	(3)
2022–2024	Dinamo București	35	(5)
2024	Etar Veliko Tarnovo	12	(0)
2024	Sabail	22	(3)
2025–	Kuala Lumpur City	1	(0)
- * Club domestic league appearances and goals as of 10 August 2025

Gorka Larrucea Arrien (born 24 February 1993) is a Spanish professional footballer who plays as a central midfielder who plays for Malaysia Super League club Kuala Lumpur City.

== Club career ==
Larrucea was born in Guernica, Biscay, Basque Country. He finished his formation with hometown club Gernika Club. He made his first team debut in the 2010–11 season, in Tercera División.

Larrucea subsequently became a regular starter for the club, achieving promotion to Segunda División B in 2015.

On 2 July 2019, he moved to fellow third division side Real Unión on a one-year contract.

On 22 July 2020, Larrucea joined SD Amorebieta also in the third level, and was a regular during the campaign as his side achieved a first-ever promotion to Segunda División. He made his professional debut on 14 August 2021, starting in a 0–2 away loss against Girona FC.

In August 2022, he signed a contract with Romanian club Dinamo București. He was released in January 2024.

== Personal life ==
Larrucea's older brother Ander is also a footballer. A left back, both played together at Gernika for four years.
