= Andrei Florescu =

Romanian footballer

Personal information
- Date of birth: 30 May 2002 (age 24)
- Place of birth: Bucharest, Romania
- Height: 1.80 m (5 ft 11 in)
- Position: Left winger

Team information
- Current team: Afumați
- Number: 22

Youth career
- –2020: Dinamo București

Senior career*
Years	Team	Apps	(Gls)
2020–2025	Dinamo București	12	(0)
2020–2021	→ Metaloglobus București (loan)	15	(0)
2021–2022	→ Metaloglobus București (loan)	10	(1)
2023–2024	→ Progresul Spartac (loan)	22	(3)
2025	CSM Reșița	5	(1)
2025	San Marino	1	(0)
2026–	Afumați	7	(0)
- * Club domestic league appearances and goals as of 25 April 2026

Andrei Florescu (born 30 May 2002) is a Romanian professional footballer who plays as a left winger for Liga II club Afumați.

== Career ==
Florescu made his Liga I debut for Dinamo București against FC Voluntari on 19 July 2021. He was loaned at Metaloglobus București for two seasons. To gain first-team experience, he spent multiple loan stints at Liga II clubs, including Metoglobus București (2020–2022) and Progresul Spartac (2023–2024), where he scored 3 league goals.

== Career statistics ==
As of match played 25 April 2026

Appearances and goals by club, season and competition
Club	Season	League			National Cup (Note: Includes Cupa României)		Europe		Other (Note: Appearances in Liga I promotion play-off)		Total	
Club	Season	Division	Apps	Goals	Apps	Goals	Apps	Goals	Apps	Goals	Apps	Goals
Metaloglobus București (loan)	2020–21	Liga II	15	0	1	0	–		–		16	0
Metaloglobus București (loan)	2021–22	Liga II	10	1	0	0	–		–		10	1
Metaloglobus București (loan)	Total		25	1	1	0	0	0	0	0	26	1
Dinamo București	2021–22	Liga I	4	0	–		–		–		4	0
Dinamo București	2022–23	Liga II	7	0	2	0	–		2	0	11	0
Dinamo București	2023–24	Liga I	1	0	–		–		–		1	0
Dinamo București	2024–25	Liga I	0	0	1	0	–		–		1	0
Dinamo București	Total		12	0	3	0	0	0	2	0	17	0
Progresul Spartac (loan)	2023–24	Liga II	22	3	–		–		–		22	3
CSM Reșița	2024–25	Liga II	5	1	2	0	–		–		7	1
San Marino	2025–26	Serie D	1	0	–		–		–		1	0
Afumați	2025–26	Liga II	7	0	–		–		–		7	0
Career total			73	5	6	0	0	0	2	0	81	5
