= Filip Dujmović =

Bosnian footballer (born 1999)

Personal information
- Date of birth: 12 March 1999 (age 27)
- Place of birth: Livno, Bosnia and Herzegovina
- Height: 1.91 m (6 ft 3 in)
- Position: Goalkeeper

Team information
- Current team: Milsami Orhei
- Number: 31

Youth career
- Sloga Uskoplje
- –2016: Zrinjski Mostar
- 2017–2018: Željezničar
- 2018–2019: Adana Demirspor

Senior career*
Years	Team	Apps	(Gls)
2020	Mladost Doboj Kakanj	0	(0)
2020	→ Spartak Subotica (loan)	4	(0)
2020–2022	Spartak Subotica	36	(0)
2022	Radnički Niš	16	(0)
2022–2024	Dinamo București	14	(0)
2024	Željezničar	0	(0)
2024–2025	Struga	3	(0)
2025–	Milsami Orhei	15	(0)

International career
2016	Bosnia and Herzegovina U17	2	(0)
2020	Bosnia and Herzegovina U21	1	(0)
- * Club domestic league appearances and goals as of 1 June 2026

Filip Dujmović (born 12 March 1999) is a Bosnian professional footballer who plays as a goalkeeper for Moldovan Liga club Milsami Orhei.

== Club career ==
Born in Livno, Dujmović started playing in the youth levels of Zrinjski Mostar where he called the attention of Bosnian giant Željezničar, bringing him to the club's youth team in 2017. His impressive performances earned him a year later a move to Turkish side Adana Demirspor, where he played for their youth team in the U21 1. Lig where he made 24 appearances in the 2018–19 season.

In January 2020, Dujmović signed with Mladost Doboj Kakanj in the Bosnian Premier League, but, even before he could make a debut, Serbian side Spartak Subotica showed interest in loaning him, an offer he immediately accepted. He made his debut in 2019–20 Serbian SuperLiga shortly after. In July 2020, he permanently joined Spartak.

In January 2022, Dujmović moved to Radnički Niš. In August 2022, he signed with Romanian club Dinamo București. He was released in January 2024.

On 2 February 2024, Dujmović signed with Željezničar until the remainder of the 2023–24 season. In June 2024, he joined Macedonian First League side Struga on a two-year deal.

== International career ==
Dujmović represented Bosnia and Herzegovina on both the under-17 and under-21 youth levels.
