= David Țone =

Romanian footballer

Personal information
- Full name: David Ioan Țone
- Date of birth: 5 October 2004 (age 22)
- Place of birth: Bucharest, Romania
- Position: Centre back

Youth career
- –2021: Dinamo București

Senior career*
Years	Team	Apps	(Gls)
2021–2022	Dinamo București	5	(0)

International career^{‡}
2021–	Romania U-17	1	(0)
- * Club domestic league appearances and goals as of 29 August 2022 ‡ National team caps and goals as of 9 April 2021

David Ioan Țone (born 5 October 2004) is a Romanian professional footballer who plays as a defender.

== Club career ==
=== Dinamo București ===
He made his Liga I debut for Dinamo București against FC U Craiova 1948 on 26 July 2021, when he replaced Roberto Diniță in the 64th minute, under manager Dario Bonetti. During the 2021-2022 season, he also came in the 74th minute in the away game against CFR Cluj, replacing Răzvan Grădinaru. At the end of the season, Dinamo București was relegated to Liga II for the first time in history.

Țone started the 2022-2023 Liga II season as a first team regular, playing in the first two games of the season, before being relegated on the bench by manager Ovidiu Burcă following the 3-1 defeat against Oțelul Galați and the arrival of more experienced defenders in the team.

== Career statistics ==
=== Club ===
As of match played 29 August 2022

Appearances and goals by club, season and competition
Club	Season	League			National Cup (Note: Includes Cupa României)		Europe		Other (Note: Appearances in Supercupa României)		Total	
Club	Season	Division	Apps	Goals	Apps	Goals	Apps	Goals	Apps	Goals	Apps	Goals
Dinamo București	2021–22	Liga I	2	0	0	0	0	0	0	0	2	0
Dinamo București	2022–23	Liga II	2	0	0	0	0	0	0	0	2	0
Career Total			4	0	0	0	0	0	0	0	4	0
