= Quentin Bena =

French footballer (born 1998)

Personal information
- Date of birth: 11 May 1998 (age 28)
- Place of birth: Poitiers, France
- Height: 1.85 m (6 ft 1 in)
- Positions: Centre-back; defensive midfielder

Team information
- Current team: Saint-Pierroise

Youth career
- –2013: Châtellerault
- 2013–2017: Chamois Niortais

Senior career*
| Years | Team | Apps | (Gls) |
| 2015–2022 | Chamois Niortais B | 63 | (1) |
| 2017–2022 | Chamois Niortais | 41 | (1) |
| 2022–2024 | Dinamo București | 34 | (0) |
| 2024 | Kauno Žalgiris | 7 | (1) |
| 2025 | Botev Vratsa | 14 | (1) |
| 2025–2026 | Châteauroux | 6 | (0) |
| 2025–2026 | Châteauroux B | 2 | (0) |
| 2026– | Saint-Pierroise | | |
- * Club domestic league appearances and goals as of 25 January 2026

Quentin Bena (born 11 May 1998) is a French professional footballer who plays as a centre-back or a defensive midfielder for Réunion Premier League club Saint-Pierroise.

Bena made his senior debut for Niort in April 2017 having signed for the club as a youth player from Châtellerault four years previously.

== Playing career ==
Bena was born in Poitiers and played junior football for Coussay-les-Bois, Saint-Pierre-de-Maillé, Pleumartin and Châtellerault. After Châtellerault won an under-15s tournament in Jaunay-Clan in June 2013, during which he scored a goal and made an assist in the final, Bena joined the youth setup at Chamois Niortais. Over the next four years, he progressed through the ranks at the club, representing Niort at the under-17 and under-19 levels, and playing for the reserve team in the Championnat de France Amateur 2. Originally playing as a forward as a junior, he became a defensive midfielder during his time at Niort.

Towards the end of the 2016–17 season with Niort already assured of a mid-table finish, Bena began to become involved in the first-team squad. He eventually made his Ligue 2 debut on 21 April 2017, coming on as a substitute for the injured Laurent Agouazi in a 1–3 defeat away at AC Ajaccio. He made his first start for the senior team the following week, playing in an unfamiliar left-back position in the 0–3 defeat to Reims at the Stade René Gaillard. He went on to make two further appearances during the remainder of the season, and was rewarded for his breakthrough into the first-team with a three-year professional contract, which he signed on 9 May 2017.

Bena left Niort at the end of the 2021–22 season, having made 48 appearances for the club in all competitions.

In August 2022, he joined Romanian side Dinamo București, playing for the first time in their history in the Liga II. During the 2022-2023 season, he was a squad player, appearing in a total of 17 games, 8 of them in the starting eleven. He played a full 180 minutes in the promotion play-off games against FC Arges Pitesti, which Dinamo won 8-5 on aggregate, promoting back to Liga I after just one season in the lower division. In the first leg of the promotion play-off, Bena scored his first goal for the club, through a header after a corner kick in the 15th minute.

For the 2023-2024 season, he remained with Dinamo București to play in Liga I. After the 1-1 draw at home against Petrolul Ploiești on 26 August 2023, he was selected in the Liga I team of the week. He was released by Dinamo on 2 July 2024.

== Personal life ==
Born in France, Bena is of Congolese descent.

== Career statistics ==
As of matches played 17 August

Appearances and goals by club, season and competition
| Club | Season | League | | | Cup | | Other | | Total | |
| Club | Season | Division | Apps | Goals | Apps | Goals | Apps | Goals | Apps | Goals |
|---|---|---|---|---|---|---|---|---|---|---|
| Chamois Niortais B | 2015–16 | National 3 | 9 | 0 | — | | — | | 9 | 0 |
| Chamois Niortais B | 2016–17 | National 3 | 19 | 1 | — | | — | | 19 | 1 |
| Chamois Niortais B | 2017–18 | National 3 | 14 | 0 | — | | — | | 14 | 0 |
| Chamois Niortais B | 2018–19 | National 3 | 3 | 0 | — | | — | | 3 | 0 |
| Chamois Niortais B | 2019–20 | National 3 | 2 | 0 | — | | — | | 2 | 0 |
| Chamois Niortais B | 2020–21 | National 3 | 2 | 0 | — | | — | | 2 | 0 |
| Chamois Niortais B | 2021–22 | National 3 | 14 | 0 | — | | — | | 14 | 0 |
| Chamois Niortais B | Total | | 63 | 1 | — | | — | | 63 | 1 |
| Chamois Niortais | 2016–17 | Ligue 2 | 4 | 0 | 0 | 0 | 0 | 0 | 4 | 0 |
| Chamois Niortais | 2017–18 | Ligue 2 | 4 | 0 | 0 | 0 | 1 (Note: Appearances in League Cup) | 0 | 5 | 0 |
| Chamois Niortais | 2018–19 | Ligue 2 | 23 | 1 | 2 | 0 | 1 | 0 | 26 | 1 |
| Chamois Niortais | 2019–20 | Ligue 2 | 5 | 0 | 0 | 0 | 3 | 0 | 8 | 0 |
| Chamois Niortais | 2020–21 | Ligue 2 | 5 | 0 | 0 | 0 | — | | 5 | 0 |
| Chamois Niortais | 2021–22 | Ligue 2 | 0 | 0 | — | | — | | 0 | 0 |
| Chamois Niortais | Total | | 41 | 1 | 2 | 0 | 5 | 0 | 48 | 1 |
| Dinamo București | 2022–23 | Liga II | 17 | 0 | 3 | 0 | 2 (Note: Appearances in Liga I promotion play-off) | 1 | 22 | 1 |
| Dinamo București | 2023–24 | Liga I | 17 | 0 | 2 | 0 | — | | 19 | 0 |
| Dinamo București | Total | | 34 | 0 | 5 | 0 | 2 | 1 | 41 | 1 |
| Kauno Žalgiris | 2024 | A Lyga | 1 | 0 | 0 | 0 | — | | 1 | 0 |
| Career total | | | 139 | 2 | 7 | 0 | 7 | 1 | 153 | 3 |
