= Iulian Roșu =

Romanian footballer

Personal information
- Date of birth: 30 May 1994 (age 32)
- Place of birth: Bucharest, Romania
- Height: 1.82 m (6 ft 0 in)
- Position: Midfielder

Team information
- Current team: Chindia Târgoviște
- Number: 23

Youth career
- 2000–2010: Steaua București

Senior career*
Years	Team	Apps	(Gls)
2010–2011	Steaua II București	8	(1)
2011–2014	Steaua București	1	(0)
2013–2014	→ FC Clinceni (loan)	28	(5)
2014–2015	Rapid București	13	(0)
2015–2016	Astra Giurgiu	10	(1)
2016	Berliner AK 07		
2016	ACS Poli Timișoara	7	(0)
2017	Olimpia Satu Mare	11	(2)
2018	Metaloglobus București	14	(1)
2018	Politehnica Iași	0	(0)
2019	Daco-Getica București	0	(0)
2019	Sportul Snagov	16	(3)
2020–2021	Gloria Buzău	25	(2)
2021	FC Brașov	13	(1)
2022	Metaloglobus București	2	(0)
2022–2024	Dinamo București	24	(4)
2024–2024	Concordia Chiajna	15	(0)
2024–	Chindia Târgoviște	42	(8)

International career
2010–2011	Romania U17	9	(2)
2012	Romania U19	3	(0)
2014	Romania U21	2	(0)
- * Club domestic league appearances and goals as of 25 October 2026

Iulian Roșu (born 30 May 1994) is a Romanian professional footballer who plays as a midfielder for Liga II club Chindia Târgoviște.

== Club career ==
=== Steaua București ===
In June 2011, Roșu signed a professional contract with FCSB. Iulian Roșu made his debut for FCSB on 26 November 2011 in a game against Brașov.

== International career ==
Iulian Roșu made his debut for Romania U-17 in a game against Kazakhstan U-17. He played with the under-17 team at the 2011 UEFA European Under-17 Football Championship.

== Honours ==
=== Steaua București ===
- Liga I: 2012–13
- Supercupa României: 2013

=== Astra Giurgiu ===
- Liga I: 2015–16
