= Răzvan Patriche =

Romanian footballer

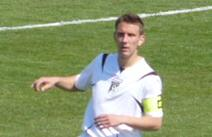

Personal information
- Full name: Răzvan Bogdan Nichita Patriche
- Date of birth: 29 April 1986 (age 40)
- Place of birth: Bucharest, Romania
- Height: 1.83 m (6 ft 0 in)
- Position: Defender

Youth career
- –2004: Sportul Studențesc

Senior career*
Years	Team	Apps	(Gls)
2005−2013	Sportul Studențesc	177	(9)
2013	ASA Târgu Mureș	10	(0)
2014	Universitatea Craiova	9	(0)
2015−2021	Academica Clinceni	140	(7)
2016−2018	→ Afumați (loan)	65	(7)
2022−2025	Dinamo București	85	(4)
Total		486	(27)

International career
2006–2007	Romania U21	3	(1)

Managerial career
- 2025: Dinamo II București (assistant)
- 2026: Dinamo București (assistant)
- * Club domestic league appearances and goals

Răzvan Bogdan Nichita Patriche (born 29 April 1986) is a Romanian former professional footballer who played as a defender.

== Career ==
Patriche played as a youth for Sportul Studenţesc before his debut for the senior team, in 2005, in a Liga I match against FCM Bacău.

== Honours ==
Universitatea Craiova

- Liga II: 2013–14
