= Lamine Ghezali =

French footballer (born 1999)

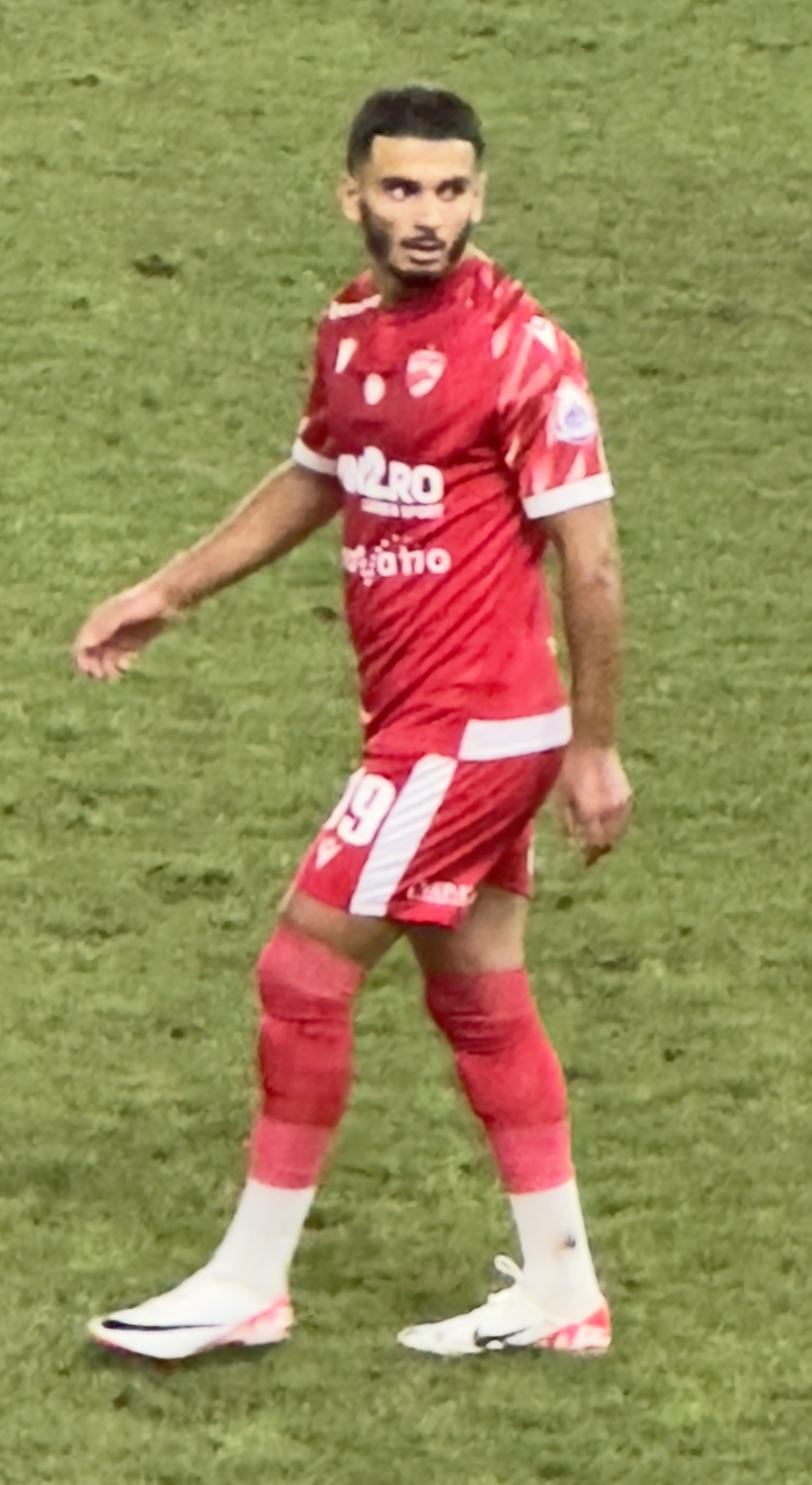
- Ghezali with Dinamo București in 2023

Personal information
- Date of birth: 6 July 1999 (age 27)
- Place of birth: Lagny-sur-Marne, France
- Height: 1.75 m (5 ft 9 in)
- Position: Winger

Team information
- Current team: AC Oulu
- Number: 11

Youth career
- 2006–2014: Torcy
- 2014–2017: Saint-Étienne

Senior career*
Years	Team	Apps	(Gls)
2016–2022	Saint-Étienne B	62	(12)
2017–2022	Saint-Étienne	8	(1)
2019–2020	→ Châteauroux (loan)	9	(0)
2019–2020	→ Châteauroux B (loan)	4	(0)
2020–2021	→ SC Lyon (loan)	14	(0)
2020–2021	→ SC Lyon B (loan)	2	(2)
2022–2024	Dinamo București	41	(9)
2024	Levadiakos	5	(0)
2024–2025	UTA Arad	17	(0)
2025–	AC Oulu	34	(2)

International career
2015	France U17	1	(0)
2017	France U18	2	(0)
- * Club domestic league appearances and goals as of 12 November 2026

Lamine Ghezali (Arabic: غزالي الأمين; born 6 July 1999) is a French professional footballer who plays as a winger for Veikkausliiga club AC Oulu.

== Career ==
Ghezali played youth football up to the age of 15 with Torcy, moving to the training centre of Saint-Étienne in August 2014. He made his Ligue 1 debut on 23 April 2017 against Rennes. Top scorer in the under-19 side, he signed his first professional contract, for three years, on 27 June 2017. He scored his first senior goal with Saint-Étienne in a 5–0 victory at Caen in Ligue 1 on 16 March 2019.

In July 2019, Ghezali was loaned to Ligue 2 side Châteauroux for the 2019–20 season. He was loaned out again in July 2020, this time to Championnat National side SC Lyon. On 15 January 2022, he made his Ligue 1 return for Saint-Étienne in a 2–1 home loss to Lens.

On 17 August 2022, Ghezali joined Romanian side Dinamo București. He was sold in January 2024 to Greek club Levadiakos.

== Personal life ==
Born in France, Ghezali is of Algerian descent and has dual nationality.

== Career statistics ==
As of match played 24 February 2025

Appearances and goals by club, season and competition
Club	Season	League			Cup		Other		Total	
Club	Season	Division	Apps	Goals	Apps	Goals	Apps	Goals	Apps	Goals
Saint-Étienne B	2015–16	CFA 2	7	0	—		—		7	0
Saint-Étienne B	2016–17	CFA 2	9	2	—		—		9	2
Saint-Étienne B	2017–18	National 3	7	3	—		—		7	3
Saint-Étienne B	2018–19	National 2	17	3	—		—		17	3
Saint-Étienne B	2019–20	National 2	3	1	—		—		3	1
Saint-Étienne B	2021–22	National 3	19	3	—		—		16	2
Saint-Étienne B	Total		62	12	—		—		62	12
Saint-Étienne	2016–17	Ligue 1	1	0	0	0	0	0	1	0
Saint-Étienne	2018–19	Ligue 1	6	1	0	0	0	0	6	1
Saint-Étienne	2021–22	Ligue 1	1	0	0	0	—		1	0
Saint-Étienne	Total		8	1	0	0	0	0	8	1
Châteauroux (loan)	2019–20	Ligue 2	9	0	1	0	1 (Note: Appearance in the Coupe de la Ligue)	0	11	0
Châteauroux B (loan)	2019–20	National 3	4	0	—		—		4	0
SC Lyon (loan)	2020–21	National	14	0	0	0	—		14	0
SC Lyon B (loan)	2020–21	National 3	2	2	—		—		2	2
Dinamo București	2022–23	Liga II	24	9	5	1	2 (Note: Appearance in the Liga I promotion play-off)	3	31	13
Dinamo București	2023–24	Liga I	17	0	4	0	—		21	0
Dinamo București	Total		41	9	9	1	2	3	52	13
Levadiakos	2023–24	Super League Greece 2	5	0	—		—		5	0
UTA Arad	2024–25	Liga I	17	0	3	1	—		20	1
AC Oulu	2025	Veikkausliiga	0	0	0	0	0	0	0	0
Career total			162	24	13	2	3	3	174	29

== Honours ==
Levadiakos

- Super League Greece 2: 2023–24
