= Dani Iglesias =

Spanish footballer (born 1995)

Personal information
- Full name: Daniel Iglesias Gago
- Date of birth: 17 July 1995 (age 31)
- Place of birth: Santiago de Compostela, Spain
- Height: 1.73 m (5 ft 8 in)
- Position: Midfielder

Team information
- Current team: Sepsi OSK
- Number: 34

Youth career
- Compostela
- –2010: Ciudad de Santiago
- 2010–2013: Deportivo La Coruña

Senior career*
Years	Team	Apps	(Gls)
2013–2015	Deportivo La Coruña B	79	(25)
2013–2014	Deportivo La Coruña	1	(0)
2015–2019	Alavés B	14	(12)
2015–2016	→ Guadalajara (loan)	33	(7)
2018–2019	→ Istra 1961 (loan)	20	(1)
2019–2021	Rijeka	12	(0)
2021	→ Spartak Trnava (loan)	11	(0)
2021–2022	Sereď	24	(0)
2022–2024	Dinamo București	56	(5)
2024–2025	CSA Steaua București	28	(3)
2025–	Sepsi OSK	22	(1)

International career
2011	Spain U16	3	(4)
2012	Spain U17	2	(0)
- * Club domestic league appearances and goals as of 16 May 2026

Daniel "Dani" Iglesias Gago (born 17 July 1995) is a Spanish professional footballer who plays as a midfielder for Liga I club Sepsi OSK.

== Club career ==
Born in Santiago de Compostela, Galicia, Iglesias was a youth product of local Deportivo de La Coruña. He made his debuts as a senior with the reserves, representing the side in the fourth division.

Iglesias made his official debut for the Galicians' first team on 24 August 2013, playing the last 13 minutes in a 1–0 home defeat against Córdoba CF in the second level championship. On 31 July 2015, he rescinded his contract, with Depor having an option to re-sign him until 2018, and signed a four-year deal with Deportivo Alavés on 11 August.

On 1 September 2015, Iglesias was loaned to CD Guadalajara, in a season-long deal.

Following a loan to Istra 1961 in the 2018–19 season, Iglesias transferred to Rijeka in July 2019.

== Honours ==
Rijeka

- Croatian Cup: 2019–20
