= 2026–27 FC Dinamo București season =

Dinamo București
2026–27 season
- Chairman: Andrei Nicolescu
- Head coach: Nuno Campos
- Stadium: Arena Națională & Arcul de Triumf
- Liga 1: TBD
- Cupa României: TBD
Home colours	Away colours	Third colours

The 2026–27 season is the 78th season of FC Dinamo București and their 4th consecutive season in the top flight of Romanian football, 77 seasons are in the top flight. In addition to the domestic league, Dinamo are also participating in the Cupa României.

== Current squad ==
Updated last, 7 September 2026

No.	Name	Nationality	Position	Date of Birth (Age)	Signed from	Signed in	Contract end (Note: Contract end at 30 June.)
Goalkeepers
1	Devis Epassy	(Cameroon)	GK	2 February 1993 (age 33)	(Cyprus) Karmiotissa FC	9 July 2025	2027
33	Costin Ungureanu	(Romania)	GK	4 April 2008 (age 18)	Academy	11 August 2025	Unknown
36	Alaa Bellaarouch	(Morocco)	GK	1 January 2002 (age 24)	(Portugal) SC Braga	1 July 2026	2027
73	Alexandru Roșca	(Romania)	GK	12 November 2003 (age 23)	1599 Șelimbăr	1 July 2024	2029
Defenders
5	Imran Fetai	(North Macedonia)	CB	2 August 2002 (age 24)	(North Macedonia) KF Shkëndija	31 July 2026	2029
15	Nikita Stoinov	(Israel)	CB	24 August 2005 (age 21)	(Israel) Maccabi Netanya	7 July 2025	2029
19	Răzvan Radu	(Romania)	LB	6 June 2006 (age 20)	Metalul Buzău	1 July 2026	2029
20	David Irimia	(Romania)	RB	12 May 2006 (age 20)	Academy	27 February 2023	2029
22	Darío Benavides	(Spain)	RB	12 January 2003 (age 23)	(Belgium) RAAL La Louvière	18 July 2026	2028
30	Matteo Duțu	(Romania)	CB	23 November 2005 (age 20)	(Italy) AC Milan	23 January 2026	2029
31	Raul Opruț (VC)	(Romania)	LB	4 January 1998 (age 28)	(Belgium) KV Kortrijk	1 July 2024	2029
44	Martín Pascual	(Spain)	CB	4 August 1999 (age 27)	(Spain) CD Mirandés	1 July 2026	2028
66	Ștefan Opriș	(Romania)	RB	6 January 2007 (age 19)	Universitatea Cluj	1 July 2026	2029
Midfielders
6	Matthias Verreth	(Belgium)	DM	20 February 1998 (age 28)	(Italy) SSC Bari	11 August 2026	2029
8	Diogo Pinto	(Portugal)	AM	29 June 1999 (age 27)	(Slovenia) Olimpija Ljubljana	21 August 2026	2027
10	Cătălin Cîrjan (C)	(Romania)	CM	1 December 2002 (age 23)	(England) Arsenal FC	1 July 2024	2029
16	Godwin Udosen	(Nigeria)	CM	3 March 2008 (age 18)	(Nigeria) Blessed Stars Academy	24 August 2024	Unknown
21	Cristian Mihai	(Romania)	DM	23 September 2004 (age 22)	UTA Arad	1 July 2025	2030
90	Andrei Mărginean	(Romania)	CM	3 July 2001 (age 25)	(Italy) Sassuolo Calcio	18 July 2024	2028
Forwards
7	Alexandru Musi	(Romania)	LW	17 July 2004 (age 22)	FCSB	1 July 2025	2029
9	Mamoudou Karamoko	(France)	LW	8 June 1999 (age 27)	(Denmark) FC Copenhagen	7 July 2025	2027
18	Oliver Hintsa	(Eritrea)	ST	1 January 2001 (age 25)	(Norway) Sogndal	1 July 2026	2028
23	Ianis Tarbă	(Romania)	RW	4 July 2006 (age 20)	(Spain) RC Celta de Vigo	16 January 2026	2028
26	Adrian Mazilu	(Romania)	RW	13 September 2005 (age 21)	(England) Brighton & Hove Albion FC	31 August 2025	2029
29	Alberto Soro	(Spain)	RW	9 March 1999 (age 27)	(Spain) Granada CF	7 August 2024	2027
47	George Puşcaş	(Romania)	ST	8 April 1996 (age 30)	Free Agent	24 February 2026	2029
77	Daniel Armstrong	(Scotland)	RW	11 October 1997 (age 29)	(Scotland) Kilmarnock FC	1 July 2025	2027
97	Dean Zandbergen	(Netherlands)	ST	5 September 2001 (age 25)	(Netherlands) VVV-Venlo	1 September 2026	2029
Out on Loan
6	Cristian Licsandru	(Romania)	CM	27 March 2003 (age 23)	Free Agent	15 April 2024	2028
17	Vadym Kyrychenko	(Ukraine)	ST	6 January 2006 (age 20)	UTA Arad	1 July 2025	2029
24	Mihnea Toader	(Romania)	CB	26 July 2006 (age 20)	Academy	1 July 2025	Unknown
98	Alexandru Irimia	(Romania)	CM	12 May 2006 (age 20)	Academy	27 February 2023	2029
-	Denis Oncescu	(Romania)	GK	15 August 2004 (age 22)	Academy	16 April 2021	2028
-	Codruț Sandu	(Romania)	GK	17 April 2006 (age 20)	Rapid București	1 July 2025	2029
-	Peter Maapia	(Nigeria)	AM	6 January 2006 (age 20)	(Nigeria) Academy Ikon Allah	6 September 2024	2028
-	Adriano Manole	(Romania)	CM	28 July 2007 (age 19)	Argeș Pitești	1 July 2026	2029

== Pre-season and friendlies ==
20 June 2026 Friendly	(Poland) Górnik Łęczna	1–2	Dinamo	Kielce
18:00 EEST	? 84'		Musi 39'; Kyrychenko 48'	Stadium: Stadion Korony Kielce

27 June 2026 Friendly	(Poland) Motor Lublin	3–1	Dinamo	Nowiny
18:00 EEST	Duțu 28' (o.g.) ? 66' ? 77'		Pop 25'	Stadium: Sportowy Nowiny

1 July 2026 Friendly	(Poland) ŁKS Łódź II	0–4	Dinamo	Busko-Zdrój
12:00 EEST			Tarbă 16'; Hintsa 36'; Kyrychenko 68'; Musi 81'	Stadium: Miejski

1 July 2026 Friendly	Dinamo	1–2	(Cyprus) AC Omonia	Nowiny
19:30 EEST	Musi 57'		? 30' ? 48'	Stadium: Sportowy Nowiny

11 July 2026 Friendly	Dinamo	1–0	CSL Ștefănești	Balotești
11:00 EEST	Pascual 10'			Stadium: Baza Săftica

11 July 2026 Friendly	Dinamo	1–3	Farul Constanța	București
19:30 EEST	Armstrong 8'		? 28' ? 46' ? 57'	Stadium: Arcul de Triumf

2 October 2026 Friendly	Dinamo	4–0	Metaloglobus București	Balotești
10:30 EEST	Karamoko 39'; Hintsa 75'; Pinto 81'; Mazilu 89'			Stadium: Baza Săftica

== Competitions ==
=== Liga I ===
==== Regular season ====
===== League table =====
Pos	Team	Pld	W	D	L	GF	GA	GD	Pts	Qualification
1	Universitatea Craiova	15	10	3	2	34	10	+24	33	Advances to Play-off
2	Dinamo București	16	10	3	3	32	12	+20	33	Advances to Play-off
3	Rapid București	15	9	4	2	24	14	+10	31	Advances to Play-off
4	Petrolul Ploiești	16	9	3	4	21	18	+3	30	Advances to Play-off
5	Universitatea Cluj	16	9	2	5	29	22	+7	29	Advances to Play-off

Updated to match(es) played on 21 November 2026. Source: LPF (in Romanian)
Rules for classification: 1) Points; 2) Head-to-head points; 3) Head-to-head goal difference; 4) Head-to-head goals scored; 5) Goal difference; 6) Goals scored; 7) Play-off.

==== Results by round ====
Round	1	2	3	4	5	6	7	8	9	10	11	12	13	14	15	16	17	18	19	20	21	22	23	24	25	26	27	28	29	30
Ground	A	H	A	H	A	H	A	H	A	H	A	H	A	H	A	H	A	H	A	H	A	H	A	H	A	H	A	H	A	H
Result	L	W	D	W	W	W	D	W	W	W	W	W	D	W	L	L														
Position	12	5	7	4	2	1	1	1	1	1	1	1	1	1	2															

Updated to match(es) played on 20 July 2026. Source:
A = Away; H = Home; W = Win; D = Draw; L = Loss

=== Matches ===
19 July 2026 1	Petrolul Ploiești	1–0	Dinamo	Ploiești
19:30 UTC+3	Martins 39' (pen.)	Report		Stadium: Ilie Oană; Attendance: 7,710; Referee: George Cătălin Roman

25 July 2026 2	Dinamo	5–1	Universitatea Craiova	Bucharest
20:30 UTC+3	Soro 8'; Musi 29'; Pop 59'; Cîrjan 76' (pen.); Pascual 90+2'	Report	Badelj (red card) 45+6'; Nsimba 50'	Stadium: Arcul de Triumf; Attendance: 7,128; Referee: István Kovács

31 July 2026 3	Oțelul Galați	1–1	Dinamo	Galați
21:30 UTC+3	Fernandes 66'	Report	Soro 42'	Stadium: Oțelul; Attendance: 9,595; Referee: George Găman

8 August 2026 4	Dinamo	4–0	FC Voluntari	Bucharest
21:30 UTC+3	Armstrong 40' (pen.); Musi 73'; Hintsa 90+6'; Mazilu 90+11'	Report		Stadium: Arcul de Triumf; Attendance: 7,348; Referee: Iulian Călin

15 August 2026 5	Rapid București	0–1	Dinamo	Bucharest
21:30 UTC+3		Report	Karamoko 72'	Stadium: Rapid-Giulești; Attendance: 13,154; Referee: Horațiu Feșnic

22 August 2026 6	Dinamo	2–1	Universitatea Cluj	Bucharest
21:30 UTC+3	Armstrong 34', 49'; Musi (red card) 67'	Report	Drammeh 77'	Stadium: Arcul de Triumf; Attendance: 7,567; Referee: Rareș Vidican

29 August 2026 7	Corvinul Hunedoara	1–1	Dinamo	Arad
21:30 UTC+3	Espinosa 15'	Report	Karamoko 52'	Stadium: Francisc von Neuman; Attendance: 6,521; Referee: Andrei Moroiță

5 September 2026 8	Dinamo	2–1	FCSB	Bucharest
20:30 UTC+3	Pascual 36'; Arad 78' (o.g.); Armstrong (penalty missed) 88'; Cîrjan (red card) 90+1'	Report	Duarte (red card) 31'; Miculescu 84'	Stadium: Arcul de Triumf; Attendance: 6,592; Referee: Istvan Kovacs

11 September 2026 9	Csíkszereda Miercurea Ciuc	1–3	Dinamo	Miercurea Ciuc
21:00 UTC+3	Eppel 5'	Report	Armstrong 26'; Zandbergen 37'; Soro 45+1'	Stadium: Municipal; Attendance: 1,518; Referee: George Roman

20 September 2026 10	Dinamo	4–0	Farul Constanța	Bucharest
20:30 UTC+3	Pascual 12'; Mărginean 43'; Cîrjan 54'; Pinto 85'		Alibec (red card) 45+3'	Stadium: Arena Națională; Attendance: 14,779; Referee: Marian Barbu

9 October 2026 11	Sepsi OSK	0–2	Dinamo	Sfântu Gheorghe
21:00 UTC+3			Pascual 24'; Soro 36'	Stadium: Sepsi Arena; Attendance: 6,680; Referee: Viorel Flueran

16 October 2026 12	Dinamo	2–0	FC Botoșani	Bucharest
21:00 UTC+3	Armstrong 81' (pen.); Cîrjan 90+2' (pen.)		Diaw (red card) 90+1'	Stadium: Arena Națională; Attendance: 10,249; Referee: Rareş Vidican

25 October 2026 13	CFR Cluj	2–2	Dinamo	Cluj-Napoca
19:00 UTC+3	Cordea 26'; Ignat 61'		Cîrjan 78'; Zandbergen 81'	Stadium: Dr. Constantin Rădulescu; Attendance: 10,112; Referee: Florin Andrei

1 November 2026 14	Dinamo	2–0	UTA Arad	Bucharest
20:30 UTC+3	Armstrong 44'; Pinto 67'			Stadium: Arena Națională; Attendance: 8,240; Referee: Marcel Bîrsan

6 November 2026 15	Argeș Pitești	2–1	Dinamo	Mioveni
20:30 UTC+3	Sierra 38'; Mendy 90+1'		Sadriu 62' (o.g.)	Stadium: Orășenesc; Attendance: 3,956; Referee: Florin Andrei

21 November 2026 16	Dinamo	0–1	Petrolul Ploiești	Slobozia
20:30 UTC+3			Nlundulu 45+12' (pen.)	Stadium: 1 Mai; Attendance: 4,300; Referee: Gabriel Mihuleac

28 November 2026 17	Universitatea Craiova	–	Dinamo	Craiova
				Stadium: Ion Oblemenco

5 December 2026 18	Dinamo	–	Oțelul Galați	Bucharest
				Stadium: Arena Națională

12 December 2026 19	FC Voluntari	–	Dinamo	Voluntari
				Stadium: Anghel Iordănescu

19 December 2026 20	Dinamo	–	Rapid București	Bucharest
				Stadium: Arena Națională

16 January 2027 21	Universitatea Cluj	–	Dinamo	Cluj-Napoca
				Stadium: Cluj Arena

23 January 2027 22	Dinamo	–	Corvinul Hunedoara	Bucharest
				Stadium: Arena Națională

30 January 2027 23	FCSB	–	Dinamo	Bucharest
				Stadium: Arena Națională

6 February 2027 24	Dinamo	–	Csíkszereda Miercurea Ciuc	Bucharest
				Stadium: Arena Națională

10 February 2027 25	Farul Constanța	–	Dinamo	Ovidiu
				Stadium: Central

13 February 2027 26	Dinamo	–	Sepsi OSK	Bucharest
				Stadium: Arena Națională

20 February 2027 27	FC Botoșani	–	Dinamo	Botoșani
				Stadium: Municipal

27 February 2027 28	Dinamo	–	CFR Cluj	Bucharest
				Stadium: Arena Națională

6 March 2027 29	UTA Arad	–	Dinamo	Arad
				Stadium: Francisc von Neuman

13 March 2027 30	Dinamo	–	Argeș Pitești	Bucharest
				Stadium: Arena Națională

=== Cupa României ===
==== Group stage ====
Pos	Team	Pld	W	D	L	GF	GA	GD	Pts	Qualification	DIN	CRA	VOL	BAC	CHI	LIE
1	Dinamo București	1	1	0	0	4	1	+3	3	Advance to knockout phase	—	—	—	—	28 Oct	—
2	Universitatea Craiova	1	1	0	0	2	1	+1	3	Advance to knockout phase	2 Dec	—	—	—	—	—
3	Voluntari	1	1	0	0	1	0	+1	3		—	28 Oct	—	—	—	—
4	Bacău	1	0	0	1	1	2	−1	0		—	1–2	2 Dec	—	—	—
5	Chindia Târgoviște	1	0	0	1	0	1	−1	0		—	—	0–1	—	—	—
6	Sporting Liești	1	0	0	1	1	4	−3	0		1–4	—	—	28 Oct	2 Dec	—

Updated to match(es) played on 3 September 2026. Source: Flashscore
Legend: Blue = home team win; Yellow = draw; Red = away team win.

2 September 2026 Group stage	Sporting Liești	1–4	Dinamo	Galați
19:00 EEST (UTC+3)	Voinea 86' (pen.)		Musi 4', 19'; Cîrjan 15' (pen.); Hintsa 84'	Stadium: Oțelul; Referee: Mihai Ene

28 October 2026 Group stage	Dinamo	5–2	Chindia Târgoviște	București
19:00 EEST (UTC+3)	Pinto 24', 33', 66'; Zandbergen 84', 90+3'		Mihai 86'; Petre 90'	Stadium: Arena Națională; Referee: Sebastian Lăstun

2 December 2026 Group stage	Universitatea Craiova	–	Dinamo	Craiova
21:00 EEST (UTC+3)				Stadium: Ion Oblemenco

== Statistics ==
=== Appearances and goals ===
Players with no appearances are not included on the list.

As of match played 21 November 2026

No.	Pos	Nat	Player	Total		Liga I		Cupa României	
No.	Pos	Nat	Player	Apps	Goals	Apps	Goals	Apps	Goals
5	DF	(North Macedonia) MKD	Fetai	6	0	2+2	0	2	0
6	MF	(Belgium) BEL	Verreth	11	0	2+7	0	2	0
7	FW	(Romania) ROU	Musi	11	4	7+3	2	1	2
8	MF	(Portugal) POR	Pinto	11	5	3+6	2	1+1	3
9	FW	(France) FRA	Karamoko	13	2	9+4	2	0	0
10	MF	(Romania) ROU	Cîrjan	17	5	15	4	1+1	1
15	DF	(Israel) ISR	Stoinov	15	0	15	0	0	0
18	FW	(Eritrea) ERI	Hintsa	14	2	1+11	1	1+1	1
19	DF	(Romania) ROU	Radu	4	0	0+2	0	1+1	0
20	DF	(Romania) ROU	D. Irimia	15	0	15	0	0	0
21	MF	(Romania) ROU	Mihai	4	0	0+2	0	0+2	0
22	DF	(Spain) ESP	Benavides	10	0	0+9	0	1	0
23	FW	(Romania) ROU	Tarbă	14	0	0+12	0	1+1	0
26	FW	(Romania) ROU	Mazilu	8	1	0+6	1	1+1	0
29	FW	(Spain) ESP	Soro	17	4	16	4	1	0
30	DF	(Romania) ROU	Duțu	5	0	0+3	0	1+1	0
31	DF	(Romania) ROU	Opruț	18	0	16	0	1+1	0
36	GK	(Morocco) MAR	Bellaarouch	16	0	16	0	0	0
44	DF	(Spain) ESP	Pascual	16	4	15	4	1	0
66	DF	(Romania) ROU	Opriș	4	0	0+3	0	1	0
73	GK	(Romania) ROU	Roşca	2	0	0	0	2	0
77	FW	(Scotland) SCO	Armstrong	16	6	16	6	0	0
90	MF	(Romania) ROU	Mărginean	15	1	14	1	1	0
97	FW	(Netherlands) NED	Zandbergen	10	4	8+1	2	1	2
Players sold, released or loaned out during the season:
27	DF	(Democratic Republic of the Congo) COD	Sivis	1	0	1	0	0	0
99	FW	(Romania) ROU	Pop	9	1	5+3	1	1	0

== Transfers ==
=== Transfers in ===
Date	Name	Nationality	Position	From	Fee	Ref.
First team
1 July 2026	Ianis Doană	(Romania)	AM	Steaua București	Free	
1 July 2026	Adriano Manole	(Romania)	CM	Argeș Pitești	Free	
1 July 2026	Răzvan Radu	(Romania)	LB	Metalul Buzău	€60,000	
1 July 2026	Martín Pascual	(Spain)	CB	(Spain) CD Mirandés	Free	
1 July 2026	Ștefan Opriș	(Romania)	RB	Universitatea Cluj	Free	
1 July 2026	Oliver Hintsa	(Eritrea)	ST	(Norway) Sogndal	€200,000	
18 July 2026	Darío Benavides	(Spain)	RB	(Belgium) RAAL La Louvière	Undisclosed	
31 July 2026	Imran Fetai	(North Macedonia)	CB	(North Macedonia) KF Shkëndija	€150,000	
11 August 2026	Matthias Verreth	(Belgium)	DM	(Italy) SSC Bari	€200,000	
21 August 2026	Diogo Pinto	(Portugal)	AM	(Slovenia) Olimpija Ljubljana	Free	
1 September 2026	Dean Zandbergen	(Netherlands)	ST	(Netherlands) VVV-Venlo	€500,000	
Academy (Note: Players born until 31 December 2009)
1 July 2026	Luca Fudulache	(Romania)	CB	Viitorul Onești	Free	
8 July 2026	Tudor Alistar	(Romania)	CB	Ceahlăul Piatra Neamț	Free	
23 July 2026	Andrei Pașcalău	(Romania)	CB	Rapid București	Free	
23 July 2026	Liviu Hrișcă	(Romania)	CM	Rapid București	Free	
27 July 2026	Ianis Dateș	(Romania)	CM	Politehnica Iași	Free	
3 August 2026	Călin Paraschiv	(Romania)		Politehnica Iași	Free	
20 August 2026	Eric Dogaru	(Romania)	ST	Universitatea Craiova	Free	
28 August 2026	Adrian Sârbu	(Romania)	ST	CS Dinamo București	Free	
29 August 2026	Mario David	(Romania)	ST	(Italy) US Sassuolo	Free	

=== Loans in ===
Date from	Name	Nationality	Position	From	Date until	Ref.
First team
1 July 2026	Alaa Bellaarouch	(Morocco)	GK	(Portugal) SC Braga	30 June 2027	

=== Transfers out ===
Date	Name	Nationality	Position	To	Fee	Ref.
First team
30 June 2026	Kennedy Boateng	(Togo)	CB	(Saudi Arabia) Al Fateh SC	End of contract	
30 June 2026	Georgi Milanov	(Bulgaria)	AM	(Bulgaria) Botev Plovdiv	End of contract	
30 June 2026	Jordan Ikoko	(Democratic Republic of the Congo)	RB	Free Agent	End of contract	
30 June 2026	Valentin Țicu	(Romania)	LB	Farul Constanța	End of contract	
30 June 2026	Eddy Gnahoré	(France)	CM	FCSB	End of contract	
1 July 2026	Valentin Dumitrache	(Romania)	ST	Chindia Târgoviște	Free	
1 July 2026	Costin Amzăr	(Romania)	LB	Free Agent	Released	
7 July 2026	Ianis Doană	(Romania)	AM	Politehnica Timișoara	Free	
13 July 2026	Antonio Bordușanu	(Romania)	RW	CSM Slatina	Released	
13 July 2026	Luca Bărbulescu	(Romania)	ST	Free Agent	Released	
13 July 2026	Matei Marin	(Romania)	RB	ASA Târgu Mureș	Free	
24 July 2026	Casian Soare	(Romania)	CM	Free Agent	Released	
24 July 2026	Răzvan Pașcalău	(Romania)	CB	(Italy) Cosenza	Released	
24 July 2026	Raul Rotund	(Romania)	ST	Concordia Chiajna	Released	
24 July 2026	Adrian Caragea	(Romania)	LW	(Greece) PAOK FC	Released	
24 July 2026	Maxime Sivis	(Democratic Republic of the Congo)	RB	(Russia) FC Orenburg	€700,000	
31 July 2026	Ahmed Bala	(Nigeria)	RW	Crișul Sântandrei	Free	
3 August 2026	Hussaini Sanusi	(Nigeria)	RW	Sănătatea Cluj	Free	
7 September 2026	Alexandru Pop	(Romania)	ST	(Israel) Ironi Kiryat Shmona	€150,000	
Academy (Note: Players born until 31 December 2009)
24 July 2026	Andrei Simion	(Romania)	LB	Inter Ilfov	Free	
28 July 2026	Luca Constantin	(Romania)	CM	SC Popești-Leordeni	Free	
29 July 2026	Octavian Dina	(Romania)	ST	Flacăra Moreni	Free	
31 July 2026	Patrick Marcu	(Romania)		CS Dinamo București	Free	
4 August 2026	David Stoican	(Romania)	RB	Dunărea Giurgiu	Free	
4 August 2026	Nicolas Pângă	(Romania)	LW	Progresul Spartac București	Free	
7 August 2026	David Creangă	(Romania)	CM	Oxigen București	Free	
13 August 2026	Luis Neagu	(Romania)		Metaloglobus București	Free	
14 August 2026	Silviu Șorea	(Romania)	ST	Cetatea Turnu Măgurele	Free	
20 August 2026	Ştefan Pintilie	(Romania)	CM	SC Popești-Leordeni	Free	
20 August 2026	Valeriu Scorțanu	(Romania)		Progresul Spartac București	Free	
27 August 2026	Matei Tudor	(Romania)		FC Voluntari	Free	
27 August 2026	David Predescu	(Romania)		FC Voluntari	Free	
27 August 2026	Erik Anghelache	(Romania)		FC Voluntari	Free	
27 August 2026	Andrei Niculae	(Romania)		FC Voluntari	Free	
27 August 2026	Victor Stoica	(Romania)		FC Voluntari	Free	
28 August 2026	Cătălin Iordache	(Romania)		Oxigen București	Free	
31 August 2026	Matei Ion	(Romania)		Metaloglobus București	Free	
3 September 2026	Mario Ciofu	(Romania)		FC Voluntari	Free	
3 September 2026	Vlad Borunceanu	(Romania)		FC Voluntari	Free	
7 September 2026	Darius Sârbu	(Romania)		Concordia Chiajna	Free	

=== Loans out ===
Date from	Name	Nationality	Position	To	Date until	Ref.
First team
3 July 2026	Codruț Sandu	(Romania)	GK	Corvinul Hunedoara	30 June 2027	
13 July 2026	Adriano Manole	(Romania)	CM	CSL Ștefănești	30 June 2027	
21 July 2026	Cristian Licsandru	(Romania)	CM	Concordia Chiajna	30 June 2027	
21 July 2026	Peter Maapia	(Nigeria)	AM	CS Dinamo București	30 June 2027	
30 July 2026	Denis Oncescu	(Romania)	GK	CS Dinamo București	30 June 2027	
8 August 2026	Alexandru Irimia	(Romania)	CM	Metaloglobus București	30 June 2027	
26 August 2026	Vadym Kyrychenko	(Ukraine)	ST	Cetatea Suceava	30 June 2027	
7 September 2026	Mihnea Toader	(Romania)	CB	1599 Șelimbăr	30 June 2027	
Academy (Note: Players born until 31 December 2009)
1 July 2026	Dennis Dicu	(Romania)	ST	CS Blejoi	30 June 2027	
21 July 2026	Bogdan Pitulac	(Romania)	RW	SCM Râmnicu Vâlcea	30 June 2027	
29 July 2026	Rareș Dobîndă	(Romania)	CB	Urban Titu	30 June 2027	
30 July 2026	Andrei Avram	(Romania)	CB	CS Dinamo București	30 June 2027	
7 September 2026	Raul Oprea	(Romania)	CB	Dunărea Călărași	30 June 2027	

=== New contracts ===
Date	No.	Name	Nationality	Pos.	New contract	Ref.
15 September 2026	47	George Puşcaş	(Romania)	ST	30 June 2029	
