= List of Romanian football transfers winter 2025–26 =

This is a list of Romanian football transfers for the 2025–26 winter transfer window. Only transfers featuring SuperLiga are listed.

== SuperLiga ==
Note: Flags indicate national team as has been defined under FIFA eligibility rules. Players may hold more than one non-FIFA nationality.

=== FCSB ===
In:

No.	Pos.	Nation	Player
3	DF	POR	André Duarte (from (Hungary) Újpest)
15	MF	ISR	Ofri Arad (from (Kazakhstan) Kairat)
18	MF	CPV	João Paulo (from Oțelul Galați)

Out:

No.	Pos.	Nation	Player
7	FW	ROU	Denis Alibec (to Farul Constanța)
8	MF	ROU	Adrian Șut (to (United Arab Emirates) Al Ain)
18	MF	MAR	Malcom Edjouma (to (China) Qingdao Hainiu)
20	FW	ROU	Dennis Politic (on loan to Hermannstadt)
—	DF	ROU	Laurențiu Vlăsceanu (on loan to Unirea Slobozia, previously on loan at UTA Arad)
—	DF	GHA	Nana Antwi (to (Israel) Beitar Jerusalem, previously on loan at Hermannstadt)

=== CFR Cluj ===
In:

No.	Pos.	Nation	Player
2	DF	POR	Marian Huja (on loan from (Poland) Pogoń Szczecin)
4	DF	BIH	Ilija Mašić (from (Bosnia and Herzegovina) Zrinjski Mostar)
9	FW	SWE	Alibek Aliev (from (Sweden) Öster)
47	DF	GER	Christopher Braun (from Rapid București)
70	MF	ROU	Denis Crișan (from (Spain) Mallorca U19)
71	GK	ROU	Mihai Popa (from (Italy) Torino)
90	FW	SVN	Luka Zahović (from (Poland) Górnik Zabrze)
—	DF	KOS	Rion Zejnullahu (from (Kosovo) Llapi)
—	FW	MDA	Nicolae Sula (from (Moldova) Zimbru Chișinău U19)

Out:

No.	Pos.	Nation	Player
4	DF	FRA	Kurt Zouma (to (United Arab Emirates) Al Wasl)
5	MF	KOS	Drilon Islami (to (North Macedonia) Shkëndija)
9	FW	ROU	Louis Munteanu (to (United States) D.C. United)
12	GK	ROU	Mihai Pînzariu (to Politehnica Timișoara)
15	FW	GAM	Muhammed Badamosi (to (Latvia) Riga)
18	MF	KOS	Lindon Emërllahu (to (Ukraine) Polissya Zhytomyr)
20	DF	ROU	Alexandru Țîrlea (on loan to Metaloglobus București)
30	MF	BRA	Mateus Peloggia (to (Brazil) URT)
32	FW	ITA	Iacopo Cernigoi (to (Italy) Virtus Verona)
47	DF	CRO	Anton Krešić (on loan to (Albania) Tirana)
89	GK	ROU	Otto Hindrich (to (Poland) Legia Warsaw)
97	DF	GLP	Marcus Coco (to (Israel) Hapoel Tel Aviv)
98	FW	ROU	David Ciubăncan (to UTA Arad)
99	GK	ITA	Alessandro Micai (to (Italy) Reggiana)
—	FW	CIV	Theo Yolou (to Minaur Baia Mare, previously on loan at Ceahlăul Piatra Neamț)

=== Universitatea Craiova ===
In:

No.	Pos.	Nation	Player
22	MF	ROU	Alexandru Iamandache (from Afumați)

Out:

No.	Pos.	Nation	Player
7	FW	CUB	Luis Paradela (loan return to (Costa Rica) Saprissa)

=== Universitatea Cluj ===
In:

No.	Pos.	Nation	Player
4	DF	ROU	Andrei Coubiș (on loan from (Italy) Sampdoria)
29	FW	FRA	Oucasse Mendy (from (Belgium) La Louvière)
33	MF	SRB	Jug Stanojev (from (Kazakhstan) Kairat)

Out:

No.	Pos.	Nation	Player
20	MF	ROU	Alexandru Bota (on loan to Botoșani)
22	FW	NGA	Quadri Taiwo (on loan to CSM Reșița)
33	GK	ROU	Iustin Chirilă (on loan to CSM Reșița)
—	MF	NGA	Raji Ayomide (on loan to CSM Olimpia Satu Mare)
—	FW	ROU	Alin Baciu (to Sănătatea Cluj, previously on loan at Minaur Baia Mare)

=== Rapid București ===
In:

No.	Pos.	Nation	Player
1	GK	MKD	Dejan Iliev (from UTA Arad)
21	DF	ROU	Robert Sălceanu (from Petrolul Ploiești)
30	FW	ROU	Daniel Paraschiv (on loan from (Spain) Oviedo, previously on loan at (Spain) Cultural Leonesa)
33	FW	BRA	Talisson (from (Brazil) Red Bull Bragantino, previously on loan at (Brazil) Avaí)
80	MF	ROU	Olimpiu Moruțan (from (Greece) Aris Thessaloniki)

Out:

No.	Pos.	Nation	Player
1	GK	AUT	Franz Stolz (loan return to (Italy) Genoa)
3	DF	ROU	Robert Bădescu (on loan to Metaloglobus București)
9	FW	SVK	Timotej Jambor (on loan to (Poland) Śląsk Wrocław)
21	DF	ROU	Cristian Ignat (on loan to Petrolul Ploiești)
28	MF	SRB	Luka Gojković (on loan to UTA Arad)
47	DF	GER	Christopher Braun (to CFR Cluj)
55	MF	ROU	Rareș Pop (on loan to Petrolul Ploiești)
90	FW	FRA	Antoine Baroan (on loan to (Portugal) AVS)
99	MF	ROU	Claudiu Micovschi (to Argeș Pitești)

=== Dinamo București ===
In:

No.	Pos.	Nation	Player
23	MF	ROU	Ianis Tarbă (from (Spain) Celta Fortuna)
30	DF	ROU	Matteo Duțu (from (Italy) Milan Futuro)
47	FW	ROU	George Pușcaș (free agent)
55	DF	ROU	Valentin Țicu (from Petrolul Ploiești)

Out:

No.	Pos.	Nation	Player
18	FW	CRO	Stipe Perica (to (Uzbekistan) Neftchi Fergana)
22	MF	ROU	Casian Soare (on loan to CS Dinamo București)
23	MF	CYP	Charalampos Kyriakou (to (Cyprus) AEK Larnaca)
48	FW	ROU	Luca Bărbulescu (on loan to Corvinul Hunedoara)
—	FW	ROU	Raul Rotund (on loan to ASA Târgu Mureș, previously on loan at Unirea Slobozia)

=== Hermannstadt ===
In:

No.	Pos.	Nation	Player
1	GK	ROU	David Lazar (from Argeș Pitești)
2	DF	BUL	Bozhidar Chorbadzhiyski (from (Bulgaria) Botev Vratsa)
15	FW	CMR	Christ Afalna (from Unirea Slobozia)
17	FW	ROU	Dennis Politic (on loan from FCSB)
23	MF	ROU	Eduard Florescu (from Unirea Slobozia)
36	MF	ISR	Aviel Zargari (from (Israel) Beitar Jerusalem)
70	MF	SWE	Moonga Simba (from (Sweden) Sandviken)

Out:

No.	Pos.	Nation	Player
2	DF	LUX	Vahid Selimović (to (Georgia (country)) Iberia 1999)
5	DF	ROU	Florin Bejan (to ASA Târgu Mureș)
17	MF	GER	Patrick Vuc (to 1599 Șelimbăr)
23	MF	ROU	Ianis Mihart (on loan to 1599 Șelimbăr)
25	GK	ROU	Cătălin Căbuz (to Argeș Pitești)
29	MF	ROU	Ciprian Biceanu (to ASA Târgu Mureș)
30	DF	GHA	Nana Antwi (loan return to FCSB)
51	MF	ROU	Alexandru Oroian (on loan to ASA Târgu Mureș)
—	GK	GHA	Obed Ankrah (on loan to Inter Sibiu, previously on loan at 1599 Șelimbăr)
—	MF	GHA	Patrick Ntim (on loan to CIL Blaj, previously on loan at 1599 Șelimbăr)

=== Oțelul Galați ===
In:

No.	Pos.	Nation	Player
80	MF	ANG	Bruno Paz (from (Moldova) Zimbru Chișinău)
96	FW	CRO	Gabriel Debeljuh (free agent)
99	FW	BRA	Luan Campos (from (Turkey) Sivasspor)

Out:

No.	Pos.	Nation	Player
3	DF	COL	Julián Bonilla (to (South Korea) Paju Frontier)
5	DF	ESP	Vadik Murria (to (Spain) Unionistas de Salamanca)
18	MF	CPV	João Paulo (to FCSB)
30	MF	ROU	Matei Frunză (on loan to Cetatea Suceava)
77	FW	POR	Paulinho (to (Poland) Wieczysta Kraków)

=== Petrolul Ploiești ===
In:

No.	Pos.	Nation	Player
2	DF	POR	Diogo Rodrigues (from (Moldova) Zimbru Chișinău)
17	FW	KAZ	Abat Aymbetov (free agent)
22	DF	ROU	Cristian Ignat (on loan from Rapid București)
23	DF	ROU	Andres Dumitrescu (from (Czech Republic) Slavia Prague, previously on loan at (Czech Republic) Sigma Olomouc)
55	MF	ROU	Rareș Pop (on loan from Rapid București)
77	MF	GHA	Nana Boateng (free agent)
—	GK	ROU	Ștefan Georgescu (from Teleajenul Vălenii de Munte)

Out:

No.	Pos.	Nation	Player
5	DF	ROU	Valentin Țicu (to Dinamo București)
10	FW	SUI	Oscar Correia (to (Switzerland) Étoile Carouge)
18	DF	ROU	Robert Sălceanu (to Rapid București)
19	FW	GRE	Konstantinos Doumtsios (on loan to Chindia Târgoviște)
22	DF	ROU	Denis Radu (on loan to (Turkey) Eyüpspor)
25	DF	CMR	Jérôme Onguéné (on loan to (Turkey) Eyüpspor)
26	MF	BEL	Moutir Chajia (to (Lithuania) Sūduva)
27	MF	BRA	Fabrício Baiano (retired)
30	DF	ROU	Cătălin Tolea (on loan to Voluntari)
81	MF	ROU	Miguel Constantinescu (to Chindia Târgoviște)
90	FW	ROU	Iustin Răducan (to CS Dinamo București)

=== UTA Arad ===
In:

No.	Pos.	Nation	Player
14	MF	KOS	Patriot Sejdiu (free agent)
15	MF	NGA	Ime Ndon (from (Moldova) Milsami Orhei)
18	MF	SRB	Luka Gojković (on loan from Rapid București)
96	GK	ROU	Árpád Tordai (from (Lithuania) FK Žalgiris)
98	FW	ROU	David Ciubăncan (from CFR Cluj)
—	GK	ROU	Denis Lungu-Bocean (free agent)

Out:

No.	Pos.	Nation	Player
1	GK	MKD	Dejan Iliev (to Rapid București)
7	FW	HUN	Dániel Zsóri (to (Hungary) MTK Budapest)
19	MF	ROU	Valentin Costache (to (Armenia) Noah)
24	MF	ROU	Alexandru Hodoșan (on loan to Dumbrăvița)
27	FW	ROU	David Barbu (loan return to Universitatea Craiova)
29	DF	ROU	Laurențiu Vlăsceanu (loan return to FCSB)
—	GK	ROU	Denis Lungu-Bocean (on loan to SCM Zalău)
—	DF	ROU	Darius Iurașciuc (on loan to Gloria Bistrița, previously on loan at Corvinul Hunedoara)
—	DF	ROU	Tudor Telcean (on loan to 1599 Șelimbăr, previously on loan at Ceahlăul Piatra Neamț)

=== Farul Constanța ===
In:

No.	Pos.	Nation	Player
2	DF	ROU	Rareș Fotin (from (Spain) Gimnàstic Manresa U19)
7	FW	ROU	Denis Alibec (from FCSB)

Out:

No.	Pos.	Nation	Player
24	MF	MKD	Boban Nikolov (to (North Macedonia) Vardar)
50	MF	POR	André Seruca (on loan to (Malta) Sliema Wanderers)
68	GK	ROU	Răzvan Ducan (to Unirea Alba Iulia)
—	GK	ROU	David Dincă (on loan to CS Dinamo București, previously on loan at CSM Reșița)
—	DF	ROU	Mario Aioanei (on loan to Academica Balș, previously on loan at CSM Olimpia Satu Mare)

=== Botoșani ===
In:

No.	Pos.	Nation	Player
20	MF	ROU	Alexandru Bota (on loan from Universitatea Cluj)
21	MF	BRA	Lucas de Vega (from (Lithuania) Panevėžys)

Out:

No.	Pos.	Nation	Player
77	FW	ROU	Alexandru Cîmpanu (on loan to (China) Chongqing Tonglianglong)

=== Unirea Slobozia ===
In:

No.	Pos.	Nation	Player
7	DF	ROU	Laurențiu Vlăsceanu (on loan from FCSB, previously on loan at UTA Arad)
14	MF	ROU	Nicolae Carnat (on loan from Concordia Chiajna)
15	DF	SUI	Marc Tsoungui (free agent)
19	FW	ISR	Guy Dahan (from (Moldova) Zimbru Chișinău)
20	FW	POR	Cristian Ponde (free agent)
25	MF	ROU	Alexandru Albu (from Chindia Târgoviște)
30	MF	MDA	Teodor Lungu (from (Moldova) Petrocub Hîncești)
77	MF	UKR	Denis Yanakov (free agent)
98	DF	EQG	Esteban Orozco (from Argeș Pitești)

Out:

No.	Pos.	Nation	Player
7	MF	ROU	Eduard Florescu (to Hermannstadt)
13	MF	ROU	Ronaldo Deaconu (to Corvinul Hunedoara)
15	MF	NCL	Jekob Jeno (to (Israel) Hapoel Rishon LeZion)
19	FW	ROU	Raul Rotund (loan return to Dinamo București)
20	DF	ROU	Radu Negru (to (Albania) Bylis)
27	GK	ROU	Ion Gurău (to (Albania) Bylis)
30	MF	ROU	Florin Purece (to Metaloglobus București)
98	FW	CMR	Christ Afalna (to Hermannstadt)

=== Argeș Pitești ===
In:

No.	Pos.	Nation	Player
19	MF	ROU	Claudiu Micovschi (from Rapid București)
34	GK	ROU	Cătălin Căbuz (from Hermannstadt)

Out:

No.	Pos.	Nation	Player
43	DF	EQG	Esteban Orozco (to Unirea Slobozia)
91	GK	ROU	David Lazar (to Hermannstadt)

=== Csíkszereda ===
In:

No.	Pos.	Nation	Player

Out:

No.	Pos.	Nation	Player

=== Metaloglobus București ===
In:

No.	Pos.	Nation	Player
8	MF	ROU	Florin Purece (from Unirea Slobozia)
18	DF	ROU	Alexandru Țîrlea (on loan from CFR Cluj)
99	DF	ROU	Robert Bădescu (on loan from Rapid București)

Out:

No.	Pos.	Nation	Player

== See also ==
- 2025–26 Liga I
