= Raoul Cristea =

Romanian footballer (born 2002)

Personal information
- Full name: Valentin Raoul Cristea
- Date of birth: 4 September 2002 (age 24)
- Place of birth: Bucharest, Romania
- Height: 1.80 m (5 ft 11 in)
- Position: Forward

Team information
- Current team: 1599 Șelimbăr
- Number: 11

Youth career
- Leganés
- –2021: Dinamo București

Senior career*
Years	Team	Apps	(Gls)
2021–2022	Dinamo București	0	(0)
2021–2022	→ Someșul Dej (loan)		
2022–2023	Metaloglobus București	6	(0)
2023–2024	Concordia Chiajna	5	(1)
2023–2024	→ SCM Zalău (loan)		
2024–2025	UTA Arad	20	(0)
2025–2026	Dumbrăvița	25	(2)
2026–	1599 Șelimbăr	11	(1)
- * Club domestic league appearances and goals as of 31 October 2026

Valentin Raoul Cristea (born 4 September 2002) is a Romanian professional footballer who plays as a forward for Liga II club 1599 Șelimbăr.

== Honours ==
SCM Zalău

- Liga III: 2023–24
