= Buza (martial art) =

Russian folkloric fight

Buza (Буза)
- Also known as: Буза Русская
- Hardness: semi-contact, light-contact
- Country of origin: Russia
- Olympic sport: no

Buza (Russian: Буза) is a traditional hand-to-hand Russian folkloric fight. It is expressed as a men's dance battle, combining movements similar to the Tropak and Hopak traditional dances with spinning kicks and sweep kicks, some techniques similar to the Brazilian capoeira. The practice includes the use of traditional Russian costumes, traditional musical accompaniment (optional) and sometimes the use of traditional Russian medieval weapons (such as sticks and knives).

Apparently, there are regular full contact competitions between school fighters from different regions.

== History ==
Buza is a traditional Russian mixed martial art and self-defence system. Its roots lies in the indigenous people of Northwest Russia. Buza is native to the region where the tribes of the Novgorod Slavs, also called Slovens or Illmen Slavs, settled. The ancient martial art developed over centuries in a region where in early 2nd millennium the Novgorodian Rus' was formed. Buza was recreated in the 1990s by Grigorii N. Bazlov from Tver, based on the styles when Buza experienced a renaissance and became very popular in the second half of the 20th century in Tver, Novgorod, Vologda and Pskov Oblasts villages, where the fighters were separated into clans.

== See also ==
- Sambo (martial art)
- Russian martial arts
