= Bogdan Vișa =

Romanian footballer

Personal information
- Full name: Bogdan Valentin Vișa
- Date of birth: 27 May 1986 (age 40)
- Place of birth: Sibiu, Romania
- Height: 1.87 m (6 ft 2 in)
- Position: Defender

Team information
- Current team: 1599 Șelimbăr (assistant)

Youth career
- Inter Sibiu
- –2005: FC Sibiu

Senior career*
Years	Team	Apps	(Gls)
2005–2007	FC Sibiu	7	(0)
2007–2010	CSM Râmnicu Vâlcea	63	(3)
2010–2012	ALRO Slatina	36	(2)
2012–2013	Argeș Pitești	16	(0)
2013–2015	CSMS Iași	16	(1)
2015–2016	Gaz Metan Mediaș	10	(0)
2016–2017	Mioveni	26	(0)
2017–2019	Argeș Pitești	58	(2)
2019–2023	1599 Șelimbăr	41	(3)
Total		273	(11)

Managerial career
- 2023–2024: 1599 Șelimbăr (team manager)
- 2024–: 1599 Șelimbăr (assistant)
- * Club domestic league appearances and goals

Bogdan Valentin Vișa (born 27 May 1986) is a former Romanian professional footballer who played as a defender, currently assistant coach at Liga II club 1599 Șelimbăr.

== Honours ==
CSMS Iași

- Liga II: 2013–14

Viitorul Șelimbăr

- Liga III: 2020–21
