= Florin Maxim =

Romanian football manager and player (born 1981)

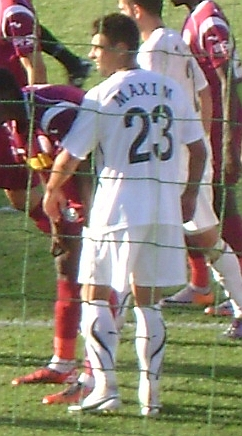

Personal information
- Full name: Florin Sandu Maxim
- Date of birth: 2 March 1981 (age 45)
- Place of birth: Brad, Romania
- Height: 1.78 m (5 ft 10 in)
- Positions: Left back; left midfielder

Team information
- Current team: Corvinul Hunedoara (head coach)

Youth career
- –1997: Aurul Brad

Senior career*
Years	Team	Apps	(Gls)
1997–1998	Aurul Brad		
1998	Corvinul Hunedoara	8	(0)
1999	Steaua București	0	(0)
2000–2001	Unirea Alba Iulia	29	(5)
2001	UM Timișoara	13	(1)
2002–2006	Sportul Studențesc	88	(10)
2006–2008	Farul Constanța	67	(3)
2009–2010	FC Timișoara	14	(1)
2010–2011	Sportul Studențesc	43	(3)
2012	Petrolul Ploiești	9	(0)
2012	Concordia Chiajna	6	(0)
2013–2015	Voluntari	28	(2)
Total		305	(25)

International career
2001–2003	Romania U21	8	(0)

Managerial career
- 2016–2019: Voluntari (youth)
- 2018–2019: Voluntari (assistant)
- 2019–2021: Viitorul Șelimbăr
- 2021–: Corvinul Hunedoara
- * Club domestic league appearances and goals

Florin Sandu Maxim (born 2 March 1981) is a Romanian professional football manager and former player who played as a left-back, currently in charge of Liga I club Corvinul Hunedoara.

== Career ==
=== Steaua București ===
Maxim started to play football in his home-town, Brad, Hunedoara, at CIF Aliman Academy. He also played for Aurul Brad and FC Corvinul Hunedoara. Seen by Victor Pițurcă as an excellent choice for the left-back position, Maxim was approached by Romania's most successful club, FC Steaua București. He was later loaned at Apullum Alba-Iulia.

=== Apullum Alba-Iulia ===
Maxim made an excellent season in Alba-Iulia. He started regularly in the first 11. In 29 games, Maxim scored 5 goals.

=== UM Timișoara ===
Maxim's goals took him in the Liga I, at CSP UM Timișoara. His debut in the first Romanian division took place on 5 August 2001, when UMT lost 0–3 at home against Rapid București.

=== Sportul Studențesc ===
Soon after his debut on Liga I, Maxim signed with Sportul Studențesc. He was prepared, among other, by well-known Romanian coach Ioan Andone. Maxim helped his team finish 4th in the 2005–06 season, before financial difficulties caused the club to be relegated.

=== Farul Constanța ===
Following Sportul's relegation, Maxim joined Farul Constanța.

=== Poli Timișoara ===
In 2009, Maxim signed a three-year contract with FC Politehnica Timișoara. The coach Gavril Balint insisted for his transfer. Maxim scored his first goal for Politehnica in a 4–1 victory against Gloria Buzău.

=== Petrolul Ploiești ===
In April 2012, Maxim signed a short-term deal with Petrolul Ploiești, with an extension clause for another year.

== International career ==
Maxim was called up to the Romania under-21s, where he played 8 times.

== Managerial statistics ==
As of 7 November 2026

Team	From	To	Record							
Team	From	To	G	W	D	L	GF	GA	GD	Win %
(Romania) Viitorul Șelimbăr	8 November 2019	30 June 2021	29	23	5	1	66	20	+46	79.31
(Romania) Corvinul Hunedoara	1 July 2021	present	189	123	33	33	388	173	+215	65.08
Total			218	146	38	34	454	193	+261	66.97

== Honours ==
=== Player ===
Aurul Brad

- Divizia D – Hunedoara County: 1997–98

Steaua București

- Cupa României: 1998–99

Sportul Studențesc

- Divizia B: 2003–04

FC Timișoara

- Cupa României runner-up: 2008–09

Voluntari

- Liga II: 2014–15
- Liga III: 2013–14

=== Coach ===
Viitorul Șelimbăr

- Liga III: 2020–21

Corvinul Hunedoara

- Liga II: 2025–26
- Liga III: 2021–22, 2022–23
- Cupa României: 2023–24
- Supercupa României runner-up: 2024
