= Dinamo Sports Center =

Gymnasium in St. Petersburg, Russia

The Dinamo Sports Center is a gymnasium in St. Petersburg, Russia. The Sports Center has twelve outdoor courts (six clay, six synthetic) and three indoor courts. There's also an indoor pool for the non-summer season (closed June to September) and a football field.

== Events ==
- First held in 1993, the Dinamo Sports Center holds the Mikhail Voronin Cup, a gymnast competition.
- In 2004, Dinamo played host to a demonstration and celebration of Russian martial arts traditions, including Ryabko's Systema.
