= Dragoș Iancu =

Romanian footballer

Personal information
- Full name: Petru Dragoș Iancu
- Date of birth: 29 September 2002 (age 24)
- Place of birth: Huedin, Romania
- Height: 1.87 m (6 ft 2 in)
- Position: Midfielder

Team information
- Current team: 1599 Șelimbăr
- Number: 34

Youth career
- 2010–2020: CFR Cluj
- 2020–2021: Gaz Metan Mediaș

Senior career*
Years	Team	Apps	(Gls)
2021–2022	Gaz Metan Mediaș	23	(1)
2022–2025	Hermannstadt	46	(3)
2025–2026	Politehnica Iași	9	(1)
2026–	1599 Șelimbăr	10	(0)

International career
2022	Romania U20	4	(0)
- * Club domestic league appearances and goals as of 31 October 2026

Dragoș Petru Iancu (born 29 September 2002) is a Romanian professional footballer who plays as a midfielder for Liga II club 1599 Șelimbăr.

== Honours ==
Hermannstadt

- Cupa României runner-up: 2024–25
