= Robert Sălceanu =

Romanian footballer

Personal information
- Full name: Robert Ionuț Sălceanu
- Date of birth: 13 January 2004 (age 22)
- Place of birth: Călărași, Romania
- Height: 1.80 m (5 ft 11 in)
- Position: Left back

Team information
- Current team: Rapid București
- Number: 21

Youth career
- –2020: Dunărea Călărași

Senior career*
Years	Team	Apps	(Gls)
2020–2022	Dunărea Călărași	44	(0)
2022	→ Gloria Buzău (loan)	8	(0)
2022–2025	Gloria Buzău	53	(0)
2025	Farul Constanța	0	(0)
2025–2026	Petrolul Ploiești	14	(1)
2026–	Rapid București	10	(0)

International career^{‡}
2021–2022	Romania U18	8	(0)
2022–2023	Romania U19	2	(0)
2021–2024	Romania U20	3	(0)
2025	Romania U21	1	(0)
- * Club domestic league appearances and goals as of 31 August 2026 ‡ National team caps and goals as of 14 November 2025

Robert Ionuț Sălceanu (born 13 January 2004) is a Romanian professional footballer who plays as a left back for Liga I club Rapid București.

== Career statistics ==
=== Club ===
As of match played 31 August 2026

Appearances and goals by club, season and competition
Club	Season	League			Cupa României		Europe		Other		Total	
Club	Season	Division	Apps	Goals	Apps	Goals	Apps	Goals	Apps	Goals	Apps	Goals
Dunărea Călărași	2020–21	Liga II	29	0	0	0	—		2 (Note: Appearances in Liga I promotion/relegation play-offs)	0	9	0
Dunărea Călărași	2021–22	Liga II	15	0	2	0	—		—		17	0
Dunărea Călărași	Total		44	0	2	0	—		2	0	48	0
FC Buzău (loan)	2021–22	Liga II	8	0	—		—		—		8	0
Gloria Buzău	2022–23	Liga II	23	0	3	0	—		2	0	28	0
Gloria Buzău	2023–24	Liga II	20	0	3	0	—		—		23	0
Gloria Buzău	2024–25	Liga I	10	0	0	0	—		—		10	0
Gloria Buzău	Total		53	0	6	0	—		2	0	61	0
Farul Constanța	2025–26	Liga I	0	0	—		—		—		0	0
Petrolul Ploiești	2025–26	Liga I	14	1	2	0	—		—		16	1
Rapid București	2025–26	Liga I	5	0	0	0	—		—		5	0
Rapid București	2026–27	Liga I	5	0	0	0	—		—		5	0
Rapid București	Total		10	0	0	0	—		—		10	0
Career total			129	1	10	0	—		4	0	143	1
