= Ștefan Opriș =

Romanian footballer (born 2007)

Personal information
- Full name: Ștefan Vasile Opriș
- Date of birth: 6 January 2007 (age 19)
- Place of birth: Huedin, Romania
- Height: 1.75 m (5 ft 9 in)
- Position: Right-back

Team information
- Current team: Dinamo București
- Number: 66

Youth career
- –2015: Actived Huedin
- 2015–2018: Sporting Cluj
- 2018–2025: Universitatea Cluj

Senior career*
Years	Team	Apps	(Gls)
2025–2026	Universitatea Cluj	1	(0)
2025–2026	→ Politehnica Iași (loan)	26	(0)
2026–	Dinamo București	3	(0)

International career^{‡}
2023	Romania U17	1	(0)
- * Club domestic league appearances and goals as of 11 September 2026 ‡ National team caps and goals as of 28 June 2026

Ștefan Vasile Opriș (born 6 January 2007) is a Romanian professional footballer who plays as a right-back for Liga I club Dinamo București.

== Career statistics ==
As of 11 September 2026

Appearances and goals by club, season and competition
Club	Season	League			Cupa României		Europe		Other		Total	
Club	Season	Division	Apps	Goals	Apps	Goals	Apps	Goals	Apps	Goals	Apps	Goals
Universitatea Cluj	2024–25	Liga I	1	0	—		—		—		1	0
Politehnica Iași (loan)	2025–26	Liga II	26	0	0	0	—		—		26	0
Dinamo București	2026–27	Liga I	3	0	1	0	—		—		4	0
Career total			30	0	1	0	—		—		31	0
