= Mihnea Toader =

Romanian footballer

Personal information
- Full name: Mihnea Ștefan Toader
- Date of birth: 26 July 2006 (age 20)
- Place of birth: Bucharest, România
- Height: 2.01 m (6 ft 7 in)
- Position: Centre-back

Team information
- Current team: 1599 Șelimbăr (on loan from Dinamo București)
- Number: 16

Youth career
- –2018: Cautis Steaua Sudului
- 2018–2023: FCSB
- 2024–2025: Dinamo București

Senior career*
Years	Team	Apps	(Gls)
2025–	Dinamo București	1	(0)
2026–	→ 1599 Șelimbăr (loan)	0	(0)
- * Club domestic league appearances and goals as of 31 July 2026 ‡ National team caps and goals as of 31 July 2026

Mihnea Ștefan Toader (born 26 July 2006) is a Romanian professional footballer who plays as a centre-back for Liga II club CSC 1599 Șelimbăr, on loan from Liga I club Dinamo București.

== Club career ==
=== Early career ===
Toader began playing football at the age of seven with Cautis Steaua Sudului and moved to the FCSB academy in 2018. He played as a centre-forward until he was 12, then switched to centre-back. In 2023 he left FCSB for the Dinamo București youth system.

=== Dinamo București ===
Dinamo registered Toader with the Liga Profesionistă de Fotbal in the summer of 2025. In the 2025–26 season he was part of Željko Kopić's first-team squad and a regular for the reserve side, Dinamo București II, in Liga III. In March 2026, a day after a friendly against CS Dinamo București, the club posted a photo of him with the caption "No, it's not Photoshop, it's just our defender Mihnea Toader". At 2.01 m, he was the tallest player in Liga I that season.

He made his Liga I debut at the end of the 2025–26 season, playing eight minutes of a 1–1 draw with Universitatea Cluj in the last round of the championship play-off. He stayed on the bench in the next match, a play-off against FCSB, and did not make the matchday squad in the first eight rounds of the 2026–27 season.

=== 1599 Șelimbăr (loan) ===
On 7 September 2026 Toader joined Șelimbăr on a season-long loan.

== Career statistics ==
As of match played 23 May 2026

Appearances and goals by club, season and competition
Club	Season	League			Cupa României		Europe		Other		Total	
Club	Season	Division	Apps	Goals	Apps	Goals	Apps	Goals	Apps	Goals	Apps	Goals
Dinamo București	2025–26	Liga I	1	0	0	0	—		0	0	1	0
Dinamo București	2026–27	Liga I	0	0	0	0	—		—		0	0
Dinamo București	Total		1	0	0	0	—		0	0	1	0
1599 Șelimbăr (loan)	2026–27	Liga II	0	0	—		—		—		0	0
Career total			1	0	0	0	—		0	0	1	0
