= Imran Fetai =

Macedonian footballer

Personal information
- Date of birth: 2 August 2002 (age 24)
- Place of birth: Gostivar, Macedonia
- Height: 1.88 m (6 ft 2 in)
- Positions: Centre-back; defensive midfielder

Team information
- Current team: Dinamo București
- Number: 5

Youth career
- –2021: Shkëndija
- 2020–2021: → Apolonia (loan)

Senior career*
Years	Team	Apps	(Gls)
2021–2023	Gostivar	24	(1)
2023–2025	Besa Dobërdoll	41	(3)
2023–2024	→ Tikvesh (loan)	27	(0)
2025–2026	Shkëndija	22	(1)
2026–	Dinamo București	4	(0)

International career^{‡}
2019	North Macedonia U18	2	(0)
2020–2021	North Macedonia U19	4	(0)
2021	North Macedonia U20	2	(0)
2022–2021	North Macedonia U21	15	(0)
2026–	North Macedonia	3	(0)
- * Club domestic league appearances and goals as of 25 October 2026 ‡ National team caps and goals as of 1 June 2026

Imran Fetai (Macedonian: Имран Фетаи; Albanian: Imran Fetahi; born 2 August 2002) is a Macedonian professional footballer who plays as a centre-back or a defensive midfielder for Liga I club Dinamo București and the North Macedonia national team.

== Career ==
=== Youth career ===
Fetai played for the youth teams of Shkëndija and Apolonia.

=== Return to Shkëndija ===
He signed for Shkëndija once again on 10 June 2025.

== Career statistics ==
=== Club ===
As of match played 28 October 2026

Appearances and goals by club, season and competition
Club	Season	League			National cup (Note: Includes Macedonian Cup, Cupa României)		Europe		Other		Total	
Club	Season	Division	Apps	Goals	Apps	Goals	Apps	Goals	Apps	Goals	Apps	Goals
Gostivar	2021–22	2. MFL	22	1	0	0	—		—		22	1
Gostivar	2022–23	2. MFL	2	0	1	0	—		—		3	0
Gostivar	Total		24	1	1	0	—		—		25	1
Besa Dobërdoll	2022–23	2. MFL	14	2	—		—		—		14	2
Besa Dobërdoll	2024–25	1. MFL	27	1	1	0	—		1 (Note: Appearances in 1. MFL promotion/relegation play-offs)	0	29	1
Besa Dobërdoll	Total		41	3	1	0	—		1	0	43	3
Tikvesh (loan)	2023–24	1. MFL	27	0	3	0	—		—		30	0
Shkëndija	2025–26	1. MFL	21	1	4	1	16 (Note: Six appearances in UEFA Champions League, two appearances in UEFA Europa League, eight appearances in UEFA Europa League)	0	—		41	2
Shkëndija	2026–27	1. MFL	1	0	—		3 (Note: Appearances in UEFA Conference League)	0	—		4	0
Shkëndija	Total		22	1	4	1	19	0	—		45	2
Dinamo București	2026–27	Liga I	4	0	2	0	—		—		6	0
Career total			118	5	11	1	19	0	1	0	149	6

=== International ===
As of match played 1 June 2026

Appearances and goals by national team and year
National team	Year	Apps	Goals
North Macedonia	2026	3	0
Total		3	0

== Honours ==
Tikvesh

- Macedonian Cup: 2023–24

Shkëndija

- Macedonian Cup runner-up: 2025–26
