= Ianis Mihart =

Romanian footballer (born 2004)

Personal information
- Full name: Ianis Alexandru Mihart
- Date of birth: 23 September 2004 (age 22)
- Place of birth: Ploiești, Romania
- Height: 1.88 m (6 ft 2 in)
- Position: Winger

Team information
- Current team: 1599 Șelimbăr
- Number: 27

Youth career
- 2011–2019: Sport Kids Drobeta Turnu-Severin
- 2019–2021: Universitatea Craiova
- 2021–2022: CFR Cluj

Senior career*
| Years | Team | Apps | (Gls) |
| 2022–2023 | Ripensia Timișoara | 13 | (0) |
| 2023 | Metaloglobus București | 7 | (0) |
| 2023 | Viitorul Târgu Jiu | 0 | (0) |
| 2023–2024 | CSM Focșani | | |
| 2024–2026 | Hermannstadt | 0 | (0) |
| 2026 | → 1599 Șelimbăr (loan) | 5 | (0) |
| 2026– | 1599 Șelimbăr | 9 | (0) |
- * Club domestic league appearances and goals as of 31 October 2026

Ianis Alexandru Mihart (born 23 September 2004) is a Romanian professional footballer who plays as a winger for Liga II club 1599 Șelimbăr.

== Personal life ==
Ianis's father, Cornel, was also footballer.

== Honours ==
Hermannstadt

- Cupa României runner-up: 2024–25
