= Adrian Mazilu =

Romanian footballer (born 2005)

Personal information
- Full name: Adrian Mazilu
- Date of birth: 13 September 2005 (age 21)
- Place of birth: Constanța, Romania
- Height: 1.86 m (6 ft 1 in)
- Position: Winger

Team information
- Current team: Dinamo București
- Number: 26

Youth career
- 2012–2022: Gheorghe Hagi Academy
- 2024–2025: Brighton & Hove Albion

Senior career*
Years	Team	Apps	(Gls)
2022–2024	Farul Constanța	35	(7)
2024–2025	Brighton & Hove Albion	0	(0)
2024	→ Vitesse (loan)	3	(0)
2025–	Dinamo București	19	(1)

International career^{‡}
2019	Romania U15	4	(0)
2020–2021	Romania U16	7	(2)
2021	Romania U17	6	(0)
2022	Romania U18	5	(2)
2023–2024	Romania U19	6	(2)
2022–2026	Romania U21	9	(1)
- * Club domestic league appearances and goals as of 25 October 2026 ‡ National team caps and goals as of 31 March 2026

Adrian Mazilu (born 13 September 2005) is a Romanian professional footballer who plays as a winger for Liga I club Dinamo București.

Mazilu made his professional debut for his boyhood team Farul Constanța in 2022, and aided to a national title in his first season as a senior. At the start of 2024, he joined English club Brighton & Hove Albion for €3 million, which immediately loaned him to Vitesse. In the summer of 2025, he returned to Romania at Dinamo București.

Internationally, Mazilu represented Romania under-21 in the 2023 UEFA European Championship.

== Club career ==
=== Farul Constanța ===
Mazilu made his senior debut for Farul Constanța on 9 November 2022, in a 2–0 Cupa României away win over Rapid București; he came on as a 46th-minute substitute for Luca Andronache and scored an injury-time goal. Three days later, he recorded his Liga I debut in a 1–1 draw at Chindia Târgoviște.

On 6 February 2023, Mazilu netted his first goal in the latter competition by opening the scoring in a 2–1 victory over Universitatea Craiova. On 22 April, he took his league tally to six goals after scoring in a 1–0 defeat of title contenders CFR Cluj. Mazilu amassed 19 Liga I appearances during his first season as a senior, as his club won the national title.

On 12 July 2023, Mazilu played his first European game by starting in a 1–0 home success over Sheriff Tiraspol in the UEFA Champions League first qualifying round. Three days later, Premier League club Brighton & Hove Albion announced that it reached an agreement in advance to sign Mazilu in January 2024, with the transfer fee later confirmed by Farul owner Gheorghe Hagi to be €3 million.

On 28 July 2023, following Farul's elimination from the Champions League, Mazilu scored his first European goal in a 3–2 home win against Urartu in the second qualifying round of the Europa Conference League.

=== Brighton & Hove Albion ===
On 22 January 2024, Brighton & Hove Albion confirmed that the transfer of Mazilu went through and that he subsequently joined Dutch club Vitesse on loan for the remainder of the season. He only made three league appearances without scoring, as the team finished 18th in the Eredivisie and was directly relegated.

In October 2024, Mazilu underwent hip surgery, followed by a second procedure in January 2025, which sidelined for most of the campaign.

=== Dinamo București ===
In late August 2025, reports indicated that Dinamo București was close to transferring Mazilu for a fee between €450,000 and €600,000, with Brighton & Hove Albion retaining a 20% sell-on clause. He was officially unveiled on 31 August, signing a four-year contract with the club.

== International career ==
Mazilu was selected by manager Emil Săndoi in the Romania under-21 squad for the 2023 UEFA European Championship. He came on as a substitute in the opening 0–3 loss to Spain and in the 0–0 draw with Croatia, as his side finished in last place in its group.

== Career statistics ==
As of match played 28 October 2026

Appearances and goals by club, season and competition
Club	Season	League			National cup (Note: Includes Cupa României, KNVB Cup)		Europe		Other		Total	
Club	Season	Division	Apps	Goals	Apps	Goals	Apps	Goals	Apps	Goals	Apps	Goals
Farul Constanța	2022–23	Liga I	19	6	2	1	—		—		21	7
Farul Constanța	2023–24	Liga I	16	1	0	0	8 (Note: Two appearances in UEFA Champions League, six appearances and one goal in UEFA Europa Conference League)	1	1 (Note: Appearance in Supercupa României)	0	25	2
Farul Constanța	Total		35	7	2	1	8	1	1	0	46	9
Vitesse (loan)	2023–24	Eredivisie	3	0	1	0	—		—		4	0
Dinamo București	2025–26	Liga I	13	0	2	0	—		0	0	15	0
Dinamo București	2026–27	Liga I	6	1	2	0	—		—		8	1
Dinamo București	Total		19	1	4	0	—		0	0	23	1
Career total			57	8	7	1	8	1	1	0	73	10

== Honours ==
Farul Constanța

- Liga I: 2022–23
- Supercupa României runner-up: 2023

Individual

- Gazeta Sporturilor Romania Player of the Month: March 2023
