= Adriano Manole =

Romanian footballer (born 2007)

Personal information
- Full name: Adriano George Flavius Manole
- Date of birth: 28 July 2007 (age 19)
- Place of birth: Pitești, Romania
- Height: 1.76 m (5 ft 9 in)
- Position: Midfielder

Team information
- Current team: CSL Ștefănești (on loan from Dinamo București)

Youth career
- –2016: Școala de Fotbal Dănuț Coman
- 2016–2017: ACS Sfinții Împărați Constantin și Elena
- 2017–2018: Viitorul Argeș Alexandru Duminică
- 2018–2026: Argeș Pitești

Senior career*
Years	Team	Apps	(Gls)
2025–2026	Argeș Pitești	8	(0)
2026–	Dinamo București	0	(0)
2026–	→ CSL Ștefănești (loan)	0	(0)
- * Club domestic league appearances and goals as of 2 May 2026

Adriano George Flavius Manole (born 28 July 2007) is a Romanian professional footballer who plays as a midfielder for Liga II club CSL Ștefănești, on loan from Liga I club Dinamo București.

== Career statistics ==
As of 2 May 2026

Appearances and goals by club, season and competition
Club	Season	League			Cupa României		Europe		Other		Total	
Club	Season	Division	Apps	Goals	Apps	Goals	Apps	Goals	Apps	Goals	Apps	Goals
Argeș Pitești	2024–25	Liga II	2	0	—		—		—		2	0
Argeș Pitești	2025–26	Liga I	6	0	1	0	—		—		7	0
Argeș Pitești	Total		8	0	1	0	—		—		9	0
Dinamo București	2026–27	Liga I	0	0	0	0	—		—		0	0
Career total			8	0	1	0	—		—		9	0

== Honours ==
Argeș Pitești

- Liga II: 2024–25
