= Oliver Hintsa =

Swedish-Eritrean footballer (born 2001)

Personal information
- Full name: Oliver Abner Endrias Hintsa
- Date of birth: 1 January 2001 (age 25)
- Place of birth: Halmstad, Sweden
- Height: 1.83 m (6 ft 0 in)
- Position: Forward

Team information
- Current team: Dinamo București
- Number: 18

Youth career
- 2005–2009: Snöstorp Nyhem
- 2010–2020: Halmstad

Senior career*
| Years | Team | Apps | (Gls) |
| 2019–2020 | Halmstad | 0 | (0) |
| 2020 | → Tvååker (loan) | 20 | (8) |
| 2021–2023 | Falkenberg | 83 | (21) |
| 2024–2026 | Sogndal | 69 | (22) |
| 2026– | Dinamo București | 12 | (1) |

International career^{‡}
| 2017 | Sweden U16 | 3 | (0) |
| 2026– | Eritrea | 4 | (0) |
- * Club domestic league appearances and goals as of 1 November 2026 ‡ National team caps and goals as of 16 November 2026

Oliver Abner Endrias Hintsa (Tigrinya: ኦሊቨር ኣብነር እንድርያስ ሕንጻ; born 1 January 2001) is a professional footballer who plays as a forward for Liga I club Dinamo București. Born in Sweden, he represents Eritrea internationally.

== Career ==
Hintsa started playing for Halmstads BK around age 9, rose in the ranks and signed a contract with the first team in 2019. Having not made his league debut yet, he was loaned out to Tvååkers IF in August 2020. He scored several goals there.

In 2021, his prospects to gain more playing time in Halmstad were not good, and he chose to move on to Falkenbergs FF. He scored his first Superettan goal in September 2021.

In January 2024 he was announced as a new player for Sogndal IL in the Norwegian First Division. His goalscoring picked up in his second season, stopping on 14 league goals. A transfer bid from KFUM was reportedly rejected in January 2026. Sogndal reportedly also "put Hintsa in the freezer", declined to let him play if he did not sign an extended contract.

In 2026 he was called up to play for Eritrea, alongside other members of the diaspora. He made his international debut in March in a two-legged face-off agaist Eswatini, where Eritrea won both legs.

== Career statistics ==
=== Club ===
As of match played 1 November 2026

Appearances and goals by club, season, and competition
| Club | Season | League | | | National cup (Note: Includes Svenska Cupen, Norwegian Cup, Cupa României) | | Europe | | Other | | Total | |
| Club | Season | Division | Apps | Goals | Apps | Goals | Apps | Goals | Apps | Goals | Apps | Goals |
|---|---|---|---|---|---|---|---|---|---|---|---|---|
| Halmstad | 2019 | Superettan | 0 | 0 | 0 | 0 | — | | — | | 0 | 0 |
| Halmstad | 2020 | Superettan | 0 | 0 | 0 | 0 | — | | — | | 0 | 0 |
| Halmstad | Total | | 0 | 0 | 0 | 0 | — | | — | | 0 | 0 |
| Tvååker (loan) | 2020 | Ettan | 20 | 8 | — | | — | | — | | 20 | 8 |
| Falkenberg | 2021 | Superettan | 27 | 3 | 3 | 0 | — | | — | | 30 | 3 |
| Falkenberg | 2022 | Ettan | 28 | 8 | 2 | 1 | — | | 2 (Note: Appearances in Superettan promotion/relegation play-offs) | 0 | 32 | 8 |
| Falkenberg | 2023 | Ettan | 28 | 10 | 2 | 1 | — | | 2 | 1 | 32 | 12 |
| Falkenberg | Total | | 83 | 21 | 7 | 2 | — | | 4 | 1 | 94 | 24 |
| Sogndal | 2024 | 1. divisjon | 30 | 4 | 2 | 1 | — | | — | | 32 | 5 |
| Sogndal | 2025 | 1. divisjon | 26 | 14 | 4 | 3 | — | | — | | 30 | 17 |
| Sogndal | 2026 | 1. divisjon | 13 | 4 | — | | — | | — | | 13 | 4 |
| Sogndal | Total | | 69 | 22 | 6 | 4 | — | | — | | 75 | 26 |
| Dinamo București | 2026–27 | Liga I | 12 | 1 | 2 | 1 | — | | — | | 14 | 2 |
| Career total | | | 184 | 52 | 15 | 7 | — | | 4 | 1 | 203 | 60 |

=== International ===
As of match played 16 November 2026.

Appearances and goals by national team and year
| National team | Year | Apps | Goals |
|---|---|---|---|
Eritrea
| Eritrea | 2026 | 4 | 0 |
| Total | | 4 | 0 |

== Personal life ==
Legendary player Freddie Ljungberg is Hintsa's godfather.
