= Răzvan Radu =

Romanian footballer (born 2006)

Personal information
- Full name: Andrei Răzvan Radu
- Date of birth: 6 June 2006 (age 20)
- Place of birth: Bucharest, Romania
- Height: 1.75 m (5 ft 9 in)
- Position: Left-back

Team information
- Current team: Dinamo București
- Number: 19

Youth career
- –2024: FCSB

Senior career*
Years	Team	Apps	(Gls)
2024–2025	FCSB	0	(0)
2024–2025	→ Metalul Buzău (loan)	36	(0)
2025–2026	Metalul Buzău	20	(0)
2026–	Dinamo București	2	(0)

International career^{‡}
2024	Romania U19	2	(0)
- * Club domestic league appearances and goals as of 25 July 2026 ‡ National team caps and goals as of 18 June 2026

Andrei Răzvan Radu (born 6 June 2006) is a Romanian professional footballer who plays as a left-back for Liga I club Dinamo București.

== Career statistics ==
As of 28 October 2026

Appearances and goals by club, season and competition
Club	Season	League			Cupa României		Europe		Other		Total	
Club	Season	Division	Apps	Goals	Apps	Goals	Apps	Goals	Apps	Goals	Apps	Goals
Metalul Buzău (loan)	2023–24	Liga III	12	0	—		—		4 (Note: Appearances in Liga III promotion play-offs)	0	16	0
Metalul Buzău (loan)	2024–25	Liga II	24	0	5	0	—		—		29	0
Metalul Buzău	2025–26	Liga II	20	0	3	0	—		—		23	0
Metalul Buzău	Total		56	0	8	0	—		4	0	68	0
Dinamo București	2026–27	Liga I	2	0	2	0	—		—		4	0
Career total			58	0	10	0	—		4	0	72	0

== Honours ==
Metalul Buzău

- Liga III: 2023–24
