= Nikita Stoinov =

Israeli footballer

Personal information
- Date of birth: 24 August 2005 (age 21)
- Place of birth: Kiryat Motzkin, Israel
- Height: 1.92 m (6 ft 3 1/2 in)
- Position: Centre-back

Team information
- Current team: Dinamo București
- Number: 15

Youth career
- 2014–2018: Maccabi Haifa
- 2018–2020: Neve Yosef
- 2020–2024: Maccabi Netanya

Senior career*
Years	Team	Apps	(Gls)
2024–2025	Maccabi Netanya	20	(1)
2025–	Dinamo București	51	(1)

International career^{‡}
2022	Israel U17	3	(0)
2022	Israel U18	3	(0)
2023–2024	Israel U19	11	(0)
2024–2026	Israel U21	9	(0)
2026–	Israel	8	(0)
- * Club domestic league appearances and goals as of 6 November 2026 ‡ National team caps and goals as of 17 November 2026

Nikita Stoinov (Hebrew: ניקיטה סטוינוב; born 24 August 2005) is an Israeli professional footballer who plays as a centre-back for Liga I club Dinamo București and the Israel national team.

== Career ==
Stoinov was raised in Haifa. He started to play for Maccabi Haifa, F.C. Neve Yosef and in 2020, he signed for Maccabi Netanya. On 23 January 2023, he signed for 3.5 years in the senior team.

On 24 August 2024, Stoinov made his senior debut in the 3–4 loss to Maccabi Bnei Reineh. On 21 October 2024, Stoinov scored his debut career goal in the 2–2 draw against Maccabi Netanya.

== Career statistics ==
=== Club ===
As of 6 November 2026

Appearances and goals by club, season and competition
Club	Season	League			National cup (Note: Includes Cupa României, Israel State Cup)		Europe		Other		Total	
Club	Season	Division	Apps	Goals	Apps	Goals	Apps	Goals	Apps	Goals	Apps	Goals
Maccabi Netanya	2024–25	Israeli Premier League	20	0	1	0	—		3 (Note: Appearances in Toto Cup)	0	24	0
Dinamo București	2025–26	Liga I	37	1	5	0	—		1 (Note: Appearances in Liga I European play-offs)	0	43	1
Dinamo București	2026–27	Liga I	14	0	0	0	—		—		14	0
Dinamo București	Total		51	1	5	0	—		1	0	57	1
Career total			71	1	6	0	—		4	0	81	1

=== International ===
As of match played 14 November 2026

Appearances and goals by national team and year
National team	Year	Apps	Goals
Israel
Israel	2026	7	0
Total		7	0
