= Alexandru Țîrlea =

Romanian professional footballer

Personal information
- Full name: Mircea Alexandru Țîrlea
- Date of birth: 28 March 2000 (age 26)
- Place of birth: Alcalá de Henares, Spain
- Height: 1.82 m (6 ft 0 in)
- Position: Right-back

Team information
- Current team: CFR Cluj
- Number: 20

Youth career
- 2008–2010: Alcalá
- 2010–2019: Real Madrid

Senior career*
Years	Team	Apps	(Gls)
2019–2020	Real Madrid B	0	(0)
2019–2020	→ Salamanca (loan)	16	(0)
2020–2022	Alavés B	41	(1)
2021–2022	Alavés	1	(0)
2022–2025	Gimnàstic	55	(0)
2025–	CFR Cluj	2	(0)
2026	→ Metaloglobus București (loan)	11	(0)

International career^{‡}
2017	Romania U17	1	(0)
2017–2018	Romania U18	5	(0)
2019	Romania U19	2	(1)
2021–2023	Romania U21	5	(0)
- * Club domestic league appearances and goals as of 18 May 2026 ‡ National team caps and goals as of 24 March 2023

Mircea Alexandru Țîrlea (born 28 March 2000) is a Romanian professional footballer who plays as a right-back for Liga I club CFR Cluj.

== Club career ==
=== Early career ===
Born in Alcalá de Henares, Community of Madrid to Romanian parents, Țîrlea joined Real Madrid's La Fábrica in 2010, aged ten, from hometown side RSD Alcalá. On 26 July 2019, after finishing his formation, he was loaned to Segunda División B side Salamanca CF UDS for one year.

Țîrlea made his senior debut on 25 August 2019, coming on as a second-half substitute for Martín Galván in a 3–1 home win over Arenas Club de Getxo. A backup to Javier Carpio, he featured in 16 matches during the campaign as it was curtailed due to the COVID-19 pandemic.

=== Alavés ===
On 27 July 2020, Țîrlea moved to Deportivo Alavés and was assigned to the reserves also in the third division. He scored his first senior goal the following 31 January, netting the B's second goal in a 2–4 home loss against Racing de Santander.

Țîrlea made his first-team debut on 14 December 2021, starting in a 1–2 away loss against Linares Deportivo in the season's Copa del Rey. He made his La Liga debut four days later, replacing Martín Aguirregabiria in a 0–2 away loss against Rayo Vallecano.

=== Gimnàstic ===
On 19 July 2022, Țîrlea signed a one-year deal with Primera Federación side Gimnàstic de Tarragona. On 5 January 2025, he terminated his link with the club.

=== CFR Cluj ===
On 7 January 2025 he joined CFR Cluj.

== Personal life ==
Țîrlea's father, Mircea Nicolae, is a football coach.

== Career statistics ==
As of 18 May 2026

Appearances and goals by club, season and competition
Club	Season	League			National cup (Note: Includes Copa del Rey, Cupa României)		Europe		Other		Total	
Club	Season	Division	Apps	Goals	Apps	Goals	Apps	Goals	Apps	Goals	Apps	Goals
Salamanca	2019–20	Segunda División B	16	0	—		—		—		16	0
Alavés B	2020–21	Segunda División B	23	1	—		—		—		23	1
Alavés B	2021–22	Tercera División RFEF	18	0	—		—		—		18	0
Alavés B	Total		41	1	—		—		—		41	1
Alavés	2021–22	La Liga	1	0	1	0	—		—		2	0
Gimnàstic Tarragona	2022–23	Primera Federación	29	0	1	0	—		1 (Note: Appearance in Primera Federación promotion play-offs)	0	31	0
Gimnàstic Tarragona	2023–24	Primera Federación	19	0	0	0	—		—		19	0
Gimnàstic Tarragona	2024–25	Primera Federación	7	0	2	0	—		—		9	0
Gimnàstic Tarragona	Total		55	0	3	0	—		1	0	59	0
CFR Cluj	2024–25	Liga I	1	0	0	0	—		—		1	0
CFR Cluj	2025–26	Liga I	1	0	0	0	0	0	0	0	1	0
CFR Cluj	2026–27	Liga I	0	0	0	0	0	0	—		0	0
CFR Cluj	Total		2	0	0	0	0	0	0	0	2	0
Metaloglobus București (loan)	2025–26	Liga I	11	0	1	0	—		—		12	0
Career Total			126	1	5	0	0	0	1	0	131	1

== Honours ==
CFR Cluj

- Cupa României: 2024–25
- Supercupa României runner-up: 2025
