= Codruț Sandu =

Romanian footballer (born 2006)

Personal information
- Full name: Codruț Viorel Sandu
- Date of birth: 17 April 2006 (age 20)
- Place of birth: Bucharest, Romania
- Height: 1.91 m (6 ft 3 in)
- Position: Goalkeeper

Team information
- Current team: Corvinul Hunedoara (on loan from Dinamo București)
- Number: 21

Youth career
- 2015–2021: Dinamo București
- 2021–2022: CSA Steaua București
- 2022–2023: Rapid București

Senior career*
Years	Team	Apps	(Gls)
2023–2025	Rapid București	0	(0)
2023–2024	→ LPS Clinceni (loan)	18	(0)
2024–2025	→ FC U Craiova (loan)	23	(0)
2025–	Dinamo București	0	(0)
2025–	→ Corvinul Hunedoara (loan)	42	(0)

International career^{‡}
2021–2022	Romania U16	5	(0)
2022–2023	Romania U17	2	(0)
2024	Romania U18	1	(0)
2024	Romania U19	3	(0)
2025–2026	Romania U20	6	(0)
2026–	Romania U21	1	(0)
- * Club domestic league appearances and goals as of 23 October 2026 ‡ National team caps and goals as of 6 October 2026

Codruț Viorel Sandu (born 17 April 2006) is a Romanian professional footballer who plays as a goalkeeper for Liga I club Corvinul Hunedoara, on loan from Dinamo București.

== Club career ==
=== FC U Craiova ===
He made his senior debut on 6 August 2024 in Liga II match against CSM Reșița.

== Career statistics ==
As of match played 23 October 2026

Appearances and goals by club, season and competition
Club	Season	League			Cupa României		Europe		Other		Total	
Club	Season	Division	Apps	Goals	Apps	Goals	Apps	Goals	Apps	Goals	Apps	Goals
LPS HD Cliceni (loan)	2023–24	Liga III	18	0	0	0	—		—		18	0
FC U Craiova (loan)	2024–25	Liga II	23	0	1	0	—		—		24	0
Corvinul Hunedoara (loan)	2025–26	Liga II	29	0	1	0	—		—		30	0
Corvinul Hunedoara (loan)	2026–27	Liga I	13	0	0	0	—		—		13	0
Corvinul Hunedoara (loan)	Total		42	0	1	0	—		—		43	0
Career total			83	0	2	0	—		—		85	0

== Honours ==
Corvinul Hunedoara

- Liga II: 2025–26
