= Ianis Tarbă =

Romanian footballer (born 2006)

Personal information
- Date of birth: 4 July 2006 (age 20)
- Place of birth: Mollerussa, Spain
- Height: 1.77 m (5 ft 10 in)
- Position: Winger

Team information
- Current team: Dinamo București
- Number: 23

Youth career
- Mollerussa
- –2016: Lleida
- 2016–2017: Gimnàstic Manresa
- 2017–2022: Barcelona
- 2022–2025: Celta Vigo

Senior career*
Years	Team	Apps	(Gls)
2025–2026	Celta Vigo B	5	(0)
2026–	Dinamo București	19	(0)

International career^{‡}
2022	Romania U16	5	(1)
2022–2023	Romania U17	11	(4)
2023–2024	Romania U18	6	(1)
2024–2025	Romania U19	11	(2)
2026–	Romania U20	6	(1)
- * Club domestic league appearances and goals as of 6 November 2026 ‡ National team caps and goals as of 17 November 2026

Ianis Tarbă (born 4 July 2006) is a Romanian professional footballer who plays as a winger for Liga I club Dinamo București.

== Career statistics ==
As of 6 November 2026

Appearances and goals by club, season and competition
Club	Season	League			National cup (Note: Includes Cupa României)		Europe		Other		Total	
Club	Season	Division	Apps	Goals	Apps	Goals	Apps	Goals	Apps	Goals	Apps	Goals
Celta Vigo B	2024–25	Primera Federación	2	0	—		—		—		2	0
Celta Vigo B	2025–26	Primera Federación	3	0	—		—		—		3	0
Celta Vigo B	Total		5	0	—		—		—		5	0
Dinamo București	2025–26	Liga I	8	0	0	0	—		1 (Note: Appearances in Liga I European play-offs)	0	9	0
Dinamo București	2026–27	Liga I	11	0	2	0	—		—		13	0
Dinamo București	Total		19	0	2	0	—		1	0	22	0
Career total			24	0	2	0	—		1	0	27	0
