= CSC 1599 Șelimbăr =

Romanian football club

1599 Șelimbăr
- Full name: Club Sportiv Comunal; 1599 Șelimbăr
- Nickname: Șelimbărenii (The People from Șelimbăr) Călăreții Roșii (The Red Riders)
- Short name: Șelimbăr
- Founded: 2016; 10 years ago as Viitorul Șelimbăr
- Ground: Municipal
- Capacity: 2,450
- Owner: Șelimbăr Commune
- Chairman: Remus Șerban
- Head coach: Ioan Luca (caretaker)
- League: Liga II
- 2025–26: Liga II, 17th of 22
- Website: https://www.csc1599selimbar.ro/
Home colours	Away colours

Club Sportiv Comunal 1599 Șelimbăr, commonly known as 1599 Șelimbăr or simply as Șelimbăr (Romanian pronunciation: [ʃeˈlimbər]), is a Romanian football club based in Șelimbăr, Sibiu County, currently playing in the Liga II.

1599 Șelimbăr was founded in 2016, under the name of Viitorul Șelimbăr in order to continue the football tradition in the commune, after the dissolution of the old team, Sevișul Șelimbăr.

== History ==
CSC 1599 Șelimbăr was founded in 2016, under the name of Viitorul Șelimbăr, by a group of youngsters from the commune, coordinated by Nicolae Preuteasa, in order to continue the football tradition in Șelimbăr after the dissolution of the old team, Sevișul Șelimbăr. The senior squad was enrolled directly in the Liga IV, Sibiu County Series being ranked 6th (2016–17) and 2nd (2017–18), before finishing 1st and to have the chance to play a promotion play-off match.

In the promotion play-off, Șelimbărenii passed of CS Gheorgheni (Harghita County champions), 5–3 on aggregate and promoted for the first time in their history to Liga III, but also at six years after the relegation of Sevișul from this tier.

After two seasons in the third tier, Viitorul Șelimbăr promoted in the Liga II, under the command of Florin Maxim. Viitorul is the first team from Șelimbăr that achieved this performance, in the history of the commune from Sibiu County. In the same summer Viitorul Șelimbăr was renamed as CSC 1599 Șelimbăr.

== Grounds ==
1599 Șelimbăr plays its home matches on Comunal Stadium in Șelimbăr, Sibiu County, with a capacity of 1,000 seats. Starting with the spring of 2019, the club moved on Măgura Stadium in Cisnădie, with a capacity of 2,450 seats (500 in the Main Stand and 1,950 in the Second Stand)., due to the renovation and expansion works that started at their own stadium.

== Honours ==
- Liga III:
  - Winners (1): 2020–21
- Liga IV – Sibiu County:
  - Winners (1): 2018–19
  - Runners-up (1): 2017–18
- Cupa României – Sibiu County:
  - Winners (1): 2017–18
  - Runners-up (1): 2018–19

== Players ==
=== First team squad ===
As of 21 October 2026

Note: Flags indicate national team as defined under FIFA eligibility rules; some limited exceptions apply. Players may hold more than one non-FIFA nationality.

No.	Pos.	Nation	Player
1	DF	ROU	Laurențiu Brănescu
4	DF	POL	Kamil Wiktorski
6	DF	ROU	Ciprian Natea (Captain)
7	MF	ROU	Petrișor Petrescu (Vice-captain)
8	MF	GHA	Emmanuel Ayinie
9	FW	ROU	Cătălin Cocoș
10	MF	ROU	Daniel Benzar
11	FW	ROU	Raoul Cristea
12	GK	ROU	Rareș Măluțan
13	MF	ROU	Cosmin Bucuroiu
14	DF	ROU	Tudor Lanțoș (on loan from CSA Steaua București)
15	MF	ROU	Robert Boboc (3rd captain)
16	DF	ROU	Mihnea Toader (on loan from Dinamo București)
17	MF	ROU	Andrei Șerban

No.	Pos.	Nation	Player
19	FW	ROU	Eneas Horvat (on loan from Universitatea Cluj)
20	DF	ROU	George Monea
21	MF	ROU	Andrei Cătălina
22	MF	ROU	Alexandru Cișmaș
24	DF	ROU	Deniz Giafer
27	MF	ROU	Ianis Mihart
28	DF	ROU	Alexandru Oroian
30	DF	ROU	Tudor Ivan
33	MF	ROU	Alexandru Luca
34	MF	ROU	Dragoș Iancu
42	MF	ROU	Benjamin Kielhorn (on loan from Interstar Sibiu)
77	GK	ROU	Raul Băilă
—	MF	ROU	Ovidiu Buia (on loan from Universitatea Cluj)

=== Out on loan ===
Note: Flags indicate national team as defined under FIFA eligibility rules; some limited exceptions apply. Players may hold more than one non-FIFA nationality.

No.	Pos.	Nation	Player
—	MF	ROU	Yarin Beza (at CIL Blaj until 30 June 2027)
—	MF	ROU	Emanuel Bârză (at Inter Sibiu until 30 June 2027)

No.	Pos.	Nation	Player
—	MF	ROU	Patrick Florea (at Inter Sibiu until 30 June 2027)

== Club officials ==
=== Board of directors ===
Role	Name
Owner	(Romania) Șelimbăr Commune
President	(Romania) Remus Șerban
Vice-president	(Romania) Denisa Dogaru
Delegate	(Romania) Marian Bordean
Sporting director	(Romania) Ioan Luca
Team manager	(Romania) Aurelian Rusu
Head of youth development	(Romania) Alexandru Curtean
Stadium Administrator	(Romania) Ioan Curtean
Secretary	(Romania) Liviu Precup
Press Officer	(Romania) Cătălin Crăciun

=== Current technical staff ===
Role	Name
Head coach	(Romania) Ioan Luca
Assistant coach	(Romania) Bogdan Vișa
Goalkeeping coach	(Romania) George Păun
Fitness coach	(Romania) Tudor Stoian
Video analyst	(Romania) Claudiu Kucsinski
Club Doctor	(Romania) Georgeta Motoc
Kinetotherapist	(Romania) Andrei Bogățan
Masseur	(Romania) Rareș Sabo (Romania) Ovidiu Vaida

== Notable former players ==
The footballers enlisted below have had international cap(s) for their respective countries at junior and/or senior level and/or significant caps for CSC 1599 Șelimbăr.

Romania

- (Romania) Lucian Buzan
- (Romania) Alexandru Ciocâlteu
- (Romania) Adrian Cîrstean
- (Romania) Radu Crișan
- (Romania) Alexandru Curtean
- (Romania) Alexandru Dandea
- (Romania) George Monea
- (Romania) Alexandru Neacșa
- (Romania) Raul Palmeș
- (Romania) Daniel Tătar
- (Romania) Bogdan Vișa
- (Romania) Cosmin Vâtcă

Croatia

- (Croatia) Matko Babić

Moldova

- (Moldova) Ion Cărăruș

Portugal

- (Portugal) Yazalde

Sweden

- (Sweden) Valmir Berisha

== Former managers ==
- (Romania) Florin Maxim (2019–2021)
- (Romania) Eugen Beza (2021–2022)
- (Romania) Claudiu Niculescu (2022–2024)
- (Romania) Constantin Schumacher (2024)
- (Romania) Mihai Ianc
- (Romania) Ioan Luca (2024–2025)
- (Romania) Eugen Beza (2025–2026)

== League history ==
Season	Tier	Division	Place	Cupa României
2026–27	2	Liga II	TBD	Play-off round
2025–26	2	Liga II	17th	Third round
2024–25	2	Liga II	13th	Third round
2023–24	2	Liga II	3rd	Play-off round
2022–23	2	Liga II	13th	Fourth round
2021–22	2	Liga II	14th	Fourth round
2020–21	3	Liga III (Seria VII)	1st (C, P)	Fourth round
2019–20	3	Liga III (Seria V)	3rd	
2018–19	4	Liga IV (SB)	1st (C, P)	
2017–18	4	Liga IV (SB)	2nd	
2016–17	4	Liga IV (SB)	6th	
