= Russian martial arts =

Martial arts styles and schools of Russian origin

There are a number of martial arts styles and schools of Russian origin. Traditional Russian fist fighting has existed since the 1st millennium AD. It was outlawed in the Russian Empire in 1832. However, it has seen a resurgence after the break-up of the Soviet Union.

During the Soviet era, the government wanted to create both military hand-to-hand combat systems and combat sports, resulting in the creation of sambo. During the 1980s and after the fall of Communism the interest in the folk martial arts was reawakened. Through ethnographic study, many new styles based on the folk styles appeared.

== Russian fist fighting ==
Russian fist fighting (Russian - Кулачный бой Kulachniy boy "fist fighting, pugilism) is the traditional bare-knuckle boxing of Russia. The earliest accounts concerning the sport date to the 13th century.

== Sambo ==
Sambo (Russian: са́мбо, IPA: [ˈsambə]; САМозащита Без Оружия) is a Russian martial art and combat sport. The word "SAMBO" is an acronym for SAMozashchita Bez Oruzhiya, which literally translates as "self-defense without weapons". Sambo is relatively modern since its development began in the early 1920s by the Soviet Red Army to improve their hand-to-hand combat abilities. Intended to be a merger of the most effective techniques of other martial arts, sambo has roots in Japanese judo, international styles of wrestling, plus traditional folk styles of wrestling such as: Armenian kokh, Georgian chidaoba, Romanian trântă, Tatar köräş, Uzbek kurash, Mongolian khapsagay and Azerbaijani gulesh.

The pioneers of sambo were Viktor Spiridonov and Vasili Oshchepkov. Oshchepkov died in prison as a result of the political purges of 1937 after accusations of being a Japanese spy. Oshchepkov spent much of his life living in Japan and training in judo under its founder Kano Jigoro. The two Russians independently developed two different styles which eventually cross-pollinated and became what is known as Sambo. Compared to Oshchepkov's judo-based system, then called "Freestyle Wrestling," Spiridonov's style was softer and less strength dependent. This was in large part due to Spiridonov's injuries sustained during World War I.

Anatoly Kharlampiev, a student of Oshchepkov, is often considered the founder of sport sambo. In 1938, it was recognized as an official sport by the USSR All-Union Sports Committee.

== Systema ==
Systema (Система, literally meaning The System) is a Russian martial art. Training includes, but is not limited to: hand-to-hand combat, grappling, knife fighting, and firearms training. Training involves drills and sparring without set kata.

== ARB ==
ARB (Russian: Армейский Рукопашный Бой; Armeyskiy Rukopashniy Boy; 'Army Hand-to-Hand Combat') is a Russian martial art of training for protection and attack receptions that incorporated many functional elements from an arsenal of individual hand-to-hand combat and martial arts from around the world, and has been used in real fighting activities.

== See also ==
- Armored combat (sport), Russia being one of the founders of this martial art along with Ukraine, Belarus, and Poland.
