= FC Dinamo București =

Association football club in Bucharest

Dinamo București
- Full name: SC Dinamo 1948 SA
- Nicknames: Câinii roșii (The Red Dogs); Alb-roșii (The White and Reds); Spartanii (The Spartans); Haita (The Pack)
- Short name: Dinamo
- Founded: 14 May 1948; 78 years ago
- Ground: Arcul de Triumf / Arena Națională
- Capacity: 8,207 / 55,634
- Owners: Red&White Management (87.87%); APCH/DDB Supporters Association (12.06%); ACS FC Dinamo București (0.03%); Dinamo Socios (0.02%); Sorin Preda (0.01%); Andrei Cionca (0.01%)
- Chairman: Andrei Nicolescu
- Head coach: Nuno Campos
- League: Liga I
- 2025–26: Liga I, 4th of 16
- Website: dinamo1948.ro
Home colours	Away colours	Third colours

Dinamo 1948, commonly known as FC Dinamo București (Romanian pronunciation: [diˈnamo bukuˈreʃtʲ]), Dinamo București, or simply Dinamo, is a Romanian professional football club based in Bucharest that competes in the Liga I, the top tier of the Romanian league system.

Founded in 1948 as the team of the Ministry of Internal Affairs, following the merger of Unirea Tricolor and Ciocanul, Dinamo București has played in the Romanian top flight in all but one season of its history. The club has won 18 Liga I titles, 13 Cupa României titles, two Supercupa României titles, and one Cupa Ligii title, making it the second-most successful club in the country.

In the 1983–84 season, Dinamo became the first Romanian club to reach the semi-finals of the European Cup, where they lost 1–3 on aggregate to Liverpool. "The Red Dogs" reached another continental semi-final six years later, in the 1989–90 season, when they advanced to the last four of the European Cup Winners' Cup. Dinamo players won the European Golden Shoe four times between 1975 and 1989: Dudu Georgescu received the award in 1974–75 and 1976–77, followed by Rodion Cămătaru in 1986–87 (later revoked amid scoring controversies), and Dorin Mateuț in 1988–89.

Dinamo's traditional colours are white and red, and the club's home ground is the namesake Stadionul Dinamo, which is currently being rebuilt. During the reconstruction, the team plays its home matches at Arcul de Triumf, although it has also hosted major fixtures at Arena Națională. Its main rival is neighbouring club FCSB, with matches between the two sides known as the Eternal Derby. Dinamo also has notable rivalries with Rapid București and Universitatea Craiova.

== History ==
=== 1948–1955: Foundation and early years ===
Historical chart of FC Dinamo București league performance.

On 14 May 1948, "Unirea Tricolor MAI" — newly entered, in January 1948, under the umbrella of the Communist regime's Internal Affairs Ministry — merged with "Ciocanul București" and formed "Dinamo București", the sporting club representing the above-mentioned institution. The people who contributed at the foundation of the club were the Minister of Internal Affairs, Teohari Georgescu and the Jewish brothers Alexandru and Turi Vogl.

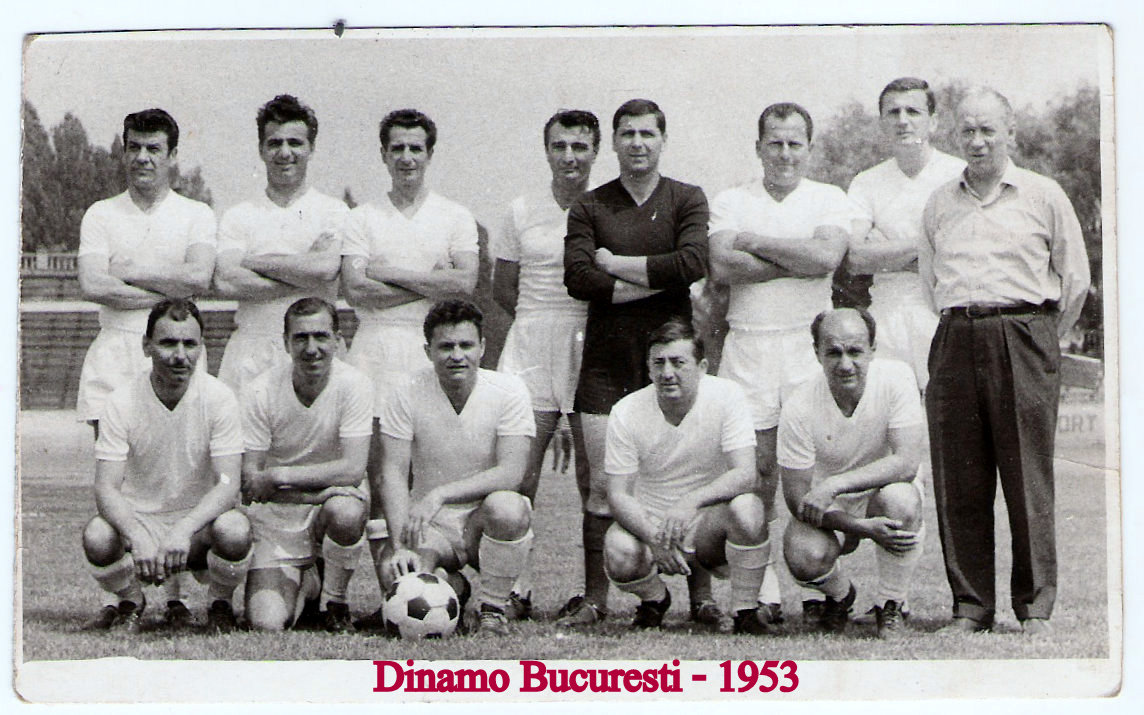
The Dinamo squad in 1953

Until the end of the championship, Dinamo was going to be represented by two teams: "Ciocanul" ("Hammer"), named "Dinamo A" and "Unirea Tricolor MAI", known as "Dinamo B" (this last one relegating, at the end of the football season, into the Divizia B). Starting with 1950, Dinamo A was separated from Dinamo B, the latter being transferred first to Braşov, then to Cluj-Napoca, and eventually, in 1958, being moved to Bacău, where it became FCM Bacău.

The "Dinamo" name was used for the first time on 1 May 1948. Nevertheless, the real debut of Dinamo was on the 1947–48 Divizia A edition (finishing 8th). Some of the team's players were Ambru, Angelo Niculescu, Teodorescu, Șiclovan, Bartha and Sârbu.

On 11 July 1948, Dinamo played its first international match against SK Židenice from Czechoslovakia, and winning 4–1. 22 August will remain a reference date for Dinamo's football, representing the debut of Dinamo Bucharest in the first national Division. The pioneers were, among others, Titus Ozon, Lăzăreanu, Farkaș. The team's first coach was Coloman Braun-Bogdan. A year later Nicolae Dumitru and Gheorghe Băcuț join the club. At the end of the 1950 Divizia A edition, Angelo Niculescu retires, dedicating himself to the coaching profession.

In 1955, Dinamo won their first championship with Angelo Niculescu as head coach, Dinamo impressed mainly in the offensive, with an attack formed by Ene I, Neagu and Suru. The defense, with players like Băcuț I (Gheorghe), Băcuț II (Ladislau), Szökő, Călinoiu, was the best in the championship – only 19 goals received.

In the fall of 1956, the team makes its debut in the European Cup (competition created a year before). Dinamo was the first Romanian club to play in the competition. The debut game was played on 26 August 1956, in front of 32,000 spectators. Dinamo defeated Galatasaray with 3–1. In the second leg, Dinamo lost in Istanbul with 1–2, and moved forward.

=== 1950–1981: Domestic success and European competition ===
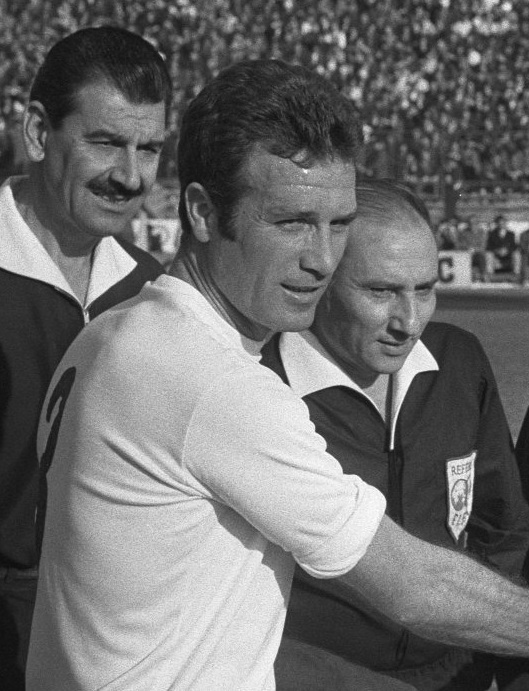
Ion Nunweiller, one of the club legends.

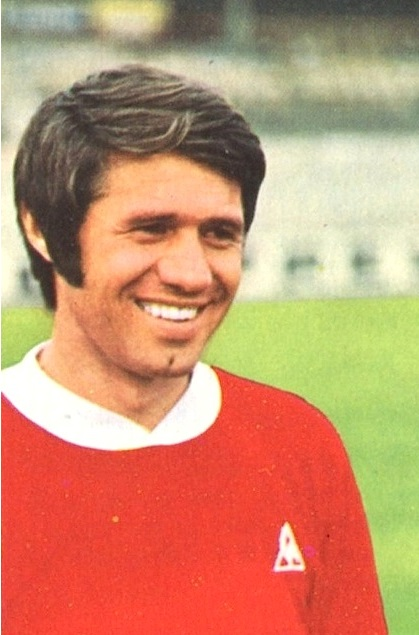
Ion Pârcălab, a key member of the great Dinamo team of the 1960s

Dinamo won the second championship in 1962, with players like Datcu, I. Nunweiller, Pârcălab, Frățilă, Popa, Varga (head coaches were Traian Ionescu, Constantin Teașcă and Nicușor Dumitru). In 1963, the club won their third title. Midfielder Vasile Gergely joined the team that season.

In the 1963–64 season, the club won the double with new players such as Octavian Popescu and Emil Petru. In the Romanian Cup final they beat rivals Steaua 5–3. Dinamo played in the 1963–64 European Cup against the famous Real Madrid (1–3 in Bucharest), a team with Di Stefano and Gento. The game played in Bucharest took place at "23 August" Stadium, and established a new record for this arena: 100,000 spectators.

In the fall of 1964, in the European Cup, Dinamo met Inter Milan with Facchetti, Mazzola, Jair, Corso and Suárez. Dinamo lost both legs, 0–6 and 0–1.

In 1965, Dinamo won their fourth consecutive title, with players like Mircea Lucescu, Radu Nunweiller and Gheorghe Ene. The following season of the European Cup, Dinamo met again Inter Milan, and managed to win the home game, 2–1. Inter won at San Siro 2–0 and moved forward.

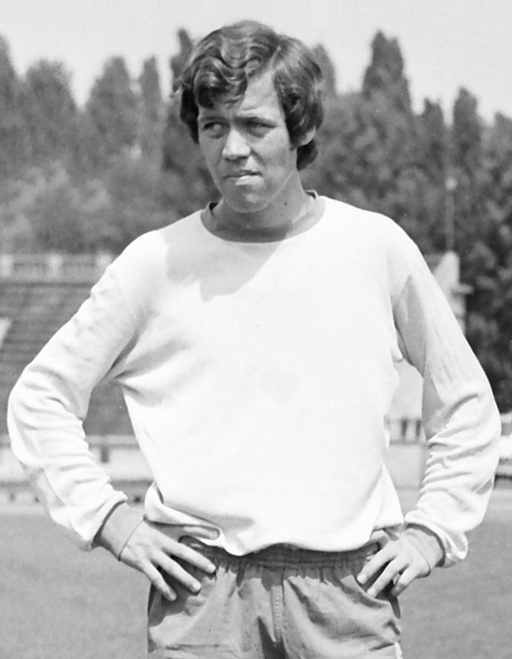
Florea Dumitrache

The club won their 6th title in 1971. In the 1971–72 European Cup campaign, Dinamo eliminated Spartak Trnava, the team of Dobias, Kuna and Adamec, and losing in the second round to Ernst Happel's Feyenoord 0–3 and 0–2. The 7th title comes two years later, in 1973, when Dinamo won a game against CFR Cluj at the exact margins to pass Universitatea Craiova in the standings. In the 1973–74 European Cup, they surpass Northern Ireland's Crusaders Belfast (The 11–0 home game against Northern Ireland's team is still the biggest margin of victory in the history of the European Cup), but fail against Atlético Madrid (0–2 and 2–2), the team of Gárate, Irueta, Heredia and Ayala. The next year Dinamo plays in the 1974–75 UEFA Cup and after eliminating Boluspor, they lose to F.C. Koln: 1–1 and 2–3.

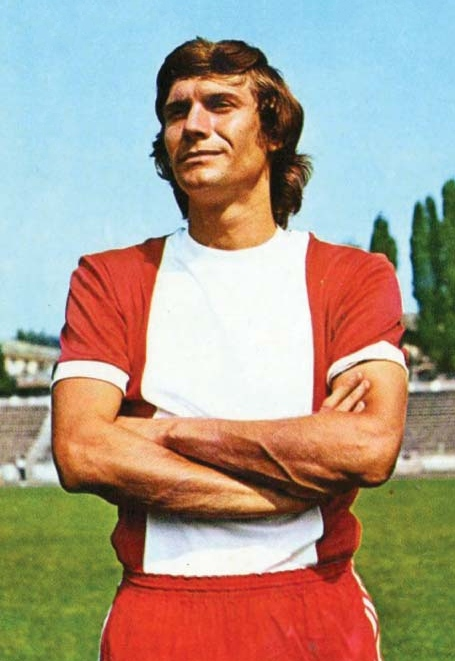
Dudu Georgescu, the club's all-time topscorer with 207 goals

The Red Dogs won their 8th title in the 1974–75 season, Dudu Georgescu received his first 'Golden Boot' award after scoring 33 goals that year. The title winning squad included young and experienced players like Sătmăreanu, Moldovan, Vrînceanu, Marin and Deleanu. In the 1976–77 UEFA Cup, Dinamo played against AC Milan with Fabio Capello and Collovatti on its side: 0–0 and 1–2.

The 1976–77 season brings the 9th title for the club, and the second 'Golden Boot' for Georgescu (47 goals). In the autumn of 1977 in the European Cup, Dinamo wins a thrilling game against Atlético Madrid 2–1, but loses at Madrid, 2–0.

In the second round of the 1979–80 UEFA Cup (after eliminating Alki Larnaca from Cyprus) Dinamo is eliminated by Eintracht Frankfurt, team of Grabowski and Hölzenbein (2–0 and 0–3 in prolongation). The German side ended up winning the trophy.

=== 1981–1992: Golden team ===
The 1981–82 UEFA Cup season brings some great wins for Dinamo. The red-whites meet Levski Sofia of Bulgaria (3–0 and 1–2). In the second round, a terrifying "double": Dinamo-Internazionale (with Bergomi, Bagni, Prohaska, Altobelli, Baresi, Oriali, Marini and Beccalossi). At Milan, 1–1 (authors: Pasinato and Custov) and back home in Bucharest, 3–2 for the "dogs", in the extra time. Dinamo is eliminated by the Swedish team IFK Göteborg, which later ends up winning the trophy.

The 10th national title will be obtained in 1982, when Dinamo also conquers the Cup after a 3–2 victory against Baia Mare. After a 5-year absence, Dinamo reappears in the European Cup, meeting (and eliminating) Vaaleregen Oslo. In the next stage, Dinamo faced the team of Dukla Prague which included players such as Nehoda and Vízek. They win at home, with 2–0, obtaining the qualification at Prague: 1–2. Dinamo is eliminated by Aston Villa, club of Cowans, Withe, Shaw and Morley. In 1983, the club win their 11th title.

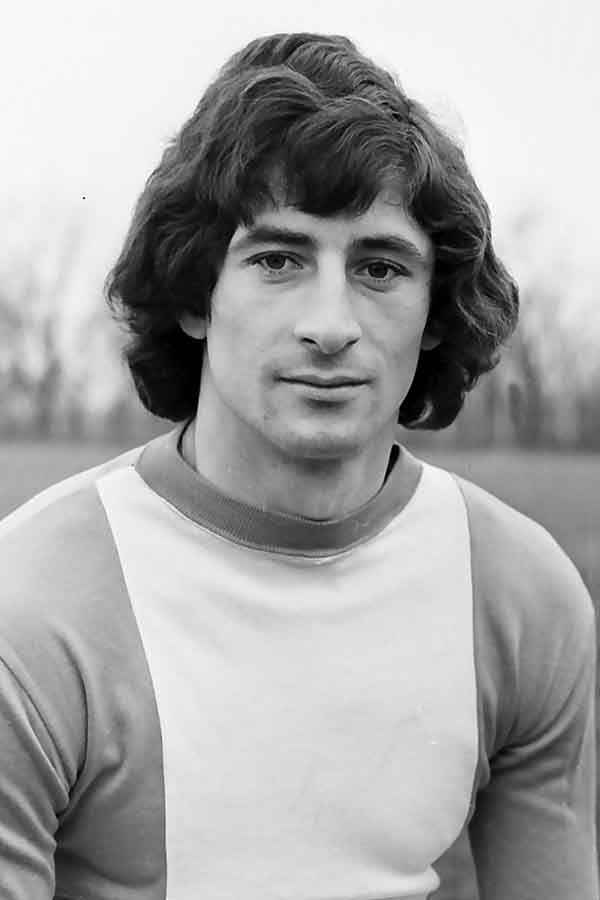
Cornel Dinu, the player with the most appearances for Dinamo (454)

The 1983–1984 season began with the retirement of Cornel Dinu, winner of 6 national titles and 6 national cups, with 454 appearances in the first league and 75 in the national team. Still the same year Dinamo wins their 12th title. The autumn of 1983–84 was going to represent a valuable step into the international arena. The European Cup campaign started with the Finnish team, Kuusysi Lahti (1–0 and 3–0). The second round pushes Dinamo against the current champion, Hamburger SV – team of Kaltz and Magath. At Bucharest, Augustin, Mulțescu and Orac score for 3–0. The thrilling second leg finishes 3–2 (goals Țălnar and Mulțescu). In order to accede in the semifinals of the European Cup, Dinamo had to defeat the Soviet side Dinamo Minsk, with Aleinikov, Zygmantovich and Hurynovich. The first leg was 1–1 (Rednic equalizing in the 87th minute), and it was followed by a 1–0 victory at Bucharest (with Augustin scoring). Dinamo was the first Romanian team to reach the European Cup semi-finals, where it met Liverpool. Dinamo lost 1–0 at Anfield in the first leg match where Graeme Souness had punched captain Lica Movila which had set up a tough match back in Romania. In the second-leg Dinamo lost 2–1 to Liverpool who went on to win the competition. In the first round of the next European Cup, in the autumn of 1984, Dinamo meets Omonia Nicosia: 4–1 and 1–2. Next is the match against Girondins Bordeaux (club of Tigana, Giresse, Lacombe and Battiston), Dinamo being eliminated after 0–1 and 1–1. In 1986, Dinamo won the Cup against Steaua (1–0). After an 18-year break, Dinamo played again in the Cup Winners Cup in the autumn of 1986. The 1986–87 season brought the 'Golden Boot' for Cămătaru (44 goals). The 1988 Romanian cup final was a special one. After Steaua players left the field at the score of 1–1 due to a claim of being robbed by the referee, Dinamo was given the trophy, but later the Romanian F.A. (bowing to pressure from the Communist Party) awarded the match 2–1 to Steaua. After the revolution of December 1989, Steaua propositioned to return the trophy to Dinamo, which refused to take it. In the 1988–89 Cup Winners Cup season, Dinamo again eliminated the Finnish team Lahti, managing to win 3–0. Next is the elimination of

1989–90 European Cup Winners' Cup Semi-final team

Scottish club Dundee United: 1–0 and 1–1 at Bucharest. However, they fail to qualify for the semifinals after losing on away goals, 1–1 and 0–0 against Sampdoria Genova.

The Cup Winners Cup 1989–90 season brings new success. Dinamo meets Albanian team, Dinamo Tirana 0–1 and 2–0. Next is the Greek champion, Panathinaikos 2–0 and 6–1. In the quarter-finals they meet Partizan Belgrade (with Mijatović on the field) eliminating them with 2–1 and 2–0. After six years of break, Dinamo plays a new continental semifinal this time against Anderlecht Bruxelles, losing twice with 1–0. In the summer of 1990, Dinamo – with Mircea Lucescu as coach – conquers a new national title, the 13th. Also the team wins the Cup final, against Steaua: 6–4. The new 1990–91 European Cup season begins with the elimination of Irish club St Patrick's Athletic of Dublin (4–0 and 1–1). Dinamo is eliminated in the second round by FC Porto. In the 1991–92 UEFA Cup edition, the club faces Luís Figo's Sporting Clube de Portugal, qualifying after a 0–1 loss and a 2–0 victory. The next round Dinamo is eliminated by Italian side Genoa: 1–3 and 2–2. In 1992, the 14th title was added to Dinamo's record. It was a triumphal march, with 34 matches and no defeat.

=== 1992–2013: Ups and downs following privatisation ===
The years to come saw Dinamo in the UEFA Cup. However, without any special results, the team leaves the competition in the first qualification round, in 1993–1994 losing to Cagliari, in 1994–95 losing to Trabzonspor, and in 1996 losing to Levski Sofia. Among the new players that play for Dinamo are: Catalin Hildan, Florentin Petre, Cosmin Contra. Alongside the goalkeeper Florin Prunea appear Mihalcea and Kiriță. With this new team, in the 1998–1999 season Dinamo plays arguably the best football in Romania, though the team loses the title to Rapid București. Dinamo ended the dark era of the mid-1990s this way once they started to fight for the title this year, only having to wait one more year to win it with no contender. Dinamo played next season in the UEFA Cup beating Benfica 1–0 on Estádio da Luz, then losing a suspected game on Lia Manoliu 2–0. Dinamo won the title in the 1999–2000 with Adrian Mutu playing for them but lost to Polonia Warszawa in the second qualification round of the UEFA Champions League 1999–00 mostly because they sold most of the players in the Summer Mercato. This affected their next season, when they lost the title to Steaua Bucharest. In 2001–02 Dinamo won the title again after a tight championship run. Dinamo managed to win the title in the last game of the season just in front of FC National. In Europe, Dinamo played in the 2001–02 UEFA Cup eliminating Dinamo Tirana in the Qualifying round but lost in the 1st round to Grasshopper Club Zurich. In the 2002–03 season Dinamo was affected again by the players who left the team, with it becoming a tradition for the leaders of the club to sell players after winning a title, losing the games in the UEFA Champions League and having a hard time in Divizia A. Dinamo changed a lot of managers and lost 7 consecutive games. After Ioan Andone came to the team, Dinamo played a spectacular semifinal with Astra Ploiesti. After losing 2–1 in Ploiesti in the middle of the crisis the team beat Astra in Bucharest 3–1 after extra time. They then went on to win the Romanian Cup, after beating FC National in the final 1–0 on a goal scored by Iulian Tames.

After building up a team again in 2003–04, they eliminated Shakhtar Donetsk in the first round of the UEFA Cup 2003–04 season. They went on to lose to Spartak Moscow in the second round. In the Romanian League Dinamo won the title by defeating FCSB in a close battle. They also won the Romanian Cup after a 2–0 win over Oţelul Galaţi at Cotroceni.

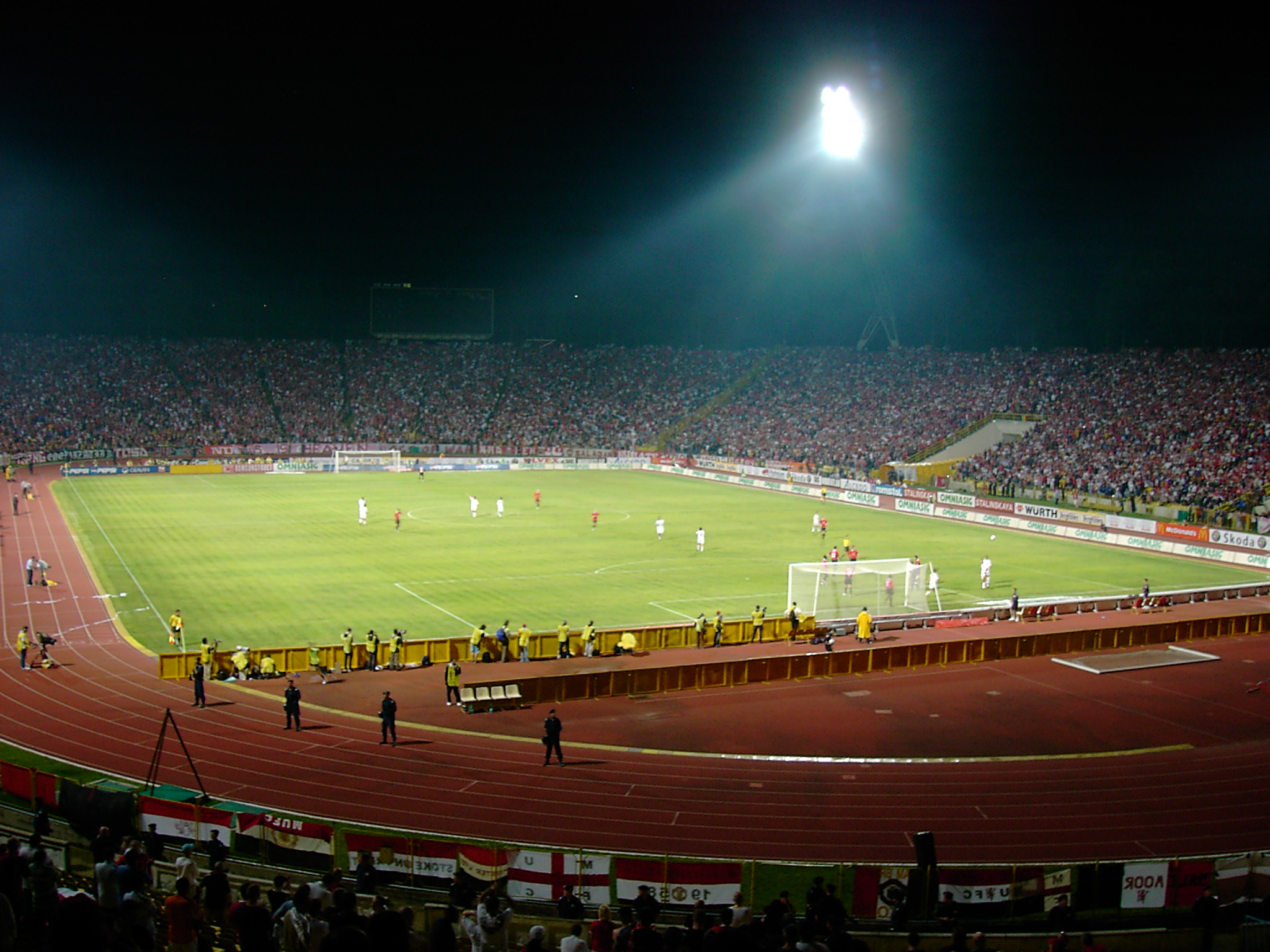
2004–05 UEFA Champions League third qualifying round match between Dinamo and Manchester United at Lia Manoliu stadium in Bucharest.

For the 2004–05 season Dinamo played a thrilling game vs. Manchester United in Bucharest, at the National Stadium, in the third qualification round of the UEFA Champions League, but lost 1–2. This game was significant because it showed a lot of progress from the last attempts to qualify for the group phase of the Champions League. The 2nd leg was lost at Old Trafford 3–0.

A highlight in recent times came in the UEFA Cup 2005–06 season when Dinamo thrashed Premier League club Everton 5–1. Dinamo went on to win the tie 5–2. Also, they managed to beat CSKA Moscow (Cup Holders) 1–0 but they missed the European Spring due to a couple of close games lost in the last few seconds. The most controversial was played at Stade Vélodrome, where Dinamo lost 2–1 against Olympique de Marseille although Octavian Chihaia scored the equalizer in the dying seconds, but the referee didn't validate the goal because he was turn towards the center of the field, preparing to end the game.

In the 2006–07 season they did qualify for the European Spring where they were eliminated by Benfica after a 0–1 loss at Da Luz and a 1–2 loss at home. Domestically, the team crushed most of its opponents in the first 19 rounds, ending up autumn champions, 13 points ahead of second place and then they secured their 18th title with four rounds to spare. The Romanian champions could have qualified directly to the Champions League group stage for the 2007–08 season, if Manchester United or Chelsea would have won the competition in the 2006–07 season. But AC Milan became champions, and Dinamo had to play a preliminary round before the group phase.

Dinamo failed again to enter the Champions League group phase, being eliminated in the third qualifying round by Lazio Roma. After four manager changes, Dinamo finished the 2007–08 season on the 4th spot in Liga I. In the summer of 2008, Mircea Rednic returned as coach having the mission to win the title and qualify Dinamo to the Champions League, but after the team finished the first part of the season as leader, they failed at the finish line and ended only third.

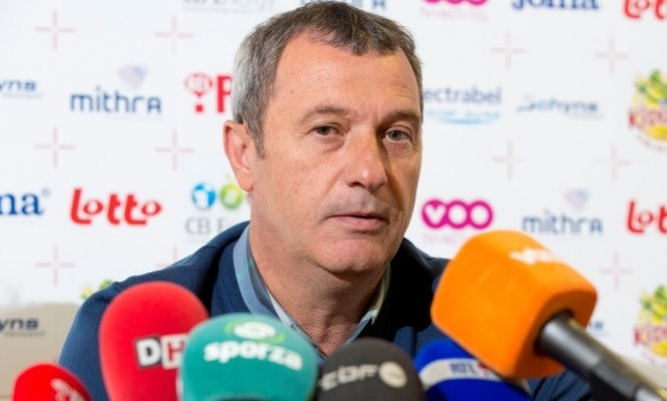
Mircea Rednic, the last coach that won the title with Dinamo

In the 2009–10 season, Dinamo played in the playoff for Europa League against Czech football club FC Slovan Liberec. In the first leg the supporters invaded the pitch causing the match to be abandoned in the 88th minute when the score was 2–0 for Slovan. The UEFA Control and Disciplinary Body awarded a default 0–3 defeat against Dinamo. One week later in Liberec Dinamo managed a memorable comeback and qualified in the Europa League 2009–10 group stage after winning 3–0 in Liberec after 90 and 120 minutes and winning 9–8 at penalties after 10 series. The domestic season was yet another unsuccessful one, finishing 6th in the championships.

Dinamo finished 6th in the 2010–11 season and qualified for the Cup finals against FCSB, but lost due to an own goal. For the 2011–12 season, club started with a new coach, ex-Dinamo player Liviu Ciobotariu.

After a disappointing defeat against Vorskla Poltava in the Europa League Play-Off, Dinamo is leading the Romanian Championship after 10 rounds with the best offense and defense in the championship despite selling Gabriel Torje to the Italian team Udinese with only Dorel Stoica and Srdjan Luchin completing the squad for the new season.

At the end of the autumn season, Dinamo was leading the table by one point ahead of CFR Cluj and started the spring one with a 2–0 win against Gaz Metan Mediaș in the first ever game played by the Red Dogs on the Național Arena in front of a season record of 20,000 spectators that filled the first tier of the brand new stadium. Even in this circumstances, the team had a very disappointing spring run in the league and finished 5th, with 62 points in 34 matches. Still, Dinamo managed to win 2 trophies, the Romanian Cup, in a final against Rapid, qualifying in the process for the Europa League Play-off and the Romanian Super Cup against CFR Cluj.

=== 2013–2017: Changing of ownership and insolvency ===
In March 2013, businessman Ionuț Negoiță bought the club from Nicolae Badea. The 2012–13 season ended with the same team as before the changing of the ownership, but after the season, Negoiță started his moves. He appointed former Dinamo glory Gheorghe Mulțescu as head coach, bought a new president, Constantin Anghelache and a new boss for the youth academy, Gabi Răduță. Things didn't work as hoped and in September 2013, Mulțescu was sacked. The decision came because Dinamo won only nine points in the first eight rounds of the Liga I season. Mulțescu's replacement was Flavius Stoican who was promoted from the second team. With Stoican at helm, Dinamo started to climb and in March 2014, the team was close to the podium. They finished the season on the fourth spot and reached the semifinals of the Romanian Cup, where they were ousted by FCSB.

In May 2014, Ionuț Negoiță announced that the club began the procedures to enter the insolvency. The Bucharest Court accepted the request in June 2014. Thus, the Licence Committee from the Romanian Federation decided to withdraw Dinamo's rights to enter the Europa League. On 24 September 2015, the Bucharest Municipal Court ruled that Dinamo met the criteria to end the insolvency process. But the club wasn't able to enter the European competitions, thus, despite ending the season on the 4th position, Dinamo didn't participate in the Europa League. In the 2016–17 Liga I season, Dinamo finished third in the play-off and qualified for the Europa League. In the 2017–18 UEFA Europa League season, Dinamo met the Spanish club Athletic Bilbao, in the third qualifying round. The first match, in Bucharest, ended 1–1, with the Brazilian Rivaldinho scoring for Dinamo. But Athletic won the second match 3–0 and Dinamo was eliminated. The following two seasons in Liga I, Dinamo failed to qualify for the play-off and missed the European cups.

=== 2017–present: Troubled times and first relegation ===
Dinamo failed to reach the play-offs for three consecutive seasons (2018 to 2020) and with each season ended in a lower tier than before. After the ninth place in 2019, Dinamo entered the battle against relegation in the 2019–20 Liga I season. The owner, Ionuț Negoiță, wanted to sell the club, but nobody came with a serious proposal and the fans association bought 20% of the club's shares. Adrian Mihalcea was named head-coach in March 2020, but made his debut in June, after the COVID-19 lockdown ended. Mihalcea began his tenure with four losses in the first four games in charge and Dinamo reached bottom in the championship. On 5 July, Dinamo won against Academica Clinceni and hauled themselves off the bottom position but stayed in the relegation zone. The next game ended in a draw, at home, against Politehnica Iași. Thus, Mihalcea was sacked, after only seven games in charge. Gheorghe Mulțescu came back as Dinamo's head coach, for the fourth time.

On 6 August, the Liga I season was frozen and Dinamo didn't play all its postponed games, finishing the season in 13th place. But the club was spared from relegation after the Romanian Federation decided to increase the number of teams in Liga I from 14 to 16. Thus, only the 14th place played a relegation/promotion play-off against the third place in Liga II.

On 13 August 2020, the club was purchased by Benel International SA, a Spanish company represented by Pablo Cortacero. Dinamo transferred several contract-free players with impressive resumes and big salaries. Cosmin Contra came as head coach and footballers like Borja Valle, Aleix Garcia, and Juan Camara arrived with salaries of up to 33,000 euros per month. But Dinamo had a poor start of the season and the new owner, Pablo Cortacero, did not transfer any money to the players for several months. Almost all the foreign players submitted their memoirs so that they could leave free. Dinamo was left with huge debts, of approximately 7 million euros, and at the beginning of the 2021–22 season, the club went into insolvency again. The 2021–22 season ended with a relegation to Liga II. Dinamo ended 14th the regular season and the play-out, then played the promotion/relegation play-off against Universitatea Cluj, third place in Liga II. U.Cluj won the first match, 2–0 at Cluj Arena. The second leg, at Dinamo stadium, ended 1–1. Thus, Dinamo Bucharest relegated for the first time in its history.

In March 2022, the businessman Dorin Șerdean became the majority shareholder of Dinamo after an agreement to take over the club from Pablo Cortacero. In February 2023, Şerdean accepted the offer received from the Red&White company to sell the club. The owners of Red&White are Andrei Nicolescu, who owns 60% of the company, and Eugen Voicu, who owns 40%. The administrator of Red&White is Eugen Voicu. During the promotion play-off, Dinamo defeated Argeș Pitești with a whopping 6–1, before they lost 4–2 in the second leg, a record breaking play-off with loads of goals, 8–5 in aggregate, which took Dinamo back to the Liga I after just one season of staying in Liga II.

== Crest and colours ==
Dinamo's colours are red and white. The current crest includes the profile of two red dogs and also a gold star above them, representing the club's tenth league title.

== Stadium ==
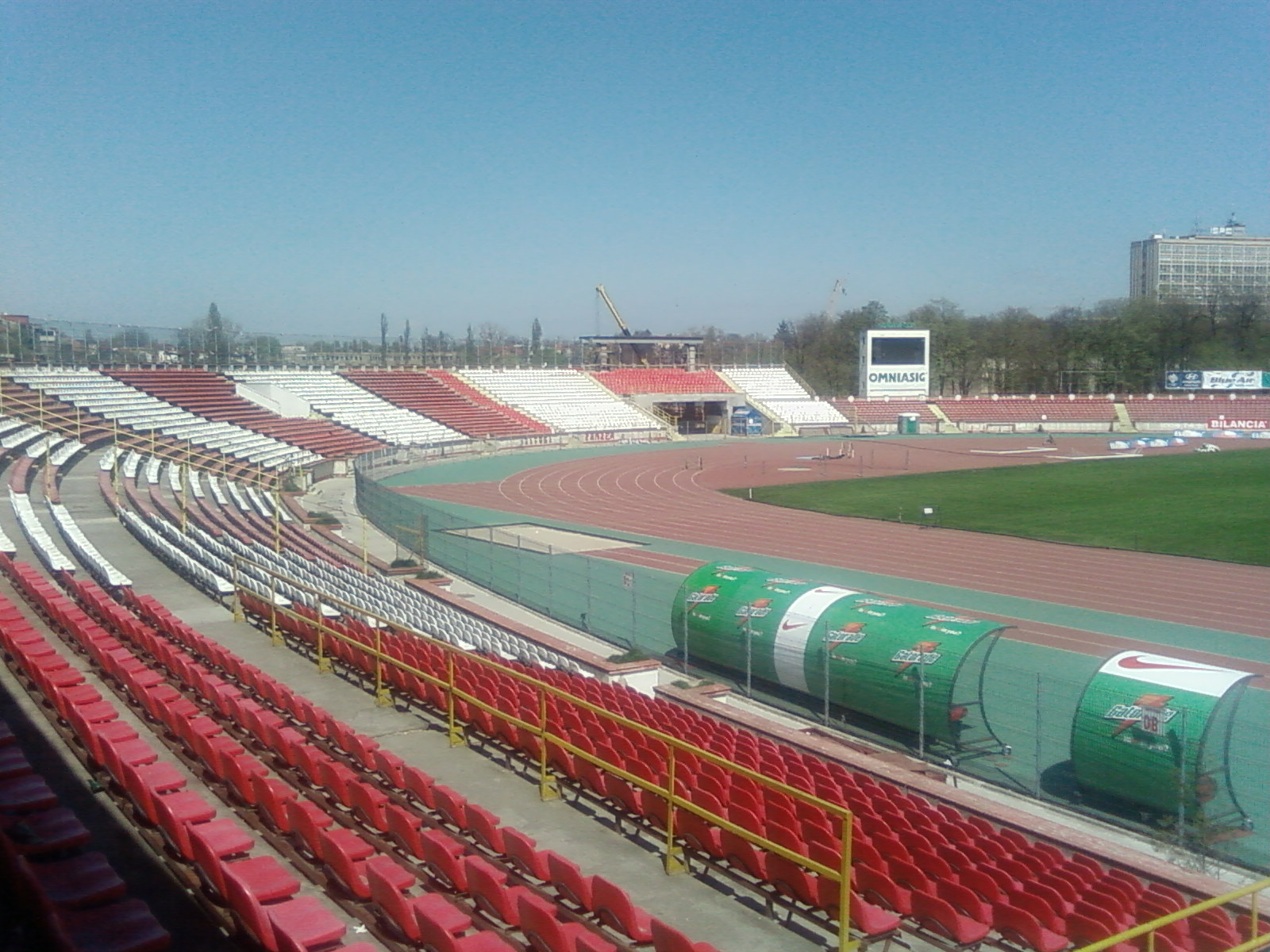
The Dinamo Stadium ( The Pit )

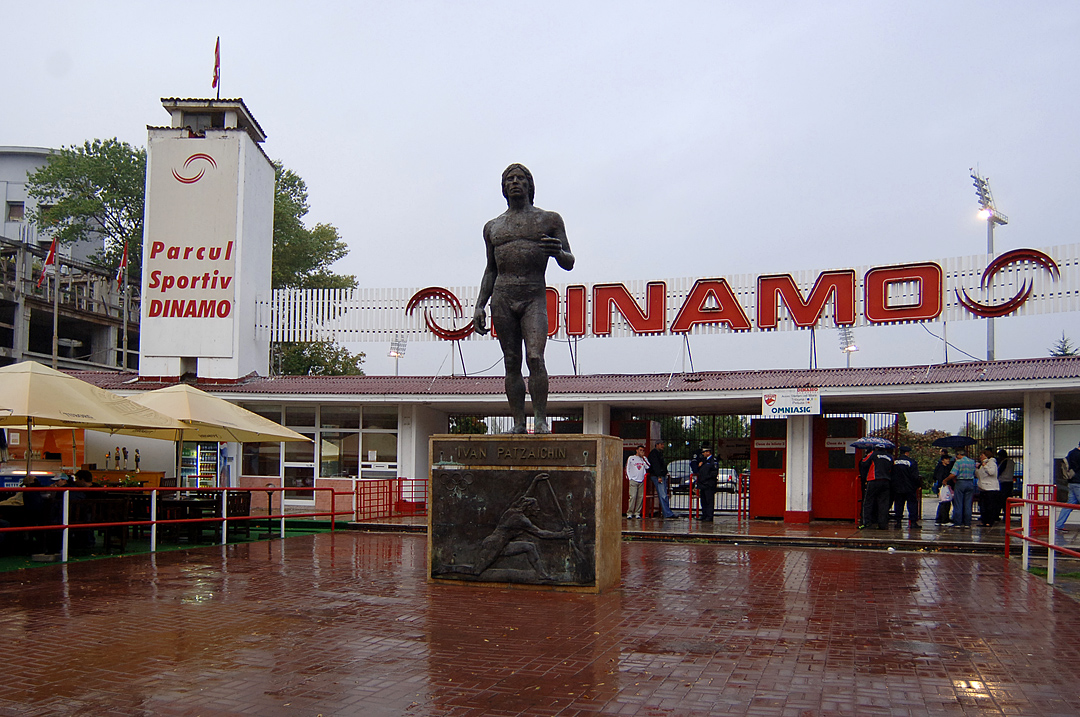
Dinamo's stadium in front is the statue of Ivan Patzaichin

Dinamo played its home matches at Dinamo Stadium from the arena’s inauguration in 1951 until 2022, when the stadium was no longer licensed to host official matches.

Dinamo plays significant matches, such as against rivals FCSB, at Arena Națională. From 2022 onward, the team plays its home matches at the newly built Stadionul Arcul de Triumf.

From 2029, Dinamo will play at the new Mircea Lucescu Arena.

== Support ==
Dinamo has an estimated 13% support in Romania, making them the second most supported Romanian club, after FCSB. The largest concentration of fans is in Bucharest, mainly in the northeast and central areas of the city. The club also has important fan bases on other parts of the country and where significant bases of Romanians are found.

Dinamo fans paying homage to Cătălin Hîldan in 2005.

The roots of the Dinamo ultras (fans) movement can be found in 1995 when groups like Dracula and Rams Pantelimon appeared in the North End. In 1996 a group called Nuova Guardia was formed, and became the leading group in the stadium and later on in the entire Romanian ultras movement. Following the death of the former captain, Cătălin Hîldan, in 2000, the fans renamed the North End of Dinamo's stadium to Peluza Catalin Hîldan (PCH Stand) in his honor. The majority of supporters are located in the PCH, but several factions have moved to the South End.

=== Rivalries & friendships ===
Dinamo's significant rivalry is with FCSB, with matches between them dubbed the Eternal derby. Both clubs have had the most popularity in Romania with as strong reactions from its respective fans in clashes in the stadium during games and elsewhere. In 1997, Dinamo's fans set a sector of the Stadionul Ghencea on fire. On 16 August 2016, during FCSB's UEFA Champions League 0–5 play-off loss against Manchester City, Dinamo fans unveiled a banner that read Doar Dinamo București ("Only Dinamo Bucharest").

The club's second most important rivalry is against Rapid București. In the 1990s, there was fierce competition between the two in winning the championship title.

Another rivalry is held against Universitatea Craiova; both finished with the same number of points in the 1972–73 Divizia A, but Dinamo was given the title because of their superior goal difference. A conflict has existed ever since. Other smaller rivalries exist, such as the one against Petrolul Ploiești.

Dinamo's fans have a good friendship with Universitatea Cluj's fans. The friendship started in the mid-1990s, both ultras groups being linked with "the mentality, fanaticism and nationalist side" and the common hate for FCSB. Dinamo have unofficial friendship with Serbian club Crvena Zvezda. Friendship between this two clubs, are based on Orthodox Christianity same religion.

== Youth program ==
Dinamo has an important infrastructure for training professionalism in the sport and developing interest in the youth area. The youth center organises a system based on nine age groups between nine and 18 years. Dinamo has around 180 juniors.

All the groups play in the competitions organised by the Bucharest Football Association and in those created by the Romanian Federation. Youths around 16–18 years old are promoted to the second team, Dinamo II.

The youth center has its base in the Dinamo Sports Center, where they have eight dressing rooms for the players, one for the coaches, one for the referees, a medical center and a store room for the equipment. Also, the center has many training grounds, among them the Piți Varga field.

== Honours ==
=== Domestic ===
- Divizia A / Liga I
  - Champions (18): 1955, 1961–62, 1962–63, 1963–64, 1964–65, 1970–71, 1972–73, 1974–75, 1976–77, 1981–82, 1982–83, 1983–84, 1989–90, 1991–92, 1999–2000, 2001–02, 2003–04, 2006–07
  - Runners-up (20): 1951, 1952, 1953, 1956, 1958–59, 1960–61, 1966–67, 1968–69, 1973–74, 1975–76, 1978–79, 1980–81, 1984–85, 1986–87, 1987–88, 1988–89, 1992–93, 1998–99, 2000–01, 2004–05
- Cupa României
  - Winners (13): 1958–59, 1963–64, 1967–68, 1981–82, 1983–84, 1985–86, 1989–90, 1999–2000, 2000–01, 2002–03, 2003–04, 2004–05, 2011–12
  - Runners-up (10): 1954, 1968–69, 1969–70, 1970–71, 1986–87, 1987–88, 1988–89, 2001–02, 2010–11, 2015–16
- Cupa Ligii
  - Winners (1): 2016–17
- Supercupa României
  - Winners (2): 2005, 2012
  - Runners-up (4): 2001, 2002, 2003, 2007

=== Continental ===
- European Cup
  - Semi-finalists (1): 1983–84
- Cup Winners' Cup
  - Semi-finalists (1): 1989–90

== Players ==
=== First-team squad ===
As of 8 September 2026

Note: Flags indicate national team as defined under FIFA eligibility rules; some limited exceptions apply. Players may hold more than one non-FIFA nationality.

No.	Pos.	Nation	Player
1	GK	CMR	Devis Epassy
5	DF	MKD	Imran Fetai
6	MF	BEL	Matthias Verreth
7	FW	ROU	Alexandru Musi
8	MF	POR	Diogo Pinto
9	FW	FRA	Mamoudou Karamoko
10	MF	ROU	Cătălin Cîrjan (Captain)
15	DF	ISR	Nikita Stoinov
18	FW	ERI	Oliver Hintsa
19	DF	ROU	Răzvan Radu
20	DF	ROU	David Irimia
21	MF	ROU	Cristian Mihai
22	DF	ESP	Darío Benavides
23	MF	ROU	Ianis Tarbă

No.	Pos.	Nation	Player
26	FW	ROU	Adrian Mazilu
29	FW	ESP	Alberto Soro
30	DF	ROU	Matteo Duțu
31	DF	ROU	Raul Opruț (Vice-captain)
33	GK	ROU	Costin Ungureanu
36	GK	MAR	Alaa Bellaarouch (on loan from Braga)
44	DF	ESP	Martín Pascual
47	FW	ROU	George Pușcaș
66	DF	ROU	Ștefan Opriș
73	GK	ROU	Alexandru Roșca
77	FW	SCO	Danny Armstrong
90	MF	ROU	Andrei Mărginean (3rd captain)
97	FW	NED	Dean Zandbergen

=== Out on loan ===
Note: Flags indicate national team as defined under FIFA eligibility rules; some limited exceptions apply. Players may hold more than one non-FIFA nationality.

No.	Pos.	Nation	Player
17	FW	UKR	Vadym Kyrychenko (at Cetatea Suceava until 30 June 2027)
24	DF	ROU	Mihnea Toader (at 1599 Șelimbăr until 30 June 2027)
98	MF	ROU	Alexandru Irimia (at Metaloglobus București until 30 June 2027)
—	GK	ROU	Denis Oncescu (at CS Dinamo București until 30 June 2027)
—	GK	ROU	Codruț Sandu (at Corvinul Hunedoara until 30 June 2027)
—	DF	ROU	Andrei Avram (at CS Dinamo București until 30 June 2027)
—	DF	ROU	Constantin Dobîndă (at Urban Titu until 30 June 2027)

No.	Pos.	Nation	Player
—	DF	ROU	Raul Oprea (at Dunărea Călărași until 30 June 2027)
—	MF	ROU	Cristian Licsandru (at Concordia Chiajna until 30 June 2027)
—	MF	NGR	Peter Maapia (at CS Dinamo București until 30 June 2027)
—	MF	ROU	Adriano Manole (at CSL Ștefănești until 30 June 2027)
—	MF	ROU	Bogdan Pitulac (at SCM Râmnicu Vâlcea until 30 June 2027)
—	FW	ROU	Dennis Dicu (at Blejoi until 30 June 2027)

=== Retired numbers ===
Note: Flags indicate national team as defined under FIFA eligibility rules; some limited exceptions apply. Players may hold more than one non-FIFA nationality.

No.	Pos.	Nation	Player
11	MF	ROU	Cătălin Hîldan (1994–2000) – Posthumous honour) (Note: Since Unicul Căpitan (The Only Captain) died, no player will wear the number 11 shirt at Dinamo București, since the club decided to retire the shirt out of respect and posthumous honor for legend Cătălin Hîldan.)
12	-	ROU	"The twelfth man" - dedication to fans
14	MF	CMR	Patrick Ekeng (2016) – Posthumous honour) (Note: Patrick Ekeng died at Floreasca Hospital after he had gone into a coma in a match on 6 May 2016 against Viitorul Constanța where he joined as a substitute.)

== Club officials ==
=== Board of directors ===
Role	Name
Owners	(Romania) Red&White Management – 87.87% (Romania) APCH/DDB Supporters Association – 12.06% (Romania) ACS FC Dinamo București – 0.03% (Romania) Dinamo Socios 0.02% (Romania) Sorin Preda – 0.01% (Romania) Andrei Cionca – 0.01%
President	(Romania) Andrei Nicolescu
Board Members	(Romania) Eugen Voicu (Romania) Dan Gătăianțu (Romania) Bogdan Pavel
Sporting Director	(Romania) Cosmin Mihălescu
Organizer of Competitions	(Romania) Sabin Ghiță
Marketing Director	(Romania) Romeo Bănică
Economic Director	(Romania) Dan Gătăianțu
Ticketing Director	(Romania) Adrian Dumitrescu
Merchandising	(Romania) Alexandru Marin
Head of Youth Development	(Romania) Marius Dulca
Coordinator of Youth Development	(Romania) Florin Răducioiu
Head of Scouting	(Romania) Ștefan Zarnica
Head of Security	(Romania) Costinel Radu
Delegate	(Romania) Lucas Cladoveanu
Team Manager	(Romania) Sabin Ghiță
Head of Legal	(Romania) Dragoș Petcu
Press Officer	(Romania) Bogdan Alecu

- Last updated: 22 July 2026
- Source: Board of directors

=== Current technical staff ===
Role	Name
Head coach	(Portugal) Nuno Campos
Assistant coaches	(Portugal) Gonçalo Cruz (Portugal) João Bagão (Romania) Adrian Marcu
Goalkeeping coach	(Portugal) Felipe Peralta
Fitness coaches	(Romania) Mădălin Udrea (Netherlands) Brian van der Steen
Video analysts	(Romania) Andrei Bendeac (Romania) Iulian Militaru
Club doctor	(Romania) Dan Tănase
Physiotherapists	(Moldova) Dumitru Bzovîi (Spain) Rodrigo Evangelisti
Masseurs	(Romania) Alexandru Sîrbu (Romania) Bogdan Ionescu
Nutritionist	(Spain) Javier Rodríguez
Kit man	(Romania) Emilian Stanciu

- Last updated: 18 June 2026
- Source: Technical staff

== Statistics and records ==
=== European cups all-time statistics ===
Updated 3 August 2017.

Competition	S	P	W	D	L	GF	GA	GD
UEFA Champions League / European Cup	18	66	24	10	32	96	106	–10
UEFA Cup Winners' Cup / European Cup Winners' Cup	5	20	8	4	8	25	18	+7
UEFA Europa League / UEFA Cup	23	90	37	14	39	147	127	+20
UEFA Intertoto Cup	1	4	1	0	3	4	6	–2
Total	47	180	70	28	82	272	257	+15

Records in the league:

- Consecutive winning games: 17 games (12 June 1988 – 27 November 1988)
- Best unbeaten run: 47 games (26 May 1991 – 20 September 1992)
- Player with most appearances: (Romania) Cornel Dinu (454)
- Top scorer: (Romania) Dudu Georgescu (207)
- Player with most appearances in international games: (Romania) Claudiu Niculescu (43)
- Top scorer in international games: (Romania) Claudiu Niculescu (18)

Records in the European competition:

- Biggest home win: Dinamo 11–0 (Northern Ireland) Crusaders F.C. (1973–74) (still the biggest margin of victory in the history of the European Cup)
- Biggest away win: (Cyprus) Alki Larnaca F.C. 0–9 Dinamo (1979–80)
- Heaviest home defeat: Dinamo 0–3 (Netherlands) Feyenoord (1971–72), Dinamo 0–3 (Turkey) Galatasaray (2009–10)
- Heaviest away defeat: (Bulgaria) PFC CSKA Sofia 8–1 Dinamo (1956–57)

== Notable former players ==
Dinamo's record appearance-maker is Cornel Dinu, who made 454 appearances between 1966 and 1983. Ionel Dănciulescu has made the second most appearances with 355.

== Notable former coaches ==
Nicolae Dumitru is the most successful head coach in Dinamo's history, with five league titles and two Romanian Cups. Ioan Andone won five trophies for Dinamo, winning one title in Liga I, three Romanian Cups and one Supercup.
