= 2025–26 FC Dinamo București season =

Dinamo București
2025–26 season
- Chairman: Andrei Nicolescu
- Head coach: Željko Kopić
- Stadium: Arena Națională & Arcul de Triumf
- Liga 1: 4th
- Cupa României: Semi-finals
- Top goalscorer: League: Cătălin Cîrjan (7); Alexandru Musi (7); All: Cătălin Cîrjan (8); Alexandru Musi (8)
- Average home league attendance: 10,368
Home colours	Away colours	Third colours

The 2025–26 season was the 77th season of FC Dinamo București and their 3rd consecutive season in the top flight of Romanian football, 76 seasons are in the top flight. In addition to the domestic league, Dinamo are also participating in the Cupa României.

== Squad at the end of the season ==
Updated last, 24 February 2026

No.	Name	Nationality	Position	Date of Birth (Age)	Signed from	Signed in	Contract end
Goalkeepers
1	Devis Epassy	(Cameroon)	GK	2 February 1993 (aged 33)	(Cyprus) Karmiotissa FC	9 July 2025	30 June 2027
28	Mario Din-Licaciu	(Romania)	GK	1 September 2008 (aged 17)	Academy	11 August 2025	Unknown
73	Alexandru Roșca	(Romania)	GK	12 November 2003 (aged 22)	1599 Șelimbăr	1 July 2024	30 June 2029
-	Denis Oncescu	(Romania)	GK	15 August 2004 (aged 21)	Academy	16 April 2021	30 June 2028
Defenders
3	Raul Opruț	(Romania)	LB	4 January 1998 (aged 28)	(Belgium) KV Kortrijk	1 July 2024	30 June 2029
4	Kennedy Boateng	(Togo)	CB	29 November 1996 (aged 29)	Austria Lustenau	1 July 2024	30 June 2026
13	Alexandru Tabuncic	(Moldova)	RB	27 May 2006 (aged 20)	Voința Crevedia	11 July 2025	30 June 2030
15	Nikita Stoinov	(Israel)	CB	24 August 2005 (aged 20)	(Israel) Maccabi Netanya	7 July 2025	30 June 2029
26	Mihnea Toader	(Romania)	CB	26 July 2006 (aged 19)	Academy	1 July 2025	Unknown
27	Maxime Sivis	(Democratic Republic of the Congo)	RB	1 April 1998 (aged 28)	(France) EA Guingamp	17 July 2024	30 June 2028
30	Matteo Duțu	(Romania)	CB	23 November 2005 (aged 20)	(Italy) AC Milan	23 January 2026	30 June 2029
32	Jordan Ikoko	(Democratic Republic of the Congo)	RB	3 February 1994 (aged 32)	(Cyprus) Omonia 29M	9 July 2025	30 June 2026
55	Valentin Țicu	(Romania)	LB	19 September 2000 (aged 25)	Petrolul Ploiești	2 January 2026	30 June 2026
Midfielders
6	Cristian Licsandru	(Romania)	CM	27 March 2003 (aged 23)	Free Agent	15 April 2024	Unknown
8	Eddy Gnahoré (VC)	(France)	CM	14 November 1993 (aged 32)	(Italy) Ascoli Calcio	17 January 2024	30 June 2026
10	Cătălin Cîrjan (C)	(Romania)	CM	1 December 2002 (aged 23)	(England) Arsenal FC	1 July 2024	30 June 2029
17	Georgi Milanov	(Bulgaria)	AM	19 February 1992 (aged 34)	Free Agent	19 January 2024	30 June 2026
21	Cristian Mihai	(Romania)	DM	23 September 2004 (aged 21)	UTA Arad	1 July 2025	30 June 2030
88	Matteo N’Giuwu	(Romania)	CM	16 April 2008 (aged 18)	Academy	9 March 2026	Unknown
90	Andrei Mărginean	(Romania)	CM	3 July 2001 (aged 24)	(Italy) Sassuolo Calcio	18 July 2024	30 June 2028
-	Darius Gavrilă	(Romania)	AM	5 January 2007 (aged 19)	Academy	1 July 2024	30 June 2027
Forwards
7	Alexandru Musi	(Romania)	LW	17 July 2004 (aged 21)	FCSB	1 July 2025	30 June 2029
9	Mamoudou Karamoko	(France)	LW	8 June 1999 (aged 27)	(Denmark) FC Copenhagen	7 July 2025	30 June 2027
19	Adrian Mazilu	(Romania)	RW	13 September 2005 (aged 20)	(England) Brighton & Hove Albion FC	31 August 2025	30 June 2029
20	Antonio Bordușanu	(Romania)	RW	10 August 2004 (aged 21)	Academy	6 February 2021	30 June 2027
23	Ianis Tarbă	(Romania)	RW	4 July 2006 (aged 19)	(Spain) RC Celta de Vigo	16 January 2026	30 June 2028
24	Adrian Caragea	(Romania)	LW	7 September 2005 (aged 20)	(Italy) Sassuolo Calcio	1 July 2024	30 June 2028
29	Alberto Soro	(Spain)	RW	9 March 1999 (aged 27)	(Spain) Granada CF	7 August 2024	30 June 2027
47	George Puşcaş	(Romania)	ST	8 April 1996 (aged 30)	Free Agent	24 February 2026	30 June 2027
77	Daniel Armstrong	(Scotland)	RW	11 October 1997 (aged 28)	(Scotland) Kilmarnock FC	1 July 2025	30 June 2027
99	Alexandru Pop	(Romania)	ST	1 February 2000 (aged 26)	Oțelul Galați	1 January 2025	30 June 2027
-	Godwin Udosen	(Nigeria)	RW	3 March 2008 (aged 18)	(Nigeria) Blessed Stars Academy	24 August 2024	Unknown
-	Vadym Kyrychenko	(Ukraine)	ST	6 January 2006 (aged 20)	UTA Arad	1 July 2025	30 June 2029
Out on Loan
5	Răzvan Pașcalău	(Romania)	CB	5 May 2004 (aged 22)	(Italy) US Lecce	1 July 2024	30 June 2029
22	Casian Soare	(Romania)	CM	24 November 2006 (aged 19)	1599 Șelimbăr	20 January 2025	30 June 2028
30	Raul Rotund	(Romania)	ST	17 November 2005 (aged 20)	Universitatea Cluj	1 July 2024	30 June 2028
31	Codruț Sandu	(Romania)	GK	17 April 2006 (aged 20)	Rapid București	1 July 2025	30 June 2029
33	Costin Ungureanu	(Romania)	GK	4 April 2008 (aged 18)	Academy	11 August 2025	Unknown
48	Luca Bărbulescu	(Romania)	ST	31 March 2007 (aged 19)	Free Agent	1 July 2025	30 June 2028
80	Andrei Ionică	(Romania)	LW	2 March 2005 (aged 21)	Unirea Bascov	18 July 2024	30 June 2028
-	David Irimia	(Romania)	RB	12 May 2006 (aged 20)	Academy	27 February 2023	30 June 2029
-	Matei Marin	(Romania)	RB	19 May 2006 (aged 20)	Steaua București	5 September 2025	30 June 2028
-	Ianys Neculai	(Romania)	RB	22 August 2007 (aged 18)	Academy	30 July 2025	30 June 2030
-	Costin Amzăr	(Romania)	LB	11 July 2003 (aged 22)	Academy	1 September 2020	30 June 2027
-	Peter Maapia	(Nigeria)	AM	6 January 2006 (aged 20)	(Nigeria) Academy Ikon Allah	6 September 2024	30 June 2028
-	Alexandru Irimia	(Romania)	CM	12 May 2006 (aged 20)	Academy	27 February 2023	30 June 2029
-	Ahmed Bala	(Nigeria)	RW	18 May 2005 (aged 21)	(Nigeria) Academy Ikon Allah	3 September 2024	30 June 2028
-	Hussaini Sanusi	(Nigeria)	RW	6 June 2006 (aged 20)	(Nigeria) Academy Ikon Allah	6 September 2024	30 June 2028
-	Valentin Dumitrache	(Romania)	ST	29 March 2003 (aged 23)	Farul Constanța	6 August 2024	30 June 2027

== Pre-season and friendlies ==
14 June 2025 Friendly	Dinamo	0–3	Petrolul Ploiești	Balotești
10:30 EEST (UTC+3)		Report	? 70' ? 78' ? 88' (pen.)	Stadium: Baza Săftica

21 June 2025 Friendly	CS Afumați	0–1	Dinamo	Afumați
10:30 EEST			Caragea 43'	Stadium: Comunal

28 June 2025 Friendly	(Poland) Motor Lublin	3–3	Dinamo	Nowiny
17:00 EEST	? 48' (pen.) ? 61', 109'	Report	Cîrjan 52'; Soare 97'; Abdallah 120' (pen.)	Stadium: Sportowy Nowiny

2 July 2025 Friendly	Dinamo	2–2	(Cyprus) AC Omonia	Nowiny
12:30 EEST	Cîrjan 14', 43'		? 66' ? 70'	Stadium: Sportowy Nowiny

6 July 2025 Friendly	CS Tunari	1–1	Dinamo	Tunari
10:30 EEST	? 75'		Bărbulescu 72'	Stadium: Tunari; Referee: Sebastian Colțescu

6 September 2025 Friendly	Dinamo	2–0	CS Dinamo București	Balotești
11:00 EEST (UTC+3)	Soro 34'; Lazăr 80'			Stadium: Baza Săftica; Referee: Sebastian Colțescu

12 October 2025 Friendly	(North Macedonia) FK Pelister	2–0	Dinamo	Bitola
18:30 EEST	Toader 75' (o.g.) ? 88' (pen.)			Stadium: Petar Miloševski

16 November 2025 Friendly	Dinamo	0–3	Metaloglobus București	Balotești
11:00 EEST (UTC+3)			? 17' ? 58' ? 64' (pen.)	Stadium: Baza Săftica; Referee: Sebastian Colțescu

7 January 2026 Friendly	Dinamo	2–0	(Switzerland) BSC Young Boys	Antalya
16:00 EEST (UTC+3)	Stoinov 19'; Karamoko 44'

11 January 2026 Friendly	Dinamo	3–2	(South Korea) Gangwon FC	Antalya
14:00 EEST (UTC+3)	Cîrjan 10'; Mazilu 24'; Karamoko 64'		? 70' (pen.), 77'

28 March 2026 Friendly	Dinamo	3–1	CS Dinamo București	Balotești
11:00 EEST (UTC+3)	Armstrong 52'; Pop 59'; Pușcaș 74'		? 41'	Stadium: Baza Săftica

== Competitions ==
=== Liga I ===
==== Regular season ====
===== League table =====
Pos	Team	Pld	W	D	L	GF	GA	GD	Pts	Qualification
3	Universitatea Cluj	30	16	6	8	48	27	+21	54	Advances to Play-off
4	CFR Cluj	30	15	8	7	49	40	+9	53	Advances to Play-off
5	Dinamo București	30	14	10	6	42	28	+14	52	Advances to Play-off
6	Argeș Pitești	30	15	5	10	37	28	+9	50	Advances to Play-off
7	FCSB	30	13	7	10	48	40	+8	46	Advances to Play-out

Source: LPF (in Romanian)
Rules for classification: 1) Points; 2) Head-to-head points; 3) Head-to-head goal difference; 4) Head-to-head goals scored; 5) Goal difference; 6) Goals scored; 7) Play-off.

=== Matches ===
14 July 2025 1	Csíkszereda Miercurea Ciuc	2–2	Dinamo	Miercurea Ciuc
21:30 EEST (UTC+3)	Sivis 2' (o.g.) ? 11'		Musi 16'; Gnahoré 43'	Stadium: Municipal; Referee: Rareș Vidican

21 July 2025 2	Dinamo	0–0	FC Botoșani	București
21:30 EEST (UTC+3)				Stadium: Arcul de Triumf; Referee: Sorin Vădana

27 July 2025 3	Oțelul Galați	2–1	Dinamo	Galați
21:30 EEST (UTC+3)	? 18' ? 62'		Sivis 49'	Stadium: Oțelul; Referee: Szabolcs Kovacs

2 August 2025 4	Dinamo	4–3	FCSB	București
21:30 EEST (UTC+3)	Musi 34'; Armstrong 45+4' (pen.), 57' (pen.), 79'		? 19' (pen.), 50', 90+1' (pen.)	Stadium: Arena Națională; Referee: Horațiu Feșnic

8 August 2025 5	Metaloglobus București	0–1	Dinamo	Clinceni
21:30 EEST (UTC+3)			Cîrjan 15'	Stadium: Clinceni; Referee: Cristian Moldoveanu

15 August 2025 6	Dinamo	1–1	UTA Arad	București
21:30 EEST (UTC+3)	Karamoko 59'		? 33'	Stadium: Arena Națională; Referee: Sebastian Colțescu

23 August 2025 7	Universitatea Cluj	0–1	Dinamo	Cluj-Napoca
21:30 EEST (UTC+3)			Pop 89'	Stadium: Cluj Arena; Referee: George Găman

30 August 2025 8	Dinamo	2–0	Hermannstadt Sibiu	București
21:30 EEST (UTC+3)	Karamoko 48'; Boateng 73'			Stadium: Arena Națională; Referee: Andrei Moroiță

15 September 2025 9	Petrolul Ploiești	0–3	Dinamo	Ploiești
21:00 EEST (UTC+3)			Cîrjan 44'; Armstrong 60'; Sivis 90+6'	Stadium: Ilie Oană; Referee: Florin Chivulete

22 September 2025 10	Dinamo	1–1	Farul Constanța	București
21:00 EEST (UTC+3)	Milanov 8'		? 64'	Stadium: Arena Națională; Referee: Florin Andrei

26 September 2025 11	Universitatea Craiova	2–2	Dinamo	Craiova
21:00 EEST (UTC+3)	? 20' ? 49'		Musi 16'; Pop 90'	Stadium: Ion Oblemenco; Referee: Adrian Cojocaru

3 October 2025 12	Unirea Slobozia	0–1	Dinamo	Clinceni
20:30 EEST (UTC+3)			Perica 65'	Stadium: Clinceni; Referee: Rareş Vidican

19 October 2025 13	Dinamo	0–2	Rapid București	București
20:30 EEST (UTC+3)			Gnahore 59' (o.g.) ? 74'	Stadium: Arena Națională; Referee: Marian Barbu

24 October 2025 14	Argeș Pitești	1–1	Dinamo	Mioveni
20:30 EEST (UTC+3)	? 40'		Boateng 35'	Stadium: Orășenesc; Referee: Florin Andrei

31 October 2025 15	Dinamo	2–1	CFR Cluj	București
20:30 EEST (UTC+3)	Karamoko 90'; Soro 90+2'		? 69'	Stadium: Arena Națională; Referee: Radu Petrescu

8 November 2025 16	Dinamo	4–0	Csíkszereda Miercurea Ciuc	București
17:30 EEST (UTC+3)	Karamoko 19' (pen.), 50'; Musi 60'; Soro 83'			Stadium: Arena Națională; Referee: Iuliana Demetrescu

24 November 2025 17	FC Botoșani	1–1	Dinamo	Botoșani
20:30 EEST (UTC+3)	? 44'		Opruț 76'	Stadium: Municipal; Referee: Sebastian Colțescu

29 November 2025 18	Dinamo	1–0	Oțelul Galați	București
21:00 EEST (UTC+3)	Cîrjan 37'			Stadium: Arena Națională; Referee: Iulian Călin

6 December 2025 19	FCSB	0–0	Dinamo	București
20:30 EEST (UTC+3)				Stadium: Arena Națională; Referee: Marian Barbu

14 December 2025 20	Dinamo	4–0	Metaloglobus București	București
17:45 EEST (UTC+3)	Soro 24'; Mihai 68'; Perica 78'; Cîrjan 90+2'			Stadium: Arena Națională; Referee: Viorel Flueran

20 December 2025 21	UTA Arad	2–0	Dinamo	Arad
20:00 EEST (UTC+3)	? 33' ? 68'			Stadium: Francisc von Neuman; Referee: Szabolcs Kovacs

18 January 2026 22	Dinamo	1–0	Universitatea Cluj	București
20:30 EEST (UTC+3)	Karamoko 41'			Stadium: Arena Națională; Referee: Rereş Vidican

23 January 2026 23	Hermannstadt Sibiu	1–2	Dinamo	Sibiu
20:00 EEST (UTC+3)	? 77'		Opruț 71', 80'	Stadium: Municipal; Referee: Florin Andrei

30 January 2026 24	Dinamo	1–1	Petrolul Ploiești	București
20:00 EEST (UTC+3)	Armstrong 64'		? 82'	Stadium: Arcul de Triumf; Referee: Iulian Călin

4 February 2026 25	Farul Constanța	2–3	Dinamo	Ovidiu
20:30 EEST (UTC+3)	? 25' ? 71' (pen.)		Boateng 45', 75'; Pop 89'	Stadium: Central; Referee: Horațiu Feșnic

9 February 2026 26	Dinamo	1–1	Universitatea Craiova	București
20:00 EEST (UTC+3)	Soro 51'		? 65'	Stadium: Arena Națională; Referee: Istvan Kovacs

16 February 2026 27	Dinamo	1–0	Unirea Slobozia	București
20:00 EEST (UTC+3)	Opruț 71'			Stadium: Arena Națională; Referee: Sorin Vădana

21 February 2026 28	Rapid București	2–1	Dinamo	București
20:30 EEST (UTC+3)	? 30' ? 34'		Opruț 90+6'	Stadium: Arena Națională; Referee: Rareş Vidican

1 March 2026 29	Dinamo	0–1	Argeș Pitești	București
18:00 EEST (UTC+3)			? 74'	Stadium: Arena Națională; Referee: Marian Barbu

9 March 2026 30	CFR Cluj	2–0	Dinamo	Cluj-Napoca
20:00 EEST (UTC+3)	? 6' ? 43'			Stadium: Dr. Constantin Rădulescu; Referee: Szabolcs Kovacs

==== Play-off round ====
===== Play-off table =====
Pos	Team	Pld	W	D	L	GF	GA	GD	Pts	Qualification
2	Universitatea Cluj	10	6	1	3	13	11	+2	46	Qualification to Europa League first qualifying round (Note: The winner of the 2025–26 Cupa României (Universitatea Craiova) qualifies for the Europa League first qualifying round. Since the champions won the cup, this berth passed to the second place team.)
3	CFR Cluj	10	4	4	2	8	7	+1	43	Qualification to Conference League second qualifying round
4	Dinamo București	10	3	4	3	13	12	+1	39	Qualification to European competition play-offs
5	Rapid București	10	1	3	6	8	14	−6	34	
6	Argeș Pitești	10	1	4	5	6	10	−4	32	

Source: LPF (in Romanian)
Rules for classification: 1) Points; 2) Points without rounding; 3) Points in the regular season; 4) Head-to-head points; 5) Head-to-head goal difference; 6) Head-to-head goals scored; 7) Goal difference; 8) Goals scored; 9) Play-off (only if needed to decide champion or teams for UEFA competitions). (Note: only criteria 7 and 8 are applied to establish the classification during the competition.

=== Matches ===
14 March 2026 1	Rapid București	3–2	Dinamo	București
21:00 EEST (UTC+3)	? 38' ? 67' ? 85'		Armstrong 9' (pen.); Cîrjan 47'	Stadium: Rapid-Giulești; Referee: István Kovács

19 March 2026 2	Dinamo	0–1	Universitatea Craiova	București
20:30 EEST (UTC+3)			? 45+2'	Stadium: Arena Națională; Referee: Horațiu Feșnic

4 April 2026 3	Argeș Pitești	1–1	Dinamo	Mioveni
19:30 EEST (UTC+3)	? 44' (pen.)		Gnahore 76'	Stadium: Orășenesc; Referee: Szabolcs Kovacs

12 April 2026 4	CFR Cluj	1–1	Dinamo	Cluj-Napoca
21:00 EEST (UTC+3)	? 38'		Pop 23'	Stadium: Dr. Constantin Rădulescu; Referee: Marian Barbu

18 April 2026 5	Dinamo	2–1	Universitatea Cluj	București
21:00 EEST (UTC+3)	Cîrjan 75'; Musi 81'		? 84'	Stadium: Arena Națională; Referee: Rareş Vidican

26 April 2026 6	Dinamo	3–1	Rapid București	București
21:00 EEST (UTC+3)	Milanov 39'; Cîrjan 59'; Musi 71'		? 88'	Stadium: Arena Națională; Referee: Sebastian Colțescu

3 May 2026 7	Universitatea Craiova	2–1	Dinamo	Craiova
21:00 EEST (UTC+3)	? 61' ? 90+1'		Stoinov 59'	Stadium: Ion Oblemenco Stadium; Referee: Szabolcs Kovacs

10 May 2026 8	Dinamo	2–1	Argeș Pitești	București
19:00 EEST (UTC+3)	Pușcaș 3'; Boateng 90+1'		? 64'	Stadium: Arcul de Triumf; Referee: Florin Andrei

16 May 2026 9	Dinamo	0–0	CFR Cluj	București
21:00 EEST (UTC+3)				Stadium: Arcul de Triumf; Referee: Sebastian Colțescu

23 May 2026 10	Universitatea Cluj	1–1	Dinamo	Cluj-Napoca
20:30 EEST (UTC+3)	? 30'		Musi 85'	Stadium: Cluj Arena; Referee: Vlad Băban

=== European play-offs ===
29 May 2026 Final	Dinamo	1–2 (a.e.t.)	FCSB	București
20:30 EEST (UTC+3)	Karamoko 73'		Dawa 10'; Arad 107'	Stadium: Arcul de Triumf; Referee: Marian Barbu

=== Cupa României ===
==== Group stage ====
Pos	Team	Pld	W	D	L	GF	GA	GD	Pts	Qualification	DIN	HER	FAR	BOT	CON	CSD
1	FC Dinamo București	3	2	1	0	5	1	+4	7	Advance to knockout phase	—	2–0	—	—	—	—
2	Hermannstadt	3	2	0	1	4	3	+1	6	Advance to knockout phase	—	—	—	—	—	—
3	Farul Constanța	3	1	2	0	5	1	+4	5		0–0	—	—	—	—	—
4	Botoșani	3	1	1	1	5	6	−1	4		—	1–3	1–1	—	—	—
5	Concordia Chiajna	3	1	0	2	5	4	+1	3		—	0–1	—	2–3	—	—
6	CS Dinamo București	3	0	0	3	1	10	−9	0		1–3	—	0–4	—	0–3	—

Source: Flashscore
Legend: Blue = home team win; Yellow = draw; Red = away team win.

28 October 2025 Group stage	CS Dinamo București	1–3	Dinamo	București
21:00 EEST (UTC+3)	? 72'		Caragea 9', 18'; Musi 90'	Stadium: Arcul de Triumf; Referee: Darius Iviniş

3 December 2025 Group stage	Farul Constanța	0–0	Dinamo	Ovidiu
18:30 EEST (UTC+3)				Stadium: Central; Referee: Horațiu Feșnic

12 February 2026 Group stage	Dinamo	2–0	FC Hermannstadt	București
18:00 EEST (UTC+3)	Cîrjan 48'; Opruț 60'			Stadium: Arcul de Triumf; Referee: Cătălin Roman

==== Quarter-finals ====
5 March 2026 Quarter-finals	Dinamo	1–0	Metalul Buzău	București, Romania
20:00 EEST (UTC+3)	Pop 26'			Stadium: Arcul de Triumf; Referee: Robert Avram

==== Semi-finals ====
23 April 2026 Semi-finals	Dinamo	1–1 (a.e.t.) (1–4 p)	Universitatea Craiova	București, Romania
20:30 EEST (UTC+3)	Boateng 105+1'		? 118'	Stadium: Arena Națională; Referee: Marian Barbu
	Penalties
	Armstrong (penalty missed); Pop (penalty scored); Milanov (penalty missed)		? (penalty scored); ? (penalty scored); ? (penalty scored); ? (penalty scored)

== Statistics ==
=== Appearances and goals ===
Players with no appearances are not included on the list.

As of match played 29 May 2026

No.	Pos	Nat	Player	Total		Liga I		Cupa României		European play-offs	
No.	Pos	Nat	Player	Apps	Goals	Apps	Goals	Apps	Goals	Apps	Goals
1	GK	(Cameroon) CMR	Epassy	31	0	29	0	1	0	1	0
3	DF	(Romania) ROU	Opruț	45	6	39	5	4+1	1	1	0
4	DF	(Togo) TOG	Boateng	44	6	38	5	5	1	1	0
7	FW	(Romania) ROU	Musi	39	8	29+6	7	1+2	1	1	0
8	MF	(France) FRA	Gnahoré	43	2	37+1	2	4	0	1	0
9	FW	(France) FRA	Karamoko	28	7	18+8	6	1	0	0+1	1
10	MF	(Romania) ROU	Cîrjan	44	8	37+1	7	5	1	1	0
13	DF	(Moldova) MDA	Tabuncic	1	0	0+1	0	0	0		
15	DF	(Israel) ISR	Stoinov	43	1	37	1	5	0	1	0
17	MF	(Bulgaria) BUL	Milanov	37	2	7+25	2	2+2	0	1	0
19	FW	(Romania) ROU	Mazilu	15	0	4+9	0	0+2	0		
20	FW	(Romania) ROU	Bordușanu	4	0	0+3	0	1	0		
21	MF	(Romania) ROU	Mihai	28	1	5+20	1	2+1	0		
23	FW	(Romania) ROU	Tarbă	9	0	0+8	0	0	0	0+1	0
24	FW	(Romania) ROU	Caragea	19	2	4+11	0	2+1	2	0+1	0
26	DF	(Romania) ROU	Toader	1	0	0+1	0	0	0		
27	DF	(Democratic Republic of the Congo) COD	Sivis	36	2	29+2	2	2+2	0	1	0
29	FW	(Spain) ESP	Soro	31	4	21+5	4	3+2	0		
30	DF	(Romania) ROU	Duțu	12	0	4+4	0	0+3	0	0+1	0
32	DF	(Democratic Republic of the Congo) COD	Ikoko	25	0	10+11	0	2+1	0	0+1	0
47	FW	(Romania) ROU	Puşcaş	8	1	4+3	1	1	0		
55	DF	(Romania) ROU	Țicu	9	0	0+6	0	0+2	0	0+1	0
73	GK	(Romania) ROU	Roșca	15	0	11	0	4	0		
77	FW	(Scotland) SCO	Armstrong	42	6	31+7	6	2+1	0	1	0
90	MF	(Romania) ROU	Mărginean	28	0	20+3	0	2+2	0	1	0
99	FW	(Romania) ROU	Pop	41	5	15+21	4	4+1	1		
Players sold, released or loaned out during the season:
5	DF	(Romania) ROU	Pașcalău	1	0	0+1	0	0	0		
18	FW	(Croatia) CRO	Perica	18	2	2+14	2	0+2	0		
19	FW	(Madagascar) MAD	Abdallah	1	0	0+1	0	0	0		
23	MF	(Cyprus) CYP	Kyriakou	21	0	9+10	0	2	0		
48	FW	(Romania) ROU	Bărbulescu	2	0	0+1	0	0+1	0		

== Transfers ==
=== Transfers in ===
Date	Position	Nationality	Name	From	Fee	Ref.
1 July 2025	DM	(Romania)	Cristian Mihai	UTA Arad	€400,000	
1 July 2025	ST	(Romania)	Luca Bărbulescu	Free Agent	Free	
1 July 2025	LB	(Romania)	Raul Opruț	(Belgium) KV Kortrijk	€200,000	
1 July 2025	CM	(Romania)	Andrei Mărginean	(Italy) Sassuolo Calcio	€350,000	
1 July 2025	GK	(Romania)	Codruț Sandu	Rapid București	Free	
1 July 2025	LW	(Romania)	Alexandru Musi	FCSB	Free	
1 July 2025	DM	(Cyprus)	Charalampos Kyriakou	(Cyprus) Apollon Limassol	Free	
1 July 2025	RW	(Scotland)	Daniel Armstrong	(Scotland) Kilmarnock FC	Free	
1 July 2025	ST	(Ukraine)	Vadym Kyrychenko	UTA Arad	Free	
1 July 2025	GK	(Romania)	Yanis Găgeatu	Universitatea Craiova	Undisclosed	
7 July 2025	CB	(Israel)	Nikita Stoinov	(Israel) Maccabi Netanya	€450,000	
7 July 2025	LW	(France)	Mamoudou Karamoko	(Denmark) FC Copenhagen	Undisclosed	
9 July 2025	RB	(Democratic Republic of the Congo)	Jordan Ikoko	(Cyprus) Omonia 29M	Free	
9 July 2025	GK	(Cameroon)	Devis Epassy	(Cyprus) Karmiotissa FC	Undisclosed	
11 July 2025	RB	(Moldova)	Alexandru Tabuncic	Voința Crevedia	Undisclosed	
31 August 2025	RW	(Romania)	Adrian Mazilu	(England) Brighton & Hove Albion FC	€450,000	
5 September 2025	RB	(Romania)	Matei Marin	Steaua București	Free	
2 January 2026	LB	(Romania)	Valentin Țicu	Petrolul Ploiești	Free	
16 January 2026	RW	(Romania)	Ianis Tarbă	(Spain) RC Celta de Vigo	Undisclosed	
23 January 2026	CB	(Romania)	Matteo Duțu	(Italy) AC Milan	Undisclosed	
24 February 2026	ST	(Romania)	George Puşcaş	Free Agent	Free	

=== Loans in ===
Date from	Position	Nationality	Name	From	Date until	Ref.

=== Transfers out ===
Date	Position	Nationality	Name	To	Fee	Ref.
30 June 2025	CB	(Romania)	Răzvan Patriche	Retired	End of contract	
30 June 2025	ST	(Kosovo)	Astrit Selmani	(China) Shaanxi Union	End of contract	
30 June 2025	CB	(Togo)	Josué Homawoo	(Belgium) Standard Liège	End of contract	
30 June 2025	LB	(Spain)	Antonio Luna	(Spain) Antequera CF	End of contract	
30 June 2025	LW	(Moldova)	Petru Neagu	(Moldova) FC Bălți	End of contract	
30 June 2025	LW	(Romania)	Dennis Politic	FCSB	€970,000 + A. Musi	
30 June 2025	GK	(Slovenia)	Adnan Golubović	(Kosovo) FC Ballkani	Released	
30 June 2025	AM	(Denmark)	Patrick Olsen	(Denmark) AC Horsens	€400,000	
30 June 2025	RB	(Romania)	Cristian Costin	(Azerbaijan) Neftçi PFK	Released	
18 July 2025	ST	(Madagascar)	Hakim Abdallah	UTA Arad	Released	
3 August 2025	CM	(Romania)	Antonio Cristea	Voința Crevedia	Free	
9 August 2025	LB	(Romania)	Alexandru Serafim	Dunărea Călăraşi	Free	
9 September 2025	GK	(Romania)	Alexandru Stoian	1599 Șelimbăr	Free	
15 January 2026	CM	(Cyprus)	Charalampos Kyriakou	(Cyprus) AEK Larnaca	Released	
6 February 2026	ST	(Croatia)	Stipe Perica	(Uzbekistan) Neftchi Fergana	Released	
7 February 2026	GK	(Romania)	Yanis Găgeatu	Recolta Gheorghe Doja	Free	

=== Loans out ===
Date from	Position	Nationality	Name	To	Date until	Ref.
1 July 2025	LB	(Romania)	Costin Amzăr	(United Arab Emirates) Al-Nasr SC	30 June 2026	
1 July 2025	RB	(Romania)	David Irimia	Metaloglobus București	30 June 2026	
1 July 2025	CM	(Romania)	Alexandru Irimia	Metaloglobus București	30 June 2026	
1 July 2025	ST	(Romania)	Valentin Dumitrache	Metalul Buzău	30 June 2026	
11 July 2025	ST	(Romania)	Raul Rotund	Unirea Slobozia	31 December 2025	
11 July 2025	AM	(Romania)	Darius Gavrilă	CS Tunari	5 February 2026	
21 July 2025	GK	(Romania)	Codruț Sandu	Corvinul Hunedoara	30 June 2026	
30 July 2025	RB	(Romania)	Ianys Neculai	CS Dinamo București	30 June 2026	
30 July 2025	LW	(Romania)	Andrei Ionică	CS Dinamo București	8 September 2025	
30 July 2025	ST	(Ukraine)	Vadym Kyrychenko	CS Dinamo București	20 January 2026	
1 August 2025	AM	(Nigeria)	Peter Maapia	Gloria Bistrița	30 June 2026	
9 August 2025	RW	(Nigeria)	Hussaini Sanusi	Minaur Baia Mare	30 June 2026	
5 September 2025	RB	(Romania)	Matei Marin	Olimpia Satu Mare	30 June 2026	
8 September 2025	CB	(Romania)	Răzvan Pașcalău	CS Dinamo București	30 June 2026	
9 September 2025	GK	(Romania)	Yanis Găgeatu	Recolta Gheorghe Doja	5 February 2026	
9 September 2025	RW	(Nigeria)	Ahmed Bala	Înainte Modelu	30 June 2026	
9 September 2025	LW	(Romania)	Andrei Ionică	LPS HD Clinceni	30 June 2026	
8 January 2026	ST	(Romania)	Raul Rotund	ASA Târgu Mureș	30 June 2026	
16 January 2026	ST	(Romania)	Luca Bărbulescu	Corvinul Hunedoara	30 June 2026	
21 January 2026	CM	(Romania)	Casian Soare	CS Dinamo București	30 June 2026	
5 February 2026	GK	(Romania)	Costin Ungureanu	Vulturii Fărcășești	30 June 2026	
