= 2024–25 FC Dinamo București season =

Dinamo București
2024–25 season
- Chairman: Andrei Nicolescu
- Head coach: Željko Kopić
- Stadium: Arena Națională & Arcul de Triumf
- Liga 1: 6th
- Cupa României: Group stage
- Top goalscorer: League: Astrit Selmani (14); All: Astrit Selmani (14)
- Average home league attendance: 10,945
Home colours	Away colours	Third colours

The 2024–25 season was the 76th year in their history of Dinamo București and their second season back in the Liga I since the 2021–22 season following their promotion from the Liga II. The club also competed in the Cupa României.

== Squad at the end of the season ==
Updated last, 10 February 2025

No.	Name	Nationality	Position	Date of birth (age)	Signed from	Signed in	Contract end
Goalkeepers
1	Adnan Golubović	(Slovenia)	GK	22 July 1995 (aged 29)	(Slovenia) FC Koper	1 July 2023	30 June 2026
16	Alexandru Stoian	(Romania)	GK	12 March 2005 (aged 20)	Academy	1 January 2021	30 June 2027
73	Alexandru Roșca	(Romania)	GK	12 November 2003 (aged 21)	1599 Șelimbăr	1 July 2024	30 June 2029
Defenders
3	Raul Opruț	(Romania)	LB	4 January 1998 (aged 27)	(Belgium) KV Kortrijk	1 July 2024	30 June 2025
4	Kennedy Boateng	(Togo)	CB	29 November 1996 (aged 28)	Austria Lustenau	1 July 2024	30 June 2026
5	Răzvan Pașcalău	(Romania)	CB	5 May 2004 (aged 21)	(Italy) US Lecce	1 July 2024	30 June 2029
23	Răzvan Patriche (C)	(Romania)	CB	29 April 1986 (aged 39)	Academica Clinceni	4 January 2022	30 June 2025
27	Maxime Sivis	(Democratic Republic of the Congo)	RB	1 April 1998 (aged 27)	(France) EA Guingamp	17 July 2024	30 June 2027
28	Josué Homawoo	(Togo)	CB	12 November 1997 (aged 27)	(France) Red Star FC	16 July 2023	30 June 2025
80	Antonio Luna	(Spain)	LB	17 March 1991 (aged 34)	Free Agent	14 October 2024	30 June 2025
98	Cristian Costin	(Romania)	RB	17 June 1998 (aged 27)	FC Voluntari	3 July 2023	30 June 2026
Midfielders
6	Cristian Licsandru	(Romania)	CM	27 March 2003 (aged 22)	Free Agent	15 April 2024	Unknown
8	Eddy Gnahoré (VC)	(France)	CM	14 November 1993 (aged 31)	(Italy) Ascoli Calcio	17 January 2024	30 June 2026
10	Cătălin Cîrjan (VC)	(Romania)	CM	1 December 2002 (aged 22)	(England) Arsenal FC	1 July 2024	30 June 2027
17	Georgi Milanov	(Bulgaria)	AM	19 February 1992 (aged 33)	Free Agent	19 January 2024	30 June 2025
22	Casian Soare	(Romania)	CM	24 November 2006 (aged 18)	1599 Șelimbăr	20 January 2025	30 June 2028
32	Antonio Cristea	(Romania)	CM	23 June 2008 (aged 17)	Academy	17 January 2025	Unknown
33	Patrick Olsen	(Denmark)	AM	23 April 1994 (aged 31)	(Poland) Śląsk Wrocław	4 September 2024	30 June 2026
34	Eduard Ilincaș	(Romania)	CM	31 July 2009 (aged 15)	Academy	17 January 2025	Unknown
90	Andrei Mărginean	(Romania)	CM	3 July 2001 (aged 23)	(Italy) Sassuolo Calcio	18 July 2024	30 June 2025
Forwards
7	Dennis Politic (VC)	(Romania)	LW	5 March 2000 (aged 25)	(Italy) US Cremonese	3 July 2023	30 June 2027
9	Astrit Selmani	(Kosovo)	ST	13 May 1997 (aged 28)	(Israel) Hapoel Be'er Sheva	10 February 2024	30 June 2025
18	Stipe Perica	(Croatia)	ST	7 July 1995 (aged 29)	(Croatia) HNK Rijeka	2 February 2025	30 June 2027
19	Hakim Abdallah	(Madagascar)	ST	9 January 1998 (aged 27)	(Belgium) RE Virton	1 July 2023	30 June 2026
24	Adrian Caragea	(Romania)	LW	7 September 2005 (aged 19)	(Italy) Sassuolo Calcio	1 July 2024	30 June 2028
30	Raul Rotund	(Romania)	ST	17 November 2005 (aged 19)	Universitatea Cluj	1 July 2024	30 June 2028
99	Alexandru Pop	(Romania)	ST	1 February 2000 (aged 25)	Oțelul Galați	1 January 2025	30 June 2027
Out on Loan
15	David Irimia	(Romania)	RB	12 May 2006 (aged 19)	Academy	27 February 2023	30 June 2029
18	Alberto Soro	(Spain)	RW	9 March 1999 (aged 26)	(Spain) Granada CF	7 August 2024	30 June 2027
20	Antonio Bordușanu	(Romania)	RW	10 August 2004 (aged 20)	Academy	6 February 2021	30 June 2027
21	Petru Neagu	(Moldova)	LW	13 August 1999 (aged 25)	(Moldova) CSF Bălți	17 January 2024	30 June 2025
29	Alexandru Irimia	(Romania)	CM	12 May 2006 (aged 19)	Academy	27 February 2023	30 June 2029
31	Costin Amzăr	(Romania)	LB	11 July 2003 (aged 21)	Academy	1 September 2020	30 June 2027
-	Denis Oncescu	(Romania)	GK	15 August 2004 (aged 20)	Academy	16 April 2021	30 June 2028
-	Alexandru Serafim	(Romania)	LB	27 October 2005 (aged 19)	Academy	1 January 2024	Unknown
-	Darius Gavrilă	(Romania)	AM	5 January 2007 (aged 18)	Academy	1 July 2024	Unknown
-	Peter Maapia	(Nigeria)	AM	6 January 2006 (aged 19)	(Nigeria) Academy Ikon Allah	6 September 2024	30 June 2028
-	Ahmed Bala	(Nigeria)	RW	18 May 2005 (aged 20)	(Nigeria) Academy Ikon Allah	3 September 2024	30 June 2028
-	Hussaini Sanusi	(Nigeria)	RW	6 June 2006 (aged 19)	(Nigeria) Academy Ikon Allah	6 September 2024	30 June 2028
-	Godwin Udosen	(Nigeria)	RW	3 March 2008 (aged 17)	(Nigeria) Blessed Stars Academy	24 August 2024	Unknown
-	Andrei Ionică	(Romania)	LW	2 March 2005 (aged 20)	Unirea Bascov	18 July 2024	30 June 2028
-	Valentin Dumitrache	(Romania)	ST	29 March 2003 (aged 22)	Farul Constanța	6 August 2024	30 June 2027

== Pre-season and friendlies ==
15 June 2024 Friendly	Olimpic Zărnești	0 – 8	Dinamo București	Zărneşti
17:00 EEST (UTC+3)			Giafer 26'; Cîrjan 32'; Florescu 50', 55', 64'; Caragea 71'; Borcea 75'; Licsandru 83'	Stadium: Celuloza

22 June 2024 Friendly	Dinamo București	1 – 1	Unirea Slobozia	Ghimbav
11:00 EEST (UTC+3)	Selmani 78' (pen.)		? 56'	Stadium: Campo Verde

29 June 2024 Friendly	(Slovenia) NK Domžale	3 – 4	Dinamo București	Rogaška Slatina
18:30 EEST (UTC+3)	? 3' ? 80' ? 107'		Cîrjan 21'; Abdallah 53', 85', 109'	Stadium: Sports Centre

5 July 2024 Friendly	(Slovenia) NK Bistrica	1 – 2	Dinamo București	Rogaška Slatina
18:30 EEST (UTC+3)	? 72'		Caragea 24'; Cîrjan 76'	Stadium: Sports Centre

6 July 2024 Friendly	Dinamo București	0 – 2	(Ukraine) Kryvbas Kryvyi Rih	Krapina
18:30 EEST (UTC+3)			? 9' ? 84'	Stadium: SRC Podgora

8 August 2024 Friendly	Dinamo București	3 – 3	Petrolul Ploiești	Balotești
18:30 EEST (UTC+3)	Sivis 22'; Selmani 37' (pen.); Caragea 50'		? 1' ? 18' ? 81'	Stadium: Baza Săftica

8 September 2024 Friendly	Dinamo București	0 – 1	CS Afumați	Balotești
11:00 EEST (UTC+3)			? (?)	Stadium: Baza Săftica

12 October 2024 Friendly	Dinamo București	3 – 3	Metaloglobus București	Balotești
11:00 EEST (UTC+3)	Selmani (?) ? (?); Neagu (?)		? (?) ? (?) ? (?)	Stadium: Baza Săftica

16 November 2024 Friendly	Dinamo București	4 – 1	Concordia Chiajna	Balotești
11:00 EEST (UTC+3)	Bordușanu 52'; Caragea 56'; Neagu 70'; Olsen 84'		? (?)	Stadium: Baza Săftica

8 January 2025 Friendly	Dinamo București	1 – 3	(Switzerland) FC Zürich	Antalya
15:00 EEST (UTC+3)	Politic 17'		? 45' ? 77' ? 87'	Stadium: Asteria Kremlin Palace

13 January 2025 Friendly	Dinamo București	1 – 1	(Serbia) FK Novi Pazar	Antalya
17:00 EEST (UTC+3)	Bordușanu 80'		? 28'	Stadium: Mardan Sports Complex

22 March 2025 Friendly	Dinamo București	1 – 2	CS Afumați	Balotești
11:00 EEST (UTC+3)	Pop (?)		? (?) ? (?)	Stadium: Baza Săftica

== Competitions ==
=== Liga I ===
==== Regular season ====
===== League table =====
Pos	Team	Pld	W	D	L	GF	GA	GD	Pts	Advances
3	Universitatea Craiova	30	14	10	6	45	28	+17	52 (Note: Ranked on head-to-head points: Universitatea Craiova (4); Universitatea Cluj (1).)	Qualification for play-off round
4	Universitatea Cluj	30	14	10	6	43	27	+16	52	Qualification for play-off round
5	Dinamo București	30	13	12	5	41	26	+15	51	Qualification for play-off round
6	Rapid București	30	11	13	6	35	26	+9	46	Qualification for play-off round
7	Sepsi OSK	30	11	8	11	38	35	+3	41 (Note: Ranked on head-to-head goal difference: Sepsi (+3); Hermannstadt (-3).)	Qualification for play-out round

Source: LPF (in Romanian)
Rules for classification: 1) Points; 2) Head-to-head points; 3) Head-to-head goal difference; 4) Head-to-head goals scored; 5) Goal difference; 6) Goals scored; 7) Play-off.

=== Matches ===
14 July 2024 1	CFR Cluj	3 – 2	Dinamo București	Cluj-Napoca
19:00 EEST (UTC+3)	? 42' (pen.) ? 52' ? 90+3'		Cîrjan 14'; Abdallah 34'	Stadium: Dr. Constantin Rădulescu; Referee: Rareş Vidican

21 July 2024 2	Dinamo București	4 – 1	Petrolul Ploiești	București
22:00 EEST (UTC+3)	Abdallah 12'; Cîrjan 42'; Selmani 61'; Politic 86' (pen.)		? 82'	Stadium: Arcul de Triumf; Referee: George Găman

27 July 2024 3	Sepsi Sfântu Gheorghe	1 – 1	Dinamo București	Sfântu Gheorghe
22:00 EEST (UTC+3)	? 29'		Neagu 74'	Stadium: Sepsi Arena; Referee: Horațiu Feșnic

3 August 2024 4	Dinamo București	4 – 1	Gloria Buzău	București
18:00 EEST (UTC+3)	Politic 11', 84'; Opruț 27'; Selmani 80'		Boateng 54' (o.g.)	Stadium: Arcul de Triumf; Referee: Szabolcs Kovacs

12 August 2024 5	Politehnica Iași	2 – 2	Dinamo București	Iași
22:00 EEST (UTC+3)	? 13' ? 45+4'		Selmani 3' (pen.); Todoroski 57' (o.g.)	Stadium: Emil Alexandrescu; Referee: Sebastian Colțescu

18 August 2024 6	Rapid București	1 – 1	Dinamo București	București
21:30 EEST (UTC+3)	? 53' (pen.)		Selmani 79' (pen.)	Stadium: Rapid-Giulești; Referee: Iulian Călin

24 August 2024 7	Dinamo București	2 – 1	Universitatea Craiova	București
22:00 EEST (UTC+3)	Bani 1'; Gnahoré 42'		? 44'	Stadium: Arcul de Triumf; Referee: Marian Barbu

2 September 2024 8	Universitatea Cluj	1 – 0	Dinamo București	Cluj-Napoca
21:30 EEST (UTC+3)	Bic 62'			Stadium: Cluj Arena; Referee: Marcel Bîrsan

13 September 2024 9	Dinamo București	1 – 0	Unirea Slobozia	București
21:00 EEST (UTC+3)	Cîrjan 32'			Stadium: Arcul de Triumf; Referee: Andrei Moroiță

20 September 2024 10	Oțelul Galați	1 – 1	Dinamo București	Galați
21:00 EEST (UTC+3)	? 23'		Selmani 18' (pen.)	Stadium: Oțelul; Referee: Viorel Flueran

27 September 2024 11	Dinamo București	2 – 2	FC Botoșani	București
21:00 EEST (UTC+3)	Selmani 28'; Politic 70'		? 76' ? 85' (pen.)	Stadium: Arcul de Triumf; Referee: Sorin Vădana

4 October 2024 12	Farul Constanța	1 – 1	Dinamo București	Ovidiu
21:00 EEST (UTC+3)	? 71'		Cîrjan 4'	Stadium: Central; Referee: Adrian Cojocaru

20 October 2024 13	Dinamo București	0 – 2	FCSB	București
21:00 EEST (UTC+3)			? 27' ? 90+3'	Stadium: Arena Națională; Referee: Marian Barbu

26 October 2024 14	FC Hermannstadt	0 – 2	Dinamo București	Sibiu
19:00 EEST (UTC+3)			Selmani 32' (pen.); Boateng 88'	Stadium: Municipal; Referee: Rareş Vidican

2 November 2024 15	Dinamo București	1 – 0	UTA Arad	București
21:00 EEST (UTC+3)	Politic 26'			Stadium: Arcul de Triumf; Referee: George Găman

8 November 2024 16	Dinamo București	1 – 1	CFR Cluj	București
21:00 EEST (UTC+3)	Homawoo 33'		? 45+2'	Stadium: Arcul de Triumf; Referee: Adrian Cojocaru

24 November 2024 17	Petrolul Ploiești	0 – 1	Dinamo București	Ploiești
20:45 EEST (UTC+3)			Selmani 31'	Stadium: Ilie Oană; Referee: Horațiu Feşnic

30 November 2024 18	Dinamo București	1 – 1	Sepsi Sfântu Gheorghe	București
20:30 EEST (UTC+3)	Niňaj 38' (o.g.)		? 90+9' (pen.)	Stadium: Arcul de Triumf; Referee: Szabolcs Kovacs

7 December 2024 19	Gloria Buzău	0 – 1	Dinamo București	Buzău
21:00 EEST (UTC+3)			Selmani 52'	Stadium: Municipal; Referee: Sebastian Colțescu

13 December 2024 20	Dinamo București	2 – 0	Politehnica Iași	București
20:00 EEST (UTC+3)	Politic 73'; Olsen 90+3'			Stadium: Arcul de Triumf; Referee: Horațiu Feşnic

22 December 2024 21	Dinamo București	0 – 0	Rapid București	București
20:00 EEST (UTC+3)				Stadium: Arena Națională; Referee: Marian Barbu

19 January 2025 22	Universitatea Craiova	1 – 1	Dinamo București	Craiova
20:30 EEST (UTC+3)	? 36' (pen.)		Boateng 48'	Stadium: Ion Oblemenco; Referee: Szabolcs Kovacs

24 January 2025 23	Dinamo București	0 – 0	Universitatea Cluj	București
20:00 EEST (UTC+3)				Stadium: Arcul de Triumf; Referee: Florin Andrei

31 January 2025 24	Unirea Slobozia	1 – 3	Dinamo București	Clinceni
20:00 EEST (UTC+3)	? 42'		Abdallah 35', 82'; Selmani 90+3' (pen.)	Stadium: Clinceni; Referee: Florin Chivulete

4 February 2025 25	Dinamo București	1 – 0	Oțelul Galați	București
20:30 EEST (UTC+3)	Selmani 90+8' (pen.)			Stadium: Arcul de Triumf; Referee: Andrei Moroiță

7 February 2025 26	FC Botoșani	1 – 1	Dinamo București	Botoșani
20:00 EEST (UTC+3)	? 12'		Cîrjan 45'	Stadium: Municipal; Referee: Marcel Bîrsan

15 February 2025 27	Dinamo București	0 – 2	Farul Constanța	București
20:00 EEST (UTC+3)			? 24' ? 59'	Stadium: Arcul de Triumf; Referee: George Găman

23 February 2025 28	FCSB	2 – 1	Dinamo București	București
20:00 EEST (UTC+3)	? 20' ? 57'		Perica 18'	Stadium: Arena Națională; Referee: Istvan Kovacs

3 March 2025 29	Dinamo București	2 – 0	FC Hermannstadt	București
20:00 EEST (UTC+3)	Gnahoré 47'; Cîrjan 65'			Stadium: Arcul de Triumf; Referee: Horațiu Feșnic

8 March 2025 30	UTA Arad	0 – 2	Dinamo București	Arad
18:00 EEST (UTC+3)			Cîrjan 45+1'; Selmani 87'	Stadium: Francisc von Neuman; Referee: Adrian Cojocaru

==== Play-off round ====
===== Play-off table =====
Pos	Team	Pld	W	D	L	GF	GA	GD	Pts	Qualification
1	FCSB (C)	10	7	3	0	18	9	+9	52	Qualification for Champions League first qualifying round
2	CFR Cluj	10	4	4	2	17	11	+6	43	Qualification for Europa League first qualifying round (Note: The winner of the 2024–25 Cupa României (CFR Cluj) qualifies for the Europa League first qualifying round.)
3	Universitatea Craiova	10	4	2	4	13	11	+2	40	Qualification for Conference League second qualifying round
4	Universitatea Cluj	10	4	1	5	12	15	−3	39	Qualification for Conference League second qualifying round
5	Rapid București	10	2	4	4	12	17	−5	33	
6	Dinamo București	10	1	2	7	10	19	−9	31	

Source: Soccerway, FRF (in Romanian), LPF (in Romanian)
Rules for classification: 1) Points; 2) Points without rounding; 3) Points in the regular season; 4) Head-to-head points; 5) Head-to-head goal difference; 6) Head-to-head goals scored; 7) Goal difference; 8) Goals scored; 9) Play-off (only if needed to decide champion or teams for UEFA competitions). (Note: only criteria 7 and 8 are applied to establish the classification during the competition.) Source:
(C) Champions

=== Matches ===
15 March 2025 1	CFR Cluj	3 – 1	Dinamo București	Cluj-Napoca
21:00 EEST (UTC+3)	? 14' ? 44' ? 80' (pen.)		Perica 68'	Stadium: Dr. Constantin Rădulescu; Referee: Sebastian Colțescu

30 March 2025 2	Dinamo București	1 – 2	FCSB	București
20:30 EEST (UTC+3)	Perica 24'		? 44' ? 85'	Stadium: Arena Națională; Referee: Florin Andrei

6 April 2025 3	Rapid București	1 – 0	Dinamo București	București
21:00 EEST (UTC+3)	? 32'			Stadium: Rapid-Giulești; Referee: Rareş Vidican

12 April 2025 4	Universitatea Cluj	2 – 4	Dinamo București	Cluj-Napoca
20:00 EEST (UTC+3)	? 14' ? 44'		Perica 25', 32'; Selmani 45+2'; Simion 58' (o.g.)	Stadium: Cluj Arena; Referee: Marian Barbu

21 April 2025 5	Dinamo București	0 – 2	Universitatea Craiova	București
21:00 EEST (UTC+3)			? 53' ? 62'	Stadium: Arena Națională; Referee: Marcel Bîrsan

28 April 2025 6	Dinamo București	1 – 1	CFR Cluj	București
21:00 EEST (UTC+3)	Mărginean 85'		? 64'	Stadium: Arena Națională; Referee: Andrei Moroiță

5 May 2025 7	FCSB	3 – 1	Dinamo București	București
20:30 EEST (UTC+3)	? 23' ? 26', 36'		Selmani 56' (pen.)	Stadium: Arena Națională; Referee: Rareş Vidican

12 May 2025 8	Dinamo București	0 – 0	Rapid București	București
21:00 EEST (UTC+3)				Stadium: Arena Națională; Referee: Marcel Bîrsan

16 May 2025 9	Dinamo București	1 – 3	Universitatea Cluj	București
21:00 EEST (UTC+3)	Perica 35'		? 84' ? 90+1' ? 90+4'	Stadium: Arena Națională; Referee: Istvan Kovacs

24 May 2025 10	Universitatea Craiova	2 – 1	Dinamo București	Craiova
21:00 EEST (UTC+3)	? 46' ? 61'		Mărginean 12'	Stadium: Ion Oblemenco; Referee: Horațiu Feșnic

=== Cupa României ===
==== Play-off round ====
28 August 2024 Play-off round	FC Voluntari	0 – 1	Dinamo București	Voluntari
19:00 EEST (UTC+3)			Cîrjan 24'	Stadium: Anghel Iordănescu; Referee: Vlad Băban

==== Group stage ====
Pos	Team	Pld	W	D	L	GF	GA	GD	Pts	Qualification	MET	UCV	FCS	PET	DIN	AGR
1	Metalul Buzău	3	2	1	0	4	0	+4	7	Advance to knockout phase	—	1–0	—	—	0–0	—
2	Universitatea Craiova	3	2	0	1	4	1	+3	6	Advance to knockout phase	—	—	—	—	—	—
3	FCSB	3	2	0	1	6	3	+3	6		—	0–2	—	—	—	—
4	Petrolul Ploiești	3	1	1	1	3	2	+1	4		—	0–2	—	—	—	—
5	Dinamo București	3	0	2	1	0	4	−4	2		—	—	0–4	0–0	—	—
6	Agricola Borcea	3	0	0	3	1	8	−7	0		0–3	—	1–2	0–3	—	—

Source: FRF

30 October 2024 Group stage	Dinamo București	0 – 4	FCSB	București
21:00 EEST (UTC+3)			? 55' ? 70' ? 81', 88'	Stadium: Arena Națională; Referee: Radu Petrescu

4 December 2024 Group stage	Metalul Buzău	0 – 0	Dinamo București	Buzău
17:45 EEST (UTC+3)				Stadium: Municipal; Referee: Viorel Flueran

18 December 2024 Group stage	Dinamo București	0 – 0	Petrolul Ploiești	București
21:00 EEST (UTC+3)				Stadium: Arcul de Triumf; Referee: Marcel Bîrsan

== Statistics ==
=== Appearances and goals ===
Players with no appearances are not included on the list.

As of match played 24 May 2025

No.	Pos	Nat	Player	Total		Liga I		Cupa României	
No.	Pos	Nat	Player	Apps	Goals	Apps	Goals	Apps	Goals
1	GK	(Slovenia) SVN	Golubović	21	0	19	0	2	0
3	DF	(Romania) ROU	Opruț	38	1	34+1	1	3	0
4	DF	(Togo) TOG	Boateng	31	2	29	2	2	0
5	DF	(Romania) ROU	Pașcalău	2	0	0+1	0	1	0
6	MF	(Romania) ROU	Licsandru	11	0	4+5	0	2	0
7	FW	(Romania) ROU	Politic	27	6	19+7	6	1	0
8	MF	(France) FRA	Gnahoré	36	2	33	2	2+1	0
9	FW	(Kosovo) KOS	Selmani	39	14	36	14	2+1	0
10	MF	(Romania) ROU	Cîrjan	42	8	39	7	2+1	1
17	MF	(Bulgaria) BUL	Milanov	40	0	35+4	0	1	0
18	FW	(Croatia) CRO	Perica	16	6	13+3	6	0	0
19	FW	(Madagascar) MAD	Abdallah	35	4	15+16	4	3+1	0
22	MF	(Romania) ROU	Soare	2	0	0+2	0	0	0
23	DF	(Romania) ROU	Patriche	25	0	10+11	0	4	0
24	FW	(Romania) ROU	Caragea	17	0	0+14	0	2+1	0
27	DF	(Democratic Republic of the Congo) COD	Sivis	35	0	31+2	0	1+1	0
28	DF	(Togo) TOG	Homawoo	31	1	27+3	1	0+1	0
30	FW	(Romania) ROU	Rotund	4	0	0+3	0	0+1	0
33	MF	(Denmark) DEN	Olsen	29	1	28	1	1	0
73	GK	(Romania) ROU	Roșca	24	0	21+1	0	2	0
80	DF	(Spain) ESP	Luna	15	0	4+9	0	1+1	0
90	MF	(Romania) ROU	Mărginean	33	2	12+17	2	2+2	0
98	DF	(Romania) ROU	Costin	37	0	12+21	0	3+1	0
99	FW	(Romania) ROU	Pop	17	0	8+9	0	0	0
Players sold, released or loaned out during the season:
18	FW	(Spain) ESP	Soro	9	0	2+4	0	2+1	0
20	FW	(Romania) ROU	Bordușanu	11	0	2+6	0	2+1	0
21	FW	(Moldova) MDA	Neagu	7	1	0+5	1	1+1	0
22	MF	(Romania) ROU	Bani	16	1	5+7	1	3+1	0
29	MF	(Romania) ROU	Irimia	1	0	0+1	0	0	0
31	DF	(Romania) ROU	Amzăr	5	0	2+3	0	0	0
77	FW	(Romania) ROU	Florescu	1	0	0	0	0+1	0

=== Disciplinary record ===
Includes all competitive matches. The list is sorted by squad number when total cards are equal. Players with no cards not included in the list.

As of match played 12 May 2024

== Transfers ==
=== Transfers in ===
Date	Position	Nationality	Name	From	Fee	Ref.
1 July 2024	CM	(Romania)	Cătălin Cîrjan	(England) Arsenal FC	Free	
1 July 2024	LW	(Romania)	Adrian Caragea	(Italy) Sassuolo Calcio	Undisclosed	
1 July 2024	GK	(Romania)	Alexandru Roșca	1599 Șelimbăr	€100,000	
1 July 2024	CB	(Togo)	Kennedy Boateng	Austria Lustenau	Free	
1 July 2024	CB	(Romania)	Răzvan Pașcalău	(Italy) US Lecce	Undisclosed	
1 July 2024	ST	(Romania)	Raul Rotund	Universitatea Cluj	Free	
17 July 2024	RB	(Democratic Republic of the Congo)	Maxime Sivis	(France) EA Guingamp	Free	
18 July 2024	LW	(Romania)	Andrei Ionică	Unirea Bascov	Free	
6 August 2024	ST	(Romania)	Valentin Dumitrache	Farul Constanța	Undisclosed	
7 August 2024	RW	(Spain)	Alberto Soro	(Spain) Granada CF	Free	
24 August 2024	RW	(Nigeria)	Godwin Udosen	(Nigeria) Blessed Stars Academy	Undisclosed	
3 September 2024	RW	(Nigeria)	Ahmed Bala	(Nigeria) Academy Ikon Allah	Undisclosed	
4 September 2024	AM	(Denmark)	Patrick Olsen	(Poland) Śląsk Wrocław	Undisclosed	
6 September 2024	RW	(Nigeria)	Hussaini Sanusi	(Nigeria) Academy Ikon Allah	Undisclosed	
6 September 2024	AM	(Nigeria)	Peter Maapia	(Nigeria) Academy Ikon Allah	Undisclosed	
14 October 2024	LB	(Spain)	Antonio Luna	Free Agent	Free	
1 January 2025	ST	(Romania)	Alexandru Pop	Oțelul Galați	€125,000	
20 January 2025	CM	(Romania)	Casian Soare	1599 Șelimbăr	Undisclosed	
2 February 2025	ST	(Croatia)	Stipe Perica	(Croatia) HNK Rijeka	Free	

=== Loans in ===
Date from	Position	Nationality	Name	From	Date until	Ref.
1 July 2024	LB	(Romania)	Raul Opruț	(Belgium) KV Kortrijk	30 June 2025	
18 July 2024	CM	(Romania)	Andrei Mărginean	(Italy) Sassuolo Calcio	30 June 2025	

=== Transfers out ===
Date	Position	Nationality	Name	To	Fee	Ref.
30 June 2024	RB	(Brazil)	Gabriel Moura	Free Agent	End of contract	
30 June 2024	CB	(Romania)	Ricardo Grigore	(Spain) CD Eldense	End of contract	
30 June 2024	CB	(Guinea-Bissau)	Edgar Ié	Free Agent	End of contract	
30 June 2024	CB	(North Macedonia)	Darko Velkovski	Free Agent	End of contract	
30 June 2024	CM	(Spain)	Daniel Iglesias	Steaua București	Released	
30 June 2024	CM	(Croatia)	Christian Ilić	(Bulgaria) Spartak Varna	Released	
30 June 2024	CM	(Romania)	Neluț Roșu	Oțelul Galați	Released	
30 June 2024	ST	(Portugal)	Gonçalo Gregório	(Armenia) FC Noah	Released	
30 June 2024	GK	(Moldova)	Dorian Railean	Gloria Buzău	Released	
30 June 2024	ST	(Romania)	Vlăduț Stanciu	Unirea Alba Iulia	Undisclosed	
30 June 2024	AM	(Romania)	Valentin Borcea	UTA Arad	Released	
2 July 2024	CB	(France)	Quentin Bena	(Lithuania) Kauno Žalgiris	Released	
5 July 2024	CB	(Romania)	Deniz Giafer	Bihor Oradea	Released	
19 July 2024	RW	(Romania)	Cristian Ionescu	CS Blejoi	Released	
27 August 2024	GK	(Romania)	Răzvan Began	Gloria Bistrița	Undisclosed	
3 January 2025	LW	(Romania)	Andrei Florescu	CSM Reșița	Released	
11 January 2025	AM	(Romania)	Andrei Bani	Oțelul Galați	Undisclosed	

=== Loans out ===
Date from	Position	Nationality	Name	To	Date until	Ref.
1 July 2024	GK	(Romania)	Denis Oncescu	Argeș Pitești	30 June 2025	
8 July 2024	RB	(Romania)	David Irimia	Metaloglobus București	30 June 2025	
18 July 2024	LW	(Romania)	Andrei Ionică	CS Afumați	30 June 2025	
19 July 2024	LB	(Romania)	Alexandru Serafim	SCM Râmnicu Vâlcea	30 June 2025	
19 July 2024	AM	(Romania)	Darius Gavrilă	CS Tunari	30 June 2025	
6 August 2024	ST	(Romania)	Valentin Dumitrache	CS Afumați	30 June 2025	
24 August 2024	RW	(Nigeria)	Godwin Udosen	CS Afumați	30 June 2025	
3 September 2024	RW	(Nigeria)	Ahmed Bala	CS Tunari	30 June 2025	
4 September 2024	CM	(Romania)	Alexandru Irimia	Metaloglobus București	30 June 2025	
6 September 2024	RW	(Nigeria)	Hussaini Sanusi	AFC Câmpulung Muscel	31 December 2024	
6 September 2024	AM	(Nigeria)	Peter Maapia	AFC Câmpulung Muscel	31 December 2024	
30 September 2024	LB	(Romania)	Costin Amzăr	(United Arab Emirates) Al-Nasr SC	30 June 2025	
14 January 2025	RW	(Spain)	Alberto Soro	(Portugal) GD Chaves	30 June 2025	
3 February 2025	LW	(Moldova)	Petru Neagu	Unirea Slobozia	30 June 2025	
10 February 2025	RW	(Romania)	Antonio Bordușanu	Politehnica Iași	30 June 2025	
15 February 2025	RW	(Nigeria)	Hussaini Sanusi	Înainte Modelu	30 June 2025	
15 February 2025	AM	(Nigeria)	Peter Maapia	CSM Fetești	30 June 2025	
