= Andrei Bani =

Romanian-Jordanian footballer (born 2002)

Personal information
- Full name: Andrei Ahmed Bani Mustafa
- Date of birth: 22 August 2002 (age 24)
- Place of birth: Jerash, Jordan
- Height: 1.74 m (5 ft 9 in)
- Positions: Attacking midfielder; winger

Team information
- Current team: Al-Hussein
- Number: 14

Youth career
- 2012–2015: Pro Luceafărul București
- 2015–2020: Dinamo București

Senior career*
Years	Team	Apps	(Gls)
2020–2025	Dinamo București	113	(10)
2025	Oțelul Galați	10	(1)
2025–	Al-Hussein	6	(1)

International career^{‡}
2018	Romania U16	5	(0)
2018–2019	Romania U17	10	(1)
2019–2020	Romania U18	7	(1)
2021–2023	Romania U20	9	(0)
2024	Romania U21	2	(0)
- * Club domestic league appearances and goals as of 8 May 2026 ‡ National team caps and goals as of 10 September 2024

Andrei Ahmed Bani Mustafa (Arabic: أندري أحمد بني مصطفى; born 22 August 2002), also known as Ahmed Bani Mustafa (Arabic: أحمد بني مصطفى), is a professional footballer who plays as an attacking midfielder or a winger for Jordanian Pro League club Al-Hussein. Born in Jordan, he represented Romania at youth international level.

== Club career ==
Bani joined the youth setup of Dinamo București in 2015, having previously played for Pro Luceafărul București.

He made his professional debut for Dinamo on 23 February 2020, aged 17, in a 0–1 Liga I loss to Gaz Metan Mediaș. On 5 July that year, Bani scored his first goal in a 3–1 away win over Academica Clinceni.

With Romanian Liga I clubs obliged to field a player eligible for the Under-21 team, Bani made 7 appearances for the first team during the 2019–20 season and 17 appearances during the 2020–21 season, including 6 as a starter. He played 28 times for the team, mostly as a substitute, during the 2021–22 season, which marked the first relegation in club history.

Playing for Dinamo in Liga II during the 2022–23 season, under manager Ovidiu Burcă, Bani became one of the leaders of the team. He started 24 league games and made a total of 34 appearances, scoring 7 goals and producing 12 assists. The highlights of his season were the 6–0 victory against Unirea Constanța, when he scored once and produced 2 assists, and the play-off group game against FC Buzău, when he contributed with a goal and an assist to an important 2–2 away draw. At the end of the season, Dinamo won promotion back to Liga I.

Bani started the 2023–24 Liga I season as a regular starter for Dinamo, still eligible for the Under-21 rule. On 19 August 2023, he produced an assist for Cristian Costin in the 3–2 away win against FC Voluntari. On 29 August, he came on as a substitute for Antonio Bordușanu in the Romanian Cup game against Metaloglobus and he scored twice, bringing Dinamo a last minute 2–1 victory. After the arrival of new players and of manager Željko Kopić during the season, Bani lost his place in the first team, but made regular appearances as a substitute. With Dinamo playing in the Liga I relegation group, on 14 April 2024 Bani came on as a substitute for Darko Velkovski in the 82nd minute of the home game against Poli Iași, and he scored in the added time to bring his team a 1–0 victory. As several important players were injured, Bani was back in the first team for the last games of the season. On 4 May, he scored once and assisted Domagoj Pavičić in the 3–3 away draw against Universitatea Cluj. For this performance, he was named Man of the Match and in the Liga I Team of the Week. He also played in the two legs of the relegation play-off against Csíkszereda, producing an assist for Dennis Politic in the 2–0 victory that kept Dinamo in Liga I.

In the first games of the 2024–25 Liga I season, Bani made some impressive appearances as a substitute. On 27 July 2024, he came on in the 62nd minute of the away game against Sepsi and he assisted Petru Neagu in a 1–1 draw. In the following week, he produced another assist, for Dennis Politic, in a 4–1 home win against FC Buzău, after entering the game in the 58th minute. These good performances brought him back in the first team. On 24 August, he scored in the first minute of the 2–1 home victory against CS Universitatea Craiova, being selected in the Liga I Team of the Week.

=== Al-Hussein ===
On 7 July 2025, Bani Mustafa joined Jordanian Pro League club Al-Hussein for three seasons. On 19 August 2025, he made his debut and first start for the club on a Northern Derby match-up against Al-Ramtha, playing a total of 45 minutes.

== Personal life ==
Bani was born in Jerash, Jordan, to a Romanian mother and a Jordanian father.

== Career statistics ==
=== Club ===
As of match played 16 September 2026

Appearances and goals by club, season and competition
Club	Season	League			National cup		Continental		Other		Total	
Club	Season	Division	Apps	Goals	Apps	Goals	Apps	Goals	Apps	Goals	Apps	Goals
Dinamo București	2019–20	Liga I	6	1	2	0	—		—		8	1
Dinamo București	2020–21	Liga I	14	0	3	0	—		—		17	0
Dinamo București	2021–22	Liga I	26	0	1	0	—		1 (Note: Appearances in Liga I promotion/relegation play-offs)	0	28	0
Dinamo București	2022–23	Liga II	28	6	5	1	—		1	0	34	7
Dinamo București	2023–24	Liga I	27	2	3	2	—		2	0	32	4
Dinamo București	2024–25	Liga I	12	1	4	0	—		—		16	1
Dinamo București	Total		113	10	18	3	0	0	4	0	135	13
Oțelul Galați	2024–25	Liga I	10	1	—		—		—		10	1
Al-Hussein	2025–26	Jordanian Pro League	6	1	0	0	3 (Note: Appearances in AFC Champions League Two)	1	0	0	9	2
Al-Hussein	2026–27	Jordanian Pro League	0	0	0	0	1	0	—		1	0
Al-Hussein	Total		6	1	0	0	4	1	0	0	10	2
Career total			129	12	18	3	4	1	4	0	155	16

== Honours ==
Al-Hussein

- Jordanian Pro League: 2025–26
- Jordan FA Cup: 2025–26
- Jordan Super Cup: 2025
