= Stipe Perica =

Croatian footballer

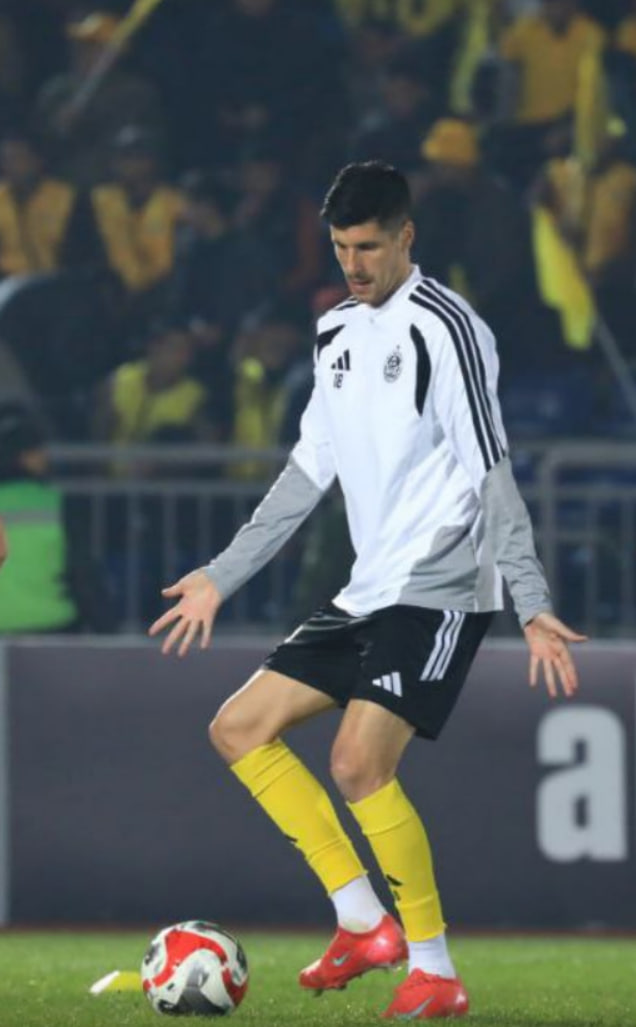
- Perica with Neftchi in 2026

Personal information
- Full name: Stipe Perica
- Date of birth: 7 July 1995 (age 31)
- Place of birth: Zadar, Croatia
- Height: 1.93 m (6 ft 4 in)
- Position: Striker

Team information
- Current team: Neftchi Fergana
- Number: 18

Youth career
- 2005–2012: Zadar

Senior career*
Years	Team	Apps	(Gls)
2012–2013	Zadar	20	(8)
2013–2016	Chelsea	0	(0)
2013–2015	→ NAC (loan)	35	(9)
2015–2016	→ Udinese (loan)	20	(3)
2016–2020	Udinese	49	(7)
2018	→ Frosinone (loan)	7	(0)
2019	→ Kasımpaşa (loan)	12	(2)
2019–2020	→ Mouscron (loan)	15	(7)
2020–2021	Watford	16	(1)
2021–2022	Maccabi Tel Aviv	35	(17)
2022–2024	Standard Liège	29	(4)
2024	Rijeka	6	(0)
2025	Dinamo București	32	(8)
2026–	Neftchi Fergana	20	(12)

International career
2013	Croatia U19	2	(0)
2013	Croatia U20	5	(1)
2013–2016	Croatia U21	12	(8)
- * Club domestic league appearances and goals as of 21:00, 10 September 2026 (UTC)

Stipe Perica (Croatian pronunciation: [stǐːpe pêritsa]; born 7 July 1995) is a Croatian footballer who plays as a striker for Uzbekistan Super League club Neftchi Fergana.

== Club career ==
=== Early career ===
Perica started his playing career in his home-country of Croatia with Zadar in 2012. He made his debut for the first team during the month of September 2012. In his first season, he scored 8 goals in 20 league matches, and 10 goals in all competitions.

=== Chelsea ===
On 1 August 2013, Perica signed for Chelsea with a transfer fee of €2.5m. After his arrival at Chelsea, the club loaned Perica out to Dutch club NAC Breda.

==== Loan to NAC Breda ====
On his NAC Breda debut he scored his first goal in a 1–5 victory away to Roda JC, having come on as a substitute. A few weeks later he scored the winning goal for 2–1 against Heracles Almelo in his fourth appearance. On 16 February 2014, he was sent-off just 4 minutes after being substituted on in the match against Feyenoord.

In August 2014, his loan deal was extended for the 2014–15 season. However, after the sacking of Breda's manager Nebojša Gudelj, his role was reduced to a bit-part player and he requested a move in search for more game time. On 22 January 2015, his loan with NAC Breda ended and Chelsea loaned him out to Udinese until June 2016.

=== Udinese ===
On 8 February 2015 against Napoli, Perica made his debut for Udinese, coming off the bench in the 78th minute for Bruno Fernandes. On 4 April 2015, Perica made his first start for Udinese in a match against Genoa that ended in a 1–1 draw. On 17 May, Perica scored the opener (his first for Udinese) against A.S. Roma, the match ended in a 1–2 loss for Udinese.

On 3 June 2015, Udinese extended Perica's loan deal for one and a half years. On 20 December 2015, Perica scored his first goal of the 2015–16 Serie A campaign in a 1–0 away victory over Torino, therefore scoring the winning goal in the 41st minute.

On 15 June 2016, Udinese activated a clause in Perica's contract, in which he would join the Italian side on a permanent basis.

==== Loans to Frosinone, Kasımpaşa and Mouscron ====
On 18 July 2018, Perica was loaned to newly promoted Serie A club Frosinone for a season. In January, he was recalled from Udinese to join Kasımpaşa after falling down the pecking order.

On 23 August 2019, Perica joined Belgian First Division A club Mouscron on loan until 30 June 2020.

=== Watford ===
On 7 September 2020, Perica joined EFL Championship club Watford from Udinese on a 2-year deal for an undisclosed fee.

He made his Watford debut in an EFL Cup tie against Oxford United on 15 September 2020. The game went to a penalty shootout and Perica converted his effort as Watford won. In the following round against Newport County, Perica was sent off for violent conduct as Watford lost 3–1. He scored his first goal for Watford in a 1–1 draw with Bournemouth on 24 October 2020.

=== Maccabi Tel Aviv ===
On 14 August 2021, Perica signed for Israeli side Maccabi Tel Aviv. On 14 September 2021, Perica scored the first goal of the new UEFA Europa Conference League.

=== Standard Liège ===
Perica was acquired by Belgian First Division A club Standard Liège on 2 September 2022, for 900k euros, a few days after he fled Israel in flight without the club's permission. He made his club doubt in a 2–0 home win against K.V. Kortrijk, when he entered the game as a substitute in the 80th minute.

=== Rijeka ===
Perica signed for Rijeka as a free agent on 4 September 2024.

== International career ==
Perica represented Croatia at the FIFA U-20 World Cup in 2013. He was Croatia's youngest player, aged 17, and scored in a 2–1 win over New Zealand on 29 June.

== Career statistics ==
As of match played 4 September 2026

Appearances by club, season and competition
Club	Season	League			National cup (Note: Includes Croatian Cup, KNVB Cup, Coppa Italia, Turkish Cup, Belgian Cup, Uzbekistan Cup)		League cup (Note: Includes EFL Cup, Toto Cup)		Continental		Other		Total	
Club	Season	Division	Apps	Goals	Apps	Goals	Apps	Goals	Apps	Goals	Apps	Goals	Apps	Goals
Zadar	2012–13	Prva HNL	20	8	4	2	—		—		—		24	10
NAC Breda (loan)	2013–14	Eredivisie	25	6	1	0	—		—		—		26	6
NAC Breda (loan)	2014–15	Eredivisie	10	3	1	0	—		—		—		11	3
NAC Breda (loan)	Total		35	9	2	0	—		—		—		37	9
Udinese (loan)	2014–15	Serie A	9	1	—		—		—		—		9	1
Udinese (loan)	2015–16	Serie A	11	2	2	1	—		—		—		13	3
Udinese	2016–17	Serie A	27	6	0	0	—		—		—		27	6
Udinese	2017–18	Serie A	22	1	0	0	—		—		—		22	1
Udinese	Total		69	10	2	1	—		—		—		71	11
Frosinone (loan)	2018–19	Serie A	7	0	1	0	—		—		—		8	0
Kasımpaşa (loan)	2018–19	Süper Lig	12	2	2	0	—		—		—		14	2
Mouscron (loan)	2019–20	Belgian First Division A	15	7	1	1	—		—		—		16	8
Watford	2020–21	Championship	16	1	0	0	2	0	—		—		18	1
Maccabi Tel Aviv	2021–22	Israeli Premier League	34	15	4	0	0	0	8 (Note: Appearances in UEFA Conference League)	2	—		46	17
Maccabi Tel Aviv	2022–23	Israeli Premier League	1	2	—		1	0	4	1	—		6	3
Maccabi Tel Aviv	Total		35	17	4	0	1	0	12	3	—		52	20
Standard Liège	2022–23	Belgian Pro League	23	4	2	0	—		—		4 (Note: Appearances in Belgian Pro League European play-offs)	0	29	4
Standard Liège	2023–24	Belgian Pro League	6	0	1	2	—		—		2	0	9	2
Standard Liège	Total		29	4	3	2	—		—		6	0	38	6
Rijeka	2024–25	HNL	6	0	2	0	—		—		—		8	0
Dinamo București	2024–25	Liga I	16	6	—		—		—		—		16	6
Dinamo București	2025–26	Liga I	16	2	2	0	—		—		—		18	2
Dinamo București	Total		32	8	2	0	—		—		—		34	8
Neftchi Fergana	2026	Uzbekistan Super League	19	11	1	1	—		0	0	1 (Note: Appearance in Uzbekistan Super Cup)	0	21	12
Career total			295	77	24	7	3	0	12	3	7	0	341	87

== Honours ==
Neftchi Fergana

- Uzbekistan Super Cup: 2026
