= Alexandru Roșca (footballer) =

Moldovan footballer (born 2003)

Personal information
- Full name: Alexandru Vasile Roșca-Ailiesei
- Date of birth: 12 November 2003 (age 22)
- Place of birth: Iași, România
- Height: 1.86 m (6 ft 1 in)
- Position: Goalkeeper

Team information
- Current team: Dinamo București
- Number: 73

Youth career
- –2016: Gloria Arad
- 2016–2021: UTA Arad

Senior career*
Years	Team	Apps	(Gls)
2021–2023	UTA Arad	0	(0)
2021	→ Crișul Chișineu-Criș (loan)		
2022	→ Progresul Pecica (loan)		
2023	→ 1599 Șelimbăr (loan)	1	(0)
2023–2024	1599 Șelimbăr	28	(0)
2024–	Dinamo București	33	(0)

International career^{‡}
2025	Romania U21	1	(0)
- * Club domestic league appearances and goals as of 23 May 2026 ‡ National team caps and goals as of 21 March 2025

Alexandru Vasile Roșca-Ailiesei (born 12 November 2003) is a Romanian professional footballer who plays as a goalkeeper for Liga I club Dinamo București.

== Club career ==
=== Dinamo București ===
In the summer of 2024, Dinamo paid 100,000 euro for the transfer of Alexandru from the Liga II team 1599 Șelimbăr. On 8 November 2024, Alexandru made his debut in Liga I in the match against CFR Cluj, after the injury to the starting goalkeeper, Adnan Golubovic.

== Career statistics ==
As of match played 28 October 2026

Appearances and goals by club, season and competition
Club	Season	League			Cupa României		Europe		Other		Total	
Club	Season	Division	Apps	Goals	Apps	Goals	Apps	Goals	Apps	Goals	Apps	Goals
UTA Arad	2021–22	Liga I	0	0	0	0	—		—		0	0
1599 Șelimbăr (loan)	2022–23	Liga II	1	0	—		—		—		1	0
1599 Șelimbăr	2023–24	Liga II	28	0	1	0	—		—		29	0
Dinamo București	2024–25	Liga I	22	0	1	0	—		—		23	0
Dinamo București	2025–26	Liga I	11	0	4	0	—		0	0	15	0
Dinamo București	2026–27	Liga I	0	0	2	0	—		—		2	0
Dinamo București	Total		33	0	7	0	—		0	0	40	0
Career total			62	0	8	0	0	0	0	0	70	0
