= Raul Rotund =

Romanian footballer

Personal information
- Full name: Raul Codruț Rotund
- Date of birth: 17 November 2005 (age 20)
- Place of birth: Cluj-Napoca, România
- Height: 1.85 m (6 ft 1 in)
- Position: Forward

Team information
- Current team: Concordia Chiajna
- Number: 30

Youth career
- –2023: Universitatea Cluj

Senior career*
Years	Team	Apps	(Gls)
2023–2024	Universitatea Cluj	0	(0)
2023–2024	→ 1599 Șelimbăr (loan)	27	(5)
2024–2026	Dinamo București	3	(0)
2025–2026	→ Unirea Slobozia (loan)	9	(2)
2026	→ ASA Târgu Mureș (loan)	8	(3)
2026–	Concordia Chiajna	3	(0)

International career^{‡}
2023	Romania U19	2	(0)
2025	Romania U20	3	(0)
- * Club domestic league appearances and goals as of 24 October 2026 ‡ National team caps and goals as of 14 November 2025

Raul Codruț Rotund (born 17 November 2005) is a Romanian professional footballer who plays as a forward for Liga II club Concordia Chiajna.

== Club career ==
=== Dinamo București ===
In the summer of 2024, Dinamo transferred Raul from Universitatea Cluj, after he played a season on loan at Liga II team 1599 Șelimbăr. Raul made his Liga I debut on 20 September 2024 in a 1–1 away draw at Oțelul Galați, coming on as a substitute for Andrei Mărginean.

== Career statistics ==
As of match played 29 October 2026

Appearances and goals by club, season and competition
Club	Season	League			Cupa României		Europe		Other		Total	
Club	Season	Division	Apps	Goals	Apps	Goals	Apps	Goals	Apps	Goals	Apps	Goals
1599 Șelimbăr (loan)	2023–24	Liga II	27	5	0	0	—		—		27	5
Dinamo București	2024–25	Liga I	3	0	1	0	—		—		4	0
Unirea Slobozia (loan)	2025–26	Liga I	9	2	1	0	—		—		9	2
ASA Târgu Mureș (loan)	2025–26	Liga II	8	3	—		—		—		8	3
Concordia Chiajna	2026–27	Liga II	3	0	2	0	—		—		5	0
Career total			50	10	4	0	—		—		54	10
