= Cristian Mihai =

Romanian footballer (born 2004)

Personal information
- Full name: Cristian Petrișor Mihai
- Date of birth: 23 September 2004 (age 22)
- Place of birth: Arad, Romania
- Height: 1.82 m (6 ft 0 in)
- Position: Midfielder

Team information
- Current team: Dinamo București
- Number: 21

Youth career
- –2022: UTA Arad

Senior career*
| Years | Team | Apps | (Gls) |
| 2022–2025 | UTA Arad | 65 | (1) |
| 2022–2023 | → Progresul Pecica (loan) | 28 | (3) |
| 2025– | Dinamo București | 27 | (1) |

International career^{‡}
| 2023 | Romania U20 | 2 | (1) |
| 2024–2026 | Romania U21 | 15 | (2) |
- * Club domestic league appearances and goals as of 7 October 2026 ‡ National team caps and goals as of 6 October 2026

Cristian Petrișor Mihai (Romanian pronunciation: [kristiˈan miˈhaj]; born 23 September 2004) is a Romanian professional footballer who plays as a midfielder for Liga I club Dinamo București.

== Club career ==
=== UTA Arad ===
A youth product of UTA Arad, Mihai started his senior career in 2022, while on loan at third division club Progresul Pecica. He went on to make his debut for UTA on 14 July 2023, aged 18, starting in a 1–1 away Liga I draw at Oțelul Galați.

On 14 December 2024, Mihai scored his first professional goal, also in a 1–1 away league draw at Oțelul Galați.

=== Dinamo București ===
During early April 2025, an agreement was reached regarding the transfer of Mihai to fellow Liga I team Dinamo București for a rumoured fee of €350,000.

== Career statistics ==
As of match played 28 October 2026

Appearances and goals by club, season and competition
| Club | Season | League | | | Cupa României | | Europe | | Other | | Total | |
| Club | Season | Division | Apps | Goals | Apps | Goals | Apps | Goals | Apps | Goals | Apps | Goals |
|---|---|---|---|---|---|---|---|---|---|---|---|---|
| UTA Arad | 2023–24 | Liga I | 36 | 0 | 1 | 0 | — | | — | | 37 | 0 |
| UTA Arad | 2024–25 | Liga I | 29 | 1 | 1 | 0 | — | | — | | 30 | 1 |
| UTA Arad | Total | | 65 | 1 | 2 | 0 | — | | — | | 67 | 1 |
| Progresul Pecica (loan) | 2022–23 | Liga III | 28 | 3 | 0 | 0 | — | | — | | 28 | 3 |
| Dinamo București | 2025–26 | Liga I | 25 | 1 | 3 | 0 | — | | 0 | 0 | 28 | 1 |
| Dinamo București | 2026–27 | Liga I | 2 | 0 | 2 | 0 | — | | — | | 4 | 0 |
| Dinamo București | Total | | 27 | 1 | 5 | 0 | — | | 0 | 0 | 32 | 1 |
| Career total | | | 120 | 5 | 7 | 0 | — | | 0 | 0 | 127 | 5 |
