= Hakim Abdallah =

Footballer (born 1998)

Personal information
- Full name: Hakim Djamel Abdallah
- Date of birth: 9 January 1998 (age 28)
- Place of birth: Saint-Leu, Réunion, France
- Height: 1.87 m (6 ft 2 in)
- Position: Forward

Team information
- Current team: UTA Arad
- Number: 11

Youth career
- 2004–2011: AS Saint-Martin-des-Champs
- 2011–2015: Brest
- 2016–2017: Stoke City

Senior career*
Years	Team	Apps	(Gls)
2015–2016	Brest B	9	(2)
2016–2018	Stoke City	0	(0)
2017	→ Avranches (loan)	14	(4)
2017–2018	→ El Ejido (loan)	11	(0)
2018–2020	Nantes B	27	(1)
2020–2021	Swift Hesperange	30	(23)
2021–2022	Lierse	27	(7)
2022–2023	Virton	30	(5)
2023–2025	Dinamo București	67	(9)
2025–	UTA Arad	47	(8)

International career^{‡}
2014	France U16	4	(0)
2016	France U19	2	(1)
2020–	Madagascar	25	(2)
- * Club domestic league appearances and goals as of 6 November 2026 ‡ National team caps and goals as of 17 November 2026

Hakim Djamel Abdallah (born 9 January 1998) is a professional footballer who plays as a forward for Liga I club UTA Arad. Born in France, he represents Madagascar at international level.

== Club career ==
=== Dinamo București ===
On 27 June 2023, Dinamo București announced the signing of Abdallah, their first transfer after the team won promotion back to Liga I. He made his official debut for the club on 17 July 2023, when he started the game and played 65 minutes in the 0–2 home loss against Universitatea Craiova. After 12 games without scoring, his first goal for the team came on 8 October 2023, in the 1–1 home draw against CFR Cluj. His performance in that match was however criticized in the media, as he missed an important chance to score in the 70th minute, when the score was 1-1. On 18 December 2023, he came in as a substitute for Dennis Politic in the 73rd minute, and he scored the second goal in the 2–0 away win against Botoșani. In the following game, on 22 December 2023, Abdallah came once again as a substitute in the 46th minute, and he obtained the deciding penalty in the last minutes of the 1–0 win against Voluntari, being selected as Man of the Match. On 27 January 2024, Abdallah scored in the 1–2 loss against Rapid București and, despite the result, he was named Man of the Match. After this match, Rapid București manager Cristiano Bergodi declared: "It was a very nice goal from Abdallah, I like a lot how he played against us. He is good, very good!". On 18 February 2024, he converted a penalty and produced two assists in the 3–1 home win against Oțelul Galați entering once again the Liga 1 Team of the Week. After a long period of poor form in the relegation group games, Abdallah opened the score on 12 May 2024 in the 2–0 victory against UTA Arad, a victory which allowed Dinamo to avoid relegation.

Abdallah began the 2024-25 Liga I season playing on the right side of a three-man attack line, under manager Željko Kopić. In the first game of the season, on 14 July, he scored once and assisted Cătălin Cîrjan in the 2–3 away loss against CFR Cluj, being selected in the Liga 1 Team of the Week. On 21 July, he opened the score in the 4–1 home win over Petrolul Ploiești.

== International career ==
Abdallah was born in the French overseas territory of Réunion to a Comorian father and Malagasy mother. He debuted for the Madagascar national team in a friendly 2–1 loss to Burkina Faso on 11 October 2020.

== Career statistics ==
=== Club ===
As of match played 6 November 2026

Appearances and goals by club, season and competition
Club	Season	League			National cup (Note: Includes Coupe de France, Belgian Cup, Cupa României)		Europe		Other		Total	
Club	Season	Division	Apps	Goals	Apps	Goals	Apps	Goals	Apps	Goals	Apps	Goals
Brest B	2014–15	CFA 2	5	0	—		—		—		5	0
Brest B	2015–16	CFA 2	4	2	—		—		—		4	2
Brest B	Total		9	2	—		—		—		9	2
Avranches (loan)	2016–17	Championnat National	14	4	3	0	—		—		17	4
El Ejido (loan)	2017–18	Segunda División B	11	0	—		—		—		11	0
Nantes B	2018–19	Championnat National 2	16	1	—		—		—		16	1
Nantes B	2019–20	Championnat National 2	11	0	—		—		—		11	0
Nantes B	Total		27	1	—		—		—		27	1
Swift Hesperange	2020–21	Luxembourg National Division	30	23	0	0	—		—		30	23
Lierse	2021–22	Belgian First Division B	27	7	1	0	—		—		28	7
Virton	2022–23	Challenger Pro League	30	5	1	0	—		—		31	5
Dinamo București	2023–24	Liga I	35	5	3	0	—		2 (Note: Appearances in Liga I promotion/relegation play-offs)	0	40	5
Dinamo București	2024–25	Liga I	31	4	4	0	—		—		35	4
Dinamo București	2025–26	Liga I	1	0	—		—		—		1	0
Dinamo București	Total		67	9	7	0	—		2	0	76	9
UTA Arad	2025–26	Liga I	32	6	4	1	—		—		36	7
UTA Arad	2026–27	Liga I	15	2	2	1	—		—		17	3
UTA Arad	Total		47	8	6	2	—		—		53	10
Career total			262	59	18	2	—		2	0	282	61

=== International ===
As of match played 17 November 2026

National team	Year	Apps	Goals
Madagascar
Madagascar	2020	3	0
Madagascar	2021	7	1
Madagascar	2022	0	0
Madagascar	2023	3	0
Madagascar	2024	1	0
Madagascar	2025	4	1
Madagascar	2026	7	0
Total		25	2

=== International goals ===
Scores and results list Madagascar's goal tally first, score column indicates score after each Abdallah goal.

No.	Date	Venue	Opponent	Score	Result	Competition
1.	14 November 2021	Mahamasina Municipal Stadium, Antananarivo, Madagascar	Tanzania	1–1	1–1	2022 FIFA World Cup qualification
2.	8 September 2025	Larbi Zaouli Stadium, Casablanca, Morocco	Chad	3–1	3–1	2026 FIFA World Cup qualification

== Honours ==
Nantes B

- Championnat National 2: 2018–19
