= Antonio Bordușanu =

Romanian footballer (born 2004)

Personal information
- Full name: Antonio Alexandru Bordușanu
- Date of birth: 10 August 2004 (age 22)
- Place of birth: Bucharest, Romania
- Height: 1.69 m (5 ft 7 in)
- Position: Winger

Team information
- Current team: CSM Slatina
- Number: 97

Youth career
- 2011–2012: Sportul Studențesc
- 2012–2014: Dinamo București
- 2014: Steaua Bucureşti
- 2014–2021: Dinamo București

Senior career*
Years	Team	Apps	(Gls)
2021–2026	Dinamo București	60	(2)
2025	→ Politehnica Iași (loan)	2	(0)
2026–	CSM Slatina	4	(0)

International career^{‡}
2021	Romania U17	1	(0)
2021–2022	Romania U18	8	(3)
2022	Romania U19	3	(0)
2024	Romania U20	3	(0)
- * Club domestic league appearances and goals as of 10 October 2026 ‡ National team caps and goals as of 5 September 2024

Antonio Alexandru Bordușanu (born 10 August 2004) is a Romanian professional footballer who plays as a winger for Liga II club CSM Slatina.

He entered the history of Dinamo București as the first ever goal-scorer for the team in the second division, in a 1–0 win against Progresul Spartac in August 2022.

== Club career ==
=== Dinamo București ===
A product of the Dinamo București academy, he made his senior debut for the club on 26 February 2021 in a 0–5 defeat against Viitorul Constanta, when he replaced Diego Fabbrini in the 89th minute.

During the 2021–22 Liga I season, he became a first-team regular, especially in the second part of the season, when he was used as the mandatory under-21 player in the team, as required by the rules of the national competition. On 22 February 2022, he was selected in the team of the week by the LPF, after the game against Gaz Metan Mediaș where he scored his first ever senior goal in a 4–0 win. The season finished with the relegation of the team in Liga II, following the defeat in the play-out games against Universitatea Cluj.

== Career statistics ==
As of match played 10 October 2026

Appearances and goals by club, season and competition
Club	Season	League			Cupa României		Europe		Other		Total	
Club	Season	Division	Apps	Goals	Apps	Goals	Apps	Goals	Apps	Goals	Apps	Goals
Dinamo București	2020–21	Liga I	2	0	0	0	—		—		2	0
Dinamo București	2021–22	Liga I	16	1	0	0	—		1 (Note: Appearances in promotion/relegation play-offs)	0	17	1
Dinamo București	2022–23	Liga II	14	1	1	0	—		0	0	15	1
Dinamo București	2023–24	Liga I	17	0	1	0	—		2	0	20	0
Dinamo București	2024–25	Liga I	8	0	3	0	—		—		11	0
Dinamo București	2025–26	Liga I	3	0	1	0	—		0	0	4	0
Dinamo București	Total		60	2	6	0	—		3	0	69	2
Politehnica Iași (loan)	2024–25	Liga I	2	0	0	0	—		0	0	2	0
CSM Slatina	2026–27	Liga II	4	0	1	0	—		—		5	0
Career total			66	2	7	0	0	0	3	0	76	2
