= Astrit Selmani =

Kosovan footballer (born 1997)

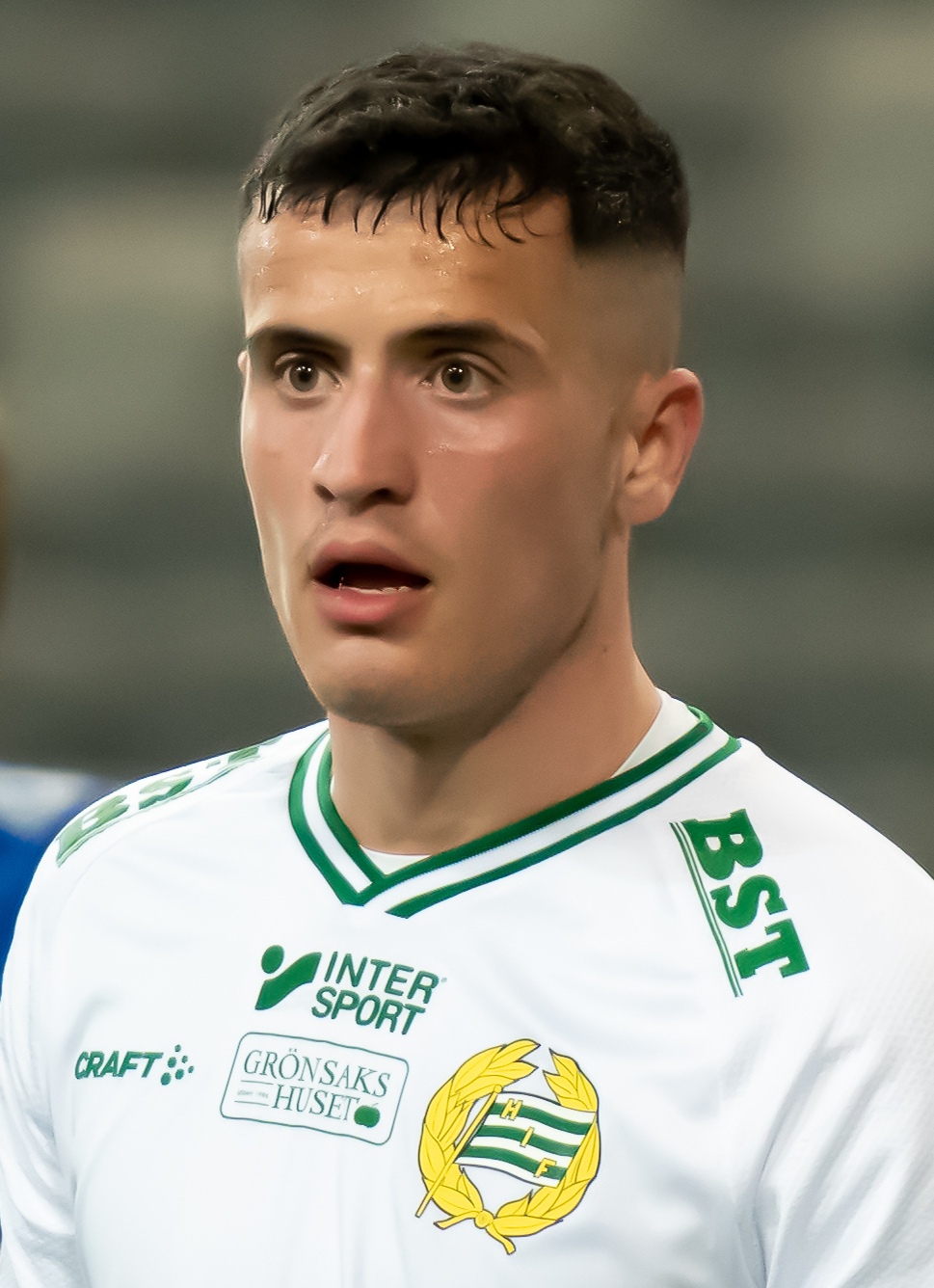
- Selmani with Hammarby IF in 2021

Personal information
- Full name: Astrit Selmani
- Date of birth: 13 May 1997 (age 29)
- Place of birth: Malmö, Sweden
- Height: 1.84 m (6 ft 0 in)
- Position: Striker

Team information
- Current team: Shaanxi Union
- Number: 9

Youth career
- –2009: Malmö FF
- 2009–2013: Kulladals FF

Senior career*
Years	Team	Apps	(Gls)
2014–2015	BK Olympic	37	(14)
2016	Ängelholms FF	6	(0)
2016	Kristianstad FC	8	(0)
2017	FC Rosengård	22	(4)
2018	Torns IF	28	(13)
2019–2020	Varbergs BoIS	51	(30)
2021–2022	Hammarby IF	39	(11)
2022–2024	Hapoel Be'er Sheva	10	(2)
2023	→ Midtjylland (loan)	3	(0)
2023	→ IFK Göteborg (loan)	12	(0)
2024–2025	Dinamo București	46	(15)
2025–	Shaanxi Union	10	(3)

International career^{‡}
2021–	Kosovo	5	(1)
- * Club domestic league appearances and goals as of 18 October 2025 ‡ National team caps and goals as of 24 March 2022

Astrit Selmani (born 13 May 1997) is a professional footballer who plays as a striker for China League One club Shaanxi Union. Born in Sweden, he plays for the Kosovo national team.

== Club career ==
=== Early career and Superettan debut ===
Selmani started to play football with local club Malmö FF as a youngster. In 2009, at age 12, he injured his cruciate ligament and left the club for Kulladals IF. At the age of 17, Selmani joined BK Olympic in Division 3, the Swedish fifth tier, where he made his senior debut. In total, he played 37 matches and scored 14 goals for the side. Before the start of the 2016 season, Selmani joined Ängelholms FF in Superettan, Sweden's second highest league. On 3 April 2016, he made his debut in a 1–0 home win against Syrianska FC, after coming on as a substitute in the 81st minute in place of Oliver Stojanović-Fredin.

=== Years in the third tier ===
==== Kristianstad FC ====
On 17 July 2016, Selmani joined Division 1 side Kristianstad FC in the third tier. On 21 August 2016, he made his debut in a 1–0 away defeat against Landskrona BoIS after coming on as a substitute in the 84th minute in place of Anton Bloom.

==== FC Rosengård ====
On 24 November 2016, Selmani joined fellow Division 1 club FC Rosengård, a transfer that came to effect in January 2017. On 15 April the same year, he made his debut in a 0–1 home defeat against Skövde AIK, after coming on as a substitute in the 75th minute in place of Mohamed Ramadan.

==== Torns IF ====
On 8 February 2018, Selmani joined Torns IF in Division 1. Two months later, he made his competitive debut for the club in a 1–2 away win against Lunds BK after being named in the starting line-up.

=== Varbergs BoIS ===
==== 2019 season ====
On 21 January 2019, Selmani returned to Superettan, joining Varbergs BoIS. On 30 March 2019, he made his debut against Mjällby AIF after being named in the starting line-up and scored his side's only goal in a 0–1 away win. Scoring 15 goals in 27 league games, he led the team to their first promotion to Allsvenskan, finishing 2nd in the table.

==== 2020 season ====
In 2020, Selmani captained the side in Allsvenskan, as Varberg finished 11th in their first ever season in the Swedish top tier. He scored 15 goals in 24 fixtures placing himself as the second best scorer in Allsvenskan, only behind Christoffer Nyman.

=== Hammarby IF ===
Astrit Selmani is a straight replacement for Aron Jóhannsson who left the club earlier this month.

— Hammarby's CEO Henrik Kindlund shares his impressions on Selmani's transfer.

On 18 December 2020, Selmani transferred to fellow Allsvenskan club Hammarby IF, signing a four-year contract. The transfer fee was reportedly set at around 7-8 million Swedish kronor, making Selmani the most expensive acquisition in Hammarby's history.

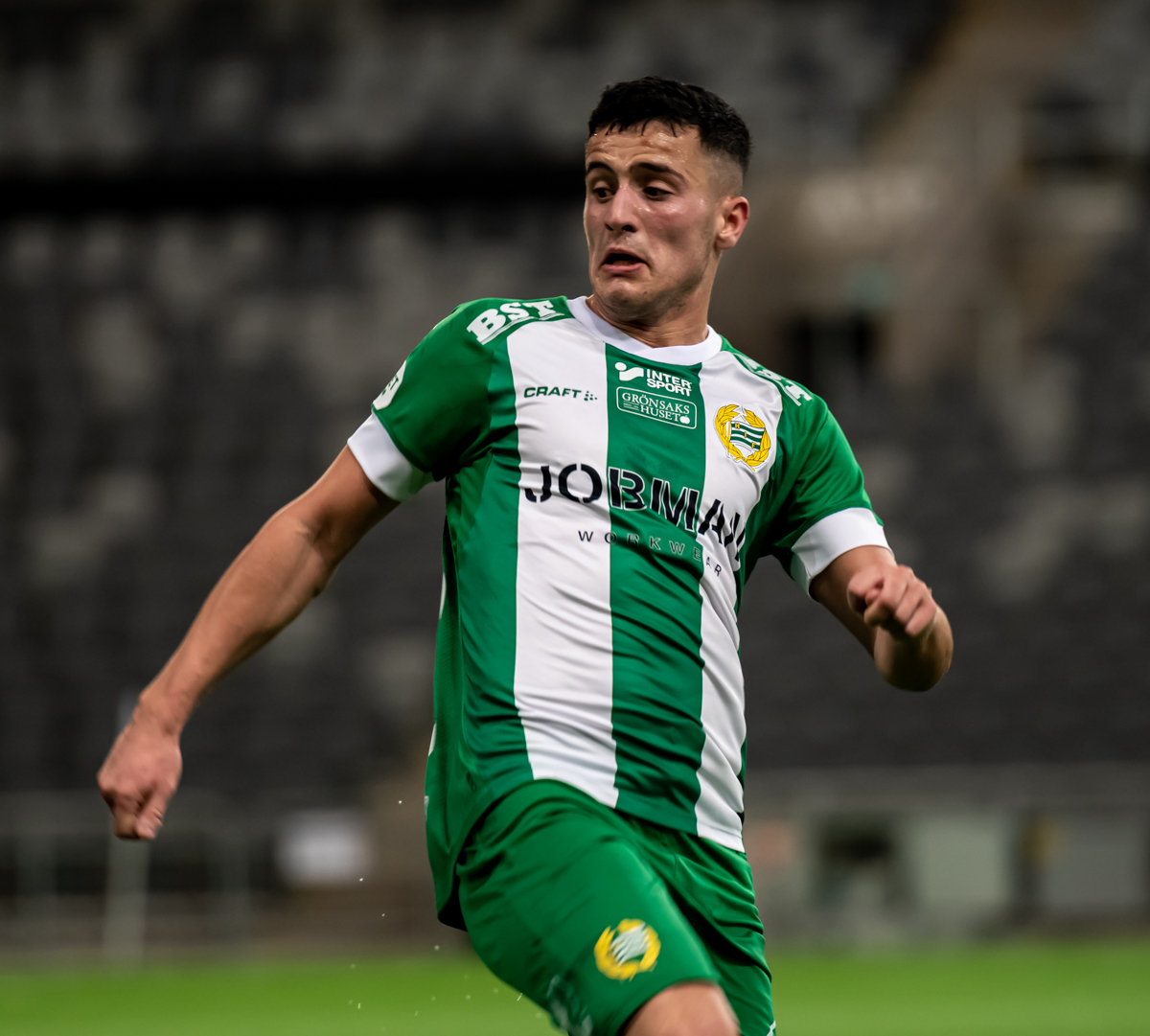
Selmani in action with Hammarby IF in 2021

On 20 February 2021, he made his competitive debut for the club in a group stage match in Svenska Cupen, the main domestic cup, against AFC Eskilstuna after being named in the starting line-up and provided one assist and scored his side's second goal in a 4–1 home win.

On 16 May 2021, Selmani scored his first goal in Allsvenskan for Hammarby in his twelfth appearance for the club in a 2–2 home draw against rivals Djurgårdens IF. Fourteen days later, he won the 2020–21 Svenska Cupen with Hammarby through a 5–4 win on penalties after a full time without goals against BK Häcken in the final, where he scored the deciding penalty.

On 22 July 2021, Selmani made his continental debut in the 2021–22 UEFA Europa Conference League second qualifying round against Slovenian side Maribor after being named in the starting line-up and scored his side's three goals, which were also his first hat-trick for the club during a 3–1 home win. He followed it up by scoring a brace against Čukarički in a 5–1 home win in the second leg (6–4 on aggregate) of the third qualifying round, before the side was knocked out by Basel (4–4 on aggregate) after a penalty shoot-out in the play-off round.

Selmani featured in the final of the 2021–22 Svenska Cupen, in which Hammarby lost by 4–5 on penalties to Malmö FF after the game ended in a 0–0 draw. Selmani was the one who missed the deciding penalty.

=== Hapoel Be'er Sheva ===
On 18 July 2022, Selmani transferred to Hapoel Be'er Sheva in the Israeli Premier League, signing a three-year contract. The transfer fee was reportedly set at around 10 million Swedish kronor. His debut with Hapoel Be'er Sheva came three days later in the 2022–23 UEFA Europa Conference League second qualifying round against Dinamo Minsk after coming on as a substitute at 58th minute in place of Sagiv Yehezkel.

==== Loan to Midtjylland ====
On 31 January 2023, Selmani was sent on loan to FC Midtjylland through the remainder of the Danish Superliga campaign, with an option to buy.

=== Dinamo București ===
On 10 February 2024, Dinamo București announced the signing of Selmani. He made his debut for the team on 23 February, coming in as a substitute for Gonçalo Gregório in the 0–4 loss against CFR Cluj. He scored his first goal for the club on 23 April 2024, in the 1–2 away loss against FC Botoșani, having what was generally considered an underwhelming season.

Selmani remained at the club for the 2024–25 season. On 21 July, he scored once and produced two assists in the 4–1 home win over Petrolul Ploiești. He was selected as Man of the Match, and as part of the Liga 1 Team of the Week for this performance. On 2 August, he scored in the 4–1 home win over Gloria Buzău.

== International career ==
Born and raised in Sweden, Selmani is of Kosovo Albanian origin from Mitrovica. He was eligible to represent three countries on international level, either Albania, Kosovo or Sweden. On 17 March 2021, the Football Federation of Kosovo announced that Selmani had decided to represent their national team, and was planned to get called up to the 2022 FIFA World Cup qualification matches against Sweden and Spain, but was ultimately left out of the squad due to testing positive for COVID-19.

Selmani was also called up by Kosovo to the matches in June and September 2021, but due to the lack of a passport he was forced to stay as an unused substitute. On 15 September 2021, seven days after the end of the gathering in the September matches he received his passport. His debut with Kosovo came on 9 October 2021 in the 2022 FIFA World Cup qualification match against Sweden after coming on as a substitute in the 70th minute in place of Zymer Bytyqi.

On 24 March 2022, Selmani scored his first goal for Kosovo in his fifth appearance for the country in a 5–0 home win over Burkina Faso.

== Career statistics ==
=== Club ===
As of match played 16 May 2025

Club	Season	League			National cup (Note: Includes Svenska Cupen, Israel State Cup, Cupa României)		Europe		Total	
Club	Season	Division	Apps	Goals	Apps	Goals	Apps	Goals	Apps	Goals
BK Olympic	2014	Division 3	18	5	1	1	—		19	6
BK Olympic	2015	Division 3	19	9	0	0	—		19	9
BK Olympic	Total		37	14	1	1	—		38	15
Ängelholms FF	2016	Superettan	6	0	2	0	—		8	0
Kristianstad FC	2016	Division 1	8	0	2	0	—		10	0
FC Rosengård	2017	Division 1	22	4	1	0	—		23	4
Torns IF	2018	Division 1	28	13	2	1	—		30	14
Varbergs BoIS	2019	Superettan	27	15	4	2	—		31	17
Varbergs BoIS	2020	Allsvenskan	24	15	1	0	—		25	15
Varbergs BoIS	Total		51	30	5	2	—		56	32
Hammarby IF	2021	Allsvenskan	26	9	7	1	6 (Note: Appearances in UEFA Europa Conference League)	5	39	15
Hammarby IF	2022	Allsvenskan	13	2	6	4	—		19	6
Hammarby IF	Total		39	11	13	5	6	5	58	21
Hapoel Be'er Sheva	2022–23	Israeli Premier League	10	2	3	0	11	1	24	3
Midtjylland (loan)	2022–23	Danish Superliga	3	0	—		1 (Note: Appearances in UEFA Europa League)	0	4	0
IFK Göteborg (loan)	2023	Allsvenskan	12	0	1	1	—		13	1
Dinamo București	2023–24	Liga I	10	1	—		0	0	10	1
Dinamo București	2024–25	Liga I	36	14	3	0	—		39	14
Dinamo București	Total		46	15	3	0	0	0	49	15
Career total			262	89	33	10	18	6	313	105

=== International ===
As of match played on 24 March 2022

National team	Year	Apps	Goals
Kosovo
Kosovo	2021	4	0
Kosovo	2022	1	1
Total		5	1

== Honours ==
BK Olympic

- Division 3 – Södra Götaland: 2015

Hammarby IF

- Svenska Cupen: 2020–21

Hapoel Be'er Sheva

- Toto Cup runner-up: 2022–23
