= Andrei Mărginean =

Romanian footballer

Personal information
- Full name: Iulius Andrei Mărginean
- Date of birth: 3 July 2001 (age 25)
- Place of birth: Zlatna, Romania
- Height: 1.90 m (6 ft 3 in)
- Positions: Defensive midfielder; centre-back

Team information
- Current team: Dinamo București
- Number: 90

Youth career
- –2018: CS Zlatna
- 2018–2021: Sassuolo

Senior career*
Years	Team	Apps	(Gls)
2021–2025	Sassuolo	0	(0)
2021–2022	→ Messina (loan)	21	(4)
2022–2023	→ Novara (loan)	31	(4)
2023–2024	→ Ternana (loan)	10	(0)
2024–2025	→ Dinamo București (loan)	29	(2)
2025–	Dinamo București	36	(1)

International career
2017–2018	Romania U17	7	(0)
2018–2019	Romania U18	5	(0)
2021	Romania U20	4	(0)
2022	Romania U21	2	(0)
- * Club domestic league appearances and goals as of 25 October 2026

Iulius Andrei Mărginean (born 3 July 2001) is a Romanian professional footballer who plays as a defensive midfielder or a centre-back for Liga I club Dinamo București.

== Club career ==
=== Messina ===
Andrei made his senior debut for Messina on 12 September 2021, in a 2–1 away loss over Monopoli counting for the Serie C.

=== Novara ===
On 4 August 2022, Mărginean was loaned to Novara.

=== Ternana ===
On 12 August 2023, Mărginean joined Ternana in Serie B for a season-long loan.

=== Dinamo Bucureşti ===
On 19 July 2024, Mărginean was sent on loan to Liga I club Dinamo Bucureşti for a season, with the option of a permanent transfer.

== Career statistics ==
As of match played 25 October 2026

Appearances and goals by club, season and competition
Club	Season	League			National cup (Note: Includes Coppa Italia Serie C, Cupa României)		Europe		Other		Total	
Club	Season	Division	Apps	Goals	Apps	Goals	Apps	Goals	Apps	Goals	Apps	Goals
Messina (loan)	2021–22	Serie C	21	4	1	0	—		—		22	4
Novara (loan)	2022–23	Serie C	31	4	1	1	—		0	0	32	5
Ternana (loan)	2023–24	Serie B	10	0	0	0	—		—		10	0
Dinamo București (loan)	2024–25	Liga I	29	2	4	0	—		—		33	2
Dinamo București	2025–26	Liga I	23	0	4	0	—		1 (Note: Appearances in Liga I European play-offs)	0	28	0
Dinamo București	2026–27	Liga I	13	1	1	0	—		—		14	1
Dinamo București	Total		36	1	5	0	—		1	0	42	1
Career total			127	11	11	1	—		1	0	139	12
