= Cătălin Cîrjan =

Romanian footballer (born 2002)

Personal information
- Full name: Cătălin Ionuț Cîrjan
- Date of birth: 1 December 2002 (age 23)
- Place of birth: Bucharest, Romania
- Height: 1.74 m (5 ft 9 in)
- Position: Midfielder

Team information
- Current team: Dinamo București
- Number: 10

Youth career
- –2019: Viitorul Domnești
- 2019–2023: Arsenal

Senior career*
Years	Team	Apps	(Gls)
2023–2024	Arsenal	0	(0)
2023–2024	→ Rapid București (loan)	17	(0)
2024–	Dinamo București	91	(18)

International career^{‡}
2018	Romania U16	1	(0)
2023–2025	Romania U21	6	(0)
2025–	Romania	5	(0)
- * Club domestic league appearances and goals as of 6 November 2026 ‡ National team caps and goals as of 17 November 2026

Cătălin Ionuț Cîrjan (Romanian pronunciation: [kətəˈlin joˈnuts kɨrˈʒan]; born 1 December 2002) is a Romanian professional footballer who plays as a midfielder for Liga I club Dinamo București, which he captains, and the Romania national team.

== Club career ==
=== Early career / Arsenal ===
During his junior years, Cîrjan was part of the youth setup of lower league team Viitorul Domnești, before moving to Premier League club Arsenal in July 2019.

Serious knee injuries during his time in London sidelined his development for over a year. On 24 May 2022 however, it was announced that Cîrjan had agreed to a new contract with Arsenal. After his appearance in a friendly with Boreham Wood, Cîrjan experienced a 480-day gap before returning to action in an under-21 match in August 2022. By the following month, he resumed training with the first-team squad.

On 23 June 2023, after several weeks of rumours, Cîrjan returned to Romania by signing for Liga I club Rapid București on a one-year loan. He made his debut as a senior in a goalless league draw with Sepsi OSK on 14 July. During his spell, Cîrjan started in only seven out of 17 Liga I appearances and did not score any goals.

In the summer of 2024, Cîrjan left Arsenal upon the expiration of his contract.

=== Dinamo București ===
On 13 June 2024, Cîrjan agreed to a three-year contract with Rapid București's cross-town rivals Dinamo București, being assigned the number 10 jersey. He started and scored on debut on 14 July, in a 2–3 away Liga I loss to CFR Cluj. He scored again one week later, in a 4–1 home win over Petrolul Ploiești.

As a result of his efficient start to the season, Cîrjan was named Romania Player of the Month for July 2024 by the Gazeta Sporturilor website.

== Career statistics ==
As of match played 6 November 2026

Appearances and goals by club, season and competition
Club	Season	League			Cupa României		Europe		Other		Total	
Club	Season	Division	Apps	Goals	Apps	Goals	Apps	Goals	Apps	Goals	Apps	Goals
Rapid București (loan)	2023–24	Liga I	17	0	2	0	—		—		19	0
Dinamo București	2024–25	Liga I	39	7	3	1	—		—		42	8
Dinamo București	2025–26	Liga I	38	7	5	1	—		1 (Note: Appearances in Liga I European play-offs)	0	44	8
Dinamo București	2026–27	Liga I	14	4	2	1	—		—		16	5
Dinamo București	Total		91	18	10	3	—		1	0	102	21
Career total			108	18	12	3	—		1	0	121	21

=== International ===
As of match played 17 November 2026.

Appearances and goals by national team and year
National team	Year	Apps	Goals
Romania
Romania	2025	1	0
Romania	2026	4	0
Total		5	0

== Honours ==
Individual

- Liga I Team of the Season: 2025–26
