= Răzvan Pașcalău =

Romanian footballer

Personal information
- Full name: Răzvan Bogdan Pașcalău
- Date of birth: 5 May 2004 (age 22)
- Place of birth: Cluj-Napoca, Romania
- Height: 1.89 m (6 ft 2 in)
- Position: Centre back

Team information
- Current team: Cosenza
- Number: 4

Youth career
- 2012–2020: Universitatea Cluj
- 2013–2014: → Viitorul Mihai Georgescu (loan)
- 2020–2024: Lecce

Senior career*
Years	Team	Apps	(Gls)
2024–2026	Dinamo București	2	(0)
2025–2026	→ CS Dinamo București (loan)	14	(0)
2026–	Cosenza	5	(0)

International career^{‡}
2022	Romania U18	2	(0)
2022–2023	Romania U19	5	(0)
2024–2025	Romania U20	5	(0)
2025–2026	Romania U21	5	(0)
- * Club domestic league appearances and goals as of 20 September 2026 ‡ National team caps and goals as of 6 October 2026

Răzvan Bogdan Pașcalău (born 5 May 2004) is a Romanian professional footballer who plays as a centre back for Serie C Group C club Cosenza.

== Career statistics ==
As of 20 September 2026

Appearances and goals by club, season and competition
Club	Season	League			National cup (Note: Includes Cupa României, Coppa Italia Serie C)		Europe		Other		Total	
Club	Season	Division	Apps	Goals	Apps	Goals	Apps	Goals	Apps	Goals	Apps	Goals
Dinamo București	2024–25	Liga I	1	0	1	0	—		—		2	0
Dinamo București	2025–26	Liga I	1	0	—		—		—		1	0
Dinamo București	Total		2	0	1	0	—		—		3	0
CS Dinamo București (loan)	2025–26	Liga II	14	0	1	0	—		2 (Note: Appearances in Liga II relegation play-offs)	0	17	0
Cosenza	2026–27	Serie C	5	0	2	0	—		—		7	0
Career total			21	0	4	0	—		2	0	26	0
