= Cristian Licsandru =

Romanian footballer

Personal information
- Full name: Mihail Cristian Licsandru
- Date of birth: 27 March 2003 (age 23)
- Place of birth: Ploiești, Romania
- Height: 1.78 m (5 ft 10 in)
- Positions: Centre-back; defensive midfielder

Team information
- Current team: Concordia Chiajna (on loan from Dinamo București)
- Number: 29

Youth career
- –2024: Petrolul Ploiești

Senior career*
Years	Team	Apps	(Gls)
2021–2024	Petrolul Ploiești	0	(0)
2021–2022	→ Blejoi (loan)		
2022–2023	→ Voluntari II (loan)		
2023–2024	→ Tunari (loan)	4	(0)
2024–	Dinamo București	9	(0)
2026–	→ Concordia Chiajna (loan)	9	(0)
- * Club domestic league appearances and goals as of 1 November 2026

Mihail Cristian Licsandru (born 27 March 2003) is a Romanian professional footballer who plays as a centre-back or a defensive midfielder for Liga II club Concordia Chiajna, on loan from Liga I club Dinamo București.

== Career statistics ==
As of 1 November 2026

Appearances and goals by club, season and competition
Club	Season	League			Cupa României		Europe		Other		Total	
Club	Season	Division	Apps	Goals	Apps	Goals	Apps	Goals	Apps	Goals	Apps	Goals
Blejoi (loan)	2021–22	Liga III	?	?	?	?	—		—		?	?
Voluntari II (loan)	2022–23	Liga III	?	?	—		—		—		?	?
Tunari (loan)	2023–24	Liga II	4	0	2	0	—		—		6	0
Dinamo București	2023–24	Liga I	0	0	—		—		0	0	0	0
Dinamo București	2024–25	Liga I	9	0	2	0	—		—		11	0
Dinamo București	2025–26	Liga I	0	0	0	0	—		0	0	0	0
Dinamo București	2026–27	Liga I	0	0	—		—		—		0	0
Dinamo București	Total		9	0	2	0	—		0	0	11	0
Concordia Chiajna (loan)	2026–27	Liga II	9	0	4	0	—		—		13	0
Career total			22	0	8	0	—		0	0	30	0
