= Casian Soare =

Romanian professional footballer

Personal information
- Full name: Casian Ștefan Soare
- Date of birth: 24 November 2006 (age 19)
- Place of birth: Sibiu, România
- Height: 1.77 m (5 ft 10 in)
- Position: Midfielder

Youth career
- –2019: Interstar Sibiu
- 2017–2019: → Hermannstadt (loan)

Senior career*
Years	Team	Apps	(Gls)
2023–2025	1599 Șelimbăr	40	(3)
2025–2026	Dinamo București	2	(0)
2026	→ CS Dinamo București (loan)	10	(0)
- * Club domestic league appearances and goals as of 2 May 2026

Casian Ștefan Soare (born 24 November 2006) is a Romanian professional footballer who plays as a midfielder.

== Career statistics ==
As of 23 May 2026

Appearances and goals by club, season and competition
Club	Season	League			Cupa României		Europe		Other		Total	
Club	Season	Division	Apps	Goals	Apps	Goals	Apps	Goals	Apps	Goals	Apps	Goals
1599 Șelimbăr	2022–23	Liga II	1	0	—		—		—		1	0
1599 Șelimbăr	2023–24	Liga II	24	2	1	0	—		—		25	2
1599 Șelimbăr	2024–25	Liga II	15	1	0	0	—		—		15	1
1599 Șelimbăr	Total		40	3	1	0	—		—		41	3
Dinamo București	2024–25	Liga I	2	0	—		—		—		2	0
Dinamo București	2025–26	Liga I	0	0	0	0	—		—		0	0
Dinamo București	Total		2	0	0	0	—		—		2	0
CS Dinamo București (loan)	2025–26	Liga II	10	0	1	0	—		2 (Note: Appearances in Liga II relegation play-offs)	0	13	0
Career total			52	3	2	0	—		2	0	56	3
