= Valentin Dumitrache =

Romanian footballer

Personal information
- Full name: Valentin Laurențiu Dumitrache
- Date of birth: 29 March 2003 (age 23)
- Place of birth: Buzău, Romania
- Height: 1.79 m (5 ft 10 in)
- Position: Forward

Team information
- Current team: Chindia Târgoviște
- Number: 94

Youth career
- –2021: LPS Buzău

Senior career*
Years	Team	Apps	(Gls)
2021–2022	Academica Clinceni	32	(0)
2022–2024	Farul Constanța	2	(0)
2023–2024	→ Gloria Buzău (loan)	25	(4)
2024–2026	Dinamo București	0	(0)
2024–2025	→ Afumați (loan)	19	(6)
2025–2026	→ Metalul Buzău (loan)	25	(6)
2026–	Chindia Târgoviște	5	(0)

International career
2023	Romania U20	2	(0)
- * Club domestic league appearances and goals as of 31 October 2026

Valentin Laurențiu Dumitrache (born 29 March 2003) is a Romanian professional footballer who plays as a forward for Liga II club Chindia Târgoviște.

== Club career ==
=== Academica Clinceni ===
He made his league debut on 16 July 2021 in Liga I match against Sepsi OSK.

== Career statistics ==
As of match played 31 October 2026

Appearances and goals by club, season and competition
Club	Season	League			Cupa României		Europe		Other		Total	
Club	Season	Division	Apps	Goals	Apps	Goals	Apps	Goals	Apps	Goals	Apps	Goals
Academica Clinceni	2021–22	Liga I	32	0	1	0	—		—		33	0
Farul Constanța	2022–23	Liga I	0	0	1	0	—		—		1	0
Farul Constanța	2023–24	Liga I	2	0	0	0	0	0	1 (Note: Appearance in Supercupa României)	0	3	0
Farul Constanța	Total		2	0	1	0	0	0	1	0	4	0
Gloria Buzău (loan)	2023–24	Liga II	25	4	4	3	—		—		29	7
Afumați (loan)	2024–25	Liga II	19	6	3	1	—		—		22	7
Metalul Buzău (loan)	2025–26	Liga II	25	6	4	2	—		—		29	8
Chindia Târgoviște	2026–27	Liga II	5	0	3	2	—		—		8	2
Career total			108	16	16	8	0	0	1	0	125	24

== Honours ==
Farul Constanța

- Liga I: 2022–23
- Supercupa României runner-up: 2023
