= Adrian Caragea =

Romanian footballer (born 2005)

Personal information
- Full name: Adrian Iulian Caragea
- Date of birth: 7 September 2005 (age 21)
- Place of birth: Jaén, Spain
- Height: 1.82 m (6 ft 0 in)
- Position: Winger

Team information
- Current team: PAOK B
- Number: 36

Youth career
- Jaén
- Șoimii Buzău
- –2016: Viitorul Buzău
- 2016–2021: Gheorghe Hagi Academy
- 2021–2024: Sassuolo

Senior career*
Years	Team	Apps	(Gls)
2024–2026	Dinamo București	29	(0)
2026–	PAOK B	3	(0)

International career^{‡}
2019	Romania U15	4	(4)
2020–2021	Romania U16	8	(9)
2021	Romania U17	4	(3)
2023	Romania U18	2	(0)
2024	Romania U19	3	(0)
2024–2025	Romania U20	4	(0)
- * Club domestic league appearances and goals as of 27 September 2026 ‡ National team caps and goals as of 17 November 2025

Adrian Iulian Caragea (born 7 September 2005) is a Romanian professional footballer who plays as a winger for Super League Greece 2 club PAOK B.

== Career statistics ==
As of 27 September 2026

Appearances and goals by club, season and competition
Club	Season	League			Cupa României		Europe		Other		Total	
Club	Season	Division	Apps	Goals	Apps	Goals	Apps	Goals	Apps	Goals	Apps	Goals
Dinamo București	2024–25	Liga I	14	0	2	0	—		—		16	0
Dinamo București	2025–26	Liga I	15	0	3	2	—		1 (Note: Appearances in Liga I European play-offs)	0	19	2
Dinamo București	Total		29	0	5	2	—		1	0	35	2
PAOK B	2026–27	Super League Greece 2	3	0	—		—		—		3	0
Career total			32	0	5	2	—		1	0	38	2
