= Josué Homawoo =

Togolese footballer (born 1997)

Personal information
- Date of birth: 12 November 1997 (age 28)
- Place of birth: Lomé, Togo
- Height: 1.91 m (6 ft 3 in)
- Position: Defender

Team information
- Current team: Standard Liège
- Number: 24

Youth career
- Elan Sportif Lyon
- Lyon
- Saint-Priest
- –2015: Nantes

Senior career*
Years	Team	Apps	(Gls)
2015–2020	Nantes B	30	(2)
2019–2020	Nantes	1	(0)
2020–2021	Lorient B	2	(0)
2021–2023	Red Star	30	(0)
2023–2025	Dinamo București	58	(1)
2025–	Standard Liège	30	(0)

International career^{‡}
2024–	Togo	3	(0)
- * Club domestic league appearances and goals as of 31 May 2026 ‡ National team caps and goals as of 25 March 2025

Josué Homawoo (born 12 November 1997) is a Togolese professional footballer who plays as a defender for Belgian Pro League club Standard Liège and the Togo national team.

== Career ==
Born in Togo, Homawoo moved to France at the age of five and a half and began playing football there. A youth product of Elan Sportif Lyon, Lyon, Saint-Priest, he joined the reserves of FC Nantes in 2015. On 6 June 2017, Homawoo signed his first professional contract with Nantes. He made his professional debut with FC Nantes in a 3–3 Ligue 1 tie with Dijon FCO on 8 February 2020.

He moved to Lorient reserves on 2 October 2020. He then transferred Championnat National club Red Star in June 2021.

On 16 July 2023, it was announced that Homawoo signed a contract with Dinamo București. He made his debut for the team on 14 August 2023, playing 90 minutes in the 1–0 victory against FC Botoșani. For his performance in the match, he was selected in the Liga I Team of the Week. On 18 February 2024, Homawoo obtained a penalty in the 3-1 home win against Oțelul Galați and he was named for the second time in the season in the Liga I Team of the Week.

On 1 July 2025, he signed a two-year contract with Belgian club Standard Liège.

== Career statistics ==
=== International ===
As of match played 25 March 2025

Appearances and goals by national team and year
National team	Year	Apps	Goals
Togo
Togo	2024	1	0
Togo	2025	2	0
Total		3	0
