= Petru Neagu =

Moldovan footballer (born 1999)

Personal information
- Full name: Petru Neagu
- Date of birth: 13 August 1999 (age 27)
- Place of birth: Cimișlia, Moldova
- Height: 1.85 m (6 ft 1 in)
- Position: Winger

Team information
- Current team: Bălți
- Number: 21

Youth career
- –2017: A.S.D. Polisportiva Rapid Torino
- 2017: ASD Atletico Torino
- 2017–2018: Zimbru Chișinău

Senior career*
Years	Team	Apps	(Gls)
2018–2022	Zimbru Chișinău	68	(5)
2022–2023	Bălți	38	(6)
2024–2025	Dinamo București	9	(1)
2025	→ Unirea Slobozia (loan)	7	(0)
2025–	Bălți	11	(0)

International career
2017	Moldova U19	3	(1)
2019	Moldova U21	2	(0)
- * Club domestic league appearances and goals as of 1 June 2026

Petru Neagu (born 13 August 1999) is a Moldovan professional footballer who plays as a winger for Moldovan Liga club Bălți.

== Club career ==
=== Zimbru Chișinău ===
After a season with the Italian team Atletico Torino at the junior level, Petru debuted in the Moldovan Super League for the Zimbru Chisinau team on 1 September 2018, in the match lost 3–0 away to FC Dinamo-Auto Tiraspol. In the almost 4 seasons spent with this team, Petru played in 68 games and scored 5 goals.

=== CSF Bălți ===
On April 16, 2022, he transferred to the CSF Bălți team, for which he played for 3 seasons. Petru played in 38 matches and scored 6 goals.

=== Dinamo București ===
On January 17, 2024, as a player free of contract, he signed with Dinamo București. He made his debut for the team on 27 January, coming in as a substitute for Gonçalo Gregório in the 1–2 home against Rapid București. He made 4 appearances for a total of 47 minutes during the 2023–24 season.

He scored his first goal for the club on 27 July, in the 1–1 away draw against Sepsi, after coming on a substitute for Dennis Politic. For this performance, he was selected as Man of the Match.

== Career statistics ==
=== Club ===
As of match played 28 March 2025

Appearances and goals by club, season and competition
Club	Season	League			National Cup		Other		Total	
Club	Season	Division	Apps	Goals	Apps	Goals	Apps	Goals	Apps	Goals
Zimbru Chișinău	2018	Divizia Națională	7	0	3	0	–		10	0
Zimbru Chișinău	2019	Divizia Națională	15	1	1	0	–		16	1
Zimbru Chișinău	2020–21	Divizia Națională	31	3	0	0	–		31	3
Zimbru Chișinău	2021–22	Divizia Națională	15	1	0	0	–		15	1
Zimbru Chișinău	Total		68	5	4	0	—		72	5
FC Bălți	2021–22	Super Liga	5	1	1	0	–		6	1
FC Bălți	2022–23	Super Liga	20	0	4	2	–		24	2
FC Bălți	2023–24	Super Liga	13	5	0	0	–		13	5
FC Bălți	Total		38	6	5	2	—		43	7
Dinamo București	2023–24	Liga I	4	0	–		1 (Note: Appearance in Liga I promotion/relegation play-offs)	0	5	0
Dinamo București	2024–25	Liga I	5	1	2	0	–		7	1
Dinamo București	Total		9	1	2	0	1	0	12	1
Unirea Slobozia (loan)	2024–25	Liga I	7	0	–		–		7	0
Career Total			122	12	11	2	1	0	134	14

== Honours ==
Zimbru Chișinău

- Cupa Moldovei runner-up: 2017–18

FC Bălți

- Cupa Moldovei runner-up: 2022–23
