= Dennis Politic =

Romanian footballer (born 2000)

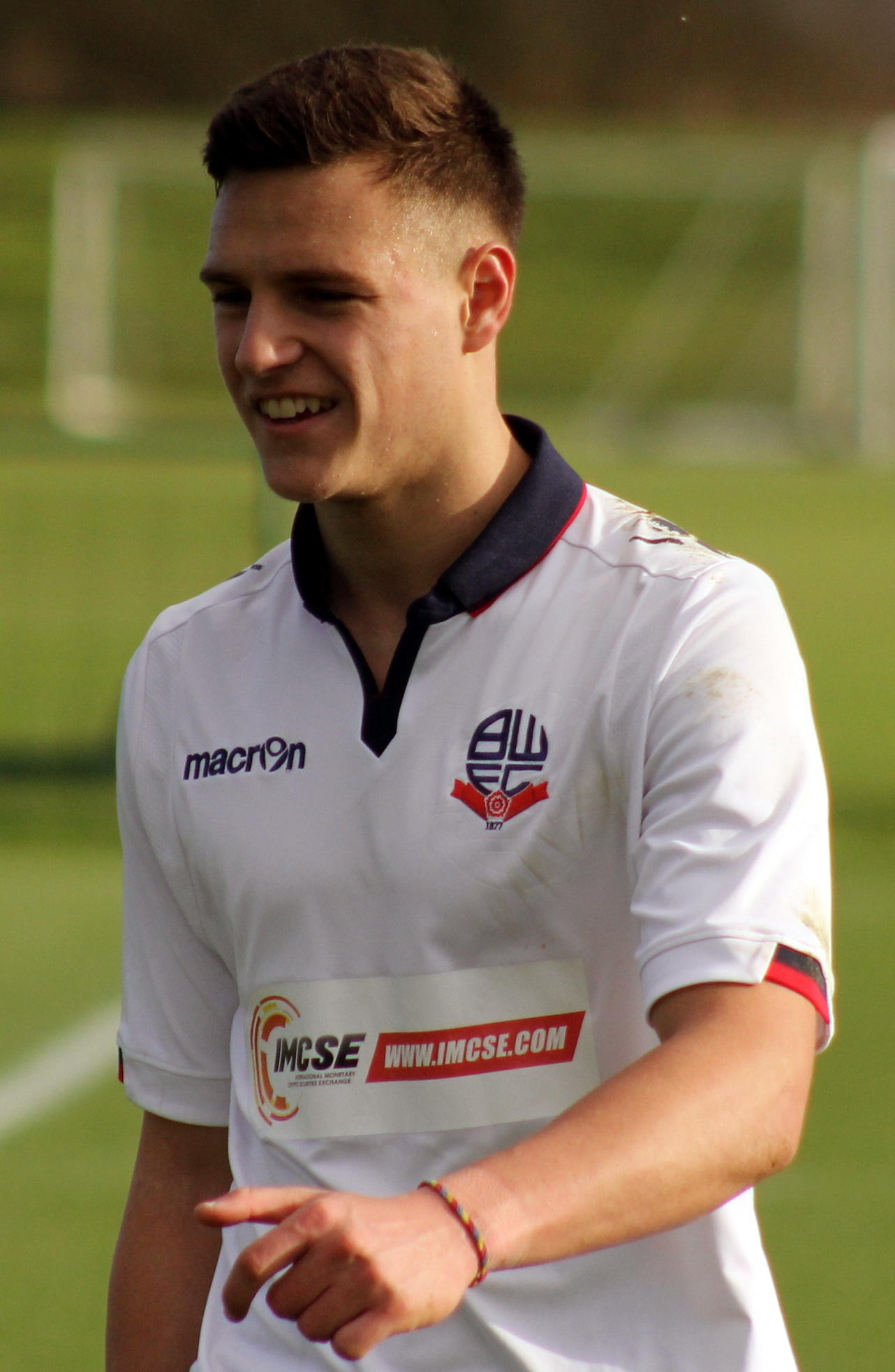
- Politic with Bolton Wanderers U18 in 2017

Personal information
- Full name: Dennis Dorian Politic
- Date of birth: 5 March 2000 (age 26)
- Place of birth: Codlea, Romania
- Height: 1.85 m (6 ft 1 in)
- Position: Winger

Team information
- Current team: FCSB
- Number: 20

Youth career
- CSM Codlea
- –2012: FC Brașov
- 2012–2015: Manchester United
- 2015–2018: Bolton Wanderers

Senior career*
Years	Team	Apps	(Gls)
2018–2022	Bolton Wanderers	24	(3)
2018–2019	→ Salford City (loan)	9	(2)
2021–2022	→ Port Vale (loan)	10	(2)
2022–2023	Cremonese	3	(0)
2022–2023	→ Port Vale (loan)	24	(2)
2023–2025	Dinamo București	56	(12)
2025–	FCSB	19	(2)
2026	→ Hermannstadt (loan)	6	(0)

International career^{‡}
2016	Romania U17	3	(0)
2025–	Romania	1	(0)
- * Club domestic league appearances and goals as of 7 November 2026 ‡ National team caps and goals as of 24 March 2025

Dennis Dorian Politic (born 5 March 2000) is a Romanian professional footballer who plays as a winger for Liga I club FCSB.

Politic moved to England at age 12, joining the academy of Manchester United from FC Brașov. He later signed with Bolton Wanderers, making his professional debut in 2018, following a loan at Salford City, and also spent time on loan at Port Vale. In 2022, he transferred to Italian side Cremonese, but soon returned to Port Vale on loan. Politic moved back to Romania in 2023 to join Dinamo București, and transferred to rivals FCSB two years later. He joined Hermannstadt on loan in February 2026.

Internationally, Politic made his debut for Romania in March 2025, appearing in a 5–1 away victory over San Marino during the 2026 FIFA World Cup qualifiers.

== Club career ==
=== Early career ===
Born in Codlea, Brașov County, Politic began his youth career with CSM Codlea and FC Brașov before joining Manchester United in August 2012, aged 12. He was also monitored by Liverpool and Chelsea, and his parents quit their jobs at the local fire station to move to England and support his development.

=== Bolton Wanderers ===
Politic joined Bolton Wanderers at the age of 15, where he scored hat-tricks in consecutive games for the under-19s in September and October 2017. He signed his first professional contract with the club in summer 2018, and on 26 October that year he was loaned to Salford City of the National League until the new year. He made his senior debut the next day in a 1–1 draw with Ebbsfleet United at Moor Lane, as a 69th-minute substitute for Tom Walker, earning praise from manager Graham Alexander for his impact. He scored his first goal on 1 December as an early substitute in a 3–0 home win against Havant & Waterlooville.

He totalled 13 appearances for the Ammies and scored once more on 16 February 2019, opening a 3–1 home loss to Dover Athletic. The long-range strike was likened to one scored by Salford co-owner David Beckham in 1996; Beckham was in attendance at the match. A shoulder injury caused him to miss out on Salford's successful promotion push that took them into the English Football League at the end of the 2018–19 season.

On 3 August 2019, Politic made his Bolton debut by playing the full 90 minutes in their opening game of the League One season, a 2–0 loss at Wycombe Wanderers; the Trotters team had an unfamiliar line-up due to a financial crisis. Ten days later he scored his first goal for the club, in a 5–2 loss at Rochdale in the first round of the EFL Cup. On 1 January 2020, he came on in the 76th-minute for Joe Dodoo and eight minutes later scored his first league goal in a 4–3 loss to Burton Albion at the University of Bolton Stadium. Later that month he signed a contract extension to keep him at Bolton until 2022, after which manager Keith Hill praised him for continuing to work hard.

On 11 August 2020, in a 6–0 pre-season victory against Loughborough University, Politic damaged his anterior cruciate ligament following a slip on the pitch and was ruled out for the whole of the 2020–21 season after undergoing a "pretty straightforward operation". He returned to training in April 2021, though manager Ian Evatt decided against playing him in the final few matches of the season, stating it was too risky to do so and would instead wait until the 2021–22 season.

On 16 August 2021, Politic joined League Two club Port Vale on loan for the 2021–22 season, to allow him to regain his prior fitness and develop as a player having missed the entire previous season through injury. Bolton had the option to recall him in January. They offered him a new contract though he did not sign it. Port Vale manager Darrell Clarke said that he had wanted an aggressive ball-carrying wide player and "he fits the criteria massively" despite being right-footed as that "in an ideal world I’d have gotten a left-footed one" He remained an unused substitute in the early stages of the season as Clarke used a 3–5–2 formation, but he did score a brace in a friendly game. He finally made his competitive debut for the "Valiants" on 2 October, coming on against Leyton Orient as a substitute with three minutes remaining, during which he scored the equalising goal as his team went on to win the game 3–2.

On 4 December, he scored his first career FA Cup goals; after coming on as a substitute in the 74th minute for David Amoo, Politic scored the equaliser and winner to secure a 2–1 victory over Burton Albion. Bolton manager Ian Evatt stated later that week that he would not be recalling Politic in January as he had not played enough for Port Vale to justify bringing him back, feeling that if he failed to get into a League Two team regularly, he should not get into a League One team either. He was recalled from his loan spell on 17 January, however, amidst reports that a permanent transfer had been arranged with Bolton confirming they had accepted a transfer bid for him.

=== Cremonese ===
On 21 January 2022, Politic signed for Serie B side Cremonese on an 18-month contract for an undisclosed fee plus a sell-on clause; the fee was reported by The Bolton News to be £50,000. He made his debut on 22 February as a late substitute in a 0–0 draw with Vicenza at the Stadio Giovanni Zini. Manager Fabio Pecchia led the "Tigers" to promotion into Serie A at the end of the 2021–22 season, though Politic made just three substitute appearances.

On 1 September 2022, he rejoined Port Vale on a season-long loan, with the club now playing in League One. He thanked manager Darrell Clarke for saving a winner's medal from the League Two play-off final for him, saying "I think from the top, all the way down, this is a special club and I think it’s run very well, the people are unbelievable – great characters in this club". He scored his first career hat-trick on 20 September, helping the Vale to a 4–0 victory at Shrewsbury Town in the EFL Trophy. He scored another goal in the FA Cup defeat to Exeter City on 5 November, in what was his first start in three weeks. He was sent off on 10 April after elbowing Oxford United's Stephan Negru in stoppage-time of a 0–0 draw.

=== Dinamo București ===
On 3 July 2023, he signed with Liga 1 club Dinamo București, his first experience with professional football in his native country. He made his debut for the club on 22 July, coming in as a substitute in the 59th-minute of the 2–1 loss to FCSB in the Eternal derby. On 5 August, he scored his first goal for the club, in a 1–1 draw at Universitatea Cluj and was also selected as man of the match. Nine days later, he contributed to a last-minute own goal in a 1–0 win against FC Botoșani and was named as man of the match and in the Liga 1 Team of the Week.

After a few unremarkable performances, on 6 October, he scored the only goal of Dinamo in a 2–1 loss at UTA Arad. Putting end to a series of 14 games without a win for Dinamo, Politic was named as man of the match in the 2–0 win at FC Botoșani, after scoring what was described as one of the most beautiful goals in the Liga 1 season. For this performance, he was also named in the Liga 1 Team of the Week. Politic became one of the most important players in the team and, on 2 February 2024, he scored in the 2–1 defeat at FC U Craiova. He scored again in the following game, on 12 February, against champions Farul Constanța, being named for the third time in the season in the Liga 1 Team of the Week. On 18 February, Politic extended his scoring run to three consecutive matches, opening the score in a 3–1 home win over Oțelul Galați, before being substituted in the 53rd-minute because of an injury. On 20 May, he scored a brace in the 2–0 win against Csíkszereda, in the decisive relegation play-off game, helping Dinamo to stay in Liga 1.

Politic started the 2024–25 season as team captain. On 21 July, he scored a penalty in the 4–1 home win over Petrolul. On 2 August, he scored twice in another 4–1 home win, against Gloria Buzău. For this, he was named as man of the match. and part of the Liga 1 Team of the Week. He ended the campaign with six goals in 27 games.

=== FCSB ===
On 6 June 2025, FCSB owner Gigi Becali confirmed the signing of Dennis Politic from cross-town rivals Dinamo București for €800,000, with Alexandru Musi also moving in the opposite direction. Politic made his debut on 5 July 2025 in the Supercupa României, coming on at half‑time and opening the score three minutes later with a long‑range shot; FCSB won 2–1 over CFR Cluj, and he was named man of the match. On 5 February 2026, he joined Hermannstadt on loan.

== International career ==
In October 2016, Politic earned three caps for the Romania U17 team during the qualification phase for the 2017 UEFA European Under-17 Championship, featuring in defeats against Austria, England, and Azerbaijan at Stadionul CNAF. Notably, he missed a penalty in the match versus England.

He made his senior debut for Romania on 24 March 2025, coming on during a 5–1 victory over San Marino in the 2026 FIFA World Cup qualifiers.

== Style of play ==
During his time in England, Politic was described as a "technically gifted" midfielder, known for his "velvet-like first touch" and "eye for the spectacular strike". His Bolton manager Phil Parkinson also praised him as a "creative maverick".

== Career statistics ==
=== Club ===
As of match played 7 November 2026

Appearances and goals by club, season and competition
Club	Season	League			National cup (Note: Includes FA Cup, Coppa Italia, Cupa României)		League cup (Note: Includes EFL Cup)		Europe		Other		Total	
Club	Season	Division	Apps	Goals	App	Goals	Apps	Goals	Apps	Goals	Apps	Goals	Apps	Goals
Bolton Wanderers	2018–19	Championship	0	0	0	0	0	0	—		—		0	0
Bolton Wanderers	2019–20	League One	24	3	1	0	1	1	—		4 (Note: Appearances in EFL Trophy)	1	30	5
Bolton Wanderers	2020–21	League Two	0	0	0	0	0	0	—		0	0	0	0
Bolton Wanderers	2021–22	League One	0	0	0	0	0	0	—		0	0	0	0
Bolton Wanderers	Total		24	3	1	0	1	1	—		4	1	30	5
Salford City (loan)	2018–19	National League	9	2	2	0	—		—		2 (Note: Appearances in FA Trophy)	0	13	2
Port Vale (loan)	2021–22	League Two	10	2	3	2	0	0	—		3	1	16	5
Cremonese	2021–22	Serie B	3	0	—		—		—		—		3	0
Cremonese	2022–23	Serie A	0	0	0	0	—		—		—		0	0
Cremonese	Total		3	0	0	0	—		—		—		3	0
Port Vale (loan)	2022–23	League One	24	2	1	1	0	0	—		4	4	29	7
Dinamo București	2023–24	Liga I	30	6	4	0	—		—		2 (Note: Appearances in Liga I promotion/relegation play-offs)	2	36	8
Dinamo București	2024–25	Liga I	26	6	1	0	—		—		—		27	6
Dinamo București	Total		56	12	5	0	0	0	—		2	2	63	14
FCSB	2025–26	Liga I	9	1	1	0	—		13 (Note: Three appearances in UEFA Champions League, ten appearances and one goal in UEFA Europa League)	1	1 (Note: Appearance in Supercupa României)	1	24	3
FCSB	2026–27	Liga I	10	1	1	0	—		1 (Note: Appearance in UEFA Conference League)	0	—		12	1
FCSB	Total		19	2	2	0	0	0	14	1	1	1	36	4
Hermannstadt (loan)	2025–26	Liga I	6	0	2	0	—		—		0	0	8	0
Career total			151	23	16	3	1	1	14	1	16	9	198	37

=== International ===
As of match played 24 March 2025

Appearances and goals by national team and year
National team	Year	Apps	Goals
Romania	2025	1	0
Total		1	0

== Honours ==
FCSB

- Supercupa României: 2025
