= List of Romanian football transfers winter 2024–25 =

This is a list of Romanian football transfers for the 2024–25 winter transfer window. Only transfers featuring SuperLiga are listed.

== SuperLiga ==
Note: Flags indicate national team as has been defined under FIFA eligibility rules. Players may hold more than one non-FIFA nationality.

=== FCSB ===
In:

No.	Pos.	Nation	Player
23	DF	ROU	Ionuț Cercel (from Farul Constanța)
31	MF	ITA	Juri Cisotti (from Oțelul Galați)
38	GK	CZE	Lukáš Zima (from Petrolul Ploiești)
39	FW	FRA	Jordan Gele (from Unirea Slobozia)
77	FW	ROU	Andrei Gheorghiță (on loan from Politehnica Iași)
90	FW	ROU	Alexandru Stoian (from Farul Constanța)

Out:

No.	Pos.	Nation	Player
3	DF	ROU	Ionuț Panțîru (to Voluntari)
19	FW	ROU	Daniel Popa (to (Turkey) Gençlerbirliği)
70	FW	BRA	Luis Phelipe (to (Moldova) Sheriff Tiraspol)
99	GK	ROU	Andrei Vlad (to (Kazakhstan) Aktobe)

=== CFR Cluj ===
In:

No.	Pos.	Nation	Player
6	DF	GAM	Sheriff Sinyan (from (Norway) Odd)
18	MF	KOS	Lindon Emërllahu (from (Kosovo) Ballkani)
20	DF	ROU	Alexandru Țîrlea (from (Spain) Gimnàstic)
25	MF	SEN	Moustapha Name (on loan from (Cyprus) Pafos)
30	GK	ROU	Alexandru Borbei (on loan from (Italy) Lecce)
97	FW	ROU	Andres Șfaiț (from (Italy) Salernitana)
99	FW	BIH	Stipe Jurić (from Oțelul Galați)

Out:

No.	Pos.	Nation	Player
8	MF	ROU	Robert Filip (on loan to Botoșani)
14	FW	CIV	Valentin Serebe (on loan to (Kosovo) Ballkani)
18	MF	CIV	Kader Keïta (on loan to Rapid București)
19	DF	ROU	Vasile Mogoș (to Universitatea Craiova)
22	DF	UKR	Alan Aussi (to (Luxembourg) F91 Dudelange)
26	MF	ROU	Andrei Artean (to Universitatea Cluj)
33	FW	GHA	Emmanuel Mensah (on loan to Argeș Pitești)
42	DF	SVN	Matija Boben (on loan to Politehnica Iași)
44	DF	CRO	Anton Krešić (on loan to (Croatia) Gorica)
70	MF	ROU	Tudor Lucaci (to CSM Olimpia)
83	GK	ROU	Mihai Răcășan (on loan to CSM Slatina)
86	MF	ROU	Viktor Kun (on loan to Unirea Dej)
99	FW	NGA	Peter Michael (on loan to (Israel) Ironi Tiberias)
—	DF	ROU	Dominik Șoptirean (on loan to Unirea Ungheni, previously on loan at Unirea Dej)
—	MF	ROU	Alin Ferenți (on loan to SR Brașov, previously on loan at CSM Olimpia)
—	MF	ROU	Luca Mihai (on loan to Gloria Buzău, previously on loan at Politehnica Iași)

=== Universitatea Craiova ===
In:

No.	Pos.	Nation	Player
3	DF	HON	Denil Maldonado (from (Honduras) Motagua, previously on loan)
9	FW	BRA	Alisson Safira (on loan from (Portugal) Santa Clara)
19	DF	ROU	Vasile Mogoș (from CFR Cluj)
41	DF	ROU	Marcus Păcurar (free agent)

Out:

No.	Pos.	Nation	Player
2	DF	ROU	Ștefan Vlădoiu (to (Ukraine) Kolos Kovalivka)
9	FW	ROU	Andrei Ivan (on loan to (Turkey) Adanaspor)
19	FW	BIH	Elvir Koljić (to Rapid București)
25	DF	ESP	Grego Sierra (to (Spain) Burgos)
37	FW	ROU	Marian Danciu (to UTA Arad)
—	FW	ROU	Jovan Marković (on loan to Oțelul Galați, previously on loan at Hermannstadt)
—	MF	ROU	Alexandru Cîmpanu (to Botoșani, previously on loan at UTA Arad)

=== Farul Constanța ===
In:

No.	Pos.	Nation	Player
2	DF	POR	Fabinho (from (Portugal) Mafra)
3	DF	BRA	Reginaldo (from (Brazil) Barcelona)
45	DF	BRA	João Ferreira (from (Brazil) Retrô)
97	FW	UKR	Daniel Kivinda (free agent)
—	FW	BRA	Isaque Ferreira (from (Brazil) Retrô)

Out:

No.	Pos.	Nation	Player
2	DF	ROU	Ionuț Cercel (to FCSB)
9	FW	BRA	Rivaldinho (to (China) Qingdao Red Lions)
13	DF	ROU	Mario Aioanei (on loan to CSM Olimpia)
15	DF	ROU	Gabriel Dănuleasă (on loan to Afumați)
19	FW	ROU	Robert Mustacă (to CSM Olimpia)
90	FW	ROU	Alexandru Stoian (to FCSB)
—	DF	ROU	Darius Grosu (on loan to Metalul Buzău, previously on loan at Gloria Buzău)
—	DF	ROU	Bogdan Lazăr (to MSE Târgu Mureș, previously on loan at CSU Alba Iulia)
—	DF	ROU	Alexandru Georgescu (to Dunărea Călărași, previously on loan at Cetatea)
—	MF	ROU	Cătălin Tronea (to Viitorul Onești, previously on loan at CSU Alba Iulia)

=== Sepsi OSK ===
In:

No.	Pos.	Nation	Player
8	MF	CRO	Dino Skorup (from (Bosnia and Herzegovina) Borac Banja Luka)
12	FW	MKD	Dorian Babunski (from (Switzerland) Grasshoppers)
19	MF	ROU	Giovani Ghimfuș (from Concordia Chiajna)
24	DF	CRO	Matej Šimić (from (Bulgaria) Krumovgrad)
26	FW	ROU	Sebastian Mailat (from (South Korea) Suwon Samsung Bluewings)
44	DF	HUN	Márk Tamás (from (Azerbaijan) Neftçi)

Out:

No.	Pos.	Nation	Player
1	GK	ROU	Dinu Moldovan (free agent)
8	MF	NED	Michael Breij (to (Netherlands) Roda JC)
13	DF	ROU	Denis Ciobotariu (to Rapid București)
14	DF	SRB	Stefan Hajdin (to (Serbia) Čukarički)
21	MF	MKD	Isnik Alimi (to (China) Dalian Yingbo)
55	DF	ISR	Nir Bardea (to (Israel) Hapoel Hadera)
91	DF	HUN	Krisztián Dobozi (free agent)

=== Rapid București ===
In:

No.	Pos.	Nation	Player
1	GK	AUT	Franz Stolz (on loan from (Italy) Genoa)
13	DF	ROU	Denis Ciobotariu (from Sepsi OSK)
18	MF	CIV	Kader Keïta (on loan from CFR Cluj)
29	MF	ROU	Alex Dobre (free agent)
30	FW	NGA	David Ankeye (on loan from (Italy) Genoa)
69	MF	NGA	Peter Ademo (on loan from (Moldova) Sheriff Tiraspol)
95	FW	BIH	Elvir Koljić (from Universitatea Craiova)
—	GK	ROU	Dinu Moldovan (free agent)

Out:

No.	Pos.	Nation	Player
1	GK	SUI	Benjamin Siegrist (on loan to (Italy) Genoa)
6	DF	ROU	Paul Iacob (on loan to Botoșani)
8	MF	KOS	Florent Hasani (to (Turkey) Boluspor)
18	FW	SVK	Timotej Jambor (on loan to (Slovakia) Žilina)
36	DF	SVK	Filip Blažek (on loan to Unirea Slobozia)
45	FW	GAB	Aaron Boupendza (to (China) Zhejiang)
99	GK	ROU	Bogdan Ungureanu (on loan to Corvinul Hunedoara)
—	MF	ROU	Rareș Stanciu (on loan to Progresul Spartac, previously on loan at Tunari)
—	MF	ROU	Eduard Dănilă (on loan to Câmpulung Muscel, previously on loan at Mioveni)
—	FW	ROU	Alexandru Stan (on loan to Oțelul Galați, previously on loan at Gloria Buzău)

=== UTA Arad ===
In:

No.	Pos.	Nation	Player
5	DF	SEN	Khadim Rassoul (free agent)
9	FW	ARG	Agustín Vuletich (free agent)
10	MF	CYP	Marinos Tzionis (on loan from (Serbia) Čukarički)
11	FW	ENG	Shayon Harrison (from Politehnica Iași)
28	FW	POR	Zé Pedro (free agent)
33	GK	ROU	Andrei Gorcea (from Universitatea Cluj)
37	FW	ROU	Marian Danciu (from Universitatea Craiova)
40	MF	COD	Paul-José M'Poku (from (South Korea) Incheon United)
62	GK	ROU	Patric Toderean (from CSM Olimpia)
99	FW	NGA	Effiong Nsungusi (from (Uzbekistan) Neftchi Fergana)

Out:

No.	Pos.	Nation	Player
1	GK	ROU	Robert Popa (loan return to FC U Craiova)
7	FW	ROU	Andrei Dumiter (on loan to Voluntari)
9	FW	NGA	Jordan Kadiri (free agent)
10	MF	SVK	Andrej Fábry (to Universitatea Cluj)
11	FW	NGA	Imoh Ezekiel (free agent)
12	GK	ROU	Aleksander Mitrović (free agent)
18	MF	ROU	Valentin Borcea (to Politehnica Iași)
28	FW	POR	Zé Pedro (free agent)
33	GK	ROU	Mario Popescu (free agent)
77	MF	ROU	Alexandru Cîmpanu (loan return to Universitatea Craiova)
—	MF	ROU	Ovidiu Bulza (to Gloria Lunca-Teuz Cermei)
—	MF	ROU	Răzvan Ristin (on loan to Progresul Pecica, previously on loan at Dumbrăvița)
—	FW	ROU	Ahmet Ekmekci (on loan to Progresul Pecica, previously on loan at Dumbrăvița)
—	FW	ROU	Paul Mercioiu (on loan to Progresul Pecica, previously on loan at Gloria Lunca-Teuz Cermei)

=== Oțelul Galați ===
In:

No.	Pos.	Nation	Player
3	DF	COL	Julián Bonilla (from (Portugal) Felgueiras)
4	DF	SUI	Martin Angha (free agent)
9	FW	ROU	Alexandru Stan (on loan from Rapid București, previously on loan at Gloria Buzău)
11	MF	ROU	Andreas Burcea (on loan from Concordia Chiajna)
16	DF	ROU	Alexandru Mitulețu (from Filiași)
22	MF	ROU	Andrei Bani (from Dinamo București)
34	MF	SVN	Jakob Novak (from (Kazakhstan) Atyrau)
55	MF	ROU	Eric Bicfalvi (from (Russia) Ural Yekaterinburg)
59	FW	ROU	Jovan Marković (on loan from Universitatea Craiova, previously on loan at Hermannstadt)
91	FW	ECU	Stiven Plaza (from (Mexico) Venados)

Out:

No.	Pos.	Nation	Player
3	DF	ROU	Valerio Gallo (to Afumați)
9	FW	BIH	Stipe Jurić (to CFR Cluj)
11	FW	ROU	Alexandru Pop (to Dinamo București)
12	GK	UKR	Maksym Kovalyov (to (Bulgaria) Spartak Varna)
15	DF	BFA	François Yabré (to Bihor Oradea)
22	DF	CRO	Josip Tomašević (to (Uzbekistan) Buxoro)
26	DF	ROU	Mihai Adăscăliței (to Politehnica Iași)
30	MF	ITA	Juri Cisotti (to FCSB)
33	MF	SRB	Vasilije Đurić (to (Bosnia and Herzegovina) Velež Mostar)
34	MF	SVN	Jakob Novak (on loan to (Kazakhstan) Zhenis)
71	MF	MDA	Victor Bogaciuc (to (Moldova) Petrocub Hîncești)

=== Hermannstadt ===
In:

No.	Pos.	Nation	Player

Out:

No.	Pos.	Nation	Player
16	FW	ROU	Jovan Marković (loan return to Universitatea Craiova)
33	MF	ROU	Alexandru Luca (on loan to 1599 Șelimbăr)
77	MF	ROU	Ronaldo Deaconu (to (Hungary) Nyíregyháza)

=== Universitatea Cluj ===
In:

No.	Pos.	Nation	Player
1	GK	ROU	Ștefan Lefter (from Corvinul Hunedoara)
13	MF	SVK	Andrej Fábry (from UTA Arad)
18	MF	ROU	Andrei Artean (from CFR Cluj)
19	FW	CIV	Issouf Macalou (from (France) Sochaux)

Out:

No.	Pos.	Nation	Player
13	FW	CMR	Franck Tchassem (on loan to Argeș Pitești)
21	MF	ROU	Mario Șfaiț (on loan to SCM Zalău)
33	GK	ROU	Andrei Gorcea (to UTA Arad)
99	FW	CPV	Hildeberto Pereira (free agent)

=== Petrolul Ploiești ===
In:

No.	Pos.	Nation	Player
11	FW	ROU	Valentin Gheorghe (from Politehnica Iași)
29	DF	GER	Kilian Ludewig (free agent)
34	GK	SWE	Oscar Linnér (free agent)
77	FW	TUR	Ali Demirel (from (Turkey) Kasımpaşa)

Out:

No.	Pos.	Nation	Player
11	FW	CGO	Herman Moussaki (free agent)
19	FW	ROU	Alexandru Tudorie (to (China) Wuhan Three Towns)
38	GK	CZE	Lukáš Zima (to FCSB)
71	FW	ROU	David Ilie (on loan to SR Brașov)
—	MF	ROU	Robert Enache (free agent, previously on loan at Focșani)

=== Politehnica Iași ===
In:

No.	Pos.	Nation	Player
2	DF	GHA	Mohammed Umar (free agent)
6	DF	SVN	Matija Boben (on loan from CFR Cluj)
8	MF	BRA	Dudu Nardini (from (Czech Republic) Jablonec)
9	FW	ALB	Xhuliano Skuka (from (Portugal) Penafiel)
11	FW	FRA	Adama Diakhaby (from (Turkey) Bandırmaspor)
13	DF	ROU	Cătălin Creț (from Sănătatea Cluj)
14	MF	ROU	Valentin Borcea (from UTA Arad)
19	FW	GUI	Sekou Camara (from Unirea Slobozia)
26	DF	ROU	Mihai Adăscăliței (from Oțelul Galați)
30	MF	ROU	Antonio Bordușanu (on loan from Dinamo București)
80	MF	ROU	Romario Moise (from Ceahlăul)
—	MF	ITA	Mursal Banse (from (Italy) Bassano)
—	FW	CPV	João Paulino (from (Moldova) Zimbru Chișinău)

Out:

No.	Pos.	Nation	Player
7	FW	POR	Gonçalo Teixeira (to (Kazakhstan) Zhenis)
8	MF	ROU	Luca Mihai (loan return to CFR Cluj)
9	FW	ENG	Shayon Harrison (to UTA Arad)
11	FW	ROU	Valentin Gheorghe (to Petrolul Ploiești)
14	MF	CRO	Robert Mišković (to (Czech Republic) Slovácko)
18	DF	ROU	Florin Ilie (free agent)
19	MF	ROU	Cătălin Itu (to (Bulgaria) Krumovgrad)
22	FW	ALB	Florian Kamberi (free agent)
30	DF	MKD	Todor Todoroski (free agent)
33	DF	MKD	David Atanaskoski (to (Albania) Partizani)
57	FW	ALG	Billel Omrani (free agent)
70	FW	ROU	David Popa (loan return to FCSB)
80	FW	ROU	Andrei Gheorghiță (on loan to FCSB)
—	MF	ROU	Alex Militaru (on loan to Politehnica Timișoara)
—	FW	CPV	João Paulino (on loan to (Kazakhstan) Ordabasy)
—	DF	ROU	Alexandru Core (to MSE Târgu Mureș, previously on loan at Mioveni)

=== Dinamo București ===
In:

No.	Pos.	Nation	Player
18	FW	CRO	Stipe Perica (from (Croatia) Rijeka)
22	MF	ROU	Casian Soare (from Șelimbăr)
80	DF	ESP	Antonio Luna (free agent)
99	FW	ROU	Alexandru Pop (from Oțelul Galați)

Out:

No.	Pos.	Nation	Player
18	FW	ESP	Alberto Soro (on loan to (Portugal) Chaves)
20	MF	ROU	Antonio Bordușanu (on loan to Politehnica Iași)
21	FW	MDA	Petru Neagu (on loan to Unirea Slobozia)
22	MF	ROU	Andrei Bani (to Oțelul Galați)
77	MF	ROU	Andrei Florescu (to Reșița)

=== Botoșani ===
In:

No.	Pos.	Nation	Player
8	MF	ROU	Robert Filip (on loan from CFR Cluj)
10	MF	ROU	Alexandru Cîmpanu (from Universitatea Craiova, previously on loan at UTA Arad)
15	DF	ROU	Damian Cimpoeșu (on loan from Sănătatea Cluj)
23	MF	ROU	Alexandru Albu (from (Saudi Arabia) Al-Safa)
66	DF	ROU	Paul Iacob (on loan from Rapid București)
67	MF	ALB	Enriko Papa (from (Albania) Laçi)
99	GK	GRE	Giannis Anestis (free agent)

Out:

No.	Pos.	Nation	Player
8	MF	ROU	Eduard Florescu (to (Kazakhstan) Elimai)
10	FW	ARG	Juan Cruz Kaprof (free agent)
21	MF	ARG	Chapi Romano (free agent)
80	MF	ROU	Lóránd Fülöp (to Csíkszereda)
94	GK	ROU	Eduard Pap (to Dumbrăvița)
—	DF	ROU	Răzvan Creț (on loan to Minaur, previously on loan at Focșani)
—	FW	ROU	Iulian Cărăușu (on loan to Bucovina Rădăuți, previously on loan at Tunari)

=== Unirea Slobozia ===
In:

No.	Pos.	Nation	Player
11	FW	SVK	Jakub Vojtuš (free agent)
14	DF	SVK	Filip Blažek (on loan from Rapid București)
16	FW	ROU	Marius Lupu (from Corvinul Hunedoara)
17	MF	RUS	Rasambek Akhmatov (on loan from Gloria Buzău)
27	FW	MDA	Petru Neagu (on loan from Dinamo București)
—	FW	GEO	Bachana Arabuli (from (South Korea) Gyeongnam)

Out:

No.	Pos.	Nation	Player
11	FW	FRA	Jordan Gele (to FCSB)
17	FW	GUI	Sekou Camara (to Politehnica Iași)

=== Gloria Buzău ===
In:

No.	Pos.	Nation	Player
3	DF	ESP	Israel Puerto (free agent)
4	MF	ROU	Luca Mihai (on loan from CFR Cluj, previously on loan at Politehnica Iași)
17	MF	CMR	James Léa Siliki (free agent)
19	MF	PER	Cristian Benavente (from (Peru) César Vallejo, previously on loan at (Peru) Sport Boys)
24	MF	LVA	Aleksejs Saveļjevs (from (Latvia) Auda)
42	FW	NED	Kevin Brobbey (from (Saudi Arabia) Al-Batin)

Out:

No.	Pos.	Nation	Player
5	MF	RUS	Rasambek Akhmatov (on loan to Unirea Slobozia)
19	FW	ROU	Alexandru Stan (loan return to Rapid București)
23	DF	ROU	Darius Grosu (loan return to Farul Constanța)
27	MF	CRO	Dario Čanađija (to (Kazakhstan) Ordabasy)
88	MF	ROU	Ion Gheorghe (free agent)

== See also ==
- 2024–25 Liga I
