= 2024–25 ASC Oțelul Galați season =

Oțelul Galați
2024–25 season
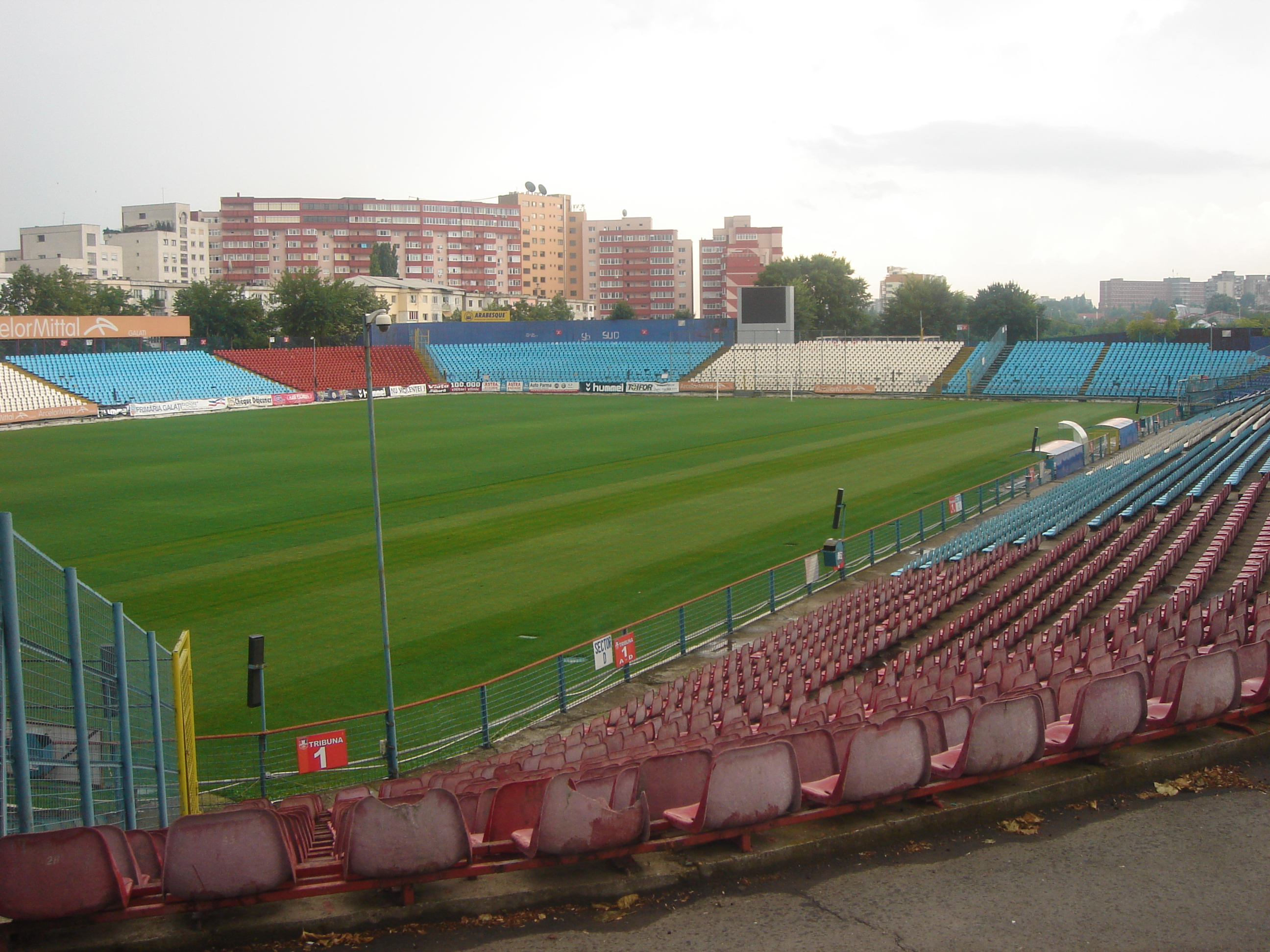
- Oțelul stadium is used as the season's home ground
- Chairman: Cristian Munteanu
- Head coach: Dorinel Munteanu (until 30 December); Ovidiu Burcă (1 January – 19 March); László Balint (from 19 March)
- Stadium: Oțelul
- Liga I: 8th
- Cupa României: Group stage
- Top goalscorer: League: Frédéric Maciel (6); All: Maciel; Răzvan Tănasă (6)
- Highest home attendance: 9,678 vs Dinamo București (20 September 2024)
- Lowest home attendance: 1,455 vs CFR Cluj (11 November 2024)
- Average home league attendance: 5,262
- Biggest win: Home: Oțelul Galați 2–0 Sepsi; Away: Sepsi 0–3 Oțelul Galați
- Biggest defeat: Home: Oțelul Galați 1–4 FCSB; Away: U Cluj 2–0 Oțelul Galați
Home colours	Away colours	Third colours
- All statistics correct as of 17 May 2025.

The 2024–25 season was Oțelul Galați's 29th season in Liga I, and the second consecutive season since last winning promotion at the end of the 2022–23 Liga II season. In addition to the Superliga, Oțelul participated in this season's edition of Cupa României.

In preparation for the upcoming season, Oțelul completed a training camp at Vatra Dornei from June 9th to 20th. The team also participated in a subsequent training camp in Austria, held between June 22nd and July 4th in Mönichkirchen.

== Kits ==
- Supplier: Adidas
- Sponsors: Liberty (front) / MrBit, Visit Galați (back) / CreditFix, Dramirom Trade (left sleeve) / Valgrig (right sleeve)

Home	Away	Third	Goalkeeper 1	Goalkeeper 2	Goalkeeper 3

== Overview ==
Oțelul ended the previous season by finishing 8th in the Liga I and reaching the Cupa României final, which was lost against Corvinul Hunedoara.

== Players ==
=== Transfers ===
==== In ====
No.	Pos.	Nat.	Name	Age	EU	Moving from	Type	Transfer window	Ends	Transfer fee	Source
32	GK	(Romania)	Iustin Popescu	30	EU	Chindia Târgoviște	Transfer	Summer	30 June 2026	Free	
23	CM	(Romania)	Cristian Chira	22	EU	CFR Cluj	Transfer	Summer	30 June 2025	Free	
20	CM	(Romania)	Neluț Roșu	30	EU	Dinamo București	Transfer	Summer	30 June 2026	Free	
9	CF	(Bosnia and Herzegovina)	Stipe Jurić	25	Non-EU	ŁKS Łódź (Poland)	Transfer	Summer	30 June 2025	Free	
33	CM	(Serbia)	Vasilije Đurić	25	Non-EU	Radnički Kragujevac (Serbia)	Transfer	Summer	30 June 2025	Free	
12	GK	(Ukraine)	Maksym Kovalyov	23	Non-EU	Pirin Blagoevgrad (Bulgaria)	Transfer	Summer	30 June 2025	Free	
97	ST	(Romania)	Albert Hofman	21	EU	Universitatea Cluj	Loaned-in	Summer	30 June 2025	Undisclosed	
5	CB	(Serbia)	Nikola Stevanović	25	Non-EU	Napredak Kruševac (Serbia)	Transfer	Summer	30 June 2025	Free	
3	RB	(Romania) (Italy)	Valerio Gallo	19	EU	Gloria Bistrița	Transfer	Summer	30 June 2026	Undisclosed	
27	RB	(Romania)	David Maftei	19	EU	Farul Constanța	Loaned-in	Summer	30 June 2025	Undisclosed	
22	LB	(Croatia)	Josip Tomašević	30	EU	Hapoel Hadera (Israel)	Transfer	Summer	30 June 2025	Undisclosed	
77	ST	(Romania)	Luca Andronache	21	EU	Farul Constanța	Transfer	Summer	30 June 2025	Undisclosed	
19	WI	(Moldova)	Maxim Cojocaru	26	Non-EU	Chindia Târgoviște	Transfer	Summer	30 June 2025	Free	
71	CM	(Moldova)	Victor Bogaciuc	24	Non-EU	Chindia Târgoviște	Transfer	Summer	30 June 2025	Free	
29	AM	(Belgium)	Samy Bourard	28	EU	Unattached	Transfer	Summer	30 June 2025	Free	
4	CB	(Switzerland)	Martin Angha	30	EU	Unattached	Transfer	Summer	30 June 2025	Free	
11	LM	(Romania)	Alexandru Burcea	19	EU	Concordia Chiajna	Loaned-in	Winter	30 June 2025	Undisclosed	
9	FW	(Romania)	Alex Stan	19	EU	Rapid București	Loaned-in	Winter	30 June 2025	Undisclosed	
22	RW	(Romania)	Andrei Bani	22	EU	Dinamo București	Transfer	Winter	30 June 2027	Undisclosed	
3	CB	(Colombia)	Julián Bonilla	28	EU	Felgueiras (Portugal)	Transfer	Winter	30 June 2028	Undisclosed	
34	CM	(Slovenia)	Jakob Novak	26	EU	Unattached	Transfer	Summer	30 June 2027	Free	
31	DM	(Croatia)	Diego Živulić	32	EU	Unattached	Transfer	Winter	30 June 2026	Free	
91	FW	(Ecuador)	Stiven Plaza	25	Non-EU	Unattached	Transfer	Winter	30 June 2025	Free	
55	AM	(Romania)	Eric Bicfalvi	37	EU	Unattached	Transfer	Winter	30 June 2026	Free	

==== Out ====
No.	Pos.	Nat.	Name	Age	EU	Moving to	Type	Transfer window	Transfer fee	Source
12	GK	(Romania)	Relu Stoian	28	EU	Universitatea Craiova	Contract ended	Summer		
25	CB	(Croatia)	Dragan Lovrić	28	EU	Gloria Buzău	Contract ended	Summer		
16	LB	(Romania)	Costin Ghiocel	30	EU	FC Argeș	Contract ended	Summer		
22	LB	(Romania)	Dan Panait	27	EU		Contract ended	Summer		
3	RB	(Romania)	Claudio Mocanu	19	EU		Contract ended	Summer		
23	DM	(Moldova)	Vasile Jardan	30	Non-EU	Petrocub Hîncești (Moldova)	Contract ended	Summer		
7	CF	(Romania)	George Cârjan	35	EU		Retired	Summer		
94	GK	(Romania)	Eduard Pap	29	EU	FC Botoșani	Contract ended	Summer		
27	CM	(Argentina)	Pablo Gaitán	32	Non-EU	Birkirkara (Malta)	Contract ended	Summer		
9	ST	(Serbia)	Anes Rušević	27	Non-EU	Zrinjski Mostar (Croatia)	Contract ended	Summer		
1	GK	(Romania)	Gabriel Ursu	22	EU	ACS Unirea Braniștea	Loaned out	Summer		
24	RW	(Romania)	Denis Bordun	18	EU	ACS Unirea Braniștea	Loaned out	Summer		
18	RB	(Romania)	Ștefan Farcaș	21	EU	Câmpulung Muscel	Loaned out	Summer		
33	CM	(Serbia)	Vasilije Đurić	26	Non-EU		Mutual	Winter		
12	GK	(Ukraine)	Maksym Kovalyov	23	Non-EU		Mutual	Winter		
11	CF	(Romania)	Alexandru Pop	24	EU	Dinamo București	Transfer	Winter	Undisclosed	
30	LW	(Italy)	Juri Cisotti	31	EU	FCSB	Transfer	Winter	Undisclosed	
9	CF	(Bosnia and Herzegovina)	Stipe Jurić	26	Non-EU		Mutual	Winter		
22	LB	(Croatia)	Josip Tomašević	30	EU		Mutual	Winter		
31	DM	(Croatia)	Diego Živulić	32	EU		Mutual	Winter		
26	RB	(Romania)	Mihai Adăscăliței	30	EU		Mutual	Winter		
15	CB	(Ivory Coast) (Burkina Faso)	François Yabré	33	Non-EU	FC Bihor	Transfer	Winter	Undisclosed	
3	RB	(Romania) (Italy)	Valerio Gallo	20	EU		Mutual	Winter		
71	CM	(Moldova)	Victor Bogaciuc	25	Non-EU		Mutual	Winter		
34	CM	(Slovenia)	Jakob Novak	27	EU	FC Zhenis (Kazakhstan)	Loaned out	Winter		

EU = if holds or not a European Union passport; Country: when 2 flags, 1st flag = country that plays for internationally, 2nd flag = country of birth; N = number on jersey; P = Position (for position name, pause mouse pointer on abbreviation); Name = Name on jersey (for more extensive name, pause mouse pointer on name); Age = age on the day of the signing; Moving from = only indicate the club the player was playing before start playing for this club in this season, for the type of the moving see Status column; Moving to = only indicates the club the player is going to play next, for the type of the moving see Status column; Ends = when the player's current contract ends; n/a = Not applicable.

== Player statistics ==
=== Squad statistics ===
				Total			Liga I		Cupa României	
No.	Pos.	Nat.	Name	Sts	App	Gls	App	Gls	App	Gls
2	RB	(Bulgaria)	Zhelev	16	19		17		2	
3	CB	(Colombia)	Julián Bonilla	2	4		4			
4	CB	(Switzerland)	Angha	13	15		13		2	
5	CB	(Serbia)	Stevanović	35	35	1	35	1		
6	CB	(Ivory Coast)	Cissé	28	29	1	28	1	1	
7	RW	(Portugal)	Maciel	37	41	6	38	6	3	
8	DM	(Romania)	Neagu		1		1			
9	CF	(Bosnia and Herzegovina)	Jurić	13	23	5	20	3	3	2
10	AM	(Belgium)	Bourard	11	20	2	19	1	1	1
11	CF	(Romania)	A. Pop	17	24	5	21	5	3	
11	LM	(Romania)	Alexandru Burcea		8		8			
13	GK	(Romania)	Dur-Bozoancă	16	16		14		2	
14	RB	(Romania)	Andrei Rus	4	8		8			
15	CB	(Burkina Faso)	Yabré	3	3	1			3	1
17	AM	(Romania)	Răzvan Tănasă	25	37	6	34	5	3	1
18	RB	(Romania)	Sțefan Farcaș		1		1			
18	CM	(Romania)	Radu Postelnicu		1		1			
19	WI	(Moldova)	Cojocaru	2	21		19		2	
20	CM	(Romania)	Roșu	6	20		19		1	
21	DM	(Portugal)	Teles	28	39	4	36	4	3	
22	LB	(Croatia)	Tomašević	11	11		9		2	
22	RW	(Romania)	Bani	6	10	1	10	1		
23	CM	(Romania)	Cristian Chira	1	4		4			
26	RB	(Romania)	Mihai Adăscăliței	8	19		18		1	
27	RB	(Romania)	Maftei	19	23		22		1	
28	LB	(Romania)	Miguel Silva	25	28	1	27	1	1	
30	LW	(Italy)	Cisotti	19	20	3	17	3	3	
31	DM	(Croatia)	Živulić	33	36	3	34	3	2	
32	GK	(Romania)	Popescu	26	26		25		1	
33	CM	(Serbia)	Đurić	8	17		16		1	
55	AM	(Romania)	Bicfalvi	8	9		9			
59	FW	(Romania)	Marković	2	7	1	7	1		
66	DM	(Portugal)	Lameira	34	38		35		3	
71	CM	(Moldova)	Bogaciuc	1	2				2	
77	ST	(Romania)	Andronache	1	11		10		1	
91	FW	(Ecuador)	Plaza		3		3			
97	RW	(Romania)	Hofman	3	12		12			
9	FW	(Romania)	Stan	1	7		7			

Last updated: 17 May 2025
Source: official website
Ordered by player name
0 shown as blank

=== Start formations ===
Qnt	Formation	Match(es)
38	4-3-3	
2	4-4-2	
1	5-4-1	
1	5-3-2	

Last updated: 17 May 2025
Source: Match reports in Matches
Only competitive matches.

== Club ==
=== Technical staff ===
Position	Staff
Head coach	(Romania) László Balint
Assistant coach	(Romania) Alin Pânzaru
Goalkeeping coach	(Romania) Iulian Olteanu
Club doctor	(Romania) Ionuț Băneșanu
Physical therapist	(Romania) Alexandru Popa
Physical trainer	(Romania) Alexandru Radu
Masseurs	(Romania) Costel Crăciun (Romania) Alexandru Petrișor Bălan
Storeman	(Romania) Cristian Bahnașu (Romania) Iulian Octavian Dogaru
Video analyst	(Romania) Nic Constandache

Last updated: 13 May 2025
Source: ascotelul.ro

== Competitions ==
=== Overall ===
	Total	Home	Away
Games played	42	20	22
Games won	14	5	9
Games drawn	13	9	4
Games lost	15	6	9
Biggest win	3–0 vs. Sepsi	2–0 vs. Sepsi	3–0 vs. Sepsi
Biggest loss	1–4 vs. FCSB	1–4 vs. FCSB	0–2 vs. U Cluj
Clean sheets	18	9	9
Goals scored	42	16	26
Goals conceded	41	18	23
Goal difference	1	-2	3
Average GF per game	1	0.8	1.18
Average GA per game	0.98	0.9	1.05
Yellow cards	74	29	45
Red cards	5	2	3
Most appearances	(Portugal) Maciel (41)		
Most minutes played	(Serbia) Stevanović (3327)		
Top scorer	Maciel, Răzvan Tănasă (6)		
Top assister	(Portugal) Maciel (10)		
Points	55/126 (43.65%)	24/60 (40%)	31/66 (46.97%)
Winning rate	33.33%	25%	40.91%

Last updated: 17 May 2025
Source: Matches

=== SuperLiga ===
==== League table ====
Pos	Team	Pld	W	D	L	GF	GA	GD	Pts	Advances
10	Farul Constanța	30	8	11	11	29	38	−9	35	Qualification for play-out round
11	UTA Arad	30	8	10	12	28	35	−7	34	Qualification for play-out round
12	Oțelul Galați	30	7	11	12	24	32	−8	32	Qualification for play-out round
13	Politehnica Iași	30	8	7	15	29	46	−17	31 (Note: Ranked on head-to-head points: Politehnica Iași (4); Botoșani (1).)	Qualification for play-out round
14	Botoșani	30	7	10	13	26	37	−11	31	Qualification for play-out round

Source: LPF (in Romanian)
Rules for classification: 1) Points; 2) Head-to-head points; 3) Head-to-head goal difference; 4) Head-to-head goals scored; 5) Goal difference; 6) Goals scored; 7) Play-off.

==== Results summary ====
Overall								Home						Away					
Pld	W	D	L	GF	GA	GD	Pts	W	D	L	GF	GA	GD	W	D	L	GF	GA	GD
39	13	12	14	37	37	0	51	5	8	6	16	18	−2	8	4	8	21	19	+2

Last updated: 17 May 2025.
Source: Matches

==== Results by round ====
Round	1	2	3	4	5	6	7	8	9	10	11	12	13	14	15	16	17	18	19	20	21	22	23	24	25	26	27	28	29	30	31	32	33	34	35	36	37	38	39
Ground	A	H	A	H	A	A	H	A	H	A	H	A	H	A	H	H	A	H	A	H	A	H	A	H	A	H	A	H	A	H	A	A	H	A	H	A	H	A	H
Result	W	D	W	W	D	D	W	D	D	D	D	L	L	L	D	L	W	L	L	D	L	D	L	W	L	D	L	L	W	L	L	W	W	W	W	W	L	W	D
Position	1	6	2	1	2	4	3	2	2	3	3	3	7	9	8	9	9	9	9	10	11	11	11	10	11	12	12	12	12	12	14	13	11	8	8	7	8	8	8

Updated to match(es) played on 17 May 2025. Source: Matches
A = Away; H = Home; W = Win; D = Draw; L = Loss

==== Points by opponent ====
Team	Results				Points
Team	Regular		Play-out		Points
Team	Home	Away	Home	Away	Points
Buzău	2–1	0–0		2–0	7
CFR Cluj	0–1	2–3			0
Dinamo	1–1	0–1			1
Farul	0–0	1–0	0–0		5
FC Botoșani	0–0	3–2		1–0	7
FCSB	1–4	2–0			3
Hermannstadt	1–0	0–1	1–2		3
Petrolul	0–0	0–0		3–1	5
Poli Iasi	2–3	1–2	1–0		3
Rapid	1–1	0–0			2
Sepsi	2–0	0–2		3–0	6
Slobozia	0–2	1–0	2–0		6
U Cluj	0–1	0–2			0
U Craiova	1–1	1–2			1
UTA	1–1	1–1		0–2	2

Source: SCOG

==== Matches ====
15 July 2024 Matchday 1	FC Botoșani	2–3	Oțelul Galați	Botoșani
18:30 EEST (UTC+03)	Friday 33'; Mailat 56'; Adrian Chică-Roșă (yellow card) 20'; Aldaír (yellow card) 41'; Celea (yellow card) 45+2'	(Report)	A. Pop 6'; Živulić 65', 67', (yellow card) 29'; Stevanović (yellow card) 90+9'	Stadium: Municipal; Attendance: 2,830; Referee: Cristian Moldoveanu

22 July 2024 Matchday 2	Oțelul Galați	0–0	Farul Constanța	Galați
22:00 EEST (UTC+03)	Cissé (yellow card) 90+2'	(Report)		Stadium: Oțelul; Attendance: 7,235; Referee: Radu Petrescu

26 July 2024 Matchday 3	FCSB	0–2	Oțelul Galați	Bucharest
22:00 EEST (UTC+03)	Antwi (yellow card) 50'; Alhassan (yellow card) 65'	(Report)	Cisotti 44'; Živulić 59'	Stadium: Arena Națională; Attendance: 4,754; Referee: Andrei Moroiță

2 August 2024 Matchday 4	Oțelul Galați	1–0	Hermannstadt	Galați
19:00 EEST (UTC+03)	Jurić 87'	(Report)	Chițu (yellow card) 56'; Bejan (yellow card) 90+3'	Stadium: Oțelul; Attendance: 5,580; Referee: Horațiu Feșnic

10 August 2024 Matchday 5	UTA Arad	1–1	Oțelul Galați	Arad
19:00 EEST (UTC+03)	João Pedro 90+7' (pen.); Van Durmen (yellow card) 5'; Cristian Mihai (yellow card) 26'	(Report)	Jurić 13'; Živulić (yellow card) 43'; Răzvan Tănasă (yellow card) 45+3'; Zhelev (yellow card) 54'; Mihai Adăscăliței (yellow card) 90+2'	Stadium: Francisc von Neuman; Attendance: 7,000; Referee: Szabolcs Kovacs

23 August 2024 Matchday 7	Petrolul Ploiești	0–0	Oțelul Galați	Ploiești
19:00 EEST (UTC+03)		(Report)	Đurić (yellow card) 33'; Lameira (yellow card) 58'; Cissé (yellow card) 90+5'	Stadium: Ilie Oană; Attendance: 6,653; Referee: Rareș Vidican

30 August 2024 Matchday 8	Oțelul Galați	2–0	Sepsi OSK	Galați
21:00 EEST (UTC+03)	A. Pop 22', 42'; Cisotti (yellow card) 52'; Jurić (yellow card) 65'	(Report)	Kecskés (yellow card) 35'; Ștefan (yellow card) 80'	Stadium: Oțelul; Attendance: 5,938; Referee: Florin Andrei

14 September 2024 Matchday 9	Gloria Buzău	0–0	Oțelul Galați	Buzău
18:45 EEST (UTC+03)	Budescu (yellow card) 72'	(Report)	Zhelev (yellow card) 83'; Stevanović (yellow card) 30' (yellow-red card) 90+2'	Stadium: Municipal; Attendance: 4,000; Referee: George Găman

20 September 2024 Matchday 10	Oțelul Galați	1–1	Dinamo București	Galați
21:00 EEST (UTC+03)	Maciel 22'; Popescu (yellow card) 17'	(Report)	Selmani 18' (pen.)	Stadium: Oțelul; Attendance: 9,678; Referee: Viorel Flueran

28 September 2024 Matchday 11	Rapid București	0–0	Oțelul Galați	Bucharest
21:30 EEST (UTC+03)	Käit (yellow card) 70'; Grameni (yellow card) 85'	(Report)		Stadium: Rapid-Giulești; Attendance: 12,054; Referee: Marcel Bîrsan

5 October 2024 Matchday 12	Oțelul Galați	1–1	Universitatea Craiova	Galați
21:30 EEST (UTC+03)	Jurić 5'; Lameira (yellow card) 38'	(Report)	Baiaram 14'	Stadium: Oțelul; Attendance: 6,023; Referee: István Kovács

18 October 2024 Matchday 13	Universitatea Cluj	2–0	Oțelul Galați	Cluj-Napoca
21:00 EEST (UTC+03)	Nistor 61' (pen.); Thiam 69'; Lasure (yellow card) 16'; Bic (yellow card) 56'	(Report)	Angha (yellow card) 85'	Stadium: Cluj Arena; Attendance: 9,140; Referee: Andrei Chivulete

27 October 2024 Matchday 14	Oțelul Galați	0–2	Unirea Slobozia	Galați
16:00 EET (UTC+02)	Cisotti (yellow card) 30'; Bourard (yellow card) 80'; Stevanović (red card) 73'	(Report)	Perianu 47'; Șerbănică 85'; Antoche (yellow card) 70'	Stadium: Oțelul; Attendance: 5,105; Referee: Iulian Călin

3 November 2024 Matchday 15	Poli Iași	2–1	Oțelul Galați	Iași
13:30 EET (UTC+02)	Tailson 71'; Gheorghiță 74'; Ispas (yellow card) 75'	(Report)	Maciel 2'; Tomašević (yellow card) 67'; Teles (yellow card) 19'; Stevanović (red card) 26'	Stadium: Emil Alexandrescu; Attendance: 4,752; Referee: Marian Barbu

8 November 2024 Matchday 16	Oțelul Galați	0–0	FC Botoșani	Galați
18:00 EET (UTC+02)	Angha (yellow card) 31'	(Report)	Sadiku (yellow card) 60' (yellow-red card) 86'	Stadium: Oțelul; Attendance: 2,978; Referee: Horațiu Feșnic

11 November 2024 Matchday 6	Oțelul Galați	0–1	CFR Cluj	Galați
21:00 EET (UTC+02)	Lameira (yellow card) 83'; Stevanović (yellow card) 90+2'	(Report)	Đoković 18', (yellow card) 90+4'; Leo Bolgado (yellow card) 61'; Hindrich (yellow card) 90'; Ilie (yellow card) 90+4'	Stadium: Oțelul; Attendance: 1,455; Referee: Rareș Vidican

22 November 2024 Matchday 17	Farul Constanța	0–1	Oțelul Galați	Ovidiu
20:30 EET (UTC+02)	Ganea (yellow card) 36'; Vînă (yellow card) 45+1'; Bălașa (yellow card) 49'	(Report)	Teles 90+5'; Bourard (yellow card) 2'; Lameira (yellow card) 30'; Angha (yellow card) 31'	Stadium: Viitorul; Attendance: 2,000; Referee: Andrei Chivulete

2 December 2024 Matchday 18	Oțelul Galați	1–4	FCSB	Galați
20:30 EET (UTC+02)	A. Pop 54' (pen.); Teles (yellow card) 55'; Miguel Silva (yellow card) 90'	(Report)	Bîrligea 9', 48'; Musi 40', (yellow card) 16'; Olaru 81'; Ngezana (yellow card) 76'	Stadium: Oțelul; Attendance: 6,532; Referee: Horațiu Feșnic

9 December 2024 Matchday 19	Hermannstadt	1–0	Oțelul Galați	Sibiu
17:30 EET (UTC+02)	Iancu 26'; Ivanov (yellow card) 34'; Balaure (yellow card) 41'; Neguț (yellow card) 67'; Căpușă (yellow card) 68'	(Report)	Cissé (yellow card) 27'	Stadium: Municipal; Attendance: 1,481; Referee: Cristian Moldoveanu

14 December 2024 Matchday 20	Oțelul Galați	1–1	UTA Arad	Galați
14:30 EET (UTC+02)	Cisotti 54'; A. Pop (yellow card) 30'; Živulić (yellow card) 72'	(Report)	Cristian Mihai 38'	Stadium: Oțelul; Attendance: 1,738; Referee: Ionela Peşu

22 December 2024 Matchday 21	CFR Cluj	3–2	Oțelul Galați	Cluj-Napoca
15:00 EET (UTC+02)	Korenica 21'; Munteanu 49'; Nkololo 83', (yellow card) 90+1'	(Report)	A. Pop 45+1' (pen.); Cisotti 82'; Lameira (yellow card) 90+1'; Popescu (yellow card) 90+7'	Stadium: Dr. Constantin Rădulescu; Attendance: 2,131; Referee: Sebastian Colțescu

18 January 2025 Matchday 22	Oțelul Galați	0–0	Petrolul Ploiești	Galați
19:30 EET (UTC+02)	Stevanović (yellow card) 76'; Roșu (yellow card) 89'	(Report)	Huja (yellow card) 30'	Stadium: Oțelul; Attendance: 5,450; Referee: Horia Mladinovici

26 January 2025 Matchday 23	Sepsi OSK	2–0	Oțelul Galați	Sfântu Gheorghe
17:00 EET (UTC+02)	Niňaj 55'; Mailat 90+1'	(Report)	Miguel Silva (yellow card) 55'	Stadium: Sepsi Arena; Attendance: 2,500; Referee: Rareș Vidican

1 February 2025 Matchday 24	Oțelul Galați	2–1	Gloria Buzău	Galați
17:00 EET (UTC+02)	Maciel 7', 71'; Miguel Silva (yellow card) 41'; Răzvan Tănasă (yellow card) 29'; Cissé (yellow card) 82'; Lameira (yellow card) 90+1'	(Report)	Jipa 45+2'; Budescu (yellow card) 60'	Stadium: Oțelul; Attendance: 2,433; Referee: George Găman

4 February 2025 Matchday 25	Dinamo București	1–0	Oțelul Galați	București
20:30 EET (UTC+02)	Selmani 90+8' (pen.); Costin (yellow card) 90+11'	(Report)	Angha (yellow card) 43'; Živulić (yellow card) 88'	Stadium: Arcul de Triumf; Attendance: 6,000; Referee: Andrei Moroiță

8 February 2025 Matchday 26	Oțelul Galați	1–1	Rapid București	Galați
19:00 EET (UTC+02)	Miguel Silva 84'; Roșu (yellow card) 57'; Popescu (yellow card) 67'; Lameira (yellow card) 68'	(Report)	Petrila 74'; Gojković (yellow card) 71'; Christensen (yellow card) 85'	Stadium: Oțelul; Attendance: 6,377; Referee: Sebastian Colțescu

14 February 2025 Matchday 27	Universitatea Craiova	2–1	Oțelul Galați	Craiova
20:00 EET (UTC+02)	Baiaram 54'; Maldonado 76'; Mitriță (yellow card) 36'; Houri (yellow card) 50'; Screciu (yellow card) 51'	(Report)	Bani 72'; Stevanović (yellow card) 29'; Roșu (yellow card) 31'; Maftei (yellow card) 46'	Stadium: Ion Oblemenco; Attendance: 6,000; Referee: Andrei Chivulete

21 February 2025 Matchday 28	Oțelul Galați	0–1	Universitatea Cluj	Galați
20:00 EET (UTC+02)		(Report)	Fábry 20'	Stadium: Oțelul; Referee: Horia Mladinovici

28 February 2025 Matchday 29	Unirea Slobozia	0–1	Oțelul Galați	Clinceni
17:00 EET (UTC+02)	Christ Afalna (yellow card) 36'	(Report)	Blažek 61' (o.g.); Marković (yellow card) 87'; Dur-Bozoancă (yellow card) 90+1'; Teles (red card) 55'	Stadium: Clinceni; Attendance: 139; Referee: Rareș Vidican

7 March 2025 Matchday 30	Oțelul Galați	2–3	Poli Iași	Galați
17:00 EET (UTC+02)	Marković 17'; Răzvan Tănasă 27'; Živulić (yellow card) 62'; Cissé (red card) 71'	(Report)	Camara 38'; Marchioni 39'; Ștefanovici 90+6'; Guilherme (red card) 5'	Stadium: Oțelul; Attendance: 4,572; Referee: Radu Petrescu

16 March 2025 Play-out 1	UTA Arad	2–0	Oțelul Galați	Arad
18:00 EET (UTC+02)	Živulić 23' (o.g.); Tzionis 45'; Omondi (yellow card) 71'	(Report)	Angha (yellow card) 34'; Živulić (yellow card) 69'; Plaza (yellow card) 89'	Stadium: Francisc von Neuman; Referee: Marcel Bîrsan

31 March 2025 Play-out 2	Gloria Buzău	0–2	Oțelul Galați	Buzău
17:30 EEST (UTC+03)	Puerto (yellow card) 44'; Jipa (yellow card) 68'; Léa Siliki (yellow card) 85'; Brobbey (yellow card) 86'	(Report)	Teles 12', (yellow card) 88'; Maciel 16'; Živulić (yellow card) 30'; Marković (yellow card) 90+2'; Zhelev (yellow card) 90+3'	Stadium: Municipal; Referee: Sebastian Colțescu

4 April 2025 Play-out 3	Oțelul Galați	1–0	Poli Iași	Galați
17:30 EEST (UTC+03)	Răzvan Tănasă 35', (yellow card) 53'	(Report)		Stadium: Oțelul; Attendance: 4,292; Referee: Marian Barbu

14 April 2025 Play-out 4	FC Botoșani	0–1	Oțelul Galați	Botoșani
17:30 EEST (UTC+03)	Anestis (yellow card) 10'; Mouaddib (yellow card) 45+2'; Friday (yellow card) 90+2'; Aldaír (red card) 10'	(Report)	Teles 29'; Zhelev (yellow card) 40'; Bourard (yellow card) 49'; Živulić (yellow card) 73'; Dur-Bozoancă (yellow card) 80'; Lameira (yellow card) 85'; Stevanović (yellow card) 90+9'	Stadium: Municipal; Attendance: 3,894; Referee: Rareș Vidican

18 April 2025 Play-out 5	Oțelul Galați	2–0	Unirea Slobozia	Galați
17:00 EEST (UTC+03)	Antoche 43' (o.g.); Maciel 51', (yellow card) 69'; Cissé (yellow card) 63'	(Report)	Florinel Ibrian (yellow card) 54'	Stadium: Oțelul; Attendance: 7,491; Referee: George Găman

25 April 2025 Play-out 6	Sepsi OSK	0–3	Oțelul Galați	Sfântu Gheorghe
21:00 EEST (UTC+03)	Niczuly (yellow card) 9'; Mino (yellow card) 24'; Niňaj (yellow card) 56'	(Report)	Teles 11' (pen.); Răzvan Tănasă 33', 80'; Roșu (yellow card) 46'	Stadium: Sepsi Arena; Attendance: 5,500; Referee: Andrei Chivulete

4 May 2025 Play-out 7	Oțelul Galați	1–2	Hermannstadt	Galați
20:45 EEST (UTC+03)	Bourard 22'	(Report)	Murgia 60'; Gonçalves 62'; Ian. Stoica (yellow card) 37'; Balaure (yellow card) 81'	Stadium: Oțelul; Attendance: 6,584; Referee: Andrei Moroiță

12 May 2025 Play-out 8	Petrolul Ploiești	1–3	Oțelul Galați	Ploiești
18:00 EEST (UTC+03)	Rădulescu 12'; Irobiso (yellow card) 70'; Bratu (yellow card) 79'; Radu (yellow card) 83'	(Report)	Cissé 25'; Răzvan Tănasă 59'; Stevanović 73'; Maciel (yellow card) 35'; Teles (yellow card) 50'; Živulić (yellow card) 57'	Stadium: Ilie Oană; Attendance: 3,300; Referee: Rareș Vidican

16 May 2025 Play-out 9	Oțelul Galați	0–0	Farul Constanța	Galați
18:00 EEST (UTC+03)	Zhelev (yellow card) 53'; Stevanović (yellow card) 62'	(Report)	Dican (yellow card) 18'; Buta (yellow card) 84'	Stadium: Oțelul; Referee: Iulian Călin

=== Cupa României ===
30 October 2024 Group-stage 1	Csíkszereda	2–1	Oțelul Galați	Miercurea Ciuc
18:00 EET (UTC+02)	Dolný 86' (pen.); Ceará 90+5'	(Report)	Răzvan Tănasă 10'; Đurić (yellow card) 43'	Stadium: Municipal; Referee: Horia Mladinovici

5 December 2024 Group-stage 2	Râmnicu Vâlcea	2–4	Oțelul Galați	Râmnicu Vâlcea
14:00 EET (UTC+02)	Pârvulescu 12'; Alexandru Sălcianu 28'; Dandea (yellow card) 89'	(Report)	Jurić 13', 24'; Yabré 49'; Bourard 59'	Stadium: Municipal; Attendance: 4,500; Referee: George Găman

17 December 2024 Group-stage 3	Oțelul Galați	0–0	Sepsi OSK	Galați
20:00 EET (UTC+02)				Stadium: Oțelul; Referee: Viorel Flueran

=== Friendlies ===
28 June 2024	Celje (Slovenia)	2–3	Oțelul Galați	Kranjska Gora, Slovenia
12:00 EEST (UTC+03)	Karlo Speljak 12'; Bajde 87'	(Report)	Teles 17'; Răzvan Tănasă 29'; Đurić 43'	Stadium: Sports park Ruteč

1 July 2024	Jedinstvo Ub (Serbia)	0–1	Oțelul Galați	Csepreg, Hungary
18:00 EEST (UTC+03)		(Report)	Bogdan Stăuciuc 67'	Stadium: Csepregi focipálya

3 July 2024	Marsaxlokk (Malta)	1–4	Oțelul Galați	Schwadorf, Austria
18:30 EEST (UTC+03)	Lucas Lopez 81'	(Report)	Maciel 27'; Răzvan Tănasă 31', 38'; Cristian Chira 82'	Stadium: Sportplatz Schwadorf

17 August 2024	ACS Unirea Braniștea	1–3	Oțelul Galați	Braniștea
11:00 EEST (UTC+03)	62'	(Report)	A. Pop 49' (pen.); Cristian Chira 56'; Cojocaru 76'	Stadium: Comunal

11 October 2024	CSM Focșani	1–3	Oțelul Galați	Focșani
15:00 EEST (UTC+03)	15'	(Report)	Andronache 14'; Tomašević 23'; Bourard 30'	Stadium: Milcovul

11 January 2025	Universitatea Craiova	1–2	Oțelul Galați	Buftea
13:00 EET (UTC+02)	Koljić 87' (pen.)	(Report)	Răzvan Tănasă 64'; Stan 73'	Stadium: Romanian National Football Centre

22 March 2025	Oțelul Galați	4–0	CSM Focșani	Galați
12:00 EET (UTC+02)	Miguel Silva 18'; Julián Bonilla 50'; Alexandru Mitulețu 73'; Alexandru Burcea 86' (pen.)	(Report)		Stadium: Oțelul; Referee: Adrian Cojocaru

30 April 2025	Oțelul Galați	4–1	ACS Unirea Braniștea	Galați
	Stan 8', 32'; Bani 85'; Marković 89'	(Report)	Mădălin Grădinaru 75'	Stadium: Oțelul

== See also ==
- ASC Oțelul Galați
- 2024–25 Liga I
- 2024–25 Cupa României
