= Leșu (disambiguation) =

Leșu may refer to:

- Leșu, a commune in Bistriţa-Năsăud County, Romania
- Leșu, a tributary of the Iad in Bihor County, Romania
- Leșu (Ilva), a tributary of the Ilva in Romania
- Leșu, a tributary of the Bistrița in Romania
- Lake Leșu in Bihor County, Romania
- Leșu Ursului mine, a large mine in the east of Romania in Suceava County close to Broșteni

== See also ==
- Leșile (disambiguation)
