= Brotherhood of Dolores (El Viso del Alcor) =

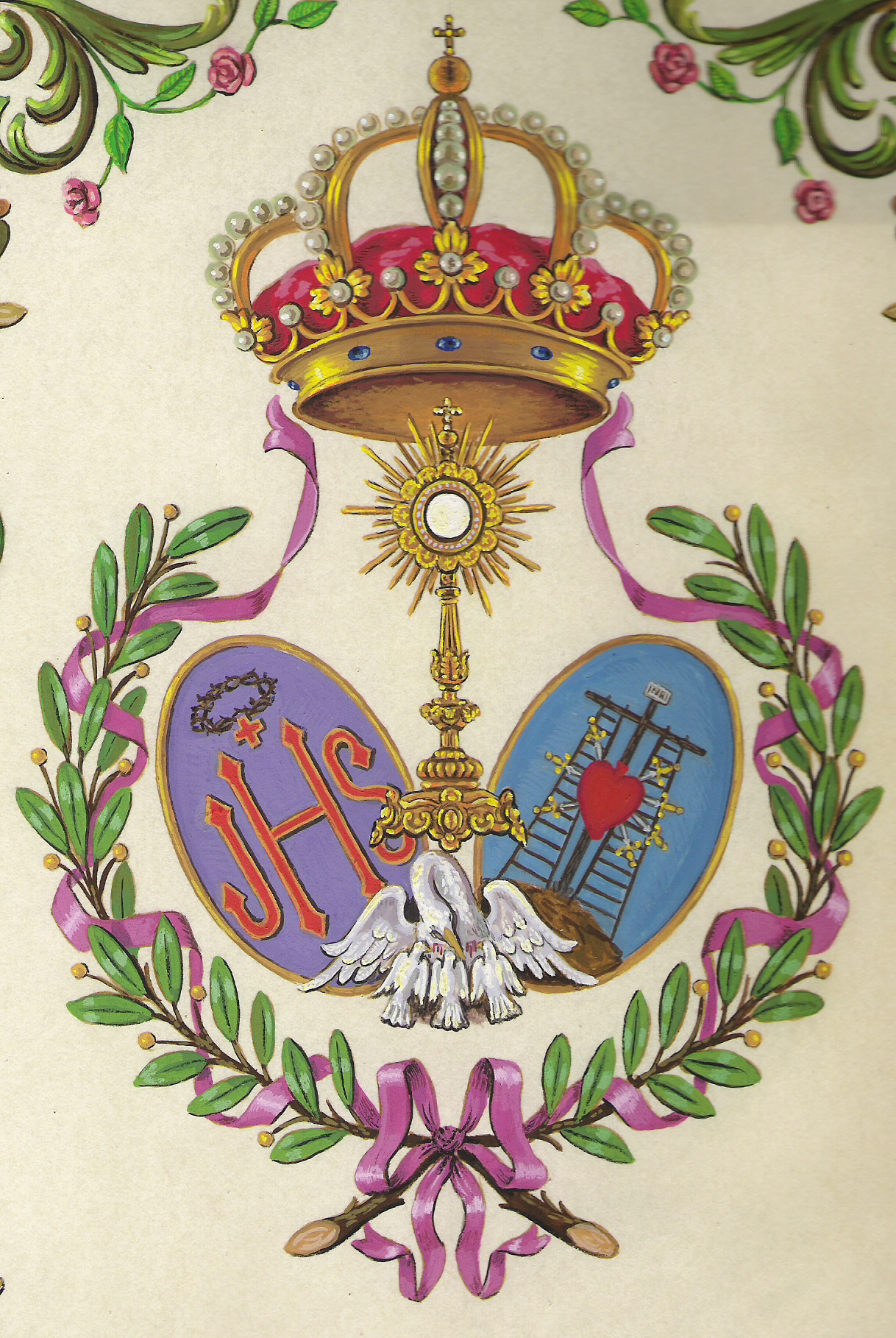
Coat of arms of the Brotherhood

The Antigua, Real e Ilustre Hermandad del Santísimo Sacramento, Ánimas Benditas, Santo Lignum Crucis y Cofradía de Nazarenos del Santísimo Cristo del Amor, Santo Entierro de Nuestro Señor Jesucristo y Nuestra Señora de los Dolores is one of the brotherhoods who parade in the Holy Week of El Viso del Alcor (Seville). Performs his penance station on the afternoon of Good Friday.

== History ==
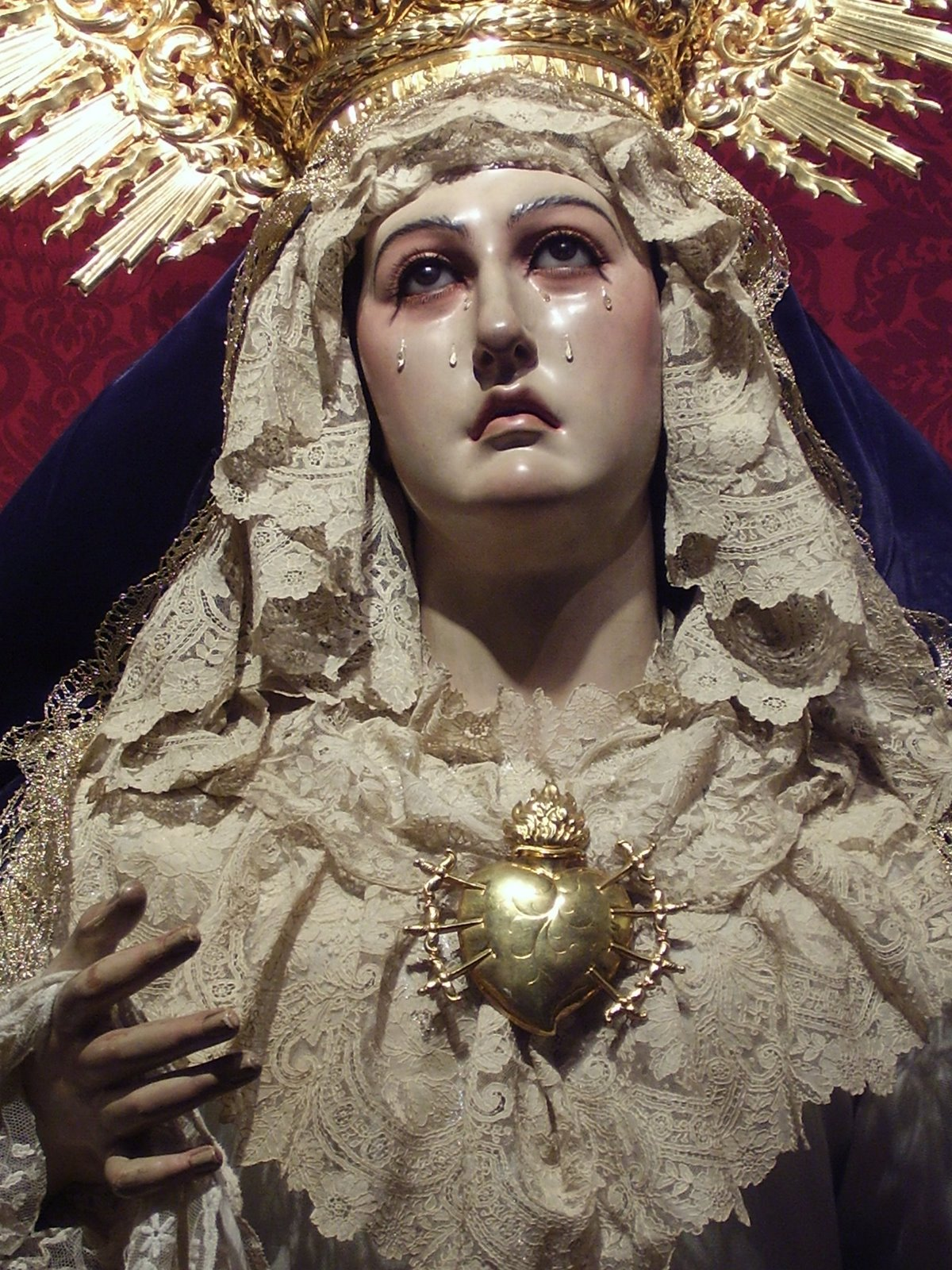
Our Lady of Sorrows

In the early twenty emerges a new brotherhood in El Viso del Alcor, which gather around the veneration to the image of Our Lady of Sorrows. Its founders are five parishioners youths of the locality, that encouraged by the foreman of the passage of the Our Lady of Sorrows, Ramón Guerrero Jiménez. There are Manuel Guerrero Borreguero, Rafael de los Santos Falcón, Aurelio Jiménez León, Camilo León Guerrero and Manuel León Cordones. The exact day of the foundation of the brotherhood is on April 16, 1922.

Holy Week of 1924 made the first season of penance of the brotherhood. The first question of the Holy Virgin of Sorrows is the Friday of Sorrows of 1930, which took place after the main function of institute.

== Bibliography ==
- Crucificados de Sevilla. Ediciones Tartessos. ISBN 84-7663-041-7
- Campillo de los Santos, José Ángel. El Viso del Alcor: su historia. El Viso del Alcor, Excmo Ayuntamiento, 1995.
- Magazines of the Brotherhood of Dolores.
