= Leșile =

Leşile may refer to several villages in Romania:

- Leşile, a village in Teiu Commune, Argeș County
- Leşile, a village in Șimnicu de Sus Commune, Dolj County

== See also ==
- Leșu (disambiguation)
