= David Maftei =

Romanian footballer

Personal information
- Full name: David Iulian Maftei
- Date of birth: 12 July 2004 (age 22)
- Place of birth: Vaslui, Romania
- Height: 1.70 m (5 ft 7 in)
- Position: Right back

Team information
- Current team: Farul Constanța
- Number: 2

Youth career
- –2017: LPS Vaslui
- 2017–2018: Comstar Vaslui
- 2018–2022: Gheorghe Hagi Academy

Senior career*
Years	Team	Apps	(Gls)
2022–	Farul Constanța	30	(1)
2022–2023	→ Unirea Dej (loan)	27	(1)
2023–2024	→ CSA Steaua București (loan)	24	(4)
2024–2025	→ Oțelul Galați (loan)	22	(0)

International career^{‡}
2019	Romania U16	2	(0)
2021	Romania U17	1	(0)
2021–2022	Romania U18	8	(1)
2022–2023	Romania U19	7	(0)
2024–2025	Romania U20	4	(0)
2024–2026	Romania U21	4	(0)
- * Club domestic league appearances and goals as of 4 September 2026 ‡ National team caps and goals as of 31 March 2026

David Iulian Maftei (born 12 July 2004) is a Romanian professional footballer who plays as a right back for Liga I club Farul Constanța.

== Career statistics ==
As of match played 4 September 2026

Appearances and goals by club, season and competition
Club	Season	League			Cupa României		Europe		Other		Total	
Club	Season	Division	Apps	Goals	Apps	Goals	Apps	Goals	Apps	Goals	Apps	Goals
Unirea Dej (loan)	2022–23	Liga II	27	1	0	0	—		—		27	1
CSA Steaua București (loan)	2023–24	Liga II	24	4	4	0	—		—		28	4
Oțelul Galați (loan)	2024–25	Liga I	22	0	1	0	—		—		23	0
Farul Constanța	2025–26	Liga I	29	1	1	0	—		2 (Note: Appearances in Liga I promotion/relegation play-offs)	0	32	1
Farul Constanța	2026–27	Liga I	1	0	0	0	—		—		1	0
Farul Constanța	Total		30	1	1	0	—		2	0	33	1
Career total			103	6	6	0	—		2	0	111	6
