= Leșu Ursului mine =

Copper mine in Romania

Leşu Ursului mine
- Location within Romania
- Location: Broșteni, Suceava County, Romania; 47°20′32.57″N 25°42′25.34″E
- Products: Copper
- Opened: 1965
- Closed: 2007
- Company: Minbucovina

The Leşu Ursului mine was a large mine in the east of Romania in Suceava County close to Broșteni. Leşu Ursului represents one of the largest copper reserve in Romania having estimated reserves of 18 million tonnes of ore grading 16% copper.
