= Leon Mrejeriu =

Romanian teacher, folklorist and journalist

Leon Mrejeru, published in the newspaper "Viitorul" in April 1936.

Leon Mrejeriu (February 10, 1879 – May 14, 1945) was a Romanian teacher, folklorist and journalist.

Born in Cotârgași, Suceava County, in the Romanian Old Kingdom, Mrejeriu attended six grades of primary school in nearby Broșteni, followed by two years of gymnasium in Fălticeni and the Vasile Lupu Normal School of Iași from 1894 to 1899. He was a teacher in Crucea village from 1899 to 1904. He then taught in Doamna (1904), at the orphanage in Zorleni (1904–1908), in Poiana Teiului and the nearby village of Călugăreni (1908–1914) and Târgu Neamț (1914–1916). He ultimately settled at a primary school in Piatra Neamț, remaining there until his retirement in 1936. He was a school inspector in Neamț County. He held a similar position from 1914 to 1916 in the newly acquired town of Silistra, where he established the Romanian school. He served in World War I, attaining the rank of captain and being decorated with the Orders of Saint Ana, of the Crown and of the Star of Romania.

Following the creation of Greater Romania, Mrejeriu was a cultural propagandist in Bessarabia and a school inspector in Transylvania and Bukovina. He served in the Assembly of Deputies and was Prefect of Neamț County. As such, he helped build over a hundred primary schools in the county, where he founded a girls’ high school, for which he also ensured a new building. Together with Mihail Lupescu and Tudor Pamfile, he founded Ion Creangă magazine in Zorleni. Additional contributions of his appeared in Șezătoarea, Convorbiri Literare, Vestitorul Satelor, Calendarul Satelor, Albina, Revista Generala a Învățământului and Învățământul Primar. He died in Mizil and was reburied in Piatra Neamț in 1968.
