= Samy Bourard =

Belgian footballer (born 1996)

Samy Bourard سامي بورارد
Personal information
- Date of birth: 29 March 1996 (age 30)
- Place of birth: Liège, Belgium
- Height: 1.80 m (5 ft 11 in)
- Position: Midfielder

Team information
- Current team: Flamurtari
- Number: 11

Youth career
- 2003–2005: Sint-Truiden
- 2005–2012: Visetois
- 2012–2016: Anderlecht

Senior career*
Years	Team	Apps	(Gls)
2016–2018	Sint-Truiden	2	(0)
2018–2020	FC Eindhoven	59	(13)
2020–2021	ADO Den Haag	17	(3)
2021	Fehérvár	5	(0)
2021–2022	ADO Den Haag	32	(8)
2022–2024	Hapoel Hadera	58	(10)
2024–2025	Oțelul Galați	19	(1)
2025–	Flamurtari	13	(3)

International career
2012–2013	Belgium U17	13	(3)
2013	Belgium U18	1	(0)
- * Club domestic league appearances and goals as of 14:23, 26 December 2025 (UTC)

Samy Bourard (Arabic: سامي بورارد; born 29 March 1996) is a Belgian professional footballer who plays as a midfielder for Albanian Kategoria Superiore club Flamurtari.

== Club career ==
=== Sint-Truiden ===
He made his Belgian First Division A debut for Sint-Truiden on 4 November 2017 in a game against Eupen.

=== ADO Den Haag ===
He made his Eredivisie debut against Heracles. He played 19 games for ADO Den Haag and scored 3 times. He had a fantastic game against AFC Ajax with 1 goal and 1 beautiful assist.

=== Fehérvár ===
On 9 February 2021, he was signed by three time Hungarian League champions Fehérvár FC.

=== Return to ADO Den Haag ===
On 31 August 2021, he returned to ADO Den Haag for the 2021–22 season.

=== Flamurtari ===
In August 2025, Bourard signed with newly promoted Albanian Kategoria Superiore club Flamurtari.

== International career ==
Born in Belgium, Bourard is of Moroccan descent. He is a former youth international for Belgium.

== Honours ==
Fehérvár

- Magyar Kupa runner-up: 2020–21
