= Broșteni, Suceava =

Broșteni
- Town
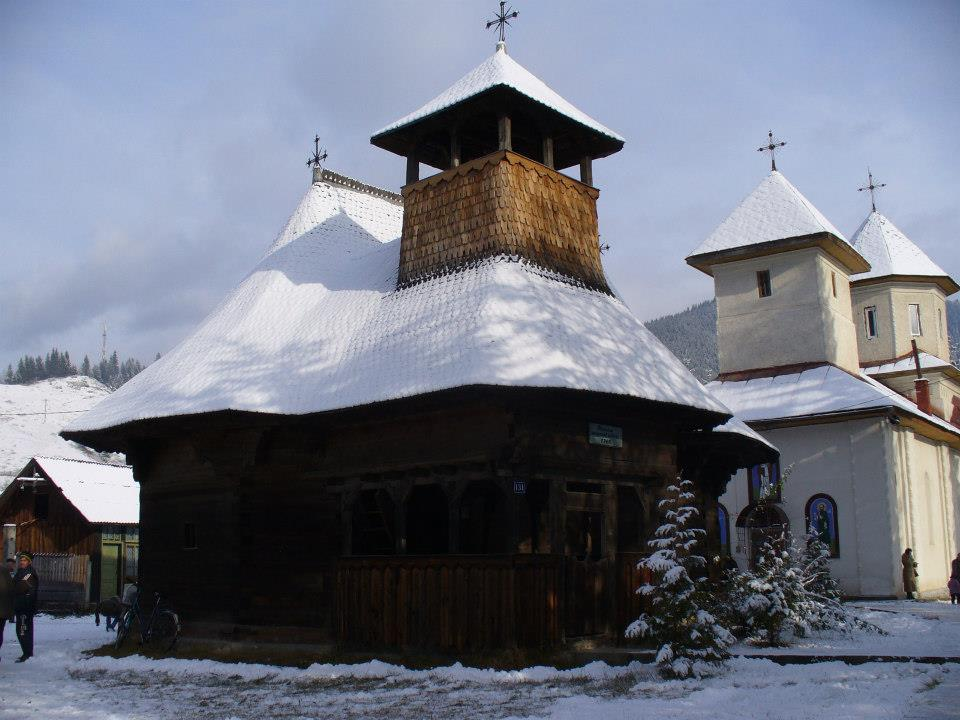
- Saint Nicholas Wooden Church in Broșteni

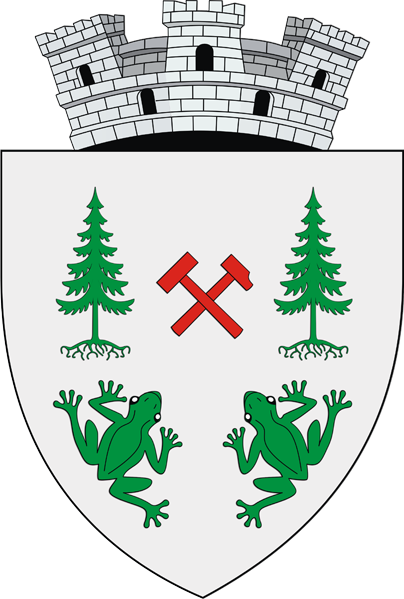
- Coat of arms

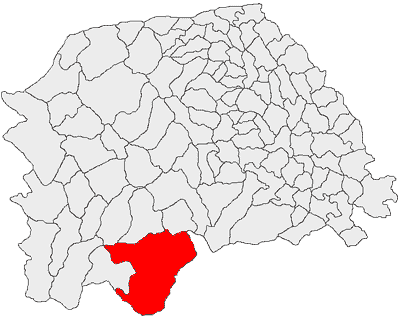
- Location in Suceava County

- Location in Romania
- Coordinates: 47°14′39″N 25°41′53″E
- Country: Romania
- County: Suceava

Government
  - Mayor (2024–2028): Alexandru Hurjui (PNL)
- Area: 424.40 km^{2} (163.86 sq mi)
- Elevation: 630 m (2,070 ft)
- Population (2021-12-01): 5,179
  - Density: 12.20/km^{2} (31.61/sq mi)
- Time zone: UTC+02:00 (EET)
  - Summer (DST): UTC+03:00 (EEST)
- Postal code: 727075
- Area code: (+40) 02 30
- Vehicle reg.: SV
- Website: www.primariabrosteni.ro

Historical population
Year	Pop.	±%
2002	6,603	—
2011	5,388	−18.4%
2021	5,179	−3.9%
Source: Romanian census data

Broșteni is a town in Suceava County, in the historical region of Western Moldavia, northeastern Romania. Broșteni is the fourteenth largest urban settlement in the county, with a population of 5,179 inhabitants, according to the 2021 census. It was declared a town in 2004, along with seven other localities in Suceava County. The town administers the former villages of Hăleasa, Lungeni, and Neagra (which became neighborhoods in 2004), and Cotârgași, Dârmoxa, Frasin, Holda, Holdița, and Pietroasa (with the status of associated villages).

== History ==
Broșteni is a former mining community located on the banks of the river Bistrița, between the Bistrița Mountains and the Stânișoara Mountains. It administers a total area of 424.40 km^{2} (163.86 sq mi) – the largest area being administered by a single locality in Suceava County. The national road between Vatra Dornei and Piatra Neamț is the main communication way for Broșteni, which is not connected to the national railway system.

== Natives ==
- Paul Antoche (born 1992), footballer
- Mihai Băcescu (1908–1999), zoologist
- Andrei Cornea (born 1999), Olympic gold medalist in rowing
- Leon Mrejeriu (1879–1945), teacher, folklorist, and journalist

== Gallery ==
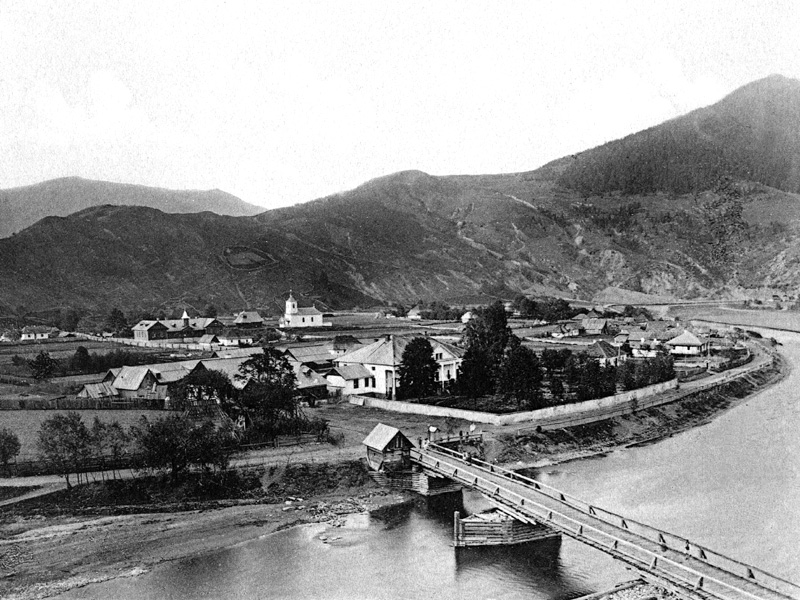
Broșteni, during the early 20th century
