= Paul Antoche =

Romanian footballer (born 1992)

Personal information
- Full name: Marius Paul Antoche
- Date of birth: 21 June 1992 (age 34)
- Place of birth: Broșteni, Romania
- Height: 1.84 m (6 ft 0 in)
- Positions: Centre-back; defensive midfielder

Team information
- Current team: Bihor Oradea
- Number: 21

Youth career
- –2011: Sportul Studențesc

Senior career*
Years	Team	Apps	(Gls)
2011–2013	Otopeni	3	(0)
2013	→ Balotești (loan)		
2014	Unirea Tărlungeni	28	(0)
2015–2017	Balotești	65	(6)
2017–2019	Petrolul Ploiești	28	(1)
2019–2021	Farul Constanța	56	(5)
2021–2024	Hermannstadt	43	(0)
2024–2026	Unirea Slobozia	61	(0)
2026–	Bihor Oradea	7	(0)
- * Club domestic league appearances and goals as of 22 October 2026

Marius Paul Antoche (born 21 June 1992) is a Romanian professional footballer who plays as a centre-back or a defensive midfielder for Liga II club Bihor Oradea.

== Club career ==
Antoche grew up in the academy of Sportul Studențesc București.

In the first part of his career played he for various teams, such as: CS Otopeni, CS Balotești and Unirea Tărlungeni.

Antoche moved to Petrolul Ploiești in the summer of 2017 and achieved the promotion to play for Liga II.

In 2019, he then moved again, this time to play for Farul Constanța.

== Honours ==
Petrolul Ploiești

- Liga III: 2017–18
