= Israel Puerto =

Spanish footballer

Personal information
- Full name: Israel Puerto Pineda
- Date of birth: 15 June 1993 (age 33)
- Place of birth: El Viso del Alcor, Spain
- Height: 1.87 m (6 ft 1 1/2 in)
- Position: Centre-back

Team information
- Current team: Stal Mielec
- Number: 44

Youth career
- 2005–2010: Sevilla

Senior career*
Years	Team	Apps	(Gls)
2010–2014	Sevilla B	93	(3)
2013–2014	Sevilla	5	(0)
2014–2015	Villarreal B	25	(3)
2014	Villarreal	0	(0)
2015–2016	Lugo	31	(1)
2016–2017	Racing Santander	12	(1)
2017–2018	Mirandés	24	(0)
2018–2019	Recreativo	36	(4)
2019–2021	Śląsk Wrocław	49	(3)
2019	Śląsk Wrocław II	1	(0)
2021–2023	Jagiellonia Białystok	45	(3)
2023–2024	Al-Jabalain	26	(5)
2024–2025	Gloria Buzău	15	(0)
2025–	Stal Mielec	25	(3)

International career
2009–2010	Spain U17	6	(0)
2011	Spain U18	2	(0)
2012	Spain U19	3	(0)
2012–2013	Spain U20	11	(1)
2014	Spain U21	1	(0)
Medal record
Representing Spain
Men's football
UEFA European Under-17 Championship
Runner-up	2010 Liechtenstein
- * Club domestic league appearances and goals as of 21:14, 26 May 2026 (UTC)

Israel Puerto Pineda (born 15 June 1993) is a Spanish professional footballer who plays as a central defender for Polish club Stal Mielec.

== Club career ==
Born in El Viso del Alcor, Province of Seville, Andalusia, Puerto joined Sevilla FC's youth system at the age of 12. Four years later, he almost quit football due to a cardiovascular disease from which he eventually recovered fully.

Puerto spent his first seasons as a senior with the reserve team, competing in the Segunda División B. On 10 March 2013, he scored a brace against Arroyo CP in a 3–0 home win, and, on 28 April, he made his official debut with the main squad, coming on as an 87th-minute substitute for José Antonio Reyes in the 1–1 La Liga draw at Real Valladolid.

On 2 July 2014, Puerto moved to another reserve side, Villarreal CF B also of the third division. He made his debut with the first team on 4 December, starting a 2–1 away victory over Cádiz CF in the round of 32 of the Copa del Rey.

On 4 March 2015, Puerto was transferred to Segunda División club CD Lugo, signing a 1 1/2-year deal as a replacement for injured Jon García. In his debut, three days later, he scored his first professional goal, netting his team's first in the 3–2 home win over FC Barcelona B.

Puerto then returned to the Spanish third tier, representing in quick succession Racing de Santander, CD Mirandés and Recreativo de Huelva. The 26-year-old moved abroad for the first time in June 2019, signing with Śląsk Wrocław of the Polish Ekstraklasa. He scored his first top-flight goal on 28 June 2020, equalising an eventual 2–2 home draw with Lech Poznań.

Puerto continued competing abroad the following seasons, with Jagiellonia Białystok (Polish top division), Al-Jabalain FC (Saudi First Division League), FC Gloria Buzău (Romanian Liga I) and Stal Mielec (Poland's I liga).

== International career ==
Puerto won his only cap for the Spain under-21 team on 9 September 2014, playing 54 minutes in the 1–1 home draw against Austria for the 2015 UEFA European Championship qualifiers held in Puertollano.

== Career statistics ==
As of match played 24 May 2026

Appearances and goals by club, season and competition
Club	Season	League			National cup (Note: Includes Copa del Rey, Polish Cup, King's Cup)		Other		Total	
Club	Season	Division	Apps	Goals	Apps	Goals	Apps	Goals	Apps	Goals
Sevilla B	2010–11	Segunda División B	6	0	—		—		6	0
Sevilla B	2011–12	Segunda División B	22	0	—		—		22	0
Sevilla B	2012–13	Segunda División B	33	3	—		—		33	3
Sevilla B	2013–14	Segunda División B	32	0	—		—		32	0
Sevilla B	Total		93	3	—		—		93	3
Sevilla	2012–13	La Liga	2	0	0	0	—		2	0
Sevilla	2013–14	La Liga	3	0	0	0	1 (Note: Appearance in UEFA Europa League)	0	4	0
Sevilla	Total		5	0	0	0	1	0	6	0
Villarreal B	2014–15	Segunda División B	25	3	—		—		25	3
Villarreal	2014–15	La Liga	0	0	2	0	—		2	0
Lugo	2014–15	Segunda División	13	1	0	0	—		13	1
Lugo	2015–16	Segunda División	18	0	2	0	—		20	0
Lugo	Total		31	1	2	0	—		33	1
Racing Santander	2016–17	Segunda División B	12	1	1	0	2 (Note: Appearances in Segunda División B play-offs)	0	15	1
Mirandés	2017–18	Segunda División B	24	0	1	0	2	0	27	0
Recreativo	2018–19	Segunda División B	36	4	0	0	3	0	39	4
Śląsk Wrocław	2019–20	Ekstraklasa	32	2	0	0	—		32	2
Śląsk Wrocław	2020–21	Ekstraklasa	17	1	0	0	—		17	1
Śląsk Wrocław	Total		49	3	0	0	—		49	3
Śląsk Wrocław II	2019–20	III liga	1	0	—		—		1	0
Jagiellonia Białystok	2021–22	Ekstraklasa	19	3	1	0	—		20	3
Jagiellonia Białystok	2022–23	Ekstraklasa	26	0	2	0	—		28	0
Jagiellonia Białystok	Total		45	3	3	0	—		48	3
Al-Jabalain	2023–24	Saudi First Division League	26	5	1	0	—		27	5
Gloria Buzău	2024–25	Liga I	15	0	—		—		15	0
Stal Mielec	2025–26	I liga	25	3	1	0	—		26	3
Career total			387	26	11	0	8	0	406	26

== Honours ==
Sevilla

- UEFA Europa League: 2013–14

Śląsk Wrocław II

- III liga, group III: 2019–20

Spain U17

- UEFA European Under-17 Championship runner-up: 2010
