= Alex Stan =

Romanian footballer (born 2005)

Alexandru Stan
Personal information
- Full name: Alexandru Cristian Stan
- Date of birth: 25 September 2005 (age 21)
- Place of birth: Giurgiu, Romania
- Height: 1.82 m (6 ft 0 in)
- Position: Forward

Team information
- Current team: CSM Slatina
- Number: 9

Youth career
- 2012–2015: CS Cautis Steaua Sudului
- 2019–2022: CS Giganții Vărăști
- 2022–2023: Rapid București

Senior career*
Years	Team	Apps	(Gls)
2022–2026	Rapid București	5	(0)
2024	→ Mioveni (loan)	13	(2)
2024–2025	→ Gloria Buzău (loan)	11	(1)
2025	→ Oțelul Galați (loan)	7	(0)
2025–2026	→ Chindia Târgoviște (loan)	11	(1)
2026–	CSM Slatina	7	(1)

International career^{‡}
2023–2024	Romania U19	12	(4)
2024	Romania U20	6	(0)
- * Club domestic league appearances and goals as of 24 October 2026 ‡ National team caps and goals as of 19 November 2024

Alexandru Cristian Stan (born 25 September 2005) is a Romanian professional footballer who plays as a forward for Liga II club CSM Slatina.

== Club career ==
Stan made his debut on 18 December 2022 for Rapid București în a Liga I match against UTA Arad.

== Career statistics ==
As of match played 24 October 2026

Appearances and goals by club, season and competition
Club	Season	League			Cupa României		Europe		Other		Total	
Club	Season	Division	Apps	Goals	Apps	Goals	Apps	Goals	Apps	Goals	Apps	Goals
Rapid București	2022–23	Liga I	2	0	—		—		—		2	0
Rapid București	2023–24	Liga I	3	0	2	0	—		—		5	0
Rapid București	Total		5	0	2	0	0	0	0	0	7	0
Mioveni (loan)	2023–24	Liga II	13	2	—		—		2 (Note: Appearances in Liga I promotion/relegation play-offs)	0	15	2
Gloria Buzău (loan)	2024–25	Liga I	11	1	1	0	—		—		12	1
Oțelul Galați (loan)	2024–25	Liga I	7	0	—		—		—		7	0
Chindia Târgovişte (loan)	2025–26	Liga II	11	1	2	2	—		—		13	3
CSM Slatina	2026–27	Liga II	7	1	1	0	—		—		8	1
Career total			54	5	6	2	0	0	2	0	62	7
