= Andrei Gorcea =

Romanian footballer

Personal information
- Full name: Andrei Cristian Gorcea
- Date of birth: 2 August 2001 (age 25)
- Place of birth: Cluj-Napoca, Romania
- Height: 1.89 m (6 ft 2 in)
- Position: Goalkeeper

Team information
- Current team: UTA Arad
- Number: 33

Youth career
- –2020: Universitatea Cluj

Senior career*
Years	Team	Apps	(Gls)
2020–2025	Universitatea Cluj	70	(0)
2025–	UTA Arad	30	(0)
- * Club domestic league appearances and goals as of 5 September 2026

Andrei Cristian Gorcea (born 2 August 2001) is a Romanian professional footballer who plays as a goalkeeper for Liga I club UTA Arad.

== Club career ==
Gorcea made his Liga I debut for Universitatea Cluj on 17 July 2022, in a 1–1 draw to FCSB.

== International career ==
In June 2023, Gorcea was selected by Romania under-21 for the 2023 UEFA European Championship.

== Career statistics ==
=== Club ===
As of match played 5 September 2026

Appearances and goals by club, season and competition
Club	Season	League			Cupa României		Europe		Other		Total	
Club	Season	Division	Apps	Goals	Apps	Goals	Apps	Goals	Apps	Goals	Apps	Goals
Universitatea Cluj	2019–20	Liga II	2	0	0	0	—		—		2	0
Universitatea Cluj	2020–21	Liga II	1	0	1	0	—		—		2	0
Universitatea Cluj	2021–22	Liga II	24	0	1	0	—		2 (Note: Appearances in Liga I promotion/relegation play-offs)	0	27	0
Universitatea Cluj	2022–23	Liga I	25	0	5	0	—		—		30	0
Universitatea Cluj	2023–24	Liga I	18	0	1	0	—		0	0	19	0
Universitatea Cluj	2024–25	Liga I	0	0	1	0	—		—		1	0
Universitatea Cluj	Total		70	0	9	0	—		2	0	81	0
UTA Arad	2024–25	Liga I	3	0	—		—		—		3	0
UTA Arad	2025–26	Liga I	23	0	3	0	—		—		26	0
UTA Arad	2026–27	Liga I	4	0	1	0	—		—		5	0
UTA Arad	Total		30	0	4	0	—		—		34	0
Career total			100	0	13	0	—		2	0	115	0

== Honours ==
Universitatea Cluj

- Cupa României runner-up: 2022–23
