= Stiven Plaza =

Ecuadoran footballer (born 1999)

Personal information
- Full name: Stiven Ricardo Plaza Castillo
- Date of birth: 11 March 1999 (age 27)
- Place of birth: Eloy Alfaro, Ecuador
- Height: 1.88 m (6 ft 2 in)
- Position: Forward

Team information
- Current team: Real Potosí
- Number: 91

Youth career
- 2011–2016: Norte América
- 2014: → Deportivo Azogues (loan)
- 2015: → Deportivo Azogues (loan)
- 2016: → Aucas (loan)
- 2017–2018: Independiente del Valle

Senior career*
Years	Team	Apps	(Gls)
2018	Independiente del Valle	22	(7)
2018	→ Alianza Cotopaxi (loan)	0	(0)
2019–2022	Valladolid	2	(0)
2019–2020	Valladolid B	11	(1)
2020–2021	→ Trabzonspor (loan)	2	(0)
2021–2022	→ Independiente del Valle (loan)	8	(0)
2022	New York Red Bulls II	7	(1)
2023	Aucas	2	(0)
2023	Guayaquil City	7	(0)
2024	Mazatlán	2	(0)
2024	→ Venados (loan)	13	(2)
2025	Oțelul Galați	3	(0)
2025–2026	Chindia Târgoviște	15	(3)
2026–	Real Potosí	6	(1)

International career
2018–2019	Ecuador U20	3	(0)
2018	Ecuador	2	(0)
Medal record
Men's football
Representing Ecuador
FIFA U-20 World Cup
Third place	2019 Poland
- * Club domestic league appearances and goals as of 12 September 2026

Stiven Ricardo Plaza Castillo (born 11 March 1999) is an Ecuadorian professional footballer who plays as a forward for Bolivian Primera División club Real Potosí.

== Club career ==
=== Independiente del Valle ===
Born in Eloy Alfaro Canton, Plaza started his career with Norte América in 2011, as a left winger. In 2017, after stints at Deportivo Azogues and Aucas, he joined Independiente del Valle and was a regular starter in the club's under-18 squad.

Converted to a forward by Juan Carlos León, Plaza made his senior debut during the 2018 season with Alianza Cotopaxi, the club's reserve team. After scoring 7 goals in 3 games in the 2018 U-20 Copa Libertadores, he was reportedly being watched by scouts of the Premier League sides Manchester City and Manchester United.

Plaza made his professional – and Serie A – debut on 11 June 2018, coming on as a late substitute in a 1–1 away draw against Universidad Católica. He scored his first goal on 12 August, netting his team's third in a 3–1 home win against Emelec.

On 23 October 2018, Plaza scored a brace in a 2–0 away defeat of Técnico Universitario.

=== Valladolid ===
On 10 December 2018, Spain's Real Valladolid confirmed a pre-contract with Plaza to join the club once the transfer window opened on 1 January 2019. Then, Plaza made his debut with Valladolid on 16 February 2019, in a 1–0 away loss against Barcelona. On 25 August 2019, Plaza scored his first goal in Europe, helping Real Valladolid Promesas to a 4–1 victory over CD Izarra in a Segunda División B match.

==== Trabzonspor (loan) ====
On 17 August 2020, Plaza was loaned to Turkish side Trabzonspor for two seasons. On 26 September 2020, Plaza made his debut with Trabzonspor in 3–1 victory over Yeni Malatyaspor. He appeared in only three official matches with the club.

==== Independiente del Valle (loan) ====
After struggling to fulfill his promise, Valladolid loaned Plaza to his former club Independiente del Valle during February 2021.

=== New York Red Bulls ===
On 30 August 2022, Valladolid announced the transfer of Plaza to New York Red Bulls. He was initially assigned to New York Red Bulls II. He made his debut for New York Red Bulls II on 31 August 2022, coming on late in the match in a 3–3 draw versus Hartford Athletic. On 10 October 2022, Plaza scored his first goal for New York in a 2–1 loss to Memphis 901 FC.

=== Guayaquil City ===
He joined Guayaquil City in July 2023 after a brief spell with SD Aucas. It was his fifth club in four years.

== International career ==
On 4 October 2018, Plaza was called up by Ecuador manager Hernán Darío Gómez for friendlies against Qatar and Oman. He made his full international debut eight days later, starting in a 4–3 loss against the former at the Jassim Bin Hamad Stadium in Doha.

== Career statistics ==
=== Club ===
As of 14 April 2026

Appearances and goals by club, season and competition
Club	Season	League			National cup (Note: Includes Turkish Cup, Cupa României)		Continental		Other		Total	
Club	Season	Division	Apps	Goals	Apps	Goals	Apps	Goals	Apps	Goals	Apps	Goals
Alianza Cotopaxi	2018	Ecuadorian Segunda Categoría	0	0	—		—		7 (Note: Appearance(s) in Campeonato Provincial de Segunda Categoría de Cotopaxi)	8	7	8
Independiente del Valle	2018	Ecuadorian Serie A	22	7	—		—		—		22	7
Real Valladolid	2018–19	La Liga	2	0	0	0	—		—		2	0
Valladolid B	2019–20	Segunda División B	11	1	—		—		—		11	1
Trabzonspor (loan)	2020–21	Süper Lig	2	0	1	0	—		—		3	0
Independiente del Valle (loan)	2021	Ecuadorian Serie A	5	0	—		0	0	0	0	5	0
Independiente del Valle (loan)	2022	Ecuadorian Serie A	3	0	—		1 (Note: Appearance in Copa Libertadores)	0	—		4	0
Independiente del Valle (loan)	Total		8	0	—		1	0	0	0	9	0
New York Red Bulls II	2022	USL Championship	7	1	—		—		—		7	1
Aucas	2023	Ecuadorian Serie A	2	0	—		0	0	0	0	2	0
Guayaquil City	2023	Ecuadorian Serie A	7	0	—		—		—		7	0
Mazatlán	2023–24	Liga MX	2	0	—		—		—		2	0
Venados (loan)	2024–25	Liga de Expansión MX	13	2	0	0	—		—		13	2
Oțelul Galați	2024–25	Liga I	3	0	—		—		—		3	0
Chindia Târgoviște	2025–26	Liga II	15	3	2	0	—		—		17	3
Real Potosí	2026	FBF División Profesional	6	1	3	0	—		—		9	1
Career total			100	15	6	0	1	0	7	8	114	23

=== International ===
As of match played 16 October 2018

National team	Year	Apps	Goals
Ecuador	2018	2	0
Total		2	0

== Honours ==
Independiente del Valle

- Ecuadorian Serie A: 2021

Aucas

- Supercopa Ecuador runner-up: 2023

Ecuador U20

- FIFA U-20 World Cup third place: 2019
