= El Viso del Alcor =

- city
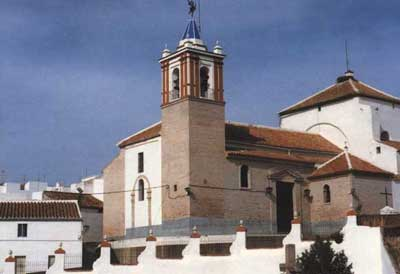
- Church of Santa María del Alcor

- Flag Coat of arms

- Location in Spain El Viso del Alcor (Andalusia) El Viso del Alcor (Spain)
- Coordinates: 37°23′N 5°43′W
- Country: Spain
- Autonomous community: Andalusia
- Province: Seville
- Comarca: Los Alcores

Government
  - Mayor: Anabel Burgos

Area
  - Total: 20.40 km^{2} (7.88 sq mi)
- Elevation: 143 m (469 ft)

Population (2025-01-01)
  - Total: 19,458
  - Density: 953.8/km^{2} (2,470/sq mi)
- Demonym: Visueños
- Time zone: UTC+1 (CET)
  - Summer (DST): UTC+2 (CEST)
- Website: Official website

El Viso del Alcor is a city located in the province of Seville, Spain. As of 2018, the city has a population of 19,191 inhabitants.

== History ==
=== Prehistory-Ancient Age ===
Settlements in the area were first established in the Neolithic period.

The Punic built defensive towers to protect fields and roads, in addition to serving as a refuge for the population in case of danger. The subsequent romanization of the Iberian peninsula (1st century BCE onwards) caused the towns loyal to the Punic side to succumb to the Roman Empire, as is the case of El Viso, where it became the location where the villas of the large Hispano-Roman landowners or rustic villas are located. An example of this are the remains found in the sites of La Estación, El Alcaudete, Casita de Mortero, La Alunada, La Santa, and El Moscoso.

=== Middle Ages ===
The Viso begins, after the fall of the Roman Empire (4th - 5th centuries), to pay homage to the Visigothic monarchy prevailing in the Peninsula. The Muslim conquest of the Peninsula (712 AD) made the population of the area mostly of Berber origin (in addition to Hispanic), merging both cultures and producing the birth of the first Viso, as a consequence of the large population concentration in a high place (hill or alcor) in front of the Christian outposts of the time.

The Christians, in their siege of the city of Seville from 1246 to 1248, carried out the looting of the area of Los Alcores, so the fields of Carmona and its surrounding areas were cut down and looted, with the consequent great deforestation that the region suffers. El Viso was taken on August 12, 1246 (festival of San Eusebio), its inhabitants surrendering and then enjoying their properties and practicing their religions and customs, within the Señorío de Carmona. However, the mixed repopulation system failed when the Mudejar uprising occurred in 1264, leading to widespread depopulation in the area. However, the Crown worked hard at the end of the 13th century to repopulate the area, because it was located on the border line, with important towers and fortresses for its defense, consolidating population centers in Carmona and Mairena (El Viso practically disappeared, being reduced to a simple rural property). Thus, Carmona decided, in the first half of the 14th century, to repopulate El Viso so that Mairena would not take over more of the land than she was entitled to.

After the confrontation between Pedro I (legitimate heir of Alfonso), among other places, of El Viso, which was granted after various events that occurred between 1382 and 1390 to Doña Elvira de Guzmán, widow of the Master of the Order of Santiago, Don Gonzalo Mexía. Thus, in 1399 it was already his property.

The history of El Viso in the 15th century is bizarre, passing through several hands, since the heirs of Doña Isabel Mexía (daughter of Don Gonzalo and Doña Elvira) sold, before 1415, half of the place to Doña María de Mendoza, who donated his part in 1415 to his son Gómez Suárez de Figueroa, who bought the other half in 1417 from the heirs of Doña Isabel Mexía. Later, Gómez Suárez and his wife María de Torquemada sold, in 1422, one part to Diego Rivera, and the other to Joaquín Fernández de Mendoza, who sold his part to Pedro Ponce de León, Lord of Mairena, at the end of this same year.

The latter sold his share to Diego de Rivera and his wife Beatriz de Portocarrero, who since 1424 were the only lords of El Viso, until King Juan II changed, in 1430, the towns of Cañete La Real and Torre de Alháquime to change of this town, then passing to Royal jurisdiction, and consequently to Carmona. Between 1430 and 1440, this king granted the place of El Viso to Juan Arias de Saavedra (his faithful vassal in the War of Granada), then Alfaqueque Mayor of Castile and Mayor and Alguacil Mayor of Seville and Alcalá de Guadaíra, counting the place of half a league in length.

However, this area between the years 1441 and 1444 was not achieved, as the Council of Carmona opposed it, so both parties reached an agreement in 1444, with El Viso having less space than promised, but in exchange it enjoyed administrative emancipation and religious, Community of pastures with Carmona and freedom of passage and taxes with Seville, so the residents of El Viso could move freely with their livestock, cut firewood, pick asparagus and enjoy pastures, water, hunting, firewood, watering holes and other usufructs of the neighboring town.

This Lord of El Viso, Don Juan Arias de Saavedra, is of vital importance, since in addition to giving him his own and independent term, he gives him legal unity, by creating a Mayorazgo in 1456 between him and his wife Doña Juana de Avellaneda, which would pass into 1496 to his first-born son Fernán Arias de Saavedra. Later in 1540, his successor, Juan Arias de Saavedra, I Count of Castellar and his wife María Pérez de Guzmán y Manuel, granddaughter of the I Duke of Medina Sidonia, founded a majority for his second-born son Juan de Saavedra, I Lord of Moscoso, on the lands of the current farmhouse of Moscoso, leaving the title of Count of Castellar and Lord of El Viso in his brother Fernando, as well as the rest of the current municipal area.

=== Modern Age ===
It was at this time that the first Council or Town Hall of El Viso was created, which was definitively constituted in the mid-15th century. The government of the town was then in charge of two Ordinary Mayors, a Bailiff and two Aldermen, who constituted the Council, Justice and Regiment of the Villa; the Lord, on the other hand, appointed the Mayor or Governor to look after his interests and control the Civil Council. This Cabildo, on the other hand, was dedicated to watching over the source, the market, the boundary, the delimitation of the meadow, the properties and their fruits, and morality and religiosity. Thus, Juan de Saavedra granted some municipal ordinances that regulated life and social relations in the small community; As for the power of the Church, it is already evident that, in addition to other obligations, all persons over 15 years of age had to go to Mass after the bells had been belled, and those who failed to comply with it were punished with imprisonment and a fine of one real.

Since the end of the sixteenth century, the population of Visua has had a warehouse to store grain to cope with shortages in periods of famine, located in the Plaza Sacristán Guerrero, which was moved in the eighteenth century to the Town Hall on Calle Real. In these centuries (14th to 18th centuries), the population enjoyed a high birth rate, most of them dedicated to agriculture (there are olive groves and vineyards in the Alcor, and wheat, barley and cereals are sown in the Vega), and a small part carried out artisan work, tasks of a liberal nature, muleteers, bakers, shopkeepers and regatones or recoveros (who went to Seville and Carmona to sell bread and local products). This shows the intense commercial activity that the town experienced at the time, which was favoured in the eighteenth century by the construction of the new road that led from Madrid to Cadiz (from the reef or the ports).

The religious character of the population of Visua at the time led to the founding of different kinds of brotherhoods in the town, both Sacramental (worshipping the Blessed Sacrament), Animas (they make suffrages to save souls from purgatory), Glory (such as the Rosary), and Penance (they make a Station of Penance to Calvary, such as that of Solitude, of the Holy True Cross, or that of Jesus of Nazareth). Likewise, throughout the year a series of festivals were held in the town, most of them of a religious nature, such as: Epiphany. Manifestation, at the beginning of the year, of the offering of the Three Wise Men to the Child Jesus. Saint Sebastian (patron saint of the town until 1630).

Pilgrimage to the hermitage of La Santa on January 20. Carnival, popular festival, prelude to Holy Week. Santa María del Alcor, religious and popular festivities, celebrated on March 25. Holy Week, the culminating feast of the Church, which began on Palm Sunday with the Procession of Palms, on Holy Wednesday Altars were placed in the Church, Mass and visit to the Monument on Holy Thursday, processions with flagellants on Good Friday, and ringing of bells on Holy Saturday. Cruz de Mayo, liturgical acts are held in honour of the Holy Cross (represented in the Lignum Crucis), and popular festivities are held through luminaries and bonfires. Corpus Christi, a feast where the royal presence of Jesus in the Blessed Sacrament was worshipped, celebrated in the month of June. Santiago, a festival in honour of the patron saint of Spain, celebrated in August. Assumption of the Virgin, feast in the month of August in honor of the Virgin Mary. San Miguel, festivities celebrated in September in honour of this saint (the weather vane of the Church has an image in his honour). Feast of the Dead, the whole month of November was dedicated. Immaculate Conception, celebration of the Conceptionist Dogma on December 8, with luminary vespers being held in her honor (popular "bonfires"). Apart from these, when the birth of an Infante took place, the coronation of a King, the arrival of the Lords to El Viso... Celebrations were organized in his honor.

=== Contemporary Age ===
In the 19th - 20th centuries, the City Council continued to collect taxes from residents, both contributions and products and at collection points where they charged for the entry of goods into the town, which were located on La Muela street. Carmona street, Cruz del Moro and the Huerta de don Víctor alley. In exchange, it offered a series of services to the Visueños, which improved the life of the community, such as: The market, which in 1907 opened a central place for commercial activity, and in the seventies a new one was inaugurated. The slaughterhouse, created in the last third of the 19th century, eradicating a large part of the poor hygienic-sanitary conditions of the population. Health, the City Council went from maintaining a doctor and a midwife for the service of the community since the 19th century, to installing a municipal office for the service of charity. The cemetery, which at the end of the 18th century was already moved from its old enclave on the outskirts of the Parish (with the people accommodated in the temple being buried), to the area immediately close to the hermitage of San Sebastián, until 1882 when it passed to its current location, with the patron of the cemetery being Don Manuel Jiménez León from Visueño (with the condition that no corpse of a person who had not professed the Catholic Religion be exhumed).

Throughout the 19th century, an incipient agrarian bourgeoisie was born in El Viso, which monopolized political and economic power, manifesting its opulence by building magnificent palace-houses in the central streets, where they also had places for recreation, such as taverns, shows. .. in front of the huge mass of day laborers, dispossessed of any source of wealth, and a small group of day laborers who own tiny inheritances (with "sovereignties" in the houses to store the grains of the harvest).

Throughout the 20th century, the large number of small landowners and peasants (compared to the nobility and bourgeoisie who concentrate the ownership of the land) suffer suffering and continuous crises, which is why the City Council and the wealthy residents of the town help them. . Thus, streets, roads, and squares are fixed to give them salaries and alleviate the situation of these braceros.

The disentailment process that was carried out against the Church in the 19th century had a negative influence on the town's Brotherhoods, losing the splendor of yesteryear or many even disappearing. It is at the end of the 20th century, when Holy Week in Visueña resurfaces with force, with several Brotherhoods taking part in processions: La Borriquita on Palm Sunday, founded in 1980, with the passage of the Sacred Entry of Jesus into Jerusalem and the Virgin of Peace under canopy On Holy Wednesday the Brotherhood of the Captive processions, with Our Lady. Father Jesús Cautivo and the Virgin of Bitterness, which was founded in 1972. In 1940 the Brotherhood of the Vera-Cruz was founded, which processions on Holy Thursday with the Christ of the Vera-Cruz and the Virgin of the Rosary. La Piedad, in the Madrugá, founded in 1980 and whose Mystery is processed in a single step. Our. Father Jesús Nazareno and the Virgen del Mayor Dolor process on Good Friday morning. The Brotherhood of the Nazarene was founded in the 17th century. On Good Friday in the afternoon the Brotherhood of Sorrows processions, founded in 1923, and which is merged with the Sacramental Brotherhood (created in 1557), featuring the Christ of Love and the Virgin of Sorrows.

The Festivals that are celebrated throughout the year have changes depending on the historical period through which they take place. Thus, in the 20th century, celebrations such as: Tree Festival took place in El Viso, which was celebrated by Royal Decree, through tree plantations in the town. In 1937 it stopped being celebrated, resuming at the end of the century. Three Kings Parade, the first was held in 1965, with ups and downs until the Popular Athenaeum was established. San Sebastián, a pilgrimage without a saint, with "bambas" (swings for girls to play on) in the vicinity of the Alcaudete farmhouse. Profane festival, celebrated until the 1950s.

Carnival, prelude to Holy Week, was important but disappeared in 1936, without being revitalized. It was extrapolated to New Year's Eve, when neighbors dress up to say goodbye to the year. Holy Week, which is fully consolidated after the Civil War. May Cross, in the last third of the 19th century was renewed, becoming a popular festival, more lacking in the original religious meaning. At the beginning of the 20th century, bullfights were held in a permanent bullring, although the religious character did not decline, with a Solemn Mass and procession with the Lignum Crucis being held until 1936. The location of the festivities, for its part, varied through different locations. throughout the century. Corpus Christi, by Pontifical Brief from the late 17th century - early 18th century, was celebrated in the afternoon, until the 1980s, when it was held at dawn, until today. Pilgrimage, Santa María del Alcor was the patron saint of El Viso and Mairena, and a Function was held in her honor on March 25, attended by the entire Municipal Corporation. In 1940, the Brotherhood of the Patroness, Honorary Mayor of the town already at that time, was founded, the day of its celebration being September 12 (which replaces the 8th of this month). The Pilgrimage is celebrated in his honor, with the people heading to the Alcaudete hermitage.

When the civil war began in 1936, the mayor was Luciano Cuevas León, one of the few mayors who survived the war in the province of Seville.

The town experienced development in the 1970s. Places of interest in the town include the Parque de la Constitución (a park and leisure area), the Plaza de la Recovera (erected in honor of working women), Calle Real (with its stately houses), the streets of the historic center (with slopes and curves from its Arab past), the Church and Convent of Corpus Christi (with a late-baroque main altarpiece in the first and a cloister as the axis of the second, current Town Hall), the Parish Church (from the end of the 15th century, with later additions), the neo-Gothic tower of the old Town Hall (from the 19th century), and the Parque de La Muela (a park with a viewpoint that overlooks La Vega).

== Demographics ==
The municipality of El Viso del Alcor has 19,324 inhabitants according to the 2020 population census published by the INE, of which 9,651 are men and 9,673 are women.

Historical population

Year	Pop.	±%
1998	15,918	—
1999	16,036	+0.7%
2000	16,170	+0.8%
2001	16,276	+0.7%
2002	16,355	+0.5%
2003	16,597	+1.5%
2004	16,805	+1.3%
2005	17,194	+2.3%
2006	17,497	+1.8%
2007	17,714	+1.2%
2008	18,059	+1.9%

Year	Pop.	±%
2009	18,351	+1.6%
2010	18,641	+1.6%
2011	18,828	+1.0%
2012	18,990	+0.9%
2013	19,020	+0.2%
2014	19,119	+0.5%
2015	19,149	+0.2%
2016	19,168	+0.1%
2017	19,234	+0.3%
2018	19,191	−0.2%
2019	19,266	+0.4%

Source: INE-es

== Administration ==
=== Mayor's Office ===
Mayors since 1979
Legislature	Name	Political party
1979–1983	Juan Holgado Calderón	
1983–1987	Juan Holgado Calderón	
1987–1991	José Calabuig Fernández	
1991–1995	Juan Holgado Calderón	miniaturadeimagen
1995–1999	Francisco José Vergara Huertas	
1999–2003	Francisco José Vergara Huertas	
2003–2007	Manuel García Benítez	
2007–2011	Manuel García Benítez	
2011–2015	Manuel García Benítez	
2015–2019	Anabel Burgos Jiménez	
2019-2023	Gabriel Santos Bonilla	
2023-	Gabriel Santos Bonilla	

=== Elections 2019 ===
Elections to the City Council of El Viso del Alcor
- May 26, 2019

Party	PSOE-A El Viso	IU El Viso	PP-El Viso
Popular vote	5,405	2,305	2,500
Percentage	53.32	22.74	13.62
Party	El Viso Citizens	VOX El Viso del Alcor
Popular vote	657	280
Percentage	6.48	2.76

In investiture vote Absolute majority: 9/17
Candidate/s	Votes
Gabriel Santos	10 (PSOE)

== Educational offer ==
In El Viso del Alcor there are currently 5 (public) schools for early childhood and primary education:

- C.E.I.P. Mayor León Ríos
- C.E.I.P. Albaicin
- C.E.I.P. King Juan Carlos I
- C.E.I.P. Gil Lopez
- C.E.I.P. The Alunada

In addition, there are 2 secondary education institutes:

- I.E.S. Professor Juan Bautista
- I.E.S. Blas Infante

The I.E.S. Blas Infante we can find bachelor's degrees in Sciences, Social and Humanities. In addition to the aforementioned types of baccalaureates in said educational institute we can also obtain the graduate of medium-level training cycles in Care for People in a Situation of Dependency and Business Administration and Management. And it must also be added that in I.E.S. Professor Juan Bautista there is FPb (previously called P.C.P.I.) of Gardening and Botany.

== Gastronomy ==
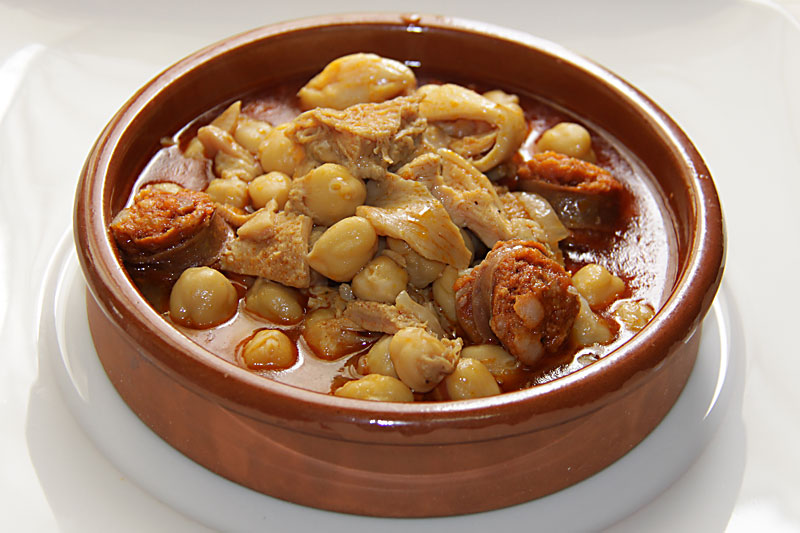
Slight

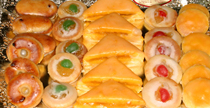
Chests

A typical dish in this town is Menudo. Made with pork, El Viso's Menudo has become an important tourist attraction.

Another aspect to highlight about Visueño gastronomy is its pastries. The cupcakes and pechugones were said to be the favorite sweets of Alfonso XIII when he visited Seville.

== Culture ==
- Brotherhood of Dolores

== See also ==
- List of municipalities in Seville
