= Nikola Stevanović (footballer) =

Serbian footballer

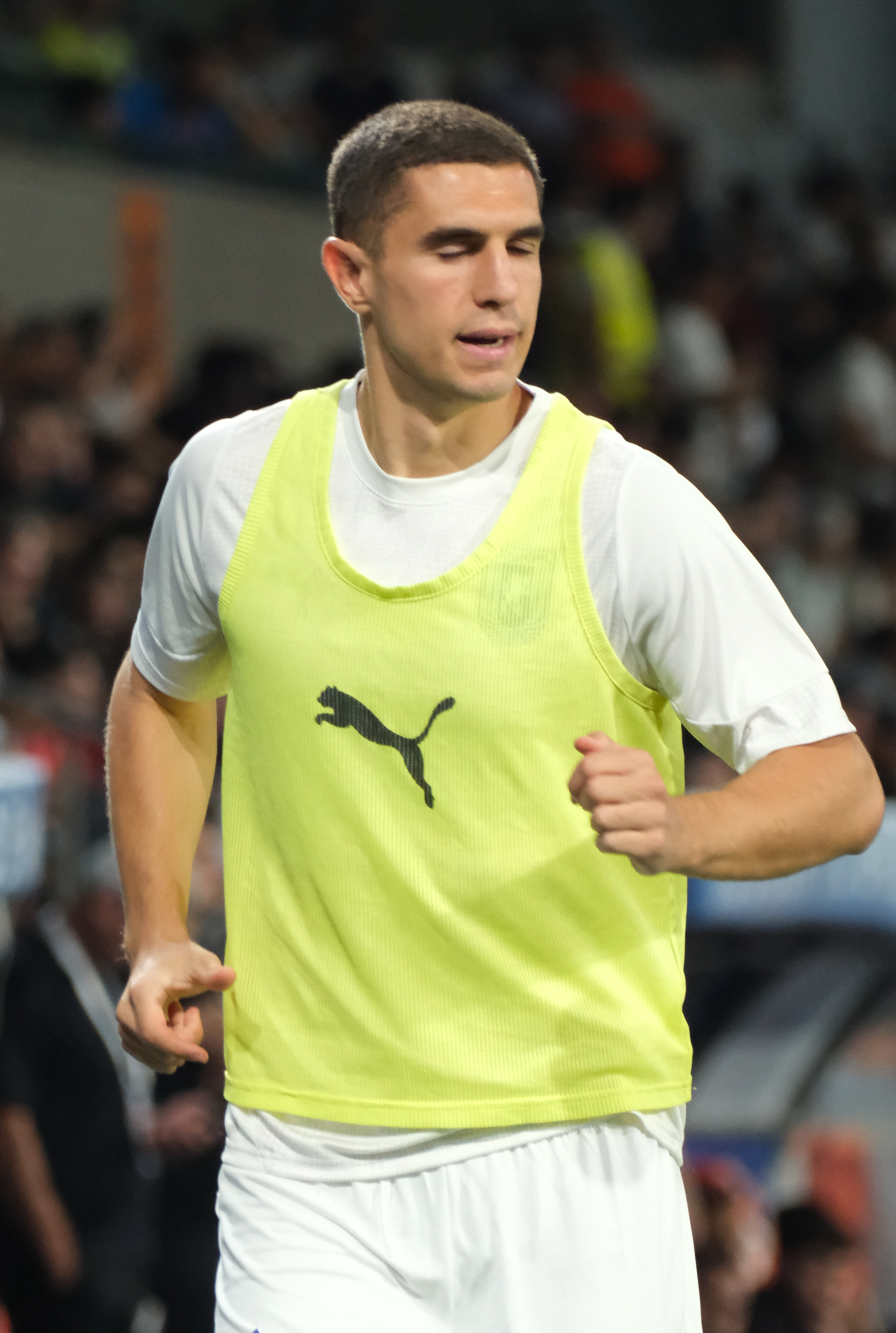
- Nikola Stevanović with Universitatea Craiova in 2025.

Personal information
- Date of birth: 13 September 1998 (age 28)
- Place of birth: Niš, FR Yugoslavia
- Height: 1.90 m (6 ft 3 in)
- Position: Centre-back

Team information
- Current team: Universitatea Craiova
- Number: 24

Youth career
- Naša krila Belotinac
- –2009: Filip Filipović Niš
- 2009–2017: Radnički Niš

Senior career*
Years	Team	Apps	(Gls)
2016–2021	Radnički Niš	80	(2)
2018–2019	→ Dinamo Vranje (loan)	22	(0)
2022–2023	FC Ingolstadt	15	(0)
2022–2023	FC Ingolstadt II	4	(0)
2023–2024	Napredak Kruševac	17	(0)
2024–2025	Oțelul Galați	35	(1)
2025–	Universitatea Craiova	28	(2)

International career
2016	Serbia U18	4	(0)
2021	Serbia	1	(0)
- * Club domestic league appearances and goals as of 1 November 2026

Nikola Stevanović (Serbian Cyrillic: Никола Стевановић; born 13 September 1998) is a Serbian professional footballer who plays as a centre-back for Liga I club Universitatea Craiova.

== Club career ==
=== Radnički Niš ===
Born in Niš, Stevanović started training football with Naša krila Belotinac and later spent some period in the "Filip Filipović" youth school. He joined youth categories of Radnički Niš at the age of 11. As a member of youth squad, Stevanović joined the first team under coach Milan Rastavac for the spring half of 2015–16 season. He noted his senior debut in the Serbian Cup match against Partizan, played on 2 March 2016. Later, he also made SuperLiga in 29 fixture match against Vojvodina. Stevanović signed his first three-year professional contract with Radnički Niš on 19 July 2016. In summer 2018, Stevanović moved on a six-month loan to Dinamo Vranje.

=== FC Ingolstadt ===
On 10 January 2022, Stevanović moved to FC Ingolstadt in German 2. Bundesliga. On 27 July 2023, his contract with Ingolstadt was terminated by mutual consent.

=== Napredak Kruševac ===
On 6 September 2023, Stevanović signed with Napredak Kruševac.

== International career ==
Stevanović was invited in Serbia under-18 national team squad in March 2016 under coach Milan Kosanović. He noted 4 appearances for the team. He had also been called in Serbian under-19 level in October same year.

== Career statistics ==
=== Club ===
As of 5 November 2026

Appearances and goals by club, season and competition
Club	Season	League			National cup (Note: Includes Serbian Cup, Cupa României)		Europe		Other		Total	
Club	Season	Division	Apps	Goals	Apps	Goals	Apps	Goals	Apps	Goals	Apps	Goals
Radnički Niš	2015–16	Serbian SuperLiga	1	0	1	0	—		—		2	0
Radnički Niš	2016–17	Serbian SuperLiga	2	0	0	0	—		—		2	0
Radnički Niš	2017–18	Serbian SuperLiga	6	0	0	0	—		—		6	0
Radnički Niš	2019–20	Serbian SuperLiga	20	1	3	1	0	0	—		23	2
Radnički Niš	2020–21	Serbian SuperLiga	33	1	1	0	—		—		34	1
Radnički Niš	2021–22	Serbian SuperLiga	18	0	0	0	—		—		18	0
Radnički Niš	Total		80	2	5	1	0	0	—		85	3
Dinamo Vranje (loan)	2018–19	Serbian SuperLiga	22	0	1	0	—		2 (Note: Appearances in Serbian SuperLiga relegations play-off)	0	25	0
FC Ingolstadt	2021–22	2. Bundesliga	6	0	—		—		—		6	0
FC Ingolstadt	2022–23	3. Liga	9	0	0	0	—		—		9	0
FC Ingolstadt	Total		15	0	0	0	—		—		15	0
FC Ingolstadt II	2022–23	Bayernliga Süd	2	0	—		—		—		2	0
FC Ingolstadt II	2023–24	Bayernliga Nord	2	0	—		—		—		2	0
FC Ingolstadt II	Total		4	0	—		—		—		4	0
Napredak Kruševac	2023–24	Serbian SuperLiga	17	0	1	0	—		—		18	0
Oțelul Galați	2024–25	Liga I	35	1	0	0	—		—		35	1
Universitatea Craiova	2025–26	Liga I	15	1	3	0	6 (Note: Appearances in UEFA Conference League)	0	—		24	1
Universitatea Craiova	2026–27	Liga I	13	1	2	0	8 (Note: Three appearances in UEFA Champions League, two appearances in UEFA Europa League, three appearances in UEFA Conference League)	0	1 (Note: Appearance in Supercupa României)	0	24	1
Universitatea Craiova	Total		28	2	5	0	14	0	1	0	48	2
Career total			201	5	12	1	14	0	3	0	230	6

=== International ===
As of match played 25 January 2021

Appearances and goals by national team and year
National team	Year	Apps	Goals
Serbia	2021	1	0
Total		1	0

== Honours ==
Universitatea Craiova

- Liga I: 2025–26
- Cupa României: 2025–26
- Supercupa României: 2026
