= Filip Blažek =

Slovak footballer (born 1998)

Personal information
- Date of birth: 11 March 1998 (age 28)
- Place of birth: Skalica, Slovakia
- Height: 1.88 m (6 ft 2 in)
- Positions: Centre-back; defensive midfielder

Team information
- Current team: DAC 1904
- Number: 26

Youth career
- 2005–2008: TJ Kopčany
- 2008–2016: Senica

Senior career*
Years	Team	Apps	(Gls)
2016–2017	Senica	19	(1)
2017–2019	Brøndby	1	(0)
2019	→ Skalica (loan)	13	(2)
2019–2023	Skalica	96	(5)
2023–2024	Baník Ostrava	20	(1)
2024–2025	Rapid București	5	(1)
2025	→ Unirea Slobozia (loan)	13	(1)
2025–	DAC 1904	29	(2)

International career
2016–2017	Slovakia U19	7	(0)
2018	Slovakia U20	1	(0)
- * Club domestic league appearances and goals as of 21 September 2026

Filip Blažek (born 11 March 1998) is a Slovak professional footballer who plays as a centre-back or a defensive midfielder for Niké liga club DAC 1904.

== Career ==
=== Senica ===
Blažek made his professional debut for Senica against AS Trenčín on 23 July 2016.

=== Brøndby ===
On 11 July 2017, Brøndby announced they had reached an agreement with Senica for the transfer of Blažek, after he had impressed on a tryout. Blažek signed a three-year contract, receiving the number 26 shirt.

Blažek made his first league appearance for Brøndby on 1 March 2018 against Midtjylland replacing Simon Tibbling in the stoppage time.

=== Skalica ===
On 25 January 2019 Skalica announced, that they had signed Blažek from Brøndby on loan for the rest of the season. Brøndby announced on 19 July 2019, that they had sold Blažek permanently to Skalica.

=== Baník Ostrava ===
On 23 June 2023, Baník Ostrava announced they had reached an agreement with Skalica and signed with Blažek a three-year contract.

=== Rapid Bucureşti ===
On 28 June 2024, Blažek was transferred from Ostrava to Rapid Bucureşti.

=== DAC 1904 ===
On 22 August 2025, Blažek had joined Slovak First Football League side DAC 1904 on a deal until June 2027.

== Honours ==
Brøndby

- Danish Cup: 2017–18
