= Maksym Kovalyov (footballer, born 2000) =

Ukrainian footballer

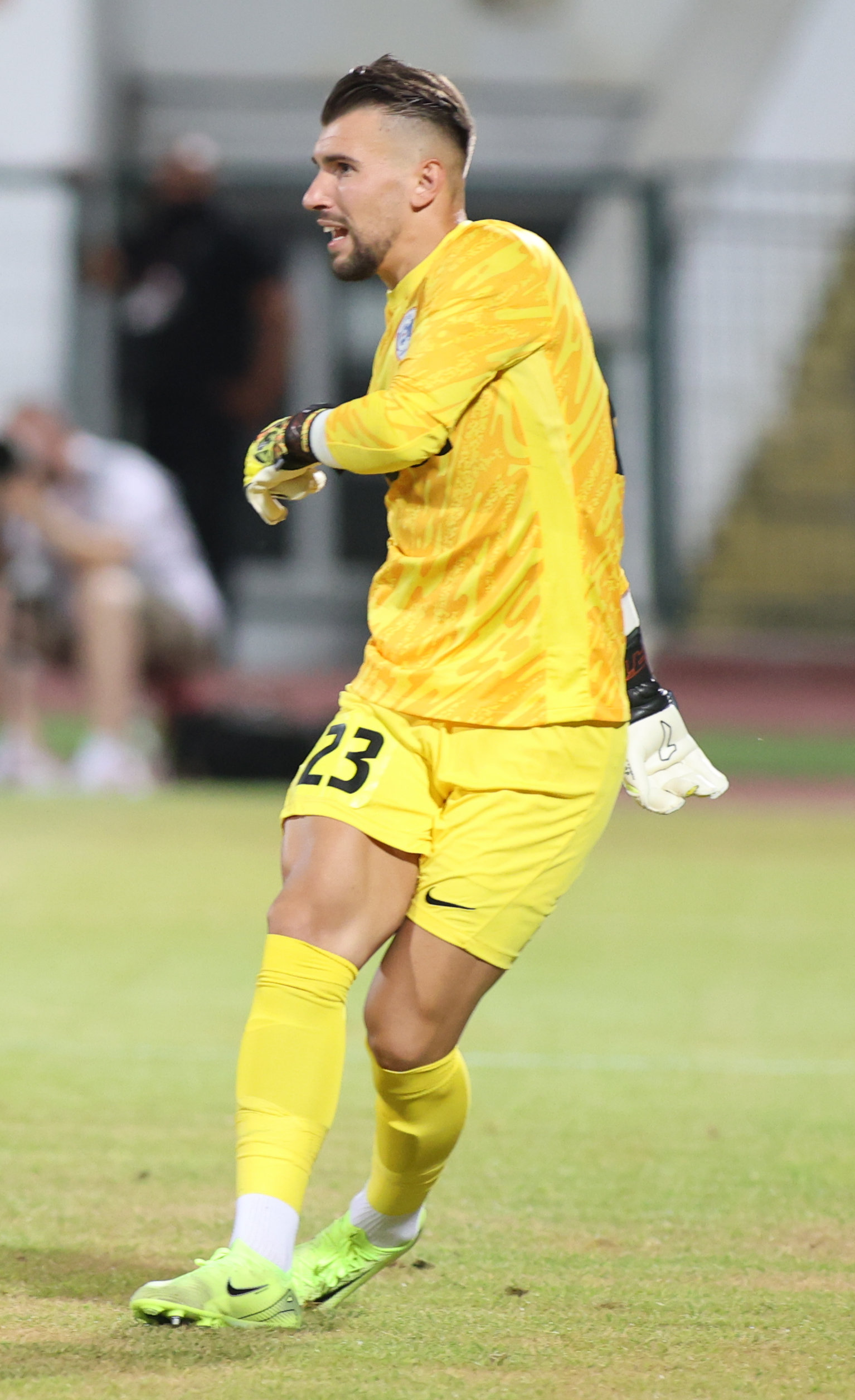

Personal information
- Full name: Maksym Yuriyovych Kovalyov
- Date of birth: 11 July 2000 (age 26)
- Place of birth: Odesa, Ukraine
- Height: 1.86 m (6 ft 1 in)
- Position: Goalkeeper

Team information
- Current team: Spartak Varna
- Number: 23

Youth career
- 2013–2017: Chornomorets Odesa

Senior career*
Years	Team	Apps	(Gls)
2018–2021	Zimbru Chișinău	42	(0)
2021	Viktoriya Mykolaivka	0	(0)
2021–2022	Krystal Kherson	20	(0)
2022	Peremoha Dnipro	0	(0)
2022–2024	Pirin Blagoevgrad	45	(0)
2024	Oțelul Galați	0	(0)
2025–	Spartak Varna	30	(0)
- * Club domestic league appearances and goals as of 07:57, 11 May 2026 (UTC)

Maksym Yuriyovych Kovalyov (Ukrainian: Максим Юрійович Ковальов; born 11 July 2000) is a Ukrainian professional footballer who plays as a goalkeeper for Bulgarian First League club Spartak Varna.

== Career ==
In March 2022, after the Russian invasion of Ukraine, Kovalyov moved from Peremoha Dnipro to Bulgarian team Pirin Blagoevgrad together with Vyacheslav Velyev. He become a first choice goalkeeper for the 2023–24 season, which led to interest from Bulgarian and Ukrainian teams.

== Personal life ==
Kovalyov is of Bessarabian Bulgarian descent.
