= Vasilije Đurić =

Serbian footballer

Personal information
- Date of birth: 18 July 1998 (age 28)
- Place of birth: Subotica, FR Yugoslavia
- Height: 1.76 m (5 ft 9 in)
- Position: Midfielder

Youth career
- 2009–2011: Radnički Sombor
- 2012–2016: Red Star Belgrade
- 2016–2017: OFK Beograd

Senior career*
Years	Team	Apps	(Gls)
2017–2018	OFK Beograd	33	(4)
2018–2021	Sinđelić Beograd	52	(12)
2020–2021	→ TSC Bačka Topola (loan)	23	(1)
2021	→ Inđija (loan)	19	(1)
2021–2022	Metalac Gornji Milanovac	50	(7)
2023–2024	Radnički Kragujevac	46	(6)
2024–2025	Oțelul Galați	16	(0)
2025–2026	Velež Mostar	47	(6)
- * Club domestic league appearances and goals as of 11 June 2026

Vasilije Đurić (Serbian Cyrillic: Василије Ђурић; born 18 July 1998) is a Serbian professional footballer who plays as a central midfielder.

== Honours ==
Individual

- Serbian SuperLiga Player of the Week: 2022–23 (Round 26), 2023–24 (Round 31)
