= Stipe Jurić =

Bosnian footballer

Personal information
- Date of birth: 19 November 1998 (age 27)
- Place of birth: Tomislavgrad, Bosnia and Herzegovina
- Height: 1.83 m (6 ft 0 in)
- Position: Forward

Team information
- Current team: Varaždin
- Number: 9

Youth career
- 2011–2017: Široki Brijeg

Senior career*
Years	Team	Apps	(Gls)
2018–2021	Široki Brijeg	76	(19)
2021–2024	ŁKS Łódź	60	(11)
2021–2024	ŁKS Łódź II	13	(3)
2024–2025	Oțelul Galați	20	(3)
2025	CFR Cluj	8	(0)
2025–2026	Levadiakos	5	(1)
2026–	Varaždin	6	(1)

International career
2016	Bosnia and Herzegovina U19	2	(0)
2018–2019	Bosnia and Herzegovina U21	2	(1)
- * Club domestic league appearances and goals as of 15 June 2026

Stipe Jurić (born 19 November 1998) is a Bosnian professional footballer who plays as a forward for Croatian Football League club Varaždin.

== Career ==
In June 2024, Jurić joined Romanian Liga I club Oțelul Galați.

On 7 January 2025, he moved to fellow top-flight side CFR Cluj.

== Honours ==
Široki Brijeg

- Bosnia and Herzegovina Cup runner-up: 2018–19

ŁKS Łódź

- I liga: 2022–23

ŁKS Łódź II

- III liga, group I: 2022–23

CFR Cluj

- Cupa României: 2024–25
