= Victor Bogaciuc =

Moldovan footballer (born 1999)

Personal information
- Date of birth: 17 October 1999 (age 27)
- Place of birth: Rezina, Moldova
- Height: 1.85 m (6 ft 1 in)
- Position: Midfielder

Team information
- Current team: Petrocub Hîncești
- Number: 79

Youth career
- –2018: Zimbru Chișinău

Senior career*
Years	Team	Apps	(Gls)
2018–2020	Zimbru Chișinău	11	(0)
2020–2023	Petrocub Hîncești	78	(8)
2023–2024	Chindia Târgoviște	19	(4)
2024–2025	Oțelul Galați	0	(0)
2025–	Petrocub Hîncești	36	(7)

International career^{‡}
2015	Moldova U17	1	(0)
2017	Moldova U19	7	(0)
2019–2020	Moldova U21	1	(0)
2021–	Moldova	21	(4)
- * Club domestic league appearances and goals as of 1 June 2026 ‡ National team caps and goals as of 17 November 2026

Victor Bogaciuc (born 17 October 1999) is a Moldovan professional footballer who plays as a midfielder for Moldovan Liga club Petrocub Hîncești and the Moldova national team.

== International career ==
He made his Moldova national football team debut on 1 September 2021 in a World Cup qualifier game against Austria, a 0–2 home loss. He substituted Radu Gînsari in the 59th minute.

=== International stats ===
As of match played 16 November 2026

Appearances and goals by national team and year
National team	Year	Apps	Goals
Moldova	2021	2	0
Moldova	2022	1	0
Moldova	2023	4	0
Moldova	2024	5	2
Moldova	2025	5	1
Moldova	2026	4	2
Total		21	4

=== International goals ===
Scores and results list Moldova's goal tally first.

#	Date	Venue	Opponent	Score	Result	Competition
1	26 March 2024	Mardan Sports Complex, Antalya, Turkey	Cayman Islands	4–0	4–0	Friendly
2	8 June 2024	Zimbru Stadium, Chișinău, Moldova	Cyprus	3–2	3–2	Friendly
3.	5 June 2026	Zimbru Stadium, Chișinău, Moldova	Bulgaria	1–1	2–2	Friendly
4.	9 June 2026	Vazgen Sargsyan Republican Stadium, Yerevan, Armenia	Armenia	1–1	1–1	Friendly

== Honours ==
Petrocub Hîncești

- Cupa Moldovei: 2019–20
