= 2027 UEFA European Under-21 Championship qualification Group A =

Football tournament qualification stage

Group A of the 2027 UEFA European Under-21 Championship qualifying competition consists of six teams: Spain, Romania, Finland, Kosovo, Cyprus, and San Marino. The composition of the nine groups in the qualifying group stage was decided by the draw held on 6 February 2025 at the UEFA headquarters in Nyon, Switzerland, with the teams seeded according to their coefficient ranking.

== Standings ==
| Pos | Team | Pld | W | D | L | GF | GA | GD | Pts | Qualification | Spain | Finland | Romania | Kosovo | Cyprus | San Marino |
|---|---|---|---|---|---|---|---|---|---|---|---|---|---|---|---|---|
| 1 | Spain | 10 | 9 | 0 | 1 | 47 | 5 | +42 | 27 | Final tournament | — | 2–1 | 7–1 | 2–0 | 3–0 | 7–0 |
| 2 | Finland | 10 | 7 | 2 | 1 | 34 | 7 | +27 | 23 | Play-offs | 2–1 | — | 2–0 | 0–0 | 3–0 | 7–0 |
| 3 | Romania | 10 | 5 | 1 | 4 | 12 | 13 | −1 | 16 | | 0–2 | 0–2 | — | 0–0 | 2–0 | 3–0 |
| 4 | Kosovo | 10 | 4 | 3 | 3 | 21 | 11 | +10 | 15 | | 1–3 | 4–4 | 0–1 | — | 2–1 | 7–0 |
| 5 | Cyprus | 10 | 2 | 0 | 8 | 8 | 29 | −21 | 6 | | 0–7 | 0–5 | 0–3 | 0–4 | — | 2–0 |
| 6 | San Marino | 10 | 0 | 0 | 10 | 0 | 57 | −57 | 0 | | 0–13 | 0–8 | 0–2 | 0–3 | 0–5 | — |

Source: UEFA
Rules for classification: Tiebreakers

== Matches ==
Times are CET/CEST, (Note: CEST (UTC+2) for matches until 26 October 2025 and from 29 March 2026 (matchday 1–3 and 7–10), and CET (UTC+1) for matches from 26 October 2025 to 29 March 2026 (matchday 4–6).) as listed by UEFA (local times, if different, are in parentheses).

4 September 2025
16:00 (17:00 UTC+3)

| Finland | 7–0 | San Marino |
|---|---|---|
| Ruoppi 13'; Svanbäck 20', 54', 63'; Lähteenmäki 33'; Ylitolva 87'; Ezeh 90' | Report |

Veritas Stadion, Turku
Attendance: 2,084
Referee: Seth Galia (Gibraltar)
5 September 2025
17:30 (18:30 UTC+3)

| Romania | 0–0 | Kosovo |
|---|---|---|
| | Report |

Emil Alexandrescu Stadium, Iași
Attendance: 8,565
Referee: Mehmet Türkmen (Turkey)
5 September 2025
20:00

| Spain | 3–0 | Cyprus |
|---|---|---|
| Obrador 45+1'; Gasiorowski 74'; P. García 85' | Report |

Los Pajaritos, Soria
Attendance: 2,369
Referee: Mateo Erceg (Croatia)

9 September 2025
18:00 (19:00 UTC+3)

| Cyprus | 0–5 | Finland |
|---|---|---|
| | Report | Svanbäck 7'; Söderbäck 17', 30'; Ruoppi 69'; Mentu 89' |

Antonis Papadopoulos Stadium, Larnaca
Attendance: 170
Referee: Antoni Bandić (Bosnia and Herzegovina)
9 September 2025
19:00

| Kosovo | 1–3 | Spain |
|---|---|---|
| Hasani 22' | Report | Roca 11'; Bravo 70'; Niño 90+5' |

Fadil Vokrri Stadium, Pristina
Attendance: 3,500
Referee: Martin Matoša (Slovenia)
9 September 2025
20:30

| San Marino | 0–2 | Romania |
|---|---|---|
| | Report | Biliboc 11'; Trică 87' |

San Marino Stadium, Serravalle
Attendance: 354
Referee: Antoine Chiaramonti (Andorra)

14 October 2025
18:00 (19:00 UTC+3)

| Romania | 2–0 | Cyprus |
|---|---|---|
| Trică 4'; Burnete 74' | Report |

CFR Cluj Stadium, Cluj-Napoca
Attendance: 5,831
Referee: Ladislav Szikszay (Czech Republic)
14 October 2025
18:00

| Kosovo | 7–0 | San Marino |
|---|---|---|
| Bujupi 12'; Frokaj 16', 84'; Berisha 20', 60'; L. Jashari 63'; Selmonaj 76' | Report |

Fadil Vokrri Stadium, Pristina
Attendance: 602
Referee: Jasmin Sabotic (Luxembourg)
14 October 2025
18:30

| Spain | 2–1 | Finland |
|---|---|---|
| Mayenda 90'; G. García 90+3' | Report | Gasiorowski 65' (o.g.) |

Nou Estadi Castàlia, Castellón
Attendance: 3,628
Referee: Radoslav Gidzhenov (Bulgaria)

14 November 2025
20:45

| Spain | 7–0 | San Marino |
|---|---|---|
| Virgili 19', 52'; Carvalho 45+1'; Bravo 68'; Guiu 76'; Rodríguez 79'; P. García 87' | Report |

Estadio Anxo Carro, Lugo
Attendance: 4,065
Referee: Emanuela Rusta (Albania)
14 November 2025
16:00 (17:00 UTC+2)

| Finland | 2–0 | Romania |
|---|---|---|
| Ruoppi 23'; Siltanen 73' (pen.) | Report |

Veritas Stadion, Turku
Attendance: 1,503
Referee: Dario Bel (Croatia)
14 November 2025
18:00 (19:00 UTC+2)

| Cyprus | 0–4 | Kosovo |
|---|---|---|
| | Report | Bujupi 16', 61'; Frokaj 45+4' (pen.); Shala 90+1' |

Dasaki Stadium, Dasaki Achnas
Attendance: 130
Referee: Mateo Erceg (Croatia)

18 November 2025
17:30 (18:30 UTC+2)

| Finland | 0–0 | Kosovo |
|---|---|---|
| | Report |

Veritas Stadion, Turku
Attendance: 2,109
Referee: David Šmajc (Slovenia)
18 November 2025
18:00 (19:00 UTC+2)

| Romania | 0–2 | Spain |
|---|---|---|
| | Report | G. García 17'; Fresneda 53' |

Sibiu Municipal Stadium, Sibiu
Attendance: 9,732
Referee: Matteo Marchetti (Italy)
18 November 2025
18:00

| San Marino | 0–5 | Cyprus |
|---|---|---|
| | Report | Vrontis 14'; Andreou 45'; Papastylianou 56'; Athanasiou 63'; Neofytou 90+2' |

San Marino Stadium, Serravalle
Attendance: 165
Referee: Ilioski Vlatko (North Macedonia)

26 March 2026
18:00

| San Marino | 0–8 | Finland |
|---|---|---|
| | Report | Semprini 17' (o.g.); Söderbäck 26', 57'; Siltanen 41'; Ciacci 59' (o.g.); Helén 62', 82'; Lötjönen 64' |

San Marino Stadium, Serravalle
Attendance: 196
Referee: Luka Bilbija (Bosnia and Herzegovina)
27 March 2026
16:00 (17:00 UTC+2)

| Cyprus | 0–7 | Spain |
|---|---|---|
| | Report | Mills 28' (o.g.); G. García 48', 60'; López 57'; Mayenda 70'; Niño 74'; Roca 90+3' |

AEK Arena – Georgios Karapatakis, Larnaca
Attendance: 350
Referee: Mathieu Vernice (France)
27 March 2026
19:00

| Kosovo | 0–1 | Romania |
|---|---|---|
| | Report | Vermeșan 66' |

Fadil Vokrri Stadium, Pristina
Attendance: 350
Referee: Iwan Griffith (Wales)

31 March 2026
17:00 (18:00 UTC+3)

| Finland | 3–0 | Cyprus |
|---|---|---|
| Siltanen 21' (pen.); Talvitie 57'; Tauriainen 88' | Report |

Tammelan Stadion, Tampere
Attendance: 1,891
Referee: Jóhann Ingi Jónsson (Iceland)
31 March 2026
18:00 (19:00 UTC+3)

| Romania | 3–0 | San Marino |
|---|---|---|
| Musi 43', 58'; Mazilu 63' | Report |

Eugen Popescu Stadium, Târgoviște
Attendance: 1,755
Referee: Artem Gasparyan (Armenia)
31 March 2026
19:00

| Spain | 2–0 | Kosovo |
|---|---|---|
| G. García 71'; P. García 90+4' | Report |

Centro Deportivo Wanda Alcalá de Henares, Madrid
Attendance: 2,318
Referee: Joakim Östling (Sweden)

24 September 2026
20:30

| San Marino | 0–3 | Kosovo |
|---|---|---|
| | Report | Ademi 28', 59'; Xhylani 62' |

San Marino Stadium, Serravalle
Attendance: 233
Referee: David Fuxman (Israel)

25 September 2026
17:30 (18:30 UTC+3)

| Finland | 2–1 | Spain |
|---|---|---|
| Ruoppi 9'; Ylitolva 66' | Report | Ramón 86' |

Tammelan Stadion, Tampere
Attendance: 7,386
Referee: Gergo Bogár (Hungary)
25 September 2026
18:00 (19:00 UTC+3)

| Cyprus | 0–3 | Romania |
|---|---|---|
| | Report | Vermeșan 34' (pen.), 44'; Ciubotaru 89' |

AEK Arena – Georgios Karapatakis, Larnaca
Attendance: 262
Referee: Lukáš Dzivjak (Slovakia)

30 September 2026
18:00 (19:00 UTC+3)

| Romania | 0–2 | Finland |
|---|---|---|
| | Report | Hyryläinen 28'; Mero 85' |

Eugen Popescu Stadium, Târgoviște
Attendance: 4,336
Referee: Dario Bel (Croatia)
30 September 2026
19:00

| Kosovo | 2–1 | Cyprus |
|---|---|---|
| Berisha 69' (pen.); Jashari 76' | Report | Kontopoulos 52' |

Fadil Vokrri Stadium, Pristina
Attendance: 980
Referee: Robin Hensgens (Netherlands)
1 October 2026
20:15

| San Marino | 0–13 | Spain |
|---|---|---|
| | Report | Mendoza 9'; P. García 25', 90+6'; Ramón 32'; Espí 34', 52', 62', 68', 74'; Gasiorowski 42'; Virgili 46', 69'; Martín 85' |

San Marino Stadium, Serravalle
Attendance: 721
Referee: Bulat Sariyev (Kazakhstan)

6 October 2026
19:00

| Spain | 7–1 | Romania |
|---|---|---|
| P. García 34', 45', 47'; Gasiorowski 51'; G. García 44', 53'; Bravo 64' (pen.) | Report | Burnete 27' |

Estadi Municipal de Can Misses, Ibiza
Attendance: 3,750
Referee: Matteo Marcenaro (Italy)
6 October 2026
19:00 (20:00 UTC+3)

| Cyprus | 2–0 | San Marino |
|---|---|---|
| Poursaitidis 18'; Kyriacou 81' | Report |

AEK Arena – Georgios Karapatakis, Larnaca
Attendance: 127
Referee: Ilioski Vlatko (North Macedonia)
6 October 2026
19:00

| Kosovo | 4–4 | Finland |
|---|---|---|
| Gashi 15', 57'; Shala 38'; Ademi 84' | Report | Lötjönen 34'; Söderbäck 48'; Seji 74' (o.g.); Helén 90' |

Fadil Vokrri Stadium, Pristina
Attendance: 530
Referee: Lukasz Kuzma (Poland)

== Goalscorers ==
There were 122 goals scored in 30 matches, for an average of 4.07 goals per match.

8 goals

- (Spain national under-21 football team) Pablo García

7 goals

- (Spain national under-21 football team) Gonzalo García

5 goals

- (Finland national under-21 football team) Marius Söderbäck
- (Spain national under-21 football team) Carlos Espí

4 goals

- (Finland national under-21 football team) Otto Ruoppi
- (Finland national under-21 football team) Adrian Svanbäck
- (Spain national under-21 football team) Jan Virgili

3 goals

- (Finland national under-21 football team) Onni Helén
- (Finland national under-21 football team) Matias Siltanen
- (Kosovo national under-21 football team) Faton Ademi
- (Kosovo national under-21 football team) Hekuran Berisha
- (Kosovo national under-21 football team) Eliot Bujupi
- (Kosovo national under-21 football team) Leon Frokaj
- (Romania national under-21 football team) Ioan Vermeșan
- (Spain national under-21 football team) Iker Bravo
- (Spain national under-21 football team) Yarek Gasiorowski

2 goals

- (Finland national under-21 football team) Arttu Lötjönen
- (Finland national under-21 football team) Miska Ylitolva
- (Kosovo national under-21 football team) Medin Gashi
- (Kosovo national under-21 football team) Lirim Jashari
- (Kosovo national under-21 football team) Lendrit Shala
- (Romania national under-21 football team) Rareș Burnete
- (Romania national under-21 football team) Alexandru Musi
- (Romania national under-21 football team) Atanas Trică
- (Spain national under-21 football team) Eliezer Mayenda
- (Spain national under-21 football team) Adrián Niño
- (Spain national under-21 football team) Jacobo Ramón
- (Spain national under-21 football team) Joel Roca

1 goal

- (Cyprus national under-21 football team) Panagiotis Andreou
- (Cyprus national under-21 football team) Andreas Athanasiou
- (Cyprus national under-21 football team) Savvas Kontopoulos
- (Cyprus national under-21 football team) Kyriakos Kyriakou
- (Cyprus national under-21 football team) Angelos Neofytou
- (Cyprus national under-21 football team) Lysandros Papastylianou
- (Cyprus national under-21 football team) Konstantinos Poursaitidis
- (Cyprus national under-21 football team) Stylianos Vrontis
- (Finland national under-21 football team) David Ezeh
- (Finland national under-21 football team) Luka Hyryläinen
- (Finland national under-21 football team) Juho Lähteenmäki
- (Finland national under-21 football team) Pyry Mentu
- (Finland national under-21 football team) Toivo Mero
- (Finland national under-21 football team) Juho Talvitie
- (Finland national under-21 football team) Jimi Tauriainen
- (Kosovo national under-21 football team) Arianit Hasani
- (Kosovo national under-21 football team) Julind Selmonaj
- (Kosovo national under-21 football team) Laurent Xhylani
- (Romania national under-21 football team) Lorenzo Biliboc
- (Romania national under-21 football team) Kevin Ciubotaru
- (Romania national under-21 football team) Adrian Mazilu
- (Spain national under-21 football team) Miguel Carvalho
- (Spain national under-21 football team) Iván Fresneda
- (Spain national under-21 football team) Marc Guiu
- (Spain national under-21 football team) Fer López
- (Spain national under-21 football team) Mario Martín
- (Spain national under-21 football team) Rodri Mendoza
- (Spain national under-21 football team) Rafael Obrador
- (Spain national under-21 football team) Jesús Rodríguez

1 own goal

- (Cyprus national under-21 football team) Harry Mills (against Spain)
- (Kosovo national under-21 football team) Laurent Seji (against Finland)
- (San Marino national under-21 football team) Mattia Ciacci (against Finland)
- (San Marino national under-21 football team) Nicolò Semprini (against Finland)
- (Spain national under-21 football team) Yarek Gasiorowski (against Finland)
