= Spain national under-21 football team =

Football team of Spain

Spain U-21
- Nickname: La Rojita (The Little Red One)
- Association: Real Federación Española de Fútbol (RFEF)
- Confederation: UEFA (Europe)
- Head coach: David Gordo
- Most caps: Gerard Deulofeu (36)
- Top scorer: Gerard Deulofeu (17)
- FIFA code: ESP
First colours	Second colours

First international
- Yugoslavia 4–1 Spain (Zagreb, Yugoslavia; 9 October 1976)

Biggest win
- Spain 14–0 San Marino (El Ejido, Spain; 8 February 2005)

Biggest defeat
- Netherlands 5–0 Spain (Utrecht, Netherlands; 16 February 1983) Records for competitive matches only.

UEFA U-21 Championship
- Appearances: 17 (first in 1982)
- Best result: Winners (1986, 1998, 2011, 2013, 2019)
Medal record
Spain national under-21 football team
Medal record
U-21 European Championship
Gold medal – first place	1986	Team
Gold medal – first place	1998 Romania	Team
Gold medal – first place	2011 Denmark	Team
Gold medal – first place	2013 Israel	Team
Gold medal – first place	2019 Italy	Team
Silver medal – second place	1984	Team
Silver medal – second place	1996 Spain	Team
Silver medal – second place	2017 Poland	Team
Silver medal – second place	2023 Georgia–Romania	Team
Bronze medal – third place	1994 France	Team
Bronze medal – third place	2000 Slovakia	Team

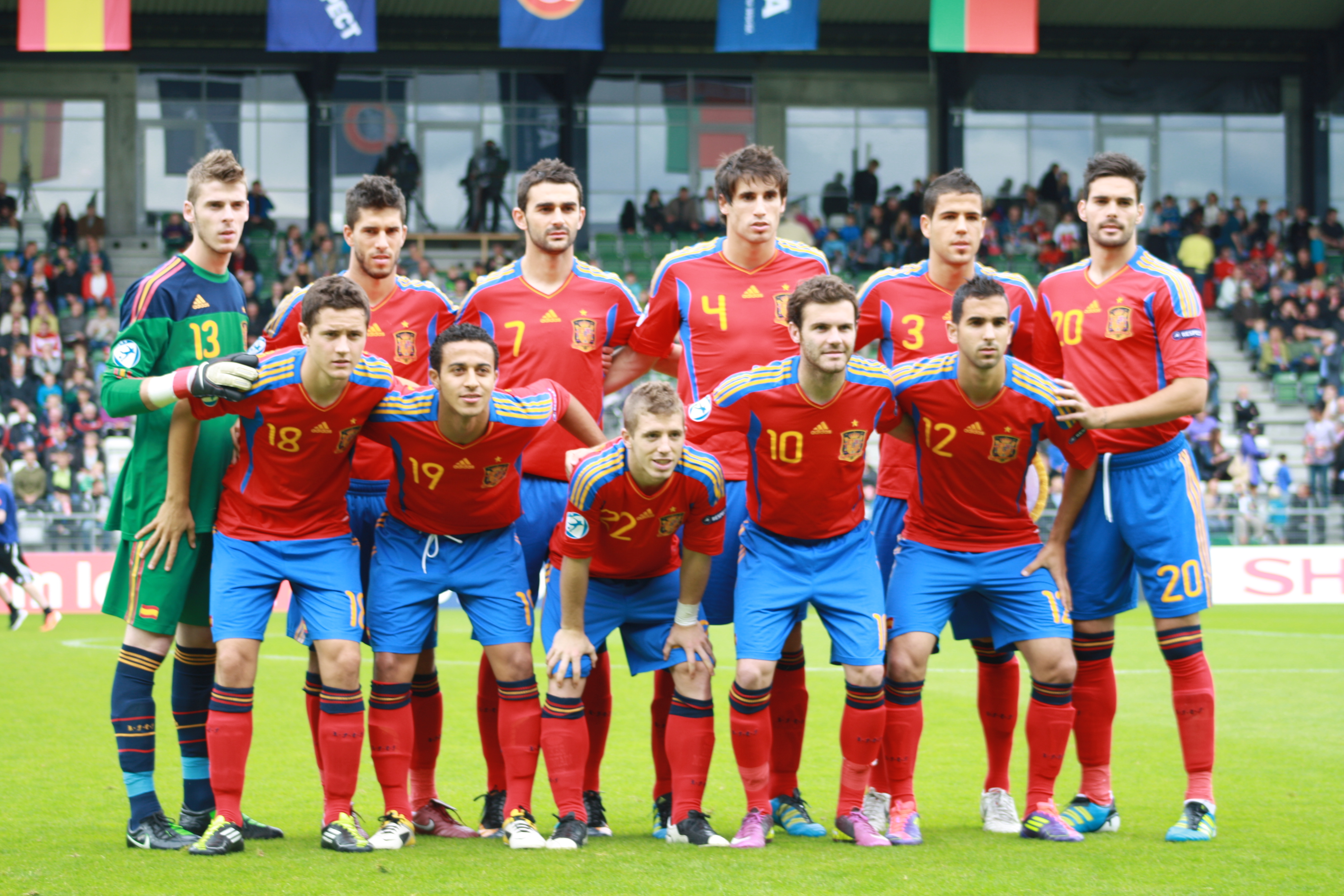
The 2011 winning team

The Spain national under-21 football team is the national under-21 football team of Spain and is controlled by the Royal Spanish Football Federation. The team, nicknamed La Rojita (The Little Red), competes in the biennial UEFA European Under-21 Championship.

Following the realignment of UEFA's youth competitions in 1976, the Spain under-21 team was formed. Spain has a strong record (competition winners five times and runners-up twice); having consecutively won the 2011 and 2013 Championships. They hold the joint record with Italy for the most wins of the competition.

Since the under-21 competition rules insist that players must be 21 or under at the start of a two-year competition, technically it is an U-23 competition. For this reason, Spain's brief record in the preceding U-23 competitions is also shown, though in actuality, Spain played only three competitive U-23 matches. The first was in the "under-23 Challenge", which they lost, while the next two were in a two-team qualification "group" for the 1972 competition (facing the Soviet Union team, they lost 2–1 at home then drew 1–1 away and failed to qualify. Spain did not enter a team in the other two U-23 competitions, but have been ever present in under-21 competitions).

Spain's youth development programs has been challenging the South American dominance in the FIFA U-17 World Championship and the FIFA U-20 World Cup. In fact, 20 of the Spanish 23-man squad that won the Euro 2008 came through the ranks of the youth teams; most of them had won titles at the youth level as well.

== Competitive record ==
=== UEFA European Under-21 Championship record ===
Year	Round	GP	W	D*	L	GS	GA
1978	Qualifying Stage	4	2	0	2	5	8
1980	Qualifying Stage	4	1	2	1	4	2
1982	Quarter-finals	6	5	0	1	14	5
1984	Runners-up	10	5	2	3	11	11
1986	Champions	10	7	1	2	18	9
1988	Quarter-finals	8	4	2	2	10	4
1990	Quarter-finals	6	4	0	2	5	4
1992	Qualifying Stage	7	3	2	2	6	5
(France) 1994	Third Place	12	9	2	1	21	9
(Spain) 1996	Runners-up	14	10	3	1	34	14
(Romania) 1998	Champions	11	10	1	0	21	6
(Slovakia) 2000	Third Place	14	11	3	0	31	7
(Switzerland) 2002	Qualification Playoffs	10	6	1	3	15	9
(Germany) 2004	Qualification Playoffs	10	6	2	2	17	5
(Portugal) 2006	Qualifying Stage	10	6	2	2	37	8
(Netherlands) 2007	Qualification Playoffs	4	2	1	1	8	4
(Sweden) 2009	Group Stage	13	10	1	2	27	7
(Denmark) 2011	Champions	15	12	2	1	31	8
(Israel) 2013	Champions	15	14	1	0	47	5
(Czech Republic) 2015	Qualification Playoffs	10	7	2	1	25	8
(Poland) 2017	Runners-up	15	11	2	2	43	12
(Italy) 2019	Champions	15	13	0	2	45	16
(Hungary) (Slovenia) 2021	Semifinals	15	12	2	1	27	3
(Romania) (Georgia (country)) 2023	Runners-up	13	12	1	1	50	10
(Slovakia) 2025	Quarter-finals	14	11	2	1	35	12
Total	17/25	252	181	36	35	537	181

*Denotes draws including knockout matches decided on penalty kicks.

- Gold background color indicates first-place finish. Silver background color indicates second-place finish. Bronze background color indicates third-place finish.
- Red border color indicates tournament was held on home soil.

== Individual awards ==
Spanish players have won individual awards at UEFA European Under-21 Football Championship.

Year	Golden Player	Golden Boot
(Europe) 1986	Manolo Sanchís	
(Romania) 1998	Francesc Arnau	
(Denmark) 2011	Juan Mata	Adrián
(Israel) 2013	Thiago	Álvaro Morata
(Poland) 2017	Dani Ceballos	Saúl
(Italy) (San Marino) 2019	Fabián Ruiz	
(Georgia (country)) (Romania) 2023		Sergio Gómez

== Player records ==
=== Top appearances ===
Rank	Player	Club(s)	Year(s)	U-21 Caps
1	Gerard Deulofeu	Barcelona, Everton, Sevilla, Milan	2012–2017	36
2	Borja Mayoral	Real Madrid, VfL Wolfsburg, Levante	2015–2019	31
	Jorge Meré	Sporting Gijón, FC Köln	2015–2019	31
	Iker Muniain	Athletic Bilbao	2011–2014	31
5	Dani Ceballos	Betis, Real Madrid	2015–2019	29
	Beñat Turrientes	Real Sociedad	2021–2025	29
7	Santi Denia	Albacete, Atlético Madrid	1992–1996	27
	David de Gea	Atlético Madrid, Manchester United	2009–2013	27
	Abel Ruiz	Barcelona, Sporting Braga	2019–2023	27
10	Diego Capel	Sevilla	2007–2011	25
	Mikel Oyarzabal	Real Sociedad	2017–2019	25
	Saúl	Atlético Madrid, Rayo Vallecano	2013–2017	25
	Xavi	Barcelona	1998–2001	25

Note: Club(s) represents all the clubs that players played in at the time they did it too in the Under-21s.

=== Top goalscorers ===
Rank	Player	Club(s)	Year(s)	U-21 Goals
1	Gerard Deulofeu	Barcelona, Everton, Sevilla, Milan	2012–2017	17
2	Borja Mayoral	Real Madrid, VfL Wolfsburg, Levante	2015–2019	16
3	Rodrigo	Benfica	2011–2013	15
4	Isco	Málaga, Real Madrid	2011–2014	14
5	Álvaro Morata	Real Madrid, Juventus	2013–2014	13
	Abel Ruiz	Barcelona, Sporting Braga	2019–2023	13
7	Óscar	Barcelona, Albacete	1992–1996	12
8	Munir	Barcelona	2014–2016	10
9	Pablo Couñago	Celta, Recreativo, Ipswich Town	1999–2001	9
	Adrián	Deportivo, Alavés, Málaga, Atlético Madrid	2007–2011	9
	Saúl	Atlético Madrid, Rayo Vallecano	2013–2017	9

Note: Club(s) represents all the clubs that players played in at the time they did it too in the Under-21s.

- Caps and goals correct as of 21 June 2025.

== Recent results ==
Date	Competition	Location	Opponent	Result	Scorers
14 November 2025	2027 UEFA U-21 qualification	Lugo, Spain	San Marino	7–0	Virgili 19', 52', Miguel Carvalho 45', Iker Bravo 68', Guiu 76', Jesús Rodríguez 79', Pablo García 87'
18 November 2025	2027 UEFA U-21 qualification	Sibiu, Romania	Romania	2–0	Gonzalo 17', Fresneda 53'
27 March 2026	2027 UEFA U-21 qualification	Larnaca, Cyprus	Cyprus	7–0	Mills 28' (o.g.), Gonzalo 48', 60', Fer López 57', Mayenda 70', Adrián Niño 74', Joel Roca 90+3'
31 March 2026	2027 UEFA U-21 qualification	Alcalá de Henares, Spain	Kosovo	2–0	Gonzalo 71', Pablo García 90+4'
25 September 2026	2027 UEFA U-21 qualification	Tampere, Finland	Finland	1–2	Ramón 86'
1 October 2026	2027 UEFA U-21 qualification	Serravalle, San Marino	San Marino	13–0	Mendoza 9', Pablo García 25', 90+6', Ramón 32', Espí 34', 52', 62', 68', 74', Gasiorowski 42', Virgili 46', 69', Mario Martín 85'
6 October 2026	2027 UEFA U-21 qualification	Ibiza, Spain	Romania	7–1	Pablo García 34', 45', 47', Gasiorowski 51', Gonzalo 44', 53', Bravo 64' (pen.)

== Forthcoming fixtures ==
Date	Competition	Location	Opponent

== 2027 UEFA European Under-21 Championship ==
=== Group phase ===
Pos	Team	Pld	W	D	L	GF	GA	GD	Pts	Qualification	Spain	Finland	Romania	Kosovo	Cyprus	San Marino
1	Spain	10	9	0	1	47	5	+42	27	Final tournament	—	2–1	7–1	2–0	3–0	7–0
2	Finland	10	7	2	1	34	7	+27	23	Play-offs	2–1	—	2–0	0–0	3–0	7–0
3	Romania	10	5	1	4	12	13	−1	16		0–2	0–2	—	0–0	2–0	3–0
4	Kosovo	10	4	3	3	21	11	+10	15		1–3	4–4	0–1	—	2–1	7–0
5	Cyprus	10	2	0	8	8	29	−21	6		0–7	0–5	0–3	0–4	—	2–0
6	San Marino	10	0	0	10	0	57	−57	0		0–13	0–8	0–2	0–3	0–5	—

Source: UEFA
Rules for classification: Tiebreakers

== Players ==
Players born in 2004 or later are eligible for the 2027 UEFA European Under-21 Championship. Players in bold have been already capped with the senior team.

=== Current squad ===
The following players were named in the squad for the 2027 UEFA European Under-21 Championship qualification Group A matches against Finland, San Marino and Romania on 25, 30 September and 6 October 2026; respectively.

Caps and goals as of 6 October 2026, after the match against Romania.

No.	Pos.	Player	Date of birth (age)	Caps	Goals	Club
	GK	Salvi Esquivel	30 September 2005 (age 21)	4	0	(Royal Spanish Football Federation) Atlético Madrid
	GK	Fran González	24 June 2005 (age 21)	3	0	(Royal Spanish Football Federation) Sevilla
	GK	Bruno Iribarne	18 August 2004 (age 22)	1	0	(Royal Spanish Football Federation) Burgos
	DF	Álex Valle	25 April 2004 (age 22)	8	0	(Italian Football Federation) Como
	DF	Yarek Gasiorowski	12 January 2005 (age 21)	7	3	(Royal Dutch Football Association) PSV Eindhoven
	DF	Rafael Obrador	24 February 2004 (age 22)	7	1	(Italian Football Federation) Sassuolo
	DF	**Jon Martín**	23 April 2006 (age 20)	6	0	(Royal Spanish Football Federation) Real Sociedad
	DF	Jacobo Ramón	6 January 2005 (age 21)	5	2	(Italian Football Federation) Como
	DF	Juanma Herzog	13 May 2004 (age 22)	5	0	(Royal Spanish Football Federation) Las Palmas
	DF	**Iván Fresneda**	28 September 2004 (age 22)	4	1	(Portuguese Football Federation) Sporting CP
	DF	Ángel Ortiz	25 July 2004 (age 22)	4	0	(Royal Spanish Football Federation) Real Betis
	DF	Rafita Garrido	9 November 2004 (age 22)	2	0	(Royal Spanish Football Federation) Málaga
	DF	Xavi Espart	21 May 2007 (age 19)	2	0	(Royal Spanish Football Federation) Barcelona
	MF	Rodri Mendoza	15 March 2005 (age 21)	7	1	(Royal Spanish Football Federation) Atlético Madrid
	MF	Chema Andrés	25 April 2005 (age 21)	7	0	(The Football Association) Brighton & Hove Albion
	MF	Peio Canales	17 January 2005 (age 21)	7	0	(Royal Spanish Football Federation) Athletic
	MF	Fer López	24 May 2004 (age 22)	5	1	(The Football Association) Wolverhampton Wanderers
	MF	Mario Martín	5 March 2004 (age 22)	5	1	(Royal Spanish Football Federation) Getafe
	MF	**Marc Bernal**	26 May 2007 (age 19)	4	0	(Royal Spanish Football Federation) Barcelona
	FW	**Gonzalo García**	24 March 2004 (age 22)	10	8	(The Football Association) Fulham
	FW	**Jesús Rodríguez**	21 November 2005 (age 20)	10	2	(Italian Football Federation) Como
	FW	Iker Bravo	13 January 2005 (age 21)	9	3	(The Football Association) Watford
	FW	Pablo García	13 June 2006 (age 20)	8	7	(Royal Spanish Football Federation) Real Betis
	FW	Jan Virgili	26 July 2006 (age 20)	6	4	(Royal Belgian Football Association) Club Brugge
	FW	Carlos Espí	24 July 2005 (age 21)	2	5	(Royal Spanish Football Federation) Real Madrid
	FW	Chupe	24 August 2004 (age 22)	1	0	(Royal Spanish Football Federation) Málaga
	FW	Javi Hernández	30 January 2004 (age 22)	0	0	(Royal Spanish Football Federation) Espanyol

=== Recent call-ups ===
The following players have been called up within the last twelve months are still eligible for selection.

Pos.	Player	Date of birth (age)	Caps	Goals	Club	Latest call-up
GK	Vicent Abril	15 February 2005 (age 21)	0	0	(Spain) Valencia	v. Kosovo, 31 March 2026
DF	Álex Jiménez	8 May 2005 (age 21)	4	0	(Italy) Fiorentina	v. Kosovo, 31 March 2026
DF	Sergi Domínguez	1 April 2005 (age 21)	0	0	(Croatia) Dinamo Zagreb	v. Kosovo, 31 March 2026
DF	**Cristhian Mosquera** (captain)	27 June 2004 (age 22)	15	0	(England) Arsenal	v. Romania, 18 November 2025
MF	Dani Requena	12 February 2004 (age 22)	2	0	(Spain) Levante	v. Kosovo, 31 March 2026
MF	Miguel Carvalho	9 March 2005 (age 21)	3	2	(Saudi Arabia) Al-Hazem	v. Romania, 18 November 2025
FW	Eliezer Mayenda	8 May 2005 (age 21)	10	2	(France) Rennes	v. Kosovo, 31 March 2026
FW	Joel Roca	7 June 2005 (age 21)	4	2	(Greece) Olympiacos	v. Kosovo, 31 March 2026
FW	Adrián Niño	19 June 2004 (age 22)	3	2	(Spain) Málaga	v. Kosovo, 31 March 2026
FW	Marc Guiu	4 January 2006 (age 20)	2	1	(England) Chelsea	v. Romania, 18 November 2025

== Honours ==
=== Titles ===
- UEFA European Under-21 Championship
  - (gold) Champions (5): 1986, 1998, 2011, 2013, 2019. (Shared Record)
  - (silver) Runners-up (4): 1984, 1996, 2017, 2023.
  - (bronze) Third place (3): 1994, 2000, 2021

== Former squads ==
- 2025 UEFA European Under-21 Championship squads – Spain
- 2023 UEFA European Under-21 Championship squads – Spain
- 2021 UEFA European Under-21 Championship squads – Spain
- 2019 UEFA European Under-21 Championship squads – Spain
- 2017 UEFA European Under-21 Championship squads – Spain
- 2013 UEFA European Under-21 Championship squads – Spain
- 2011 UEFA European Under-21 Championship squads – Spain
- 2009 UEFA European Under-21 Championship squads – Spain
- 2000 UEFA European Under-21 Championship squads – Spain
- 1998 UEFA European Under-21 Championship squads – Spain
- 1996 UEFA European Under-21 Championship squads – Spain
- 1994 UEFA European Under-21 Championship squads – Spain

== See also ==
- Spain national football team
- Spain national under-23 football team
- Spain national under-20 football team
- Spain national under-19 football team
- Spain national under-18 football team
- Spain national under-17 football team
- Spain national under-16 football team
- Spain national under-15 football team
- Spain national youth football team
