= Marius Söderbäck =

Finnish footballer (born 2004)

Personal information
- Date of birth: 6 February 2004 (age 22)
- Place of birth: Nurmijärvi, Finland
- Height: 1.76 m (5 ft 9 in)
- Position: Midfielder

Team information
- Current team: Kalmar
- Number: 10

Youth career
- NJS
- –2015: HJK
- 2016–2021: Käpylän Pallo

Senior career*
Years	Team	Apps	(Gls)
2021–2023	Käpylän Pallo	41	(13)
2023–2025	Ilves	63	(9)
2026–	Kalmar	24	(1)

International career^{‡}
2021	Finland U18	3	(0)
2022	Finland U19	1	(0)
2025–	Finland U21	7	(4)
Medal record
Ilves
First place	Finnish Cup	2023
- * Club domestic league appearances and goals as of 20 October 2026 ‡ National team caps and goals as of 31 March 2026

Marius Söderbäck (born 6 February 2004) is a Finnish professional footballer who plays as a midfielder for Allsvenskan side Kalmar FF.

== Club career ==
Söderbäck played in the youth sectors of Nurmijärven Jalkapalloseura, HJK Helsinki and Käpylän Pallo. He began his senior career with KäPa first team, playing in third-tier Kakkonen and second-tier Ykkönen.

=== Ilves ===
On 7 August 2023, Veikkausliiga club Ilves announced the signing of Söderbäck from KäPa for an undisclosed fee. On 31 July 2024, Söderbäck scored his first goal for Ilves, in a 2024–25 UEFA Conference League qualifying match against Austria Wien away, helping his side to advance to the third round of the competition by an aggregate win. On 31 August, he signed a two-year contract extension. On 4 October, Söderbäck scored his first goal in Veikkausliiga, in a 2–0 away win against VPS.

=== Kalmar FF ===
In February 2026, Söderbäck joined Allsvenskan club Kalmar FF on a three-year deal.

== International career ==
Söderbäck has represented Finland at under-18 and under-19 youth international levels. He received his first call-up for the Finland U21 national team in September 2024, when he was named in the squad for the 2025 UEFA U21 Euro qualifying matches against Armenia and Romania as a replacement to Juho Talvitie, but remained an unused substitute.

== Career statistics ==
As of 1 April 2026

Appearances and goals by club, season and competition
Club	Season	Division	League		National cup (Note: Includes Finnish Cup and Svenska Cupen)		League cup (Note: Includes Ykköscup and Finnish League Cup)		Europe		Total	
Club	Season	Division	Apps	Goals	Apps	Goals	Apps	Goals	Apps	Goals	Apps	Goals
Käpylän Pallo	2021	Kakkonen	1	0	—		—		—		1	0
Käpylän Pallo	2022	Kakkonen	24	8	1	0	—		—		25	8
Käpylän Pallo	2023	Ykkönen	16	5	3	0	4	1	—		23	6
Käpylän Pallo	Total		41	13	4	0	4	1	0	0	49	14
Ilves II	2023	Kakkonen	2	0	—		—		—		2	0
Ilves	2023	Veikkausliiga	5	0	—		—		—		5	0
Ilves	2024	Veikkausliiga	26	1	1	0	6	0	4 (Note: Appearances in UEFA Conference League)	1	37	2
Ilves	2025	Veikkausliiga	32	8	0	0	5	1	4 (Note: Two appearances in UEFA Europa League, two appearances and one goal in UEFA Conference League)	1	41	10
Ilves	Total		63	9	1	0	11	1	8	2	83	12
Kalmar FF	2026	Allsvenskan	0	0	3	2	–		–		3	2
Career total			106	22	8	2	15	2	8	2	137	26

== Honours ==
Käpylän Pallo

- Kakkonen Group A runner-up: 2022
- Kakkonen Promotion Group A: 2022

Ilves

- Finnish Cup: 2023
- Veikkausliiga runner-up: 2024
