= Raul Cîmpean =

Romanian footballer

Personal information
- Full name: Raul Daniel Cîmpean
- Date of birth: 9 October 2005 (age 21)
- Place of birth: Târnăveni, Romania
- Height: 1.79 m (5 ft 10 in)
- Position: Defensive midfielder

Team information
- Current team: Sepsi OSK
- Number: 27

Youth career
- –2020: ACS Târnăveni
- 2020–2024: Viitorul Mihai Georgescu Cluj
- 2024–2025: Sepsi OSK

Senior career*
| Years | Team | Apps | (Gls) |
| 2024– | Sepsi OSK | 21 | (0) |

International career^{‡}
| 2026 | Romania U21 | 3 | (0) |
- * Club domestic league appearances and goals as of 8 November 2026 ‡ National team caps and goals as of 6 October 2026

Raul Daniel Cîmpean (born 9 October 2005) is a Romanian professional footballer who plays as a defensive midfielder for Liga I club Sepsi OSK.

== Club career ==
Cîmpean made his Liga I debut for Sepsi OSK on 26 July 2026, in a 1-0 home win against Universitatea Cluj.

== Career statistics ==
=== Club ===
As of match played 8 November 2026

Appearances and goals by club, season and competition
| Club | Season | League | | | Cupa României | | Europe | | Other | | Total | |
| Club | Season | Division | Apps | Goals | Apps | Goals | Apps | Goals | Apps | Goals | Apps | Goals |
|---|---|---|---|---|---|---|---|---|---|---|---|---|
| Sepsi OSK | 2024–25 | Liga I | 0 | 0 | 3 | 0 | — | | — | | 3 | 0 |
| Sepsi OSK | 2025–26 | Liga II | 9 | 0 | 4 | 0 | — | | — | | 13 | 0 |
| Sepsi OSK | 2026–27 | Liga I | 12 | 0 | 3 | 0 | — | | — | | 15 | 0 |
| Career total | | | 21 | 0 | 10 | 0 | — | | — | | 31 | 0 |
