= San Marino national under-21 football team =

San Marino U21
- Association: Federazione Sammarinese Giuoco Calcio
- Head coach: Matteo Cecchetti
- Captain: Eugenio Colombini
- Most caps: Samuele Zannoni (12)
- Top scorer: Matteo Valli; Samuele Zannoni (4)
First colours	Second colours

First international
- San Marino 0–5 Switzerland (Serravalle, San Marino; 6 July 1989)

Biggest win
- San Marino 3–0 Gibraltar (Acquaviva, San Marino; 6 June 2024); In competitive matches San Marino 1–0 Wales (Serravalle, San Marino; 6 September 2013)

Biggest defeat
- Spain 14–0 San Marino (Almeria, Spain; 8 February 2005)

UEFA U-21 Championship
- Appearances: None

The San Marino national under-21 football team represents the under-21s of San Marino in the UEFA U-21 Championship, and is controlled by the San Marino Football Federation (FSGC, Italian: Federazione Sammarinese Giuoco Calcio), the governing body of football of the state.

San Marino national under-21 football team competed for the first time in the qualifications for the 1990 UEFA European Under-21 Football Championship. Since then they missed two qualifying tournaments (2000 and 2002). Until 2015 qualifying they won only two matches, both by forfeit. In the 2004 qualifying they lost 6–0 to Sweden but UEFA later awarded the match as a 3–0 forfeit win to San Marino due to Sweden including suspended players in their squad. In the preliminary round of the 2007 qualifying they lost 2–1 to Armenia but UEFA also awarded the match as a 3–0 forfeit win for San Marino. In June 2012, they held Greece to a goalless draw in the 2013 qualifying. On 6 September 2013, San Marino recorded their first competitive win 1–0 over Wales at Stadio Olimpico in the 2015 qualifying. This was also the first competitive victory of any San Marino national team since a 2–1 under-17 victory against Andorra in 2002.

== Competitive record ==
=== UEFA European Under-21 Championship ===
UEFA European Under-21 Championship record									Qualification record					
Year	Round	Position	Pld	W	D	L	GF	GA	Pld	W	D	L	GF	GA
(Europe) 1978	Not a UEFA member								Not a UEFA member					
(Europe) 1980	Not a UEFA member								Not a UEFA member					
(Europe) 1982	Not a UEFA member								Not a UEFA member					
(Europe) 1984	Not a UEFA member								Not a UEFA member					
(Europe) 1986	Not a UEFA member								Not a UEFA member					
(Europe) 1988	Not a UEFA member								Not a UEFA member					
(Europe) 1990	Did not qualify								4	0	0	4	0	12
(Europe) 1992	Did not qualify								6	0	0	6	0	21
(France) 1994	Did not qualify								10	0	0	10	3	40
(Spain) 1996	Did not qualify								8	0	0	8	1	29
(Romania) 1998	Did not qualify								8	0	0	8	2	35
(Slovakia) 2000	Did not enter								Did not enter					
(Switzerland) 2002	Did not enter								Did not enter					
(Germany) 2004	Did not qualify								8	1	0	7	8	29
(Portugal) 2006	Did not qualify								10	0	0	10	4	60
(Netherlands) 2007	Did not qualify								2	1	0	1	3	4
(Sweden) 2009	Did not qualify								8	0	0	8	1	31
(Denmark) 2011	Did not qualify								8	0	0	8	0	51
(Israel) 2013	Did not qualify								10	0	1	9	2	34
(Czech Republic) 2015	Did not qualify								10	1	1	8	2	30
(Poland) 2017	Did not qualify								10	0	1	9	1	30
(Italy) (San Marino) 2019	Did not qualify								10	0	0	10	1	29
(Hungary) (Slovakia) 2021	Did not qualify								10	0	0	10	0	50
(Romania) (Georgia (country)) 2023	Did not qualify								10	0	1	9	0	34
(Slovakia) 2025	Did not qualify								10	0	0	10	1	51
(Albania) (Serbia) 2027	Did not qualify								10	0	0	10	0	57
Total		0/18							152	3	4	145	29	627

== UEFA European Under-21 Football Championship ==
=== 2027 UEFA European Under-21 Championship qualification ===
Pos	Team	Pld	W	D	L	GF	GA	GD	Pts	Qualification	Spain	Finland	Romania	Kosovo	Cyprus	San Marino
1	Spain	10	9	0	1	47	5	+42	27	Final tournament	—	2–1	7–1	2–0	3–0	7–0
2	Finland	10	7	2	1	34	7	+27	23	Play-offs	2–1	—	2–0	0–0	3–0	7–0
3	Romania	10	5	1	4	12	13	−1	16		0–2	0–2	—	0–0	2–0	3–0
4	Kosovo	10	4	3	3	21	11	+10	15		1–3	4–4	0–1	—	2–1	7–0
5	Cyprus	10	2	0	8	8	29	−21	6		0–7	0–5	0–3	0–4	—	2–0
6	San Marino	10	0	0	10	0	57	−57	0		0–13	0–8	0–2	0–3	0–5	—

Source: UEFA

== Current squad ==
- The following players were called up for the 2025 UEFA European Under-21 Championship qualification match.
- Match dates: 15 October 2024.
- Opposition: Latvia
- Caps and goals correct as of: 15 October 2024, after the match against Latvia.

No.	Pos.	Player	Date of birth (age)	Caps	Goals	Club
	GK	Michele Magnani	12 September 2003 (age 23)	0	0	(San Marino Football Federation) San Marino Academy
	GK	Matteo Battistini	12 July 2004 (age 22)	1	0	(San Marino Football Federation) Juvenes/Dogana
	GK	Fabio Borasco	18 September 2005 (age 21)	2	0	(San Marino Football Federation) San Marino Academy
	DF	Alberto Tommasini	19 February 2002 (age 24)	14	0	(San Marino Football Federation) Tre Fiori
	DF	Alessandro Giambalvo	23 April 2003 (age 23)	0	0	(San Marino Football Federation) San Marino Academy
	DF	Simone Giocondi	28 April 2002 (age 24)	9	0	(Italian Football Federation) Tivoli
	DF	Giacomo Matteoni	11 April 2002 (age 24)	10	0	(Italian Football Federation) US Pietracurta
	DF	Mattia Ciacci	30 December 2005 (age 20)	1	1	(San Marino Football Federation) San Marino Academy
	DF	Mattia Sancisi	13 April 2003 (age 23)	11	0	(San Marino Football Federation) San Marino Academy
	DF	Filippo Fabbri	7 January 2002 (age 24)	4	0	(Italian Football Federation) Victor San Marino
	DF	Federico Ciacci	3 April 2005 (age 21)	2	0	(San Marino Football Federation) San Marino Academy
	DF	Simone Gasperoni	31 October 2005 (age 21)	4	0	(San Marino Football Federation) San Marino Academy
	MF	Alberto Guerra	13 January 2004 (age 22)	3	0	(San Marino Football Federation) Tre Fiori
	MF	Nicola D'Addario	21 December 2003 (age 22)	9	0	(San Marino Football Federation) San Marino Academy
	MF	Matteo Valli Casadei	1 June 2005 (age 21)	0	0	(Italian Football Federation) USD Vanchiglia 1915
	MF	Filippo Pasolini	22 February 2003 (age 23)	12	0	(San Marino Football Federation) Juvenes/Dogana
	MF	Niccoló Sancisi	13 April 2004 (age 22)	10	0	(San Marino Football Federation) San Marino Academy
	MF	Niccoló Chiaruzzi	28 October 2005 (age 21)	7	0	(San Marino Football Federation) FC Fiorentino
	MF	Marco Casadei	24 July 2006 (age 20)	5	0	(San Marino Football Federation) San Marino Academy
	FW	Tommaso Famiglietti	5 August 2005 (age 21)	4	0	(San Marino Football Federation) Pennarossa
	FW	Simone Santi	3 May 2004 (age 22)	10	0	(San Marino Football Federation) San Marino Academy
	FW	Marco Gasperoni	16 May 2004 (age 22)	6	0	(San Marino Football Federation) San Marino Academy

== See also ==
- San Marino national football team
