= 2011 UEFA European Under-21 Championship squads =

Football team member listings

This article lists the squads for the 2011 UEFA European Under-21 Championship. Only players born on or after 1 January 1988 were eligible to play.

Each participating national association had to submit a list of up to forty players to the UEFA administration on or before 12 May 2011. No further changes could be made to this list after this deadline. At least four of these forty players had to be goalkeepers.

Only 23 of the forty players listed were authorised to take part in the final tournament. A list of these 23 players had to be in the possession of the UEFA administration on or before 1 June 2011. Three of these 23 players had to be goalkeepers.

Players in boldface have been capped at full international level at some point in their career.

Age, caps, goals and club as of 11 June 2011.

== Group A ==
=== Belarus ===
Head coach: Georgi Kondratiev

| No. | Pos. | Player | Date of birth (age) | Caps | Goals | Club |
|---|---|---|---|---|---|---|
| 1 | GK | **Alyaksandr Hutar** | 18 April 1989 (aged 22) | 17 | 0 | (Belarus) BATE Borisov |
| 2 | MF | **Stanislaw Drahun** | 4 June 1988 (aged 23) | 20 | 5 | (Belarus) Dinamo Minsk |
| 3 | DF | **Syarhey Matsveychyk** | 5 June 1988 (aged 23) | 17 | 0 | (Belarus) Gomel |
| 4 | DF | **Syarhey Palitsevich** | 9 April 1990 (aged 21) | 19 | 0 | (Belarus) Dinamo Minsk |
| 5 | MF | **Dzmitry Baha** | 4 January 1990 (aged 21) | 15 | 0 | (Belarus) BATE Borisov |
| 6 | DF | Yury Astravukh | 21 January 1988 (aged 23) | 12 | 0 | (Belarus) Vedrich-97 Rechitsa |
| 7 | MF | **Mikhail Sivakov** | 16 January 1988 (aged 23) | 19 | 3 | (Poland) Wisła Kraków |
| 8 | MF | Mikita Bukatkin | 7 March 1988 (aged 23) | 16 | 0 | (Belarus) Naftan Novopolotsk |
| 9 | FW | **Maksim Skavysh** | 13 November 1989 (aged 21) | 23 | 4 | (Belarus) BATE Borisov |
| 10 | FW | Aleksandr Perepechko | 7 April 1989 (aged 22) | 0 | 0 | (Belarus) Dinamo Minsk |
| 11 | FW | **Andrey Varankow** | 8 February 1989 (aged 22) | 15 | 4 | (Ukraine) Kryvbas Kryvyi Rih |
| 12 | GK | Artem Gomelko | 8 December 1989 (aged 21) | 11 | 0 | (Russia) Lokomotiv Moscow |
| 13 | MF | **Pavel Nyakhaychyk** | 15 July 1988 (aged 22) | 18 | 4 | (Belarus) BATE Borisov |
| 14 | DF | Yury Ryzhko | 10 October 1989 (aged 21) | 7 | 0 | (Belarus) Torpedo-BelAZ Zhodino |
| 15 | MF | Dzmitry Rekish | 14 September 1988 (aged 22) | 23 | 8 | (Poland) Polonia Warszawa |
| 16 | MF | **Mikhail Gordeichuk** | 23 October 1989 (aged 21) | 14 | 0 | (Belarus) BATE Borisov |
| 17 | DF | Vital Hayduchyk | 12 July 1989 (aged 21) | 5 | 0 | (Belarus) Dinamo Brest |
| 18 | DF | **Dzyanis Palyakow** | 17 April 1991 (aged 20) | 3 | 0 | (Belarus) Shakhtyor Soligorsk |
| 19 | MF | Yawhen Savastsyanaw | 30 January 1988 (aged 23) | 8 | 0 | (Belarus) Neman Grodno |
| 20 | DF | **Aleh Veratsila** | 10 July 1988 (aged 22) | 24 | 1 | (Belarus) Dinamo Minsk |
| 21 | DF | **Egor Filipenko** | 10 April 1988 (aged 23) | 16 | 2 | (Belarus) BATE Borisov |
| 22 | GK | Dzmitry Hushchanka | 3 December 1988 (aged 22) | 2 | 0 | (Belarus) Vitebsk |
| 23 | FW | **Uladzimir Khvashchynski** | 10 May 1990 (aged 21) | 3 | 0 | (Belarus) Dinamo Brest |

=== Denmark ===
Head coach: Keld Bordinggaard

| No. | Pos. | Player | Date of birth (age) | Caps | Goals | Club |
|---|---|---|---|---|---|---|
| 1 | GK | **Jonas Lössl** | 1 February 1989 (aged 22) | 7 | 0 | (Denmark) Midtjylland |
| 2 | DF | **Anders Randrup** | 16 July 1988 (aged 22) | 17 | 0 | (Denmark) Brøndby |
| 3 | DF | **Mathias Jørgensen** | 23 April 1990 (aged 21) | 8 | 0 | (Denmark) Copenhagen |
| 4 | DF | **Andreas Bjelland** | 11 July 1988 (aged 22) | 9 | 0 | (Denmark) Nordsjælland |
| 5 | DF | **Nicolai Boilesen** | 16 February 1992 (aged 19) | 0 | 0 | (Netherlands) Ajax |
| 6 | MF | Mads Albæk | 14 January 1990 (aged 21) | 7 | 0 | (Denmark) Midtjylland |
| 7 | DF | **Daniel Wass** | 31 May 1989 (aged 22) | 10 | 0 | (Denmark) Brøndby |
| 8 | MF | **Mike Jensen** | 19 February 1988 (aged 23) | 23 | 3 | (Denmark) Brøndby |
| 9 | FW | **Nicolai Jørgensen** | 15 January 1991 (aged 20) | 1 | 0 | (Germany) Bayer Leverkusen |
| 10 | FW | **Christian Eriksen** | 14 February 1992 (aged 19) | 0 | 0 | (Netherlands) Ajax |
| 11 | FW | Nicolaj Agger | 23 October 1988 (aged 22) | 8 | 2 | (Denmark) Brøndby |
| 12 | DF | Mads Fenger Nielsen | 10 September 1990 (aged 20) | 1 | 0 | (Denmark) Randers |
| 13 | DF | **Lasse Nielsen** | 8 January 1988 (aged 23) | 11 | 1 | (Denmark) AaB |
| 14 | FW | **Nicki Bille Nielsen** | 7 February 1988 (aged 23) | 21 | 15 | (Spain) Villarreal |
| 15 | DF | **Jesper Juelsgård** | 26 January 1989 (aged 22) | 5 | 0 | (Denmark) Midtjylland |
| 16 | GK | Mikkel Andersen | 17 December 1988 (aged 22) | 4 | 0 | (England) Reading |
| 17 | MF | **Thomas Delaney** | 9 March 1991 (aged 20) | 1 | 0 | (Denmark) Copenhagen |
| 18 | MF | Kasper Povlsen | 26 September 1989 (aged 21) | 8 | 0 | (Denmark) AGF |
| 19 | DF | **Frederik Sørensen** | 14 April 1992 (aged 19) | 0 | 0 | (Italy) Juventus |
| 20 | MF | Matti Lund Nielsen | 8 May 1988 (aged 23) | 11 | 1 | (Denmark) Nordsjælland |
| 21 | FW | **Henrik Dalsgaard** | 27 July 1989 (aged 21) | 4 | 0 | (Denmark) AaB |
| 22 | FW | **Bashkim Kadrii** | 9 July 1991 (aged 19) | 0 | 0 | (Denmark) OB |
| 23 | GK | Nicklas Højlund | 6 March 1990 (aged 21) | 2 | 0 | (Denmark) Lyngby |

=== Iceland ===
Head coach: Eyjólfur Sverrisson

| No. | Pos. | Player | Date of birth (age) | Caps | Goals | Club |
|---|---|---|---|---|---|---|
| 1 | GK | **Haraldur Björnsson** | 11 January 1989 (aged 22) | 16 | 0 | (Iceland) Valur |
| 2 | DF | **Skúli Jón Friðgeirsson** | 30 July 1988 (aged 22) | 10 | 1 | (Iceland) KR |
| 3 | DF | **Hólmar Örn Eyjólfsson** | 6 August 1990 (aged 20) | 18 | 2 | (England) West Ham United |
| 4 | MF | **Eggert Gunnþór Jónsson** | 18 August 1988 (aged 22) | 12 | 0 | (Scotland) Heart of Midlothian |
| 5 | DF | **Hjörtur Logi Valgarðsson** | 27 September 1988 (aged 22) | 11 | 0 | (Sweden) IFK Göteborg |
| 6 | MF | **Birkir Bjarnason** | 27 May 1988 (aged 23) | 22 | 2 | (Norway) Viking |
| 7 | FW | **Jóhann Berg Guðmundsson** | 27 October 1990 (aged 20) | 11 | 6 | (Netherlands) AZ |
| 8 | MF | **Bjarni Þór Viðarsson** | 5 March 1988 (aged 23) | 24 | 6 | (Belgium) KV Mechelen |
| 9 | FW | **Rúrik Gíslason** | 25 February 1988 (aged 23) | 16 | 6 | (Denmark) OB |
| 10 | MF | **Gylfi Sigurðsson** | 8 September 1989 (aged 21) | 11 | 6 | (Germany) 1899 Hoffenheim |
| 11 | FW | **Arnór Smárason** | 7 September 1988 (aged 22) | 8 | 2 | (Denmark) Esbjerg |
| 12 | GK | Óskar Pétursson | 26 January 1989 (aged 22) | 1 | 0 | (Iceland) Grindavík |
| 13 | DF | **Elfar Freyr Helgason** | 27 July 1989 (aged 21) | 6 | 0 | (Greece) AEK Athens |
| 14 | DF | **Þórarinn Ingi Valdimarsson** | 23 April 1990 (aged 21) | 3 | 0 | (Iceland) ÍBV |
| 15 | MF | Almarr Ormarsson | 25 February 1988 (aged 23) | 9 | 2 | (Iceland) Fram |
| 16 | MF | **Guðmundur Kristjánsson** | 1 March 1989 (aged 22) | 10 | 0 | (Iceland) Breiðablik |
| 17 | MF | **Aron Gunnarsson** | 22 April 1989 (aged 22) | 9 | 1 | (England) Coventry City |
| 18 | MF | **Andrés Már Jóhannesson** | 21 December 1988 (aged 22) | 11 | 0 | (Iceland) Fylkir |
| 19 | FW | **Kolbeinn Sigþórsson** | 14 March 1990 (aged 21) | 13 | 3 | (Netherlands) AZ |
| 20 | GK | Arnar Darri Pétursson | 16 March 1991 (aged 20) | 3 | 0 | (Denmark) SønderjyskE |
| 21 | FW | **Alfreð Finnbogason** | 1 February 1989 (aged 22) | 9 | 5 | (Belgium) Lokeren |
| 22 | FW | **Björn Bergmann Sigurðarson** | 26 February 1991 (aged 20) | 3 | 1 | (Norway) Lillestrøm |
| 23 | DF | **Jón Guðni Fjóluson** | 4 October 1989 (aged 21) | 8 | 0 | (Belgium) Beerschot |

=== Switzerland ===
Head coach: Pierluigi Tami

| No. | Pos. | Player | Date of birth (age) | Caps | Goals | Club |
|---|---|---|---|---|---|---|
| 1 | GK | **Yann Sommer** | 17 December 1988 (aged 22) | 26 | 0 | (Switzerland) Basel |
| 2 | DF | Philippe Koch | 8 February 1991 (aged 20) | 13 | 1 | (Switzerland) Zürich |
| 3 | DF | Fabio Daprelà | 19 February 1991 (aged 20) | 7 | 0 | (Italy) Brescia |
| 4 | MF | **Pajtim Kasami** | 2 June 1992 (aged 19) | 8 | 1 | (Italy) Palermo |
| 5 | DF | **Jonathan Rossini** | 5 April 1989 (aged 22) | 18 | 1 | (Italy) Sassuolo |
| 6 | MF | **Fabian Lustenberger** | 2 May 1988 (aged 23) | 20 | 2 | (Germany) Hertha BSC |
| 7 | FW | **Innocent Emeghara** | 27 May 1989 (aged 22) | 3 | 4 | (Switzerland) Grasshopper |
| 8 | MF | **Moreno Costanzo** | 20 February 1988 (aged 23) | 9 | 1 | (Switzerland) Young Boys |
| 9 | MF | **Fabian Frei** | 8 January 1989 (aged 22) | 17 | 4 | (Switzerland) Basel |
| 10 | MF | **Xherdan Shaqiri** | 10 October 1991 (aged 19) | 2 | 0 | (Switzerland) Basel |
| 11 | FW | **Admir Mehmedi** | 16 March 1991 (aged 20) | 5 | 1 | (Switzerland) Zürich |
| 12 | GK | Kevin Fickentscher | 6 July 1988 (aged 22) | 5 | 0 | (Switzerland) Sion |
| 13 | FW | **Nassim Ben Khalifa** | 13 January 1992 (aged 19) | 7 | 1 | (Germany) 1. FC Nürnberg |
| 14 | MF | **Granit Xhaka** | 27 September 1992 (aged 18) | 1 | 0 | (Switzerland) Basel |
| 15 | DF | **Timm Klose** | 9 May 1988 (aged 23) | 7 | 0 | (Switzerland) Thun |
| 16 | DF | **François Affolter** | 13 March 1991 (aged 20) | 7 | 1 | (Switzerland) Young Boys |
| 17 | DF | **Frank Feltscher** | 17 May 1988 (aged 23) | 6 | 1 | (Switzerland) Bellinzona |
| 18 | MF | **Amir Abrashi** | 27 March 1990 (aged 21) | 7 | 0 | (Switzerland) Grasshopper |
| 19 | FW | **Mario Gavranović** | 24 November 1989 (aged 21) | 9 | 3 | (Germany) Schalke 04 |
| 20 | DF | **Daniel Pavlović** | 22 April 1988 (aged 23) | 14 | 0 | (Switzerland) Grasshopper |
| 21 | GK | Benjamin Siegrist | 31 January 1992 (aged 19) | 0 | 0 | (England) Aston Villa |
| 22 | MF | Xavier Hochstrasser | 1 July 1988 (aged 22) | 16 | 2 | (Italy) Padova |
| 23 | DF | **Gaetano Berardi** | 21 August 1988 (aged 22) | 15 | 0 | (Italy) Brescia |

== Group B ==
=== Czech Republic ===
Head coach: Jakub Dovalil

| No. | Pos. | Player | Date of birth (age) | Caps | Goals | Club |
|---|---|---|---|---|---|---|
| 1 | GK | **Tomáš Vaclík** | 29 March 1989 (aged 22) | 11 | 0 | (Czech Republic) Viktoria Žižkov |
| 2 | DF | Jan Lecjaks | 9 August 1990 (aged 20) | 12 | 0 | (Belgium) Anderlecht |
| 3 | DF | **Radim Řezník** | 20 January 1989 (aged 22) | 11 | 0 | (Czech Republic) Baník Ostrava |
| 4 | DF | **Ondřej Mazuch** | 15 March 1989 (aged 22) | 19 | 1 | (Belgium) Anderlecht |
| 5 | DF | **Ondřej Čelůstka** | 18 June 1989 (aged 21) | 13 | 1 | (Czech Republic) Slavia Prague |
| 6 | DF | **Lukáš Vácha** | 13 May 1989 (aged 22) | 14 | 1 | (Czech Republic) Slovan Liberec |
| 7 | MF | **Tomáš Hořava** | 29 May 1988 (aged 23) | 13 | 1 | (Czech Republic) Sigma Olomouc |
| 8 | MF | **Bořek Dočkal** | 30 September 1988 (aged 22) | 22 | 6 | (Czech Republic) Slovan Liberec |
| 9 | FW | **Libor Kozák** | 30 May 1989 (aged 22) | 10 | 3 | (Italy) Lazio |
| 10 | MF | **Jan Morávek** | 1 November 1989 (aged 21) | 5 | 0 | (Germany) 1. FC Kaiserslautern |
| 11 | FW | **Tomáš Pekhart** | 26 May 1989 (aged 22) | 22 | 16 | (Germany) 1. FC Nürnberg |
| 12 | MF | Jan Kovařík | 19 June 1988 (aged 22) | 9 | 2 | (Czech Republic) Jablonec |
| 13 | MF | **Marcel Gecov** | 1 January 1988 (aged 23) | 11 | 1 | (Czech Republic) Slovan Liberec |
| 14 | FW | **Václav Kadlec** | 20 May 1992 (aged 19) | 1 | 1 | (Czech Republic) Sparta Prague |
| 15 | MF | **Milan Černý** | 16 March 1988 (aged 23) | 6 | 0 | (Czech Republic) Slavia Prague |
| 16 | GK | **Marek Štěch** | 28 January 1990 (aged 21) | 6 | 0 | (England) West Ham United |
| 17 | DF | **Marek Suchý** | 29 March 1988 (aged 23) | 17 | 0 | (Russia) Spartak Moscow |
| 18 | MF | **Lukáš Mareček** | 17 April 1990 (aged 21) | 13 | 1 | (Belgium) Anderlecht |
| 19 | FW | Jan Chramosta | 12 October 1990 (aged 20) | 3 | 2 | (Czech Republic) Mladá Boleslav |
| 20 | FW | **Michael Rabušic** | 17 September 1989 (aged 21) | 8 | 4 | (Czech Republic) Brno |
| 21 | DF | Jan Hošek | 1 April 1989 (aged 22) | 9 | 0 | (Czech Republic) Teplice |
| 22 | MF | **Adam Hloušek** | 20 December 1988 (aged 22) | 4 | 0 | (Germany) 1. FC Kaiserslautern |
| 23 | GK | Jan Hanuš | 28 April 1988 (aged 23) | 6 | 0 | (Czech Republic) Slavia Prague |

=== England ===
Head coach: Stuart Pearce

| No. | Pos. | Player | Date of birth (age) | Caps | Goals | Club |
|---|---|---|---|---|---|---|
| 1 | GK | Frank Fielding | 4 April 1988 (aged 23) | 9 | 0 | (England) Derby County |
| 2 | DF | Michael Mancienne | 8 January 1988 (aged 23) | 28 | 1 | (Germany) Hamburger SV |
| 3 | DF | **Ryan Bertrand** | 5 August 1989 (aged 21) | 13 | 0 | (England) Chelsea |
| 4 | MF | Fabrice Muamba | 6 April 1988 (aged 23) | 31 | 0 | (England) Bolton Wanderers |
| 5 | DF | **Chris Smalling** | 22 November 1989 (aged 21) | 11 | 1 | (England) Manchester United |
| 6 | DF | **Phil Jones** | 21 February 1992 (aged 19) | 6 | 0 | (England) Blackburn Rovers |
| 7 | MF | Marc Albrighton | 18 November 1989 (aged 21) | 7 | 1 | (England) Aston Villa |
| 8 | MF | **Jordan Henderson** | 17 June 1990 (aged 20) | 8 | 2 | (England) Liverpool |
| 9 | FW | **Danny Welbeck** | 26 November 1990 (aged 20) | 11 | 3 | (England) Manchester United |
| 10 | FW | **Daniel Sturridge** | 1 September 1989 (aged 21) | 12 | 4 | (England) Chelsea |
| 11 | MF | Scott Sinclair | 25 March 1989 (aged 22) | 4 | 1 | (Wales) Swansea City |
| 12 | DF | **Kieran Gibbs (Note: Withdrawn prior to tournament but not replaced.)** | 26 September 1989 (aged 21) | 15 | 3 | (England) Arsenal |
| 13 | GK | **Alex McCarthy** | 3 December 1989 (aged 21) | 3 | 0 | (England) Reading |
| 14 | DF | **Kyle Walker** | 28 May 1990 (aged 21) | 4 | 0 | (England) Tottenham Hotspur |
| 15 | DF | James Tomkins | 23 September 1989 (aged 21) | 10 | 0 | (England) West Ham United |
| 16 | MF | **Jack Cork** | 25 June 1989 (aged 21) | 13 | 0 | (England) Chelsea |
| 17 | MF | **Tom Cleverley** | 12 August 1989 (aged 21) | 14 | 0 | (England) Manchester United |
| 18 | MF | Henri Lansbury | 12 October 1990 (aged 20) | 6 | 0 | (England) Arsenal |
| 19 | MF | **Jack Rodwell** | 11 March 1991 (aged 20) | 15 | 2 | (England) Everton |
| 20 | MF | **Danny Rose** | 2 July 1990 (aged 20) | 17 | 3 | (England) Tottenham Hotspur |
| 21 | FW | Nathan Delfouneso | 2 February 1991 (aged 20) | 8 | 2 | (England) Aston Villa |
| 22 | FW | Connor Wickham | 31 March 1993 (aged 18) | 3 | 0 | (England) Ipswich Town |
| 23 | GK | Jason Steele | 18 August 1990 (aged 20) | 1 | 0 | (England) Middlesbrough |

=== Spain ===
Head coach: Luis Milla

| No. | Pos. | Player | Date of birth (age) | Caps | Goals | Club |
|---|---|---|---|---|---|---|
| 1 | GK | Rubén Miño | 18 January 1989 (aged 22) | 2 | 0 | (Spain) Barcelona |
| 2 | DF | **César Azpilicueta** | 28 August 1989 (aged 21) | 18 | 1 | (France) Marseille |
| 3 | DF | **Álvaro Domínguez** | 15 May 1989 (aged 22) | 8 | 1 | (Spain) Atlético Madrid |
| 4 | MF | **Javi Martínez** (captain) | 2 September 1988 (aged 22) | 19 | 1 | (Spain) Athletic Bilbao |
| 5 | DF | **Mikel San José** | 30 May 1989 (aged 22) | 8 | 1 | (Spain) Athletic Bilbao |
| 6 | FW | **Jeffrén** | 20 January 1988 (aged 23) | 9 | 1 | (Spain) Barcelona |
| 7 | FW | **Adrián** | 8 January 1988 (aged 23) | 14 | 4 | (Spain) Deportivo La Coruña |
| 8 | MF | **Dani Parejo** | 16 April 1989 (aged 22) | 15 | 5 | (Spain) Valencia |
| 9 | FW | **Bojan** | 28 August 1990 (aged 20) | 18 | 4 | (Spain) Barcelona |
| 10 | MF | **Juan Mata** | 28 April 1988 (aged 23) | 15 | 3 | (Spain) Valencia |
| 11 | MF | **Diego Capel** | 16 February 1988 (aged 23) | 21 | 5 | (Spain) Sevilla |
| 12 | DF | Martín Montoya | 14 April 1991 (aged 20) | 3 | 0 | (Spain) Barcelona |
| 13 | GK | **David de Gea** | 7 November 1990 (aged 20) | 8 | 0 | (Spain) Atlético Madrid |
| 14 | FW | **Emilio Nsue** | 30 September 1989 (aged 21) | 7 | 1 | (Spain) Mallorca |
| 15 | DF | José Ángel | 5 September 1989 (aged 21) | 4 | 0 | (Spain) Sporting Gijón |
| 16 | DF | Víctor Ruiz | 25 January 1989 (aged 22) | 4 | 0 | (Italy) Napoli |
| 17 | DF | Dídac Vilà | 9 June 1989 (aged 22) | 3 | 0 | (Italy) Milan |
| 18 | MF | **Ander Herrera** | 14 August 1989 (aged 21) | 10 | 2 | (Spain) Zaragoza |
| 19 | MF | **Thiago** | 11 April 1991 (aged 20) | 7 | 0 | (Spain) Barcelona |
| 20 | DF | Alberto Botía | 27 January 1989 (aged 22) | 12 | 0 | (Spain) Sporting Gijón |
| 21 | MF | Rubén Pérez | 26 April 1989 (aged 22) | 5 | 0 | (Spain) Deportivo La Coruña |
| 22 | FW | **Iker Muniain** | 19 December 1992 (aged 18) | 2 | 0 | (Spain) Athletic Bilbao |
| 23 | GK | Diego Mariño | 9 May 1990 (aged 21) | 3 | 0 | (Spain) Villarreal |

=== Ukraine ===
Head coach: Pavlo Yakovenko

| No. | Pos. | Player | Date of birth (age) | Caps | Goals | Club |
|---|---|---|---|---|---|---|
| 1 | GK | Anton Kanibolotskiy | 16 May 1988 (aged 23) | 19 | 0 | (Ukraine) Dnipro Dnipropetrovsk |
| 2 | DF | **Bohdan Butko** | 13 January 1991 (aged 20) | 9 | 1 | (Ukraine) Volyn |
| 3 | DF | **Yevhen Selin** | 9 May 1988 (aged 23) | 23 | 0 | (Ukraine) Vorskla |
| 4 | DF | **Yaroslav Rakitskiy** | 3 August 1989 (aged 21) | 14 | 3 | (Ukraine) Shakhtar Donetsk |
| 5 | MF | **Artem Putivtsev** | 29 August 1988 (aged 22) | 5 | 1 | (Ukraine) Illichivets |
| 6 | MF | Vitaliy Vitsenets | 3 August 1990 (aged 20) | 7 | 0 | (Ukraine) Shakhtar Donetsk |
| 7 | MF | **Yevhen Konoplyanka** | 29 September 1989 (aged 21) | 14 | 5 | (Ukraine) Dnipro Dnipropetrovsk |
| 8 | MF | **Taras Stepanenko** (captain) | 8 August 1989 (aged 21) | 27 | 1 | (Ukraine) Shakhtar Donetsk |
| 9 | MF | **Mykola Morozyuk** | 17 January 1988 (aged 23) | 26 | 3 | (Ukraine) Metalurh Donetsk |
| 10 | FW | **Roman Zozulya** | 17 November 1989 (aged 21) | 20 | 2 | (Ukraine) Dynamo Kyiv |
| 11 | FW | **Andriy Yarmolenko** | 23 October 1989 (aged 21) | 13 | 3 | (Ukraine) Dynamo Kyiv |
| 12 | GK | **Denys Boyko** | 29 January 1988 (aged 23) | 8 | 0 | (Ukraine) Dynamo Kyiv |
| 13 | DF | Temur Partsvania | 6 July 1991 (aged 19) | 1 | 0 | (Ukraine) Dynamo Kyiv |
| 14 | MF | Oleh Holodyuk | 2 January 1988 (aged 23) | 14 | 2 | (Ukraine) Karpaty |
| 15 | DF | **Serhiy Kryvtsov** | 15 March 1991 (aged 20) | 14 | 2 | (Ukraine) Shakhtar Donetsk |
| 16 | MF | Maksym Bilyi | 27 April 1989 (aged 22) | 8 | 2 | (Ukraine) Zorya |
| 17 | MF | Volodymyr Chesnakov | 12 February 1988 (aged 23) | 22 | 2 | (Ukraine) Vorskla |
| 18 | DF | Oleksiy Kurylov | 9 May 1988 (aged 23) | 16 | 0 | (Ukraine) Vorskla |
| 19 | MF | **Denys Harmash** | 19 April 1990 (aged 21) | 13 | 1 | (Ukraine) Dynamo Kyiv |
| 20 | DF | Oleksandr Matvyeyev | 11 February 1989 (aged 22) | 11 | 0 | (Ukraine) Vorskla |
| 21 | MF | Valeriy Fedorchuk | 5 October 1988 (aged 22) | 18 | 2 | (Ukraine) Kryvbas |
| 22 | FW | **Artem Kravets** | 3 June 1989 (aged 22) | 7 | 0 | (Ukraine) Dynamo Kyiv |
| 23 | GK | **Dmytro Nepohodov** | 17 February 1988 (aged 23) | 2 | 0 | (Ukraine) Metalurh Donetsk |

== Player statistics ==
Player representation by club

| Players | Clubs |
|---|---|
| 6 | (Belarus) BATE Borisov, (Ukraine) Dynamo Kyiv |
| 5 | (Spain) Barcelona |
| 4 | (Ukraine) Shakhtar Donetsk, (Ukraine) Vorskla, (Switzerland) Basel, (Denmark) Brøndby |
| 3 | (England) Aston Villa, (England) Chelsea, (England) Manchester United, (England) West Ham United, (Switzerland) Zürich, (Switzerland) Grasshopper, (Spain) Athletic Bilbao, (Denmark) Midtjylland, (Belgium) Anderlecht, (Czech Republic) Slavia Prague, (Czech Republic) Slovan Liberec |
| 2 | (Ukraine) Dnipro Dnipropetrovsk, (Ukraine) Metalurh Donetsk, (Ukraine) Kryvbas, (England) Arsenal, (England) Tottenham Hotspur, (England) Reading, (Switzerland) Young Boys, (Italy) Brescia, (Germany) 1. FC Nürnberg, (Germany) 1. FC Kaiserslautern, (Spain) Atlético Madrid, (Spain) Sporting Gijón, (Spain) Deportivo La Coruña, (Spain) Villarreal, (Greece) AEK Athens, (Denmark) SønderjyskE, (Denmark) AaB, (Denmark) OB, (Denmark) Copenhagen, (Denmark) Nordsjælland, (Netherlands) AZ, (Netherlands) Ajax, (Belarus) Dinamo Minsk, (Belarus) Dinamo Brest, (Belarus) Shakhtyor Soligorsk |

Player representation by league

| Country | Players | Percentage | Outside national squad |
|---|---|---|---|
| Total | 184 | | |
| England | 27 | 14.67% | 5 |
| Ukraine | 24 | 13.04% | 1 |
| Denmark | 21 | 11.41% | 3 |
| Spain | 21 | 11.41% | 1 |
| Belarus | 19 | 10.33% | 0 |
| Czech Republic | 14 | 7.61% | 0 |
| Switzerland | 13 | 7.07% | 0 |
| Germany | 9 | 4.89% | 9 |
| Italy | 8 | 4.35% | 8 |
| Iceland | 7 | 3.80% | 0 |
| Belgium | 6 | 3.26% | 6 |
| Others | 14 | 7.62% | |

The Ukrainian squad were made up entirely of players from the respective countries' domestic leagues. Altogether, there were eighteen national leagues that had players in the tournament.

Average age of squads

| Average age | Countries |
|---|---|
| 20 | Switzerland |
| 21 | Denmark, Spain, England |
| 22 | Belarus, Czech Republic, Iceland, Ukraine |
