= 1994 UEFA European Under-21 Championship squads =

Football team member listings

This article displays the squads for the 1994 UEFA European Under-21 Championship. Only players born on or after 1 January 1971 were eligible to play. Players in bold have later been capped at full international level.

== Czechoslovakia ==
Head coach: Ivan Kopecký

| No. | Pos. | Player | Date of birth (age) | Caps | Club |
|---|---|---|---|---|---|
| 1 | GK | **Jaromír Blažek** | 29 December 1972 (aged 21) | | (Czechoslovakia) Viktoria Žižkov |
| 2 | MF | **Robert Tomaschek** | 25 August 1972 (aged 21) | | (Czechoslovakia) Slovan Bratislava |
| 3 | DF | **Petr Gabriel** | 17 May 1973 (aged 20) | | (Czechoslovakia) Viktoria Žižkov |
| 4 | MF | **Pavel Nedvěd** | 30 August 1972 (aged 21) | | (Czechoslovakia) Sparta Prague |
| 5 | MF | **Zdeněk Svoboda** | 20 May 1972 (aged 21) | | (Czechoslovakia) Sparta Prague |
| 6 | DF | **Tomáš Ujfaluši** | 24 March 1978 (aged 16) | | (Czechoslovakia) Sigma Olomouc |
| 7 | MF | **Jiří Lerch** | 17 October 1971 (aged 22) | | (Czechoslovakia) Slavia Prague |
| 8 | FW | **Vratislav Lokvenc** | 27 September 1973 (aged 20) | | (Czechoslovakia) Sparta Prague |
| 9 | FW | **Jozef Kožlej** | 8 July 1973 (aged 20) | | (Czechoslovakia) Sparta Prague |
| 10 | FW | **Štefan Rusnák** | 7 August 1971 (aged 22) | | (Czechoslovakia) Slavia Prague |
| 11 | MF | **Tomáš Galásek** | 15 January 1973 (aged 21) | | (Czechoslovakia) Baník Ostrava |
| 12 | GK | **Kamil Čontofalský** | 3 June 1978 (aged 15) | | (Czechoslovakia) Trenčín |
| 13 | DF | **Tomáš Řepka** | 2 January 1974 (aged 20) | | (Czechoslovakia) Baník Ostrava |
| 14 | DF | **Tomas Votava** | 21 February 1974 (aged 20) | | (Czechoslovakia) Sparta Prague |
| 15 | FW | **Jan Koller** | 30 March 1973 (aged 21) | | (Czechoslovakia) Sparta Prague |
| 16 | GK | **Daniel Zítka** | 20 June 1975 (aged 18) | | (Czechoslovakia) Viktoria Žižkov |
| 17 | FW | **Vladimír Šmicer** | 24 May 1973 (aged 20) | | (Czechoslovakia) Slavia Prague |
| 18 | MF | **Radek Bejbl** | 29 August 1972 (aged 21) | | (Czechoslovakia) Slavia Prague |
| 19 | DF | Michal Kovář | 8 September 1973 (aged 20) | | (Czechoslovakia) Sigma Olomouc |
| 20 | MF | **Karel Poborský** | 30 March 1972 (aged 22) | | (Czechoslovakia) České Budějovice |

== France ==
Head coach: Raymond Domenech

| No. | Pos. | Player | Date of birth (age) | Caps | Club |
|---|---|---|---|---|---|
| 1 | GK | **Richard Dutruel** | December 24, 1972 (aged 21) | | (France) Caen |
| 2 | DF | Francis Llacer | September 9, 1971 (aged 22) | | (France) Paris Saint-Germain |
| 3 | DF | Serge Blanc | October 22, 1972 (aged 21) | | (France) Montepellier |
| 4 | DF | **Lilian Thuram** | January 1, 1972 (aged 22) | | (France) Monaco |
| 5 | DF | **Frédéric Déhu** | October 24, 1972 (aged 21) | | (France) Lens |
| 6 | DF | Oumar Dieng | December 30, 1972 (aged 21) | | (France) Lille |
| 7 | MF | **Zinedine Zidane** | June 23, 1972 (aged 21) | | (France) Bordeaux |
| 8 | MF | **Reynald Pedros** | October 10, 1971 (aged 22) | | (France) Nantes |
| 9 | FW | **Nicolas Ouédec** | October 28, 1971 (aged 22) | | (France) Nantes |
| 10 | MF | **Johan Micoud** | July 24, 1973 (aged 20) | | (France) Cannes |
| 11 | FW | **Christophe Dugarry** | March 24, 1972 (aged 22) | | (France) Bordeaux |
| 12 | MF | Cyril Serredszum | October 2, 1971 (aged 22) | | (France) Metz |
| 13 | MF | Sylvain Deplace | January 4, 1972 (aged 22) | | (France) Lyon |
| 14 | DF | Jérôme Bonnissel | April 11, 1973 (aged 21) | | (France) Montepellier |
| 15 | FW | Pascal Nouma | January 6, 1972 (aged 22) | | (France) Caen |
| 16 | GK | Stéphane Cassard | November 11, 1972 (aged 21) | | (France) Sochaux |
| 17 | DF | **Alain Goma** | October 5, 1972 (aged 21) | | (France) Auxerre |
| 18 | DF | Bruno Carotti | September 30, 1972 (aged 21) | | (France) Montepellier |
| 19 | MF | **Claude Makélélé** | February 18, 1973 (aged 21) | | (France) Nantes |
| 20 | MF | Fabien Lefèvre | November 14, 1971 (aged 22) | | (France) Montpellier |

== Greece ==
| No. | Pos. | Player | Date of birth (age) | Caps | Club |
|---|---|---|---|---|---|
| 1 | GK | Fanis Katergiannakis | 16 February 1974 (aged 20) | | (Greece) Aris |
| 2 | MF | Grigoris Georgatos | 31 October 1972 (aged 21) | | (Greece) Panachaiki |
| 3 | DF | Giannis Goumas | 24 May 1975 (aged 18) | | (Greece) Panathinaikos |
| 4 | MF | Giorgos Karagounis | 6 March 1977 (aged 17) | | (Greece) Panathinaikos |
| 5 | DF | Michalis Kapsis | 18 October 1973 (aged 20) | | (Greece) Ethnikos |
| 6 | MF | Pantelis Kafes | 24 June 1978 (aged 15) | | (Greece) Pontioi Veria |
| 7 | MF | Georgios Georgiadis | 8 March 1972 (aged 22) | | (Greece) Panathinaikos |
| 8 | FW | Zisis Vryzas | 9 November 1973 (aged 20) | | (Greece) Skoda Xanthi |
| 9 | FW | Sotiris Konstantinidis | 19 April 1977 (aged 16) | | (Greece) Iraklis |
| 10 | MF | Vasilios Tsiartas | 12 November 1972 (aged 21) | | (Greece) AEK Athens |
| 11 | FW | Alexandros Alexoudis | 20 June 1972 (aged 21) | | (Greece) OFI |
| 12 | GK | Antonios Nikopolidis | 14 January 1971 (aged 23) | | (Greece) Panathinaikos |
| 13 | GK | Kostas Chalkias | 30 May 1974 (aged 19) | | (Greece) Panathinaikos |
| 14 | DF | Paraskevas Antzas | 18 August 1977 (aged 16) | | (Greece) Pandramaikos |
| 15 | MF | Stelios Giannakopoulos | 12 July 1974 (aged 19) | | (Greece) Paniliakos |
| 16 | DF | Georgios Anatolakis | 16 March 1974 (aged 20) | | (Greece) Iraklis |
| 17 | MF | Theodoros Zagorakis | 27 October 1971 (aged 22) | | (Greece) PAOK |
| 18 | DF | Athanasios Kostoulas | 24 March 1976 (aged 18) | | (Greece) Kalamata |
| 19 | DF | Traianos Dellas | 31 January 1976 (aged 18) | | (Greece) Aris |
| 20 | FW | Nikos Liberopoulos | 4 August 1975 (aged 18) | | (Greece) Kalamata |

== Italy ==
Players were ordered alphabetically by role.

Head coach: Cesare Maldini

| No. | Pos. | Player | Date of birth (age) | Caps | Club |
|---|---|---|---|---|---|
| 1 | GK | **Francesco Toldo** | 2 December 1971 (aged 22) | | (Italy) Milan |
| 2 | DF | **Fabio Cannavaro** | 13 September 1973 (aged 20) | | (Italy) Napoli |
| 3 | DF | Francesco Colonnese | 10 August 1971 (aged 22) | | (Italy) Cremonese |
| 4 | DF | Daniele Delli Carri | 18 September 1971 (aged 22) | | (Italy) Torino |
| 5 | DF | Fabio Galante | 20 November 1973 (aged 20) | | (Italy) Genoa |
| 6 | DF | **Paolo Negro** | 16 April 1972 (aged 21) | | (Italy) Lazio |
| 7 | DF | **Christian Panucci** | 12 April 1973 (aged 20) | | (Italy) Milan |
| 8 | DF | Emanuele Tresoldi | 20 November 1973 (aged 20) | | (Italy) Ravenna |
| 9 | MF | Daniele Berretta | 8 March 1972 (aged 22) | | (Italy) Roma |
| 10 | MF | Emiliano Bigica | 4 September 1973 (aged 20) | | (Italy) Bari |
| 11 | DF | Gianluca Cherubini | 28 February 1974 (aged 20) | | (Italy) Reggiana |
| 12 | GK | Stefano Visi | 11 December 1971 (aged 22) | | (Italy) Sambenedettese |
| 13 | MF | Dario Marcolin | 28 October 1971 (aged 22) | | (Italy) Cagliari |
| 14 | MF | **Fabio Rossitto** | 21 September 1971 (aged 22) | | (Italy) Udinese |
| 15 | MF | Alessio Scarchilli | 10 September 1972 (aged 21) | | (Italy) Roma |
| 16 | FW | Benito Carbone | 14 August 1971 (aged 22) | | (Italy) Torino |
| 17 | FW | **Filippo Inzaghi** | 9 August 1973 (aged 20) | | (Italy) Verona |
| 18 | FW | Roberto Muzzi | 21 September 1971 (aged 22) | | (Italy) Roma |
| 19 | MF | Pierluigi Orlandini | 9 October 1972 (aged 21) | | (Italy) Atalanta |
| 20 | FW | **Christian Vieri** | 12 July 1973 (aged 20) | | (Italy) Ravenna |

== Poland ==
Head coach: Wiktor Stasiuk

| No. | Pos. | Player | Date of birth (age) | Caps | Club |
|---|---|---|---|---|---|
| 1 | GK | **Radosław Majdan** | 10 May 1972 (aged 21) | | (Poland) Pogoń Szczecin |
| 12 | GK | **Arkadiusz Onyszko** | 12 January 1974 (aged 20) | | (Poland) Polonia Warszawa |
| 18 | GK | **Bogusław Wyparło** | 29 November 1974 (aged 19) | | (Poland) Stal Mielec |
| 2 | DF | **Jacek Bąk** | 24 March 1973 (aged 20) | | (Poland) Lech Poznań |
| 3 | DF | **Daniel Bogusz** | 21 September 1974 (aged 19) | | (Poland) Jagiellonia Białystok |
| 4 | DF | Piotr Grzelak | 21 August 1973 (aged 20) | | (Poland) Zawisza Bydgoszcz |
| 6 | DF | **Tomasz Hajto** | 16 October 1972 (aged 21) | | (Poland) Górnik Zabrze |
| 13 | DF | **Arkadiusz Kaliszan** | 13 November 1972 (aged 21) | | (Netherlands) Roda JC |
| 15 | DF | **Adam Ledwoń** | 15 January 1974 (aged 20) | | (Poland) GKS Katowice |
| 22 | DF | Piotr Mosór | 28 March 1974 (aged 19) | | (Poland) Ruch Chorzów |
| 21 | DF | Piotr Przerywacz | 15 November 1972 (aged 21) | | (Poland) Zagłębie Lubin |
| 23 | DF | **Krzysztof Ratajczyk** | 9 November 1973 (aged 20) | | (Poland) Legia Warsaw |
| * | DF | **Maciej Stolarczyk** | 15 January 1972 (aged 22) | | (Poland) Pogoń Szczecin |
| * | DF | **Paweł Wojtala** | 27 October 1972 (aged 21) | | (Poland) Lech Poznań |
| 5 | MF | Mieczysław Agafon | 18 November 1971 (aged 22) | | (Poland) Górnik Zabrze |
| 8 | MF | **Jacek Berensztajn** | 16 October 1973 (aged 20) | | (Poland) Siarka Tarnobrzeg |
| 10 | MF | Piotr Kasperski | 7 March 1972 (aged 22) | | (Poland) Sokół Pniewy |
| 14 | MF | **Arkadiusz Kubik** | 31 May 1972 (aged 21) | | (Poland) Górnik Zabrze |
| 16 | MF | Michał Probierz | 24 September 1972 (aged 21) | | (Germany) Bayer Uerdingen |
| * | MF | Rafał Ruta | 24 października 1972 (aged 21) | | (Poland) Stal Mielec |
| 20 | MF | **Piotr Świerczewski** | 8 April 1972 (aged 21) | | (France) Saint-Étienne |
| * | MF | **Sławomir Wojciechowski** | 6 September 1973 (aged 20) | | (Poland) Zawisza Bydgoszcz |
| 7 | FW | **Henryk Bałuszyński** | 15 July 1972 (aged 21) | | (Poland) Górnik Zabrze |
| 9 | FW | Krzysztof Bociek | 30 March 1974 (aged 20) | | (Poland) Stal Mielec |
| 11 | FW | **Roman Dąbrowski** | 14 March 1972 (aged 21) | | (Poland) Ruch Chorzów |
| * | FW | Paweł Gościniak | 23 January 1973 (aged 21) | | (Poland) Wisła Kraków |
| | FW | Andrzej Kubica | 7 July 1972 (aged 21) | | (Austria) Rapid Wien |
| 17 | FW | **Cezary Kucharski** | 17 February 1972 (aged 22) | | (Switzerland) Aarau |
| 19 | FW | **Olgierd Moskalewicz** | 16 February 1974 (aged 20) | | (Poland) Pogoń Szczecin |
| | FW | **Tomasz Rząsa** | 11 March 1973 (aged 21) | | (Poland) Sokół Pniewy |

== Portugal ==
Head coach: Nelo Vingada

| No. | Pos. | Player | Date of birth (age) | Caps | Club |
|---|---|---|---|---|---|
| 1 | GK | Fernando Brassard | 11 April 1972 (aged 22) | | (Portugal) Marítimo |
| 2 | DF | **Nélson** | 5 November 1971 (aged 22) | | (Portugal) Sporting CP |
| 3 | DF | **Rui Bento** | 14 January 1972 (aged 22) | | (Portugal) Boavista |
| 4 | DF | **Jorge Costa** | 14 October 1971 (aged 22) | | (Portugal) Porto |
| 5 | DF | **Paulo Torres** | 25 November 1971 (aged 22) | | (Portugal) Sporting CP |
| 6 | DF | **Abel Xavier** | 30 November 1972 (aged 21) | | (Portugal) Benfica |
| 7 | MF | **Luís Figo** | 4 November 1972 (aged 21) | | (Portugal) Sporting CP |
| 8 | MF | João Oliveira Pinto | 3 August 1971 (aged 22) | | (Portugal) Estoril |
| 9 | FW | Toni | 2 August 1972 (aged 21) | | (Portugal) Braga |
| 10 | MF | **Rui Costa** | 29 March 1972 (aged 22) | | (Portugal) Benfica |
| 11 | FW | **Ricardo Sá Pinto** | 10 October 1972 (aged 21) | | (Portugal) Salgueiros |
| 12 | GK | Paulo Costinha | 22 September 1973 (aged 20) | | (Portugal) Sporting CP |
| 13 | DF | Álvaro Gregório | 25 August 1972 (aged 21) | | (Portugal) Paços de Ferreira |
| 14 | MF | **Bino** | 19 December 1972 (aged 21) | | (Portugal) Salgueiros |
| 15 | FW | **João Vieira Pinto** | 19 August 1971 (aged 22) | | (Portugal) Benfica |
| 16 | FW | Gil | 2 December 1972 (aged 21) | | (Portugal) Braga |
| 17 | MF | **Tulipa** | 16 October 1972 (aged 21) | | (Portugal) Salgueiros |
| 18 | MF | **Nuno Capucho** | 21 February 1972 (aged 22) | | (Portugal) Sporting CP |
| 19 | DF | Jorge Soares | 22 October 1971 (aged 22) | | (Portugal) Farense |
| 20 | GK | **Paulo Santos** | 11 December 1972 (aged 21) | | (Portugal) Benfica |

== Russia ==
Head coach: Boris Ignatyev

| No. | Pos. | Player | Date of birth (age) | Caps | Club |
|---|---|---|---|---|---|
| 1 | GK | Yevgeni Plotnikov | 6 September 1972 (aged 21) | | (Russia) CSKA Moscow |
| 2 | DF | **Roman Sharonov** | 8 September 1976 (aged 16) | | (Russia) Lokomotiv-2 Moscow |
| 3 | DF | **Konstantin Zyryanov** | 5 October 1977 (aged 15) | | (Russia) Amkar Perm |
| 4 | MF | **Igor Semshov** | 6 April 1978 (aged 15) | | (Russia) CSKA Moscow |
| 5 | DF | **Ramiz Mamedov** | 21 August 1972 (aged 21) | | (Russia) Spartak Moscow |
| 6 | DF | **Vadim Evseev** | 8 January 1976 (aged 17) | | (Russia) Spartak Moscow |
| 7 | MF | Ansar Ayupov | 23 March 1972 (aged 21) | | (Russia) Presnya Moscow |
| 8 | FW | **Dmitri Kirichenko** | 17 January 1977 (aged 16) | | (Russia) Lokomotiv-KMV Mineralnye Vody |
| 9 | FW | **Ilshat Faizulin** | 5 March 1973 (aged 21) | | (Russia) CSKA Moscow |
| 10 | MF | **Yuri Drozdov** | 16 January 1972 (aged 22) | | (Russia) Lokomotiv Moscow |
| 11 | FW | **Igor Simutenkov** | 3 April 1973 (aged 20) | | (Russia) Dynamo Moscow |
| 12 | GK | Mikhail Kharin | 17 June 1976 (aged 17) | | (Russia) Torpedo Moscow |
| 13 | DF | Aleksandr Grishin | 18 November 1971 (aged 22) | | (Russia) CSKA Moscow |
| 14 | DF | Aleksey Naumov | 2 February 1972 (aged 22) | | (Russia) Zenit Saint Petersburg |
| 15 | FW | **Valery Yesipov** | 4 October 1971 (aged 22) | | (Russia) Rotor Volgograd |
| 16 | DF | **Dmitri Sennikov** | 24 June 1976 (aged 16) | | (Russia) Lokomotiv Saint Petersburg |
| 17 | FW | Andrei Talalayev | 5 October 1972 (aged 21) | | (Russia) Torpedo Moscow |
| 18 | MF | **Sergei Mandreko** | 1 August 1971 (aged 22) | | (Austria) Rapid Wien |
| 19 | MF | **Rolan Gusev** | 17 September 1977 (aged 15) | | (Russia) Dynamo Moscow |
| 20 | GK | Sergey Armishev | 29 April 1976 (aged 17) | | (Russia) Zvezda Perm |

== Spain ==
Head coach: Andoni Goikoetxea

| No. | Pos. | Player | Date of birth (age) | Caps | Club |
|---|---|---|---|---|---|
| 1 | GK | Toni Prats | 9 September 1971 (aged 22) | | (Spain) Mallorca |
| 2 | DF | **Sergi Barjuán** | 28 December 1971 (aged 22) | | (Spain) Barcelona |
| 3 | MF | **Andoni Imaz** | 5 September 1971 (aged 22) | | (Spain) Real Sociedad |
| 4 | MF | Óscar García | 26 April 1973 (aged 21) | | (Spain) Barcelona |
| 5 | DF | Ramón González | 25 November 1974 (aged 19) | | (Spain) Valladolid |
| 6 | MF | **Julen Guerrero** | 7 January 1974 (aged 20) | | (Spain) Athletic Bilbao |
| 7 | DF | Jesús Enrique Velasco | 16 January 1972 (aged 22) | | (Spain) Real Madrid |
| 8 | FW | **Thomas Christiansen** | 11 March 1973 (aged 20) | | (Spain) Osasuna |
| 9 | FW | **Pier Luigi Cherubino** | 15 October 1971 (aged 22) | | (Spain) Tenerife |
| 10 | MF | Jesús García Sanjuán | 22 August 1971 (aged 22) | | (Spain) Zaragoza |
| 11 | FW | Lluís Carreras | 24 September 1972 (aged 21) | | (Spain) Oviedo |
| 12 | DF | **Aitor Karanka** | 18 September 1973 (aged 20) | | (Spain) Athletic Bilbao |
| 13 | GK | Juan José Valencia | 18 September 1971 (aged 22) | | (Spain) Athletic Bilbao |
| 14 | DF | **Mikel Lasa** | 9 September 1971 (aged 22) | | (Spain) Real Madrid |
| 15 | FW | José Gálvez | 3 August 1974 (aged 19) | | (Spain) Valencia |
| 16 | MF | Antonio Acosta | 22 November 1971 (aged 22) | | (Spain) Lleida |
| 17 | MF | **Gaizka Mendieta** | 27 March 1974 (aged 19) | | (Spain) Valencia |
| 18 | DF | **Roberto Ríos** | 8 October 1971 (aged 22) | | (Spain) Betis |
| 19 | DF | José Miguel Prieto (c) | 22 November 1971 (aged 22) | | (Spain) Sevilla |
| 20 | FW | **Kiko** | 26 April 1972 (aged 22) | | (Spain) Atlético Madrid |
