= Finland national under-21 football team =

Finland national football team under 21 years

Finland U21
- Nickname(s): Pikkuhuuhkajat (The Little Eagle-Owls)
- Association: Football Association of Finland
- Confederation: UEFA (Europe)
- Head coach: (Finland) Mika Lehkosuo
- FIFA code: FIN
First colours	Second colours

First international
- Finland 1–3 Sweden (Vaasa, Finland; 11 August 1976)

Biggest win
- Finland 8-0 San Marino (Serravalle, San Marino, San Marino; 26 March 2026)

Biggest defeat
- England 8–1 Finland (Hull, England; 12 October 1977)

UEFA U-21 Championship
- Appearances: 3 (first in 2009)
- Best result: Group stage (2009, 2025)

The Finland national under-21 football team is the national under-21 football team of Finland.

The team qualified for the UEFA Euro U21 Championship final tournament for the first time in 2009, under head coach Markku Kanerva. 15 years later, coached by Mika Lehkosuo, they qualified for the 2025 UEFA Euro U21 Championship tournament in Slovakia, for the second time in the nation's history, after defeating Norway in the qualification play-offs.

== UEFA European Championship Record ==
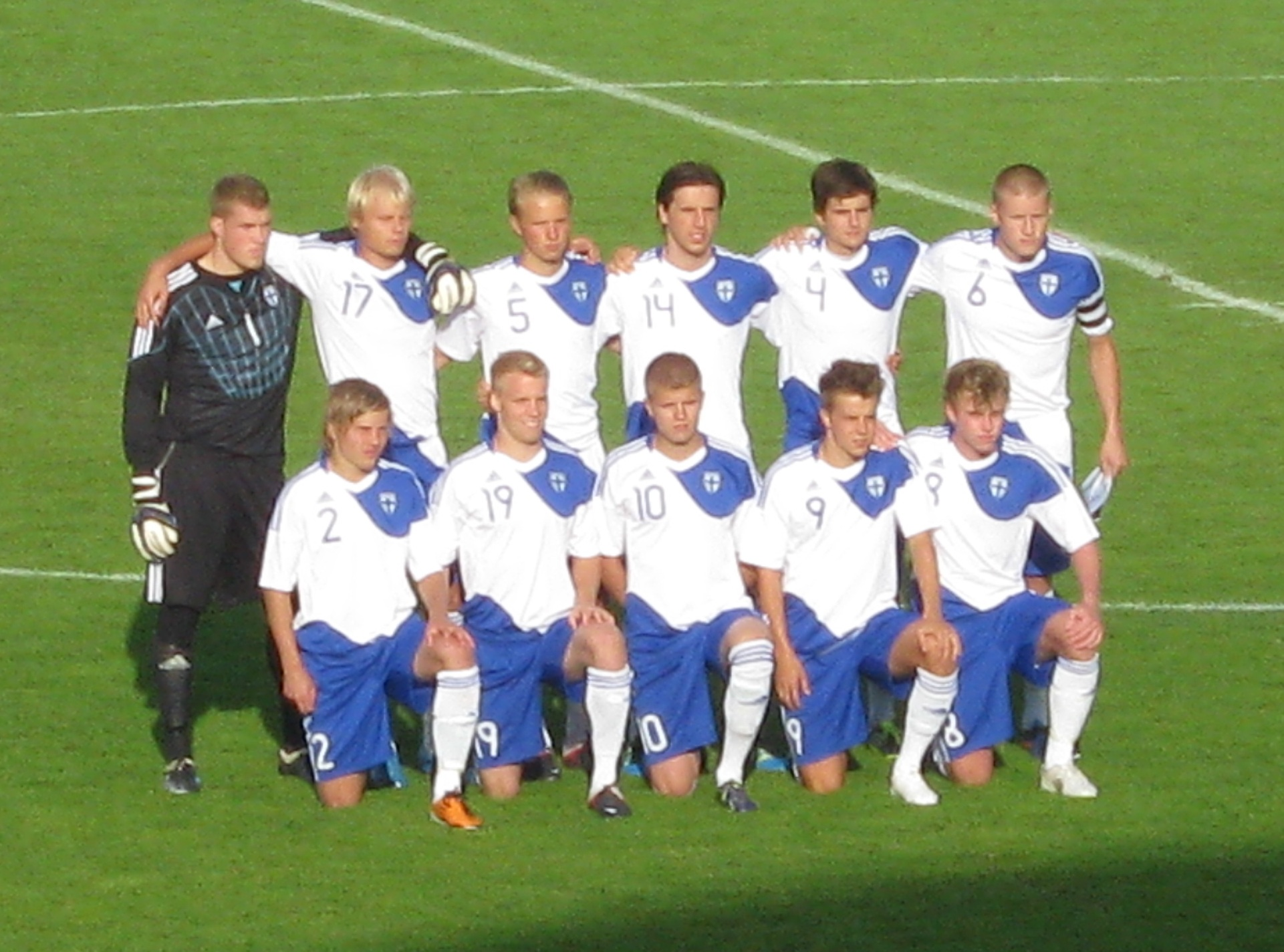
Finland U21 team before the match against Slovenia in Pori in 2011

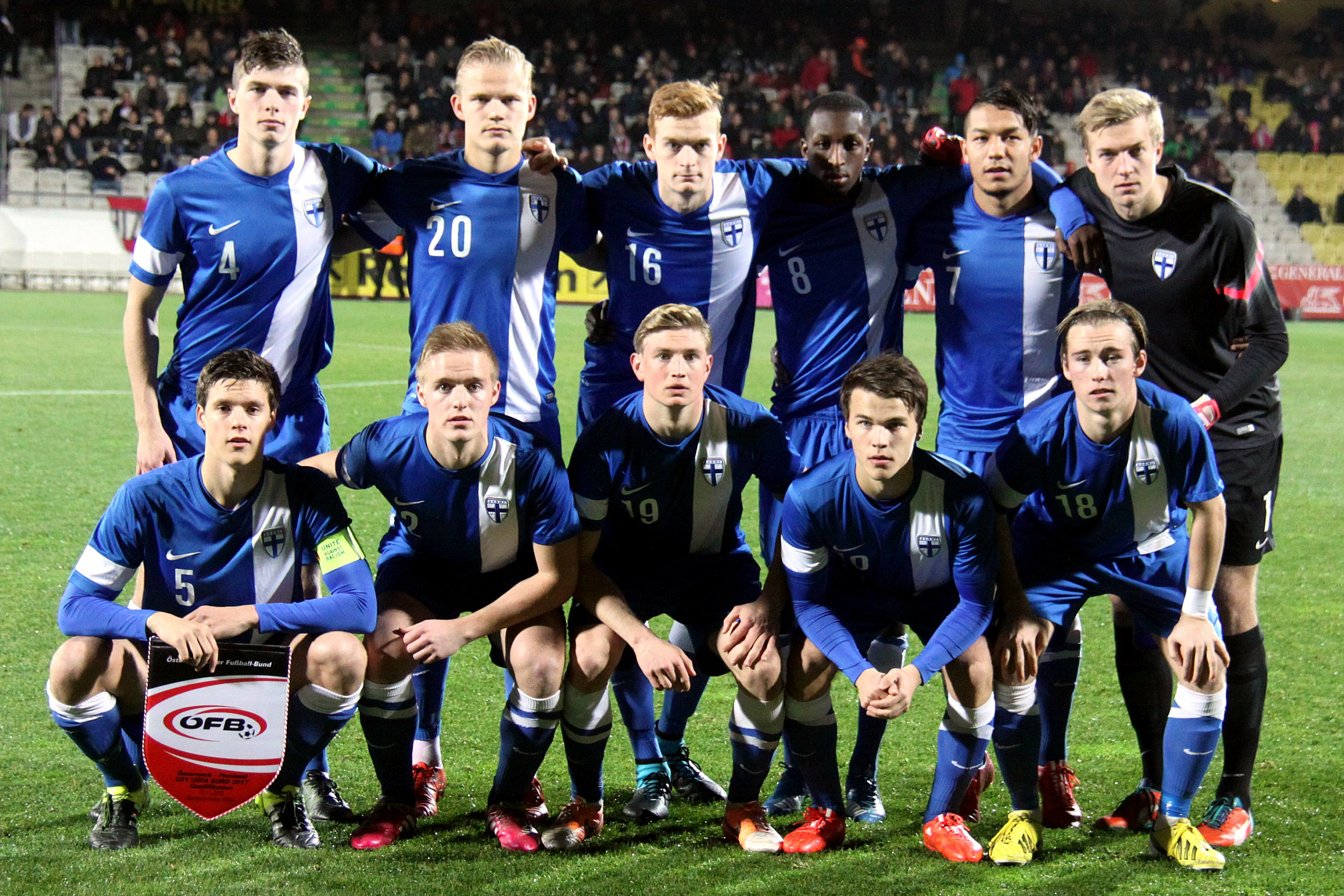
Finland U21 team before the match against Austria in 2015

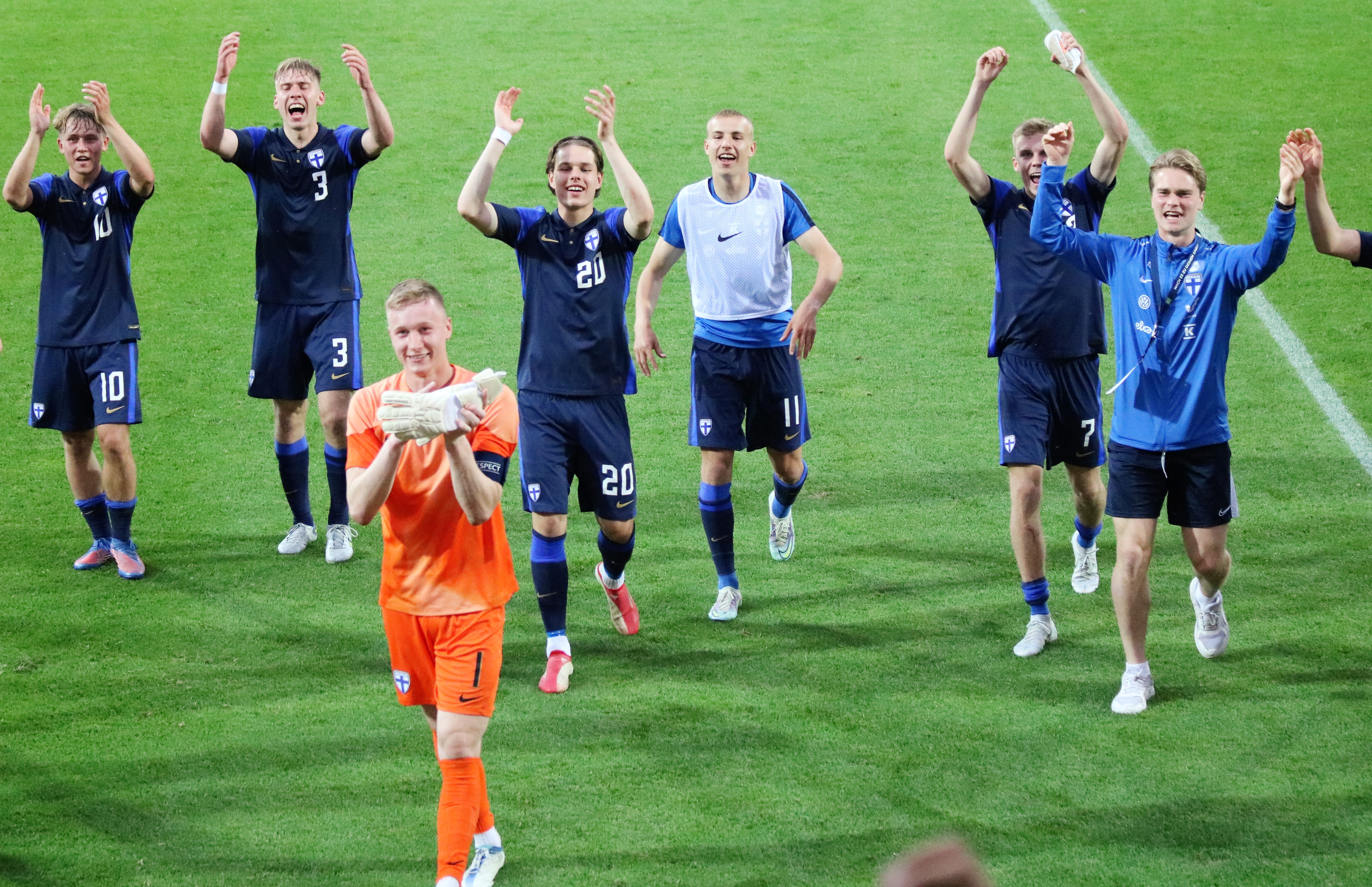
Finland U21 team after the win against Austria in Ried im Innkreis in 2022

Year	Round	Pld	W	D	L	GF	GA	Squad	Qualification Campaign	Pld	W	D	L	GF	GA
1972-1976 UEFA Under-23 European championships
1972	did not qualify								1972	4	0	1	3	4	10
1974	did not qualify								1974	4	1	1	2	3	8
1976	did not qualify								1976	4	0	0	4	2	12
Since 1978 UEFA Under-21 European championships
1978	did not qualify								1978	4	0	0	4	2	14
1980	did not qualify								1980	4	0	1	3	2	7
1982	did not qualify								1982	6	0	1	5	4	10
1984	did not qualify								1984	6	1	3	2	5	8
1986	did not qualify								1986	6	1	4	1	6	6
1988	did not qualify								1988	6	2	1	3	8	11
1990	did not qualify								1990	6	1	1	4	4	13
1992	did not qualify								1992	6	2	0	4	7	13
(France) 1994	did not qualify								1994	10	4	2	4	10	13
(Spain) 1996	did not qualify								1996	8	5	1	2	12	16
(Romania) 1998	did not qualify								1998	8	2	3	3	8	10
(Slovakia) 2000	did not qualify								2000	8	3	4	1	9	7
(Switzerland) 2002	did not qualify								2002	8	1	1	6	7	20
(Germany) 2004	did not qualify								2004	8	3	2	3	11	9
(Portugal) 2006	did not qualify								2006	10	2	1	7	7	16
(Netherlands) 2007	did not qualify								2007	2	0	0	2	1	10
(Sweden) 2009	Group stage	3	0	0	3	1	6	Squad	2009 (PO)	8	6	1	1	11	6
(Denmark) 2011	did not qualify								2011	8	3	1	4	11	4
(Israel) 2013	did not qualify								2013	10	3	3	4	12	14
(Czech Republic) 2015	did not qualify								2015	10	4	4	2	17	10
(Poland) 2017	did not qualify								2017	10	4	2	4	13	10
(Italy) 2019	did not qualify								2019	10	2	3	5	13	21
(Hungary) (Slovenia) 2021	did not qualify								2021	10	4	1	5	14	15
(Romania) (Georgia (country)) 2023	did not qualify								2023	10	6	1	3	18	13
(Slovakia) 2025	Group stage	3	0	2	1	4	6	Squad	2025 (PO)	12	7	2	3	27	11
(Albania) (Serbia) 2027	Qualified								2027 (PO)	12	8	3	1	37	9

=== 2009 UEFA Euro Under-21 qualification ===
Team	Pld	W	D	L	GF	GA	GD	Pts
Finland	8	6	1	1	11	6	+5	19
Denmark	8	5	1	2	13	4	+9	16
Scotland	8	5	1	2	17	6	+11	16
Slovenia	8	1	2	5	4	13	−9	5
Lithuania	8	0	1	7	2	18	−16	1

=== 2023 UEFA Euro Under-21 qualification ===
Pos	Team	Pld	W	D	L	GF	GA	GD	Pts	Qualification	Norway	Croatia	Finland	Austria	Azerbaijan	Estonia
1	Norway	10	8	0	2	26	11	+15	24	Final tournament	—	3–2	3–1	3–1	2–1	3–0
2	Croatia	10	7	1	2	25	10	+15	22	Play-offs	3–2	—	2–3	0–0	2–0	2–0
3	Finland	10	6	1	3	18	13	+5	19		0–2	0–2	—	3–1	3–0	1–0
4	Austria	10	5	1	4	22	13	+9	16		2–1	1–3	2–3	—	6–0	2–0
5	Azerbaijan	10	2	1	7	12	24	−12	7		1–2	1–5	1–1	0–3	—	3–0
6	Estonia	10	0	0	10	0	32	−32	0		0–5	0–4	0–3	0–4	0–5	—

Source: UEFA
Rules for classification: Tiebreakers

=== 2025 UEFA Euro Under-21 qualification ===
Pos	Team	Pld	W	D	L	GF	GA	GD	Pts	Qualification	Romania	Finland	Switzerland	Albania	Montenegro	Armenia
1	Romania	10	7	1	2	23	10	+13	22	Final tournament	—	1–0	3–1	5–0	1–0	2–0
2	Finland	10	6	2	2	21	8	+13	20	Play-offs	2–0	—	1–2	4–1	2–1	6–0
3	Switzerland	10	5	3	2	21	12	+9	18		2–2	1–1	—	1–2	4–2	5–0
4	Albania	10	5	1	4	12	17	−5	16		3–2	0–0	1–3	—	2–0	1–0
5	Montenegro	10	2	1	7	8	19	−11	7		2–6	1–2	0–2	1–0	—	0–0
6	Armenia	10	0	2	8	2	21	−19	2		0–1	1–3	0–0	1–2	0–1	—

Source: UEFA
Rules for classification: Tiebreakers

=== 2027 UEFA Euro Under-21 qualification ===
Pos	Team	Pld	W	D	L	GF	GA	GD	Pts	Qualification	Spain	Finland	Romania	Kosovo	Cyprus	San Marino
1	Spain	10	9	0	1	47	5	+42	27	Final tournament	—	2–1	7–1	2–0	3–0	7–0
2	Finland	10	7	2	1	34	7	+27	23	Play-offs	2–1	—	2–0	0–0	3–0	7–0
3	Romania	10	5	1	4	12	13	−1	16		0–2	0–2	—	0–0	2–0	3–0
4	Kosovo	10	4	3	3	21	11	+10	15		1–3	4–4	0–1	—	2–1	7–0
5	Cyprus	10	2	0	8	8	29	−21	6		0–7	0–5	0–3	0–4	—	2–0
6	San Marino	10	0	0	10	0	57	−57	0		0–13	0–8	0–2	0–3	0–5	—

Source: UEFA
Rules for classification: Tiebreakers

=== Other tournaments ===
Year	Round	Pos	Squad
2012 U21 Baltic Cup	Final	1st	Squad
2024 U21 Baltic Cup	Semi-finals	3rd	Squad

== Current squad ==
The following players have been called up in the squad for the 2027 UEFA European Under-21 Championship qualification play-offs matches against Republic of Ireland on 13 November and 17 November 2026, respectively.

- Caps and goals as of 17 November 2026 after the match against Republic of Ireland.
- Players in **bold** have been called up or have played at least one full international match with senior national team.

No.	Pos.	Player	Date of birth (age)	Caps	Goals	Club
1	GK	Jaaso Jantunen	31 January 2005 (age 21)	12	0	(German Football Association) Hansa Rostock
12	GK	Ukko Happonen	13 March 2007 (age 19)	1	0	(Italian Football Federation) Bologna
	GK	Aleksi Piispa	18 December 2005 (age 20)	1	0	(Football Association of Finland) VPS
3	DF	**Tomas Galvez**	28 January 2005 (age 21)	20	1	(Royal Dutch Football Association) Go Ahead Eagles
4	DF	Arttu Lötjönen	28 January 2004 (age 22)	11	2	(Football Association of Finland) KuPS
5	DF	Oskari Väistö	15 September 2005 (age 21)	4	0	(Football Association of Finland) SJK
16	DF	**Samuli Miettinen**	16 June 2004 (age 22)	8	0	(Croatian Football Federation) Istra 1961
21	DF	Ilari Kangasniemi	22 April 2007 (age 19)	7	0	(The Football Association) Leicester City
22	DF	**Miska Ylitolva**	23 May 2004 (age 22)	32	3	(Swedish Football Association) Kalmar
	DF	Akseli Puukko	24 August 2006 (age 20)	4	0	(Football Association of Finland) KuPS
	DF	Kaius Simojoki	21 March 2006 (age 20)	2	0	(Football Association of Finland) HJK
2	MF	Niilo Kujasalo	17 March 2004 (age 22)	4	0	(Football Association of Finland) KuPS
6	MF	**Matias Siltanen**	29 March 2007 (age 19)	14	6	(Swedish Football Association) Djurgårdens IF
8	MF	Pyry Mentu	1 November 2006 (age 20)	11	1	(Football Association of Finland) HJK
10	MF	**Luka Hyryläinen**	25 August 2004 (age 22)	21	2	(German Football Association) 1. FC Magdeburg
11	MF	Marius Söderbäck	6 February 2004 (age 22)	14	5	(Swedish Football Association) Kalmar
17	MF	Otto Ruoppi	31 January 2006 (age 20)	12	4	(German Football Association) Mainz 05
18	MF	Gabriel Europaeus	14 May 2005 (age 21)	4	0	(Football Association of Finland) Gnistan
19	MF	Tuomas Pippola	12 October 2004 (age 22)	4	0	(Norwegian Football Federation) Sogndal
20	MF	Liam Möller	21 December 2004 (age 21)	13	0	(Football Association of Finland) HJK
	MF	Samuel Pasanen	31 January 2006 (age 20)	0	0	(Football Association of Finland) KuPS
7	FW	Lauri Laine	30 May 2005 (age 21)	1	1	(Football Association of Finland) Inter Turku
9	FW	Onni Helén	19 January 2006 (age 20)	10	5	(Norwegian Football Federation) Sogndal
15	FW	Toivo Mero	7 October 2007 (age 19)	4	1	(Royal Dutch Football Association) De Graafschap

=== Recent callups ===
The following players have also been called up to the Finland under-21 squad and remain eligible:

Pos.	Player	Date of birth (age)	Caps	Goals	Club	Latest call-up
GK	Osku Maukonen	15 February 2007 (age 19)	1	0	(Finland) HJK	v. Republic of Ireland, 13 November 2026 ^{INJ}
GK	Oliver Heino	30 May 2005 (age 21)	0	0	(Finland) EIF	v. Cyprus, 31 March 2026
GK	Eero Vuorjoki	9 July 2006 (age 20)	0	0	(Finland) Inter Turku	v. Cyprus, 31 March 2026
DF	Eetu Turkki	31 January 2007 (age 19)	3	0	(Finland) TPS	v. Kosovo, 6 October 2026
DF	Daniel Armstrong	24 March 2005 (age 21)	4	0	(Greece) Asteras Tripolis B	v. Norway, 8 June 2026
DF	Emil Leveälahti	22 August 2006 (age 20)	3	0	(Finland) HJK	v. Norway, 8 June 2026
DF	Oscar Häggström	24 April 2004 (age 22)	2	0	(Finland) TPS	v. Norway, 8 June 2026
DF	**Rony Jansson**	10 January 2004 (age 22)	18	0	(Germany) FC St. Pauli	v. Cyprus, 31 March 2026
MF	Jimi Tauriainen	8 March 2004 (age 22)	5	1	(Denmark) Horsens	v. Republic of Ireland, 13 November 2026 ^{INJ}
MF	Adam Jouhi	20 September 2006 (age 20)	0	0	(Finland) Gnistan	v. Kosovo, 6 October 2026
MF	Otso Liimatta	10 July 2004 (age 22)	31	9	(Sweden) Sirius	v. Norway, 8 June 2026
MF	Julius Paananen	26 November 2006 (age 19)	2	0	(Finland) AC Oulu	v. Norway, 8 June 2026
MF	Altti Hellemaa	25 July 2004 (age 22)	2	0	(Finland) Jaro	v. Cyprus, 31 March 2026
FW	**Juho Talvitie**	25 March 2005 (age 21)	25	4	(Belgium) Lommel	v. Republic of Ireland, 13 November 2026 ^{INJ}
FW	Julius Körkkö	3 July 2006 (age 20)	4	1	(Denmark) Horsens	v. Kosovo, 6 October 2026
FW	David Ezeh	13 February 2006 (age 20)	4	1	(Finland) HJK	v. Norway, 8 June 2026
FW	Jesse Kilo	15 January 2004 (age 22)	2	0	(Finland) Ilves	v. Norway, 8 June 2026
FW	**Adrian Svanbäck**	8 June 2004 (age 22)	2	4	(Sweden) Häcken	v. Sweden, 4 June 2026 ^{INJ}
FW	Vincent Ulundu	25 March 2005 (age 21)	3	0	(Finland) Inter Turku	v. Cyprus, 31 March 2026
Notes: ^{INJ} = Withdrew due to an injury; ^{ILL} = Withdrew due to an illness; ^{WD} = Withdrew due to a non-injury issue; ^{PRE} = Preliminary squad / standby

== Coaching staff ==
Position	Name
Head coach	(Finland) Mika Lehkosuo
Assistant coach	(Finland) Matti Lähitie
Goalkeeping coach	(Finland) Eemeli Reponen
Video analyst	(Finland) Robert Nygård
Fitness coach	(Finland) Mika Lähderinne

=== Past squads ===
- 2009 UEFA European Under-21 Football Championship squad

== See also ==
- Finland national football team
- Finland national under-19 football team
- Finland national under-18 football team
- Finland national under-17 football team
- Finland national under-16 football team
- Finland national under-21 football team at UEFA web pages
