= Leon Frokaj =

Kosovar footballer

Personal information
- Date of birth: 23 April 2005 (age 21)
- Place of birth: Wolhusen, Switzerland
- Height: 1.83 m (6 ft 0 in)
- Position: Midfielder

Team information
- Current team: St. Gallen
- Number: 20

Youth career
- FC Wolhusen
- –2019: Luzern
- 2019–2024: Basel

Senior career*
| Years | Team | Apps | (Gls) |
| 2022–2025 | Basel U21 | 39 | (4) |
| 2025–2026 | Aarau | 31 | (3) |
| 2026– | St. Gallen | 7 | (1) |

International career^{‡}
| 2021–2022 | Switzerland U17 | 8 | (2) |
| 2022–2023 | Switzerland U18 | 4 | (0) |
| 2024– | Kosovo U21 | 13 | (4) |
- * Club domestic league appearances and goals as of 12 September 2026 ‡ National team caps and goals as of 24 September 2026

Leon Frokaj (born 23 April 2005) is a professional footballer who plays as a midfielder for Swiss Super League club St. Gallen. Born in Switzerland, he is a Kosovo youth international.

== Club career ==
=== Early career ===
Frokaj began his career with FC Wolhusen before joining Luzern. At the age of 14, he moved to Basel, where he continued his development in the club's youth system. From 2022 to 2025, Frokaj also played for the club's under-21 team in the Swiss Promotion League.

=== Aarau ===
On 7 July 2025, Frokaj signed a three-year contract with Swiss Challenge League club Aarau. On 1 August 2025, he made his debut as professional footballer in a 3–1 away win against Wil after coming on as a substitute at last minutes in place of Valon Fazliu.

During the 2025–26 season, Frokaj became a regular member of Aarau's first team. Aarau reported that he made 36 competitive appearances and scored four goals during the season.

=== St. Gallen ===
On 1 June 2026, Frokaj signed a four-year contract with Swiss Super League club St. Gallen and was assigned squad number 20.

== International career ==
From 2021 until 2023, Frokaj was part of Switzerland at youth international level, respectively representing the U17, and U18 teams, and he with these teams played twelve matches and scored two goals. On 9 November 2024, Frokaj received a call-up from Kosovo U21 for the friendly matches against North Macedonia, and made his debut in the first match after being named in the starting line-up.

On 15 August 2025, Frokaj's request to switch international allegiance to Kosovo was approved by FIFA, allowing him to play in competitive matches.

In August 2026, Frokaj in an interview for Koha Ditore hoped to receive his first call-up to the Kosovo senior national team. On 18 September 2026, he received a call-up from the Kosovo national senior team for the 2026–27 UEFA Nations League matches against the Republic of Ireland, Austria (twice), and Israel.
