= Jacek Berensztajn =

Polish footballer (born 1973)

Personal information
- Date of birth: 16 October 1973 (age 53)
- Place of birth: Piotrków Trybunalski, Poland
- Height: 1.76 m (5 ft 9 in)
- Position: Midfielder

Team information
- Current team: Grabka Grabica
- Number: 23

Senior career*
Years	Team	Apps	(Gls)
1990–1993	GKS Bełchatów		
1994	Siarka Tarnobrzeg	14	(1)
1994–1997	GKS Bełchatów		
1997–1998	SV Ried	42	(1)
1998–2000	GKS Bełchatów		
2001	Odra Wodzisław Śląski	14	(2)
2001–2003	GKS Bełchatów	17	(0)
2003–2004	RKS Radomsko	33	(11)
2005–2006	KSZO Ostrowiec Świętokrzyski	50	(11)
2006–2007	Zagłębie Sosnowiec	46	(7)
2008–2012	Włókniarz Zelów		
2014	Warta Osjaków		
2015	Czarni Rząśnia		
2015	Orkan Buczek		
2016–2018	LUKS Gomunice		
2018–2020	Zjednoczeni Bełchatów	28	(21)
2020–2023	EBE SPN Bełchatów	33	(7)
2024–	Grabka Grabica	16	(6)

International career
1996–1997	Poland	2	(0)

Managerial career
- 2012–2013: Włókniarz Zelów
- 2013–2014: Zawisza Pajęczno
- 2015–2018: Orkan Buczek
- 2018–2019: GUKS Gorzkowice
- 2019: LUKS Gomunice
- 2019–2020: Omega Kleszczów
- * Club domestic league appearances and goals as of 2 October 2024

Jacek Berensztajn (born 16 October 1973) is a Polish footballer who plays as a midfielder for Grabka Grabica.

Berensztajn made two appearances for the Poland national football team.

== Honours ==
SV Ried

- Austrian Cup: 1997–98

EBE SPN Bełchatów

- Klasa B Piotrków Trybunalski II: 2020–21
