= Ioan Vermeșan =

Romanian footballer

Personal information
- Date of birth: 18 October 2006 (age 20)
- Place of birth: Timișoara, Romania
- Height: 1.85 m (6 ft 1 in)
- Position: Forward

Team information
- Current team: Widzew Łódź (on loan from Hellas Verona)
- Number: 90

Youth career
- –2012: LPS Banatul Timișoara
- 2012–2018: ACS Poli Timișoara
- 2018–2019: Gheorghe Hagi Academy
- 2019–2021: Juventus Timișoara
- 2021–2022: UTA Arad
- 2022: → Ripensia Timișoara (loan)
- 2022–: Hellas Verona

Senior career*
Years	Team	Apps	(Gls)
2022	Ripensia Timișoara	5	(0)
2025–	Hellas Verona	6	(0)
2026–	→ Widzew Łódź (loan)	3	(0)
2026–	→ Widzew Łódź II (loan)	1	(0)

International career^{‡}
2022	Romania U16	2	(2)
2021–2023	Romania U17	10	(4)
2023–2024	Romania U18	6	(1)
2024–2025	Romania U19	13	(4)
2026–	Romania U20	2	(0)
2025–	Romania U21	9	(3)
- * Club domestic league appearances and goals as of 12:17, 9 November 2026 (UTC) ‡ National team caps and goals as of 23:37, 17 November 2026 (UTC)

Ioan Vermeșan (born 18 October 2006) is a Romanian professional footballer who plays as a forward for Ekstraklasa club Widzew Łódź, on loan from Serie B club Hellas Verona.

== Career statistics ==
As of match played 7 November 2026

Appearances and goals by club, season and competition
Club	Season	League			National cup (Note: Includes Cupa României, Coppa Italia)		Europe		Other		Total	
Club	Season	Division	Apps	Goals	Apps	Goals	Apps	Goals	Apps	Goals	Apps	Goals
Ripensia Timișoara	2022–23	Liga II	5	0	1	2	—		—		6	2
Hellas Verona	2025–26	Serie A	6	0	1	0	—		—		7	0
Widzew Łódź (loan)	2026–27	Ekstraklasa	3	0	—		—		—		3	0
Widzew Łódź II (loan)	2026–27	III liga, group I	1	0	—		—		—		1	0
Career total			15	0	2	2	—		—		17	2
