= Romania national under-21 football team =

National under-21 association football team representing Romania

Romania Under-21
- Nickname: Tricolorii Mici (The Small Tricolours)
- Association: Romanian Football Federation (FRF)
- Head coach: Costin Curelea
- Captain: Cătălin Vulturar
- Most caps: Alexandru Pașcanu (29)
- Top scorer: George Pușcaș (18)
- Home stadium: Various
First colours	Second colours	Third colours

Biggest win
- Armenia 0–5 Romania (Yerevan, Armenia; 16 November 2004); Azerbaijan 0–5 Romania (Trabzon, Turkey; 25 April 1995)

Biggest defeat
- Germany 8–0 Romania (Magdeburg, Germany; 9 September 2014)

UEFA U-21 Championship
- Appearances: 4 (first in 1998)
- Best result: Semi-finals (2019)

The Romania national under-21 football team, also known as Romania under-21s or Romania U21(s), is considered to be the feeder team for the Romania national football team.

This team is for Romanian players aged under 21 at the start of the calendar year in which a two-year UEFA European Under-21 Championship campaign begins, so some players can remain with the squad until the age of 23. As long as they are eligible, players can play for Romania at any level, making it possible to play for the U21s, senior side, and again for the U21s. It is also possible to play for one country at youth level and another at senior level (providing the player has not played a senior competitive game in his previous country.)

== History ==
The U-21 team came into existence, following the realignment of UEFA's youth competitions, in 1976. Romania qualified for the 1998 UEFA European Under-21 Championship, and under Victor Pițurcă reached the quarter-finals, where they were knocked out by the Netherlands. Romania had been 1–0 up, but were eventually beaten 2–1. The Romanian lineup included players like: Cosmin Contra, Bogdan Lobonț, Cătălin Munteanu, Ionel Dănciulescu and Ion Luțu.

Romania once again qualified unbeaten for the finals after topping their group in the qualifying series. The Romanians reached semi-final of the UEFA European Under-21 Championship for the first time in their history in the 2019 UEFA Under-21 Euro but eventually lost 4–2 to defending champions Germany who scored twice in the dying moments. Romania qualified for the 2020 Summer Olympics for their first Olympics since 1964. Overall, Romania was a revelation at the tournament, beating both England and Croatia (4-2 and 4–1), and looked on course for a shock before Germany fought back to make the final.

Romania U21s do not have a permanent home. They play in stadia dotted all around Romania, in an attempt to encourage younger fans in all areas of the country to get behind Romania. Because of the lower demand compared to the senior national team, smaller grounds can be used.

== Competitive record ==
=== UEFA U-21 Championship Record ===
UEFA European Under-21 Championship Championship record								UEFA European Under-21 Football Championship Qualification record					
Year	Round	Pld	W	D*	L	GF	GA	Pld	W	D	L	GF	GA
1978	did not qualify							4	1	0	3	5	8
1980	did not qualify							4	2	0	2	7	3
1982	did not qualify							6	2	1	3	9	12
1984	did not qualify							6	2	1	3	8	12
1986	did not qualify							6	1	4	1	5	7
1988	did not qualify							6	3	0	3	7	7
1990	did not qualify							6	3	0	3	8	7
1992	did not qualify							6	2	0	4	5	9
(France) 1994	did not qualify							8	5	0	3	13	10
(Spain) 1996	did not qualify							10	4	4	2	17	10
(Romania) 1998	Quarter-finals	3	0	0	3	2	5	8	8	0	0	18	4
(Slovakia) 2000	did not qualify							8	3	3	2	10	8
(Switzerland) 2002	did not qualify							8	5	1	2	13	5
(Germany) 2004	did not qualify							8	2	1	5	6	7
(Portugal) 2006	did not qualify							10	6	1	3	17	8
(Netherlands) 2007	did not qualify							2	1	0	1	4	5
(Sweden) 2009	did not qualify							8	4	3	1	11	3
(Denmark) 2011	did not qualify							10	8	1	1	23	6
(Israel) 2013	did not qualify							8	4	2	2	11	6
(Czech Republic) 2015	did not qualify							8	3	3	2	14	19
(Poland) 2017	did not qualify							10	5	1	4	15	14
(Italy) (San Marino) 2019	Semi-finals	4	2	1	1	10	7	10	7	3	0	19	4
(Hungary) (Slovenia) 2021	Group stage	3	1	2	0	3	2	10	6	2	2	22	7
(Romania) (Georgia (country)) 2023	Group stage	3	0	1	2	0	4	Qualified as hosts					
(Slovakia) 2025	Group stage	3	0	0	3	2	5	10	7	1	2	23	10
(Albania) (Serbia) 2027	did not qualify							10	5	1	4	12	13
Total	5/26	16	3	4	9	17	23	180	99	33	58	303	204

=== Olympic Games ===
Football at the Summer Olympics was first played officially in 1908. The Olympiads between 1896 and 1980 was only open for amateur players. The 1984 and 1988 tournaments were open to players with no appearances in the FIFA World Cup. After the 1988 Olympics, the football event was changed into a tournament for U23 or U21 teams with a maximum of three older players. See Romania national football team for competition record from 1908 until 1988.

Olympic Games record									Olympic Games Qualification record **					
Year	Round	Position	Pld	W	D *	L	GF	GA	Pld	W	D	L	GF	GA
(Spain) 1992	did not qualify								6	2	0	4	5	9
(United States) 1996	did not qualify								10	4	4	2	17	10
(Australia) 2000	did not qualify								8	3	3	2	10	8
(Greece) 2004	did not qualify								8	2	1	5	6	7
(China) 2008	did not qualify								2	1	0	1	4	5
(United Kingdom) 2012	did not qualify								10	8	1	1	23	6
(Brazil) 2016	did not qualify								8	3	3	2	14	19
(Japan) 2020	Group Stage	11th	3	1	1	1	4	7	14	9	4	1	29	11
(France) 2024	did not qualify								3	0	1	2	0	4
(United States) 2028	did not qualify								10	5	1	4	12	13

*Denotes draws include knockout matches decided on penalty kicks.
**Includes both qualification phase and final tournament of UEFA European Under-21 Championship.
***Gold background color indicates that the tournament was won. Red border color indicates tournament was held on home soil.

=== EURO 2027 ===
Pos	Team	Pld	W	D	L	GF	GA	GD	Pts	Qualification	Spain	Finland	Romania	Kosovo	Cyprus	San Marino
1	Spain	10	9	0	1	47	5	+42	27	Final tournament	—	2–1	7–1	2–0	3–0	7–0
2	Finland	10	7	2	1	34	7	+27	23	Play-offs	2–1	—	2–0	0–0	3–0	7–0
3	Romania	10	5	1	4	12	13	−1	16		0–2	0–2	—	0–0	2–0	3–0
4	Kosovo	10	4	3	3	21	11	+10	15		1–3	4–4	0–1	—	2–1	7–0
5	Cyprus	10	2	0	8	8	29	−21	6		0–7	0–5	0–3	0–4	—	2–0
6	San Marino	10	0	0	10	0	57	−57	0		0–13	0–8	0–2	0–3	0–5	—

Source: UEFA

== Results and fixtures ==
The following is a list of matches in the last 12 months, as well as any future matches that have been scheduled.

Legend

Win Draw Lose Fixture

=== 2025 ===
14 November 2025 2027 UEFA Q	Finland	2–0	Romania	Turku, Finland
17:00 UTC+2	Ruoppi 23'; Siltanen 73' (pen.)	Report		Stadium: Kupittaa Football Stadium; Attendance: 1,503; Referee: Dario Bel (Croatia)

18 November 2025 2027 UEFA Q	Romania	0–2	Spain	Sibiu, Romania
19:00 UTC+2		Report	G. García 17'; Fresneda 53'	Stadium: Sibiu Municipal Stadium; Attendance: 9,732; Referee: Matteo Marchetti (Italy)

=== 2026 ===
27 March 2026 2027 UEFA Q	Kosovo	0–1	Romania	Pristina, Kosovo
20:00 UTC+2		Report	Vermeșan 66'	Stadium: Fadil Vokrri Stadium; Attendance: 13,980; Referee: Iwan Griffith (Wales)

31 March 2026 2027 UEFA Q	Romania	3–0	San Marino	Târgoviște, Romania
19:00 UTC+3	Musi 43', 58'; Mazilu 63'	Report		Stadium: Eugen Popescu Stadium; Attendance: 1,755; Referee: Artem Gasparyan (Armenia)

25 September 2026 2027 UEFA Q	Cyprus	0–3	Romania	Larnaca, Cyprus
19:00 UTC+3		Report	Vermeșan 34' (pen.), 44'; Ciubotaru 89'	Stadium: AEK Arena – Georgios Karapatakis; Attendance: 262; Referee: Lukáš Dzivjak (Slovakia)

30 September 2026 2027 UEFA Q	Romania	0–2	Finland	Târgoviște, Romania
19:00 UTC+3		Report	Hyryläinen 28'; Mero 85'	Stadium: Eugen Popescu Stadium; Attendance: 4,336; Referee: Dario Bel (Croatia)

6 October 2026 2027 UEFA Q	Spain	7–1	Romania	Ibiza, Spain
20:00 UTC+3	P. García 34', 45', 47'; Gasiorowski 51'; G. García 44', 53'; Bravo 64' (pen.)	Report	Burnete 27'	Stadium: Estadi Municipal de Can Misses; Attendance: 3,750; Referee: Matteo Marcenaro (Italy)

== Players ==
=== Current squad ===
The following players were called up for the 2027 UEFA European Under-21 Championship qualification Group A matches against Cyprus, Finland and Spain on 25 and 30 September and 6 October 2026 respectively.

Note: Names in italics denote players that have been called up to the senior team.

Caps and goals are correct as of 7 October 2026, after the match against Spain.

No.	Pos.	Player	Date of birth (age)	Caps	Goals	Club
	GK	Ștefan Lefter	18 November 2004 (age 21)	9	0	(Romanian Football Federation) Universitatea Cluj
12	GK	Codruț Sandu	17 April 2006 (age 20)	1	0	(Romanian Football Federation) Corvinul Hunedoara
23	GK	Rafael Munteanu	1 March 2006 (age 20)	1	0	(Romanian Football Federation) Farul Constanța
3	DF	Matteo Duțu	23 November 2005 (age 20)	14	0	(Romanian Football Federation) Dinamo București
19	DF	Kevin Ciubotaru	2 February 2004 (age 22)	7	1	(Scottish Football Association) Dundee United
5	DF	Răzvan Pașcalău	5 May 2004 (age 22)	5	0	(Italian Football Federation) Cosenza
4	DF	Mario Bărăitaru	8 December 2006 (age 19)	2	0	(Romanian Football Federation) Slatina
6	DF	Ricardo Pădurariu	23 May 2007 (age 19)	1	0	(Romanian Football Federation) FCSB
15	DF	David Irimia	12 May 2006 (age 20)	1	0	(Romanian Football Federation) Dinamo București
2	DF	Alexandru Șuteu	3 March 2004 (age 22)	1	0	(Romanian Football Federation) Voluntari
14	DF	Darius Fălcușan	14 February 2006 (age 20)	0	0	(Romanian Football Federation) Concordia Chiajna
	MF	Cătălin Vulturar (captain)	9 March 2004 (age 22)	18	1	(Romanian Football Federation) Rapid București
21	MF	Cristian Mihai	23 September 2004 (age 22)	15	2	(Romanian Football Federation) Dinamo București
22	MF	Lorenzo Biliboc	22 October 2006 (age 20)	10	1	(Romanian Football Federation) CFR Cluj
10	MF	Eduard Radaslavescu	30 July 2004 (age 22)	6	0	(Romanian Football Federation) Farul Constanța
16	MF	Raul Cîmpean	9 October 2005 (age 21)	3	0	(Romanian Football Federation) Sepsi OSK
17	MF	Yanis Pîrvu	2 April 2007 (age 19)	2	0	(Romanian Football Federation) Argeș Pitești
18	MF	Iustin Doicaru	7 February 2007 (age 19)	2	0	(Turkish Football Federation) Rizespor
	MF	Remus Guțea	2 November 2006 (age 20)	2	0	(Romanian Football Federation) Voluntari
	MF	Alexandru Stoian	15 December 2007 (age 18)	1	0	(Romanian Football Federation) FCSB
8	MF	Luca Banu	31 January 2005 (age 21)	1	0	(Romanian Football Federation) Farul Constanța
11	FW	Rareș Burnete	31 January 2004 (age 22)	15	2	(Italian Football Federation) Südtirol
9	FW	Atanas Trică	9 July 2004 (age 22)	11	2	(Cyprus Football Association) AEK Larnaca
20	FW	Ioan Vermeșan	18 October 2006 (age 20)	9	3	(Polish Football Association) Widzew Łódź

=== Recent call-ups ===
Players born in or after 2006 are eligible for the 2029 UEFA European Under-21 Championship.

The following players have also been called up in the past to the Romania under-21 squad and remain eligible to play in the qualification matches for 2029 UEFA European Under-21 Championship:

Pos.	Player	Date of birth (age)	Caps	Goals	Club	Latest call-up
MF	Luca Szimionaș	3 September 2006 (age 20)	6	0	(Romania) Universitatea Cluj	v. San Marino, 31 March 2026
MF	David Matei	19 July 2006 (age 20)	3	0	(Romania) Universitatea Craiova	v. San Marino, 31 March 2026
MF	Luca Băsceanu	17 May 2006 (age 20)	1	0	(Romania) Universitatea Craiova	v. San Marino, 31 March 2026

Notes

- ^{INJ} = Player withdrew from the squad due to an injury
- ^{SUS} = Player is serving suspension
- ^{WD} = Player withdrew from the squad
- ^{COV} = Player withdrawn from the squad due to positive COVID-19 test
- Names in italics denote players that have been capped for the Senior team.

== Coaching staff ==
Role	Name
Head coach	(Romania) Costin Curelea
Assistant coaches	(Romania) Lucian Sânmartean (Romania) Răzvan Rotaru
Goalkeeping coach	(Romania) Răzvan Stanca
Fitness Coach	(Romania) Daniel Ene
Video Analyst	(Romania) Rareş Tātar
Doctor	(Romania) Dan Costin
Physioterapists	(Romania) Florin Dragne (Romania) Mădălin Tălpălaru
Masseur	(Romania) Vladimir Foia
Kit man	(Romania) Ionuț Niculici

== See also ==
- Romania national football team
- Romania Olympic football team
