= Lorenzo Biliboc =

Footballer (born 2006)

Personal information
- Date of birth: 22 October 2006 (age 20)
- Place of birth: Ivrea, Italy
- Height: 1.70 m (5 ft 7 in)
- Positions: Winger; forward

Team information
- Current team: CFR Cluj
- Number: 17

Youth career
- –2020: Torino
- 2020–2025: Juventus
- 2023–2024: → Parma (loan)

Senior career*
Years	Team	Apps	(Gls)
2025–	CFR Cluj	46	(9)

International career^{‡}
2023	Romania U17	2	(0)
2025–	Romania U21	10	(1)
- * Club domestic league appearances and goals as of 31 October 2026 ‡ National team caps and goals as of 6 October 2026

Lorenzo Biliboc (born 22 October 2006) is a professional footballer who plays as a winger or forward for Liga I club CFR Cluj. Born in Italy, he plays for the Romania under-21 national team.

== Club career ==
A youth product of Torino, Juventus, and Parma, Biliboc signed for Liga I club CFR Cluj in July 2025. On 21 September 2025, Biliboc scored his first goal for the club in a 1–1 draw with UTA Arad. He scored his second goal on 30 September, in a 2–2 draw with Universitatea Cluj.

== International career ==
In 2023, Biliboc made his debut for the Romanian national teams, appearing in one match for the U17 squad.

== Personal life ==
Biliboc holds dual Italian and Romanian citizenship.

== Career statistics ==
As of match played 31 October 2026

Appearances and goals by club, season and competition
Club	Season	League			Cupa României		Continental		Total	
Club	Season	Division	Apps	Goals	Apps	Goals	Apps	Goals	Apps	Goals
CFR Cluj	2025–26	Liga I	34	7	4	1	1 (Note: Appearances in UEFA Conference League)	0	39	8
CFR Cluj	2026–27	Liga I	12	2	2	0	4	0	18	2
Career total			46	9	6	1	5	0	57	10
