= Juho Talvitie =

Finnish footballer (born 2005)

Personal information
- Full name: Juho Jaakko Talvitie
- Date of birth: 25 March 2005 (age 21)
- Place of birth: Tampere, Finland
- Height: 1.86 m (6 ft 1 in)
- Position: Winger

Team information
- Current team: Lommel
- Number: 7

Youth career
- –2021: Ilves

Senior career*
Years	Team	Apps	(Gls)
2021–	Lommel	52	(6)
2024–2025	→ Heracles Almelo (loan)	31	(3)
2025–2026	→ NAC Breda (loan)	27	(3)

International career^{‡}
2019	Finland U15	3	(0)
2021–2022	Finland U17	7	(1)
2023	Finland U18	2	(0)
2022	Finland U19	5	(2)
2023–	Finland U21	23	(4)
2024–	Finland	2	(0)
- * Club domestic league appearances and goals as of 22 July 2026 ‡ National team caps and goals as of 1 April 2026

Juho Jaakko Talvitie (born 25 March 2005) is a Finnish professional footballer who plays as a winger for Belgian Pro League club Lommel and the Finland national team.

== Early career ==
Talvitie started playing football in Ilves in Tampere. In 2020, Talvitie trialed for the youth academy of English Premier League side Manchester United.

== Club career ==
=== Lommel ===
In 2021, he signed for Belgian First Division B club Lommel. On 15 September 2021, he debuted for 4–2 win over Diegem Sport in a Belgian Cup game. He made his Belgian First Division B debut on 1 October 2021 against Westerlo. During season 2021–22 he made six appearances in league matches and one in the Belgian Cup. In the 2023–24 season, Talvitie made 35 appearances for Lommel in all competitions, scoring four goals and providing three assists. He played six games in the Belgian Pro League Promotion Play-offs.

==== Heracles Almelo (loan) ====
On 19 July 2024, Talvitie extended his contract with Lommel until June 2028, and simultaneously he was loaned out to Eredivisie club Heracles Almelo for the 2024–25 season with no option to buy. On 25 August 2024, in the third match of the season, Talvitie scored his first goal in Eredivisie, in a 1–1 draw against Willem II.

==== NAC Breda (loan) ====
On 11 June 2025, Eredivisie club NAC Breda announced that they had loaned in Talvitie for the 2025–26 season. On 17 August, in his second match for Breda, Talvitie scored the winning goal in a 2–1 home win against Fortuna Sittard.

== International career ==
=== Youth ===
Talvitie made his debut in international football in Algarve on 22 November 2019 at the age 15 playing for Finland U15 in a 3–2 defeat against Spain U15.

Talvitie has been capped at under-17, under-18 and under-19 youth international levels for Finland. Since 2023, he has played for Finland under-21 national team. On 21 November 2023, Talvitie scored his first U21 goal, in a 6–0 home win over Armenia.

=== Senior ===
On 4 June 2024, Talvitie made his senior national team debut for Finland, as a starter in a 4–2 friendly defeat against Portugal.

== Career statistics ==
=== Club ===
As of 18 May 2026

Appearances and goals by club, season and competition
Club	Season	League			National cup (Note: Includes Belgian Cup and KNVB Cup)		Continental		Other		Total	
Club	Season	Division	Apps	Goals	Apps	Goals	Apps	Goals	Apps	Goals	Apps	Goals
Lommel	2021–22	Challenger Pro League	6	0	1	0	–		–		7	0
Lommel	2022–23	Challenger Pro League	17	3	0	0	–		–		17	3
Lommel	2023–24	Challenger Pro League	29	3	0	0	–		6 (Note: Includes Belgian Pro League Promotion Play-offs)	1	35	4
Lommel	Total		52	6	1	0	0	0	6	1	59	7
Heracles Almelo (loan)	2024–25	Eredivisie	31	3	5	1	–		–		36	4
NAC Breda (loan)	2025–26	Eredivisie	27	3	1	0	–		–		28	3
Career total			111	12	7	1	0	0	6	1	124	14

=== International ===
As of match played 7 June 2024

Finland
Year	Apps	Goals
2024	2	0
Total	2	0

== Honours ==
Individual

- Football Association of Finland: The Boy Player of the Year: 2021
