= Cansino =

Cansino may refer to:

== People ==
- The Cansino family
  - Jacob Cansino
  - Isaac ben Chayyim Cansino
  - Abraham ben Jacob Cansino
- CJ Cansino, a Filipino basketball player
- The Dancing Cansinos, a family of dancers and actors
  - Antonio Cansino
  - Eduardo Cansino
  - Elisa Cansino
  - Margarita Carmen Cansino, daughter of Eduardo, better known as Rita Hayworth
- Jonathan Cansino, an English bridge player
- Pilar Cansino, a Spanish actress
- Richard Cansino, an American voice actor
- Tinì Cansino, a Greek actress

== Companies ==
- CanSino Biologics, a Chinese vaccine company
