= Rita Hayworth: The Love Goddess =

1983 television film directed by James Goldstone

- Genre: Biography; Drama
- Based on: Rita Hayworth by John Kobal
- Written by: Arthur Kean
- Directed by: James Goldstone
- Starring: Lynda Carter; Michael Lerner; John Considine
- Music by: Lalo Schifrin
- Country of origin: United States
- Original language: English

Production
- Executive producer: David Susskind
- Producers: Andrew Susskind; Stanley Kallis
- Production locations: Burbank, California; Los Angeles
- Cinematography: Terry K. Meade
- Editor: Edward A. Biery
- Running time: 100 minutes
- Production companies: The Susskind Company; Lorimar Television

Original release
- Network: CBS
- Release: November 2, 1983

Rita Hayworth: The Love Goddess is a 1983 American made-for-television biographical film directed by James Goldstone. Based on the 1977 biography Rita Hayworth by John Kobal, it deals with real events in the life of actress Rita Hayworth from 1931 to 1952. It was broadcast by CBS on November 2, 1983.

== Plot ==
Under the direction of an abusive husband and against the wishes of her father, young dancer Rita Cansino rose to the top of Hollywood as Columbia Pictures contract player Rita Hayworth. Her confidence and boldness increased as she rose to become one of the world's leading movie actresses and iconic figures. However, happiness continues to elude her in unhappy marriages, alcoholism, and an intense, spiteful relationship under the studio's leader Harry Cohn.

=== Historical inaccuracies ===
Although based on a biography, several other biographies about Hayworth's life released in subsequent years have expanded the details known of Hayworth's background that were available at the time of the film. In 1989, author Barbara Leaming released the authorized biography If This Was Happiness: A Biography of Rita Hayworth after writing an authorized biography for her second husband Orson Welles. Hayworth's daughter Yasmin Aga Khan, former co-star Glenn Ford and his son Peter, and several others have also spoke of the difficulties Hayworth faced. As a result, several of the film's details have been rendered inaccurate from these revelations.

- The film portrays Hayworth as having a close relationship with her father, even allowing him to move in with her and Welles following her mother's death in 1945. However, Welles told Leaming that Hayworth had confided in him that her father had molested her as a child. He also claimed Hayworth would "fly into these rages, never at me... always at Harry Cohn or her father or her mother or her brother."
- In the film, Hayworth is looking to return to Columbia in 1950, but is under suspension. In reality, Hayworth broke her contract with Columbia upon her marriage to Prince Aly Khan in 1949. She only returned after they sued her during her divorce from Khan in 1951.
- The film does not portray Hayworth's longtime on-and-off affair with frequent co-star Glenn Ford, which was not revealed until Ford's son Peter released his father's biography in 2011. Ford revealed that his father and Hayworth began an affair during the filming of Gilda in 1945. In 1948, Hayworth traveled to France for an abortion after she became pregnant by Ford.

== Cast ==
- Lynda Carter as Rita Hayworth
- Michael Lerner as Harry Cohn
- John Considine as Ed Judson
- Jane Hallaren as Virginia Van Upp
- Alejandro Rey as Eduardo Cansino
- Aharon Ipalé as Aly Khan
- Edward Edwards as Orson Welles
- Dave Shelley as Vincent Sherman
- Philip Sterling as Joseph Schenck
- Ivan Bonar as Howard Hawks
- Leonard Mann as Contract Player
- James T. Callahan as Test Director
- Julian Fellowes as Aly Khan's Chauffeur
- Ron Frazier as Freddie Rice
- Rance Howard as Still Photographer
- Margaret Fairchild as Volga Hayworth
- Lindsey Ginter as John Rayborn
- Terri Lynn as Kim Novak

== See also ==
- List of American films of 1983
