= Richard Cansino =

American voice actor (born 1953)

- Born: Richard Elias Cansino; August 10, 1953 (age 73); Los Angeles, California, US
- Other names: Damon Phillips, Edward Villa, Edward Zilla, Frank Dallas, Jack Lehman, Jason Bigley, Phil Meyers, Ralph Gibson, Richard Hayworth, Steve Davis, Todd Hodges, Tony Williams, Vincent Hatcher
- Occupation: Actor
- Years active: 1979–present
- Relatives: Antonio Cansino (great-grandfather); Eduardo Cansino Sr. (grandfather); Volga Hayworth (grandmother); Elisa Cansino (great-aunt); Rita Hayworth (aunt); Vernon Cansino (uncle); Yasmin Aga Khan (cousin); Gonzalo García (third nephew)

Richard Elias Cansino (born August 10, 1953) is an American voice actor. He is also known as Richard Hayworth because he is the nephew of Rita Hayworth. Cansino is best known for his voice work as Kenshin Himura in the anime adaptation of Rurouni Kenshin.

Additionally, Cansino is also known for his performances as Izumo Kamizuki from the Naruto series and Legato Bluesummers from Trigun.

== Filmography ==
=== Film ===
- Phoenix Forgotten - Captain Groves
- Day of the Warrior - J.P
- Fit to Kill - Kenevil
- Hard Hunted - Coyote
- Do or Die - Hebert
- Guns - Tito

=== Television ===
- Hannah Montana - Pierre (Ep. Wish You Wish You Were a Star)
- Ned's Declassified School Survival Guide - Mr. Phorchin (Ep. Hallways & Friends Moving)
- Scrubs - Dr. Rose (Ep. My Nightingale)
- Star Trek: The Next Generation - Deja Q - Dr. Garin

=== Anime ===
- 8 Man After - Ichiro
- Argento Soma - Mr. X
- Bastard!! - Kall-Su
- Blade - Augus
- Bleach - Daiji Hirasago (The Bull of Kusajishi), Additional Voices
- Bobobo-bo Bo-bobo - King Nosehair, Additional voices
- Crayon Shin-chan (Phuuz dub) - Bo
- Cyborg 009 - Jean-Paul, Apollo
- Digimon - Pixiemon (Adventure), Guardromon (Tamers), Arbormon (Frontier)
- Eagle Riders - Hunter Harris
- Flint the Time Detective - Dr. Bernard Goodman, Thud of the Cardians, Raldo
- Gatchaman (1994) - Joe
- Ghost in the Shell: Stand Alone Complex - Additional Voices
- Initial D - Kyoichi Sudo (Tokyopop dub)
- Haré+Guu - Gupta
- Heat Guy J - Boma
- Kekkaishi - Hekian, Sanan
- Kikaider - Gill's Assistant
- Kyo Kara Maoh! - Geigen Huber
- Lily C.A.T. - Walt
- Lupin the Third - Additional Voices
- Mirage of Blaze - Takaya Ohgi
- Mobile Suit Gundam (movie trilogy) - Hayato Kobayashi
- Monster - Detective Janáček, Dr. Norden
- Naruto - Izumo Kamizuki, Misumi Tsurugi, Additional voices
- Naruto: Shippuden - Izumo Kamizuki, Sadai (Ep. 196)
- Nightwalker: The Midnight Detective - Tatsuhiko Shido
- Noein - Kuina
- Overman King Gainer - Zakki Bronco
- Paranoia Agent - Oda (Ep. 10)
- Pilot Candidate - Azuma Hijikata
- Rurouni Kenshin - Kenshin Himura
- Saint Tail - Detective Asuka
- Saiyuki Gunlock - Zakuro
- Scryed - Emergy Maxfell
- Space Pirate Captain Herlock: The Endless Odyssey - Tadashi Daiba
- Stellvia - Pierre Takida
- Street Fighter II: The Animated Movie - Vega
- Street Fighter II V - Vega (Animaze Dub)
- Street Fighter Alpha Generations - Ryu
- Tenchi Muyo! - Seiryo Tennan (OVA 2, Toonami Version)
- Tenchi in Tokyo - Tsugaru
- Tenchi Muyo in Love 2 - Yosho
- Tenjho Tenge - Kagesada Sugano
- The Dog of Flanders - Adult Paul
- The Prince of Tennis - Takashi Kawamura
- The Twelve Kingdoms - Aozaru
- The Cockpit - Lt. Rheindars
- Trigun - Legato Bluesummers
- Tweeny Witches - Sigma
- Vampire Princess Miyu - Koichi (ep.3)
- Witch Hunter Robin - Yutaka Kobari
- WXIII: Patlabor the Movie 3 - Asuma Shinohara
- X - Daisuke Saiki
- Zatch Bell! - Lance

=== Live action voiceovers ===
- Bleach - Renji Abarai
- Cromartie High - The Movie - Takashi Kamiyama
- Mighty Morphin Power Rangers - King Sphinx, Eye Guy, Weaveworm, Cardiatron, Jellyfish Warrior (uncredited)
- The Neighbor No. 13 - God of Death
- Power Rangers: Turbo - Clockster (uncredited)
- Power Rangers: In Space - Behemoth (uncredited)
- Power Rangers: Lost Galaxy - Kegler
- Power Rangers: Lightspeed Rescue - Cobra Monster
- Power Rangers: Time Force - Ironspike
- Power Rangers: Wild Force - Jindrax (first 4 episodes)
- Onmyoji - Fujiwara no Morosuke

=== Movie roles ===
- Bleach: Fade to Black - Shizuku
- Dawn of the Dead - ADR group
- Digimon: Battle of Adventurers - Labramon
- Do or Die - Herbert
- Fit to Kill - Kenevil
- Ghost in the Shell 2: Innocence - Wakabayashi
- Hard Hunted - Coyote
- Sakura Wars: The Movie - Patrick Hamilton

=== Video game roles ===
- Assassin's Creed - Majd Addin, Peasant
- Dirge of Cerberus: Final Fantasy VII - Incidental characters
- Dishonored 2 - Aramis Stilton
- Dynasty Warriors 4 Pang Tong
- Dynasty Warriors 5 Pang Tong, Sima Yi
- Dynasty Warriors 6 Pang Tong
- Dynasty Warriors 7 Pang Tong
- Dynasty Warriors 8 Pang Tong
- Dynasty Warriors Next Pang Tong
- Dynasty Warriors Strike Force Pang Tong
- Fallout 4 - Ricky Dalton, Solomon, Lorenzo Cabot
- Naruto: Ultimate Ninja - Jiraiya, Izumo Kamizuki, Zaku Abumi
- Red Dead Redemption 2 - The Local Pedestrian Population
- Resident Evil: The Darkside Chronicles - Alfred Ashford
- Shadow Hearts: Covenant - Kurando, Blanca, Lenny
- Silent Bomber - Benoit Manderubrot (as Richard Hayworth)
- The Bard's Tale - Additional voices
- The Bouncer - Dauragon C. Mikado (as Richard Hayworth)
- Warriors Orochi Pang Tong, Sima Yi
- Warriors Orochi 2 Pang Tong, Sima Yi
