= Yasmin Aga Khan =

Swiss-born philanthropist (born 1949)

Her Highness Princess Yasmin Aga Khan
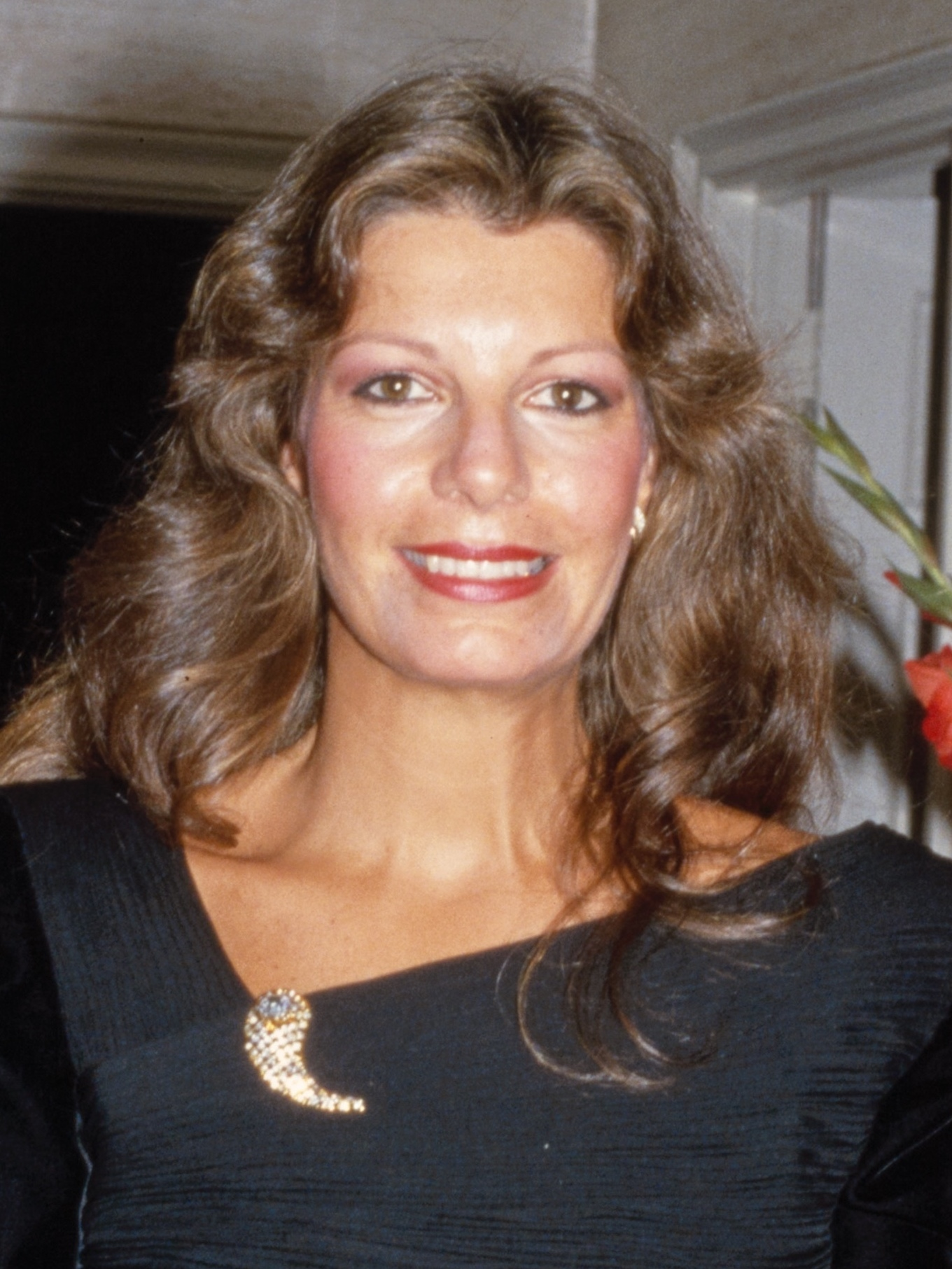
- Yasmin Aga Khan in 1984
- Born: December 28, 1949 (age 76); Lausanne, Switzerland
- Education: Bennington College
- Spouses: Basil Embiricos (m. 1985; div. 1987) Christopher M. Jeffries (m. 1989; div. 1993)
- Children: 1
- Parents: Aly Khan (father); Rita Hayworth (mother)
- Family: Karim Aga Khan IV (half-brother); Amyn Aga Khan (half-brother); Eduardo Cansino (grandfather); Volga Hayworth (grandmother); Antonio Cansino (great-grandfather); Elisa Cansino (greataunt); Vinton Hayworth (greatuncle); Richard Cansino (cousin); Gonzalo García (third nephew)

Princess Yasmin Aga Khan (born December 28, 1949) is an American philanthropist known for raising public awareness of Alzheimer's disease. She is the younger daughter of American movie actress and dancer Rita Hayworth and Aly Khan. Her paternal half-brother was Karim al-Husayni, Aga Khan IV.

== Early life ==
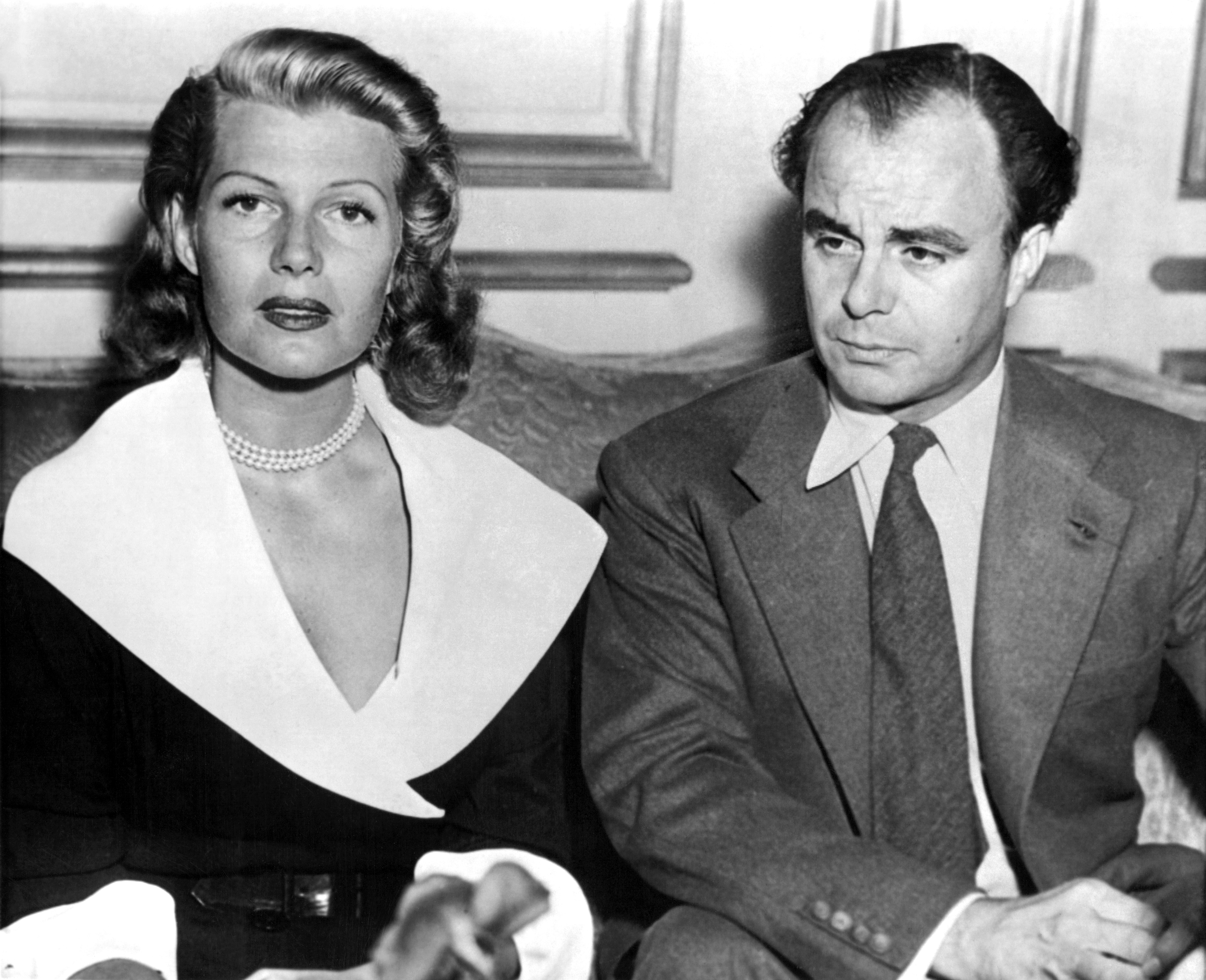
Khan's parents, Rita Hayworth and Aly Khan in 1952

Khan was born at Clinique de Montchoisi in Lausanne, Switzerland; she spent her early life with her mother and her maternal half-sister, Rebecca Welles Manning, daughter of Hayworth's marriage to Orson Welles. Her half-brothers are Karim Aga Khan IV and Amyn Aga Khan. In January 1953, her parents' divorce was granted on the grounds of extreme mental cruelty. Khan, then only three years old, played about the court while the case was being heard, finally climbing on to the judge's lap.

She attended Buxton School, a small boarding school in Williamstown, Massachusetts, and the International School of Geneva. In 1973, she graduated from Bennington College in the United States and was interested in opera singing.

== Philanthropic activities ==
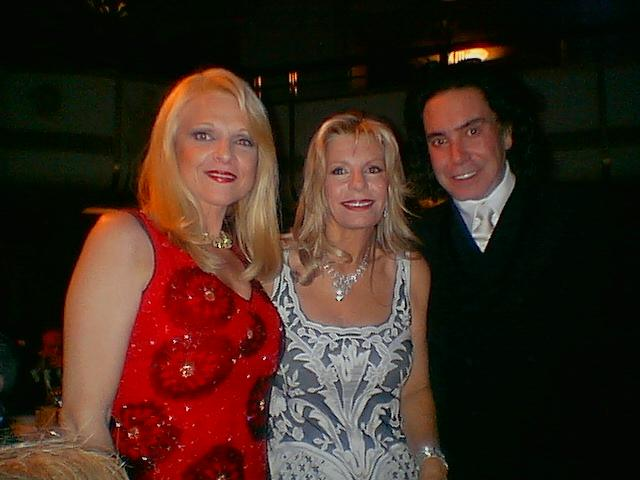
Khan (center), Margo Catsimatidis (wife of John Catsimatidis), and Rodolfo Valentin at the 2006 Alzheimer's Association Rita Hayworth Gala

Influenced by the death of her mother, for whom she cared for many years, from Alzheimer's disease, Khan serves on the board of directors, as vice chairman, of Alzheimer's and Related Disorders Association. She is also the president of Alzheimer's Disease International, a National Council Member of the Salk Institute, and a spokesperson for the Boston University School of Medicine, Board of Visitors. She also serves on numerous boards of the Aga Khan Foundation. The 2009 documentary I Remember Better When I Paint features a stirring interview with Khan describing how her mother took up painting while struggling with Alzheimer's and produced beautiful works of art.

== Personal life ==
She married her first husband, Greek economist and shipping heir Basil Embiricos, in 1985, divorcing him in 1987. The couple had a son who died in 2011 at the age of 25. She married her second husband, Christopher M. Jeffries, in 1989, divorcing him in 1993.
