= Jacob ben Aaron Sasportas =

Rabbi and anti-Sabbatean (1610–1698)

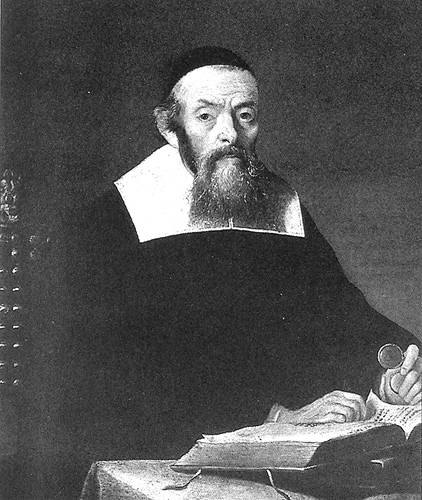
- Jacob Sasportas (1671)

Personal life
- Born: 1610 Oran, Spanish Oran
- Died: April 15, 1698 (aged 87–88) Amsterdam, Netherlands

Religious life
- Religion: Judaism

Jacob ben Aaron Sasportas (1610 – April 15, 1698) was an Algerian-born rabbi, kabbalist, diplomat and author. He served as the rabbi of various Jewish communities in North Africa and later in Western Sephardic communities across Europe, including London and Amsterdam. He is perhaps best known for his vocal opposition to the messianic claims of Sabbatai Zevi.

== Biography ==
Sasportas was born in Oran, Algeria, then under Spanish rule, to a distinguished family of scholars and diplomats. A child prodigy, he joined the Tlemcen rabbinical court at eighteen. He became the rabbi of Tlemcen at twenty-four, and later held the same position in Marrakesh, Fes, and Salé. Around 1646, he was imprisoned by the Moorish king but managed to escape with his family to Amsterdam around 1653. He stayed there till the disorders in Africa ceased, when he was called back by the King of Morocco and sent on a special mission to the Spanish court (ca. 1659) to ask for aid against the rebels. On his return he was invited to the rabbinate of the Portuguese community of London (1664). According to David Franco Mendes (in Ha-Meassef, 1788, p. 169), Jacob had accompanied Menasseh ben Israel to London in 1655. Owing to the outbreak of the plague in London in 1665, Jacob went to Hamburg, where he officiated as rabbi till 1673. In that year he was called to Amsterdam and appointed head of the yeshiva Keter Torah, founded by the brothers Pinto. Two years later he became dayyan and head of the yeshiva at Livorno, and in 1680 he returned to Amsterdam, where he was appointed head of the yeshiva 'Eitz Hayyim. After the death of Isaac Aboab da Fonseca (1693) he was appointed rabbi of the Portuguese community, which office he held till his death at Amsterdam.

Grätz ("Gesch." x., note 2) identifies Jacob Sasportas with Jaho Saportas, who competed with the Cansinos for the office of interpreter at the Spanish court (Jacob Cansino's preface to Moses Almosnino's "Extremos y Grandezas de Constantinople," Madrid, 1638).

== Works ==
- Toledot Ya'akov (Amsterdam, 1652), an index of Biblical passages found in the haggadah of the Jerusalem Talmud, similar to Aaron Pesaro's "Toledot Aharon," which relates to the Babylonian Talmud only;
- Ohel Ya'akov (ib. 1737), responsa, edited and prefaced by his son Abraham Sasportas;
- Tzitzat Novel Zvi (ib. 1737), polemical correspondence against Sabbatai Zevi and his followers, also edited by his son. The last-named work was afterward abridged and published under the title "Kitzur Tzitzat Novel Zvi" (Altona, n.d.).

Jacob edited the "Hekal ha-Kodesh" of Moses ben Maimon Elbaz, to which he added an introduction and supplied notes (Amsterdam, 1653).

== Bibliography ==
- Samuel Joseph Fuenn, Keneset Yisrael, p. 577;
- Julius Fürst, Bibl. Jud. iii.251;
- Heinrich Graetz, Gesch. 3d ed., x.204, 215, 217, 225-226, note 2;
- Meyer Kayserling, Bibl. Esp.-Port.-Jud. pp. 4, 8, 98-99;
- S. Rubin, in Magyar Zsidá Szemle, vii.711;
- Abraham Sasportas, preface to Ohel Ya'aḳob;
- Moritz Steinschneider, Cat. Bodl. col. 1254;
- S. Wiener, in Ha-Meliẓ, 1894, Nos. 203, 245;
- Cat. Anglo-Jew. Hist. Exh. p. 48;
- Johann Christoph Wolf, Bibliotheca Hebræa i.619.
- Yaacob Dweck. Dissident Rabbi: The Life of Jacob Sasportas (Princeton University Press, 2019)
