= The Dancing Cansinos =

Group of dancers and actors

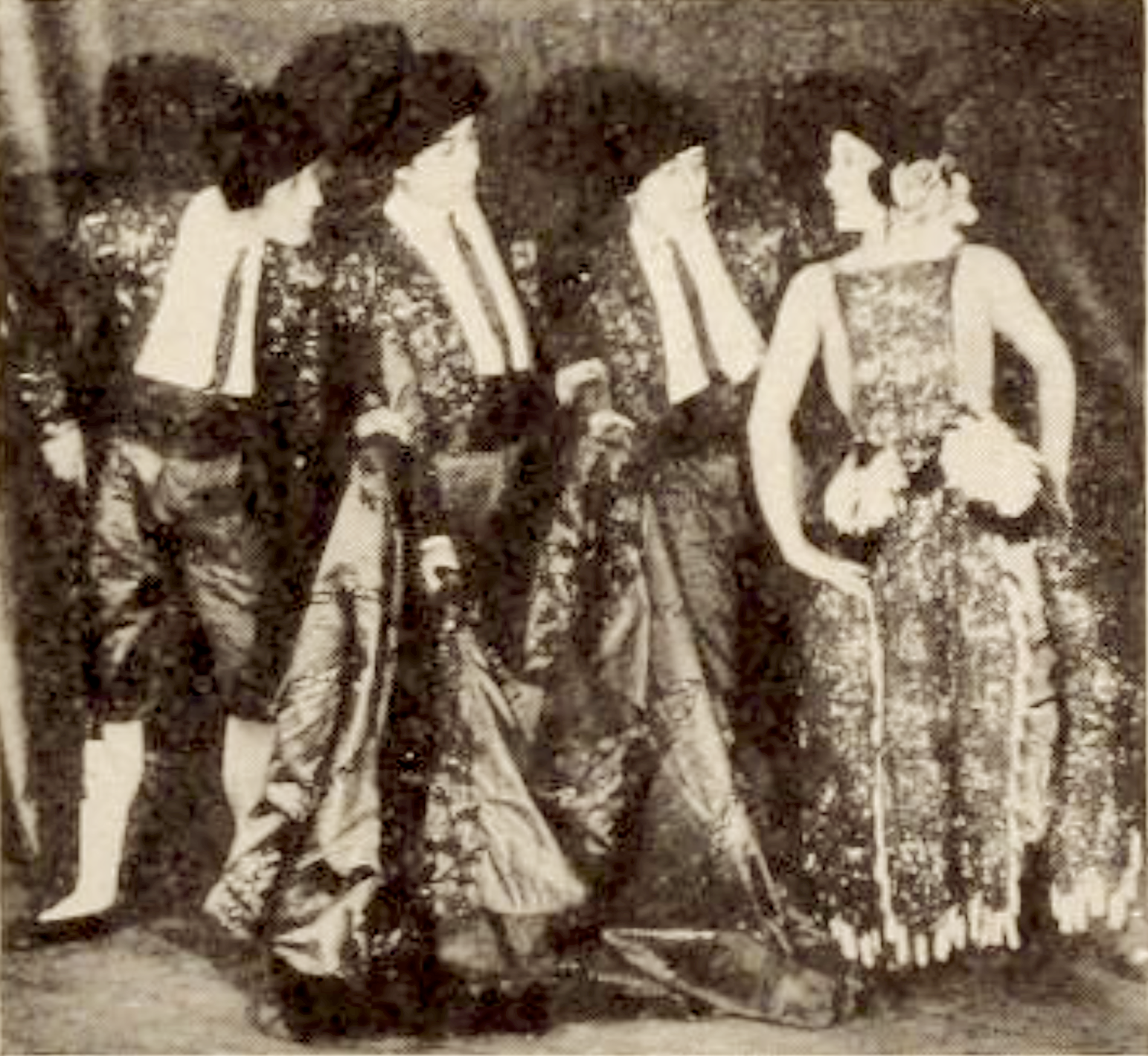
1923 photograph of The Cansinos

The Dancing Cansinos were a family of dancers and actors including American actress Rita Hayworth, and Spanish dancer Antonio Cansino. The family performed and toured extensively in New York City and Spain.

The elder generation of the Dancing Cansinos were Antonio and Carmen Cansino. Antonio fused traditional Romani and classical Spanish dance to create modern-day Spanish dance.

The couple had seven children who were all dancers: Eduardo, Jose, Angel, Paco, Antonio Jr., Rafael and Elisa Cansino.

Around 1910, Eduard Cansino and Elisa Cansino performed in Vaudeville theaters on the B. F. Keith Circuit.

While performing in and around New York City, The Dancing Cansinos included Eduardo Cansino, Sr. (March 2, 1895 – December 24, 1968), his wife, Volga Hayworth (August 8, 1897 – January 25, 1945), daughter Rita Hayworth (October 17, 1918 – May 14, 1987), and son, Eduardo, Jr. (October 13, 1919 – March 11, 1974).
