= Castilleja de la Cuesta =

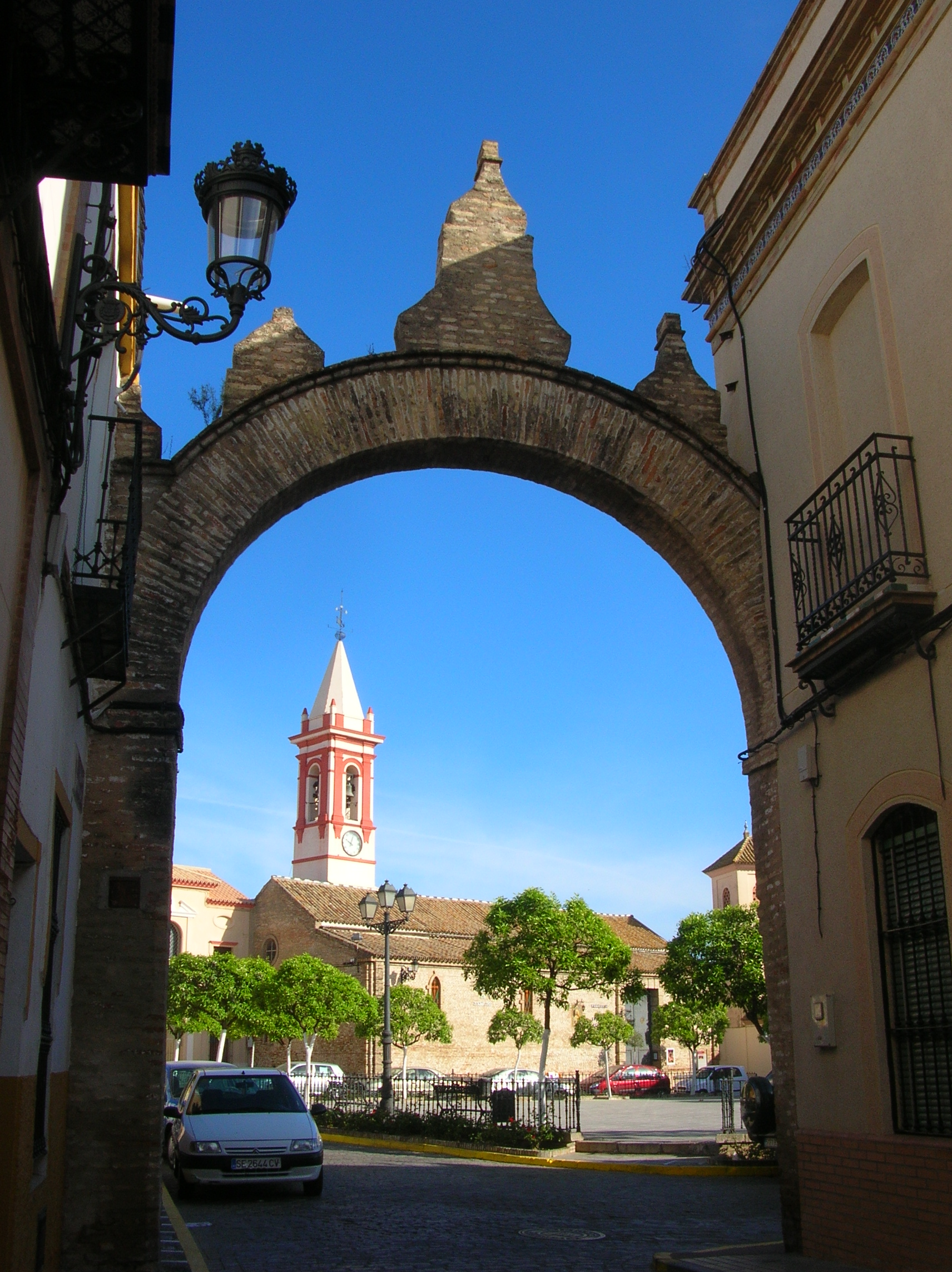
- Image of Castilleja de la Cuesta

- Flag Seal

- Location in Spain and in Andalusia. Castilleja de la Cuesta (Andalusia)
- Coordinates: 37°23′N 6°03′W
- Country: Spain
- Autonomous community: Andalusia
- Province: Seville

Government
  - Mayor: María Carmen Herrera Coronil (PSOE)

Area
  - Total: 2.17 km^{2} (0.84 sq mi)
- Elevation: 96 m (315 ft)

Population (2023)
  - Total: 17,167
  - Density: 7,910/km^{2} (20,500/sq mi)
- Time zone: UTC+1 (CET)
  - Summer (DST): UTC+2 (CEST)
- Website: www.castillejadelacuesta.es

Castilleja de la Cuesta is a town and municipality in the province of Seville, in the autonomous community of Andalusia, Spain.

Castilleja de la Cuesta has a local specialty, the "torta de aceite". This is a thin, crisp baked good made with olive oil and a hint of anise. They are eaten throughout Spain and exported to many countries.

== Notable people ==
- Hernán Cortés — Died here on December 2, 1547. His body is interned in the Templo de Jesús of the Hospital de Jesús Nazareno in Mexico City.
- Eduardo Cansino Sr. — Born here, father of actress Rita Hayworth.
- Miguel Ángel Llera — Born here, footballer and football manager who played for Scunthorpe United.
- Pepe Luis Vázquez Garcés — Died here on 19 May 2013, bullfighter and later bull breeder.

== See also ==
- List of municipalities in Seville
