= Jacob Cansino =

Jewish writer (died 1666)

- Died: 19 September 1666
- Occupations: Royal Interpreter, Translator, Man of letters
- Known for: The fifth in succession of the Cansino family to hold the office of royal interpreter for the Spanish Crown in Oran.
- Notable work: Extremas y Grandenzas de Constantinopla (1638 translation of a Hebrew work by Moses Almosnino)
- Title: "Vassal of his Catholic Majesty and interpreter of languages in the places of Oran"

Jacob Cansino (Cancino) (died 19 September 1666) was "Vassal of his Catholic Majesty and interpreter of languages in the places of Oran" (as he styled himself). (Oran was a Spanish possession at the time, with the right of residency for Jews). Cansino was the fifth in succession of the Cansino family to hold the office of royal interpreter. Upon the death of his brother Aaron in 1633, the office was given by King Philip IV of Spain to Yahob Caportas (whom Graetz identifies with Jacob Sasportas), a member of an influential Jewish family that rivaled the Cansinos. Thereupon Jacob Cansino came to Madrid, petitioned the king for the office in consideration of the services rendered by his family to the government, and obtained the appointment in 1636, with a salary of 25 scudi per month.

As a man of letters Jacob Cansino is known for his translation into Castilian of a Hebrew book by Moses Almosnino, under the title Extremas y Grandenzas de Constantinopla, published at Madrid by Francisco Martinez, 1638. The preface includes an extract from the book of the royal secretary, Augustus Maldonatus, enumerating the various offices held by members of the Cansino family, and a letter from King Philip IV in appreciation of their services.

Cansino made other trips to Madrid. By 1623, he had secured permission to live as a Jew in Madrid, under the protection of the Count-Duke of Olivares, and with access to the royal palace. He dedicated a book to Olivares. With the fall of the Count from favor in 1646, Cansino was imprisoned, but later released. In 1656, he loaned the Crown 800,000 ducats.

In a letter of 19 November 1643, Fray Juan Ponce, a former Holy Office commissioner in Oran, warned the Suprema of the Inquisition of the pending arrival of several Jews from Oran. One of these was Jacob Cansino. Ponce described him as a "powerful magician" who could mix herbs and powders that subjugated others to his will even if they had only the slightest contact with him. Ponce claimed that Cansino was bringing his potions with him, as well as some anti-Catholic propaganda. The Suprema ordered the Valencia council to expel any of these Jewish travelers who landed without specific royal permission.

Jacob Cansino excited the enmity of the Marquis de Los Veles, governor of Oran, who wished to give the office he held to the husband of one of his favorites. Jacob was too firmly established in his position, however, and remained in office until his death in 1666. In 1668, the Jews were expelled from Oran at the instigation of the governor.

== See also ==
- Cansino family
