= Cansino family =

Sephardic Jewish family originally from Algeria

Cansino
- Current region: Kingdom of Spain
- Earlier spellings: Cancino
- Etymology: Derives from
- Origin: Oran, Algeria
- Founded: 17th century

The Cansino family is a prominent Sephardic Jewish family originally from Oran, Algeria.

The family progenitor Jacob Cansino (d.1666) served as an interpreter at Oran, a Spanish colony in northwestern Africa, under Charles V, until 1556, when he was sent as an ambassador to the king of Morocco. The office was then held in regular succession by his son Isaac Cansino from 1568 to 1599, by his grandson Hayyim Cansino from 1601 to 1621, and by his great-grandson Aaron Cansino from 1621 to 1633. Other prominent members of the family were Isaac ben Chayyim Cansino, poet; Grey Cansino Held, poet and artist, and Rabbi Abraham Cansino II, secretary of the Jewish community of Oran.
