= Rodolfo Valentin =

Argentine-American model and hairdresser

- Valentin at work in 2002
- Born: June 22, 1944 (age 82); Buenos Aires, Argentina
- Occupation: Hairdresser
- Years active: 1972—present
- Employer: Rodolfo Valentin

Rodolfo Valentin (born June 22, 1944) is a New York City hairdresser and entrepreneur. Beginning his career as a fashion model in Buenos Aires, Argentina, Valentin later emigrated to New York and opened an elegant salon in Madison Avenue. Now he owns three hair salons within the New York City area with products and services that include hair extension and hair coloring.

Valentin founded the charity organization Sofia's Hair 4 Health Foundation.

== Early life and career ==
Valentin was born in Buenos Aires, Argentina. The son of Spanish and Italian parents, from an early age he had dreams of becoming a plastic surgeon when he grew up. However, Valentin became more interested in his future profession after years of playing the hairdresser to his mother and sister. His aunt, who had studied at a local beauty school in Buenos Aires, would later teach Valentin some of the techniques she had learned. He initially worked as a fashion model.

Moving to Europe, Valentin assisted hair stylist Alexandre de Paris in Spain and Italy. It was around this time that Valentin found a liking for the Five Towns area of Long Island, New York, later claiming "Five Towns is my Beverly Hills". He purchased a mansion in Hewlett Bay Park with his partner in life and business Jorge Perez, and he remained in the area for eighteen years.

Two years after immigrating to Long Island in 1984, Valentin opened Rodolfo Valentin's salon and spa to the general public. Since then he has opened two further salons in the New York area.

Valentin's patented method of hair extension, the "Hair Infusion", was featured in the book Forget the Facelift by dermatologist Doris J. Day.

== Philanthropy ==
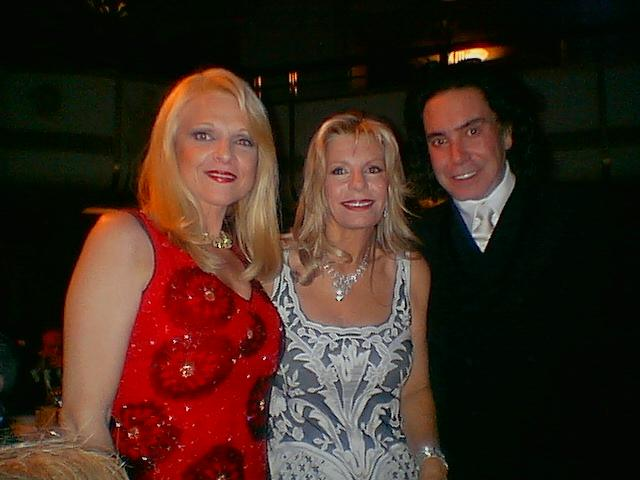
Margo Catsimatidis, Yasmin Aga Khan and Rodolfo Valentin at an Alzheimer's Association Rita Hayworth Gala

When he was a child Valentin had decided to help those suffering from hair loss due to chemotherapy treatment. His desire to do so arose after seeing the depression his mother (who later died from breast cancer) suffered from after losing her hair. "I promised my mother that I would help everyone with this, and make the perfect piece for chemo patients", he said.

To accomplish this, in 2002 Valentin founded the Sofia's Hair 4 Health foundation which offers free hair pieces for those undergoing chemotherapy treatment. To qualify the person must earn fewer than thirty thousand dollars per year. "Some ladies don't make enough money", he said. "If they make $20,000, they don't make enough money to pay for the prosthesis."

Between one and three people are chosen every month by the organization. Nominations can originate from the person's own application, his or her friends, family members or medical caretakers. Applicants must also currently be under treatment and suffering hair loss due to treatments.

Valentin has donated to the American Foundation for Suicide Prevention, Alzheimer's Association and the Hellenic Times Scholarship Foundation. On October 27, 2011, Valentin donated 1,000 hair prosthesis to the "Hewlett House 1 in 9". The organization name derivates from the fact that 1 in 9 people living in Long Island are diagnosed with breast cancer. On October 23, 2012, Rodolfo Valentin was named "New Yorker of the Week" by New York Television Channel 1.
