= Isaac ben Chayyim Cansino =

Isaac ben Chayyim Cansino (died 1672) was a poet and prominent member of the Jewish community of Oran, Algeria. He was probably a brother of Jacob Cansino II. Cansino was a liturgical poet of high attainments, and cantor in the synagogue on the Day of Atonement, an office regarded as a post of honor. Cansino's greatest work is the first part of the so-called Machzor Oran, which contains many poems written by him. Among his occasional poems is one in praise of the collection of poems Aguddat Ezob by Abraham ben Jacob Cansino; a dirge on the death of Aaron Cansino in 1633; and one of sympathy to Samuel Cansino on the occasion of the loss of his fortune by the cheating of gamblers.

Wolf speaks of Isaac Cansino, a brother of Abraham Cansino, who embraced Christianity after the expulsion of the Jews from Oran in 1668. This Isaac Cansino, however, can hardly be identical with the one above mentioned. Meyer Kayserling also mentions an Isaac Cansino, publisher at Amsterdam in 1685, whose relationship with the Cansinos of Oran is unknown.

== See also ==
- Cansino family
