= Barbara Leaming =

American biographer

Barbara Leaming is an American biographer, whose subjects have included Roman Polanski, Orson Welles, Rita Hayworth, Marilyn Monroe, John F. Kennedy, Winston Churchill, and Jacqueline Kennedy Onassis.

== Career ==
Leaming, born in Philadelphia, Pennsylvania, on May 22, 1943, graduated from Haddonfield Memorial High School in Haddonfield, NJ, in June 1961, and earned her B.A. degree from Smith College in 1965 and her Ph.D. from New York University in 1976. She wrote her doctoral dissertation, Engineers of Human Souls, on the transition to socialist realism in the Soviet cinema of the 1930s.

She was a long time professor in the Department of Theatre and Film at Hunter College in New York City until she left to devote herself to writing full-time. Her articles have appeared in Vanity Fair, and The New York Times Magazine.

Leaming won the Emery Reves Award of the International Churchill Society for her book Churchill Defiant: 1945-1955. She also was awarded the Prix Litteraire 2000 by the Syndicat français de la critique de cinéma for her biography of Marilyn Monroe which was published by Albin Michel in France under the title Marilyn, une femme.

In 1985, Leaming's authorized biography of Orson Welles was described by Anna Quindlen, writing in The New York Times Book Review, as "a biography that splendidly evokes a good deal of the man, his work and his time." Kirkus Reviews saw it as "a distinguished gift to American arts and letters." The Los Angeles Times called Leaming's 1992 biography of Bette Davis "a strong, poignant biography that has truth-telling power." Leaming's 1995 biography of Katharine Hepburn was said by Entertainment Weekly to tell the actress's story "with an empathy and acuity desperately rare in biographies of film stars." In 1998, Leaming published her biography of Marilyn Monroe which Molly Haskell, writing in The New York Times Book Review, said "restores Marilyn's humanity, gives flesh-and-blood, intelligence and initiative, to the archetypal dumb blonde."

In 2006 Leaming turned from the film world to the world of politics and history with her biography Jack Kennedy: The Education of a Statesman. Christopher Hitchens declared in The Atlantic Monthly: "The great merit of Barbara Leaming's new book is to demonstrate how dependent the young Kennedy became upon a charmed circle of British noblemen, and also how obsessed he became with the need to match himself with that greatest of Anglo-American aristocrats, Winston Churchill." In the London Sunday Telegraph, Christopher Silvester wrote of Leaming's JFK book, "No previous biographer has focused so sharply on Kennedy's attempts to apply Churchillian thought during his years in the White House."

Leaming next told the story of Winston Churchill's last ten years of public life in her book Churchill Defiant. Writing in Finest Hour: The Journal of Winston Churchill, Richard M. Langworth said, "Leaming's insight is extraordinary." Leaming's Jacqueline Bouvier Kennedy Onassis: The Untold Story appeared in 2014. The Boston Globe review commented that the book, "provides suggestive evidence that her subject suffered from the clinical symptoms of post traumatic stress disorder, or PTSD." Leaming reconstructed the life of John F. Kennedy's sister Kathleen in her 2016 biography of Kick Kennedy, a book described by The Wall Street Journal as "strikingly original."

Summarizing Leaming's career as a biographer, the Canadian magazine Maclean's wrote in 2014 that "Leaming has built a formidable reputation for shaping biographies of outsized figures" that are "masterfully rendered and enticing."

== Life ==
She lives in Connecticut.

== Bibliography ==
- Leaming, Barbara (1980). Grigori Kozintsev. New York: Twayne Publishers.
- Leaming, Barbara (1982). Polanski: A Biography: The Filmmaker as Voyeur. New York: Simon & Schuster.
- Leaming, Barbara (1985). Orson Welles: A Biography. New York: Viking. (See Merv Griffin Interview, 1985.)
- Leaming, Barbara (1989). If This Was Happiness: A Biography of Rita Hayworth. New York: Viking.
- Leaming, Barbara (1992). Bette Davis: A Biography. New York: Summit.
- Leaming, Barbara (1995). Katharine Hepburn. New York: Crown.
- Leaming, Barbara (1998). Marilyn Monroe. New York: Crown.
- Leaming, Barbara (2001). Mrs. Kennedy: The Missing History of the Kennedy Years. New York: Free Press.
- Leaming, Barbara (2006). Jack Kennedy: The Education of a Statesman. New York: Norton.
- Leaming, Barbara (2010). Churchill Defiant: Fighting On: 1945-1955. New York: Harper.
- Leaming, Barbara (2014). Jacqueline Bouvier Kennedy Onassis: The Untold Story. New York: Thomas Dunne Books.
- Leaming, Barbara (2016). Kick Kennedy: The Charmed Life and Tragic Death of the Favorite Kennedy Daughter. New York: Thomas Dunne Books.
