= Volga Hayworth =

American dancer and vaudevillian

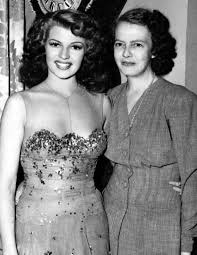
- Hayworth (right) with her daughter Margarita (left) in 1942
- Born: Volga Margaret Hayworth; August 8, 1897; Washington, D.C., U.S.
- Died: January 25, 1945 (aged 47); Santa Monica, California, U.S.
- Other name: Volga H. de Cansino
- Occupation: Actress
- Spouse: Eduardo Cansino, Sr. (m. 1917)
- Children: 3, including Rita Hayworth and Vernon Cansino
- Relatives: Vinton Hayworth (brother)

Volga Margaret Hayworth (Note: Although some sources cite Volga Cansino's maiden name as Haworth, the Haworth Association genealogy site includes an excerpt from the 1900 Census for Washington City, District of Columbia which clearly shows the surname as Hayworth. The genealogy site, which provides her date of birth, indicates that Volga Hayworth's great-grandfather had begun using the name "Hayworth" and her father was legally known by the amended surname (Haworth to Hayworth).) (August 8, 1897 – January 25, 1945) was an American dancer and vaudevillian. A popular showgirl on Broadway, she was the mother of actress Rita Hayworth, who used her mother's maiden name as her professional surname.

== Biography ==
Volga Hayworth was born on August 8, 1897, in Washington, D.C., the daughter of Allynn Duran Hayworth and Margaret O'Hare. Her mother immigrated to the United States from Ireland, and her younger brother was actor Vinton Hayworth. She studied music and dance as child with William J. Oates. In 1910 she began performing in vaudeville at Chase's Theater in Washington D.C. as a member of Miss Cora B. Shreve's juvenile performers in the show The Follies of the Planets. The Washington Post described her as a "bright vivacious little star." At the age of 16 she ran away from home to pursue a career on the stage.

Volga worked as a member of Anna Held's theater troupe; performing in the ensemble of Sigmund Romberg's musical Follow Me at the Casino Theatre in the 1916-1917 Broadway season. After this she worked as a chorus girl in the Ziegfeld Follies, She met her future husband, the Spanish-born dancer Eduardo Cansino, in 1916 when he came to audition for Florence Ziegfeld. They married him in 1917. They had three children. She and her husband formed a vaudeville act, The Dancing Cansinos. This act was also featured in the Broadway revue The Greenwich Village Follies at the Winter Garden Theatre in 1923-1924. She and her husband also operated a dance school in Hollywood, Los Angeles.

Volga Hayworth Cansino died in 1945, at the age of 47, from peritonitis from a ruptured appendix in Santa Monica, California.

== Immediate family ==
- Husband: Eduardo Cansino, born on 2 March 1895 – died on 24 December 1968 (aged 73)
  - Rita Hayworth, born Margarita Carmen Cansino on October 17, 1918 – died on 14 May 1987 (aged 68)
    - Rebecca Welles, born on December 17, 1944 – died on 17 October 2004 (aged 59)
      - Marc McKerrow, born on March 31, 1966 – died on 18 June 2010 (aged 44)
    - Yasmin Aga Khan, born on December 28, 1949
      - Andrew Ali Aga Khan Embiricos, born on December 11, 1985 – died on December 4, 2011 (aged 25)
  - Eduardo Cansino Jr., born on October 13, 1919 – died on March 11, 1974 (aged 54)
    - Richard Cansino, born on August 10, 1953
  - Vernon Cansino, born on May 21, 1922 – died on March 23, 1974 (aged 51)
