= Gonzalo García (footballer, born 2004) =

Spanish footballer (born 2004)

- García playing for Fulham in 2026

Personal information
- Full name: Gonzalo García Torres
- Date of birth: 24 March 2004 (age 22)
- Place of birth: Madrid, Spain
- Height: 1.82 m (6 ft 0 in)
- Position: Forward

Team information
- Current team: Fulham
- Number: 7

Youth career
- 2008–2010: SEK
- 2010–2012: Club Santa Bárbara
- 2012–2014: Jarama Race
- 2014–2018: Real Madrid
- 2018–2019: Mallorca
- 2019–2023: Real Madrid

Senior career*
Years	Team	Apps	(Gls)
2022–2025	Real Madrid B	70	(30)
2023–2026	Real Madrid	35	(6)
2026–	Fulham	11	(1)

International career^{‡}
2021	Spain U18	3	(0)
2023	Spain U19	10	(0)
2025	Spain U21	10	(8)
2026–	Spain	1	(0)
- * Club domestic league appearances and goals as of 21:42, 21 November 2026 (UTC) ‡ National team caps and goals as of 02:25, 7 October 2026 (UTC)

Gonzalo García Torres (born 24 March 2004) is a Spanish professional footballer who plays as a forward for Premier League club Fulham and the Spain national team.

García joined the Real Madrid academy as a youth player, briefly spending time with Mallorca before returning to Madrid. He progressed through the club's youth system and played for Real Madrid Castilla, where he became one of the team's leading goalscorers. García made his first-team debut for Real Madrid and later established himself in the senior squad, notably finishing as the top scorer at the 2025 FIFA Club World Cup. During his time with the first team, he won La Liga before joining Fulham in 2026.

García represented Spain at under-21 level, becoming a regular goalscorer for the side during qualification for the 2027 UEFA European Under-21 Championship. He made his senior debut for Spain in March 2026, appearing as a substitute in a friendly against Iraq.

== Club career ==
=== Early career ===
García is a youth product of SEK, Club Santa Bárbara, and Jarama Race, before joining the youth academy of Real Madrid in 2014. He had a year-long stint with Mallorca's academy in 2018–19 when his family moved there, before returning to Real Madrid. In January 2022, he was promoted to Real Madrid Castilla, and he made his first appearance with them in March 2022. He was a prolific scorer in the División de Honor Juvenil de Fútbol in 2022–23 where he was top scorer and won the domestic U19 treble, which earned him a permanent promotion to the Castilla side.

=== Real Madrid ===
On 29 August 2023, García received his first call-up to the senior side after the starting winger Vinícius Júnior suffered an injury. He was named to the squad list for Real Madrid for the first time for a La Liga match against Getafe on 2 September 2023.

On 5 February 2025, García scored his first goal for Los Blancos in stoppage time in a 3–2 away victory over Leganés in the Copa del Rey quarter-finals. He finished the league season with Castilla as top scorer with 25 goals, including a hat-trick win 5–0 against Intercity and four goals in both the win 6–0 against Mérida and 4–1 away victory against Algeciras. By scoring 25 goals during the 2024–25 season, Gonzalo García equaled the all-time record for most goals in a single campaign for Real Madrid Castilla—a mark previously set by Mariano Díaz.

On 18 June 2025, García scored in a 1–1 draw against Al-Hilal in the group stage match at the FIFA Club World Cup, which was also the club's first goal under new manager Xabi Alonso. He went on to score in a 3–0 victory against Red Bull Salzburg, helping his team advance to the knockout stage. Later, he netted the decisive goal in a 1–0 win over Juventus in the round of 16. García was awarded the top goal scorer of the Club World Cup despite Real Madrid's elimination in the semi-finals, having recorded four goals and one assist in six matches. He was later given a contract renewal until 2030 and promoted to the first team on 8 August 2025. On 4 January 2026, he netted his first La Liga goals by scoring a hat-trick in a 5–1 win over Real Betis.

=== Fulham ===
On 3 August 2026, García signed for Premier League club Fulham on a five-year contract with the Cottagers paying a fixed fee of €40 million (£34.3 million) plus an additional €2 million in performance-related add-ons. Real Madrid would retain an 30% sell-on-clause for any future transfer alongside matching rights, as well as a buy-back clause that would become active from García's second season onwards. The move reunited García with Álvaro Arbeloa, who had previously coached him at Real Madrid. Three weeks later, on 24 August, he scored his first goal on his debut in a 2–3 loss against Chelsea.

== International career ==
García was a youth international for Spain, having played for the Spain U19s at the 2023 UEFA European Under-19 Championship.

In August 2025, he received his first call-up to the Spain U21 for the 2027 UEFA European Under-21 Championship qualification matches against Cyprus and Kosovo, starting in both games.

García received his first senior call-up to the Spain in June 2026. He made his debut on 4 June 2026, coming on in a friendly match against Iraq that ended in a 1–1 draw at the Estadio de Riazor.

== Style of play ==
García is a forward capable of playing across the front line, including as a winger on either flank, a centre-forward, or a second striker. He contributes in open play and in transitional phases. He uses his physical attributes to create space and shield the ball. During the season in which his U19 team won the domestic treble, he was involved in 25% of the team’s goals.

García has been compared to former Real Madrid forward Raúl González due to similarities in their playing style and shared background as La Fábrica graduates. The comparison gained further attention as Raúl coached García during his time at Real Madrid Castilla.

== Personal life ==
García is the second-grandnephew of Spanish-American actress Rita Hayworth, the great-grandnephew of dancers Eduardo Cansino and Elisa Cansino, and the great-great-grandson of dancer Antonio Cansino.

== Career statistics ==
=== Club ===
As of match played 21 November 2026

Appearances and goals by club, season and competition
Club	Season	League			National cup (Note: Includes Copa del Rey)		League cup (Note: Includes EFL Cup)		Europe		Other		Total	
Club	Season	Division	Apps	Goals	Apps	Goals	Apps	Goals	Apps	Goals	Apps	Goals	Apps	Goals
Real Madrid Castilla	2021–22	Primera Federación	2	0	—		—		—		—		2	0
Real Madrid Castilla	2022–23	Primera Federación	5	0	—		—		—		3 (Note: Appearances in Primera Federación play-offs)	0	8	0
Real Madrid Castilla	2023–24	Primera Federación	27	5	—		—		—		—		27	5
Real Madrid Castilla	2024–25	Primera Federación	36	25	—		—		—		—		36	25
Real Madrid Castilla	Total		70	30	—		—		—		3	0	73	30
Real Madrid	2023–24	La Liga	2	0	0	0	—		0	0	0	0	2	0
Real Madrid	2024–25	La Liga	3	0	1	1	—		0	0	6 (Note: Appearances in FIFA Club World Cup)	4	10	5
Real Madrid	2025–26	La Liga	30	6	2	1	—		5 (Note: Appearances in UEFA Champions League)	0	2 (Note: Appearances in Supercopa de España)	1	39	8
Real Madrid	Total		35	6	3	2	—		5	0	8	5	51	13
Fulham	2026–27	Premier League	11	1	0	0	3	1	—		—		14	2
Career total			116	37	3	2	3	1	5	0	11	5	138	45

=== International ===
As of match played 4 June 2026

Appearances and goals by national team and year
National team	Year	Apps	Goals
Spain	2026	1	0
Total		1	0

== Honours ==
Real Madrid

- La Liga: 2023–24
- UEFA Champions League: 2023–24

Individual

- Primera Federación top scorer: 2024–25
- FIFA Club World Cup top scorer: 2025
- FIFA Club World Cup Team of the Tournament: 2025
