= Elisa Cansino =

Spanish dancer (1986–1970)

Elisa Cansino Reina
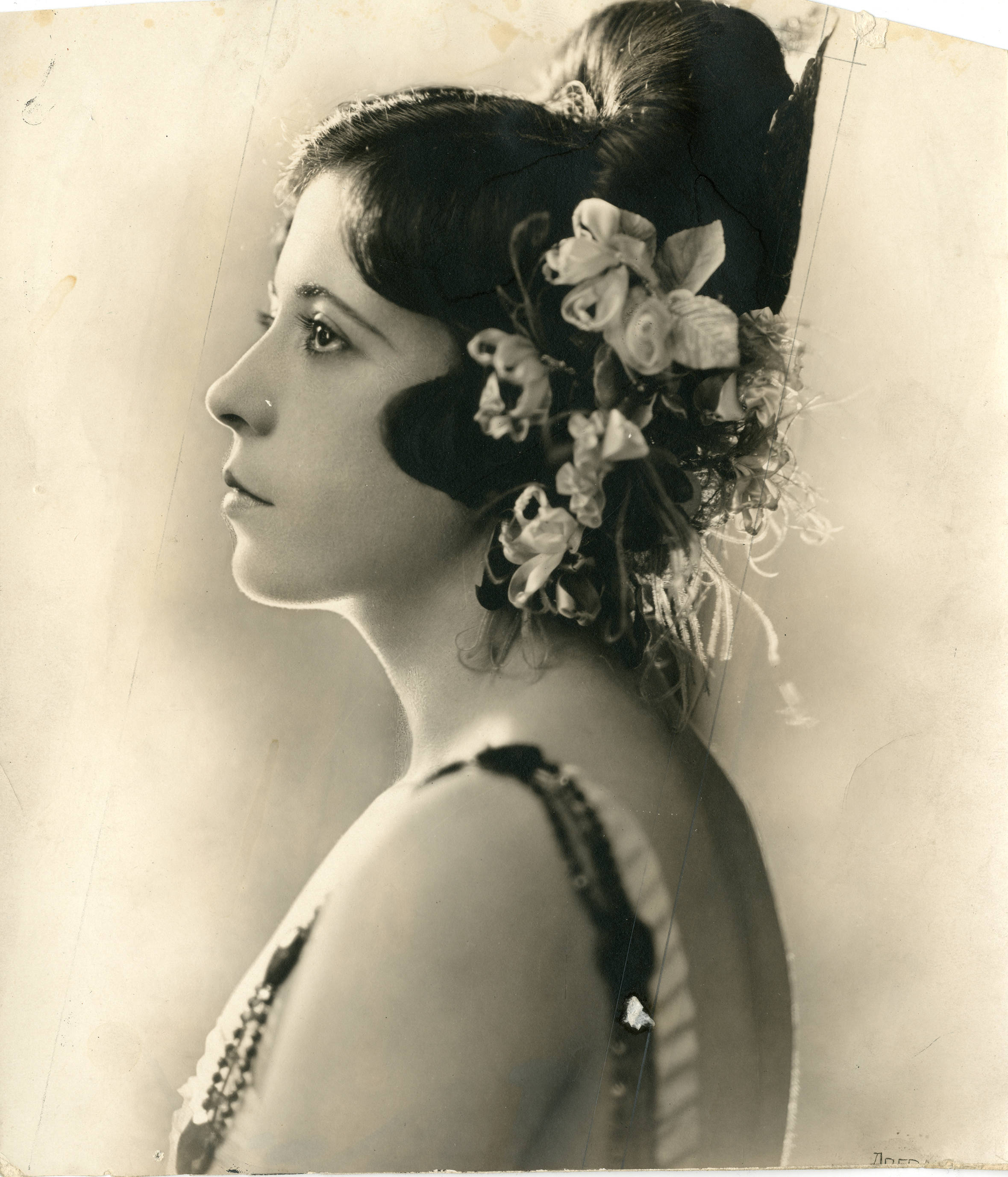
- Cansino c. 1920s
- Born: Maria Cansino; March 23, 1896; Seville, Andalusia, Spain
- Died: January 28, 1970 (aged 73); Uleta, Florida, USA
- Occupation: dancer
- Spouse: Nathaniel Jackolo (m. 1918; div. 1919)
- Children: Gabriel Cansino (Son)
- Parents: Antonio Cansino (father); Carmen Cansino (mother)
- Relatives: Rita Hayworth (niece); Eduardo Cansino (brother); Eduardo Cansino Jr. (nephew); Yasmin Aga Khan (great-niece); Rebecca Welles (grand-niece); Gonzalo García (great-grandnephew)

Elisa Cansino (March 23, 1896 – January 28, 1970) was a vaudeville and Spanish dancer, and one of The Dancing Cansinos. She was the daughter of Antonio Cansino and aunt of Rita Hayworth. Elisa played a major part in bringing Spanish and Romani dances to the United States.

== Early life ==
Elisa was born on March 23, 1896 Seville, Andalusia, Spain.

Her parents were dancers Antonio Cansino and Carmen Reina.

Elisa and Eduardo Cansino toured the B. F. Keith Circuit circa 1910 in the United States. Then, she taught dance in Spain. Later, she danced in New York City with her brothers Eduardo and Angel in The Dancing Cansinos.

She married Nathaniel A. Jackolo and had a son named Gabriel Cansino.

== Death ==
Cansino died on January 28, 1970, in Uleta, Florida at the age of 73.

== Filmography ==
Year	Title	Role	Notes
1926	Hubby's Quiet Little Game	Dancer	uncredited, short film
1926	Masked Mamas	Dancer	uncredited, short film
