= Abraham ben Jacob Cansino =

Spanish-Jewish poet

Abraham ben Jacob Cansino (Cancino) was a seventeenth-century Spanish-Jewish poet. He is the author of Aguddat Ezob (A Bunch of Hyssop), a collection of poems and rhetorical compositions, in three parts, praised very highly by Isaac Cansino and David Abu al-Khair. Abraham Cansino was once arrested by the Spanish authorities for having in his possession copies of the Babylonian and Jerusalem Talmuds. His son was also taken, and both were sent to Murcia, Spain, where they were treated like prisoners for a time, and fined; the copies of the Talmud were confiscated. His friends and relatives wrote poems of consolation to him; to these he replied from Murcia.

There is also an Abraham Cansino, an authority mentioned in the Machzor Oran as writing, in the name of the Jewish community of Oran, to the communities of Algiers in 1661, of Jerusalem in 1663, and of Hebron in 1668. In 1679 he lived in Livorno, Italy, where he received a letter from Tunis. This Abraham Cansino may be identified with Abraham Cansino, rabbi and preacher, brother of Isaac Cansino of whom Wolf speaks (Bibl. Hebr. iii., Nos. 143b, 1101, and 1265c). Meyer Kayserling mentions an Abraham Cansino who was rabbi at Livorno in 1685, and evidently refers to the same person. Luzzatto thinks that this Abraham Cansino is not to be identified with the poet of the same name.

Another Abraham Cansino was an authority mentioned in the Machzor Oran as living at Livorno in 1709. As he is not addressed by the titles usually given to rabbis, Luzzatto thinks that he was not a rabbi, and therefore not to be identified with either of the above. The epitaph of an Abraham Cansino written by Jacob Sasportas is given in the Machzor Oran, but furnishes no indication of the place or date of its writing.

Mention is also made of an Abraham Cansino, author of the epitaph on David Francis, who died about 1696.
