= Moses Almosnino =

Personal life
- Born: c. 1515 Salonica, Ottoman Empire
- Died: c. 1580 Constantinople, Ottoman Empire

Religious life
- Religion: Judaism

Moses ben Baruch Almosnino (c. 1515 – c. 1580) was a distinguished rabbi in the Ottoman Empire; born at Thessaloniki about 1515, and died in Constantinople about 1580.

== Rabbinical work ==
He was elected rabbi of the Neveh Shalom community of Spanish Jews in that city in 1553, and of the Livyat Hen congregation in 1560. He was eminent alike for knowledge of rabbinical matters and for scholarship in the science of his day, particularly natural physics and astronomy, furnishing commentaries upon many treatises translated from the Arabic and Latin.

In 1565, he successfully represented his brethren at an audience with the sultan Selim II, petitioning for the confirmation of their civil rights.

== Contribution to Judaic Writings ==
In 1570, Almosnino wrote a lengthy Hebrew commentary on the Biblical "Five scrolls"—the books of Canticles, Ruth, Lamentations, Ecclesiastes, and Esther—under the title Yede Mosheh ("The Hands of Moses"); also an exposition of the Talmudical treatise Abot "Ethics of the Fathers" called Pirkei Moshe, published at Salonica in 1563; and a collection of sermons delivered upon various occasions, particularly funeral orations, entitled Meammeẓ. Koah ("Reenforcing Strength.") These were published in Hebrew by his son Simon, the expense being defrayed by two other sons, Abraham and Absalom.

Another Hebrew work by Almosnino was Tefillah le-Mosheh ("The Prayer of Moses"), an apologetic work on the Pentateuch, published at Salonica in 1563, and republished at Kraków in 1598 and 1805.

Almosnino also wrote a homiletic in Judaeo-Spanish, Regimiento de la Vida, which is written as a guide to his son about how one should live his life, treats among other things of the origin of good and evil, the influence of the stars, Providence, the moral life, education of children, and free will. To this was appended a chapter on "Dreams, Their Origin and True Nature," written, as it is stated, at the request of Don Joseph Nasi, Duke of Naxos. The work was printed in Rashi script at the press of Joseph Jaabez, Salonica, 1564, and was republished at Venice in 1604, and at Salonica in 1729. An appendix of five pages contains a list of difficult Spanish words, occurring therein, translated into Hebrew. An edition in Spanish letters was published by Samuel Mendes de Sola and associates in Amsterdam, 1729, dedicated to Aaron David Pinto. This work is considered one of the rarest in the Spanish language. A historical work by Almosnino, Extremos y Grandezas de Constantinopla, also in Spanish with Hebrew characters, was transliterated and republished by Jacob Cansino, Madrid, 1638.

According to Moritz Steinschneider (Die Hebräischen Uebersetzungen des Mittelalters und die Juden als Dolmetscher, p. 215), Moses Almosnino was also author of a commentary upon Aristotle's Ethics. Eliakim Carmoly (p. 12) mentions it under the title of Pene Mosheh ("The Face of Moses"), stating that it was written by Moses at Palestria near Salonica, and that his son Simon, after his father's death, desired to publish it (1584).
