= Rita Hayworth =

American actress and dancer (1918–1987)

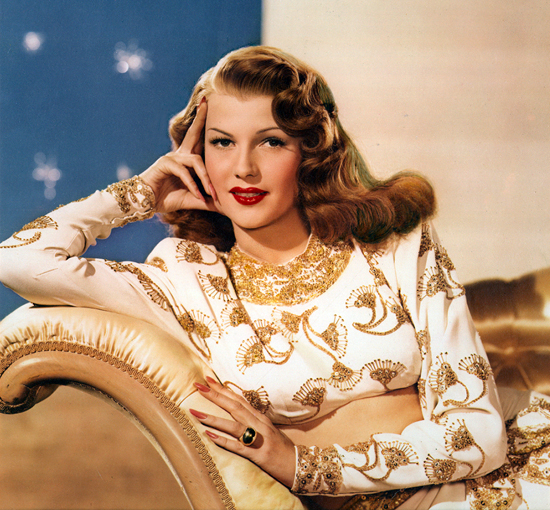
- Hayworth in 1946
- Born: Margarita Carmen Cansino; October 17, 1918; New York City, U.S.
- Died: May 14, 1987 (aged 68); New York City, U.S.
- Resting place: Holy Cross Cemetery, Culver City
- Occupations: Actress; dancer; pin-up girl
- Years active: 1926; 1934–1972
- Height: 5 ft 6 in (168 cm)
- Political party: Democratic
- Spouses: Edward C. Judson (m. 1937; div. 1942) Orson Welles (m. 1943; div. 1947) Aly Khan (m. 1949; div. 1953) Dick Haymes (m. 1953; div. 1955) James Hill (m. 1958; div. 1961)
- Children: 2, including Yasmin Aga Khan
- Parents: Eduardo Cansino (father); Volga Hayworth (mother)
- Relatives: Antonio Cansino (grandfather); Elisa Cansino (aunt); Richard Cansino (nephew); Vinton Hayworth (uncle); Gonzalo García (second-grandnephew)
- Awards: Hollywood Walk of Fame

Rita Hayworth (born Margarita Carmen Cansino; October 17, 1918 – May 14, 1987) was an American actress, dancer and pin-up girl. She achieved fame in the 1940s as one of the top stars of the Golden Age of Hollywood, and appeared in 61 films over 38 years. The press nicknamed her "The Love Goddess" during the peak of her fame in the 1940s. She was the second favorite pin-up girl for GIs during World War II, after Betty Grable.

Hayworth is widely known for her performance in the 1946 film Gilda, opposite Glenn Ford, in which she played the femme fatale in her first major dramatic role. She is also known for her performances in Only Angels Have Wings (1939), The Strawberry Blonde (1941), Blood and Sand (1941), The Lady from Shanghai (1947), Pal Joey (1957), and Separate Tables (1958). Fred Astaire, with whom she made two films, You'll Never Get Rich (1941) and You Were Never Lovelier (1942), once called her his favorite dance partner. She also starred in the Technicolor musical Cover Girl (1944), with Gene Kelly. She is listed as one of the top 25 female motion picture stars of all time in the American Film Institute's survey AFI's 100 Years...100 Stars. For her contribution to the motion picture industry, Hayworth received a star on the Hollywood Walk of Fame at 1645 Vine Street in 1960.

In 1980, Hayworth was diagnosed with early-onset Alzheimer's disease, which contributed to her death in 1987 at age 68. The public disclosure and discussion of her illness drew attention to Alzheimer's and helped increase public and private funding for research into the disease.

== Early life ==
Hayworth was born as Margarita Carmen Cansino in Manhattan, New York City, the eldest of three children born to dancer parents. It has been speculated by friends that she was Romani, but this has never been confirmed and she referred to herself as "just another dirty-faced Mexican kid". In academic journals, in an article focused on ethnic represenation in Hollywood, she is described as "Latin" and "Spanish-Irish American". Her Spanish-born father Eduardo Cansino was from Castilleja de la Cuesta, a town near Seville, Spain. Her mother, Volga Hayworth, was of Irish and English descent who had performed with the Ziegfeld Follies. The couple married in 1917. They also had two sons. Her maternal uncle Vinton Hayworth was an actor. Hayworth grew up Woodside, Queens.

Eduardo Cansino wanted his daughter to become a professional dancer, while her mother hoped she would become an actress. Her paternal grandfather, Antonio Cansino, was a renowned classical Spanish dancer. He popularized the bolero, and his dancing school in Madrid was world-famous. Antonio Cansino instructed his granddaughter in her first dance lesson. Hayworth later recalled, "From the time I was three and a half... as soon as I could stand on my own feet, I was given dance lessons". She said: "I didn't like it very much... but I didn't have the courage to tell my father, so I began taking the lessons. Rehearse, rehearse, rehearse, that was my girlhood".

She attended dance classes every day for a few years in a Carnegie Hall complex, where she was taught by her uncle Angel Cansino. Before her fifth birthday she was one of the Four Cansinos featured in the Broadway production of The Greenwich Village Follies at the Winter Garden Theatre. In 1926, at the age of eight, she was featured in La Fiesta, a short film for Warner Bros.

In 1927, her father took the family to Hollywood. He believed that dancing could be featured in the movies and that his family could be part of it. He established his own dance studio, where he taught such stars as James Cagney and Jean Harlow.

In 1931, Eduardo Cansino partnered with his 12-year-old daughter to form an act called the Dancing Cansinos. Her hair was dyed from brown to black to give her a more mature and "Latin" appearance. Since under California law Margarita was too young to work in nightclubs and bars, her father took her with him to work across the border in Tijuana, Mexico. In the early 1930s, it was a popular tourist spot for people from Los Angeles. Because she was working, Hayworth never graduated from high school, but she completed the ninth grade at Hamilton High in Los Angeles.

Hayworth later told Orson Welles that her father began to sexually abuse her when they were touring together as the Dancing Cansinos. Her biographer, Barbara Leaming, wrote that her mother may have been the only person to know of the abuse; she slept in the same bed as her daughter to try to protect her. Leaming wrote that the abuse contributed to Hayworth's difficulty in relationships as an adult.

Hayworth took a bit part in the film Cruz Diablo (1934) at age 16, which led to another bit part in the film In Caliente (1935) with the Mexican actress Dolores del Río. She danced with her father in such nightspots as the Foreign and the Caliente clubs. Winfield Sheehan, the head of the Fox Film Corporation, saw her dancing at the Caliente Club and quickly arranged for her to do a screen test a week later. Impressed by her screen persona, Sheehan signed her to a six-month contract at Fox under the name Rita Cansino, the first of two name changes during her career.

== Career ==
=== Early career ===
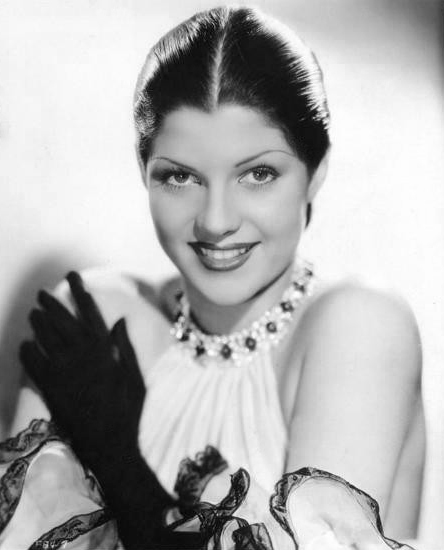
Fox publicity photo of Rita Cansino, 1935

During her time at Fox, Hayworth was billed as Rita Cansino and appeared in minor roles, often cast as the exotic foreigner. In late 1934, aged 16, she performed a dance sequence in the Spencer Tracy film Dante's Inferno (1935), and was put under contract in February 1935. She had her first speaking role as an Argentinian girl in Under the Pampas Moon (1935). She played an Egyptian girl in Charlie Chan in Egypt (1935), and a Russian dancer in Paddy O'Day (1935). Sheehan was grooming her for the lead in the 1936 Technicolor film Ramona, hoping to establish her as Fox Film's new Dolores del Río.

By the end of her six-month contract, Fox had merged into 20th Century Fox, with Darryl F. Zanuck serving as the executive producer. Dismissing Sheehan's interest in her and giving Loretta Young the lead in Ramona, Zanuck did not renew Hayworth's contract. Sensing her screen potential, salesman and promoter Edward C. Judson, with whom she would elope in 1937, got freelance work for her in several small-studio films and a part in the Columbia Pictures feature Meet Nero Wolfe (1936). Studio head Harry Cohn signed her to a seven-year contract and tried her out in small roles.

Cohn argued that her image was too Mediterranean, which limited her to being stereotyped in "exotic" roles that were fewer in number. He was heard to say her last name sounded too Spanish. Judson acted on Cohn's advice: Rita Cansino became Rita Hayworth when she adopted her mother's maiden name, to the consternation of her father. Therefore, Cohn argued, people were more likely to regard her as a white American. With Cohn and Judson's encouragement, Hayworth also changed her hair color to ginger red hair and had electrolysis to raise her hairline and broaden the appearance of her forehead.

Hayworth appeared in five minor Columbia pictures and three minor independent movies in 1937. The following year, she appeared in five Columbia B movies. In 1939, Cohn pressured director Howard Hawks to use Hayworth for a small, but important, role as a man-trap in the aviation drama Only Angels Have Wings, in which she played opposite Cary Grant and Jean Arthur.

Cohn began to build up Hayworth in 1940 in features such as Music in My Heart, The Lady in Question, and Angels Over Broadway. That year, she was first featured in a Life magazine cover story. While on loan to Warner Bros., Hayworth appeared as the second female lead in The Strawberry Blonde (1941), opposite James Cagney.

With increased professional success she returned to Columbia Pictures, and was cast in the musical You'll Never Get Rich (1941) opposite Fred Astaire in one of the highest-budgeted films Columbia had ever made. The picture was so successful, the studio produced and released another Astaire-Hayworth picture the following year, You Were Never Lovelier. Astaire's biographer Peter Levinson writes that the dancing combination of Astaire and Hayworth was "absolute magnetism on the screen". Although Astaire made 10 films with Ginger Rogers, his other main dancing partner, Hayworth's sensuality surpassed Rogers' cool technical expertise. "Rita's youthful exuberance meshed perfectly with Fred's maturity and elegance", says Levinson.

When Astaire was asked who his favorite dance partner was, he tried not answering the question, but later admitted it was Hayworth: "All right, I'll give you a name", he said. "But if you ever let it out, I'll swear I lied. It was Rita Hayworth". Astaire commented that "Rita danced with trained perfection and individuality ... She was better when she was 'on' than at rehearsal". Biographer Charlie Reinhart describes the effect she had on Astaire's style:

There was a kind of reserve about Fred. It was charming. It carried over to his dancing. With Hayworth there was no reserve. She was very explosive. And that's why I think they really complemented each other.

In August 1941, Hayworth was featured in a highly publicized Life photo in which she posed in a negligee with a black lace bodice. Bob Landry's photo made Hayworth one of the favorite pin-up girls of the World War II years; the other was Betty Grable, in a 1943 photograph. For two years, Hayworth's photograph was the most requested pin-up photograph in circulation. In 2002, the satin nightgown Hayworth wore in the photo sold for $26,888.

In March 1942, Hayworth visited Brazil as a cultural ambassador for the Franklin D. Roosevelt administration's Good Neighbor policy, under the auspices of the Office of the Coordinator of Inter-American Affairs. During the 1940s Hayworth also contributed to the OCIAA's cultural diplomacy initiatives in support of Pan-Americanism through her broadcasts to South America on the CBS "Cadena de las Américas" radio network.

In 1943, she was suspended without pay for nine weeks because she refused to appear in Once Upon a Time.

=== Peak years at Columbia ===
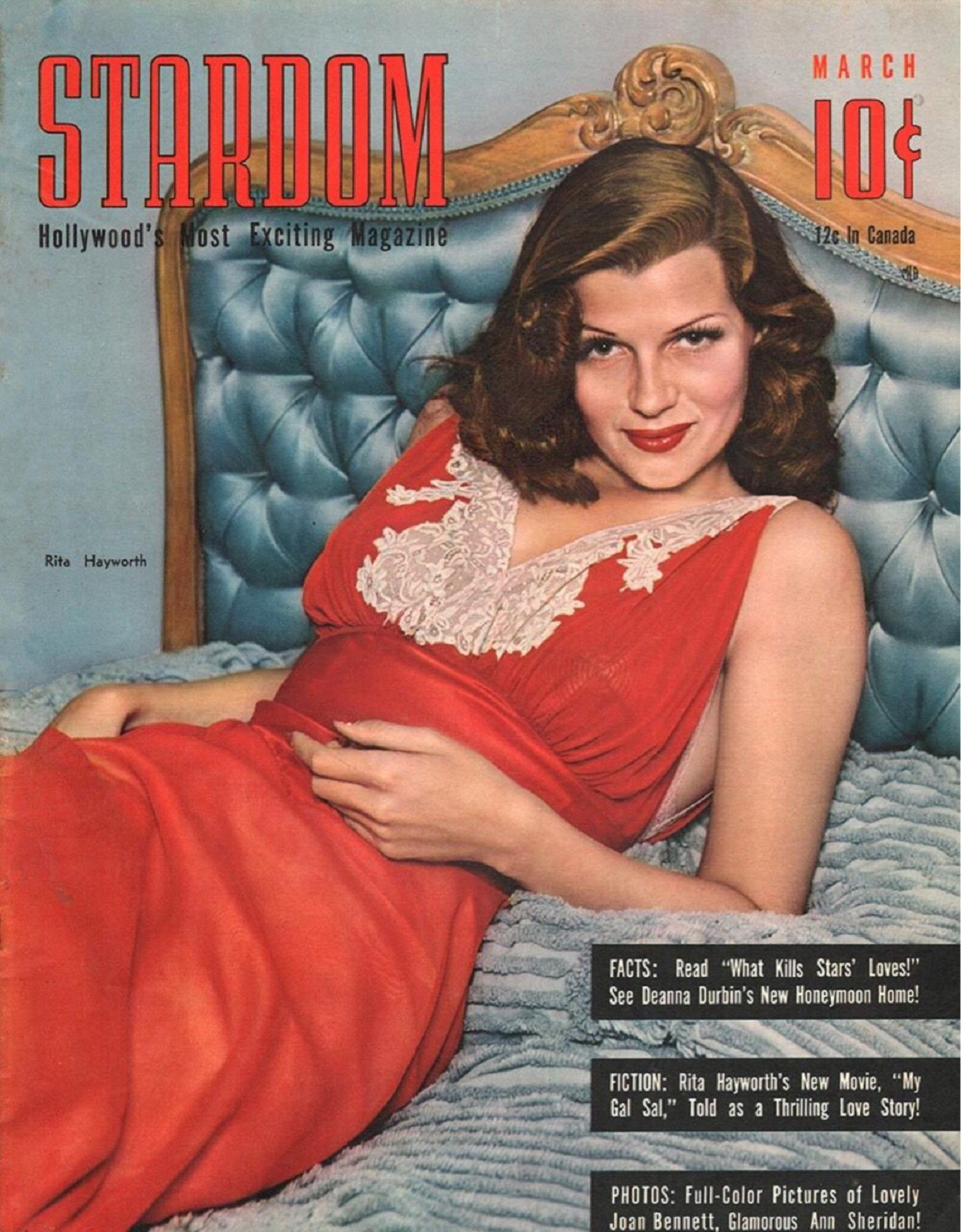
Hayworth on the cover of Stardom magazine, March 1942

Hayworth had top billing in one of her best-known films, the Technicolor musical Cover Girl, released in 1944. The film established her as Columbia's top star of the 1940s; as a result she was the first of only six women to dance on screen with both Gene Kelly and Fred Astaire. "I guess the only jewels of my life", Hayworth said in 1970, "were the pictures I made with Fred Astaire ... And Cover Girl, too".

For three consecutive years, starting in 1944, Hayworth was named one of the top movie box-office attractions in the world. She was adept in ballet, tap, ballroom, and Spanish routines. Cohn continued to showcase Hayworth's dance talents. Columbia featured her in the Technicolor films Tonight and Every Night (1945) with Lee Bowman and Down to Earth (1947) with Larry Parks.

Her sexy, glamorous appeal was most noted in Charles Vidor's Gilda, a 1946 film noir, wherein she co-starred with Glenn Ford, that came to the attention of censors. The role, in which Hayworth wore a black satin dress and performed a one-glove striptease, "Put The Blame On Mame", solidified her popular perception as a femme fatale.

While Gilda was in release, it was widely reported that an atomic bomb that was scheduled to be tested at Bikini Atoll in the Pacific Ocean's Marshall Islands would bear an image of Hayworth, a reference to her bombshell status. Although the gesture was undoubtedly meant as a compliment, Hayworth was deeply offended. Orson Welles, then married to Hayworth, recalled her anger in an interview with biographer Barbara Leaming: "Rita used to fly into terrible rages all the time, but the angriest was when she found out that they'd put her on the atom bomb. Rita almost went insane, she was so angry.... She wanted to go to Washington to hold a press conference, but Harry Cohn wouldn't let her because it would be unpatriotic". Welles tried to persuade Hayworth that the whole business was not a publicity stunt on Cohn's part, that it was simply homage to her from the flight crew.

On June 30, 1946, broadcast of Orson Welles Commentaries, Welles said of the imminent test, "I want my daughter to be able to tell her daughter that grandmother's picture was on the last atom bomb ever to explode".

The fourth atomic bomb ever to be detonated was decorated with a photograph of Hayworth cut from the June 1946 issue of Esquire magazine. Above it was stenciled the device's nickname, "Gilda", the name of the film in which she was starring at the time, in two-inch black letters.

In 1947, Hayworth's new contract with Columbia provided a salary of $250,000 plus 50% of films' profits.

Hayworth's performance in Welles's 1947 film The Lady from Shanghai was critically acclaimed. The film's failure at the box office was attributed in part to Hayworth's famous red hair being cut short and bleached platinum blonde for the role. Cohn had not been consulted and was furious that Hayworth's image was changed.

Also in 1947, Hayworth was featured in a Life cover story by Winthrop Sargeant that resulted in her being nicknamed "The Love Goddess". The term was adopted and used as the title of a biopic and of a biography about her. In a 1980s interview, Hayworth said, "Everybody else does nude scenes, but I don't. I never made nude movies. I didn't have to do that. I danced. I was provocative, I guess, in some things. But I was not completely exposed".

Hayworth's next film, The Loves of Carmen (1948) with Glenn Ford, was the first film co-produced by Columbia and Hayworth's production company, The Beckworth Corporation (named for Rebecca, her daughter with Welles). It was Columbia's biggest commercial success that year. She received a percentage of the profits from this and all her subsequent films until 1954, when she dissolved Beckworth to pay off debts.

=== Hiatus and return ===
In 1948, at the height of her fame, Hayworth met Aly Khan. They were married on May 27, 1949. Hayworth left Hollywood and sailed for France, breaking her contract with Columbia. An Ismaili Muslim suggested that Rita take the name Rehmat Khanum, meaning "Lady of the Blessings of the Almighty".

In 1951, Columbia alleged it had $800,000 invested in properties for her, including the film she had walked out on that year. A 1951 article in the British periodical The People called for a boycott of Hayworth's films:

Hollywood must be told its already tarnished reputation will sink to rock bottom if it restores this reckless woman to a place among its stars.

After the collapse of her marriage to Khan, Hayworth returned to Hollywood to star in the film, Affair in Trinidad (1952), which again paired her with Glenn Ford. Director Vincent Sherman recalled that Hayworth seemed "rather frightened at the approach of doing another picture". She continued to clash with Cohn and was placed on suspension during filming. Hayworth refused to report for work because she objected to the script. In 1970, she said,

I was in Switzerland when they sent me the script for Affair in Trinidad and I threw it across the room. But I did the picture, and Pal Joey, too. I came back to Columbia because I wanted to work and first, see, I had to finish that goddamn contract, which is how Harry Cohn owned me!

Nevertheless, the picture was highly publicized. Affair in Trinidad ended up grossing $1 million more than her previous blockbuster, Gilda.

Hayworth continued to star in a string of successful pictures. In 1953, she starred in two film releases: Salome with Charles Laughton and Stewart Granger, and Miss Sadie Thompson with José Ferrer and Aldo Ray. She did not act in film again for another four years, mainly because of a tumultuous marriage to the singer Dick Haymes. During her marriage to Haymes, she was involved in much negative publicity, which significantly lessened her appeal. In 1955, she sued Columbia Pictures to be released from her contract, but asked for her $150,000 salary, alleging that the filming failed to start on Joseph and His Brethren (1961) when agreed. The film was later filmed in 1961 by a foreign company as The Story of Joseph and His Brethren (film). Cohn expressed frustration with Hayworth in a 1957 interview with Time magazine:

Hayworth might be worth ten million dollars today easily! She owned 25% of the profits with her own company and had hit after hit and she had to get married and had to get out of the business and took a suspension because she fell in love again! In five years, at two pictures a year, at 25%! Think of what she could have made! But she didn't make pictures! She took two or three suspensions! She got mixed up with different characters! Unpredictable!

By the time Hayworth returned to the screen for Fire Down Below (1957) with Robert Mitchum and Jack Lemmon, Kim Novak had become Columbia's top female star. Her last musical was Pal Joey (1957) with Frank Sinatra and Novak (Hayworth had top billing in both pictures but actually played a supporting role in Pal Joey). Henceforth, Hayworth permanently ceased to work for Columbia.

=== Later career ===
Hayworth received good reviews for her performances in Separate Tables (1958), with Burt Lancaster and David Niven; and They Came to Cordura (1959), with Gary Cooper and The Story on Page One (1960). She was intended to be cast in Summer of the Seventeenth Doll with Lancaster but both withdrew after the original play failed on Broadway. She continued working throughout the 1960s. In 1962, her planned Broadway debut in Step on a Crack was cancelled for undisclosed health reasons. In 1964 Circus World was released, in which John Wayne was her co-star and for which she received a Golden Globe nomination as Best Actress in a dramatic role. The Money Trap (1965) paired her, for the last time, with good friend Glenn Ford.

Even after Harry Cohn had died, Hayworth still resented her treatment by both him and Columbia. She said in a 1968 interview:

I used to have to punch a time clock at Columbia. Every day of my life. That's what it was like. I was under exclusive contract, like they owned me ... I think he had my dressing room bugged ... He was very possessive of me as a person, he didn't want me to go out with anybody, have any friends. No one can live that way. So I fought him ... You want to know what I think of Harry Cohn? He was a monster.

Hayworth resented that the studio had failed to train her to sing or even to encourage her to learn to sing.

Hayworth continued to act in films until the early 1970s. She made comedic television appearances on Laugh In and The Carol Burnett Show in the 1970s. Her penultimate film was French director Georges Lautner's Road to Salina (1970), starring Mimsy Farmer and Robert Walker Jr. Her last film was The Wrath of God (1972), a western.

=== Public image ===
At the peak of her fame in the 1940s, Hayworth was a pin-up girl for military servicemen and a fashion ideal for women. At 5 ft 6 in (1.68 m) and 120 lb (54 kg), she was tall enough to be a concern for dancing partners such as Fred Astaire. She reportedly changed her hair color eight times in eight movies.

In 1949, Hayworth's lips were voted best in the world by the Artists League of America. She had a modeling contract with Max Factor to promote its Tru-Color lipsticks and Pan-Stik and Pan–Cake makeup.

== Personal life ==
In 1941, Hayworth said she was the antithesis of the characters she played: "I naturally am very shy ... and I suffer from an inferiority complex". Her provocative role in Gilda, in particular, made people expect her to be what she was not. Hayworth once said, with some bitterness, "Men go to bed with Gilda, but wake up with me". She said, "Basically, I am a good, gentle person, but I am attracted to mean personalities".

=== Marriages, relationships and family ===
Hayworth married and divorced five times in 24 years. She had affairs with several of her leading men, most notably Victor Mature in 1942, during the filming of My Gal Sal.

Hayworth had two daughters and two grandsons, one by each daughter. Her older daughter was the daughter of her second husband, Orson Welles. She had a son who was placed for adoption at birth, by some accounts, at Hayworth's urging, and he is featured in the 2008 documentary film Prodigal Sons.

Hayworth's younger daughter, Yasmin Aga Khan, is the daughter of Aly Khan.

==== Edward Charles Judson ====
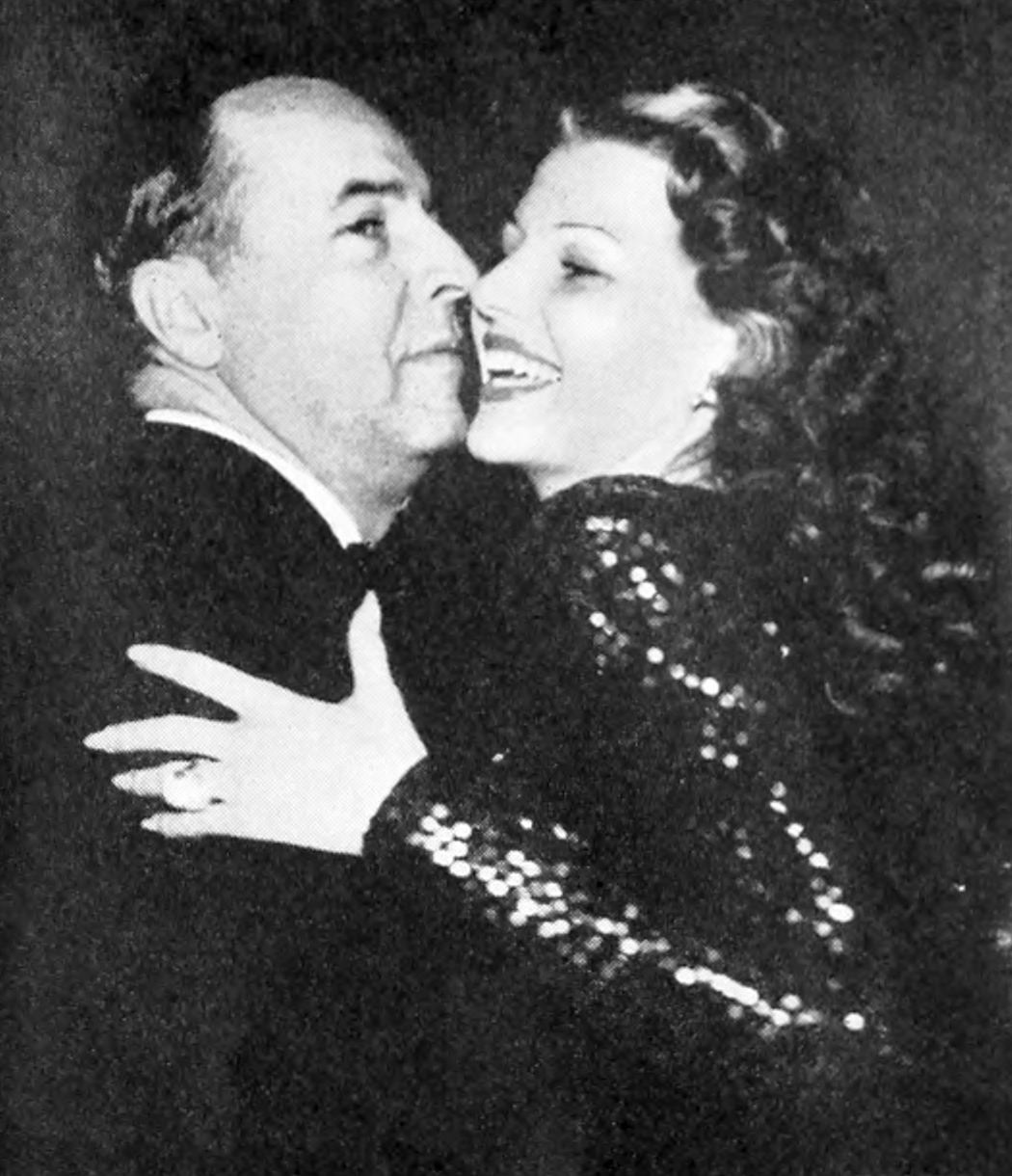
Edward Judson and Hayworth in 1942

In 1936, at age 18, Hayworth married Edward C. Judson, an oilman turned promoter who was 23 years older than her. They married in Las Vegas. Judson, who helped launch her acting career, was a shrewd businessman, but domineering. "He helped me with my career", Hayworth conceded after they divorced, adding "and helped himself to my money". She alleged that Judson compelled her to transfer much of her property to him, and she promised to pay him $12,000 under threats that he would do her "great bodily harm".

Hayworth filed for divorce from him on February 24, 1942, with a complaint of cruelty. She noted to the press that his work took him to Oklahoma and Texas while she lived and worked in Hollywood. Judson was as old as her father, who was enraged by the marriage, which caused a rift between Hayworth and her parents until the divorce. Judson had failed to tell Hayworth before they married that he had previously been married twice. When she left him, she had no money.

==== Orson Welles ====
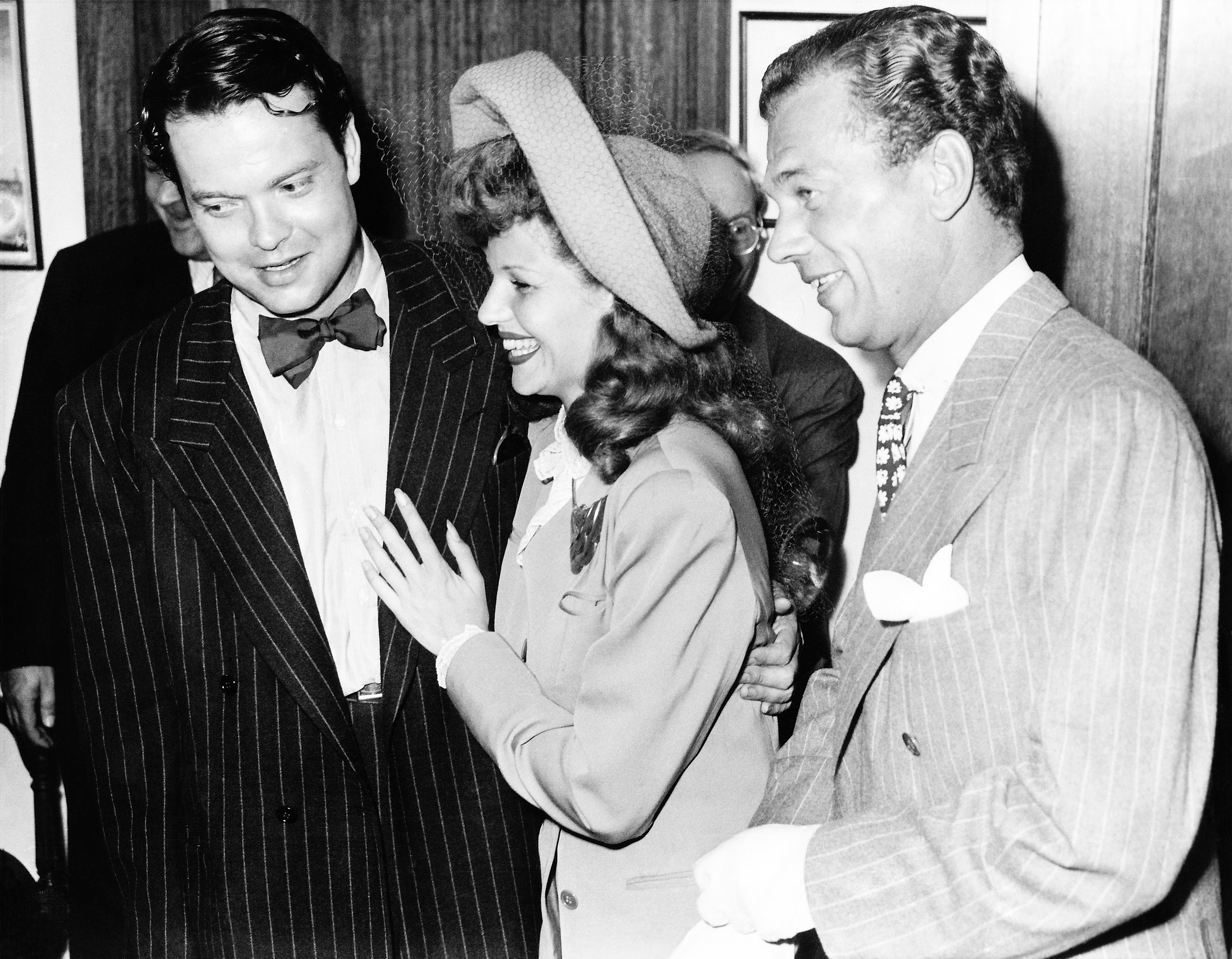
Wedding of Orson Welles and Hayworth, with best man Joseph Cotten, 1943

Hayworth married Orson Welles on September 7, 1943, during the run of The Mercury Wonder Show. None of her colleagues knew about the planned civil wedding ceremony until she announced it the day before. At the ceremony, she wore a beige suit, a ruffled white blouse, and a veil. A few hours after they got married, they returned to work at the studio. They had a daughter, Rebecca, who was born on December 17, 1944, and died at the age of 59 on October 17, 2004. They struggled in their marriage, with Hayworth saying that Welles did not want to be tied down:

During the entire period of our marriage, he showed no interest in establishing a home. When I suggested purchasing a home, he told me he didn't want the responsibility. Mr. Welles told me he never should have married in the first place; that it interfered with his freedom in his way of life.

On November 10, 1947, she was granted a divorce that became final the next year. The divorce was civil and they remained friendly afterwards.

==== Relationship with Glenn Ford ====
Hayworth had an intermittent, long-term relationship with Glenn Ford that started during the filming of Gilda in 1945 and continued through their numerous marriages. Their relationship is documented in the 2011 biography Glenn Ford: A Life by Ford's son, Peter Ford. Peter writes that Hayworth became pregnant during the filming of The Loves of Carmen and traveled to France to get an abortion. Ford later moved next door to her in Beverly Hills in 1960, and they continued their relationship until the early 1980s.

==== Aly Khan ====
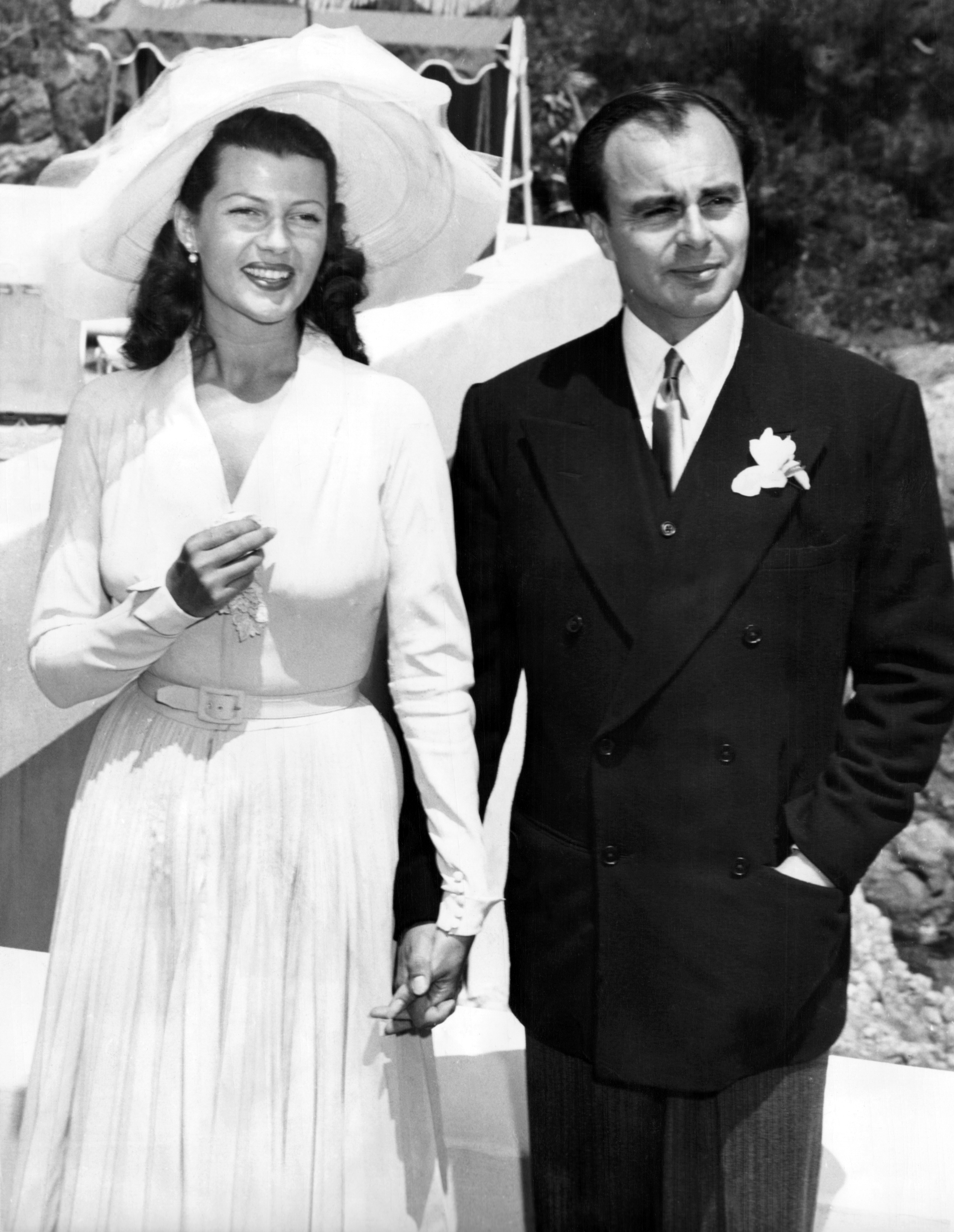
Hayworth and Aly Khan at their wedding reception in the garden of the Château de l'Horizon near Cannes, 1949

In 1948, Hayworth left her film career to marry Aly Khan, a son of Sultan Mohammed Shah, Aga Khan III, the leader of the Ismaili community of Shia Islam. They were married on May 27, 1949. Aly Khan and his family were heavily involved in horse racing, owning and racing horses. Hayworth had no interest in the sport but became a member of the Del Mar Thoroughbred Club anyway. Her filly, Double Rose, won several races in France and finished second in the 1949 Prix de l'Arc de Triomphe.

In 1951, while still married to Hayworth, Khan was spotted dancing with the actress Joan Fontaine in the nightclub where he and Hayworth had met. Hayworth threatened to divorce him in Reno, Nevada. In May, Hayworth moved to Nevada to establish legal residence to qualify for a divorce. She stayed at Lake Tahoe with their daughter, saying there was a risk the child would be kidnapped. Hayworth filed for divorce from Khan on September 2, 1951, on the grounds of "extreme cruelty, entirely mental in nature".

Hayworth said she might convert to Islam, but did not. During the custody fight over their daughter, Yasmin Aga Khan, born December 28, 1949, Aly said he wanted her to be raised as a Muslim; Hayworth wanted the child to be raised as a Christian. Hayworth rejected his offer of $1 million if she would rear Yasmin as a Muslim from age seven and allow her to go to Europe to visit him for two or three months each year, saying:

Nothing will make me give up Yasmin's chance to live here in America among our precious freedoms and habits. While I respect the Moslem faith, and all other faiths, it is my earnest wish that my daughter be raised as a normal, healthy American girl in the Christian faith. There isn't any amount of money in the entire world for which it is worth sacrificing this child's privilege of living as a normal Christian girl here in the United States. There just isn't anything else in the world that can compare with her sacred chance to do that. And I'm going to give it to Yasmin regardless of what it costs.

In January 1953, Hayworth was granted a divorce from Aly Khan on the grounds of extreme mental cruelty. Yasmin, three years old, played about the court while the case was being heard, finally climbing onto the judge's lap.

==== Dick Haymes ====
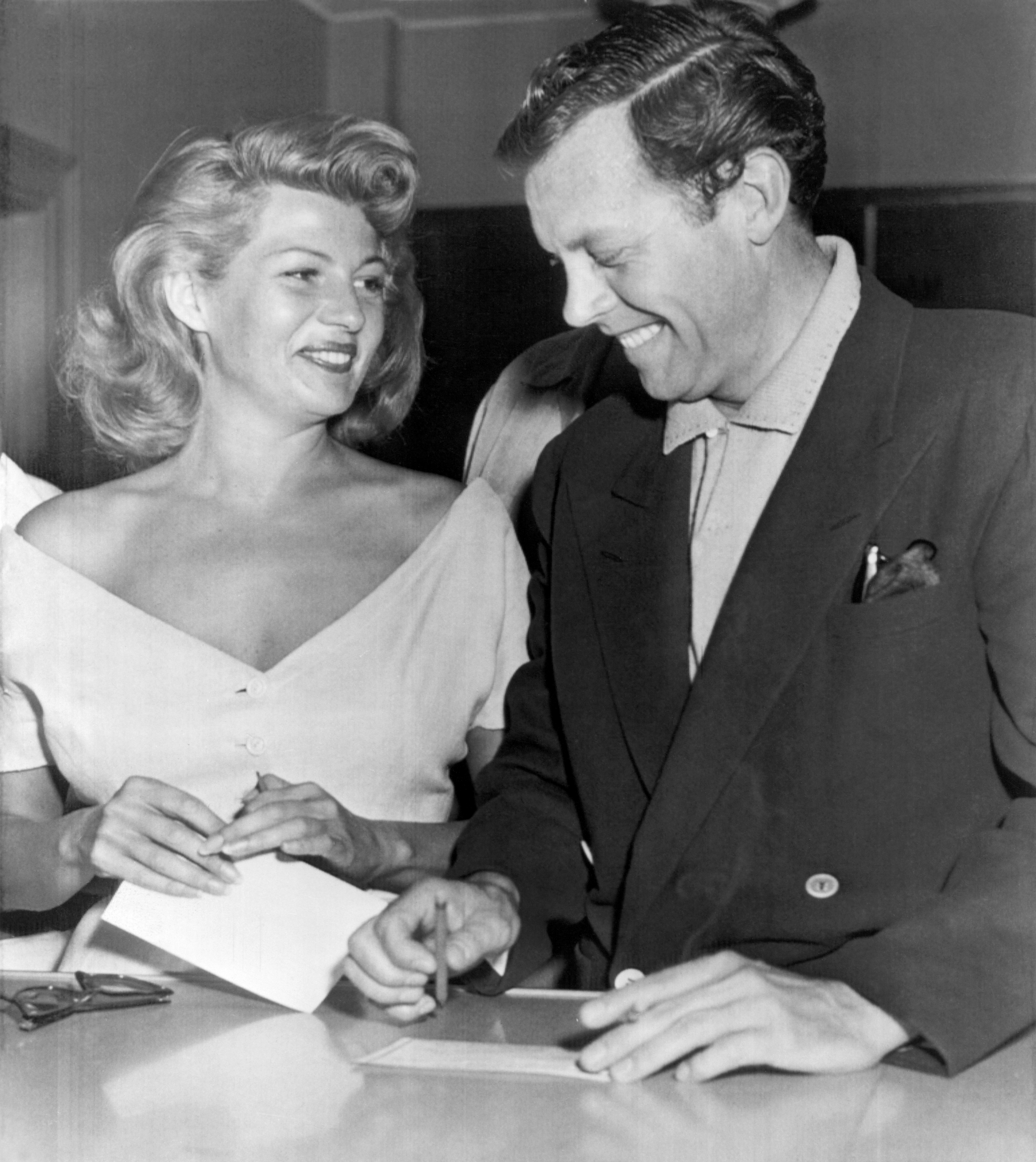
Hayworth and Dick Haymes obtaining their marriage license in Las Vegas, 1953

When Hayworth and Dick Haymes first met, he was married and his singing career was waning. Haymes was desperate for money because two of his ex-wives were suing him for unpaid child support. His financial problems were so bad that when he tried to return to California, he was arrested.

On July 7, 1954, his ex-wife Nora Eddington got a bench warrant for his arrest because he owed her $3,800 in alimony. Less than a week earlier, his ex-wife Joanne Dru also got a bench warrant because she said he owed $4,800 in child support payments for their three children. Hayworth ended up paying most of Haymes's debts.

Haymes was born in Argentina and did not have solid proof of US citizenship. Not long after he met Hayworth, US officials initiated proceedings to have him deported to Argentina for being an illegal alien. He hoped Hayworth could influence the government and keep him in the United States. When she assumed responsibility for his citizenship, a bond was formed that led to marriage. The two married on September 24, 1953, at the Sands Hotel, Las Vegas, and their wedding procession went through the casino.

From the start of their marriage, Haymes owed large amounts of money to the Internal Revenue Service (IRS). When Hayworth took time off from attending his comeback performances in Philadelphia, audiences sharply declined. Haymes's $5,000 weekly salary was attached by the IRS to pay a $100,000 bill, and he was unable to pay his pianist. Haymes's ex-wives demanded money while Hayworth publicly bemoaned her own lack of alimony from Aly Khan. At one point, the couple was effectively imprisoned for 24 hours in Manhattan at the Hotel Madison while sheriff's deputies waited outside, threatening to arrest Haymes for outstanding debts.

At the same time, Hayworth was fighting a severe custody battle with Khan, during which she reported death threats against their children. While living in New York, Hayworth sent the children to live with their nanny in Westchester County. They were found and photographed by a reporter from Confidential magazine.

After two years together, Haymes struck Hayworth in the face in 1955 in public at the Cocoanut Grove nightclub in Los Angeles. Hayworth immediately separated from him. The assault and crisis affected her health, and her doctor ordered her to remain in bed for several days.

Hayworth was in financial hardship after her marriage to Haymes. She had failed to gain child support from Aly Khan. She sued Orson Welles for back payment of child support, which she claimed had never been paid. This effort was unsuccessful and added to her stress.

==== James Hill ====
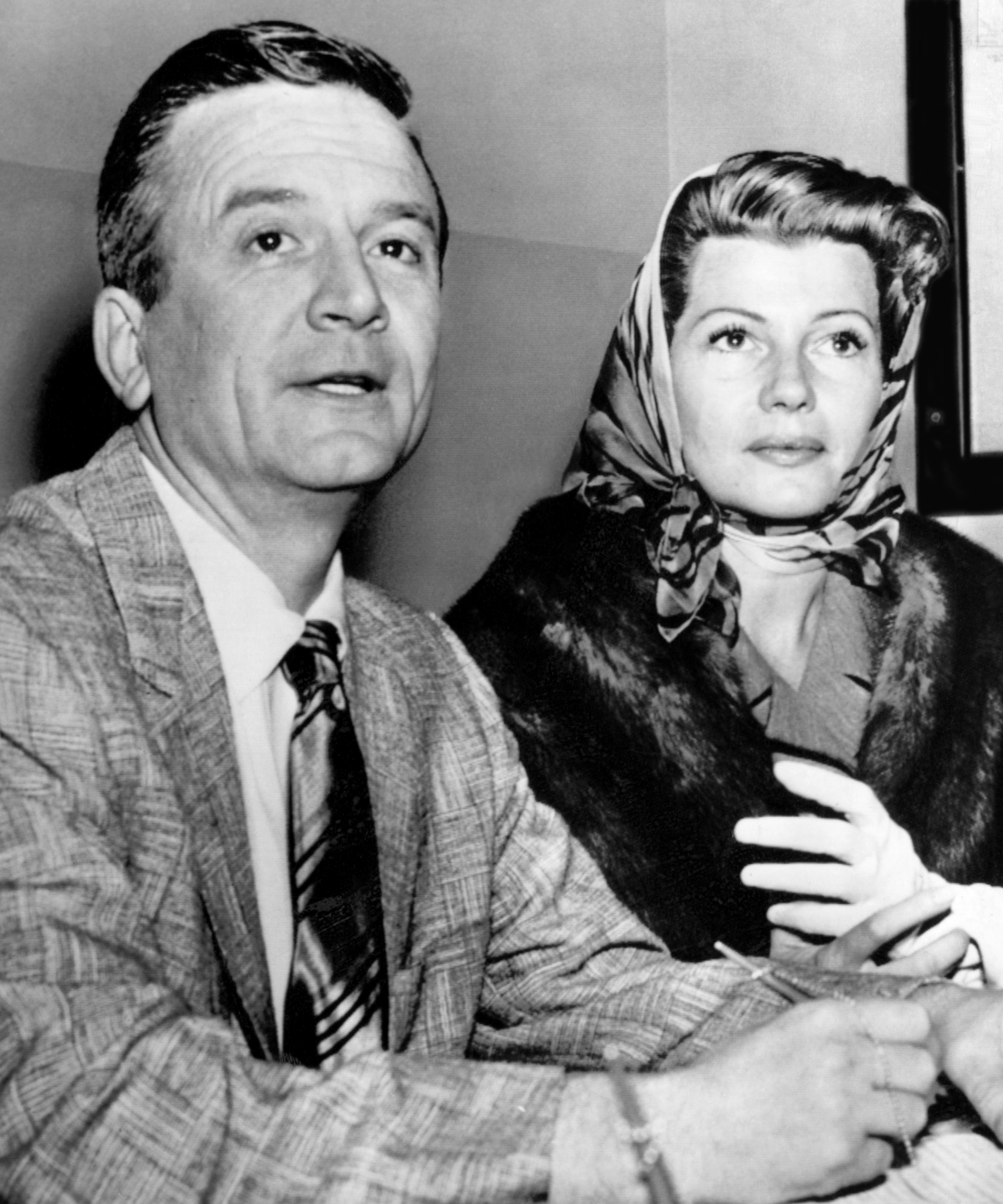
James Hill and Hayworth obtaining their marriage license in Santa Monica, 1958

Hayworth began a relationship with film producer James Hill, whom she married on February 2, 1958. He put her in one of her last major films, Separate Tables. This film was popular and highly praised, although The Harvard Lampoon named her the worst actress of 1958 for her performance. On September 1, 1961, Hayworth filed for divorce, alleging extreme mental cruelty. Hill later wrote Rita Hayworth: A Memoir, in which he suggested that their marriage collapsed because he wanted Hayworth to continue making movies while she wanted them both to retire from Hollywood.

In his autobiography, Charlton Heston wrote about Hayworth's marriage to Hill. One night, Heston and his wife Lydia joined the couple for dinner at a restaurant in Spain with the director George Marshall and the actor Rex Harrison, Hayworth's co-star in The Happy Thieves. Heston wrote that the occasion "turned into the single most embarrassing evening of my life", describing how Hill heaped "obscene abuse" on Hayworth until she was "reduced to a helpless flood of tears, her face buried in her hands". Heston wrote that the others sat stunned, witnesses to a "marital massacre", and, though he was "strongly tempted to slug him" (Hill), he left with his wife after she stood up, almost in tears. Heston wrote, "I'm ashamed of walking away from Miss Hayworth's humiliation. I never saw her again".

=== Health ===
Orson Welles noted Hayworth's alcoholism during their marriage, but refused to recognize it. "It certainly imitated alcoholism in every superficial way", he recalled in 1983. "She'd fly into these rages, never at me, never once, always at Harry Cohn or her father or her mother or her brother. She would break all the furniture and she'd get in a car and I'd have to get in the car and try to control her. She'd drive up in the hills suicidally. Terrible, terrible nights. And I just saw this lovely girl destroying herself. I admire Yasmin so much".

Yasmin Aga Khan spoke of her mother's alcoholism:

I remember as a child that she had a drinking problem. She had difficulty coping with the ups and downs of the business ... As a child, I thought, 'She has a drinking problem, and she's an alcoholic.' That was very clear, and I thought, 'Well, there's not much I can do. I can just, sort of, stand by and watch.' It's very difficult, seeing your mother, going through her emotional problems and drinking and then behaving in that manner ... Her condition became quite bad. It worsened and she did have an alcoholic breakdown and landed in the hospital.

In 1972, Hayworth wanted to retire from acting, but she needed money. At the suggestion of Robert Mitchum, she agreed to film The Wrath of God. The experience exposed her poor health and her worsening mental state. Because she could not remember her lines, her scenes were shot one line at a time. In November, she agreed to complete one more movie, the British film Tales That Witness Madness, but because of her worsening health, she left the set and returned to the United States. She never returned to acting.

In March 1974, both her brothers died within a week of each other, which caused her great sadness and led to heavy drinking. In January 1976, at London's Heathrow Airport, Hayworth was removed from a TWA flight after having an angry outburst while traveling with her agent. The event attracted much publicity; a photograph where she looked disheveled was published in newspapers the next day. Hayworth's alcoholism hid symptoms of what was eventually understood to be Alzheimer's disease.

Yasmin Aga Khan spoke of her mother's disease:

It was the outbursts. She'd fly into a rage. I can't tell you. I thought it was alcoholism – alcoholic dementia. We all thought that. The papers picked that up, of course. You can't imagine the relief just in getting a diagnosis. We had a name at last, Alzheimer's! Of course, that didn't really come until the last seven or eight years. She wasn't diagnosed as having Alzheimer's until 1980. There were two decades of hell before that.

Biographer Barbara Leaming wrote that Hayworth aged prematurely because of her alcoholism and also because of the many stresses in her life. "Despite the artfully applied make-up and shoulder-length red hair, there was no concealing the ravages of drink and stress", she wrote of Hayworth's arrival in New York in May 1956 in order to begin work on Fire Down Below, her first film in three years. "Deep lines had crept around her eyes and mouth, and she appeared worn, exhausted – older than her thirty-eight years".

Alzheimer's disease had been largely forgotten by the medical community since its discovery in 1906. Medical historian Barron H. Lerner wrote that when Hayworth's diagnosis was made public in 1981, she became "the first public face of Alzheimer's, helping to ensure that future patients did not go undiagnosed ... Unbeknownst to her, Hayworth helped to destigmatize a condition that can still embarrass victims and their families".

In July 1981, Hayworth's health had deteriorated to the point that a Los Angeles Superior Court judge ruled that she should be placed under the care of her daughter, Yasmin Aga Khan of New York City. Hayworth lived in an apartment at The San Remo on Central Park West adjoining that of her daughter, who arranged for her mother's care during her final years. When asked how her mother was doing, Yasmin replied, "She's still beautiful. But it's a shell".

In 1983, Rebecca Welles arranged to see her mother for the first time in seven years. Speaking to his lifelong friend Roger Hill, Orson Welles expressed his concern about the visit's effect on his daughter. "Rita barely knows me now", Welles said. He recalled seeing Hayworth three years before at an event that the Reagans held for Frank Sinatra. "When it was over, I came over to her table, and I saw that she was very beautiful, very reposed looking, and didn't know me at first. After about four minutes of speaking, I could see that she realized who I was, and she began to cry quietly".

In an interview he gave the evening before his death in 1985, Welles called Hayworth "one of the dearest and sweetest women that ever lived".

=== Political views ===
Hayworth was a lifelong Democrat and an active member of the Hollywood Democratic Committee. She was active in the campaign of Franklin D. Roosevelt during the 1944 presidential election. In 1968, Hayworth was part of a Hollywood committee that endorsed Robert F. Kennedy's presidential campaign.

=== Religion ===
Hayworth was a Catholic whose marriage to Aly Khan was deemed illicit by Pope Pius XII.

=== Death ===
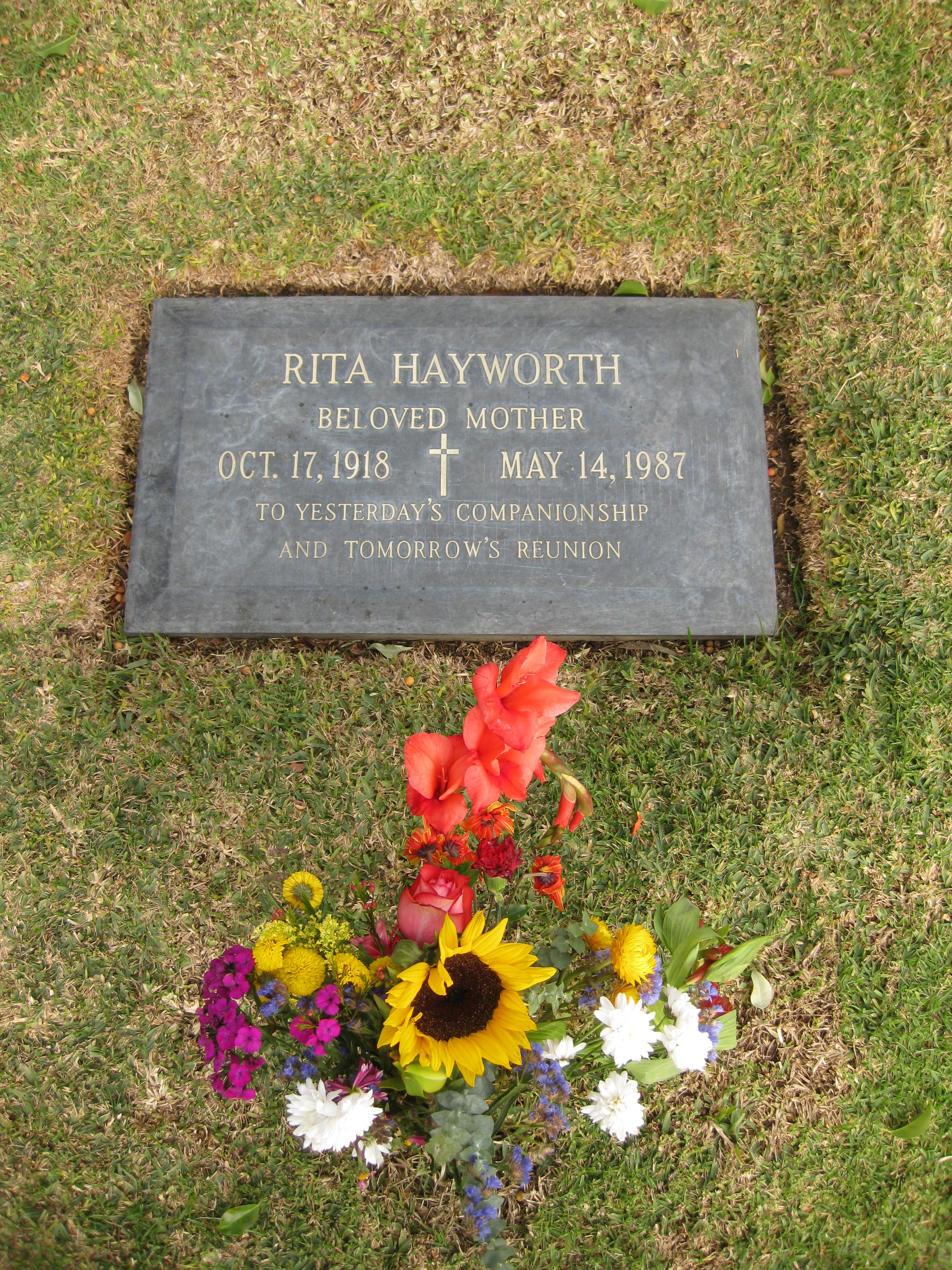
Hayworth's grave at Holy Cross Cemetery, Culver City, California

Hayworth lapsed into a semicoma in February 1987. She died at age 68 from complications associated with Alzheimer's disease, on May 14, 1987, at her home in Manhattan. President Ronald Reagan, who was one of Hayworth's contemporaries in Hollywood (and who also suffered from Alzheimer's in his final years), issued a statement:

Rita Hayworth was one of our country's most beloved stars. Glamorous and talented, she gave us many wonderful moments on stage and screen and delighted audiences from the time she was a young girl. In her later years, Rita became known for her struggle with Alzheimer's disease. Her courage and candor, and that of her family, were a great public service in bringing worldwide attention to a disease which we all hope will soon be cured. Nancy and I are saddened by Rita's death. She was a friend who we will miss. We extend our deep sympathy to her family.

A funeral service was held on May 18, 1987, at the Church of the Good Shepherd. Pallbearers included actors Ricardo Montalbán, Glenn Ford, Cesar Romero, Anthony Franciosa, choreographer Hermes Pan, and a family friend, Phillip Luchenbill. She was interred at Holy Cross Cemetery, Culver City. Her headstone includes Yasmin's sentiment: "To yesterday's companionship and tomorrow's reunion".

== Filmography ==
Film and television
Year	Title	Role	Notes	Ref.
1926	La Fiesta		Short; credited as Rita Cansino	
1934	Cruz Diablo	Extra	Uncredited	
1935	In Caliente		Credited as Rita Cansino	
1935	Under the Pampas Moon	Carmen	Credited as Rita Cansino	
1935	Charlie Chan in Egypt	Nayda	Credited as Rita Cansino	
1935	Dante's Inferno	Dancer	Credited as Rita Cansino	
1935	Piernas de seda	Ballerina	Uncredited	
1935	Hi, Gaucho!	Dolores	Uncredited	
1935	Paddy O'Day	Tamara Petrovitch	Credited as Rita Cansino	
1936	Professional Soldier	Gypsy Dancer	Credited as Rita Cansino	
1936	Human Cargo	Carmen Zoro	Credited as Rita Cansino	
1936	Dancing Pirate	Specialty Dancer	Uncredited	
1936	Meet Nero Wolfe	Maria Maringola	Credited as Rita Cansino	
1936	Rebellion	Paula Castillo	Alternative title: Lady from Frisco; Credited as Rita Cansino	
1937	Old Louisiana	Angela Gonzales	Alternative title: Louisiana Gal; Credited as Rita Cansino	
1937	Hit the Saddle	Rita	Credited as Rita Cansino	
1937	Trouble in Texas	Carmen Serano	Credited as Rita Cansino	
1937	Criminals of the Air	Rita Owens		
1937	Girls Can Play	Sue Collins		
1937	The Game That Kills	Betty Holland		
1937	Life Begins with Love	Dinner Guest's Girl Friend	Uncredited	
1937	Paid to Dance	Betty Morgan	Alternative title: Hard to Hold	
1937	The Shadow	Mary Gillespie		
1938	Who Killed Gail Preston?	Gail Preston		
1938	Special Inspector	Patricia Lane	Alternative title: Across the Border	
1938	There's Always a Woman	Mary—Ketterling's Secretary	Uncredited	
1938	Convicted	Jerry Wheeler		
1938	Juvenile Court	Marcia Adams		
1938	The Renegade Ranger	Judith Alvarez		
1939	Homicide Bureau	J.G. Bliss		
1939	The Lone Wolf Spy Hunt	Karen		
1939	Only Angels Have Wings	Judy MacPherson		
1940	Music in My Heart	Patricia O'Malley		
1940	Blondie on a Budget	Joan Forrester		
1940	Susan and God	Leonora Stubbs		
1940	The Lady in Question	Natalie Roguin		
1940	Angels Over Broadway	Nina Barona		
1941	The Strawberry Blonde	Virginia Brush		
1941	Affectionately Yours	Irene Malcolm		
1941	Blood and Sand	Doña Sol		
1941	You'll Never Get Rich	Sheila Winthrop		
1942	My Gal Sal	Sally Elliott		
1942	Tales of Manhattan	Ethel Halloway		
1942	You Were Never Lovelier	Maria Acuña		
1944	Cover Girl	Rusty Parker/Maribelle Hicks		
1945	Tonight and Every Night	Rosalind Bruce		
1946	Gilda	Gilda Mundson Farrell		
1947	Down to Earth	Terpsichore/Kitty Pendleton		
1947	The Lady from Shanghai	Elsa Bannister		
1948	The Loves of Carmen	Carmen	Also producer (uncredited)	
1952	Affair in Trinidad	Chris Emery	Also producer (uncredited)	
1953	Salome	Princess Salome	Alternative title: Salome: The Dance of the Seven Veils; Also producer (uncredited)	
1953	Miss Sadie Thompson	Sadie Thompson		
1957	Fire Down Below	Irena		
1957	Pal Joey	Vera Prentice-Simpson		
1958	Separate Tables	Ann Shankland		
1959	They Came to Cordura	Adelaide Geary		
1959	The Story on Page One	Josephine Brown/Jo Morris		
1961	The Happy Thieves	Eve Lewis	Also executive producer	
1964	Circus World	Lili Alfredo		
1965	The Money Trap	Rosalie Kenny		
1966	The Poppy Is Also a Flower	Monique Marko	Television film	
1967	The Rover	Aunt Caterina	Alternative title: L'avventuriero	
1968	The Bastard	Martha	Alternative title: I bastardi	
1970	Road to Salina	Mara	Alternative title: La route de Salina	
1970	The Naked Zoo	Mrs. Golden		
1971	The Carol Burnett Show	Herself	TV series (Episode #4.20)	
1971	Rowan & Martin's Laugh-In	Herself	TV series (Episode #5.3)	
1972	The Wrath of God	Señora De La Plata		

== Awards ==
In 1999, Hayworth was acknowledged as one of the top-25 greatest female stars of Classic Hollywood cinema in the American Film Institute's survey, AFI's 100 Years...100 Stars.

Year	Organization	Category	Work	Result	Ref.
1948	Golden Apple Award	Least Cooperative Actress	—N/a	Won	
1952	Golden Apple Award	Least Cooperative Actress	—N/a	Won	
1960	Hollywood Walk of Fame	Star - Motion Pictures	—N/a	Honored	
1965	Golden Globe Awards	Best Actress in a Motion Picture – Drama	Circus World	Nominated	
1978	National Film Society	National Screen Heritage Award	—N/a	Honored	

== Legacy ==
The public disclosure and discussion of Hayworth's illness drew international attention to Alzheimer's disease, which was little known at the time, and it helped to greatly increase federal funding for Alzheimer's research.

The Rita Hayworth Gala, a benefit for the Alzheimer's Association, is held annually in Chicago and New York City. The program was founded in 1985 by Yasmin Aga Khan, in honor of her mother. She is the hostess for the events and is a major sponsor of Alzheimer's disease charities and awareness programs. As of August 2017, a total of more than $72 million had been raised through events in Chicago, New York, and Palm Beach, Florida.

On October 17, 2016, a press release from the Springer Associates Public Relations Agency announced that Rita Hayworth's former manager and friend, Budd Burton Moss, initiated a campaign to solicit the United States Postal Service to issue a commemorative stamp featuring Hayworth. Springer Associates also announced that the Academy of Motion Picture Arts and Sciences would be lobbied in hopes of having an honorary Academy Award issued in memory of Hayworth. The press release added that Hayworth's daughter, Yasmin Aga Khan, the Alzheimer's Association of Greater Los Angeles, and numerous prominent personalities of stage and screen were supporting the Moss campaign. The press release stated the target date for fulfillment of the stamp and Academy Award to be on October 17, 2018, the centennial of Hayworth's birth.
