= Antonio Cansino =

Flamenco dancer (1865–1954)

- Born: April 21, 1865; Seville, Spain
- Died: July 20, 1954 (aged 89); Los Angeles County, California, U.S.
- Resting place: Holy Cross Cemetery
- Spouse: Carmen Reina
- Children: 7, including Elisa and Eduardo

Antonio Cansino (April 21, 1865 Paradas, Sevilla – July 20, 1954) was a flamenco dancer and guitarist credited with creating modern-day Spanish dance by combining classical Spanish dance and Romani flamenco. He was popularly known for dancing the bolero. He was the father of Eduardo Cansino and the grandfather of Rita Hayworth, who were both famous dancers and actors, and the great-great-grandfather of footballer Gonzalo García. He is the patriarch of The Dancing Cansinos. He performed for the King of Spain and instructed Rita Hayworth in her first dance lesson.

== Early life ==
Antonio Cansino was born on April 21, 1865, in Paradas, Sevilla, Spain. He operated dance academies in Seville and Madrid.

He married dancer Carmen Reina. The couple had nine children who were all dancers: Eduardo, Jose, Angel, Paco, Antonio Jr., Rafael, Gracia, Carmen y Elisa Cansino. Since all his children were dancers, the family was known as The Dancing Cansinos.

He immigrated to the United States around 1936.

== Death ==
Antonio died at General Hospital due to reoccurring heart failure (aged 88–89). A private Catholic ceremony was held. He was survived by 6 children and 7 grandchildren. He was buried at Holy Cross Cemetery.
