= Eduardo Cansino =

Spanish born American dancer and actor

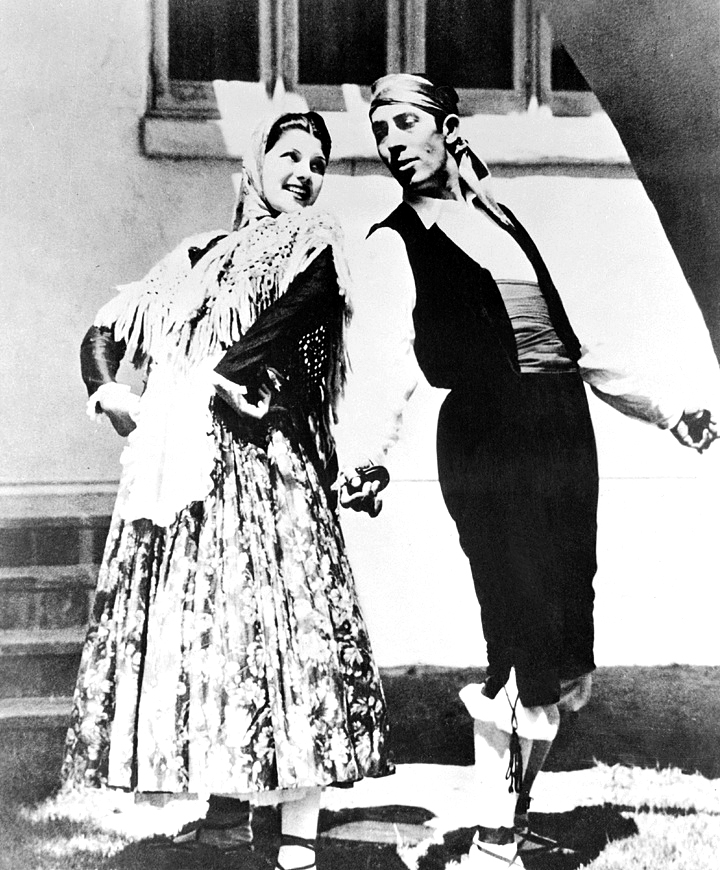
- Eduardo Cansino with daughter and dancing partner Margarita Cansino (Rita Hayworth) (1933)
- Born: Eduardo Cansino Reina; March 2, 1895; Castilleja de la Cuesta, Andalucia, Spain
- Died: December 24, 1968 (aged 73); Pompano Beach, Florida, U.S.
- Occupations: Dancer, actor
- Spouse: Volga Hayworth (m. 1917; died 1945)
- Children: 3, including Rita Hayworth and Vernon Cansino

Eduardo Cansino Reina (March 2, 1895 – December 24, 1968) was a Spanish-born American dancer and actor. He was the father of actress Rita Hayworth.

== Biography ==
Eduardo Cansino was born on March 2, 1895, in Castilleja de la Cuesta, Andalucia, Spain. His sister, Elisa, was also a dancer.

His father, Antonio Cansino, combined classical flamenco dancing with Roma flamenco. Antonio was known worldwide for dancing the bolero.

Eduardo's immigration to the United States was sponsored by the Stuyvesant family. In New York he performed for, instructed, and integrated into high society.

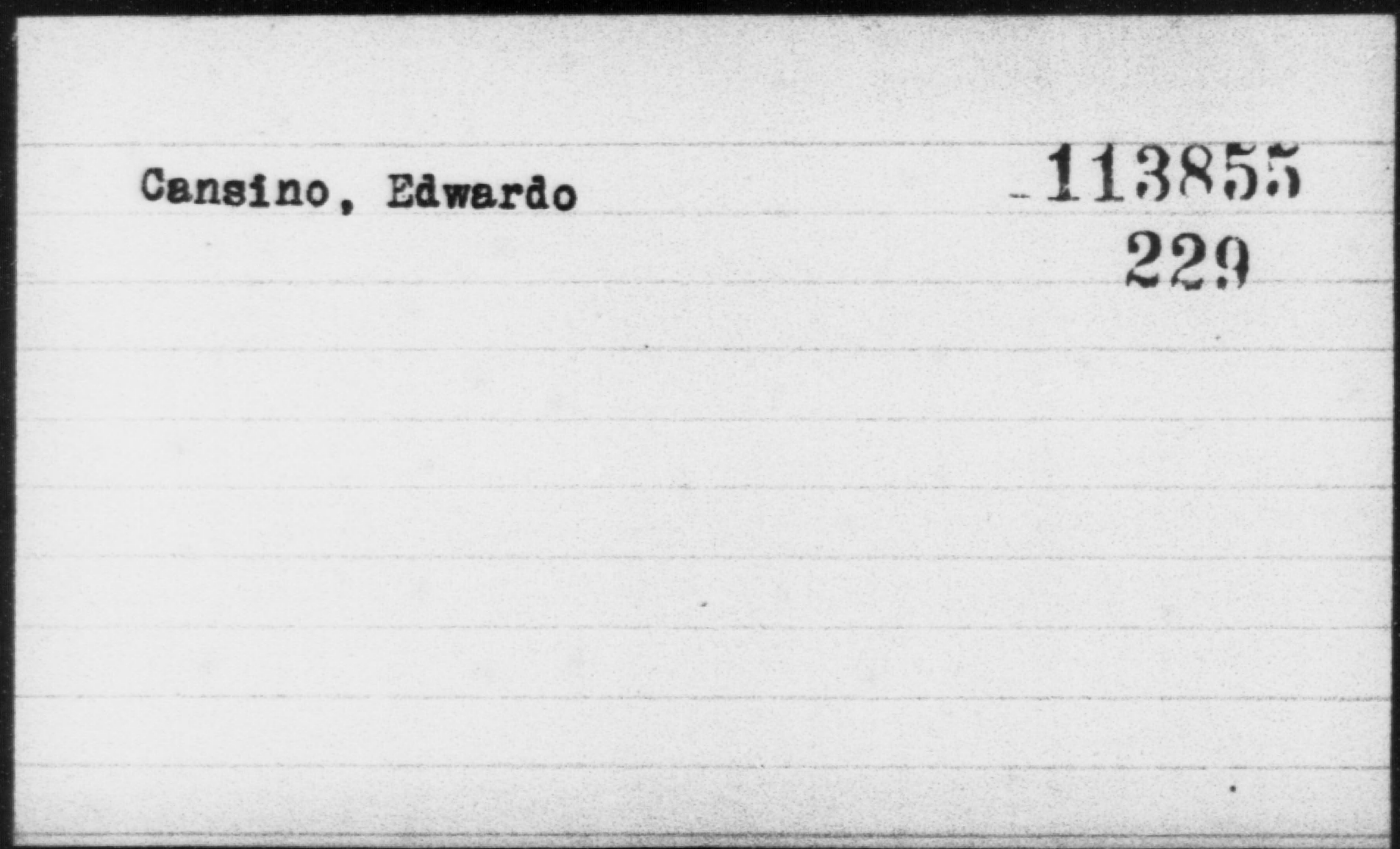
Cansino, Edwardo immigration index card

There, he joined the Ziegfeld Follies where he met Volga Hayworth. They married in 1917. They had three children: Margarita Carmen (October 17, 1918 – May 14, 1987), Eduardo Jr. (October 13, 1919 – March 11, 1974), and Vernon (May 21, 1922 – March 23, 1974). After she began making films in Hollywood, Margarita Carmen Cansino took her mother's maiden name as her professional surname, becoming Rita Hayworth.

== Death ==
Eduardo Cansino Sr. died in Pompano Beach, Florida, in 1968, aged 73, and is buried at Forest Lawn Memorial Park (Glendale).

== Selected filmography ==
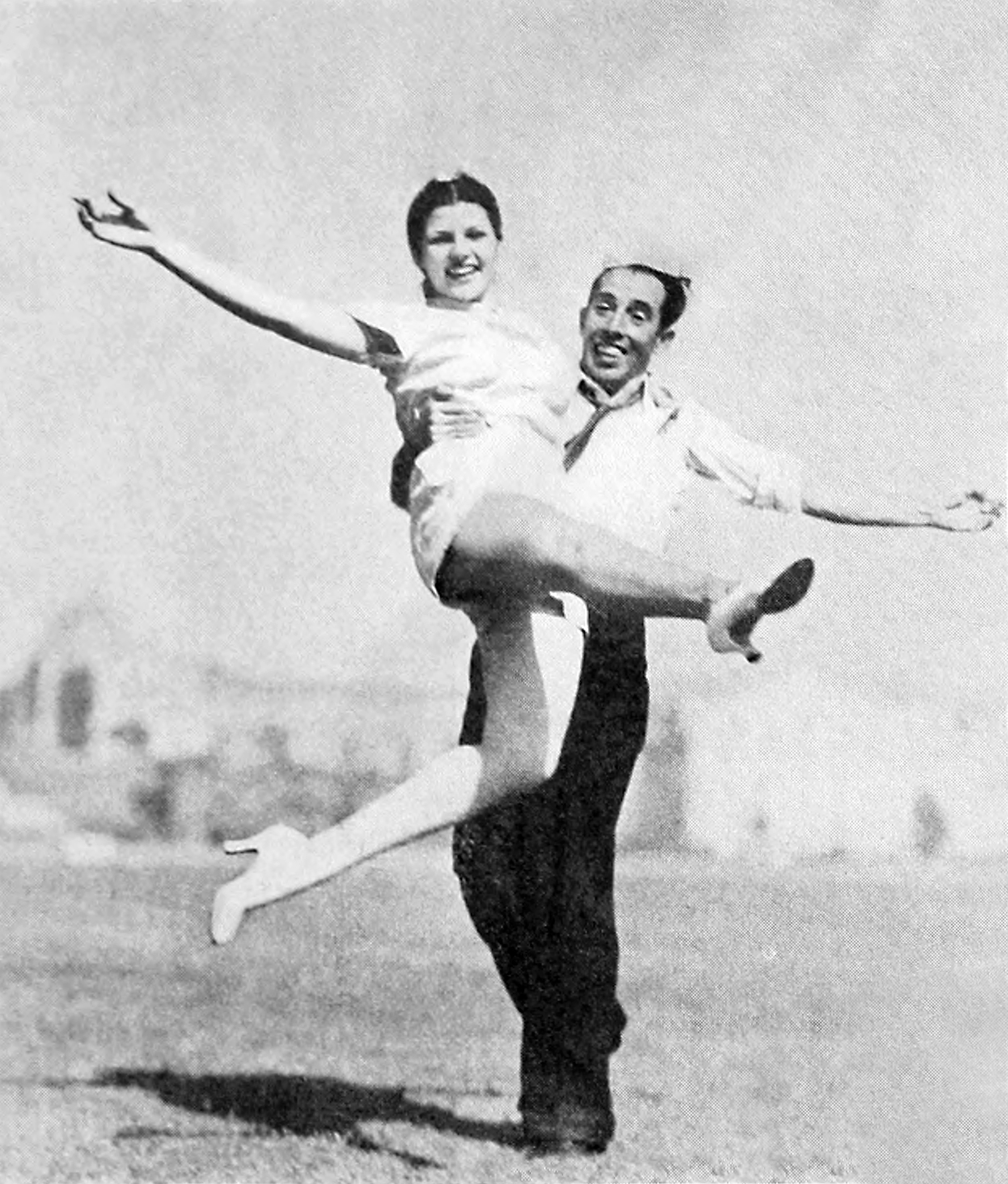
Rita and Eduardo Cansino in 1935

Year	Title	Role	Notes
1926	Hubby's Quiet Little Game	Dancer	uncredited, short film
1926	Masked Mamas	Dancer	uncredited, short film
1930	Golden Dawn	Secondary Supporting Role	uncredited
1936	Dancing Pirate	Specialty Dancer	uncredited
1953	Salome	Roman Guard	uncredited
1953	Sombrero	Man in Cafe	uncredited
1953	Ramar of the Jungle	Sabata's Father	episode: The Voice in the Sky
