= 2021–22 Under 20 Elite League =

European Elite League

Tournament details
- Teams: 8 (from 8 associations)

Tournament statistics
- Matches played: 27
- Goals scored: 81 (3 per match)
- Top scorer(s): (Italy) Edoardo Vergani (5 goals)

The 2021–22 Under 20 Elite League is an age-restricted association football tournament for national Under-20 teams. It is the fourth edition of the Under 20 Elite League.

The tournament was not completed, causing it to be the second consecutive Elite League that failed to be completed. Italy declared themselves as Champions.

== Participating teams ==
- Czech Republic
- England
- Germany
- Italy
- Norway
- Poland
- Portugal
- Romania

== League table ==
Pos	Team	Pld	W	D	L	GF	GA	GD	Pts
1	Italy	7	3	3	1	18	5	+13	12
2	England	6	3	1	2	15	7	+8	10
3	Germany	7	2	4	1	10	6	+4	10
4	Portugal	7	2	3	2	9	6	+3	9
5	Romania	7	3	0	4	8	22	−14	9
6	Poland	7	2	2	3	8	7	+1	8
7	Norway	6	2	2	2	7	14	−7	8
8	Czech Republic	7	2	1	4	6	14	−8	7

== Results ==
2 September 2021

Czech Republic	0–2	Germany
	Report	Asta 70'; Woltemade 75' (pen.)

2 September 2021

Romania	2–1	Portugal
Baiaram 45+1'; Mustacă 70' (pen.)	Report	Agostinho 5'

2 September 2021

Poland	0–2	Italy
	Report	Cortinovis 7'; Oristanio 31'

6 September 2021

Germany	1–1	Norway
Tillman 33'	Report	Aga 74'

6 September 2021

England	6–1	Romania
Mola 15'; McAtee 21'; Gelhardt 53', 80' (pen.); Weir 75'; Rak-Sakyi 90'		Ghindovean 60'

St George's Park, Burton upon Trent
7 September 2021

Portugal	0–0	Poland
	Report

7 October 2021

Portugal	1–2	Norway
Cruz 89'	Report	Nordås 47'; Melkersen 49'

7 October 2021

Romania	2–1	Czech Republic
Giafer 40'; Rădăslăvescu 85'	Report	Krobot 50' (pen.)

7 October 2021

Poland	0–0	Germany
	Report

7 October 2021

England	1–1	Italy
Bate 41'	Report	Maldini 34'

SMH Group Stadium, Chesterfield
Attendance: 6,394
11 October 2021

Norway	1–5	Poland
Aga 12'	Report	Pyrka 19'; Paluszek 27'; Maćkowiak 38'; Piła 47', 66'

11 October 2021

Germany	4–0	Romania
Nebel 60' (pen.); Kehrer 73', 87'; Schmidt 86'	Report

11 October 2021

Czech Republic	0–5	England
	Report	Azeez 15'; Stansfield 49'; Anjorin 70'; Rogers 76'; Hill 83'

Na Stínadlech, Teplice
Attendance: 3,645
12 October 2021

Italy	1–1	Portugal
Tongya 45+1'	Report	Cruz 45+2'

11 November 2021

Italy	1–2	Czech Republic
Moro 36'	Report	Kristan 1'; Novak 13'

11 November 2021

Romania	2–1	Poland
Rădăslăvescu 33'; Mustacă 80'	Report	Struski 45+1' (pen.)

11 November 2021

Portugal	2–0	England
Couto 52'; Cruz 63'	Report

Estádio Dr. Magalhães Pessoa, Leiria
15 November 2021

Italy	7–0	Romania
Vergani 1', 21'; Oristanio 19', 35'; Bove 33', 57'; Milanese 46'

15 November 2021

Portugal	1–1	Germany
Jean-Marie 56'	Report	Lemperle 86'

15 November 2021

Czech Republic	1–1	Norway
Cienciala 63'	Report	Melkersen 12'

24 March 2022

Romania	1–2	Norway
Anton 28'	Report	Nordås 57'; Østrøm 65'

24 March 2022

Italy	1–1	Germany
Vergani 78'	Report	Tauer 55'

24 March 2022

Portugal	3–0	Czech Republic
Brazão 24'; Carvalho 52'; Guedes 90+4'	Report

25 March 2022

Poland	2–0	England
Gołębiowski 55'; Szwedzik 60'	Report

Bielsko-Biała Stadium, Bielsko-Biała
Attendance: 6,148
28 March 2022

Czech Republic	2–0	Poland
Icha 30'; Firbacher 60'	Report

28 March 2022

Norway	0–5	Italy
	Report	Vergani 46', 75'; Sekulov 48'; Oristanio 72'; Leone 90+4'

29 March 2022

England	3–1	Germany
Greenwood 10'; McAtee 50'; Dolan 61'	Report	Samardžić 87'

JobServe Community Stadium, Colchester
Attendance: 8,437

== Goalscorers ==
There have been 81 goals scored in 27 matches, for an average of 3 goals per match (as of 29 March 2022).

5 goals

- (Italy) Edoardo Vergani

4 goals

- (Italy) Gaetano Oristanio

3 goals

- (Portugal) Filipe Cruz

2 goals

- (England) Joe Gelhardt
- (England) James McAtee
- (Germany) Emilio Kehrer
- (Norway) Oscar Aga
- (Norway) Elias Melkersen
- (Norway) Lasse Selvåg Nordås
- (Romania) Robert Mustacă
- (Romania) Eduard Rădăslăvescu

1 goal

- (Czech Republic) Lukáš Cienciala
- (Czech Republic) Filip Firbacher
- (Czech Republic) Marek Icha
- (Czech Republic) Ladislav Krobot
- (England) Tino Anjorin
- (England) Miguel Azeez
- (England) Lewis Bate
- (England) Tyrhys Dolan
- (England) Sam Greenwood
- (England) James Hill
- (England) Clinton Mola
- (Ghana) Jesurun Rak-Sakyi
- (England) Morgan Rogers
- (England) Jay Stansfield
- (England) Jensen Weir
- (Germany) Simon Asta
- (Germany) Tim Lemperle
- (Germany) Paul Nebel
- (Serbia) Lazar Samardžić
- (Germany) Kenneth Schmidt
- (Germany) Niklas Tauer
- (United States) Malik Tillman
- (Germany) Nick Woltemade
- (Italy) Edoardo Bove
- (Italy) Alessandro Cortinovis
- (Italy) Giuseppe Leone
- (Italy) Daniel Maldini
- (Italy) Tommaso Milanese
- (Italy) Luca Moro
- (Italy) Nikola Sekulov
- (Italy) Franco Tongya
- (Norway) Robin Østrøm
- (Poland) Radosław Gołębiowski
- (Poland) Mateusz Maćkowiak
- (Poland) Aleksander Paluszek
- (Poland) Dominik Piła
- (Poland) Arkadiusz Pyrka
- (Poland) Karol Struski
- (Poland) Patryk Szwedzik
- (Portugal) Paulo Agostinho
- (Portugal) Pedro Brazão
- (Portugal) Duarte Carvalho
- (Portugal) Bernardo Couto
- (Portugal) Gui Guedes
- (Portugal) Mathys Jean-Marie
- (Romania) Andrei Anton
- (Romania) Ștefan Baiaram
- (Romania) Darius Ghindovean
- (Romania) Deniz Giafer
