= 2022–23 Under 20 Elite League =

European Elite League

Tournament details
- Teams: 8 (from 8 associations)

Final positions
- Champions: Italy
- Runners-up: Germany
- Third place: Czech Republic
- Fourth place: Poland

Tournament statistics
- Matches played: 19
- Goals scored: 49 (2.58 per match)
- Top scorer(s): (Kosovo) Fisnik Asllani (Italy) Giuseppe Ambrosino (3 goals each)

The 2022–23 Under 20 Elite League was an age-restricted association football tournament for national Under-20 teams. It was the fifth edition of the Under 20 Elite League.

== Participating teams ==
- Czech Republic
- England
- Germany
- Italy
- Norway
- Poland
- Portugal
- Romania

== League table ==
Pos	Team	Pld	W	D	L	GF	GA	GD	Pts
1	Italy	6	3	2	1	9	7	+2	11
2	Germany	7	3	2	2	8	8	0	11
3	Czech Republic	5	3	1	1	9	5	+4	10
4	Poland	5	2	0	3	5	6	−1	6
5	Norway	3	1	1	1	7	4	+3	4
6	Romania	6	1	1	4	5	10	−5	4
7	Portugal	5	1	1	3	4	9	−5	4
8	England	1	1	0	0	2	0	+2	3

== Matches ==
7 June 2022

Italy	0–1	Poland
	Report	Tkocz 90'

22 September 2022

Czech Republic	2–1	Romania
Vecheta 22', 58'	Report	Andronache 78'

22 September 2022

Germany	2–1	Poland
Asllani 84'; Çalhanoğlu 87'	Report	Schmidt 25' (o.g.)

23 September 2022

Portugal	1–2	Italy
Veiga 78' (pen.)	Report	Casadei 17'; Volpato 65'

26 September 2022

Romania	0–1	Germany
		Wagner 73'

26 September 2022

Norway	P–P	Czech Republic

27 September 2022

Poland	3–1	Portugal
Biegański 10'; Karasek 24'; Kasperowicz 35'		Gomes 12'

16 November 2022

Czech Republic	2–2	Germany
Višinský 33'; Svoboda 86'	Report	Nebel 2'; Woltemade 34'

17 November 2022

Romania	1–2	Italy
Stoica 63' (pen.)	Report	Fabbian 34'; Ambrosino 50'

19 November 2022

Germany	2–1	Norway
Asllani 36', 68'	Report	Williamsen 7'

21 November 2022

Italy	2–1	Czech Republic
Ambrosino 15'; Cassano 88'		Jurásek 66'

21 November 2022

Romania	2–0	Poland
Stoica 16'; Buta 55'

22 November 2022

Germany	0–1	Portugal
	Report	Cabral 86'

22 March 2023

England	2–0	Germany
Iling-Junior 35', 58'

Joie Stadium, Manchester
Attendance: 2,205
23 March 2023

Portugal	1–1	Romania
Santos 60'		Mogoș 87'

23 March 2023

Norway	2–2	Italy
Nordås 13' (pen.); Mvuka 62'		Nasti 18'; Ndour 55'

24 March 2023

Poland	0–1	Czech Republic
		Alijagić 21'

27 March 2023

Italy	1–1	Germany
Ambrosino 65'		Sieb 60'

27 March 2023

Norway	4–0	Romania
Jatta 3', 12'; Nordås 14'; Dahl 89'

28 March 2023

Czech Republic	3–0	Portugal
Šigut 11'; Matys 28'; Horský 62'

== Goalscorers ==
There have been 49 goals scored in 19 matches, for an average of 2.58 goals per match (as of 28 March 2023).

3 goals

- (Kosovo) Fisnik Asllani
- (Italy) Giuseppe Ambrosino

2 goals

- (Czech Republic) Filip Vecheta
- (England) Samuel Iling-Junior
- (Norway) Seedy Jatta
- (Norway) Lasse Selvåg Nordås
- (Romania) Ianis Stoica

1 goal

- (Czech Republic) Denis Alijagić
- (Czech Republic) Filip Horský
- (Czech Republic) Matěj Jurásek
- (Czech Republic) František Matys
- (Czech Republic) Samuel Šigut
- (Czech Republic) Antonín Svoboda
- (Czech Republic) Denis Višinský
- (Germany) Kerim Çalhanoğlu
- (Germany) Paul Nebel
- (Germany) Armindo Sieb
- (Germany) Robert Wagner
- (Germany) Nick Woltemade
- (Italy) Cesare Casadei
- (Italy) Claudio Cassano
- (Italy) Giovanni Fabbian
- (Italy) Marco Nasti
- (Italy) Cher Ndour
- (Australia) Cristian Volpato
- (Norway) Petter Dahl
- (Norway) Joel Mvuka
- (Norway) Max Normann Williamsen
- (Poland) Jan Biegański
- (Poland) Kacper Karasek
- (Poland) Kacper Kasperowicz
- (Poland) Maksymilian Tkocz
- (Portugal) Diogo Cabral
- (Portugal) Rodrigo Gomes
- (Portugal) Pedro Santos
- (Portugal) Renato Veiga
- (Romania) Luca Andronache
- (Romania) Gabriel Buta
- (Romania) Alexandru Mogoș

1 own goal

- (Germany) Kenneth Schmidt (against Poland)
