= 2024–25 Under 20 Elite League =

European Elite League

Tournament details
- Teams: 8 (from 8 associations)

Final positions
- Champions: Germany
- Runners-up: England
- Third place: Italy
- Fourth place: Portugal

Tournament statistics
- Top scorer: (England) Max Dean (4 goals)

The 2024–25 Under 20 Elite League was an age-restricted association football tournament for national under-20 teams. It was the 7th edition of the Under 20 Elite League.

== Participating teams ==
- Czech Republic
- England
- Germany
- Italy
- Poland
- Portugal
- Romania
- Turkey

== League table ==
Standings
| Pos | Team | Pld | W | D | L | GF | GA | GD | Pts |
|---|---|---|---|---|---|---|---|---|---|
| 1 | Germany U20 | 7 | 5 | 1 | 1 | 13 | 8 | +5 | 16 |
| 2 | England U20 | 7 | 4 | 3 | 0 | 14 | 4 | +10 | 15 |
| 3 | Italy U20 | 7 | 4 | 1 | 2 | 14 | 10 | +4 | 13 |
| 4 | Portugal U20 | 7 | 2 | 5 | 0 | 9 | 7 | +2 | 11 |
| 5 | Poland U20 | 7 | 2 | 1 | 4 | 11 | 13 | –2 | 7 |
| 6 | Romania U20 | 7 | 2 | 1 | 4 | 8 | 12 | –4 | 7 |
| 7 | (Czech Republic) Czechia U20 | 7 | 1 | 2 | 4 | 4 | 9 | –5 | 5 |
| 8 | Turkey U20 | 7 | 0 | 2 | 5 | 5 | 15 | –10 | 2 |

== Matches ==
| Date | Home team | Score | Away team |
|---|---|---|---|
| 5 September 2024 | Romania U20 | 2–3 | Germany U20 |
| 6 September 2024 | (Czech Republic) Czechia U20 | 1–2 | Italy U20 |
| 6 September 2024 | Turkey U20 | 1–1 | England U20 |
| 9 September 2024 | Portugal U20 | 2–1 | Poland U20 |
| 10 September 2024 | Italy U20 | 0–3 | Germany U20 |
| 10 September 2024 | (Czech Republic) Czechia U20 | 0–0 | Turkey U20 |
| 10 September 2024 | England U20 | 2–0 | Romania U20 |
| 10 October 2024 | Italy U20 | 1–2 | England U20 |
| 10 October 2024 | (Czech Republic) Czechia U20 | 0–1 | Romania U20 |
| 10 October 2024 | Turkey U20 | 1–2 | Portugal U20 |
| 11 October 2024 | Germany U20 | 3–1 | Poland U20 |
| 14 October 2024 | Portugal U20 | 1–1 | Italy U20 |
| 14 October 2024 | England U20 | 3–0 | (Czech Republic) Czechia U20 |
| 15 October 2024 | Poland U20 | 4–2 | Turkey U20 |
| 14 November 2024 | Romania U20 | 1–1 | Portugal U20 |
| 15 November 2024 | Poland U20 | 2–3 | Italy U20 |
| 15 November 2024 | England U20 | 4–0 | Germany U20 |
| 18 November 2024 | Portugal U20 | 1–1 | (Czech Republic) Czechia U20 |
| 19 November 2024 | Italy U20 | 4–1 | Romania U20 |
| 19 November 2024 | Poland U20 | 1–1 | England U20 |
| 19 November 2024 | Turkey U20 | 0–2 | Germany U20 |
| 20 March 2025 | Turkey U20 | 0–3 | Italy U20 |
| 21 March 2025 | (Czech Republic) Czechia U20 | 0–1 | Germany U20 |
| 21 March 2025 | Portugal U20 | 1–1 | England U20 |
| 21 March 2025 | Poland U20 | 1–0 | Romania U20 |
| 24 March 2025 | Germany U20 | 1–1 | Portugal U20 |
| 25 March 2025 | Romania U20 | 3–1 | Turkey U20 |
| 25 March 2025 | Poland U20 | 1–2 | (Czech Republic) Czechia U20 |
