= Under-20 Four Nations Tournament =

- Organiser(s): Self-governing tournament
- Founded: 2001
- Abolished: 2017
- Region: Europe
- Teams: 4
- Related competitions: Under 20 Elite League
- Last champions: Poland
- Most championships: Germany (9 titles)

Under-20 Four Nations Tournament (Italian: Torneo Quattro Nazioni Under-20; German: Internationale U-20-Spielrunde) was an annual under-20 football tournament, contested by the four Alpine nations: Austria, Germany, Italy and Switzerland, from the 2003–04 edition until the 2009–10 edition. In 2011, Poland replaced Austria. For the 2017–18 edition, the tournament was replaced by the Under 20 Elite League, as the 2017–18 Under 20 Elite League.

== Format ==
The 4 teams played in home-and-away round-robin format.

In 2012–13 season, the age limit was: players born on or after 1 January 1993 were eligible. In other words, players eligible to 2011–12 season U19 team competition of UEFA were eligible to the U20 event in 2012–13. Moreover, teams could select up to 8 overage players born on or after 1 January 1992. Combining two criteria, only those players were allowed to play in 2015 UEFA European Under-21 Football Championship.

== Results ==
=== 2001–02 ===
Team	Pld	W	D	L	GF	GA	GD	Pts
Italy	6	3	2	1	12	3	+9	11
Netherlands	6	2	2	2	6	6	0	8
Germany	6	2	1	3	7	10	−3	7
Switzerland	6	2	1	3	7	13	−6	7

=== 2002–03 ===
Team	Pld	W	D	L	GF	GA	GD	Pts
Italy	6	6	0	0	25	7	+18	18
Switzerland	6	2	2	2	7	14	−7	8
England	6	2	1	3	8	13	−5	7
Germany	6	0	1	5	8	14	−6	1

=== 2003–04 ===
Team	Pld	W	D	L	GF	GA	GD	Pts
Germany	6	4	1	1	10	6	+4	13
Switzerland	6	2	3	1	8	8	0	9
Austria	6	1	2	3	4	6	−2	5
Italy	6	1	2	3	6	8	−2	5

=== 2004–05 ===
Team	Pld	W	D	L	GF	GA	GD	Pts
Germany	6	4	2	0	9	2	+7	14
Switzerland	6	3	1	2	8	10	−2	10
Italy	6	1	2	3	4	7	−3	5
Austria	6	1	1	4	5	7	−2	4

=== 2005–06 ===
Team	Pld	W	D	L	GF	GA	GD	Pts
Italy	6	4	1	1	10	3	+7	13
Austria	6	3	0	3	11	10	+1	9
Switzerland	6	2	1	3	7	12	−5	7
Germany	6	1	2	3	8	11	−3	5

=== 2006–07 ===
Team	Pld	W	D	L	GF	GA	GD	Pts
Germany	6	4	1	1	14	4	+10	13
Italy	5	3	1	1	6	4	+2	10
Austria	6	2	0	4	10	16	−6	6
Switzerland	5	1	0	4	3	9	−6	3

=== 2007–08 ===
Team	Pld	W	D	L	GF	GA	GD	Pts
Germany	6	3	2	1	7	4	+3	11
Italy	6	2	2	2	4	2	+2	8
Austria	6	2	2	2	3	4	−1	8
Switzerland	6	1	2	3	4	8	−4	5

=== 2008–09 ===
Team	Pld	W	D	L	GF	GA	GD	Pts
Switzerland	6	4	1	1	12	6	+6	13
Germany	6	4	0	2	14	8	+6	12
Austria	6	2	1	3	9	11	−2	7
Italy	6	0	2	4	5	15	−10	2

=== 2009–10 ===
Team	Pld	W	D	L	GF	GA	GD	Pts
Austria	6	3	2	1	11	9	+2	11
Germany	6	2	2	2	13	10	+3	8
Switzerland	6	2	2	2	13	12	+1	8
Italy	6	2	0	4	9	15	−6	6

12 August 2009

Austria	1–5	Switzerland
		Schönbächler 15', 42' (pen.); Berisha 59'; Avanzini 75'; Abegglen 83'

Stegersbach, Austria

4 September 2009

Austria	3–0 (w/o)	Germany

8 September 2009

Switzerland	1–1	Austria
Mustafi 32'

Kleine Allmend, Frauenfeld, Switzerland
Attendance: 740
Referee: (Germany) Markus Wingenbach

9 October 2009

Switzerland	3–2	Germany (B team)
Abegglen 23'; Unal 35', 90+2'	Report,	Yalçın 45'; Beister 76'

Stadion FC Solothurn, Solothurn, Switzerland
Attendance: 600
Referee: (Italy) Carmine Russo

13 November 2009

Germany	2–2	Austria
Moritz 30'; Beister 41'	Report	Kaufmann 9'; Prutsch 88'

Hoffenheim, Germany
Referee: (Switzerland) Alain Bieri

17 November 2009

Austria	1–0	Italy
Sen 35'

Gleisdorf, Austria

8 December 2009

Italy	1–4	Germany
Caturano 85'	Report	Beister 14'; Bigalke 18'; Schürrle 55'; Bäcker 82'

Stadio Erasmo Iacovone, Taranto, Italy
Referee: (Austria) Drachter

3 March 2010

Germany	1–1	Switzerland
		Mustafi 60'

Stadion Alte Försterei, Berlin, Germany
Attendance: 1723
Referee: (Austria) Christian Dintar
3 March 2010

Italy	1–3	Austria
Bonaventura 55'		Freudenthaler 4', 22'; Gravogl 34'

Stadio Rino Mercante, Bassano del Grappa, Italy

7 April 2010

Germany	4–0	Italy
Latza 9', 11'; Beister 42'; Bäcker 90'

Millerntorstadion, Hamburg

28 April 2010
19:00

Switzerland	2–3	Italy
Prijović 19'; Avanzini 71'		Carbonaro 33'; Della Penna 52', 70'

Stade Universitaire St-Leonard-Fribourg, Fribourg
Attendance: 2,000
Referee: (Germany) Tobias Stieler

13 May 2010

Italy	4–1	Switzerland
	Report	Stéphane Garcia 92'

Fontanafredda, Italy
Attendance: 3,000
Referee: (Austria) Harkam

=== 2010–11 ===
Team	Pld	W	D	L	GF	GA	GD	Pts
Germany	6	5	1	0	12	5	+7	16
Poland	6	2	1	3	5	8	−3	7
Italy	6	2	0	4	6	7	−1	6
Switzerland	6	2	0	4	8	11	−3	6

=== 2011–12 ===
Team	Pld	W	D	L	GF	GA	GD	Pts
Germany	6	4	0	2	16	11	+5	12
Italy	6	3	1	2	14	12	+2	10
Switzerland	6	2	1	3	8	11	−3	7
Poland	6	2	0	4	7	11	−4	6

=== 2012–13 ===
Team	Pld	W	D	L	GF	GA	GD	Pts
Germany	6	4	1	1	14	8	+6	13
Italy	6	4	0	2	16	9	+7	12
Poland	6	2	2	2	10	15	−5	8
Switzerland	6	0	1	5	7	15	−8	1

=== 2013–14 ===
Team	Pld	W	D	L	GF	GA	GD	Pts
Germany	6	3	1	2	7	7	0	10
Italy	6	2	3	1	11	6	+5	9
Poland	6	3	0	3	7	7	0	9
Switzerland	6	1	2	3	8	13	−5	5

=== 2014–15 ===
Tournament period: 3 September 2014 – 21 April 2015

Team	Pld	W	D	L	GF	GA	GD	Pts
Poland	6	4	1	1	10	7	+3	13
Italy	6	4	0	2	9	6	+3	12
Germany	6	1	2	3	5	6	−1	5
Switzerland	6	0	3	3	3	8	−5	3

3 September 2014
18:00

Germany	0–1	Italy
		Garritano 56'

Waldstadion, Spiesen-Elversberg
Attendance: 7,000
Referee: (Germany) Patrick Alt

4 September 2014

Poland	1–1	Switzerland
Wroński 73'	Report	Corbaz 10'

GOSiR Komorniki, Plewiska
Attendance: 1,000
Referee: (Germany) Robert Kempter

7 September 2014
15:00

Switzerland	0–0	Germany
	Report

GC/Campus, Niederhasli
Attendance: 1050

9 September 2014
15:00

Italy	1–3	Poland
Garritano 18'	Report	Frankowski 6'; Straus 29'; Dźwigała 86'

Stadio Degli Ulivi, Andria
Attendance: 500
Referee: (Switzerland) Luca Gut

9 October 2014
18:30

Poland	2–1	Italy
Stępiński 3'; Frankowski 84'	Report	Manconi 49'

Arena Lublin, Lublin
Attendance: 13,850
Referee: (Germany) Benjamin Kortus

13 October 2014
18:00

Switzerland	1–2	Poland
Tarashaj 29'	Report	Stępiński 36' (pen.), 76'

Stade de la Fontenette, Carouge

14 November 2014
18:00

Germany	1–1	Switzerland
Selke 54'	Report	Frey 20'

Karl-Liebknecht-Stadion, Potsdam
Attendance: 2,616
Referee: (Italy) Irrati Massimiliano

18 November 2014
17:00

Poland	0–2	Germany
	Report	Selke 5'; Kerk 53' (pen.)

Stadion Florian Krygier, Szczecin
Referee: (Switzerland) Sandro Schärer

26 March 2015
15:00

Italy	3–0	Switzerland
Rosseti 7'; Cristante 69'; Garritano 85' (pen.)	Report

Stadio Rigamonti-Ceppi, Lecco
Attendance: 900
Referee: (Germany) Ittrich Patrick

27 March 2015
14:00

Germany	1–2	Poland
Stendera 77' (pen.)	Report	Stępiński 69'; Zieliński 74'

Ernst-Abbe-Sportfeld, Jena
Referee: (Italy) Dino Tommasi

31 March 2015
20:15

Switzerland	0–1	Italy
	Report	Emmanuello 87'

Cornaredo Stadium, Lugano
Attendance: 2300
Referee: (Poland) Tomasz Kwiatkowski

21 April 2015
15:00

Italy	2–1	Germany
Garritano 10'; Gagliardini 51'		Mukhtar 31'

Stadio Matusa, Frosinone
Attendance: 1,000
Referee: (Poland) Krzysztof Jakubik

==== Additional games ====
Team	Pld	W	D	L	GF	GA	GD	Pts
England	3	2	1	0	5	3	+2	7
Germany	3	1	1	1	2	2	0	4
Netherlands	3	0	2	1	5	6	−1	2
Turkey	3	0	2	1	3	4	−1	2

9 October 2014

Germany	0–1	England
		Süle 34' (o.g.)

9 October 2014

Netherlands	2–2	Turkey
van Overbeek 37'; Janssen 79' (pen.)		Cenk Şahin 43'; Berat Tosun 57'

Sportpark de Bosk, Harkema
Referee: Allard Lindhout

11 October 2014

Germany	1–0	Turkey
Mukhtar 61'

11 October 2014

Netherlands	2–3	England
de Wijs 15'; Vloet 81' (pen.)		Long 45+1'; Chuba 90', 90+2'

13 October 2014

Germany	1–1	Netherlands
Weigl 23'		Janssen 72'

13 October 2014

England	1–1	Turkey
Hause 21'		Tosun 51'

=== 2015–16 ===
Pos	Team	Pld	W	D	L	GF	GA	GD	Pts	Qualification
1	Italy	6	2	3	1	8	4	+4	9	Winner
2	Switzerland	6	1	5	0	8	7	+1	8	
3	Germany	6	1	3	2	4	6	−2	6	
4	Poland	6	1	3	2	8	11	−3	6	

3 September 2015
16:00 CEST

Italy	0–2	Germany
		Stefaniak 23'; Eggestein 71'

Stadio Porta Elisa, Lucca
Referee: Pascal Erlachner (Switzerland)

7 September 2015
18:00 CEST

Switzerland	0–1	Poland
	Report; Report	Makowski 12'

Stade des Arberes, Meyrin
Attendance: 640
Referee: Martin Thomsen (Germany)

7 September 2015
17:00 CEST

Poland	2–1	Germany
Makowski 12'; Piątek 41'	Report; Report	Stolze 23' (pen.)

Stadion OSiR, Włocławek
Attendance: 2,000
Referee: Luca Gut (Switzerland)

8 September 2015

Switzerland	0–0	Italy

7 October 2015
15:00 CEST

Italy	2–2	Poland
Gatto 18'; Aramu 67' (pen.)	Report	Zając 35'; Smuczyński 84'

Stadio Giovanni Chiggiato, Caorle
Referee: Lukas Fahndrich (Switzerland)

11 October 2015
13:00 CEST

Poland	2–3	Switzerland
Nalepa 39'; Angielski 46'	Report	Grgic 20', 60'; Elvedi 80'

Stadion MOSiR, Łódź
Referee: Angelo Cervellera (Italy)

12 November 2015

Germany	0–2	Italy

16 November 2015
18:00 CET

Germany	0–0	Poland
	Report; Report

Preußenstadion, Münster
Attendance: 6,219
Referee: Michael Fabbri (Italy)

17 November 2015

Italy	1–1	Switzerland

23 March 2016
17:00 CET

Poland	0–3	Italy
	Report	Palazzi 16'; Rocca 55'; Gasbarro 85'

Stadion Miejski im. Floriana Krygiera, Szczecin
Referee: Robert Schröder (Germany)

23 March 2016

Germany	1–1	Switzerland

26 March 2016

Switzerland	1–1	Germany

=== 2016–17 ===
Pos	Team	Pld	W	D	L	GF	GA	GD	Pts	Qualification
1	Poland	6	3	1	2	10	10	0	10	Winner
2	Germany	6	3	0	3	7	6	+1	9	
3	Italy	6	3	0	3	8	8	0	9	
4	Switzerland	6	2	1	3	8	9	−1	7	

Updated to match(es) played on 28 March 2017. Source: 90minut
1 September 2016

Germany	0–1	Italy

1 September 2016
18:00 CEST

Switzerland	2–2	Poland
Sow 78' (pen.); Schattin 90'	Report	Zawada 20'; Michalak 62'

Stade Eugène Parlier, Chailly-Montreux
Referee: Claudio Gavillucci (Italy)

6 September 2016
17:00 CEST

Poland	3–0	Germany
Zawada 27'; Jagiełło 45'; Kozak 90'	Report

Stadion Miejski, Świnoujście
Referee: Pascal Erlachner (Switzerland)

6 October 2016
15:00 CEST

Italy	3–0	Poland
Orsolini 14'; Dimarco 36', 44' (pen.)	Report

Stadio Città di Gorgonzola, Gorgonzola
Attendance: 400
Referee: Arne Aarnink (Germany)

11 October 2016

Italy	2–4	Switzerland

10 November 2016

Italy	0–1	Germany

10 November 2016
17:00 CET

Poland	2–0	Switzerland
Bochniewicz 25'; Wieteska 59'	Report

Stadion KS Polkowice, Polkowice
Referee: Fabio Maresca (Italy)

14 November 2016
18:00 CET

Germany	4–0	Poland
Gimber 43'; Ochs 45'; Mittelstädt 66'; Reese 88'	Report

Stadion Zwickau, Zwickau
Attendance: 3,477
Referee: Lukas Fähndrich (Switzerland)

15 November 2016

Switzerland	0–1	Italy

23 March 2017
12:00 CET

Poland	3–1	Italy
Michalak 70'; Angielski 74'; Tomasiewicz 76'	Report	Orsolini 52' (pen.)

Stadion MOSiR, Piła
Referee: Sören Storks (Germany)

23 March 2017
18:00 CET

Germany	1–0	Switzerland
Reese 64'

Waldstadion an der Kaiserlinde
Attendance: 3,385
Referee: Luca Pairetto (Italy)

28 March 2017
18:00 CET

Switzerland	2–1	Germany
J. Oliveira 16', 63'		Ferati 79'

Gurzelen Stadion
Attendance: 654
Referee: Tomasz Kwiatkowski (Poland)

== Performances by countries ==
Pos.	Squadra	Winners	Runners-up	Third place	Fourth place
1	Germany	9	3	2	3
2	Italy	4	6	3	3
3	Poland	2	2	1	1
4	Switzerland	1	3	4	8
5	Austria	1	1	4	1
6	Netherlands	0	1	0	0
