= 2017–18 Under 20 Elite League =

Elite League

Tournament details
- Dates: August 2017 – March 2018
- Teams: 8 (from 8 associations)

Final positions
- Champions: Germany (1st title)
- Runners-up: England
- Third place: Czech Republic
- Fourth place: Italy

Tournament statistics
- Matches played: 28
- Goals scored: 82 (2.93 per match)
- Top scorer(s): (Germany) Robin Hack (4 goals)

The 2017–18 Under 20 Elite League was a football tournament for national under-20 football teams. It was the first edition of the Under 20 Elite League tournament.

The tournament was announced by the German Football Association (DFB) on 23 January 2017 as an expansion of the Under-20 Four Nations Tournament. DFB's Sporting Director Horst Hrubesch described the formation of the competition as an "important step" in player development and hoped to encourage the public to take an interest in U-20 games. Each participating team played seven games on FIFA International Match Calendar.

The tournament was age restricted and only players born on or after 1 January 1997 were eligible.

== Participating teams ==
- Czech Republic
- England
- Germany
- Italy
- Netherlands
- Poland
- Portugal
- Switzerland

== League table ==
Pos	Team	Pld	W	D	L	GF	GA	GD	Pts
1	Germany (C)	7	5	2	0	13	6	+7	17
2	England	7	5	1	1	17	3	+14	16
3	Czech Republic	7	4	2	1	16	11	+5	14
4	Italy	7	2	1	4	14	16	−2	7
5	Portugal	7	2	1	4	7	12	−5	7
6	Switzerland	7	1	3	3	6	10	−4	6
7	Netherlands	7	2	0	5	3	9	−6	6
8	Poland	7	1	2	4	6	15	−9	5

Source: Standings
(C) Champions

== Matches ==
31 August 2017

Poland	0–0	Switzerland
	Report

Stadion Miejski, Rzeszów
Referee: Jan Machálek (Czech Republic)

31 August 2017

England	3–0	Netherlands
Edwards 27'; Mavididi 70'; Johnson 75'	Report

New Bucks Head, Telford
Attendance: 2,321
Referee: Daniel Schlager (Germany)

31 August 2017

Portugal	0–3	Czech Republic
	Report	Turyna 17', 58'; Hlavatý 42'

Estádio Municipal de Abrantes, Abrantes
Referee: Pascal Erlachner (Switzerland)

4 September 2017

Czech Republic	2–2	Germany
Turyna 80'; Hlavatý 90+3'	Report	Štěpánek 45+1' (o.g.); Hack 75'

Stadion Juliska, Prague
Referee: Piotr Lasyk (Poland)

4 September 2017

Switzerland	0–0	England

Stadion Schützenwiese, Winterthur
Referee: Maurizio Mariani (Italy)

4 September 2017

Netherlands	1–0	Portugal
de Wit 34' (pen.)	Report

Sportpark Middelmors, Sassenheim
Referee: Peter Bankes (England)

5 September 2017

Italy	6–1	Poland
Bonazzoli 6', 39'; Castrovilli 23'; Castrovilli 68'; Picchi 80'; Lo Faso 87'	Report	Schikowski 9'

Stadio Comunale Romeo Galli, Imola
Referee: Jochem Kamphuis (Netherlands)

5 October 2017

Italy	1–5	England
Panico 14'	Report	Buckley-Ricketts 5', 35'; Edwards 22'; Suliman 63'; Ugbo 65' (pen.)

Stadio Città di Gorgonzola, Gorgonzola
Referee: João Carlos dos Santos Capela (Portugal)

5 October 2017

Netherlands	0–1	Germany
	Report	Sağlam 24' (pen.)

Sportpark De Boshoek, Hardenberg
Referee: Simon Hooper (England)

5 October 2017

Switzerland	1–1	Portugal
Oliveira 53'	Report	Miguel Luís 90'

Stade des Arbères, Meyrin
Referee: Michael Fabbri (Italy)

6 October 2017

Czech Republic	3–3	Poland
Ladra 31'; Hašek 33', 64'	Report	Mandrysz 43'; Jagiełło 79', 82' (pen.)

Atletický stadion Vejsplachy, Vrchlabí
Referee: Moritz Schneider (Germany)

9 October 2017

Poland	1–0	Netherlands
Siemaszko 51'	Report

Dyskobolia Stadium, Grodzisk Wielkopolski
Referee: Lionel Tschudi (Switzerland)

9 October 2017

Germany	2–1	Switzerland
Löwen 10'; Sağlam 53' (pen.)	Report	Manzambi 87' (pen.)

Edmund-Plambeck-Stadion, Norderstedt
Referee: Jiří Houdek (Czech Republic)

10 October 2017

England	4–0	Czech Republic
Johnson 17'; Mavididi 25' (pen.); Barnes 36'	Report

St George's Park, Burton upon Trent
Referee: Łukasz Szczech (Poland)

10 October 2017

Portugal	4–2	Italy
Bruno Jordão 25'; André Vidigal 42'; Mesaque Djú 67', 75'	Report	Vitale 45+1'; Ghiglione 76'

Estádio Municipal de Portimão, Portimão
Referee: Jeroen Manschot (Netherlands)

9 November 2017

Poland	1–2	Portugal
Żebrakowski 47'	Report	André Vidigal 28'; Tiago Dias 77'

Stadion Miejski, Kluczbork
Referee: Ondřej Ginzel (Czech Republic)

9 November 2017

Netherlands	1–0	Switzerland
Sierhuis 62'	Report

Sportpark Parkzicht, Uden
Referee: (Germany)

9 November 2017

Germany	2–2	Italy
Friede 28'; Hack 40'	Report	Edera 4', 63'

community4you ARENA, Chemnitz
Referee: João Pinheiro (Portugal)

13 November 2017

Switzerland	1–4	Czech Republic
Schättin 35'		Blecha 11', 51'; Vodháněl 15'; Pulkrab 80'

Referee: (Italy)

14 November 2017

Germany	2–1	England
Eggestein 10', 32'		Barnes 86'

Stadion Zwickau
Attendance: 3,720
Referee: Marco Di Bello (Italy)

14 November 2017

Italy	1–0	Netherlands
Pessina 41'

Stadio Guido Teghil
Referee: Andrew Madley (England)

22 March 2018

Portugal	0–1	Germany
	Report	Hack 77'

Estádio Municipal Sérgio Conceição, Coimbra
Referee: Piotr Lasyk (Poland)

22 March 2018

Poland	0–1	England
	Report	Davis 89'

Stadion Miejski, Bielsko-Biała
Attendance: 13,745
Referee: Maurizio Mariani (Italy)

22 March 2018

Czech Republic	1–0	Italy
Chaluš 90+1'

Stadion Luční Ulice, Plzeň
Referee: Florian Badstübner (Germany)

27 March 2018

Germany	3–0	Poland
Hack 22'; Jończy 68' (o.g.); Kammerbauer 78'	Report

Energieversum Stadion, Gütersloh
Referee: Tim Robinson (England)

27 March 2018

England	3–0	Portugal
Willock 15'; Davis 41'; Suliman 66'	Report

Academy Stadium, Manchester
Attendance: 841
Referee: Siemen Mulder (Netherlands)

27 March 2018

Italy	2–3	Switzerland
Marchizza 22' (pen.); Bonazzoli 37'	Report	Vargas 15'; Pickel 41'; Schmid 62' (pen.)

Stadio Giuseppe Moccagatta, Alessandria
Referee: Luís Miguel Branco Godinho (Portugal)

27 March 2018

Netherlands	1–3	Czech Republic
Dilrosun 27'	Report	Kuchta 6', 15'; Janošek 89'

KNVB Campus, Zeist
Referee: David Schärli (Switzerland)
