= 2023–24 Under 20 Elite League =

European Elite League

Tournament details
- Teams: 8 (from 8 associations)

Tournament statistics
- Matches played: 24
- Goals scored: 69 (2.88 per match)
- Top scorer: (England) Dane Scarlett (5 goals)

The 2023–24 Under 20 Elite League was an age-restricted association football tournament for national Under-20 teams. It was the sixth edition of the Under 20 Elite League.

== Participating teams ==
- Czech Republic
- England
- Germany
- Italy
- Norway
- Poland
- Portugal
- Romania

== League table ==
Pos	Team	Pld	W	D	L	GF	GA	GD	Pts
1	Italy	6	4	2	0	8	2	+6	14
2	Germany	6	3	2	1	11	8	+3	11
3	Portugal	7	3	1	3	10	13	−3	10
4	England	6	3	0	3	12	11	+1	9
5	Poland	6	2	2	2	8	8	0	8
6	Romania	7	2	2	3	6	9	−3	8
7	Norway	3	2	0	1	8	3	+5	6
8	Czech Republic	7	0	1	6	6	15	−9	1

== Matches ==
Results
Date	Home team	Score	Away team
7 September 2023	Romania U20	2–0	Czech Republic U20
7 September 2023	Germany U20	1–1	Italy U20
8 September 2023	Poland U20	4–0	Portugal U20
11 September 2023	Poland U20	1–1	Germany U20
11 September 2023	Czech Republic U20	0–1	Italy U20
12 September 2023	Portugal U20	2–1	Romania U20
12 October 2023	Norway U20	2–1	Czech Republic U20
12 October 2023	Romania U20	2–0	England U20
13 October 2023	Portugal U20	1–2	Germany U20
13 October 2023	Italy U20	1–0	Poland U20
16 October 2023	Germany U20	4–2	Czech Republic U20
16 October 2023	Norway U20	5–0	Romania U20
17 October 2023	Portugal U20	2–1	England U20
16 November 2023	England U20	0–3	Italy U20
17 November 2023	Portugal U20	2–1	Norway U20
17 November 2023	Romania U20	0–1	Germany U20
17 November 2023	Czech Republic U20	0–1	Poland U20
20 November 2023	Germany U20	2–3	England U20
21 November 2023	Italy U20	2–1	Portugal U20
21 March 2024	Portugal U20	2–2	Czech Republic U20
21 March 2024	Romania U20	0–0	Italy U20
22 March 2024	Poland U20	1–5	England U20
26 March 2024	Czech Republic U20	1–3	England U20
26 March 2024	Romania U20	1–1	Poland U20
