= 2026–27 FC Rapid București season =

FC Rapid București
2026–27 season
- Manager: Daniel Pancu
- Stadium: Rapid-Giulești Stadium
- Superliga: Pre-season
- Cupa României: Pre-season
| Home colours | Away colours | Third colours |

The 2026–27 season is the 104th season in the history of Fotbal Club Rapid 1923 and their sixth consecutive season in Liga I. The club will also compete in the Cupa României.

== Transfers ==
=== In ===
| Pos. | Player | Transferred from | Fee | Date | Source |
|---|---|---|---|---|---|
| DF | (Bosnia and Herzegovina) Daniel Graovac | (Romania) FCSB | Free | 2 July 2026 | |
| DF | (Slovenia) Alin Celik Kumer | (Italy) Genoa U20 | Loan | 16 July 2026 | |

=== Out ===
| Pos. | Player | Transferred to | Fee | Date | Source |
|---|---|---|---|---|---|
| MF | (Montenegro) Vladan Bubanja | (Russia) Orenburg | Loan | 1 July 2026 | |
| FW | (Liberia) Mohammed Kamara | (Romania) CFR Cluj | Free | 1 July 2026 | |
| FW | (Romania) Jason Kodor | (Italy) Lecce U20 | Undisclosed | 1 July 2026 | |

== Pre-season ==
| 2 July 2026 Friendly | Dynamo Kyiv (Ukraine) | 1–3 | (Romania) Rapid București | Austria |
| 17:00 | Buyalskiy 57' (pen.) | | Sawy 53'; Burmaz 76' (pen.); Kamara 89' |

| 5 July 2026 Friendly | Rapid Wien (Austria) | 0–0 | (Romania) Rapid București | Austria |
| 17:15 |

| 8 July 2026 Friendly | Košice (Slovakia) | 1–1 | (Romania) Rapid București | Austria |
| 17:30 | 90+1' | | 49' |

| 9 July 2026 Friendly | Rapid București (Romania) | 1–2 | (Czech Republic) Slovan Liberec | Austria |
| 17:30 |

== Competitions ==
=== Superliga ===
==== Regular season ====
| Pos | Team | Pld | W | D | L | GF | GA | GD | Pts | Qualification |
|---|---|---|---|---|---|---|---|---|---|---|
| 1 | Dinamo București | 14 | 10 | 3 | 1 | 31 | 9 | +22 | 33 | Advances to Play-off |
| 2 | Universitatea Craiova | 14 | 10 | 2 | 2 | 34 | 10 | +24 | 32 | Advances to Play-off |
| 3 | Rapid București | 14 | 9 | 3 | 2 | 23 | 13 | +10 | 30 | Advances to Play-off |
| 4 | Universitatea Cluj | 14 | 8 | 1 | 5 | 26 | 20 | +6 | 25 | Advances to Play-off |
| 5 | Petrolul Ploiești | 14 | 7 | 3 | 4 | 19 | 18 | +1 | 24 | Advances to Play-off |

Updated to match(es) played on 2 November 2026. Source: LPF (in Romanian)
Rules for classification: 1) Points; 2) Head-to-head points; 3) Head-to-head goal difference; 4) Head-to-head goals scored; 5) Goal difference; 6) Goals scored; 7) Play-off.

| 18–19 July 2026 1 | Rapid București | v | Sepsi OSK |
