= Filipe Cruz =

Filipe Cruz may refer to:

- Filipe Cruz (handballer) (born 1969), Angolan handballer coach and former player
- Filipe Cruz (footballer) (born 2002), Portuguese footballer
