= Alessandro Cortinovis =

Alessandro Cortinovis may refer to:

- Alessandro Cortinovis (cyclist)
- Alessandro Cortinovis (footballer)
