= Mateusz Górski =

Polish footballer

Personal information
- Date of birth: 5 February 2000 (age 26)
- Place of birth: Duszniki Zdrój, Poland
- Height: 1.94 m (6 ft 4 in)
- Position: Goalkeeper

Team information
- Current team: Nysa Kłodzko
- Number: 12

Youth career
- 2011: Orlęta Krosnowice
- 2011–2014: Nysa Kłodzko
- 2014–2017: FC Wrocław Academy Wrocław
- 2017–2019: Ajax

Senior career*
Years	Team	Apps	(Gls)
2019–2021	Puszcza Niepołomice	23	(0)
2022–2023	KKS 1925 Kalisz	10	(0)
2023–2024	Śląsk Wrocław	0	(0)
2023–2024	Śląsk Wrocław II	9	(0)
2024–2025	GKS Tychy	0	(0)
2025–2026	Skra Częstochowa	7	(0)
2026	Słowianin Wolibórz	1	(0)
2026–	Nysa Kłodzko	1	(0)

International career
2019	Poland U20	1	(0)
- * Club domestic league appearances and goals as of 18:48, 17 August 2026 (UTC)

Mateusz Górski (born 5 February 2000) is a Polish professional footballer who plays as a goalkeeper for regional league club Nysa Kłodzko.

== Career ==
At the age of 16, Górski joined the youth academy of Ajax, the Netherlands' most successful club, after trialing for Porto, one of the most successful teams in Portugal.

In 2019, he signed for Polish side Puszcza Niepołomice.

On 27 July 2023, almost a month after leaving KKS 1925 Kalisz as a free agent, Górski joined Ekstraklasa side Śląsk Wrocław on a one-year deal with an extension option.

Górski made no first team appearances during his stay at Śląsk, and left the club on 19 June 2024 to join I liga club GKS Tychy on a two-year contract. His sole appearance came on 25 September 2024, in a 4–2 Polish Cup first round loss to Olimpia Grudziądz.

In August 2025, Górski moved to III liga club Skra Częstochowa. After making seven league appearances, he left Skra by mutual consent on 14 January 2026.

On 13 February 2026, Górski moved to III liga club Słowianin Wolibórz. He only played one match for the club. He left Słowianin after the club withdrew from III liga.

In August 2026, he joined regional league club Nysa Kłodzko.
