= Sajdak =

Sajdak is a Polish surname. Notable people with the surname include:

- Przemysław Sajdak (born 2000), Polish football player
- Tomasz Sajdak (born 1984), Polish football player
- Pat Sajak (born Patrick Sajdak, 1946), American television personality and game show host
