= Mateusz Maćkowiak =

Polish footballer

Personal information
- Date of birth: 29 May 2001 (age 25)
- Place of birth: Poznań, Poland
- Height: 1.75 m (5 ft 9 in)
- Position: Left-back

Team information
- Current team: Polonia Środa Wielkopolska
- Number: 29

Youth career
- –2016: Warta Poznań
- 2016–2017: Pogoń Szczecin
- 2017–2020: RB Leipzig

Senior career*
Years	Team	Apps	(Gls)
2020–2023	Śląsk Wrocław	0	(0)
2020–2021	Śląsk Wrocław II	17	(0)
2021–2022	→ Odra Opole (loan)	17	(2)
2022–2023	→ Stomil Olsztyn (loan)	13	(1)
2023–2024	Skra Częstochowa	27	(0)
2024–2025	Warta Poznań	4	(0)
2025	Sandecja Nowy Sącz	0	(0)
2025–	Polonia Środa Wielkopolska	14	(1)

International career
- Poland U15
2016–2017	Poland U16	4	(0)
2017–2018	Poland U17	6	(0)
2018–2019	Poland U18	4	(0)
2021	Poland U20	3	(1)
- * Club domestic league appearances and goals as of 17:13, 4 June 2026 (UTC)

Mateusz Maćkowiak (born 29 May 2001) is a Polish professional footballer who plays as a left-back for III liga club Polonia Środa Wielkopolska.

== Career statistics ==
As of match played 30 May 2026

Appearances and goals by club, season and competition
Club	Season	League			Polish Cup		Continental		Other		Total	
Club	Season	Division	Apps	Goals	Apps	Goals	Apps	Goals	Apps	Goals	Apps	Goals
Śląsk Wrocław II	2019–20	III liga, gr. III	1	0	0	0	—		—		1	0
Śląsk Wrocław II	2020–21	II liga	16	0	0	0	—		—		16	0
Śląsk Wrocław II	Total		17	0	0	0	—		—		17	0
Odra Opole (loan)	2021–22	I liga	17	2	1	0	—		—		18	2
Stomil Olsztyn (loan)	2022–23	II liga	12	1	0	0	—		1 (Note: Appearance in II liga promotion play-offs)	0	13	1
Skra Częstochowa	2023–24	II liga	27	0	1	0	—		—		28	0
Warta Poznań	2024–25	I liga	4	0	2	0	—		—		6	0
Sandecja Nowy Sącz	2024–25	III liga, gr. IV	0	0	—		—		—		0	0
Polonia Środa Wielkopolska	2025–26	III liga, gr. II	14	1	1	0	—		—		15	1
Career total			91	4	5	0	—		1	0	97	4

== Honours ==
Śląsk Wrocław II

- III liga, group III: 2019–20

Polonia Środa Wielkopolska

- Polish Cup (Greater Poland regionals): 2025–26
