= Paweł Mandrysz =

Polish footballer

Personal information
- Full name: Paweł Mandrysz
- Date of birth: 1 December 1997 (age 28)
- Place of birth: Szczecin, Poland
- Height: 1.72 m (5 ft 8 in)
- Position: Winger

Team information
- Current team: ROW 1964 Rybnik
- Number: 10

Youth career
- RKP Rybnik
- 2012–2013: Energetyk ROW Rybnik

Senior career*
Years	Team	Apps	(Gls)
2013–2016	ROW 1964 Rybnik	66	(9)
2016–2018	GKS Katowice	45	(4)
2018–2019	Ruch Chorzów	18	(0)
2019–2020	ROW 1964 Rybnik	14	(1)
2020–2021	Sandecja Nowy Sącz	11	(0)
2021–2022	Polonia Środa Wielkopolska	25	(3)
2022–	ROW 1964 Rybnik	105	(28)

International career
2014	Poland U18	2	(0)
2017	Poland U20	5	(1)
- * Club domestic league appearances and goals as of 21:03, 25 June 2026 (UTC)

Paweł Mandrysz (born 1 December 1997) is a Polish professional footballer who plays as a winger for III liga club ROW 1964 Rybnik.

== Club career ==
On 28 August 2020, he joined Sandecja Nowy Sącz.

== Honours ==
Polonia Środa Wielkopolska

- Polish Cup (Greater Poland regionals): 2020–21, 2021–22

ROW 1964 Rybnik

- IV liga Silesia: 2025–26
- Polish Cup (Rybnik regionals): 2023–24, 2024–25
