= 2025–26 Under 20 Elite League =

European Elite League

Tournament details
- Dates: 4 September 2025 – 31 March 2026
- Teams: 7 (from 7 associations)

Final positions
- Champions: Portugal
- Runners-up: Germany
- Third place: Poland
- Fourth place: Switzerland

Tournament statistics
- Matches played: 21
- Goals scored: 74 (3.52 per match)
- Top scorer(s): (Germany) Paris Brunner (8 goals)

The 2025–26 Under 20 Elite League was an age-restricted association football tournament for national under-20 teams. It was the 8th edition of the Under 20 Elite League.

== Participating teams ==
- Czech Republic
- Germany
- Italy
- Poland
- Portugal
- Romania
- Switzerland

== League table ==
Pos	Team	Pld	W	D	L	GF	GA	GD	Pts
1	Portugal	8	7	1	0	16	5	+11	22
2	Germany	8	6	0	2	24	5	+19	18
3	Poland	5	3	0	2	10	5	+5	9
4	Switzerland	5	2	0	3	7	14	−7	6
5	Czech Republic	7	1	1	5	11	16	−5	4
6	Romania	6	0	2	4	5	18	−13	2
7	Italy	3	0	0	3	1	11	−10	0

Source: Soccerway

== Matches ==
Date	Home team	Score	Away team
4 September 2025	Portugal	3–0	Czech Republic
5 September 2025	Switzerland	1–5	Germany
8 September 2025	Switzerland	2–1	Czech Republic
9 September 2025	Poland	1–2	Portugal
9 September 2025	Germany	4–0	Italy
10 October 2025	Romania	2–2	Czech Republic
10 October 2025	Portugal	2–1	Germany
13 October 2025	Poland	4–1	Switzerland
13 October 2025	Romania	1–5	Czech Republic
13 October 2025	Portugal	1–0	Germany
14 November 2025	Czech Republic	1–4	Poland
14 November 2025	Italy	1–2	Portugal
14 November 2025	Germany	6–0	Romania
17 November 2025	Portugal	1–1	Romania
17 November 2025	Germany	5–0	Italy
26 March 2026	Germany	2–1	Czech Republic
27 March 2026	Romania	0–1	Poland
27 March 2026	Portugal	3–0	Switzerland
30 March 2026	Czech Republic	1–2	Portugal
31 March 2026	Switzerland	3–1	Romania
31 March 2026	Poland	0–1	Germany
