= 2026–27 Under 20 Elite League =

European Elite League

Tournament details
- Dates: 25 September 2026 – 31 March 2027
- Teams: 9

The 2026–27 Under 20 Elite League is an age-restricted association football tournament for national under-20 teams. It is the 9th edition of the Under 20 Elite League.

== Participating teams ==
- Czech Republic
- England
- France
- Germany
- Italy
- Poland
- Portugal
- Romania
- Switzerland

== League table ==
| Pos | Team | Pld | W | D | L | GF | GA | GD | Pts |
|---|---|---|---|---|---|---|---|---|---|
| 1 | England | 3 | 3 | 0 | 0 | 7 | 3 | +4 | 9 |
| 2 | Poland | 2 | 2 | 0 | 0 | 5 | 1 | +4 | 6 |
| 3 | Germany | 3 | 2 | 0 | 1 | 5 | 2 | +3 | 6 |
| 4 | Portugal | 3 | 1 | 0 | 2 | 7 | 5 | +2 | 3 |
| 5 | Italy | 3 | 1 | 0 | 2 | 4 | 6 | −2 | 3 |
| 6 | Switzerland | 2 | 1 | 0 | 1 | 4 | 6 | −2 | 3 |
| 7 | Czech Republic | 3 | 1 | 0 | 2 | 5 | 9 | −4 | 3 |
| 8 | Romania | 0 | 0 | 0 | 0 | 0 | 0 | 0 | 0 |
| 9 | France | 3 | 0 | 0 | 3 | 1 | 6 | −5 | 0 |

Updated to match(es) played on 3 October 2026. Source: Soccerway

== Matches ==
| Date | Home team | Score | Away team |
|---|---|---|---|
| 25 September 2026 | Italy | 1–3 | England |
| 25 September 2026 | Germany | 1–0 | France |
| 26 September 2026 | Portugal | 1–3 | Poland |
| 26 September 2026 | Czech Republic | 5–2 | Switzerland |
| 29 September 2026 | France | 1–2 | England |
| 29 September 2026 | Portugal | 1–2 | Switzerland |
| 29 September 2026 | Germany | 3–0 | Italy |
| 29 September 2026 | Poland | 2–0 | Czech Republic |
| 2 October 2026 | Portugal | 5–0 | Czech Republic |
| 3 October 2026 | France | 0–3 | Italy |
| 3 October 2026 | England | 2–1 | Germany |
| 12 November 2026 | England | – | Czech Republic |
| 12 November 2026 | Italy | – | Portugal |
| 13 November 2026 | Poland | – | Germany |
| 13 November 2026 | Switzerland | – | Romania |
| 16 November 2026 | Italy | – | Switzerland |
| 16 November 2026 | Portugal | – | England |
| 17 November 2026 | Czech Republic | – | Germany |
| 17 November 2026 | Romania | – | Poland |
| 25 March 2027 | Czech Republic | – | Italy |
| 26 March 2027 | Poland | – | England |
| 26 March 2027 | Portugal | – | Romania |
| 26 March 2027 | Switzerland | – | Germany |
| 29 March 2027 | Romania | – | Czech Republic |
| 30 March 2027 | England | – | Switzerland |
| 30 March 2027 | Germany | – | Portugal |
| 30 March 2027 | Italy | – | Poland |
