= Patryk Mikita =

Polish footballer

Personal information
- Full name: Patryk Mikita
- Date of birth: 28 December 1993 (age 32)
- Place of birth: Warsaw, Poland
- Height: 1.85 m (6 ft 1 in)
- Position: Forward

Team information
- Current team: Polonia Środa Wielkopolska
- Number: 7

Youth career
- 2004–2005: Polonia Warsaw
- 2005–2012: Agrykola Warsaw
- 2012–2013: Legia Warsaw

Senior career*
Years	Team	Apps	(Gls)
2013–2014	Legia Warsaw II	4	(1)
2013–2015	Legia Warsaw	11	(1)
2014	→ Widzew Łódź (loan)	7	(0)
2014	→ Widzew Łódź II (loan)	2	(0)
2014–2015	→ Dolcan Ząbki (loan)	17	(1)
2015–2017	Chojniczanka Chojnice	35	(3)
2017–2018	Siarka Tarnobrzeg	13	(4)
2018–2021	Radomiak Radom	87	(20)
2021–2022	Stomil Olsztyn	33	(11)
2022–2024	GKS Tychy	60	(6)
2024–2025	Zawisza Bydgoszcz	26	(22)
2025–	Polonia Środa Wielkopolska	31	(9)

International career
2013–2014	Poland U20	5	(3)
2013	Poland U21	1	(0)
- * Club domestic league appearances and goals as of 16:12, 4 June 2026 (UTC)

Patryk Mikita (born 28 December 1993) is a Polish professional footballer who plays as a forward for III liga club Polonia Środa Wielkopolska.

== Honours ==
Legia Warsaw

- Ekstraklasa: 2013–14

Radomiak Radom

- I liga: 2020–21
- II liga: 2018–19

Zawisza Bygdoszcz

- Polish Cup (Kuyavia-Pomerania regionals): 2024–25

Polonia Środa Wielkopolska

- Polish Cup (Greater Poland regionals): 2025–26

Individual

- III liga, group II top scorer: 2024–25
