= Robert Mustacă =

Romanian professional footballer

Personal information
- Full name: Robert Cristian Mustacă
- Date of birth: 5 October 2002 (age 24)
- Place of birth: Constanța, Romania
- Height: 1.75 m (5 ft 9 in)
- Position: Right winger

Team information
- Current team: Popești-Leordeni
- Number: 7

Youth career
- –2021: Gheorghe Hagi Academy

Senior career*
| Years | Team | Apps | (Gls) |
| 2021–2026 | Farul Constanța | 0 | (0) |
| 2021–2022 | → Unirea Slobozia (loan) | 22 | (4) |
| 2022 | → Concordia Chiajna (loan) | 12 | (0) |
| 2023 | → Unirea Slobozia (loan) | 6 | (0) |
| 2023 | → UTA Arad (loan) | 4 | (0) |
| 2023–2024 | → Voluntari (loan) | 1 | (0) |
| 2025–2026 | → CSM Olimpia Satu Mare (loan) | 14 | (0) |
| 2026 | Tunari | 11 | (2) |
| 2026– | Popești-Leordeni | 8 | (1) |

International career
| 2021–2022 | Romania U20 | 10 | (2) |
- * Club domestic league appearances and goals as of 31 October 2026

Robert Cristian Mustacă (born 5 October 2002) is a Romanian professional footballer who plays as a right winger for Liga II club Popești-Leordeni.

== Club career ==
=== UTA Arad ===
He made his Liga I debut for UTA Arad against Oțelul Galați on 14 July 2023.

== Personal life ==
Robert's father, Cristian, was also a professional footballer.
