= Romuald Chojnacki =

Polish footballer (born 1950)

Personal information
- Date of birth: 6 February 1950 (age 76)
- Place of birth: Częstochowa, Poland
- Height: 1.75 m (5 ft 9 in)
- Position: Forward

Senior career*
Years	Team	Apps	(Gls)
1966–1968	Skra Częstochowa		
1968–1974	Polonia Bytom	108	(13)
1974–1976	Ruch Chorzów	57	(10)
1976–1981	Lech Poznań	149	(31)
1981–1983	Angoulême		
1983–1988	AS Cherbourg		

International career
1974	Poland	2	(0)
- * Club domestic league appearances and goals

Romuald Chojnacki (born 6 February 1950) is a Polish former footballer who played as a forward.

He made two appearances for the Poland national team in 1974.
