= Robert Jălade =

Romanian footballer (born 2005)

Personal information
- Full name: Robert Răzvan Jălade
- Date of birth: 28 March 2005 (age 21)
- Place of birth: Manresa, Spain
- Height: 1.84 m (6 ft 0 in)
- Positions: Centre-back; defensive midfielder

Team information
- Current team: Sevilla B
- Number: 5

Youth career
- –2020: Gimnàstic Manresa
- 2020–2023: Damm
- 2023–2024: Sevilla

Senior career*
Years	Team	Apps	(Gls)
2024	Sevilla C	3	(0)
2024–	Sevilla B	43	(0)

International career^{‡}
2023–2024	Romania U19	11	(0)
2024–2026	Romania U20	12	(1)
2025	Romania U21	2	(0)
- * Club domestic league appearances and goals as of 27 September 2026 ‡ National team caps and goals as of 31 March 2026

Robert Răzvan Jălade (born 28 March 2005) is a Romanian professional footballer who plays as a centre-back or a defensive midfielder for Segunda Federación club Sevilla Atlético. Born in Spain, he has been called up to represent Romania internationally.

== Career statistics ==
As of 27 September 2026

Appearances and goals by club, season and competition
Club	Season	League			National cup		Europe		Other		Total	
Club	Season	Division	Apps	Goals	Apps	Goals	Apps	Goals	Apps	Goals	Apps	Goals
Sevilla C	2023–24	Tercera Federación	3	0	—		—		—		3	0
Sevilla B	2024–25	Primera Federación	17	0	—		—		—		17	0
Sevilla B	2025–26	Primera Federación	23	0	—		—		—		23	0
Sevilla B	2026–27	Segunda Federación	3	0	—		—		—		3	0
Sevilla B	Total		43	0	—		—		—		43	0
Career total			46	0	0	0	—		—		46	0
