= Jonathan de Amo =

Spanish footballer (born 1990)

Personal information
- Full name: Jonathan de Amo Pérez
- Date of birth: 13 January 1990 (age 36)
- Place of birth: Barcelona, Spain
- Height: 1.90 m (6 ft 3 in)
- Position: Centre-back

Team information
- Current team: Polonia Środa Wielkopolska
- Number: 6

Youth career
- Damm
- Cornellà

Senior career*
Years	Team	Apps	(Gls)
2009–2010	Sant Andreu	3	(0)
2010–2012	Racing Santander B	27	(0)
2011	→ Ontinyent (loan)	5	(0)
2012–2013	Espanyol B	30	(1)
2013–2014	Widzew Łódź	14	(0)
2014–2016	Celta B	61	(2)
2016–2018	Miedź Legnica	44	(2)
2018–2019	Stal Mielec	25	(3)
2019–2021	Bruk-Bet Termalica	39	(1)
2021–2022	Stal Mielec	28	(3)
2022–2025	Górnik Łęczna	64	(3)
2025	Som Maresme	0	(0)
2025–	Polonia Środa Wielkopolska	22	(1)
- * Club domestic league appearances and goals as of 22:29, 3 June 2026 (UTC)

Jonathan de Amo Pérez (born 13 January 1990) is a Spanish professional footballer who plays as a central defender for III liga club Polonia Środa Wielkopolska.

== Club career ==
De Amo was born in Barcelona, Catalonia. He never played in higher than the Segunda División B in his homeland, representing UE Sant Andreu, Ontinyent CF, RCD Espanyol B and Celta de Vigo B.

De Amo spent his entire professional career in Poland, starting out at Widzew Łódź after signing a one-year contract in summer 2013. In that country's Ekstraklasa, he also appeared for Miedź Legnica, Stal Mielec and GKS Górnik Łęczna.

In the 2017–18 season, de Amo contributed 21 games and one goal as Miedź won the I liga and subsequently promoted to the top flight.

== Honours ==
Miedź Legnica

- I liga: 2017–18

Polonia Środa Wielkopolska

- Polish Cup (Greater Poland regionals): 2025–26
