= Under 20 Elite League =

Under-20 Elite League
- Organiser(s): Self-governing tournament
- Founded: 2017; 9 years ago
- Region: Europe
- Teams: 9
- Current champions: Germany
- Most championships: Italy (3 titles)
- 2026–27 Under 20 Elite League

The Under 20 Elite League, also known as the European Elite League, is an under-20 (U20) association football tournament founded in 2017.

== History ==
Competed in by national European U20 teams, it is the successor to the Under-20 Four Nations Tournament.

The initial eight participating teams were Germany, England, Italy, the Netherlands, Poland, Portugal, the Czech Republic, and Switzerland. The 2019-2020 edition marked the first instance where the tournament was not completed, and the subsequent edition was cancelled due to the pandemic emergency.

Starting from the 2021-2022 edition, Norway and Romania replaced the Netherlands and Switzerland. Additionally, in the 2021-2022 edition, the trophy was awarded without completing all matches due to the inability to reschedule the match between England and Norway. Subsequent editions also faced disruptions, so the title is being awarded to the team leading the standings.

Italy national under-20 football team won the tournament a record three times (2021–22, 2022–23, 2023–24).

== Format ==
The Under 20 Elite League is a self-governing tournament made up of eight participating federations. The tournament follows a round-robin format with only one leg. Unlike the previous tournament's format, there are no return matches, resulting in a total of seven matches for each national team.

== Results ==
Edition	Winners	Ref.
2017–18	Germany	
2018–19	Netherlands	
2019–20	suspended due to COVID-19 pandemic	
2020–21	not played due to COVID-19 pandemic	
2021–22	Italy (Note: The seventh and final match between England and Norway, which could have given the title to the English team, was not played.)	
2022–23	Italy	
2023–24	Italy	
2024–25	Germany	
2025–26	Portugal	

== Performances by countries ==
Team	Winners	Runners-up	Third place	Fourth place
Italy	3 (2022, 2023, 2024)		1 (2025)	1 (2018)
Germany	2 (2018, 2025)	2 (2023, 2024)	3 (2019, 2022, 2026)	
Netherlands	1 (2019)			
Portugal	1 (2026)	1 (2019)	1 (2024)	2 (2022, 2025)
England		3 (2018, 2022, 2025)		2 (2019, 2024)
Czech Republic			2 (2018, 2023)	
Poland			1 (2026)	1 (2023)

== See also ==
- Under-20 Four Nations Tournament
