= Alexandru Mogoș =

Romanian professional footballer

Personal information
- Full name: Alexandru Răzvan Mogoș
- Date of birth: 30 August 2002 (age 24)
- Place of birth: Drobeta-Turnu Severin, Romania
- Height: 1.81 m (5 ft 11 in)
- Position: Winger

Team information
- Current team: Gloria Bistrița
- Number: 30

Youth career
- 2010–2015: Sport Kids Severin
- 2015–2018: CSȘ Drobeta-Turnu Severin
- 2018–2021: Virtus Entella

Senior career*
Years	Team	Apps	(Gls)
2021–2022	CS Hunedoara		
2022–2023	Ripensia Timișoara	15	(0)
2023	Politehnica Iași	11	(0)
2023	→ CSM Alexandria (loan)	9	(0)
2024	SCM Zalău		
2025–	Gloria Bistrița	25	(1)

International career
2022–2023	Romania U20	5	(1)
- * Club domestic league appearances and goals as of 1 November 2026

Alexandru Răzvan Mogoș (born 30 August 2002) is a Romanian professional footballer who plays as a winger for Liga II club Gloria Bistrița.

== Club career ==
=== Politehnica Iași ===
He made his Liga I debut for Politehnica Iași against UTA Arad on 4 August 2023.

== Honours ==
Hunedoara

- Liga III: 2021–22

Politehnica Iași

- Liga II: 2022–23

Gloria Bistrița

- Liga III: 2024–25
