= David Paraschiv =

Romanian footballer

Personal information
- Full name: David Ionuț Paraschiv
- Date of birth: 28 September 2006 (age 20)
- Place of birth: Bucharest, Romania
- Height: 1.85 m (6 ft 1 in)
- Position: Central midfielder

Team information
- Current team: Petrolul Ploiești
- Number: 21

Youth career
- –2024: Sport Team București
- 2024–2025: Petrolul Ploiești

Senior career*
Years	Team	Apps	(Gls)
2025–	Petrolul Ploiești	14	(0)

International career^{‡}
2025–	Romania U20	1	(0)
- * Club domestic league appearances and goals as of 17 October 2026 ‡ National team caps and goals as of 11 October 2025

David Ionuț Paraschiv (born 19 July 2006) is a Romanian professional footballer who plays as a central midfielder for Liga I club Petrolul Ploiești.

== Personal life ==
Paraschiv's father, Sorin, was also a football player.
