= Narcis Ilaș =

Romanian footballer (born 2007)

Personal information
- Full name: Narcis Cosmin Ilaș
- Date of birth: 27 March 2007 (age 19)
- Place of birth: Botoșani, Romania
- Height: 1.75 m (5 ft 9 in)
- Positions: Full-back; winger

Team information
- Current team: Botoșani
- Number: 73

Youth career
- –2024: Botoșani
- 2023–2024: → Lazio (loan)

Senior career*
Years	Team	Apps	(Gls)
2023–	Botoșani	31	(0)
2024–2025	→ Ceahlăul Piatra Neamț (loan)	20	(1)

International career^{‡}
2022	Romania U15	6	(0)
2022–2023	Romania U16	4	(0)
2023–2024	Romania U17	8	(0)
2024–2025	Romania U18	6	(0)
2025	Romania U19	3	(0)
2026–	Romania U20	2	(0)
- * Club domestic league appearances and goals as of 23 October 2026 ‡ National team caps and goals as of 31 March 2026

Narcis Cosmin Ilaș (born 27 March 2007) is a Romanian professional footballer who plays as a full-back or a winger for Liga I club Botoșani.

== Career statistics ==
As of 23 October 2026

Appearances and goals by club, season and competition
Club	Season	League			Cupa României		Europe		Other		Total	
Club	Season	Division	Apps	Goals	Apps	Goals	Apps	Goals	Apps	Goals	Apps	Goals
Botoșani	2022–23	Liga I	1	0	—		—		—		1	0
Botoșani	2024–25	Liga I	0	0	—		—		—		0	0
Botoșani	2025–26	Liga I	18	0	1	0	—		—		19	0
Botoșani	2026–27	Liga I	12	0	0	0	—		—		12	0
Botoșani	Total		31	0	1	0	—		—		32	0
Ceahlăul Piatra Neamț (loan)	2024–25	Liga II	20	1	2	0	—		—		22	1
Career total			51	1	3	0	—		—		54	1
