= Rafael Munteanu =

Romanian footballer (born 2006)

Personal information
- Full name: Rafael Ștefan Munteanu
- Date of birth: 1 March 2006 (age 20)
- Place of birth: Constanța, Romania
- Height: 1.90 m (6 ft 3 in)
- Position: Goalkeeper

Team information
- Current team: Farul Constanța
- Number: 12

Youth career
- 2012–2024: Gheorghe Hagi Academy

Senior career*
Years	Team	Apps	(Gls)
2024–	Farul Constanța	28	(0)
2024	→ CSA Steaua București (loan)	7	(0)
2025	→ AFC Câmpulung Muscel (loan)	8	(0)

International career^{‡}
2021–2022	Romania U16	5	(0)
2022–2023	Romania U17	8	(0)
2023–2024	Romania U18	5	(0)
2024–2025	Romania U19	4	(0)
2025–	Romania U20	3	(0)
2026–	Romania U21	1	(0)
- * Club domestic league appearances and goals as of 7 November 2026 ‡ National team caps and goals as of 13 November 2026

Rafael Ștefan Munteanu (born 1 March 2006) is a Romanian professional footballer who plays as a goalkeeper for Liga I club Farul Constanța.

== Career statistics ==
As of match played 7 November 2026

Appearances and goals by club, season and competition
Club	Season	League			Cupa României		Europe		Other		Total	
Club	Season	Division	Apps	Goals	Apps	Goals	Apps	Goals	Apps	Goals	Apps	Goals
CSA Steaua București (loan)	2024–25	Liga II	7	0	0	0	—		—		7	0
AFC Câmpulung Muscel (loan)	2024–25	Liga II	8	0	—		—		—		8	0
Farul Constanța	2025–26	Liga I	13	0	4	0	—		1 (Note: Appearance in Liga I promotion/relegation play-offs)	0	18	0
Farul Constanța	2026–27	Liga I	15	0	0	0	—		—		15	0
Farul Constanța	Total		28	0	4	0	—		1	0	33	0
Career total			43	0	4	0	—		1	0	48	0
