= Jerzy Orłowski =

Polish footballer

Personal information
- Date of birth: 16 February 1925
- Place of birth: Częstochowa, Poland
- Date of death: 28 March 2015 (aged 90)
- Place of death: Częstochowa, Poland
- Height: 1.74 m (5 ft 9 in)
- Position: Defender

Senior career*
Years	Team	Apps	(Gls)
1939	Skra Częstochowa		
1946	Concordia Zabrze		
1946–1948	Skra Częstochowa		
1949–1957	Legia Warsaw	103	(0)
1958–1959	Skra Częstochowa		

International career
1954	Poland	1	(0)

Managerial career
- Skra Częstochowa
- Raków Częstochowa
- Skra Częstochowa
- * Club domestic league appearances and goals

Jerzy Orłowski (16 February 1925 – 28 March 2015) was a Polish footballer who played as a defender. He played for Skra Częstochowa, Concordia Zabrze, Legia Warsaw and the Poland national team.

== Honours ==
Legia Warsaw

- Ekstraklasa: 1955
- Polish Cup: 1954–55
