= Darius Fălcușan =

Romanian footballer (born 2006)

Personal information
- Full name: Darius Gabriel Fălcușan
- Date of birth: 14 February 2006 (age 20)
- Place of birth: Madrid, Spain
- Height: 1.87 m (6 ft 2 in)
- Position: Centre-back

Team information
- Current team: Concordia Chiajna (on loan from Universitatea Craiova)
- Number: 24

Youth career
- 2014–2023: Universitatea Cluj
- 2023: → Empoli (loan)
- 2023–2025: Empoli

Senior career*
Years	Team	Apps	(Gls)
2025–	Universitatea Craiova	1	(0)
2026–	→ Concordia Chiajna (loan)	5	(1)

International career^{‡}
2021–2022	Romania U16	7	(0)
2022–2023	Romania U17	9	(1)
2023–2024	Romania U18	7	(0)
2024–2025	Romania U19	12	(1)
2025–	Romania U20	7	(1)
- * Club domestic league appearances and goals as of 1 November 2026 ‡ National team caps and goals as of 13 November 2026

Darius Gabriel Fălcușan (born 14 February 2006) is a Romanian professional footballer who plays as a centre-back for Liga II club Concordia Chiajna, on loan from Liga I club Universitatea Craiova.

== Career statistics ==
As of 1 November 2026

Appearances and goals by club, season and competition
Club	Season	League			Cupa României		Europe		Other		Total	
Club	Season	Division	Apps	Goals	Apps	Goals	Apps	Goals	Apps	Goals	Apps	Goals
Universitatea Craiova	2025–26	Liga I	1	0	1	0	0	0	—		2	0
Universitatea Craiova	2026–27	Liga I	0	0	—		0	0	0	0	0	0
Universitatea Craiova	Total		1	0	1	0	0	0	0	0	2	0
Concordia Chiajna (loan)	2026–27	Liga I	5	1	3	0	—		—		8	1
Career total			6	1	4	0	0	0	0	0	10	1

== Honours ==
Universitatea Craiova

- Liga I: 2025–26
- Cupa României: 2025–26
- Supercupa României: 2026
