= Yanis Pîrvu =

Romanian footballer (born 2007)

Personal information
- Full name: Yanis Christian Nikolas Pîrvu
- Date of birth: 2 April 2007 (age 19)
- Place of birth: Bucharest, Romania
- Height: 1.73 m (5 ft 8 in)
- Position: Winger

Team information
- Current team: Argeș Pitești
- Number: 11

Youth career
- 2012–2022: Școala de Fotbal Dănuț Coman
- 2016–2019: → Argeș Pitești (loan)
- 2019–2021: → Marcea Sport (loan)
- 2022–2023: Argeș Pitești

Senior career*
Years	Team	Apps	(Gls)
2022–	Argeș Pitești	102	(9)

International career^{‡}
2022	Romania U15	6	(1)
2022–2023	Romania U16	10	(1)
2023–2024	Romania U17	7	(1)
2024–2025	Romania U18	12	(0)
2025–2026	Romania U19	10	(0)
2026–	Romania U20	2	(0)
2026–	Romania U21	2	(0)
- * Club domestic league appearances and goals as of 6 November 2026 ‡ National team caps and goals as of 17 November 2026

Yanis Christian Nikolas Pîrvu (born 2 April 2007) is a Romanian professional footballer who plays as a winger for Liga I club Argeș Pitești.

== Career statistics ==
As of 6 November 2026

Appearances and goals by club, season and competition
Club	Season	League			Cupa României		Europe		Other		Total	
Club	Season	Division	Apps	Goals	Apps	Goals	Apps	Goals	Apps	Goals	Apps	Goals
Argeș Pitești	2022–23	Liga I	6	0	0	0	—		2 (Note: Appearances in relegation/promotion play-offs)	0	8	0
Argeș Pitești	2023–24	Liga II	17	1	1	0	—		—		18	1
Argeș Pitești	2024–25	Liga II	27	3	3	0	—		—		30	3
Argeș Pitești	2025–26	Liga I	38	3	6	0	—		—		44	3
Argeș Pitești	2026–27	Liga I	14	2	1	0	—		—		15	2
Career total			102	9	11	0	—		2	0	115	9

== Honours ==
Argeș Pitești

- Liga II: 2024–25
