= Maksymilian Tkocz =

Polish footballer

Personal information
- Date of birth: 26 January 2002 (age 24)
- Place of birth: Rybnik, Poland
- Height: 1.87 m (6 ft 2 in)
- Position: Centre-back

Team information
- Current team: Chojniczanka Chojnice
- Number: 19

Youth career
- 2013–2014: RKP Rybnik
- 2014–2015: Promotor Południe Zabrze
- 2015–2016: Górnik Zabrze
- 2016–2019: Legia Warsaw
- 2019–2020: Lech Poznań

Senior career*
Years	Team	Apps	(Gls)
2020–2021	Lech Poznań II	1	(0)
2021	Podhale Nowy Targ (loan)	18	(1)
2021–2023	Odra Opole	37	(1)
2023–2024	Wisła Puławy	14	(1)
2024–	Chojniczanka Chojnice	41	(0)

International career
2017	Poland U16	1	(0)
2021–2023	Poland U20	12	(1)
- * Club domestic league appearances and goals as of 11:04, 31 May 2026 (UTC)

Maksymilian Tkocz (born 26 January 2002) is a Polish professional footballer who plays as a centre-back for II liga club Chojniczanka Chojnice. He is the son of former footballer Jarosław Tkocz.

== Career statistics ==
As of match played 30 May 2026

Appearances and goals by club, season and competition
Club	Season	League			Polish Cup		Continental		Other		Total	
Club	Season	Division	Apps	Goals	Apps	Goals	Apps	Goals	Apps	Goals	Apps	Goals
Lech Poznań II	2020–21	II liga	1	0	0	0	—		—		1	0
Podhale Nowy Targ (loan)	2020–21	III liga, gr. IV	18	1	0	0	—		—		18	1
Odra Opole	2021–22	I liga	18	0	1	0	—		—		19	0
Odra Opole	2022–23	I liga	19	1	1	0	—		—		20	1
Odra Opole	Total		37	1	2	0	—		—		39	1
Wisła Puławy	2023–24	II liga	14	1	2	0	—		—		16	1
Chojniczanka Chojnice	2024–25	II liga	17	0	3	0	—		2 (Note: Appearances in II liga promotion play-offs)	0	22	0
Chojniczanka Chojnice	2025–26	II liga	22	0	3	0	—		—		25	0
Chojniczanka Chojnice	Total		39	0	6	0	—		2	0	47	0
Career total			109	3	10	0	—		2	0	121	3
