= Radosław Gołębiowski =

Polish footballer

Personal information
- Full name: Radosław Gołębiowski
- Date of birth: 24 November 2001 (age 24)
- Place of birth: Częstochowa, Poland
- Height: 1.78 m (5 ft 10 in)
- Position: Midfielder

Team information
- Current team: Lech Poznań II
- Number: 10

Youth career
- 2011–2012: Grom Cykarzew
- 2012–2013: LKPS Borowno
- 2013–2014: Grom Cykarzew
- 2014–2019: Skra Częstochowa

Senior career*
Years	Team	Apps	(Gls)
2019–2021	Skra Częstochowa	48	(2)
2021–2023	Widzew Łódź	25	(2)
2022–2023	→ Skra Częstochowa (loan)	20	(1)
2023–2024	Sandecja Nowy Sącz	37	(7)
2025	Chojniczanka Chojnice	8	(1)
2025–2026	Skra Częstochowa	30	(12)
2026–	Lech Poznań II	12	(1)

International career
2021–2022	Poland U20	3	(1)
- * Club domestic league appearances and goals as of 11:15, 16 November 2026 (UTC)

Radosław Gołębiowski (born 24 November 2001) is a Polish professional footballer who plays as a midfielder for III liga club Lech Poznań II.

== Career statistics ==
As of match played 7 November 2026

Appearances and goals by club, season and competition
Club	Season	League			Polish Cup		Europe		Other		Total	
Club	Season	Division	Apps	Goals	Apps	Goals	Apps	Goals	Apps	Goals	Apps	Goals
Skra Częstochowa	2018–19	II liga	1	0	—		—		—		1	0
Skra Częstochowa	2019–20	II liga	14	0	0	0	—		—		14	0
Skra Częstochowa	2020–21	II liga	31	2	1	1	—		2 (Note: Appearance(s) in II liga promotion play-offs)	0	34	3
Skra Częstochowa	Total		46	2	1	1	—		2	0	49	3
Widzew Łódź	2021–22	I liga	25	2	3	0	—		—		28	2
Skra Częstochowa (loan)	2022–23	I liga	20	1	0	0	—		—		20	1
Sandecja Nowy Sącz	2023–24	II liga	31	7	1	0	—		—		32	7
Sandecja Nowy Sącz	2024–25	III liga, gr. IV	6	0	1	0	—		—		7	0
Sandecja Nowy Sącz	Total		37	7	2	0	—		—		39	7
Chojniczanka Chojnice	2024–25	II liga	7	1	—		—		1	0	8	1
Skra Częstochowa	2025–26	III liga, gr. III	30	12	1	0	—		—		31	12
Lech Poznań II	2026–27	III liga, gr. II	12	1	—		—		—		12	1
Career total			177	26	7	1	—		3	0	187	27

== Honours ==
Skra Częstochowa

- Polish Cup (Częstochowa regionals): 2025–26
