= Przemysław Sajdak =

Polish footballer (born 2000)

Personal information
- Date of birth: 7 February 2000 (age 26)
- Place of birth: Krosno, Poland
- Height: 1.84 m (6 ft 0 in)
- Position: Midfielder

Team information
- Current team: Hutnik Kraków (on loan from Puszcza Niepołomice)
- Number: 20

Youth career
- 2012–2016: Karpaty Krosno

Senior career*
| Years | Team | Apps | (Gls) |
| 2016–2019 | Karpaty Krosno | 19 | (0) |
| 2018–2019 | Puszcza Niepołomice | 11 | (0) |
| 2020–2021 | ŁKS Łódź | 28 | (0) |
| 2021 | ŁKS Łódź II | 1 | (0) |
| 2021–2024 | Skra Częstochowa | 76 | (10) |
| 2024–2025 | Chojniczanka Chojnice | 19 | (0) |
| 2025–2026 | Skra Częstochowa | 31 | (13) |
| 2026– | Puszcza Niepołomice | 2 | (0) |
| 2026– | → Hutnik Kraków (loan) | 0 | (0) |
- * Club domestic league appearances and goals as of 17:59, 9 September 2026 (UTC)

Przemysław Sajdak (born 7 February 2000) is a Polish professional footballer who plays as a midfielder for II liga club Hutnik Kraków, on loan from Puszcza Niepołomice.

== Honours ==
Skra Częstochowa

- Polish Cup (Częstochowa regionals): 2025–26
