= Alessandro Cortinovis (footballer) =

Italian footballer (born 2001)

Personal information
- Date of birth: 25 January 2001 (age 25)
- Place of birth: Bergamo, Italy
- Height: 1.81 m (5 ft 11 in)
- Position: Attacking midfielder

Team information
- Current team: Monopoli
- Number: 72

Youth career
- Atalanta

Senior career*
| Years | Team | Apps | (Gls) |
| 2021–2026 | Atalanta | 0 | (0) |
| 2021–2022 | → Reggina (loan) | 30 | (1) |
| 2022–2023 | → Hellas Verona (loan) | 1 | (0) |
| 2023 | → Cosenza (loan) | 12 | (0) |
| 2023–2026 | → Atalanta Under-23 (res.) | 44 | (5) |
| 2025 | → Triestina (loan) | 10 | (1) |
| 2026– | Monopoli | 1 | (0) |

International career^{‡}
| 2016 | Italy U15 | 9 | (0) |
| 2016–2017 | Italy U16 | 10 | (3) |
| 2017–2018 | Italy U17 | 16 | (0) |
| 2018–2019 | Italy U18 | 10 | (2) |
| 2019–2020 | Italy U19 | 7 | (0) |
| 2021 | Italy U20 | 4 | (1) |
| 2021 | Italy U21 | 1 | (0) |
- * Club domestic league appearances and goals as of 29 August 2026 ‡ National team caps and goals as of 18:53, 16 November 2021 (UTC)

Alessandro Cortinovis (born 25 January 2001) is an Italian professional footballer who plays as an attacking midfielder for Serie C Group C club Monopoli.

== Club career ==
Alessandro Cortinovis made his professional debut for Reggina on 11 September 2021.

On 22 July 2022, Cortinovis joined Serie A club Hellas Verona on a season-long loan. Having found limited game time, he was recalled by Atalanta: on 14 January 2023, he was subsequently loaned out to Serie C Group C side Cosenza until the end of the season.
