= Nico Abegglen =

Swiss footballer (born 1990)

Personal information
- Full name: Nico Abegglen
- Date of birth: 16 February 1990 (age 36)
- Place of birth: Switzerland
- Height: 1.74 m (5 ft 8 1/2 in)
- Position: Forward

Team information
- Current team: SC Brühl
- Number: 11

Youth career
- 2003–2008: FC St. Gallen

Senior career*
Years	Team	Apps	(Gls)
2008–2013	FC St. Gallen	106	(21)
2013–2015	FC Vaduz	43	(13)
2015–2017	FC Wohlen	35	(7)
2017–	SC Brühl	6	(2)

International career
2007–2008	Switzerland U18	4	(?)
2009	Switzerland U20	5	(2)
- * Club domestic league appearances and goals

Nico Abegglen (born 16 February 1990) is a Swiss professional footballer who plays as a forward for SC Brühl.

== Career ==
On 1 August 2007, Abegglen moved from FCSG U18 to St. Gallen U21. He played 2 years for youth career in U21 team. On 1 July 2009, Abegglen transferred to FC St. Gallen and played 3 seasons for team. He contracted with FC Vaduz on 25 February 2013. In 2015–16 season, Abegglen moved to FC Wohlen.
