= Jason Kodor =

Romanian professional footballer (born 2006)

Personal information
- Full name: Jason Patrick Vescan-Kodor
- Date of birth: 9 January 2006 (age 20)
- Place of birth: Bucharest, Romania
- Height: 1.95 m (6 ft 5 in)
- Position: Forward

Team information
- Current team: Rapid București
- Number: 77

Youth career
- –2021: CS Dinamo București
- 2021–2023: CA Oradea
- 2021–2022: → Sport Team București (loan)
- 2022–2023: → Lecce (loan)
- 2023–2026: Lecce

Senior career*
Years	Team	Apps	(Gls)
2026–	Rapid București	9	(0)

International career^{‡}
2023	Romania U17	4	(1)
2023	Romania U18	5	(1)
2024–2025	Romania U19	13	(0)
2025–	Romania U20	8	(1)
- * Club domestic league appearances and goals as of 7 November 2026 ‡ National team caps and goals as of 17 November 2026

Jason Patrick Vescan-Kodor (born 9 January 2006) is a Romanian professional footballer who plays as a forward for Liga I club Rapid București. Born in Bucharest, he holds dual Romanian and Australian citizenship.

== Club career ==
=== Early career ===
Kodor began his footballing education at CS Dinamo București. He later had spells at Sport Team București and CA Oradea. In 2022, he moved to Italy to join the youth academy of US Lecce. Over four years in the Italian club's youth system, he progressed from the Under-18 squad to the Primavera team, recording 33 goals in 109 matches.

=== Rapid București ===
On 29 June 2026, Kodor signed a three-year contract with Liga I club Rapid București. He made his professional senior debut on 20 July 2026 in a 1–0 home victory over Sepsi OSK.

== International career ==
Kodor has represented Romania at the Under-17, Under-18, Under-19, and Under-20 youth international levels. He was part of the Romania U19 squad that reached the semi-finals of the 2025 UEFA European Under-19 Championship.

== Career statistics ==
As of match played on 7 November 2026

Appearances and goals by club, season and competition
Club	Season	League			Cupa României		Europe		Other		Total	
Club	Season	Division	Apps	Goals	Apps	Goals	Apps	Goals	Apps	Goals	Apps	Goals
Rapid București	2026–27	Liga I	9	0	1	0	—		—		10	0
Career total			9	0	1	0	—		—		10	0
