= Bernardo Couto =

Portuguese footballer (born 2002)

Berna
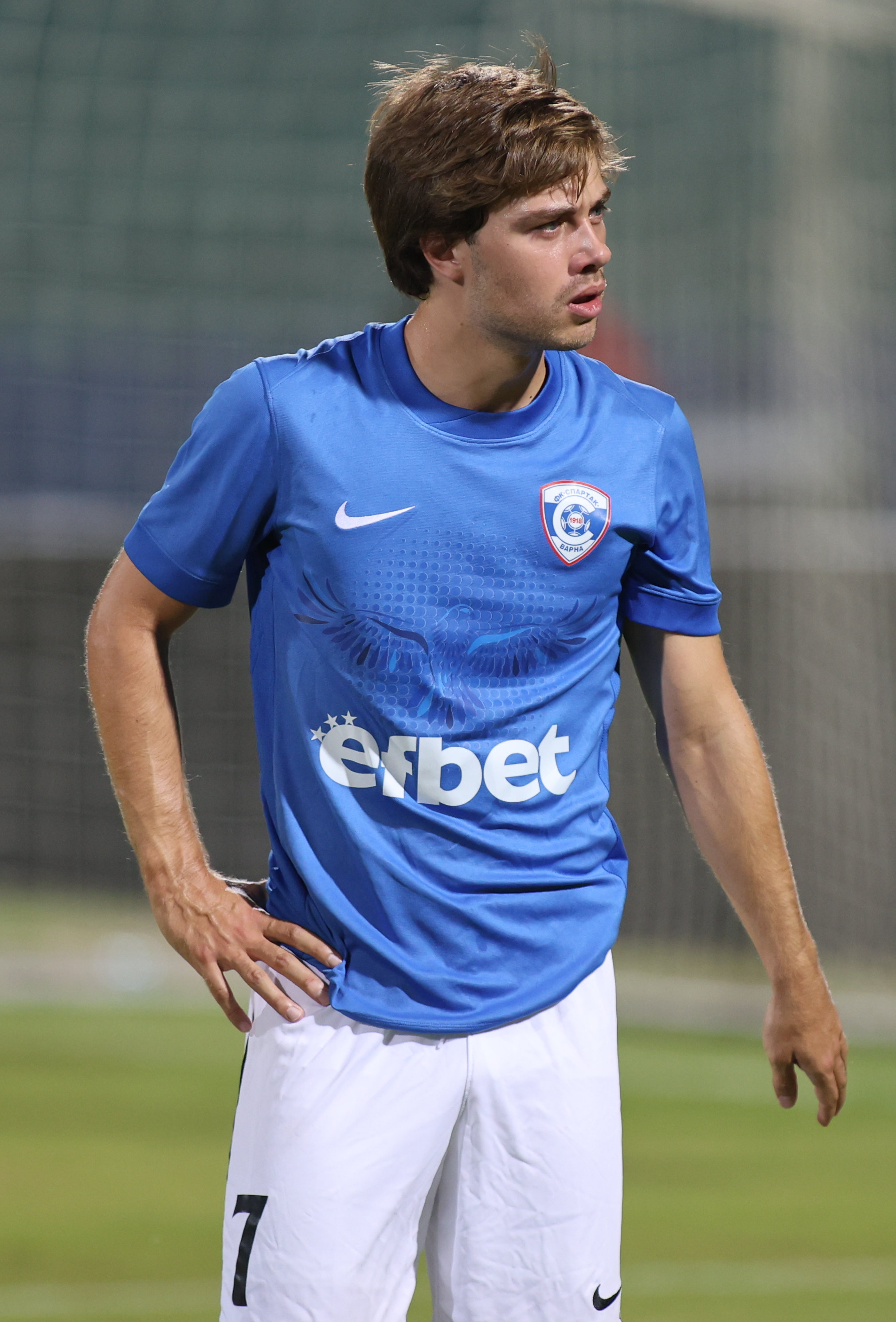

Personal information
- Full name: Bernardo Marques Duarte Couto
- Date of birth: 16 August 2002 (age 24)
- Place of birth: Braga, Portugal
- Height: 1.74 m (5 ft 9 in)
- Positions: Winger; attacking midfielder

Team information
- Current team: CSKA 1948
- Number: 7

Youth career
- 2010–2012: Póvoa de Lanhoso
- 2012–2021: Braga

Senior career*
Years	Team	Apps	(Gls)
2021–2023	Braga B	54	(5)
2022–2023	Braga	1	(0)
2023–2024	Trofense	23	(6)
2024–2025	Spartak Varna	53	(11)
2026–	CSKA 1948	1	(0)

International career
2019–2020	Portugal U18	10	(2)
2020	Portugal U19	1	(0)
2021–2022	Portugal U20	9	(2)
- * Club domestic league appearances and goals as of 11 June 2026

Bernardo Marques Duarte Couto (born 16 August 2002), known also as Berna, is a Portuguese professional footballer who plays as an attacking midfielder for Bulgarian First League club CSKA 1948 Sofia.

== Career ==
Berna spend his youth career at Braga. He made his professional debut for the team on 1 April 2022 in a league match against Benfica. On 21 May 2022 he signed his first professional contract with Braga, keeping him in the team until 2025. In July 2023 he moved to Trofense with Braga keeping 30% of his rights.

On 12 July 2024, he moved to Bulgarian First League club Spartak Varna. He scored his debut goal in the league on 23 October 2024 in a match against Lokomotiv Plovdiv, and was sent off seconds later, as he received a second yellow card for taking his shirt off.

== Career statistics ==
As of match played 7 November 2025

Appearances and goals by club, season and competition
Club	Season	League			Bulgarian Cup		Total	
Club	Season	Division	Apps	Goals	Apps	Goals	Apps	Goals
Spartak Varna	2024–25	Bulgarian First League	34	5	1	0	35	5
Spartak Varna	2025–26	Bulgarian First League	15	6	0	0	15	6
Career total			49	11	1	0	50	11
