= Skra Częstochowa =

Association football club

- Full name: Klub Sportowy Skra Częstochowa
- Nickname: Skrzacy
- Founded: 1926; 100 years ago
- Ground: Miejski Stadion Piłkarski
- Capacity: 990
- Chairman: Artur Szymczyk
- Manager: Tomasz Szymczak
- League: To be determined
- 2025–26: III liga, group III, 4th of 18
- Website: https://ks-skra.pl/
| Home colours | Away colours |

Skra Częstochowa is a Polish football club based in Częstochowa, founded in 1926.

== History ==
Poster advertising a 1947 Polish Football Championship game between Skra and Polonia Bytom

The club was founded in 1926. In 1946, Skra became the Częstochowa district champions and won promotion to the Polish championships played in the cup system. In the round of 16, the team lost 3–5 to Tęcza Kielce. In the 1947 season, Skra continued to play in the central games in the fight for the title of Polish Champion and qualification for the League in the 1948 season. The team took 7th place in the group, not being promoted to the league. Until 1952, the team played in the second league. From 1950 to 1954, the club operated under the name Ogniwo Częstochowa. Between 1953 and 1966, they competed in the third league. In 2018, the club was promoted to the II liga (third-tier), and won promotion to I liga three years later.

In July 2026, Skra withdrew from the upcoming 2026–27 III liga season due to financial problems.

== Naming history ==
- 1926 – Robotniczy Klub Sportowy (RKS) Skra Częstochowa
- 1950 – Ogniwo Częstochowa
- 1954 – Sparta Częstochowa
- 1955 – Skra Częstochowa
- 1974 – Międzyzakładowy Robotniczy Klub Sportowy (MRKS) Skra Barbara Częstochowa
- 1978 – MRKS Skra Komobex Częstochowa
- 1983 – MRKS Skra Częstochowa
- 2006 – Klub Sportowy (KS) Skra Częstochowa

== Players ==
=== Current squad ===
As of 14 September 2025

Note: Flags indicate national team as defined under FIFA eligibility rules; some limited exceptions apply. Players may hold more than one non-FIFA nationality.

| No. | Pos. | Nation | Player |
|---|---|---|---|
| 1 | GK | POL | Bartosz Warszakowski |
| 3 | DF | POL | Mateusz Lusiusz |
| 4 | DF | POL | Oliwier Kucharczyk |
| 5 | DF | POL | Jakub Mikołajczyk |
| 7 | MF | POL | Piotr Nocoń (captain) |
| 8 | MF | POL | Emanuel Gibała |
| 10 | MF | POL | Radosław Gołębiowski |
| 11 | MF | POL | Przemysław Sajdak |
| 13 | MF | POL | Kacper Garczarek |
| 15 | DF | POL | Łukasz Józefczyk |
| 16 | DF | POL | Nikodem Kossakowski |
| 18 | FW | POL | Konrad Waluda |

| No. | Pos. | Nation | Player |
|---|---|---|---|
| 19 | MF | POL | Tymoteusz Mazanek |
| 22 | DF | POL | Bartłomiej Zieliński (on loan from Raków Częstochowa II) |
| 23 | MF | POL | Szymon Jarek |
| 26 | MF | POL | Jerzy Napieraj |
| 28 | MF | POL | Seweryn Cieślak |
| 30 | GK | POL | Mateusz Górski |
| 37 | MF | POL | Zbigniew Wojciechowski |
| 53 | MF | POL | Borys Dmytryszyn |
| 77 | MF | POL | Paweł Kołodziejczyk |
| 97 | MF | POL | Jakub Łukasiewicz |
| 98 | FW | UKR | Ivan Metlushko |
| 99 | GK | POL | Oskar Fołtyński |

=== Former players ===
Jerzy Orłowski and Romuald Chojnacki played in the Poland national team, Titas Milašius played for the Lithuania national team.

== Honours ==
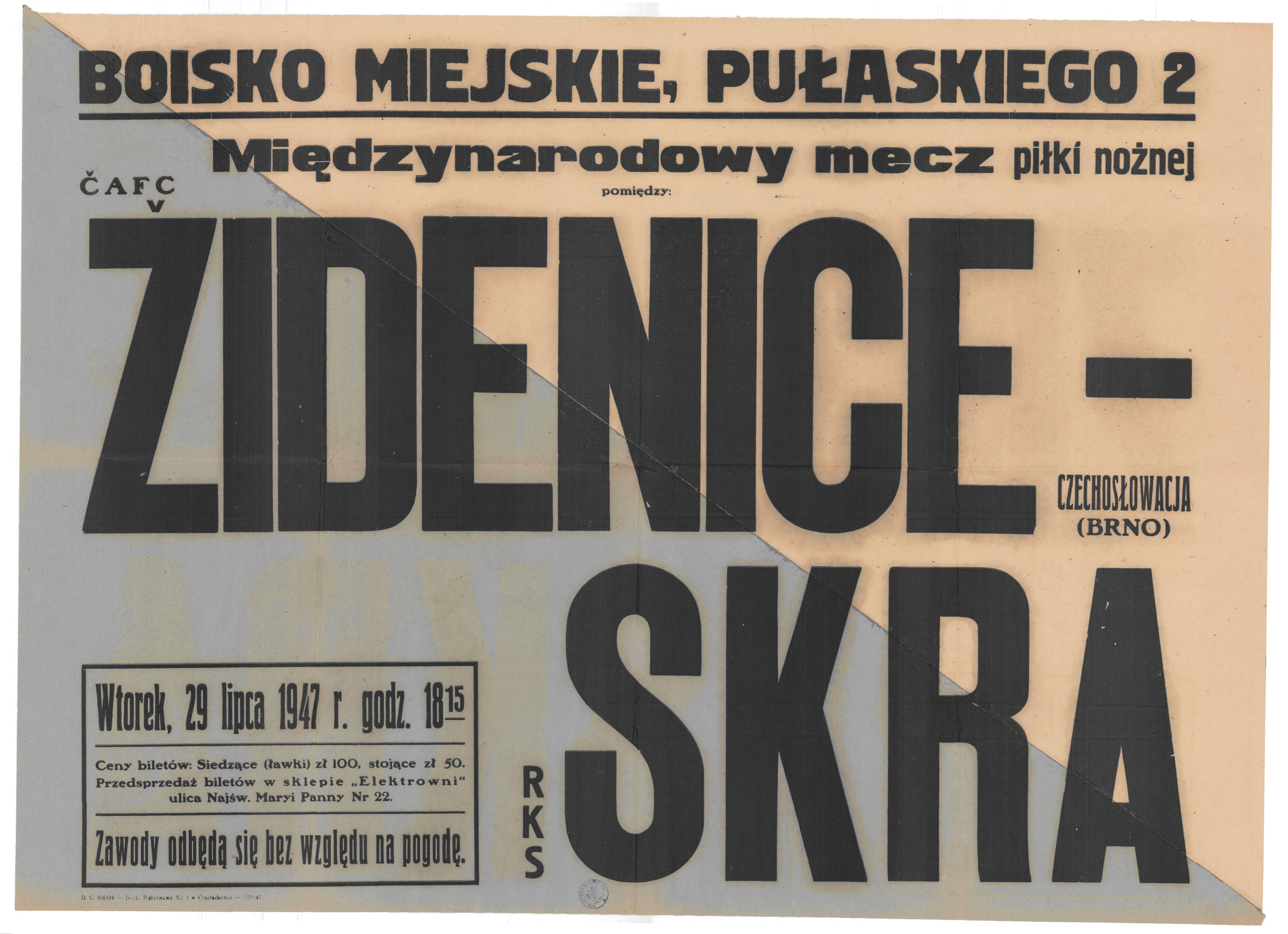
Poster of Skra's friendly match against ČAFC Židenice

- Polish Championship
  - Round of 16: 1946
  - 7th place in the group: 1947
- A Klasa, II Liga (Second Division)
  - 4th place in the final group: 1947–48
  - 4th place in the group: 1949
- Polish Cup
  - Round of 32: 2013–14 (reserve team), 2021–22

== Stadium ==
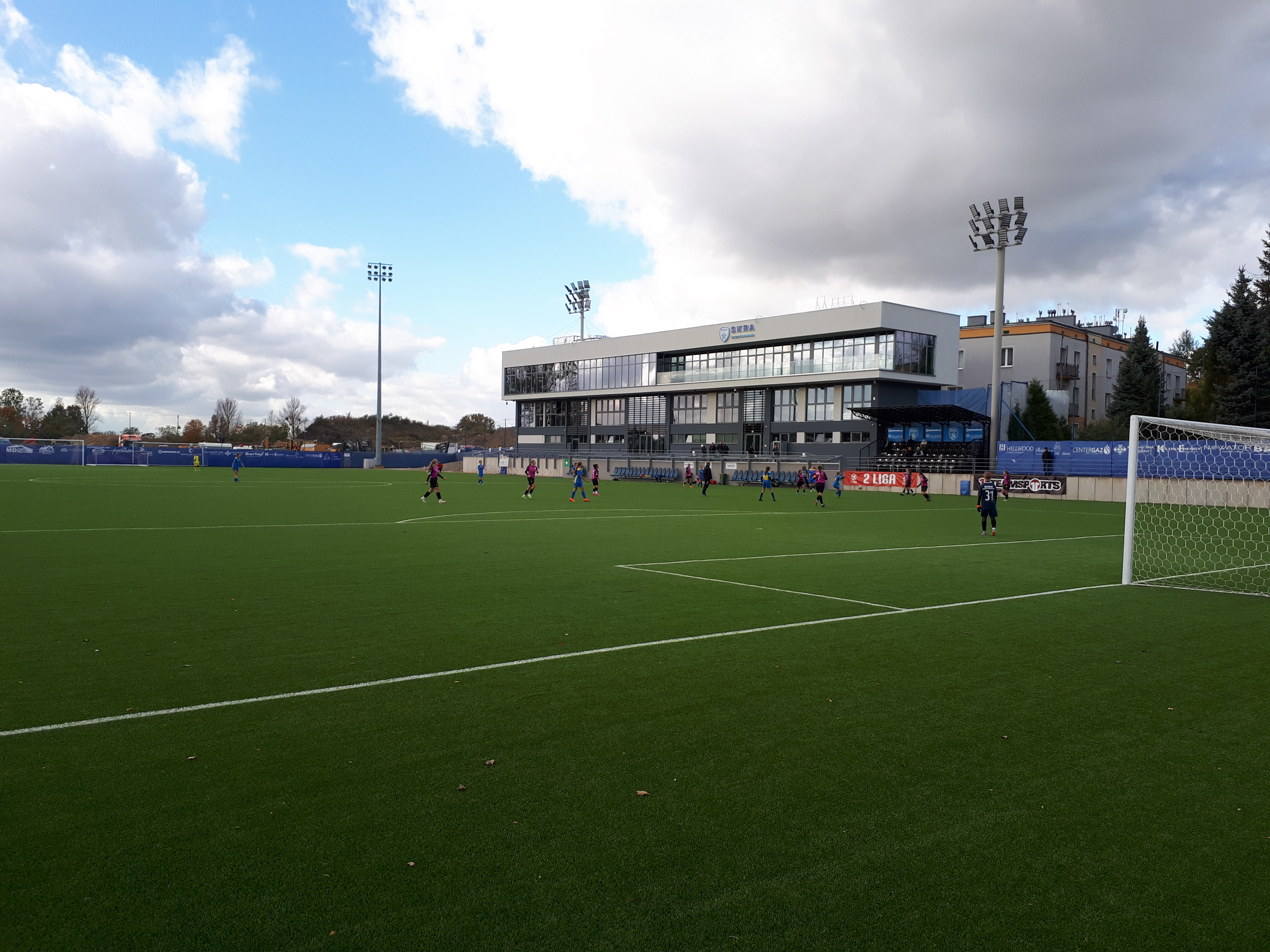
Skra stadium

Skra plays their home games at the Miejski Stadion Piłkarski Skra in Częstochowa, with capacity of 990. Because their stadium didn't meet the capacity requirements of the I liga, in the first part of the 2021–22 season they played every home match on the opponent's stadiums, as the home team. From 7 April 2022 to 8 April 2023, they hosted their games at a substitute stadium GIEKSA Arena in Bełchatów.
