= Polonia Środa Wielkopolska =

- Full name: Klub Sportowy Polonia Środa Wielkopolska
- Founded: 1 October 1919; 106 years ago
- Ground: Nowy Stadion Średzki
- Capacity: 1,100
- Chairman: Waldemar Grześkowiak
- Manager: Marcin Płuska
- League: III liga, group II
- 2025–26: III liga, group II, 3rd of 18
- Website: polonia-sroda.pl
Home colours	Away colours

Polonia Środa Wielkopolska is a Polish football club, based in Środa Wielkopolska, Greater Poland Voivodeship. Polonia competes in group II of the III liga, the fourth tier of Polish football. They play home games at the Nowy Stadion Średzki. The club also has field hockey and handball teams, and in the past had an interest in tennis.

== History ==
Polonia Środa Wielkopolska is a sports club founded on 1 October 1919. The first president was Adam Pankowski. In the second half of 1923, the club was caught up in financial trouble and in an attempt to rescue the club, chairman Tadeusz Mikolajczak changed the name from Polonia to Tabromik. The entity survived until 1930. On 28 November 1926, a group of former activists of the club convened a meeting to revive the club. President of the new entity was Stefan Kujawski, and the name was changed to Pogoń Środa Wielkopolska.

With the advent of World War II, the club suspended all activities. On 14 April 1945, a meeting was held which established the średzki Sports Club and on 9 June the name of Polonia was restored. In the 1950s, the club was renamed - initially it was named Unia and later Kolejarz Środa Wielkopolska. In 1957, the name was changed back to Polonia.

In the 1989–1990 season, players advanced to the regional league, and two years later to the macroregional league. As a result of a merger with Kotwica Kórnik, Polonia began playing in the third tier, operating under the name Kotwica-Polonia, with their stay there lasting four years. In 2011, the club earned promotion to the III liga.

== Honours ==
- III liga:
  - Champions: 2001–02 (Greater Poland North)
  - Third place: 2011–12 (group D), 2020–21 (group II) 2022–23
- IV liga Greater Poland
  - Champions: 2010–11 (North)
- Regional league
  - Champions: 2008–09 (group Poznań East)
- Polish Cup (Greater Poland regionals)
  - Winners: 2016–17, 2017–18, 2018–19, 2020–21, 2021–22, 2024–25, 2025–26
  - Finalists: 2015–16, 2019–20
- Polish Cup (Poznań regionals)
  - Winners: 1999–2000, 2008–09, 2014–15, 2015–16, 2016–17, 2017–18, 2018–19
- 4 seasons at the third level: 1993–94, 1994–95, 1995–96, 1996–97

== Current squad ==
As of 12 September 2025

Note: Flags indicate national team as defined under FIFA eligibility rules; some limited exceptions apply. Players may hold more than one non-FIFA nationality.

No.	Pos.	Nation	Player
1	GK	POL	Przemysław Frąckowiak (captain)
2	MF	POL	Michał Walczak
3	DF	POL	Borys Freilich
4	FW	POL	Jakub Kledecki
6	DF	ESP	Jonathan de Amo
7	FW	POL	Patryk Mikita
9	MF	POL	Mateusz Olejniczak
10	MF	POL	Bartosz Bartkowiak
11	MF	UKR	Ivan Sukhenko
12	GK	POL	Miłosz Garstkiewicz
15	DF	POL	Mateusz Pieńczak
16	MF	POL	Marcel Misztal
17	MF	POL	Mikołaj Kowalski
19	MF	POL	Tomasz Cywka

No.	Pos.	Nation	Player
21	MF	POL	Damian Kołtański
22	DF	POL	Piotr Skrobosiński
23	MF	POL	Mikołaj Stangel
24	MF	POL	Szymon Sarbinowski
25	FW	POL	Adam Krzos
27	DF	POL	Kamil Budych
29	DF	POL	Mateusz Maćkowiak
30	GK	POL	Jakub Pawlaczyk
47	MF	POL	Rafał Steczyński
66	DF	POL	Marcin Skrobich
77	DF	POL	Gracjan Hyl
80	MF	POL	Jakub Szczypek
98	DF	POL	Filip Nawrocki
