= Filipe Cruz (footballer) =

Portuguese footballer

Personal information
- Full name: Filipe Miguel Nicolácia da Cruz
- Date of birth: 19 February 2002 (age 24)
- Place of birth: Faro, Portugal
- Height: 1.79 m (5 ft 10 in)
- Position: Right-back

Team information
- Current team: Felgueiras
- Number: 17

Youth career
- 2010–2011: Portimão
- 2011–2014: Loulé
- 2014–2021: Benfica

Senior career*
Years	Team	Apps	(Gls)
2020–2025	Benfica B	66	(3)
2025–	Felgueiras	17	(0)

International career^{‡}
2018	Portugal U16	9	(2)
2018–2019	Portugal U17	16	(2)
2019–2020	Portugal U18	6	(1)
2020	Portugal U19	1	(0)
2021–2022	Portugal U20	9	(3)
- * Club domestic league appearances and goals as of 20 June 2026 ‡ National team caps and goals as of 23:42, 14 November 2023 (UTC)

Filipe Miguel Nicolácia da Cruz (born 19 February 2002) is a Portuguese professional footballer who plays as a right-back for Liga Portugal 2 club Felgueiras.

== Playing career ==
On 26 February 2018, Cruz signed his first professional contract with Benfica. Cruz made his professional debut with Benfica B in a 2-0 Liga Portugal 2 loss to C.D. Feirense on 5 December 2020.
