= Italy national under-20 football team =

National under-20 association football team representing Italy

Italy Under-20
- Nickname: Gli Azzurrini
- Association: Italian Football Federation (Federazione Italiana Giuoco Calcio – FIGC)
- Head coach: Carmine Nunziata
- Captain: Mattia Mannini
First colours	Second colours

FIFA U-20 World Cup
- Appearances: 9 (first in 1977)
- Best result: Runners-up (2023)

Under 20 Elite League
- Appearances: 6 (first in 2017–18)
- Best result: Winner (2021–22, 2022–23, 2023–24)

Italy national under-20 football team is the national under-20 football team of Italy and is controlled by the Italian Football Federation.

The team competes for the Under 20 Elite League, held annually and, if qualified, for the FIFA U-20 World Cup, held every two years.

== History ==
The Under-20 team is de facto based on the previous year's Under-19 team and acts mainly as a support team for the Under-21 selection, providing further international experience for young selectable players.

The team competes for its only official tournament, the FIFA U-20 World Cup, depending on the U19s results at the UEFA European Under-19 Championship held in the even-numbered years, that qualifies European teams for the U-20 World Cup.

The best result obtained by the Italian team in the U-20 World Cup is the second place achieved in the 2023 edition held in Argentina, losing the final 1–0 against Uruguay. They finished also third in 2017 and fourth in 2019. Italy managed to qualify for the first time for three consecutive U-20 World Cups after qualifying for the 2021 edition, but the event was cancelled due to the COVID-19 pandemic.

Each season the team mainly participates in friendly tournaments, in which overage players may also be selected. The U20 team participated until 2017 in the annual Four Nations Tournament with Germany, Switzerland and Poland (which replaced Austria). Since the 2017–18 season, the Italy U20 team participates in the annual Under 20 Elite League, expanded to 8 participants.

The team also had an annual fixture with the Serie D Best XI after the end of the season.

== FIFA U-20 World Cup ==
Year	Result	GP	W	D	L	GS	GA
(Tunisia) 1977	Group stage	3	0	2	1	1	3
(Japan) 1979	Did not qualify						
(Australia) 1981	Group stage	3	0	0	3	1	6
(Mexico) 1983	Did not qualify						
(Soviet Union) 1985	Did not qualify						
(Chile) 1987	Quarter-finals	4	2	1	1	5	3
(Saudi Arabia) 1989	Did not qualify						
(Portugal) 1991	Did not qualify						
(Australia) 1993	Did not qualify						
(Qatar) 1995	Did not qualify						
(Malaysia) 1997	Did not qualify						
(Nigeria) 1999	Did not qualify						
(Argentina) 2001	Did not qualify						
(United Arab Emirates) 2003	Did not qualify						
(Netherlands) 2005	Quarter-finals	5	2	1*	2	10	8
(Canada) 2007	Did not qualify						
(Egypt) 2009	Quarter-finals	5	2	1	2	9	9
(Colombia) 2011	Did not qualify						
(Turkey) 2013	Did not qualify						
(New Zealand) 2015	Did not qualify						
(South Korea) 2017	Third place	7	3	2*	2	10	9
(Poland) 2019	Fourth place	7	4	1	2	8	5
(Indonesia) ~~2021~~	Cancelled						
(Argentina) 2023	Runners-up	7	5	0	2	13	8
(Chile) 2025	Round of 16	4	1	1	2	3	6
(Azerbaijan) (Uzbekistan) 2027	Did not qualify						
(Armenia) (Georgia (country)) 2029	To be determined						
Total:9/26	Runners-up	45	19	9	17	60	57

*Draws includes knockout matches decided on penalty shootouts.

== Current squad ==
The following players were called up for the friendly match against England on 27 March 2026.

No.	Pos.	Player	Date of birth (age)	Club
	GK	Tommaso Martinelli	6 January 2006 (age 20)	(Italian Football Federation) Fiorentina
	GK	Lapo Siviero	23 November 2006 (age 19)	(Italian Football Federation) Torino
	DF	Mike Aidoo	30 May 2005 (age 21)	(Italian Football Federation) Pergolettese
	DF	Adam Bakoune	6 February 2006 (age 20)	(Italian Football Federation) Monza
	DF	Cristian Cama	5 June 2007 (age 19)	(Italian Football Federation) Roma
	DF	Christian Corradi	21 February 2005 (age 21)	(Italian Football Federation) Trento
	DF	Filippo Pagnucco	9 February 2006 (age 20)	(Italian Football Federation) Juventus Next Gen
	DF	Filippo Reale	24 February 2006 (age 20)	(Italian Football Federation) Juve Stabia
	DF	Lorenzo Romani	28 February 2005 (age 21)	(Italian Football Federation) Lecco
	DF	Giacomo Stabile	12 April 2005 (age 21)	(Italian Football Federation) Bari
	MF	Aaron Ciammaglichella	26 January 2005 (age 21)	(Italian Football Federation) Juve Stabia
	MF	Leonardo Colombo	4 June 2005 (age 21)	(Italian Football Federation) Monza
	MF	Giacomo De Pieri	29 December 2006 (age 19)	(Italian Football Federation) Juve Stabia
	MF	Luca Di Maggio	31 March 2005 (age 21)	(Italian Football Federation) Padova
	MF	Patrick Nuamah	31 December 2005 (age 20)	(Italian Football Federation) Catanzaro
	MF	Fabio Rispoli	28 September 2006 (age 20)	(Italian Football Federation) Catanzaro
	FW	Federico Cassa	1 February 2006 (age 20)	(Italian Football Federation) Atalanta U23
	FW	Matteo Lavelli	8 December 2006 (age 19)	(Italian Football Federation) Inter Milan U23
	FW	Alvin Okoro	26 March 2005 (age 21)	(Italian Football Federation) Juve Stabia
	FW	Simone Pafundi	14 March 2006 (age 20)	(Italian Football Federation) Sampdoria
	FW	Emanuele Rao	28 March 2006 (age 20)	(Italian Football Federation) Bari
	FW	Dominic Vavassori	9 December 2005 (age 20)	(Italian Football Federation) Atalanta U23

== Head-to-head record ==
The following table shows Italy's head-to-head record in the FIFA U-20 World Cup.

Opponent	Pld	W	D	L	GF	GA	GD	Win %
Argentina	1	0	0	1	0	1	−1	0.00
Australia	1	1	0	0	1	0	+1	100.00
Brazil	4	2	0	2	4	5	−1	50.00
Canada	2	1	1	0	6	3	+3	50.00
Chile	1	0	0	1	0	1	−1	0.00
Colombia	2	1	0	1	3	3	+0	50.00
Cuba	1	0	1	0	2	2	+0	0.00
Dominican Republic	1	1	0	0	3	0	+3	100.00
Ecuador	2	1	0	1	1	1	+0	50.00
Egypt	1	0	0	1	2	4	−2	0.00
England	2	1	0	1	3	4	−1	50.00
France	1	1	0	0	2	1	+1	100.00
Hungary	1	0	0	1	2	3	−1	0.00
Iran	1	0	1	0	0	0	+0	0.00
Ivory Coast	1	0	1	0	1	1	+0	0.00
Japan	2	0	2	0	2	2	+0	0.00
Mali	1	1	0	0	4	2	+2	100.00
Mexico	1	1	0	0	2	1	+1	100.00
Morocco	1	0	1	0	2	2	+0	0.00
Nigeria	2	1	0	1	2	2	+0	50.00
Paraguay	1	0	1	0	0	0	+0	0.00
Poland	1	1	0	0	1	0	+1	100.00
Romania	1	0	0	1	0	1	−1	0.00
South Africa	1	1	0	0	2	0	+2	100.00
South Korea	2	1	0	1	3	5	−2	50.00
Spain	1	1	0	0	3	1	+2	100.00
Syria	1	0	0	1	1	2	−1	0.00
Trinidad and Tobago	1	1	0	0	2	1	+1	100.00
Ukraine	1	0	0	1	0	1	−1	0.00
United States	2	1	0	1	3	4	−1	50.00
Uruguay	3	0	1	2	0	2	−2	0.00
Zambia	1	1	0	0	3	2	+1	100.00
Total	45	19	9	17	60	57	+3	42.22

== See also ==
- Italy national under-21 football team
- Italy national under-19 football team
- FIFA U-20 World Cup
