= Romania national under-20 football team =

National U-20 association football team

Romania U-20
- Nickname: Tricolorii (The Tricolours)
- Association: Federația Română de Fotbal
- Confederation: UEFA (Europe)
- Head coach: Adrian Iencsi
- Captain: Darius Fălcușan
- Most caps: Eduard Radaslavescu (15)
- Top scorer: Atanas Trică & Eduard Radaslavescu (4)
- FIFA code: ROU
First colours	Second colours	Third colours

The Romania national under-20 football team represents Romania in international football at this age level and is controlled by Federația Română de Fotbal, the governing body for football in Romania.

== Honours ==
- FIFA U-20 World Cup:
  - Third Place (1): 1981

== Individual awards ==
Year	Golden Ball
(Australia) 1981	Romulus Gabor

== Results and fixtures ==
The following is a list of match results from the last 12 months, as well as any future matches that have been scheduled.

Win Draw Loss Fixture

17 November 2025 Elite League	Portugal	1–1	Romania	Évora, Portugal
19:30 CET (UTC+01:00)	Fălcușan 14' (o.g.)	Report	Fălcușan 25'	Stadium: Estadio Juventude Sport Clube; Referee: Diogo Rosa (Portugal)

27 March 2026 Elite League	Romania	0–1	Poland	Târgoviște, Romania
17:30 CET (UTC+01:00)		Report	Barczak 73'	Stadium: Eugen Popescu Stadium; Referee: Andrei Vremăroiu (Romania)

31 March 2026 Elite League	Switzerland	3–1	Romania	Vevey, Switzerland
13:30 CET (UTC+01:00)	Xhemalija 68'; Tritten 83' (pen.); Jordan 89'	Report	Jălade 79'	Stadium: Stade de Copet; Referee: Zrinko Prskalo (Switzerland)

13 November 2026 Elite League	Switzerland	3–1	Romania	Bellinzona, Switzerland
20:30 CET (UTC+01:00)	Mardochée 3'; Tsimba 55'; Atangana 89'	Report	Băsceanu 78'	Stadium: Stadio Comunale

17 November 2026 Elite League	Romania	0–1	Poland	Târgoviște, Romania
19:00 CET (UTC+01:00)		Report	Śmiglewski 83' (pen.)	Stadium: Eugen Popescu Stadium; Referee: Andrei Vremăroiu (Romania)

26 March 2027 Elite League	Portugal	–	Romania

29 March 2027 Elite League	Romania	–	Czech Republic

== Players ==
=== Current squad ===
The following players were named in the squad for the 2026–27 Under 20 Elite League matches against Switzerland and Poland on 13 and 17 November 2026, respectively.

Caps and goals correct as of 17 November 2026, after the match against Poland.

No.	Pos.	Player	Date of birth (age)	Caps	Goals	Club
	GK	Codruț Sandu	17 April 2006 (age 20)	6	0	(Romanian Football Federation) Corvinul Hunedoara
	GK	Rafael Munteanu	1 March 2006 (age 20)	2	0	(Romanian Football Federation) Farul Constanța
	GK	Bogdan Ungureanu	1 April 2007 (age 19)	0	0	(Romanian Football Federation) Rapid București
	DF	Darius Fălcușan	14 February 2006 (age 20)	8	1	(Romanian Football Federation) Concordia Chiajna
	DF	Mario Bărăitaru	8 December 2006 (age 19)	6	0	(Romanian Football Federation) Slatina
	DF	David Irimia	12 May 2006 (age 20)	6	0	(Romanian Football Federation) Dinamo București
	DF	Alin Chinteș	7 February 2006 (age 20)	4	0	(Romanian Football Federation) Universitatea Cluj
	DF	Ricardo Pădurariu	23 May 2007 (age 19)	2	0	(Romanian Football Federation) FCSB
	DF	Florin Gașpăr	25 September 2007 (age 19)	1	0	(Romanian Football Federation) Chindia Târgoviște
	DF	Alexandru Miloiu	29 March 2009 (age 17)	0	0	(Italian Football Federation) Lazio
	DF	Andrei Racu	31 March 2007 (age 19)	0	0	(Italian Football Federation) Bassano
	DF	Aurel Vlaicu	1 August 2006 (age 20)	0	0	(Romanian Football Federation) Politehnica Timișoara
	MF	Remus Guțea	2 November 2006 (age 20)	8	0	(Romanian Football Federation) Voluntari
	MF	Luca Băsceanu	17 May 2006 (age 20)	5	2	(Romanian Football Federation) Universitatea Craiova
	MF	David Matei	19 July 2006 (age 20)	4	0	(Romanian Football Federation) Universitatea Craiova
	MF	Ianis Tarbă	4 July 2006 (age 20)	4	0	(Romanian Football Federation) Dinamo București
	MF	Yanis Pîrvu	2 April 2007 (age 19)	2	0	(Romanian Football Federation) Argeș Pitești
	MF	Robert Lăpădătescu	8 November 2006 (age 20)	2	0	(Romanian Football Federation) Slatina
	MF	Lorenzo Biliboc	22 October 2006 (age 20)	1	0	(Romanian Football Federation) CFR Cluj
	MF	Raul Vereș	14 July 2007 (age 19)	0	0	(Royal Spanish Football Federation) Las Rozas
	FW	Jason Kodor	9 January 2006 (age 20)	8	1	(Romanian Football Federation) Rapid București
	FW	Iustin Doicaru	7 February 2007 (age 19)	2	0	(Turkish Football Federation) Rizespor
	FW	Ioan Vermeșan	18 October 2006 (age 20)	2	0	(Polish Football Association) Widzew Łódź
	FW	Alexandru Stoian	15 December 2007 (age 18)	1	0	(Romanian Football Federation) FCSB

=== Recent call-ups ===
Players born in or after 2006 are eligible for the 2026–27 Under 20 Elite League.

The following players have also been called up in the past to the Romania under-20 squad and remain eligible to play:

Pos.	Player	Date of birth (age)	Caps	Goals	Club	Latest call-up
GK	Máté Simon	19 July 2006 (age 20)	1	0	(Romania) Csíkszereda	v. Switzerland, 31 March 2026
GK	Alexandru Maxim	23 January 2007 (age 19)	0	0	(Romania) Universitatea Craiova	v. Switzerland, 31 March 2026
GK	Iustin Chirilă	21 May 2006 (age 20)	2	0	(Romania) Bihor Oradea	v. Portugal, 17 November 2025
DF	Emanuel Marincău	7 April 2006 (age 20)	6	0	(Germany) Mainz 05 II	v. Switzerland, 31 March 2026
DF	Raul Marița	27 September 2006 (age 20)	4	0	(Germany) Greuther Fürth II	v. Switzerland, 31 March 2026
DF	Narcis Ilaș	27 March 2007 (age 19)	2	0	(Romania) Botoșani	v. Switzerland, 31 March 2026
DF	Adrian Iancu	3 November 2006 (age 20)	1	0	(Romania) ASA Târgu Mureș	v. Switzerland, 31 March 2026
DF	Răzvan Creț	23 May 2006 (age 20)	1	0	(Romania) Botoșani	v. Switzerland, 31 March 2026
DF	Răzvan Călugăr	6 April 2006 (age 20)	0	0	(Romania) ASA Târgu Mureș	v. Poland, 27 March 2026
DF	Ionuț Cercel	14 November 2006 (age 20)	1	0	(Romania) Farul Constanța	v. Portugal, 17 November 2025
DF	Ștefan Senciuc	2 April 2006 (age 20)	1	0	(Romania) Rapid București	v. Czech Republic, 13 October 2025
MF	David Păcuraru	17 February 2006 (age 20)	6	0	(Romania) Farul Constanța	v. Switzerland, 31 March 2026
MF	Alexandru Irimia	12 May 2006 (age 20)	1	0	(Romania) Metaloglobus București	v. Switzerland, 31 March 2026
MF	David Paraschiv	28 September 2006 (age 20)	1	0	(Romania) Petrolul Ploiești	v. Portugal, 17 November 2025
FW	David Barbu	26 June 2006 (age 20)	6	1	(Romania) Universitatea Craiova	v. Switzerland, 31 March 2026
FW	Gabriel Gheorghe	12 October 2006 (age 20)	1	0	(Romania) Argeș Pitești	v. Switzerland, 31 March 2026
FW	Ianis Vencu	12 November 2006 (age 20)	0	0	(Romania) Voluntari	v. Switzerland, 31 March 2026

Notes

- ^{INJ} = Player withdrew from the squad due to an injury
- ^{SUS} = Player is serving suspension
- ^{WD} = Player withdrew from the squad
- Names in italics denote players that have been capped for the Senior team.

== Coaching staff ==
Role	Name
Head Coach	(Romania) Adrian Iencsi
Goalkeeping coach	(Romania) Silviu Lung

== Head-to-head record ==
The following table shows Romania's head-to-head record in the FIFA U-20 World Cup.

Role	Opponent	Name	Pld	W	D	L	GF	GA	GD	Win %	1	1	0	0	1	0	+1	100.00
Germany	1	0	0	1	0	1	−1	0.00										
Italy	1	1	0	0	1	0	+1	100.00										
South Korea	1	1	0	0	1	0	+1	100.00										
Uruguay	1	1	0	0	2	1	+1	100.00										
Total	6	4	1	1	6	3	+3	66.67										

== See also ==
- Romania national football team
- Romania national under-21 football team
- Romania national under-19 football team
- Romania national under-17 football team
- Romania national under-16 football team
- FIFA U-20 World Cup
