= Poland national under-20 football team =

Sports team

Poland Under-20
- Nickname(s): Biało-czerwoni (The White and Reds); Białe Orły (The White Eagles)
- Association: Polish Football Association (Polski Związek Piłki Nożnej)
- Confederation: UEFA (Europe)
- Head coach: Miłosz Stępiński
- FIFA code: POL
First colours	Second colours

FIFA U-20 World Cup
- Appearances: 5 (first in 1979)
- Best result: Third place (1983)

The Poland national under-20 football team represents Poland in association football at an under-20 age level and is controlled by Polish Football Association, the governing body for football in Poland.

== Competitive record ==
*Denotes draws include knockout matches decided on penalty kicks.
Gold background colour indicates that the tournament was won.
Silver background colour indicates second-place finish.
Bronze background colour indicates third-place finish.
Red border color indicates tournament was held on home soil.

=== FIFA U-20 World Cup ===
FIFA U-20 World Cup record
Year	Round	Pld	W	D	L	GF	GA
(Tunisia) 1977	did not qualify						
(Japan) 1979	Fourth place	6	2	2	2	10	6
(Australia) 1981	Group stage	3	1	0	2	4	2
(Mexico) 1983	Third place	6	4	0	2	13	7
(Soviet Union) 1985	qualified, but did not enter						
(Chile) 1987	did not qualify						
(Saudi Arabia) 1989	did not qualify						
(Portugal) 1991	did not qualify						
(Australia) 1993	did not qualify						
(Qatar) 1995	did not qualify						
(Malaysia) 1997	did not qualify						
(Nigeria) 1999	did not qualify						
(Argentina) 2001	did not qualify						
(United Arab Emirates) 2003	did not qualify						
(Netherlands) 2005	did not qualify						
(Canada) 2007	Round of 16	4	1	1	2	4	10
(Egypt) 2009	did not qualify						
(Colombia) 2011	did not qualify						
(Turkey) 2013	did not qualify						
(New Zealand) 2015	did not qualify						
(South Korea) 2017	did not qualify						
(Poland) 2019	Round of 16	4	1	1	2	5	3
(Argentina) 2023	did not qualify						
(Chile) 2025	did not qualify						
(Azerbaijan) (Uzbekistan) 2027	did not qualify						
(Armenia) (Georgia (country)) 2029	to be determined						
Total	Best: Third place	23	9	4	10	36	28

== Road to FIFA U-20 World Cup 2007 ==
With the 2006 UEFA European Under-19 Championship hosted on home soil, the tournament started badly for Poland, with a demoralizing 0–1 loss to Austria. However, the players roused themselves for their crucial second fixture and registered a convincing 4–1 victory over Belgium. A semi-final berth was at stake in the final group fixture against the Czech Republic, but the hopes of qualifying for the final four evaporated in a 0–2 defeat to the Czechs. The Poles had done enough to secure a third-place finish in Group A, and with it, a ticket to the 2007 FIFA U-20 World Cup.

== Road to FIFA U-20 World Cup 2019 ==
Being the host of the tournament, Poland automatically qualified. With an inexperienced youth squad, having previously unable to qualify for any major U-19 European Championship and only competed in much smaller Under 20 Elite League, Poland put the tournament with pressure. They were grouped with Colombia, Senegal and Tahiti.

Poland managed to finish third in their group, after managing a lone 5–0 win over Tahiti and holding Senegal goalless draw, previously lost 0–2 to Colombia. This helped Poland to qualify to the round of sixteen, where they were unfortunate to face juggernaut Italy. Despite its resistance, Poland still lost by a penalty, thus for the second time Poland was eliminated from the round of sixteen.

== Results and fixtures ==
The following is a list of match results from the last 12 months, as well as any future matches that have been scheduled.

Win Draw Loss Fixture

27 March 2026 Elite League	Romania	0–1	Poland	Târgoviște, Romania
16:30 CET (UTC+01:00)		Report	Barczak 73'	Stadium: Eugen Popescu Stadium; Referee: Andrei Vremăroiu (Romania)

31 March 2026 Elite League	Poland	0–1	Germany	Lublin, Poland
16:45 CEST (UTC+02:00)		Report	Müller 90'	Stadium: Arena Lublin; Attendance: 15,200; Referee: Albert Różycki (Poland)

26 September 2026 Elite League	Portugal	1–3	Poland	Algarve, Portugal
18:00 CEST (UTC+02:00)	Silva 44'	Report	Kurowski 21'; Barański 83'; Basse 85'	Referee: Flávio Duarte (Portugal)

29 September 2026 Elite League	Poland	2–0	Czech Republic	Albufeira, Portugal
18:00 CEST (UTC+02:00)	Bzdyl 74'; Śmiglewski 90' (pen.)	Report		Stadium: Estádio da Nora

13 November 2026 Elite League	Poland	1–2	Germany	Białystok, Poland
20:00 CET (UTC+01:00)	Bzdyl 18'	90minut	Meyer 84'; da Silva Moreira 90'	Stadium: Chorten Arena; Referee: Damian Krumplewski (Poland)

17 November 2026 Elite League	Romania	0–1	Poland	Târgoviște, Romania
18:00 CET (UTC+01:00)		Report	Śmiglewski 83' (pen.)	Stadium: Eugen Popescu Stadium; Referee: Andrei Vremăroiu (Romania)

26 March 2027 Elite League	Poland	v	England

30 March 2027 Elite League	Italy	v	Poland

== Players ==
=== Current squad ===
The following players were called up for the Elite League matches against Germany and Romania on 13 and 17 November 2026.

Caps and goals updated as of 17 November 2026 after the match against Romania. Names in italics denote players who have been capped for the senior team.

No.	Pos.	Player	Date of birth (age)	Caps	Goals	Club
1	DF	Wojciech Banasik	8 May 2006 (age 20)	0	0	(Polish Football Association) Polonia Bytom
22	GK	Miłosz Piekutowski	8 May 2006 (age 20)	3	0	(French Football Federation) RC Strasbourg
2	DF	Dominik Szala	24 April 2006 (age 20)	6	0	(Polish Football Association) Śląsk Wrocław
3	DF	Krzysztof Fałowski	6 April 2007 (age 19)	4	0	(Polish Football Association) ŁKS Łódź
4	DF	Igor Orlikowski	9 February 2006 (age 20)	5	0	(Polish Football Association) Zagłębie Lubin
14	DF	Aleksander Gołoś	24 August 2007 (age 19)	1	0	(Polish Football Association) Polonia Warsaw
23	DF	Michał Synoś	26 February 2007 (age 19)	1	0	(Polish Football Association) Bruk-Bet Termalica Nieciecza
	DF	Dawid Bembnista	12 January 2007 (age 19)	0	0	(Italian Football Federation) Empoli
5	MF	Jakub Zbróg	15 July 2007 (age 19)	1	0	(Polish Football Association) Pogoń Grodzisk Mazowiecki
6	MF	Eryk Grzywacz	24 March 2006 (age 20)	8	0	(German Football Association) TSV Havelse
7	MF	Karol Borys	28 September 2006 (age 20)	7	0	(Polish Football Association) Śląsk Wrocław
8	MF	Maciej Wojciechowski	17 May 2007 (age 19)	4	0	(Polish Football Association) Pogoń Szczecin
10	MF	Bartłomiej Barański	9 October 2006 (age 20)	8	2	(Polish Football Association) Odra Opole
11	MF	Fabian Bzdyl	2 December 2007 (age 18)	4	2	(Slovak Football Association) Žilina
13	MF	Jakub Adkonis	10 June 2007 (age 19)	4	0	(Polish Football Association) Lechia Gdańsk
15	MF	Kuba Solecki	9 February 2007 (age 19)	2	0	(Polish Football Association) Arka Gdynia
16	MF	Oliwier Maziarz	12 May 2006 (age 20)	3	0	(Polish Football Association) Piast Gliwice
17	MF	Jakub Jendryka	20 November 2006 (age 19)	4	0	(Polish Football Association) Raków Częstochowa
20	MF	Mateusz Dziewiatowski	28 June 2007 (age 19)	1	0	(Polish Football Association) Zagłębie Lubin
9	FW	Kacper Śmiglewski	7 January 2005 (age 21)	12	4	(Polish Football Association) Cracovia
18	FW	Bartosz Martosz	11 November 2006 (age 20)	4	0	(Polish Football Association) Podbeskidzie Bielsko-Biała
19	FW	Adam Basse	4 November 2007 (age 19)	4	1	(Polish Football Association) Raków Częstochowa
21	FW	Maciej Soboczyński	30 January 2007 (age 19)	2	0	(Norwegian Football Federation) Rosenborg

=== Recent call-ups ===
The following players (born in 2005 or later) have previously been called up to the Poland under-20 squad in the last 12 months and are still eligible to represent:

Pos.	Player	Date of birth (age)	Caps	Goals	Club	Latest call-up
GK	Axel Holewiński	22 February 2006 (age 20)	2	0	(Poland) Lechia Gdańsk	v. Czech Republic, 29 September 2026
GK	Antoni Mikułko	11 February 2005 (age 21)	3	0	(Poland) Wieczysta Kraków	v. Germany, 31 March 2026
GK	Patryk Letkiewicz	24 September 2005 (age 21)	1	0	(Poland) Wisła Kraków	v. Germany, 31 March 2026
DF	Krzysztof Kurowski	29 August 2006 (age 20)	2	1	(Netherlands) Twente	v. Romania, 17 November 2026 ^{INJ}
DF	Konrad Ciszek	4 October 2007 (age 19)	2	0	(Poland) Korona Kielce	v. Czech Republic, 29 September 2026
DF	Jan Leszczyński	12 April 2007 (age 19)	2	0	(Germany) Borussia Mönchengladbach	v. Czech Republic, 29 September 2026
DF	Kacper Wołowiec	15 October 2007 (age 19)	2	0	(Poland) Puszcza Niepołomice	v. Czech Republic, 29 September 2026
DF	Nikodem Leśniak-Paduch	12 January 2006 (age 20)	3	0	(Poland) Ruch Chorzów	v. Portugal, 26 September 2026 ^{U21}
DF	Jakub Lewicki	17 September 2005 (age 21)	7	0	(Poland) Piast Gliwice	v. Germany, 31 March 2026
DF	Jakub Krzyżanowski	19 January 2006 (age 20)	5	0	(Poland) Wisła Kraków	v. Germany, 31 March 2026
DF	Paskal Meyer	25 June 2005 (age 21)	5	0	(Poland) Motor Lublin	v. Germany, 31 March 2026
DF	Kacper Przybyłko	5 February 2005 (age 21)	4	0	(Poland) Puszcza Niepołomice	v. Germany, 31 March 2026
DF	Bartosz Dembek	3 January 2006 (age 20)	1	0	(Poland) Pogoń Grodzisk Mazowiecki	v. Germany, 31 March 2026
MF	Eryk Kozłowski	27 September 2006 (age 20)	4	0	(Poland) Jagiellonia Białystok	v. Czech Republic, 29 September 2026
MF	Kamil Nowogoński	18 February 2007 (age 19)	2	0	(Poland) Zagłębie Lubin	v. Czech Republic, 29 September 2026
MF	Mateusz Szczepaniak	5 January 2007 (age 19)	1	0	(Poland) Legia Warsaw	v. Czech Republic, 29 September 2026
MF	Oliwier Kwiatkowski	2 May 2005 (age 21)	4	0	(Poland) Raków Częstochowa	v. Germany, 31 March 2026
MF	Norbert Barczak	1 August 2005 (age 21)	3	1	(Poland) Korona Kielce	v. Germany, 31 March 2026
MF	Kacper Nowakowski	19 June 2006 (age 20)	3	0	(Poland) ŁKS Łódź	v. Germany, 31 March 2026
MF	Oliwier Olewiński	15 February 2006 (age 20)	3	0	(Poland) Miedź Legnica	v. Germany, 31 March 2026
MF	Kamil Cybulski	2 December 2006 (age 19)	2	0	(Poland) Stal Mielec	v. Germany, 31 March 2026
MF	Oskar Kubiak	25 September 2006 (age 20)	2	0	(Czech Republic) Slavia Prague	v. Germany, 31 March 2026
MF	Krzysztof Kolanko	3 August 2006 (age 20)	3	0	(Poland) Podbeskidzie Bielsko-Biała	v. Romania, 27 March 2026 ^{INJ}
MF	Wojciech Urbański	12 January 2005 (age 21)	5	1	(Poland) Legia Warsaw	v. Romania, 27 March 2026 ^{U21}
MF	Szymon Bartlewicz	14 November 2005 (age 21)	2	3	(Poland) GKS Katowice	v. Romania, 27 March 2026 ^{U21}
FW	Daniel Bąk	10 October 2005 (age 21)	5	0	(Poland) Korona Kielce	v. Germany, 31 March 2026
^{WD} Withdrew from the squad due to a non-injury issue.^{INJ} Withdrew from the squad due to an injury.^{PRE} Preliminary squad.^{U21} Withdrew from the squad due to a call up to the under-21 team.

== See also ==
- Poland national football team
- Poland Olympic football team
- Poland national under-21 football team
- Poland national under-19 football team
- Poland national under-18 football team
- Poland national under-17 football team
- Poland national under-16 football team
