= List of Kosovo international footballers born outside Kosovo =

The list of Kosovo international footballers born outside Kosovo includes all the players who were born outside Kosovo, including the Kosovan diaspora. This has happened officially since 6 February 2013, when the national team was given permission by FIFA to play against FIFA member associations in international friendlies. The first non-Albanian international football player, Adis Nurković was born in Velika Kladuša, SFR Yugoslavia (now Bosnia and Herzegovina) and he represented Kosovo during the 2017. The majority of these players were born in Switzerland.

List of countries where players were born*
| Country | Total |
|---|---|
| Switzerland | 26 |
| Germany | 21 |
| Sweden | 10 |
| Norway | 5 |
| Serbia and Montenegro (now Serbia) | 4 |
| Croatia | 3 |
| Finland | 3 |
| Austria | 1 |
| Belgium | 1 |
| England | 1 |
| Netherlands | 1 |
| Yugoslavia (now Bosnia and Herzegovina) | 1 |
* = Only eligible players are included.

The following players:

1. have been called up or have played at least one full international match with national senior team.
2. were born outside Kosovo.
3. This list includes players who have dual citizenship with Kosovo and/or have become naturalized Kosovan citizens.
4. This list includes only players who have played with Kosovo from the first official international match against Haiti, and until their last match against Sweden, on 8 September 2025.

The players are ordered per modern-day country of birth or if the country at the time of birth differs from the current, this is indicated with a subsection.

== Players ==
Below is the list of the 69 (65 eligible + 4 ineligible) players who were born outside Kosovo.

- Players in **bold** are called up to the squad in last 12 months and are still active at international level.
- Players with flags in front of their name are players who represented Kosovo, but now represent another national team.
- A yellow background indicates the most recent match.

=== Capped players ===
As of 8 September 2025

| Name | Place of birth | Origin | Pos. | Caps | Goals | First cap | | Last cap | | Ref |
| Name | Place of birth | Origin | Pos. | Caps | Goals | Opponent | Date | Opponent | Date | Ref |
|---|---|---|---|---|---|---|---|---|---|---|
| **Fidan Aliti** | (Switzerland) Binningen | Miratovac | DF | 61 | 1 | Turkey | 11 June 2017 | Sweden | 8 September 2025 | |
| **Valon Berisha** | (Sweden) Malmö | Podujevë | MF | 50 | 4 | Finland | 5 September 2016 | Switzerland | 5 September 2025 | |
| **Arijanet Muric** | (Switzerland) Schlieren | Rožaje | GK | 45 | 0 | Azerbaijan | 20 November 2018 | Sweden | 8 September 2025 | |
| **Edon Zhegrova** | (Germany) Herford | Dobrajë e Madhe | MF | 42 | 5 | Madagascar | 24 March 2018 | Lithuania | 18 November 2024 | |
| **Florent Hadergjonaj** | (Switzerland) Langnau | Deçan | DF | 38 | 1 | Bulgaria | 10 June 2019 | Comoros | 9 June 2025 | |
| **Leart Paqarada** | (Germany) Bremen | Podujevë | DF | 37 | 1 | Oman | 7 September 2014 | Switzerland | 5 September 2025 | |
| Besar Halimi | (Germany) Frankfurt | Malishevë, Gjilan | MF | 34 | 3 | Equatorial Guinea | 10 October 2015 | Greece | 14 November 2021 | |
| **Florent Muslija** | (Germany) Achern | Pristina | MF | 34 | 1 | Czech Republic | 7 September 2019 | Sweden | 8 September 2025 | |
| **Arbër Zeneli** | (Sweden) Säter | Mitrovica | MF | 33 | 9 | Croatia | 6 October 2016 | Andorra | 28 March 2023 | |
| Hekuran Kryeziu | (Switzerland) Luzern | Rogaçicë | MF | 30 | 0 | Albania | 13 November 2015 | Belarus | 19 June 2023 | |
| Elbasan Rashani | (Sweden) Värnamo | Vushtrri | FW | 29 | 5 | Albania | 13 November 2015 | Norway | 5 June 2024 | |
| Herolind Shala | (Norway) Porsgrunn | Drenas | MF | 27 | 0 | Croatia | 6 October 2016 | Greece | 14 November 2021 | |
| **Zymer Bytyqi** | (Belgium) Sint-Truiden | Lipjan | MF | 26 | 1 | Haiti | 5 March 2014 | Lithuania | 18 November 2024 | |
| Ibrahim Drešević | (Sweden) Fuxerna, Lilla Edet | Tuzi | DF | 25 | 0 | Gibraltar | 10 October 2019 | Romania | 12 September 2023 | |
| Benjamin Kololli | (Switzerland) Aigle | Lipjan | MF | 24 | 4 | Turkey | 12 November 2016 | Greece | 5 June 2022 | |
| Betim Fazliji | (Serbia and Montenegro) (Serbia) Vranje | Miratovac | DF | 22 | 0 | Albania | 11 November 2020 | Andorra | 12 October 2023 | |
| Idriz Voca | (Switzerland) Stans | Mitrovica | MF | 15 | 0 | Madagascar | 24 March 2018 | Malta | 4 June 2021 | |
| **Ilir Krasniqi** | (Germany) Bocholt | Kosovo Polje | MF | 14 | 0 | Cyprus | 27 September 2022 | Sweden | 8 September 2025 | |
| **Mirlind Kryeziu** | (Switzerland) Zürich | Malisheva | DF | 10 | 0 | Georgia | 2 September 2021 | Andorra | 28 March 2023 | |
| Blendi Idrizi | (Germany) Bonn | Gjilan | MF | 9 | 0 | San Marino | 1 June 2021 | Norway | 5 June 2024 | |
| Alban Pnishi | (Switzerland) Zürich | Gjakova | DF | 8 | 0 | Albania | 13 November 2015 | Iceland | 9 October 2017 | |
| **Fisnik Asllani** | (Germany) Berlin | Pristina | FW | 8 | 1 | Romania | 6 September 2024 | Sweden | 8 September 2025 | |
| **Emir Sahiti** | (Serbia and Montenegro) (Serbia) Zemun | Medveđa | MF | 7 | 1 | Northern Ireland | 9 June 2022 | Iceland | 23 March 2025 | |
| Donis Avdijaj | (Germany) Osnabrück | Istog | FW | 6 | 2 | Iceland | 24 March 2017 | Malta | 17 November 2018 | |
| **Astrit Selmani** | (Sweden) Malmö | Mitrovica | FW | 5 | 1 | Sweden | 9 October 2021 | Burkina Faso | 24 March 2022 | |
| Flamur Kastrati | (Norway) Oslo | Deçan | FW | 5 | 0 | Haiti | 5 March 2014 | Sweden | 12 January 2020 | |
| Avni Pepa | (Norway) Kristiansand | Peja | DF | 5 | 0 | Haiti | 5 March 2014 | Croatia | 6 October 2016 | |
| Toni Domgjoni | (Croatia) Koprivnica | Bishtazhin | MF | 4 | 1 | Burkina Faso | 24 March 2022 | Greece | 12 June 2022 | |
| **Kreshnik Hajrizi** | (Switzerland) Sierre | Prizren | DF | 4 | 0 | Faroe Islands | 19 November 2022 | Switzerland | 18 November 2023 | |
| Destan Bajselmani | (Netherlands) Enschede | Suva Reka | DF | 4 | 0 | San Marino | 1 June 2021 | Gambia | 11 June 2021 | |
| Eroll Zejnullahu | (Germany) Berlin | Podujevë | MF | 4 | 0 | Senegal | 25 May 2014 | Gambia | 11 June 2021 | |
| Valmir Sulejmani | (Germany) Großburgwedel | Gjilan | FW | 4 | 0 | Equatorial Guinea | 10 October 2015 | San Marino | 1 June 2021 | |
| **Altin Zeqiri** | (Finland) Espoo | Vushtrri | MF | 3 | 1 | Andorra | 12 October 2023 | Belarus | 21 November 2023 | |
| Imran Bunjaku | (Switzerland) Zürich | Gjilan | MF | 3 | 1 | Senegal | 25 May 2014 | Equatorial Guinea | 10 October 2015 | |
| **Vesel Demaku** | (Austria) Altenmarkt/Triesting | Drenas | MF | 3 | 0 | Iceland | 20 March 2025 | Armenia | 6 June 2025 | |
| **Amir Saipi** | (Switzerland) Schaffhausen | Prizren | GK | 3 | 0 | Lithuania | 12 October 2024 | Armenia | 6 June 2025 | |
| Lum Rexhepi | (Finland) Turku | Ferizaj | DF | 3 | 0 | Haiti | 5 March 2014 | Faroe Islands | 3 June 2016 | |
| **Leon Avdullahu** | (Switzerland) Solothurn | Kamenica | MF | 2 | 0 | Switzerland | 5 September 2025 | Sweden | 8 September 2025 | |
| **Florian Haxha** | (Germany) Berlin | Mitrovica | MF | 2 | 0 | Armenia | 6 June 2025 | Comoros | 9 June 2025 | |
| **Ismet Lushaku** | (Sweden) Eskilstuna | Pristina | MF | 2 | 0 | Sweden | 12 January 2020 | Comoros | 9 June 2025 | |
| Arianit Ferati | (Germany) Stuttgart | Mitrovica | MF | 2 | 0 | Armenia | 16 November 2022 | Faroe Islands | 19 November 2022 | |
| Lavdrim Hajrulahu | (Switzerland) Lausanne | Miratovac | DF | 2 | 0 | Guinea | 8 June 2021 | Gambia | 11 June 2021 | |
| Liridon Balaj | (Switzerland) La Chaux-de-Fonds | Peja | MF | 2 | 0 | Guinea | 8 June 2021 | Gambia | 11 June 2021 | |
| Mersim Asllani | (Switzerland) Aigle | Gjakova | MF | 2 | 0 | Guinea | 8 June 2021 | Gambia | 11 June 2021 | |
| Gjelbrim Taipi | (Serbia and Montenegro) (Serbia) Bujanovac | Veliki Trnovac | MF | 2 | 0 | Burkina Faso | 27 March 2018 | Albania | 29 May 2018 | |
| Alban Bunjaku | (England) Romford | | MF | 2 | 0 | Turkey | 21 May 2014 | Senegal | 25 May 2014 | |
| **Veldin Hodža** | (Croatia) Rijeka | Restelicë | MF | 1 | 0 | Sweden, 8 September 2025 | | | | |
| **Bledian Krasniqi** | (Switzerland) Zurich | Gjilan | MF | 1 | 0 | Comoros, 9 June 2025 | | | | |
| **Andi Hoti** | (Switzerland) Uster | Ratkoc | DF | 1 | 0 | Lithuania, 18 November 2024 | | | | |
| **Eliot Bujupi** | (Germany) Böblingen | Arllat | FW | 1 | 0 | Cyprus, 9 September 2024 | | | | |
| **Art Smakaj** | (Croatia) Zagreb | Drenas | MF | 1 | 0 | Norway, 5 June 2024 | | | | |
| Alban Ajdini | (Switzerland) Geneva | Veliki Trnovac | MF | 1 | 0 | Belarus, 21 November 2023 | | | | |
| **Ismajl Beka** | (Switzerland) Frauenfeld | | DF | 1 | 0 | Romania, 12 September 2023 | | | | |
| Jozef Pukaj | (Switzerland) Riehen | Istog | GK | 1 | 0 | Faroe Islands, 19 November 2022 | | | | |
| Jetmir Haliti | (Sweden) Malmö | Mitrovica | DF | 1 | 0 | Armenia, 16 November 2022 | | | | |
| Eris Abedini | (Switzerland) Sorengo | Komogllavë | MF | 1 | 0 | Armenia, 16 November 2022 | | | | |
| Lorik Emini | (Switzerland) Zug | Gjilan | MF | 1 | 0 | San Marino, 1 June 2021 | | | | |
| Leotrim Bekteshi | (Germany) Berlin | Mitrovica | DF | 1 | 0 | Sweden, 12 January 2020 | | | | |
| Ylldren Ibrahimaj | (Norway) Arendal | | MF | 1 | 0 | Sweden, 12 January 2020 | | | | |
| Arbenit Xhemajli | (Switzerland) Brugg | Ferizaj | DF | 1 | 0 | Gibraltar, 10 October 2019 | | | | |
| Shkelqim Demhasaj | (Switzerland) Schaffhausen | Carrabreg i Poshtëm | FW | 1 | 0 | Malta, 17 November 2018 | | | | |
| Jetmir Krasniqi | (Switzerland) Nyon | Klina | DF | 1 | 0 | Albania, 29 May 2018 | | | | |
| Bledar Hajdini | (Germany) Fürstenfeldbruck | Podujevë | GK | 1 | 0 | Latvia, 13 November 2017 | | | | |
| Suad Sahiti | (Serbia and Montenegro) (Serbia) Belgrade | Medveđa | MF | 1 | 0 | Latvia, 13 November 2017 | | | | |
| Adis Nurković | (Socialist Federal Republic of Yugoslavia) (Bosnia and Herzegovina) Velika Kladuša | Prizren (by marriage) | GK | 1 | 0 | Turkey, 11 June 2017 | | | | |

=== Ineligible players ===
| Name | Place of birth | Origin | Pos. | Caps | Goals | First cap or call-up | | Last cap or call-up | | Ref |
| Name | Place of birth | Origin | Pos. | Caps | Goals | Opponent | Date | Opponent | Date | Ref |
|---|---|---|---|---|---|---|---|---|---|---|
| (Switzerland) Uran Bislimi | (Switzerland) Basel | Shtime | MF | 2 | 1 | Armenia | 16 November 2022 | Faroe Islands | 19 November 2022 | |
| (Finland) Agon Sadiku | (Finland) Raahe | Ferizaj | FW | 2 | 0 | Armenia | 16 November 2022 | Faroe Islands | 19 November 2022 | |
| (Germany) Enis Bunjaki | (Germany) Offenbach am Main | Gjilan | FW | 2 | 0 | Senegal | 25 May 2014 | Oman | 7 September 2014 | |
| (Albania) Albion Avdijaj | (Switzerland) Zürich | Gjakova | FW | 2 | 0 | Turkey | 21 May 2014 | Senegal | 25 May 2014 | |
