= Football at the 2026 Mediterranean Games – Men's tournament =

2026 Men's Mediterranean Games Football Tournament
Tournament details
- Host country: Italy
- City: Taranto
- Dates: 22 August – 30 August
- Teams: 8 (from 2 confederations)
- Venues: 4 (in 4 host cities)

Final positions
- Champions: Algeria (2nd title)
- Runners-up: Tunisia
- Third place: Morocco
- Fourth place: Italy

Tournament statistics
- Matches played: 16
- Goals scored: 48 (3 per match)
- Top scorer: (Algeria) Ben Ahmed Kohili (5 goals)

Men's football tournament at the 2026 Mediterranean Games will be held at the Stadio Erasmo Iacovone, the Stadio Ettore Giardiniero, the Stadio Giovanni Paolo II and the Stadio Franco Fanuzzi from 22 to 30 August 2026.

== Participating nations ==
| Confederation | Nation |
|---|---|
| CAF (Africa) | Algeria U21 Morocco U20 Tunisia U21 |
| UEFA (Europe) | Albania U21 Italy U18 Kosovo U21 North Macedonia U20 Turkey U20 |

== Venues ==
| Stadium | City | Capacity |
|---|---|---|
| Stadio Erasmo Iacovone | Taranto | 20,369 |
| Stadio Ettore Giardiniero | Lecce | 31,461 |
| Stadio Giovanni Paolo II | Francavilla Fontana | 3,500 |
| Stadio Franco Fanuzzi | Brindisi | 7,500 |

== Schedule ==
| P | Group stage | ½ | Semifinals | B | Bronze medal match | F | Gold medal match |

| 22 Sat | 23 Sun | 24 Mon | 25 Tue | 26 Wed | 27 Thu | 28 Fri | 29 Sat | 30 Sun | |
|---|---|---|---|---|---|---|---|---|---|
| G | | G | | G | | ½ | | B | F |

== Group stage ==
All times are local (UTC+2).

=== Group A ===
| Pos | Team | Pld | W | D | L | GF | GA | GD | Pts | Qualification |
|---|---|---|---|---|---|---|---|---|---|---|
| 1 | Tunisia | 3 | 2 | 1 | 0 | 3 | 1 | +2 | 7 | Semifinals |
| 2 | Morocco | 3 | 1 | 1 | 1 | 7 | 4 | +3 | 4 | Semifinals |
| 3 | Turkey | 3 | 1 | 1 | 1 | 6 | 4 | +2 | 4 | |
| 4 | North Macedonia | 3 | 0 | 1 | 2 | 1 | 8 | −7 | 1 | |

Source: Taranto 2026
22 August 2026
21:00

| Morocco | 2–2 | Turkey |
|---|---|---|
| Iguiz 1'; Arkide 48' | Report | Aslan 74'; Turhan 90+4' |

Stadio Franco Fanuzzi, Brindisi
Referee: Andi Koci (Albania)
22 August 2026
21:00

| Tunisia | 0–0 | North Macedonia |
|---|---|---|
| | Report |

Stadio Giovanni Paolo II, Francavilla Fontana
Referee: Hicham Temsamani (Morocco)

24 August 2026
10:30

| Morocco | 0–1 | Tunisia |
|---|---|---|
| | Report | Rhimi 49' |

Stadio Giovanni Paolo II, Francavilla Fontana
Referee: Alessandro Pio Carpentiere (Italy)
24 August 2026
21:00

| Turkey | 3–0 | North Macedonia |
|---|---|---|
| Özcan 26' (pen.), 41', 59' | Report |

Stadio Giovanni Paolo II, Francavilla Fontana
Referee: Bassem Belaid (Tunisia)

26 August 2026
10:30

| North Macedonia | 1–5 | Morocco |
|---|---|---|
| Tasev 4' | Report | Raji 1'; Zinebi 36'; Mounssef 58'; Essaadi 78'; Gourari 84' |

Stadio Franco Fanuzzi, Brindisi
Referee: Matteo Marchetti (Italy)
26 August 2026
10:30

| Turkey | 1–2 | Tunisia |
|---|---|---|
| Özcan 64' | Report | Anene 35'; İnce 55' (o.g.) |

Stadio Giovanni Paolo II, Francavilla Fontana
Referee: Kreshnik Cjapi (Albania)

=== Group B ===
| Pos | Team | Pld | W | D | L | GF | GA | GD | Pts | Qualification |
|---|---|---|---|---|---|---|---|---|---|---|
| 1 | Algeria | 3 | 3 | 0 | 0 | 7 | 2 | +5 | 9 | Semifinals |
| 2 | Italy (H) | 3 | 1 | 1 | 1 | 5 | 4 | +1 | 4 | Semifinals |
| 3 | Albania | 3 | 1 | 1 | 1 | 4 | 4 | 0 | 4 | |
| 4 | Kosovo | 3 | 0 | 0 | 3 | 2 | 8 | −6 | 0 | |

Source: Taranto 2026
(H) Hosts
22 August 2026
10:30

| Algeria | 2–1 | Kosovo |
|---|---|---|
| Kohili 33'; Tarzout 90+1' | Report | Grezda 76' |

Stadio Giovanni Paolo II, Francavilla Fontana
Referee: Bassem Belaid (Tunisia)
22 August 2026
21:00

| Italy | 1–1 | Albania |
|---|---|---|
| Casagrande 56' | Report | Marinaj 45+4' |

Stadio Ettore Giardiniero, Lecce
Referee: Ozan Ergün (Turkey)

24 August 2026
21:00

| Italy | 1–3 | Algeria |
|---|---|---|
| Naim 65' (o.g.) | Report | Akhrib 18'; Kohili 79'; Bouderbala 88' |

Stadio Franco Fanuzzi, Brindisi
Referee: Angelcho Ristov (North Macedonia)
24 August 2026
21:00

| Albania | 3–1 | Kosovo |
|---|---|---|
| Bode 50'; Daja 73'; Leshi 90' | Report | Hajdini 90+3' |

Stadio Ettore Giardiniero, Lecce
Referee: Matteo Marchetti (Italy)

26 August 2026
10:30

| Algeria | 2–0 | Albania |
|---|---|---|
| Akhrib 58'; Abdelaziz 73' | Report |

Stadio Giovanni Paolo II, Francavilla Fontana
Referee: Hicham Temsamani (Morocco)
26 August 2026
21:00

| Kosovo | 0–3 | Italy |
|---|---|---|
| | Report | Giammattei 30'; Casagrande 75' (pen.); Perillo 90+8' |

Stadio Erasmo Iacovone, Taranto
Attendance: 16,500
Referee: Ozan Ergün (Turkey)

== Knockout stage ==
Semifinals
28 August – Taranto
Tunisia | 3
Italy | 1
28 August – Taranto
Algeria | 1 (4)
Morocco | 1 (3)

Final
30 August – Taranto
Tunisia | 0
Algeria | 2
Third place
30 August – Taranto
Italy | 1
Morocco | 4

=== Semifinals ===
28 August 2026
10:30

| Tunisia | 3–1 | Italy |
|---|---|---|
| Derbali 69'; Anene 74'; Dhouib 90+2' | Report | Perillo 21' |

Stadio Erasmo Iacovone, Taranto
Referee: Andi Koci (Albania)
28 August 2026
21:00

| Algeria | 1–1 | Morocco |
|---|---|---|
| Kohili 25' | Report | Kasbi 52' |
Penalties
| Kohili (penalty missed); Anatouf (penalty scored); Bouderbala (penalty scored); Bouziani (penalty scored); Belgourai (penalty scored) | 4–3 | (penalty scored) Raji; (penalty scored) Mounssef; (penalty scored) Benomar; (penalty missed) Gourari; (penalty missed) Bouhaddi |

Stadio Erasmo Iacovone, Taranto
Referee: Kreshnik Cjapi (Albania)

=== Bronze medal game ===
30 August 2026
10:00

| Italy | 1–4 | Morocco |
|---|---|---|
| Giammattei 59' | Report | Mounssef 9'; Eddaoudi 47'; Essaadi 50'; Benomar 75' |

Stadio Erasmo Iacovone, Taranto
Referee: Angelcho Ristov (North Macedonia)

=== Gold medal game ===
30 August 2026
21:00

| Tunisia | 0–2 | Algeria |
|---|---|---|
| | Report | Kohili 1', 82' (pen.) |

Stadio Erasmo Iacovone, Taranto
Attendance: 7.000
Referee: Ozan Ergün (Turkey)

== Final standings ==
| Pos | Team | Pld | W | D | L | GF | GA | GD | Pts | Final result |
|---|---|---|---|---|---|---|---|---|---|---|
| 1st place, gold medalist(s) | Algeria | 5 | 4 | 1 | 0 | 10 | 3 | +7 | 13 | Gold medal |
| 2nd place, silver medalist(s) | Tunisia | 5 | 3 | 1 | 1 | 6 | 4 | +2 | 10 | Silver medal |
| 3rd place, bronze medalist(s) | Morocco | 5 | 2 | 2 | 1 | 12 | 6 | +6 | 8 | Bronze medal |
| 4 | Italy (H) | 5 | 1 | 1 | 3 | 7 | 11 | −4 | 4 | Fourth place |
| 5 | Turkey | 3 | 1 | 1 | 1 | 6 | 4 | +2 | 4 | Group stage |
| 6 | Albania | 3 | 1 | 1 | 1 | 4 | 4 | 0 | 4 | Group stage |
| 7 | North Macedonia | 3 | 0 | 1 | 2 | 1 | 8 | −7 | 1 | Group stage |
| 8 | Kosovo | 3 | 0 | 0 | 3 | 2 | 8 | −6 | 0 | Group stage |

Source: Taranto2026
(H) Hosts

== Goalscorers ==
There were 53 goals scored in 16 matches, for an average of 3.31 goals per match.

5 goals

- (Algeria) Ben Ahmed Kohili

4 goals

- (Turkey) Özder Özcan

2 goals

- (Algeria) Lahlou Akhrib
- (Italy) Tommaso Casagrande
- (Italy) Gioele Giammattei
- (Italy) Diego Perillo
- (Morocco) Karim Essaadi
- (Morocco) Mohamed Mounssef
- (Tunisia) Mohamed Rayen Anene

1 goal

- (Algeria) Houssam Alla Eddine Abdelaziz
- (Algeria) Mohamed Bouderbala
- (Algeria) Houssem Tarzout
- (Albania) Ersi Bode
- (Albania) Valentin Daja
- (Albania) Arlind Leshi
- (Albania) Rajmond Marinaj
- (Kosovo) Oniks Grezda
- (Kosovo) Lorik Mehmeti
- (North Macedonia) Darijan Tasev
- (Morocco) Abderrahman Arkid
- (Morocco) Anass Benomar
- (Morocco) Abdelali Eddaoudi
- (Morocco) Abdelghafour Gourari
- (Morocco) Yahya Iguiz
- (Morocco) Khalid Kasbi
- (Morocco) Hamza Raji
- (Morocco) Rayan Zinebi Talbi
- (Tunisia) Alaeddine Derbali
- (Tunisia) Walid Dhouib
- (Tunisia) Mohamed Rayen Rhimi
- (Turkey) Berkay Aslan
- (Turkey) Tuğra Turhan
