= Andi Hoti =

Kosovan footballer (born 2003)

Personal information
- Date of birth: 2 March 2003 (age 23)
- Place of birth: Uster, Switzerland
- Height: 1.91 m (6 ft 3 in)
- Position: Centre-back

Team information
- Current team: Eintracht Braunschweig
- Number: 4

Youth career
- –2020: Zürich
- 2020–2022: Inter Milan

Senior career*
Years	Team	Apps	(Gls)
2022–2023	Inter Milan	0	(0)
2022–2023	→ SC Freiburg II (loan)	23	(1)
2023–2026	1. FC Magdeburg	29	(0)
2025	→ Dynamo Dresden (loan)	10	(1)
2025–2026	1. FC Magdeburg II	2	(0)
2026–	Eintracht Braunschweig	11	(0)

International career^{‡}
2019	Albania U17	1	(0)
2019	Kosovo U17	2	(0)
2021–2024	Kosovo U21	15	(1)
2024–	Kosovo	1	(0)
- * Club domestic league appearances and goals as of 18 May 2026 ‡ National team caps and goals as of 18 November 2024

Andi Hoti (born 2 March 2003) is a professional footballer who plays as a centre-back for German 2. Bundesliga club Eintracht Braunschweig. Born in Switzerland, he plays for the Kosovo national team.

== Club career ==
In January 2020, Hoti joined the youth team of Serie A club Inter Milan. Inter Milan reportedly paid a €150,000 transfer fee. On 19 July 2021, he signed his first professional contract with Inter Milan after agreeing to a three-year deal.

On 18 July 2022, Hoti joined 3. Liga side SC Freiburg II, on a season-long loan. On 6 August 2022, he made his debut in a 1–0 away win against SpVgg Bayreuth after being named in the starting line-up.

In June 2023, Hoti signed for 2. Bundesliga club 1. FC Magdeburg on a permanent basis. On 3 January 2025, Hoti moved on loan to Dynamo Dresden, reuniting with his former SC Freiburg II coach Thomas Stamm.

On 2 February 2026, Hoti joined Eintracht Braunschweig on a two-and-a-half-year contract.

== International career ==
=== Youth ===
On 27 June 2018, Hoti received a call-up from Kosovo U15 for a training camp in Lindabrunn. On 8 October 2019, he was named as part of the Kosovo U17 squad for 2020 UEFA European Under-17 Championship qualifications. His debut with Kosovo U17 came a day later in a 2020 UEFA European Under-17 Championship qualification match against Netherlands U17 after being named in the starting line-up.

On 22 May 2021, Hoti received a call-up from Kosovo U21 for a 2023 UEFA European Under-21 Championship qualification match against the Andorra U21, he was an unused substitute in that match. His debut with Kosovo U21 came on 7 September 2021 in a 2023 UEFA European Under-21 Championship qualification match against England U21 after being named in the starting line-up.

=== Senior ===
On 31 August 2023, Hoti received his first call-up to the Kosovo senior national team by head coach Primož Gliha, for two UEFA Euro 2024 qualifying matches against Switzerland and Romania. His debut with Kosovo came on 18 November 2024 in a 2024–25 UEFA Nations League match against Lithuania after coming on as a substitute at 79th minute in place of Edon Zhegrova.

== Personal life ==
Hoti was born in Uster, Switzerland to Kosovo Albanian parents from the Ratkoc village of Rahovec.
