= Football at the 2026 Mediterranean Games =

Tournament details
- Host country: Italy
- City: Taranto
- Dates: 22 August – 31 August
- Teams: 8 (men); 5 (women)
- Venues: 4 (in 4 host cities)

The football at the 2026 Mediterranean Games in Taranto took place from 22 to 31 August. In this edition for the first time a women's tournament was held.

Taranto 2026 marked the last appearance of football at the Mediterranean Games, as the International Committee of Mediterranean Games decided in 2025 - following a proposal by the Libyan Olympic Committee - to replace football with futsal starting with the 2030 Mediterranean Games in Pristina, in order to reduce organizational costs.

== Participating nations ==
Men

Confederation	Nation
CAF (Africa)	Algeria U21 Morocco U20 Tunisia U21
UEFA (Europe)	Albania U21 Italy U18 Kosovo U21 North Macedonia U20 Turkey U20

Women

Confederation	Nation
CAF (Africa)	Morocco U18
UEFA (Europe)	Italy U18 Kosovo U18 Portugal U18 Slovenia U18

== Schedule ==
P	Group stage	½	Semifinals	B	Bronze medal match	F	Gold medal match

Event↓/Date →	22 Sat	23 Sun	24 Mon	25 Tue	26 Wed	27 Thu	28 Fri	29 Sat	30 Sun		31 Mon	
Men	G		G		G		½		B	F		
Women	G	G		G		G		G			B	F

== Venues ==
4 stadiums were allocated to host the matches

Football at the 2026 Mediterranean Games is located in Apulia	Taranto	Lecce
Football at the 2026 Mediterranean Games is located in Apulia	Stadio Erasmo Iacovone	Stadio Ettore Giardiniero
Football at the 2026 Mediterranean Games is located in Apulia	Capacity: 20,369	Capacity: 31,461
Football at the 2026 Mediterranean Games is located in Apulia	Francavilla Fontana	Brindisi
Football at the 2026 Mediterranean Games is located in Apulia	Stadio Giovanni Paolo II	Stadio Franco Fanuzzi
Football at the 2026 Mediterranean Games is located in Apulia	Capacity: 3,500	Capacity: 7,500

== Medal summary ==
=== Events ===
Event	Gold	Silver	Bronze
Men	Algeria U21	Tunisia U21	Morocco U20
Women	Portugal U18	Italy U18	Morocco U18

=== Medal table ===
* Host nation (Italy)

Rank	Nation	Gold	Silver	Bronze	Total
1	Algeria	1	0	0	1
1	Portugal	1	0	0	1
3	Italy*	0	1	0	1
3	Tunisia	0	1	0	1
5	Morocco	0	0	2	2
Totals (5 entries)		2	2	2	6
