= Football at the 2026 Mediterranean Games – Women's tournament =

2026 Women's Mediterranean Games Football Tournament
Tournament details
- Host country: Italy
- City: Taranto
- Dates: 22 August - 31 August
- Teams: 5 (from 2 confederations)
- Venues: 4 (in 4 host cities)

Women's football tournament at the 2026 Mediterranean Games will be held at the Stadio Erasmo Iacovone, the Stadio Ettore Giardiniero, the Stadio Giovanni Paolo II and the Stadio Franco Fanuzzi from 22 to 31 August 2026. It will be the first women's football tournament in the history of the Mediterranean Games, featuring five U-18 national teams.

Initially, the national teams of Algeria and Spain were also due to take part. A few days before the start of the tournament, the Royal Spanish Football Federation (RFEF) withdrew its team because, due to a misinterpretation of the tournament regulations, it had also called up four players born before 2009, who were therefore ineligible under the tournament organisers’ rules. The same problem also affected the Algerian national team, which was thus unable to replace its strongest players who were ineligible for the competition. The tournament regulations did in fact contain a typographical error, as it allowed players under the age of 18 born ‘before’ 31 December 2008 (rather than born ‘after’ 31 December 2008) to take part. With two teams withdrawing, the organising committee was forced to reschedule the matches for the remaining five teams, placing them in a single group with direct entry to the finals (instead of the original two groups leading to the semi-finals), thereby making an exception to the tournament rules which stipulated a minimum of six teams.

== Participating nations ==
Confederation	Nation
CAF (Africa)	Morocco U17
UEFA (Europe)	Italia U18; Kosovo U18; Portugal U18; Slovenia U18

== Venues ==
Stadium	City	Capacity
Stadio Erasmo Iacovone	Taranto	20,369
Stadio Ettore Giardiniero	Lecce	31,461
Stadio Giovanni Paolo II	Francavilla Fontana	3,500
Stadio Franco Fanuzzi	Brindisi	7,500

== Schedule ==
P	Group stage	½	Semifinals	B	Bronze medal match	F	Gold medal match

22 Sat	23 Sun	24 Mon	25 Tue	26 Wed	27 Thu	28 Fri	29 Sat	30 Sun	31 Mon	
G	G		G		G		G		B	F

== Results ==
=== Knockout stages ===
All times are local (UTC+2).

Pos	Team	Pld	W	D	L	GF	GA	GD	Pts	Qualification
1	Portugal	4	2	2	0	10	3	+7	8	Final
2	Italy (H)	4	2	2	0	9	4	+5	8	Final
3	Morocco	4	2	1	1	11	5	+6	7	Third place match
4	Slovenia	4	0	2	2	2	10	−8	2	Third place match
5	Kosovo	4	0	1	3	2	12	−10	1	

Source: Taranto 2026
(H) Hosts
22 August 2026
10:30

Slovenia	0–4	Morocco
	Report	Dissi 51'; Mouradi 60' (pen.), 67'; Boughazi 64'

Stadio Franco Fanuzzi, Brindisi
Referee: Maria Marotta (Italy)
22 August 2026
10:30

Portugal	3–0	Kosovo
Gonçalves Matos 6'; Beha 69' (o.g.); Halili 80+3' (o.g.)	Report

Stadio Ettore Giardiniero, Lecce
Referee: Tjasa Misja (Slovenia)

23 August 2026
21:00

Portugal	2–2	Morocco
Gonçalves 36'; de Matos 52'	Report	Oubella 17'; Boughazi 21'

Stadio Franco Fanuzzi, Brindisi
Referee: Vito Filippi (Italy)
23 August 2026
21:00

Italy	4–1	Kosovo
Rosso 12'; Guerzoni 26' (pen.), 35' (pen.); Andreangeli 42'	Report	Pezzi 46' (o.g.)

Stadio Giovanni Paolo II, Francavilla Fontana
Referee: Kreshnik Cjapi (Albania)

25 August 2026
21:00

Morocco	4–0	Kosovo
Mouradi 7', 14' (pen.); Abajiou 39', 45'	Report

Stadio Franco Fanuzzi, Brindisi
Referee: Danilo Ragno (Italy)
25 August 2026
21:00

Italy	1–1	Slovenia
Martone 21'	Report	Velišček 12'

Stadio Giovanni Paolo II, Francavilla Fontana
Referee: Andi Koci (Albania)

27 August 2026
21:00

Portugal	4–0	Slovenia
Gonçalves Matos 25'; Silva 42'; Pereira Branco 74'; Neves 76'	Report

Stadio Franco Fanuzzi, Brindisi
Referee: Alessandro Pio Carpentiere (Italy)
27 August 2026
21:00

Italy	3–1	Morocco
Pinchi 38'; Guerzoni 51'; Rosso 71'	Report	El Hajouti 14'

Stadio Erasmo Iacovone, Taranto
Referee: Bassem Belaid (Tunisia)

29 August 2026
18:00

Slovenia	1–1	Kosovo
Kavas 26'	Report	Sinani 6'

Stadio Franco Fanuzzi, Brindisi
Referee: Matteo Marchetti (Italy)
29 August 2026
18:00

Portugal	1–1	Italy
Ferreira Mendes Morgad 50'	Report	Ciurleo 79'

Stadio Erasmo Iacovone, Taranto
Referee: Andi Koci (Albania)

=== Bronze medal game ===
31 August 2026
10:30

Morocco	3–1	Slovenia
Mouradi 14'; Hamdani 69'; Boushaba 79'	Report	Gjergjek 80+1'

Stadio Franco Fanuzzi, Brindisi
Referee: Bassem Belaid (Tunisia)

=== Gold medal game ===
31 August 2026
21:00

Portugal	4–0	Italy
Barbosa 6', 26'; Gonçalves 15'; De Matos 64'	Report

Stadio Erasmo Iacovone, Taranto
Referee: Tjasa Misja (Slovenia)

== Final standings ==
Pos	Team	Pld	W	D	L	GF	GA	GD	Pts	Final result
1st place, gold medalist(s)	Portugal	5	3	2	0	14	3	+11	11	Gold medal
2nd place, silver medalist(s)	Italy (H)	5	2	2	1	9	8	+1	8	Silver medal
3rd place, bronze medalist(s)	Morocco	5	3	1	1	14	6	+8	10	Bronze medal
4	Slovenia	5	0	2	3	3	13	−10	2	Fourth place
5	Kosovo	4	0	1	3	2	12	−10	1	Group stage

Source: Taranto2026
(H) Hosts
