= 2023 UEFA European Under-21 Championship qualification Group G =

Football tournament qualification stage

Group G of the 2023 UEFA European Under-21 Championship qualifying competition consisted of six teams: England, Czech Republic, Slovenia, Albania, Kosovo, and Andorra. The composition of the nine groups in the qualifying group stage was decided by the draw held on 28 January 2021, 12:00 CET (UTC+1), at the UEFA headquarters in Nyon, Switzerland, with the teams seeded according to their coefficient ranking.

== Standings ==
| Pos | Team | Pld | W | D | L | GF | GA | GD | Pts | Qualification | England | Czech Republic | Slovenia | Kosovo | Albania | Andorra |
|---|---|---|---|---|---|---|---|---|---|---|---|---|---|---|---|---|
| 1 | England | 10 | 8 | 1 | 1 | 26 | 7 | +19 | 25 | Final tournament | — | 3–1 | 1–2 | 2–0 | 3–0 | 4–1 |
| 2 | Czech Republic | 10 | 7 | 1 | 2 | 23 | 6 | +17 | 22 | Play-offs | 1–2 | — | 1–0 | 3–0 | 4–0 | 7–0 |
| 3 | Slovenia | 10 | 4 | 4 | 2 | 11 | 7 | +4 | 16 | | 2–2 | 1–1 | — | 0–0 | 3–0 | 2–0 |
| 4 | Kosovo | 10 | 3 | 3 | 4 | 8 | 13 | −5 | 12 | | 0–5 | 0–1 | 0–0 | — | 2–1 | 2–0 |
| 5 | Albania | 10 | 3 | 1 | 6 | 9 | 17 | −8 | 10 | | 0–3 | 0–1 | 2–0 | 1–1 | — | 2–0 |
| 6 | Andorra | 10 | 0 | 0 | 10 | 1 | 28 | −27 | 0 | | 0–1 | 0–3 | 0–1 | 0–3 | 0–3 | — |

Source: UEFA
Rules for classification: Tiebreakers

== Matches ==
Times are CET/CEST, (Note: CEST (UTC+2) for dates between 31 March and 26 October 2021 and between 29 March and 24 October 2022, and CET (UTC+1) for all other dates.) as listed by UEFA (local times, if different, are in parentheses).

4 June 2021
18:00

| Andorra | 0–3 | Albania |
|---|---|---|
| | Report | Broja 17'; Mehmeti 43' (pen.); Álvarez 62' (o.g.) |

Estadi Nacional, Andorra la Vella
Attendance: 185
Referee: Amin Kurgheli (Belarus)

8 June 2021
20:00

| Kosovo | 2–0 | Andorra |
|---|---|---|
| Dio. Berisha 82'; Marleku 85' | Report |

Fadil Vokrri Stadium, Pristina
Attendance: 0
Referee: Nikolas Neokleous (Cyprus)

2 September 2021
18:00

| Czech Republic | 1–0 | Slovenia |
|---|---|---|
| Vitík 89' | Report |

Stadion Střelecký ostrov, České Budějovice
Attendance: 1,552
Referee: Don Robertson (Scotland)

6 September 2021
18:00

| Czech Republic | 4–0 | Albania |
|---|---|---|
| Ostrák 7'; Fila 13'; Danek 32'; Šulc 83' | Report |

Stadion Střelecký ostrov, České Budějovice
Attendance: 1,784
Referee: Julian Weinberger (Austria)
6 September 2021
19:00

| Andorra | 0–1 | Slovenia |
|---|---|---|
| | Report | Stojinović 61' |

Estadi Nacional, Andorra la Vella
Attendance: 324
Referee: Petri Viljanen (Finland)

7 September 2021
20:00 (19:00 BST)

| England | 2–0 | Kosovo |
|---|---|---|
| Brewster 10' (pen.); Palmer 26' | Report |

Stadium MK, Milton Keynes
Attendance: 5,781
Referee: Kaarlo Oskari Hämäläinen (Finland)

7 October 2021
19:00

| Kosovo | 0–1 | Czech Republic |
|---|---|---|
| | Report | Gabriel 38' |

Fadil Vokrri Stadium, Pristina
Attendance: 300
Referee: Rauf Jabarov (Azerbaijan)
7 October 2021
20:15

| Slovenia | 2–2 | England |
|---|---|---|
| Španring 49'; Stojinović 66' | Report | Gallagher 5'; Palmer 14' |

Stadion Z'dežele, Celje
Attendance: 457
Referee: Aristotelis Diamantopoulos (Greece)
7 October 2021
19:00

| Albania | 2–0 | Andorra |
|---|---|---|
| Muçi 36', 90+2' | Report |

Elbasan Arena, Elbasan
Attendance: 100
Referee: Alex Troleis (Faroe Islands)

11 October 2021
18:30

| Albania | 2–0 | Slovenia |
|---|---|---|
| Karrica 53'; Dobra 58' | Report |

Elbasan Arena, Elbasan
Attendance: 200
Referee: Bram Van Driessche (Belgium)
11 October 2021
20:00

| Andorra | 0–1 | England |
|---|---|---|
| | Report | Smith Rowe 67' |

Estadi Nacional, Andorra la Vella
Attendance: 572
Referee: Igor Stojchevski (North Macedonia)

12 October 2021
18:00

| Czech Republic | 3–0 | Kosovo |
|---|---|---|
| Sejk 10'; Gabriel 38'; Šulc 57' | Report |

Stadion Střelecký ostrov, České Budějovice
Attendance: 2,439
Referee: Gal Leibovitz (Israel)

11 November 2021
20:00 (19:00 GMT)

| England | 3–1 | Czech Republic |
|---|---|---|
| Gordon 4', 11'; Balogun 30' | Report | Karabec 40' (pen.) |

Turf Moor, Burnley
Attendance: 6,507
Referee: Michael Fabbri (Italy)

12 November 2021
18:00

| Slovenia | 3–0 | Albania |
|---|---|---|
| Flakus Bosilj 7', 75'; Matko 24' | Report |

Bonifika Stadium, Koper
Attendance: 320
Referee: Rob Hennessy (Republic of Ireland)

16 November 2021
18:00

| Slovenia | 1–1 | Czech Republic |
|---|---|---|
| Zec 32' | Report | Čvančara 59' |

Bonifika Stadium, Koper
Attendance: 320
Referee: Bojan Pandžić (Sweden)
16 November 2021
19:00

| Kosovo | 2–1 | Albania |
|---|---|---|
| E. Krasniqi 66'; Sejdiu 90+2' | Report | Karrica 58' |

Fadil Vokrri Stadium, Pristina
Attendance: 600
Referee: Trustin Farrugia Cann (Malta)

25 March 2022
18:00

| Kosovo | 0–0 | Slovenia |
|---|---|---|
| | Report |

Fadil Vokrri Stadium, Pristina
Attendance: 600
Referee: Ian McNabb (Northern Ireland)
25 March 2022
19:00

| Albania | 0–1 | Czech Republic |
|---|---|---|
| | Report | Kalaj 35' (o.g.) |

Elbasan Arena, Elbasan
Attendance: 700
Referee: Antonio Emanuel Carvalho Nobre (Portugal)
25 March 2022
20:45 (19:45 GMT)

| England | 4–1 | Andorra |
|---|---|---|
| Balogun 6'; Ramsey 34'; Gibbs-White 54'; Gordon 80' | Report | Rosas 63' |

Dean Court, Bournemouth
Attendance: 8,852
Referee: Jasmin Sabotic (Luxembourg)

29 March 2022
16:00

| Slovenia | 0–0 | Kosovo |
|---|---|---|
| | Report |

Ljudski vrt, Maribor
Attendance: 437
Referee: Ioannis Papadopoulos (Greece)
29 March 2022
18:00

| Andorra | 0–3 | Czech Republic |
|---|---|---|
| | Report | Karabec 6'; Fila 10', 56' |

Estadi Nacional, Andorra la Vella
Attendance: 250
Referee: Matthew De Gabriele (Malta)
29 March 2022
20:45

| Albania | 0–3 | England |
|---|---|---|
| | Report | Balogun 47', 62'; Jones 51' |

Elbasan Arena, Elbasan
Attendance: 700
Referee: Kaspar Sjöberg (Sweden)

3 June 2022
18:00

| Czech Republic | 1–2 | England |
|---|---|---|
| Fila 88' | Report | Smith Rowe 22'; Ramsey 46' |

Stadion Střelecký ostrov, České Budějovice
Attendance: 5,654
Referee: Miloš Milanović (Serbia)

4 June 2022
18:00

| Andorra | 0–3 | Kosovo |
|---|---|---|
| | Report | Veliu 11' (pen.); Sadriu 52'; K. Krasniqi 54' |

Estadi Nacional, Andorra la Vella
Attendance: 522
Referee: Sandi Putros (Denmark)

7 June 2022
20:45 (19:45 BST)

| England | 3–0 | Albania |
|---|---|---|
| Balogun 45', 66'; Archer 77' | Report |

Chesterfield FC Stadium, Chesterfield
Attendance: 4,422
Referee: Ivar Orri Kristjansson (Iceland)

9 June 2022
18:00

| Slovenia | 2–0 | Andorra |
|---|---|---|
| Stojinović 22'; Begić 62' | Report |

Stanko Mlakar Stadium, Kranj
Attendance: 270
Referee: Iwan Arwel Griffith (Wales)

10 June 2022
20:00

| Kosovo | 0–5 | England |
|---|---|---|
| | Report | Lewis-Potter 1'; Gordon 13'; Archer 52', 72'; I. Krasniqi 85' (o.g.) |

Fadil Vokrri Stadium, Pristina
Attendance: 4,000
Referee: Aleksandrs Anufrijevs (Latvia)

13 June 2022
18:00

| Czech Republic | 7–0 | Andorra |
|---|---|---|
| Karabec 12', 34'; Gabriel 16'; Sejk 25', 31'; Ševčík 27'; Daněk 55' | Report |

Městský fotbalový stadion Srbská, Brno
Attendance: 1,679
Referee: Marcel Birsan (Romania)
13 June 2022
19:30

| Albania | 1–1 | Kosovo |
|---|---|---|
| Ruçi 90+5' | Report | E. Krasniqi 32' |

Elbasan Arena, Elbasan
Attendance: 350
Referee: Marian Barbu (Romania)
13 June 2022
20:45 (19:45 BST)

| England | 1–2 | Slovenia |
|---|---|---|
| Archer 90+1' | Report | Spence 1' (o.g.); Zabukovnik 65' |

Kirklees Stadium, Huddersfield
Attendance: 5,236
Referee: Krzysztof Jakubik (Poland)

== Goalscorers ==
There were 78 goals scored in 30 matches, for an average of 2.6 goals per match.

6 goals

- (England) Folarin Balogun

4 goals

- (Czech Republic) Daniel Fila
- (Czech Republic) Adam Karabec
- (England) Cameron Archer
- (England) Anthony Gordon

3 goals

- (Czech Republic) Adam Gabriel
- (Czech Republic) Václav Sejk
- (Slovenia) Dušan Stojinović

2 goals

- (Albania) Bernard Karrica
- (Albania) Ernest Muçi
- (Czech Republic) Kryštof Daněk
- (Czech Republic) Pavel Šulc
- (England) Cole Palmer
- (England) Jacob Ramsey
- (England) Emile Smith Rowe
- (Kosovo) Erolind Krasniqi
- (Slovenia) David Flakus Bosilj

1 goal

- (Albania) Armando Broja
- (Albania) Armando Dobra
- (Albania) Anis Mehmeti
- (Albania) Flamur Ruçi
- (Andorra) Albert Rosas
- (Czech Republic) Tomáš Čvančara
- (Czech Republic) Tomáš Ostrák
- (Czech Republic) Michal Ševčík
- (Czech Republic) Martin Vitík
- (England) Rhian Brewster
- (England) Conor Gallagher
- (England) Morgan Gibbs-White
- (England) Curtis Jones
- (England) Keane Lewis-Potter
- (Kosovo) Dion Berisha
- (Kosovo) Kreshnik Krasniqi
- (Kosovo) Mark Marleku
- (Kosovo) Leard Sadriu
- (Kosovo) Arlind Sejdiu
- (Kosovo) Valmir Veliu
- (Slovenia) Tjaš Begić
- (Slovenia) Aljoša Matko
- (Slovenia) Mark Španring
- (Slovenia) Mark Zabukovnik
- (Slovenia) David Zec

1 own goal

- (Albania) Sergio Kalaj (against Czech Republic)
- (Andorra) Iker (against Albania)
- (England) Djed Spence (against Slovenia)
- (Kosovo) Ilir Krasniqi (against England)
