= Altin Gjokaj =

Albanian footballer (born 2005)

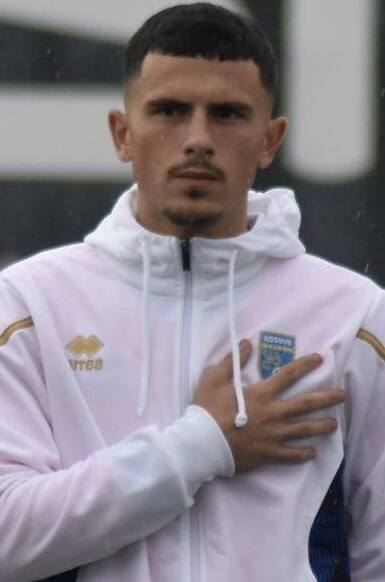
- Gjokaj in 2022

Personal information
- Date of birth: 11 November 2005 (age 20)
- Place of birth: Skenderaj, Kosovo under UN administration
- Height: 1.88 m (6 ft 2 in)
- Position: Goalkeeper

Team information
- Current team: Prishtina
- Number: 1

Youth career
- –2021: Drenica

Senior career*
Years	Team	Apps	(Gls)
2021–2022	Besa Pejë		
2022–2024	Drenica	+12	(0)
2024–	Prishtina	29	(0)

International career^{‡}
2019–2021	Kosovo U15	3	(0)
2021	Kosovo U17	7	(0)
2021–2023	Kosovo U19	4	(0)
2023–	Kosovo U21	5	(0)
- * Club domestic league appearances and goals as of 6 May 2026 ‡ National team caps and goals as of 7 June 2026

Altin Gjokaj (born 11 November 2005) is a Kosovan professional footballer who plays as a left-winger for Kosovo Superleague club Prishtina.

== Career ==
Gjokaj was born in Skenderaj and began his football career with his hometown club Drenica. In 2021, he joined Besa Pejë, where he spent one season before returning to Drenica. During the 2022–23 season, he was part of the Drenica squad that finished bottom of the Kosovo Superleague, recording six wins and 25 defeats, and was relegated to the Kosovo First League.

In 2024, Gjokaj joined Prishtina. During his first season at the club, Prishtina won the 2024–25 Kosovar Cup, qualifying for the first qualifying round of the UEFA Europa League. The club was eliminated after a 5–2 aggregate defeat to Sheriff Tiraspol.

== International career ==
Gjokaj progressed through Kosovo's youth international teams before receiving his first call-up to the Kosovo senior national team for the international friendly matches against the Czech Republic and the Andorra in May and June 2026.
