= Mark Marleku =

Kosovan footballer (born 2000)

Personal information
- Date of birth: 27 April 2000 (age 26)
- Place of birth: Lucerne, Switzerland
- Height: 1.85 m (6 ft 1 in)
- Position: Centre-forward

Team information
- Current team: Breitenrain Bern
- Number: 9

Youth career
- –2015: Zug 94
- 2015–2018: Luzern

Senior career*
Years	Team	Apps	(Gls)
2018–2020	Luzern U21	29	(12)
2020–2023	Luzern	8	(1)
2021–2023	→ Kriens (loan)	68	(13)
2023–2025	Schaffhausen	39	(3)
2025	→ Cham (loan)	15	(6)
2026–	Breitenrain Bern	16	(4)

International career^{‡}
2018	Kosovo U19	3	(0)
2021–2022	Kosovo U21	7	(1)
- * Club domestic league appearances and goals as of 1 October 2026 ‡ National team caps and goals as of 29 March 2022

Mark Marleku (born 27 April 2000) is a Kosovan professional footballer who plays as a centre-forward for Swiss club Breitenrain Bern.

== Club career ==
=== Luzern ===
On 24 June 2020, Marleku made his debut as a professional footballer in a 2–0 away defeat against Lugano after coming on as a substitute at 86th minute in place of Silvan Sidler. On 18 September 2020, he signed his first professional contract with Swiss Super League side Luzern after agreeing to a three-year deal.

=== Schaffhausen ===
On 18 July 2023, Marleku signed a one-season contract with Schaffhausen.

== International career ==
=== Under-19 ===
On 2 October 2018, Marleku was named as part of the Kosovo U19 squad for 2019 UEFA European Under-19 Championship qualifications. Eight days later, he made his debut with Kosovo U19 in 2019 UEFA European Under-19 Championship qualification match against Austria U19 after coming on as a substitute at 82nd minute in place of Bleart Tolaj.

=== Under-21 ===
On 15 March 2021, Marleku received a call-up from Kosovo U21 for the friendly matches against Qatar U23, but was unable to join the squad due to COVID-related travel restrictions. On 8 June 2021, he made his debut with Kosovo U21 in 2023 UEFA European Under-21 Championship qualification match against Andorra U21 after coming on as a substitute at 67th minute in place of Rilind Nivokazi and scored his side's second goal during a 2–0 home win.

== Career statistics ==
=== Club ===
As of 20 May 2021

Club	Season	League			Cup		Continental		Total	
Club	Season	Division	Apps	Goals	Apps	Goals	Apps	Goals	Apps	Goals
Luzern U21	2018–19	Swiss 1. Liga	15	2	0	0	—		15	2
Luzern U21	2019–20	Swiss 1. Liga	9	6	0	0	—		9	6
Luzern U21	2020–21	Swiss 1. Liga	5	4	0	0	—		5	4
Luzern U21	Total		29	12	0	0	—		29	12
Luzern	2019–20	Swiss Super League	7	1	0	0	—		7	1
Luzern	2020–21	Swiss Super League	1	0	1	0	—		2	0
Luzern	Total		8	1	1	0	—		9	1
Kriens (loan)	2020–21	Swiss Challenge League	18	5	1	0	—		19	5
Kriens (loan)	Total		18	5	1	0	—		19	5
Career total			55	18	2	0	—		57	18
