= Dion Berisha =

Kosovan footballer (born 2003)

Personal information
- Date of birth: 9 May 2003 (age 23)
- Place of birth: Lyon, France
- Height: 1.81 m (5 ft 11 in)
- Positions: Winger; forward

Team information
- Current team: Würzburger Kickers
- Number: 11

Youth career
- –2016: TSV Schwaben Augsburg
- 2016–2021: FC Augsburg

Senior career*
Years	Team	Apps	(Gls)
2020–2023	FC Augsburg II	19	(2)
2020–2023	FC Augsburg	0	(0)
2023–2024	Bayern Munich II	28	(7)
2024–2025	Rot-Weiss Essen	7	(0)
2025	→ SGV Freiberg (loan)	9	(0)
2025–	Würzburger Kickers	25	(7)

International career^{‡}
2018	Kosovo U15	2	(0)
2018	Kosovo U16	2	(1)
2019	Kosovo U17	5	(0)
2021–2023	Kosovo U21	5	(1)
- * Club domestic league appearances and goals as of 28 June 2026 ‡ National team caps and goals as of 4 October 2023

Dion Berisha (born 9 May 2003) is a professional footballer who plays as a winger and forward for 3. Liga club Würzburger Kickers. Born in France, he represented Kosovo at youth level.

== Club career ==
=== FC Augsburg ===
As a youth player, Berisha joined the academy of German side FC Augsburg. He made his professional debut with the reserve team FC Augsburg II in 2020, and later was called up with the senior team, although he failed to feature for any playing time. Berisha was regarded as one of the club's most prominent prospects.

=== Bayern Munich II ===
On 2023, he signed for Regionalliga Bayern side Bayern Munich II. On 21 July 2023, he scored a goal in his debut for the club during a 3–3 draw with SV Wacker Burghausen.

=== Rot-Weiss Essen ===
On 9 July 2024, Berisha joined 3. Liga club Rot-Weiss Essen on a permanent transfer.

== International career ==
From 2018, until 2023, Berisha has been part of Kosovo at youth international level, respectively has been part of the U15, U16, U17 and U21 teams and he with these teams played fourteen matches and scored one goal.

In October 2023, due to the negligence of the Football Federation of Kosovo, Berisha decided to play for Albania U21, where he received the called up for the UEFA Euro 2025 qualification match against Finland and Montenegro, but he could not debut because he had just debuted in the qualifiers with Kosovo and that he must wait for the other qualifiers to have the right to play.

== Personal life ==
Berisha was born in Lyon, France, to a family that originates from Pristina, Kosovo. He is the son of Ekremi Berisha.

== Style of play ==
Berisha mainly operates as a winger and has also been deployed as a forward and as an attacking midfielder.

== Career statistics ==
As of 12 April 2025

Appearances and goals by club, season and competition
Club	Season	League			Cup		Other		Total	
Club	Season	Division	Apps	Goals	Apps	Goals	Apps	Goals	Apps	Goals
FC Augsburg II	2020–21	Regionalliga Bayern	2	0	—		—		2	0
FC Augsburg II	2021–22	Regionalliga Bayern	9	2	—		—		9	2
FC Augsburg II	2022–23	Regionalliga Bayern	8	0	—		—		8	0
FC Augsburg II	Total		19	2	—		—		19	2
FC Augsburg	2021–22	Bundesliga	0	0	0	0	—		0	0
Bayern Munich II	2023–24	Regionalliga Bayern	28	7	—		—		28	7
Rot-Weiss Essen	2024–25	3. Liga	7	0	3 (Note: Appearances in Lower Rhine Cup)	1	—		10	1
SGV Freiberg (loan)	2024–25	Regionalliga Südwest	9	0	1 (Note: Appearance in Württemberg Cup)	1	—		10	1
Career total			63	9	4	2	—		67	11
