= Leon Parduzi =

Kosovo international footballer (born 2006)

- Parduzi in 2026

Personal information
- Date of birth: 10 December 2006 (age 19)
- Place of birth: Achern, Germany
- Height: 1.80 m (5 ft 11 in)
- Position: Left-back

Team information
- Current team: Holstein Kiel
- Number: 40

Youth career
- VfR Achern
- –2021: Offenburger FV
- 2021–2025: Karlsruher SC

Senior career*
Years	Team	Apps	(Gls)
2025–2026	Holstein Kiel II	21	(4)
2025–	Holstein Kiel	7	(0)

International career^{‡}
2024	Kosovo U19	4	(0)
2025–	Kosovo U21	13	(0)
- * Club domestic league appearances and goals as of 9 October 2026 ‡ National team caps and goals as of 6 October 2026

Leon Parduzi (born 10 December 2006) is a professional footballer who plays as a left-back for 2. Bundesliga club Holstein Kiel. Born in Germany, he is a Kosovo youth international.

== Club career ==
=== Early career ===
Parduzi began playing football at VfR Achern before joining the youth setup of Offenburger FV. In 2021, he moved to the academy of Karlsruher SC. At Karlsruher SC, Parduzi initially played for the under-17 team before progressing to the under-19 squad in 2023. During the 2023–24 season, he made 20 appearances in the Under 19 Bundesliga. In the following season, he played nine matches in the DFB Youth League.

Parduzi reached the final of the DFB-Pokal Junior with Karlsruher SC's under-19 team in the 2024–25 season. He played the entire final against Werder Bremen on 23 May 2025, when Karlsruher SC lost 2–0 after extra time.

=== Holstein Kiel ===
In May 2025, Parduzi joined Holstein Kiel from Karlsruher SC's under-19 team, signing a three-year contract. The club planned to develop him through its reserve team, Holstein Kiel II, while also integrating him into first-team training. During the 2025–26 season, Parduzi primarily played for Holstein Kiel II in the Oberliga Schleswig-Holstein. He made 21 league appearances and recorded ten goal contributions. His performances earned him several places in the senior team's matchday squad.

Parduzi made his professional debut in the 2. Bundesliga on 17 May 2026, the final matchday of the season, during an away game against Dynamo Dresden. He entered the match in the 74th minute and assisted Phil Harres's goal seven minutes later. Holstein Kiel eventually lost the match, but Parduzi's debut was notable for his immediate contribution to the attack.

Parduzi also featured in the first round of the DFB-Pokal in the 2026–27 season. On 22 August 2026, he came on as a substitute in the 82nd minute of Holstein Kiel's 2–0 away victory against 1860 Munich, helping the club advance to the next round.

== International career ==
Born and raised in Germany, Parduzi is of Kosovo Albanian origin from Podujevo, and was eligible to represent both Germany and Kosovo on international level. Since 2024, he is part of Kosovo at youth international level, respectively representing the U19 and U21 teams and he with these teams played seventeen matches.
