= Dean Court =

Football stadium in Bournemouth, England

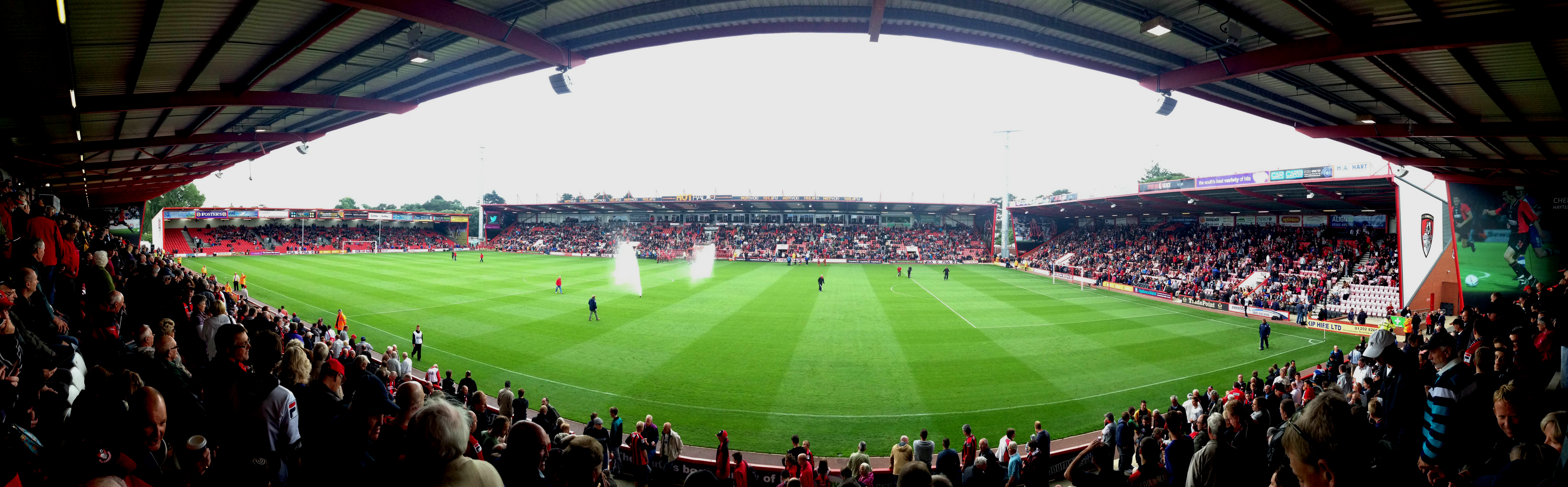
- UEFA
- Interactive map of Dean Court
- Former names: Goldsands Stadium; Seward Stadium; Fitness First Stadium
- Location: Kings Park; Bournemouth; Dorset; BH7 7AF; England
- Coordinates: 50°44′07″N 1°50′18″W
- Owner: Black Knight Football Club
- Capacity: 12,357
- Surface: Grass
- Record attendance: 28,799 (Bournemouth v Manchester United, 2 March 1957)
- Field size: 105 by 68 metres (114.8 yd × 74.4 yd)

Construction
- Built: 1910
- Opened: 1910
- Renovated: 2001
- Expanded: 2027 (estimated)

Tenant
- Bournemouth (1910–present)

Dean Court, currently known as Vitality Stadium for sponsorship purposes, is a football stadium in Boscombe, a suburb of Bournemouth, Dorset, England, and is the home ground of AFC Bournemouth. The stadium has a capacity of 12,357.

== History ==
In 1910, Boscombe were given a piece of land by the town's Cooper-Dean family, after whom the ground was named. The land was the site of an old gravel pit, and the ground was not built in time for the start of the 1910–11 season. As a result, the club played at the adjacent King's Park until moving into Dean Court in December 1910. However, the club facilities were still not ready, and players initially had to change in a nearby hotel. Early developments at the ground included a 300-seat stand.

In 1923, the club were elected to Division Three South of the Football League, at which point they changed their name to Bournemouth & Boscombe Athletic. The first Football League match was played at Dean Court on 1 September 1923, with 7,000 watching a 0–0 draw with Swindon Town. Subsequent ground improvements were made following the purchase of fittings from the British Empire Exhibition at Wembley, which allowed the construction of a 3,700-seat stand. A covered terrace was added at the southern end of the ground in 1936.

The club's record League attendance was set on 14 April 1948, when 25,495 watched a 1–0 defeat to QPR. The overall record attendance was set on 2 March 1957, when 28,799 spectators watched an FA Cup match against Manchester United. Shortly afterwards, a roof was added to the western stand. The club also purchased more land behind the northern end of the ground, with the intention of enlarging the stand and building a leisure centre. However, the club ran out of money during its construction and abandoned the scheme in 1984. As a result, the half-built structure was demolished and housing was built on that part of the site. The club's lowest Football League attendance was set on 4 March 1986, when only 1,873 saw a 2–2 drawn with Lincoln City.

The ground was completely rebuilt in 2001, with the pitch rotated ninety degrees from its original position and the ground moved away from adjacent housing. Because the work was not finished in time for the start of the 2001–02 season, Bournemouth played their first eight games at the Avenue Stadium in Dorchester. When Dean Court reopened with a game against Wrexham on 10 November, it gained its first sponsored name, becoming the Fitness First Stadium. Although it was rebuilt as a three sided stadium with a capacity of 9,600, seats were placed on the undeveloped south end in the autumn of 2005. On 24 February 2004 Bournemouth's James Hayter scored the Football League's fastest-ever hat-trick at Dean Court, scoring three goals in 2 minutes and 20 seconds during a 6–0 victory over Wrexham. The club sold the stadium in December 2005 in a sale-and-leaseback deal with London property company Structadene.

In the 2010–11 a temporary south stand was built, but was removed during the 2011–12 season after attendances fell. In July 2011 the stadium was renamed the Seward Stadium after the naming rights were sold to the Seward Motor Group. Following Seward entering administration in February 2012, the ground was subsequently renamed the Goldsands Stadium in a two-year deal. During the summer of 2013 a 2,400 seat stand was built on the undeveloped end of the ground as a result of the club's promotion to the Championship. In July 2013 it was named after former club striker Ted MacDougall.

=== Further redevelopment ===
In August 2014, chairman Jeff Mostyn revealed that the club were looking at the possibility of redeveloping the stadium, rather than moving to Matchams. With a limited capacity of 11,464 (considered small even for a League One/Tier 3 club, and until the promotion of Luton Town in 2023, the smallest in the Premier League's history), the club were exploring the option of building a new, permanent stand and filling in the stadium's corners, bringing the total seating to around 14,000, should they continue to be successful in the Premier League. The naming rights changed once more in July 2015 when the stadium became the Vitality Stadium.

In May 2016, Bournemouth announced that they would not be adding new capacity to its ground in time for the next Premier League season. The club has taken the decision to delay redevelopment plans following a meeting of its board. A statement from the Cherries blamed "ongoing negotiations with the club's landlord to purchase the stadium". The club had previously said improving the stadium's size was needed as "demand for tickets far outweighs our current capacity". Dean Court was the smallest ground in the Premier League.

In December 2016, the club announced plans to find a new site due to the ongoing issues regarding ownership of the ground.

In July 2017, the club confirmed it was looking to build a new stadium near the current site in Kings Park.

In April 2025, Bournemouth chairman Bill Foley announced that the club had agreed to buy the stadium back from Structadene, who had owned the stadium since 2005, and that instead of building a new stadium, plans were being made to redevelop the stadium in the next two and a half years, with plans to expand to around 20,000 seats, and potential to increase higher to 23,000 seats, without the need to close the stadium. In December 2025, Bournemouth, Christchurch and Poole Council granted access to land at Kings Park. In May 2026, the plans were marked to be approved, with work beginning in July 2026.

=== Damage under Storm Eunice ===
In February 2022, the stadium was damaged by Storm Eunice, an unusually intense storm. It caused an EFL Championship game against Nottingham Forest, scheduled for 18 February 2022, to be postponed.

== Other events ==
In 2013, both England Women and the England under-16 sides played games at the ground. The stadium has also been used for music concerts, hosting Elton John in 2006.

On 27 May 2023, boxer Chris Billam-Smith was the hometown underdog when he defeated Lawrence Okolie for the WBO cruiserweight championship. Local authorities granted a special licence to expand the stadium's capacity beyond its standard 11,300 seats, with a sold-out crowd of 15,000 fans attending the event at the stadium. This was the largest non-football audience in its history.

== England international games ==
=== England under-21 games ===
5 September 2017 2019 UEFA U-21 Group 4 Qualifier	England	3–0	Latvia	Bournemouth, England
Match 354	Gray 13'; Abraham 35'; Palmer 70'	Report		Stadium: Dean Court; Attendance: 8,514; Referee: Vasilis Dimitriou (Cyprus)

26 March 2019 International friendly	England	1–2	Germany	Bournemouth, England
Match 372	Solanke 43'	Report	Dahoud 27'; Uduokhai 90+1'	Stadium: Dean Court; Attendance: 10,942; Referee: Marco Di Bello (Italy)

25 March 2022 2023 UEFA U-21 Group G Qualifier	England	4–1	Andorra	Bournemouth, England
Match 396	Balogun 6'; J. Ramsey 34'; Gibbs–White 54'; Gordon 80'	Report	Rosas 65'	Stadium: Vitality Stadium; Attendance: 8,852; Referee: Jasmin Sabotic (Luxembourg)

11 October 2024 2025 UEFA U-21 Group F Qualifier	England	2–1	Ukraine	Bournemouth, England
	McAtee 88', 90+2'	Report	Mykhavko 71'	Stadium: Dean Court; Attendance: 9,858; Referee: Joakim Östling (Sweden)

=== England under-20 games ===
12 November 2014 International friendly	England	2–2	Canada	Bournemouth, England
	Akpom 15'; Cargill 85'	Report	Petrasso 48'; Hamilton 90'	Stadium: Dean Court; Attendance: 6,986; Referee: Simon Hooper (England)

=== England under-16 games ===
8 November 2013 Victory Shield	England	0–1	Northern Ireland	Bournemouth, England
		Report	Conaty 71'	Stadium: Dean Court; Attendance: 2,810; Referee: Tim Robinson (England)

=== England women games ===
21 September 2013 2015 FIFA Women's World Cup qualification – UEFA Group 6	England	6–0	Belarus	Bournemouth, England
	Carney 3', 26', 40'; White 13'; Dowie 60'; Aluko 62'	Report		Stadium: Dean Court; Attendance: 6,818; Referee: Riem Hussein (Germany)
