= SS Taranto Calcio =

Italian football club

Taranto
- Full name: Società Sportiva Taranto 2025 S.r.l.
- Nicknames: Gli Ionici (The Ionians); I Rossoblù (The Red and Blue); I Delfini (The Dolphins)
- Founded: 1927; 99 years ago 1993 as Taranto Calcio; 2012 as Taranto FC; 2025; 1 year ago (refounded)
- Ground: Stadio Erasmo Iacovone, Taranto, Italy
- Capacity: 27,584
- Chairman: Sebastiano Ladisa
- Manager: Luca Tiozzo
- League: Eccellenza Apulia
- 2025–26: Eccellenza Apulia, 3rd of 20
- Website: https://www.sstarantocalcio.it
Home colours	Away colours	Third colours

Società Sportiva Taranto 2025, commonly referred to as Taranto, is a professional Italian football club, based in Taranto, Apulia. Originally founded in 1927 by the union of two pioneering clubs that created the first city squad, Taranto currently plays in Eccellenza Apulia. Taranto is 19th in the all-time Serie B ranking, though Taranto has not played in Serie B since 1993, having played in the "serie cadetta" 31 times, more than any other Italian club which never played in Serie A.

== History ==
=== A.S. Taranto ===
The first team ever founded in the city of Taranto was the Mario Rapisardi, established in 1904. However, in 1904 another team, U.S. Pro Italia, was founded. That year, the two teams attempted unsuccessfully to merge with each other. In 1911, after the founding of Audace Foot Ball Club by a group of local students, a rivalry between the two teams started, lasting until 1927, when the two teams merged to form A.S. Taranto. The new team first promoted to Serie B in 1935, played only one year in that category. In 1947, after merging with U.S. Arsenale Taranto, another team in the city, the club assumed the name of U.S. Arsenaltaranto, which lasted until 1955, when the old one was restored. In 1965, the new venue was inaugurated, after a hundred days of construction. A number of years played in Serie B and Serie C saw the highest peak ever reached by Taranto in 1977–1978, when the team, led by striker Erasmo Iacovone, was seriously fighting for a surprising promotion. However, on 6 February 1978, Iacovone was killed in a car accident. After his death, Taranto's venue was named after him. Taranto left Serie B in 1980/1981 and reached it again three years later. In 1985 the club was declared bankrupt by magistrates, and was taken over before the end of that season. Because of all that, it was forced to change its name to a different one, Taranto Football Club SpA. However, after more economic woes, the team was disbanded in 1993.

=== Another club ===
A new team, named Taranto Calcio 1906, was established in 1993 and registered to Serie D by the FIGC. The team reached Serie C2/C in 1994/1995, but went into liquidation in 1998, so that a new team, again named U.S. Arsenaltaranto, was admitted to Serie D. In 2000 it was admitted to Serie C2/C, and changed its name to Taranto Calcio Srl. However, in 2004 the team was declared bankrupt one more time, and the consequent bankruptcy auction entrusted the club in the hands of businessman Vito Luigi Blasi, who changed its name in Taranto Sport Srl. In 2005/2006, the team ended second, gaining a spot in the promotion play-offs. The final phase of the Serie C2/C league ended in a triumph for Taranto Sport, which won the playoff finals against Rende and returned to Serie C1/B.

On 29 June 2012 it was excluded from Italian professional football and did not take its place in the 2012–13 championship of Lega Pro Prima Divisione.

=== Taranto Football Club 1927 ===

On 20 July 2012 the new company Taranto Football Club 1927 S.p.A. was established. It restarted from the Serie D (Girone H) thanks to Article 52 of N.O.I.F. In 2013 the team finished 7th in the league. In 2014 it ended the season in second place and lost to Arezzo in the play-offs. The next season ended in similar fashion, with Taranto ending the season in second place and losing in the play-offs semifinal to Sestri Levante.

In 2015 the club was renamed to Società Sportiva Dilettantistica Taranto Football Club 1927. In 2016 the team finished the season in second place and lost in the play-offs to Fondi, but eventually benefitted from a repechage and promoted to Lega Pro. The following season Taranto finished 20th in Lega Pro/C and thus got relegated back to Serie D after just one season. In 2017–18 the team finished 4th in Serie D/H and lost to Cavese the playoff final. A year later the team finished 3rd in Serie D/H but again lost in the playoff final, this time to Audace Cerignola. The team finished 6th in 2019–20 Serie D/H, thus failing to qualify for the playoffs. In 2020-21, Taranto finished in first place in Group H, thus securing promotion to Serie C.

In the 2024–25 Serie C season, Taranto experienced financial difficulties. It failed to pay salaries and fees, and suffered consecutive point deductions as punishment, with 19 points deducted by late January 2025, taking the last spot in the table with negative 6 points. However, they continued to play (fielding their Under-19 squad, and playing home games behind closed doors), as dropping out of the competition would mean they would not be allowed to play in Serie D in the 2025–26 season. In the end, this was not enough and the club was excluded from the 2024–25 Serie C season on 7 March 2025.

=== S.S. Taranto Calcio ===
In September 2025, the club restarted from Eccellenza Apulia with a new denomination, Società Sportiva Taranto Calcio. So, Taranto finished 3rd (after Brindisi and Bisceglie), qualifying for the playoffs: the team beat Canosa in regional match and Apice in national semifinals. But Gladiator won 1-2 in final with Taranto due an injury time goal: Taranto didn't go in Serie D.

== Colours and badge ==
The team's colours are red and blue.

== Current squad ==
As of 6 March 2025

Note: Flags indicate national team as defined under FIFA eligibility rules; some limited exceptions apply. Players may hold more than one non-FIFA nationality.

No.	Pos.	Nation	Player
5	DF	GAM	Bubacarr Marong
14	MF	ITA	Francesco Verde
18	MF	ITA	Giammarco Schirru
22	GK	ITA	Federico Constantino
27	MF	ITA	Ottavio Garau (on loan from Ternana)
32	FW	ITA	Giuseppe Giovinco

No.	Pos.	Nation	Player
33	MF	USA	Claudio Vaughn
42	MF	ITA	Mattia Speranza
44	DF	ITA	Michele Picardi
77	FW	ITA	Patrizio Zerbo
80	DF	ITA	Gianluca Fiorentino
99	FW	ITA	Giuseppe Simone
