= Florent Hajdini =

Kosovan footballer

Personal information
- Date of birth: 2 September 2006 (age 20)
- Place of birth: Salzburg, Austria
- Height: 1.71 m (5 ft 7 in)
- Position: Defensive midfielder

Team information
- Current team: SKU Amstetten
- Number: 6

Youth career
- 2012–2020: Red Bull Salzburg
- 2020–2023: Wolfsberger AC

Senior career*
Years	Team	Apps	(Gls)
2022–2026	Wolfsberger AC II	78	(3)
2022–2026	Wolfsberger AC	1	(0)
2026–	SKU Amstetten	11	(0)

International career^{‡}
2021–2022	Austria U16	7	(1)
2022–2023	Austria U17	7	(0)
2023–2024	Austria U18	6	(1)
2024	Austria U19	6	(1)
2026–	Kosovo U21	1	(0)
- * Club domestic league appearances and goals as of 21 November 2026 ‡ National team caps and goals as of 16 November 2026

Florent Hajdini (born 2 September 2006) is a professional footballer who plays as a defensive midfielder for Austrian Second League club SKU Amstetten. Born in Austria, he represented that nation at youth international levels but in 2026 switched to play for Kosovo national under-21 team.

== Club career ==
=== Youth career ===
Hajdini began his football career at Red Bull Salzburg, where he spent the early years of his development. In 2020, he moved to the academy of Wolfsberger AC, continuing his development within the club's youth system.

During the 2021–22 season, Hajdini featured for Wolfsberger's under-16 side, making 20 appearances and scoring three goals. He also represented the club's under-18 team, for which he made nine appearances between the 2021–22 and 2023–24 seasons.

=== Wolfsberger AC ===
Hajdini progressed from the academy to Wolfsberger AC II, the club's reserve team competing in the Austrian Regionalliga. He became a regular member of the side during the 2022–23 season, making 26 league appearances and scoring once. He subsequently made 24 appearances in 2023–24, 13 in 2024–25 and 15 in 2025–26. Across four seasons, he recorded 78 appearances and three goals for the reserve team.

During his time at Wolfsberger, Hajdini also received opportunities with the senior side. He made his debut in the Austrian Bundesliga on 10 August 2025, during the 2025–26 season, when he came on in the 88th minute for David Atanga in a 2–0 away victory against Austria Wien. This remained his only Bundesliga appearance for the club.

After the conclusion of the 2025–26 season, Hajdini departed Wolfsberger AC, having spent several years in its academy and reserve setup before making his senior-team debut.

=== SKU Amstetten ===
On 2 July 2026, Hajdini joined SKU Amstetten ahead of the 2026–27 season, moving to the Austrian Second League after leaving Wolfsberger AC.

Hajdini was recruited to strengthen Amstetten's midfield, with sporting director Thomas Gebauer describing him as a technically gifted young player whose playing style suited the club's plans. The move also provided Hajdini with an opportunity to establish himself in senior football and gain more regular playing time.

On 9 October 2026, Hajdini featured in Amstetten's 1–1 draw against Blau-Weiß Linz. Four days later, he was voted 2. Liga Player of the Round 8 following a supporters' poll organised by Ligaportal. Amstetten manager Andreas Gahleitner praised his performance in the defensive midfield position, particularly considering that he had only recently returned from an injury.

== International career ==
=== Austria ===
Hajdini represented Austria at four youth international levels, making a total of 26 appearances and scoring three goals for the under-16, under-17, under-18 and under-19 teams.

He first featured for Austria's under-16 team in October 2021, recording seven appearances and one goal at that level. He subsequently progressed to the under-17 side, making his debut against Denmark in September 2022. During his time with the under-17 team, he made seven appearances.

Between September 2023 and May 2024, Hajdini made six appearances for Austria's under-18 team, scoring once. He subsequently progressed to the under-19 side, for which he also recorded six appearances and one goal in 2024. His final appearance for an Austrian youth national team came on 19 November 2024, when he featured against Spain in the UEFA Euro 2025 qualifying campaign.

In early November 2026, Hajdini was initially placed on the standby list for Austria's under-21 squad ahead of the November international period, but he turned down the call-up, as he had already decided to represent Kosovo national under-21 team.

=== Kosovo ===
On 7 November 2026, Hajdini formalised his decision to represent Kosovo and accepted a call-up to the national under-21 team for the friendly match against Luxembourg, and made his debut in the starting line-up, playing the entire match before being sent off in the closing minutes after receiving two yellow cards.
