= Faton Ademi =

Kosovar footballer

Personal information
- Date of birth: 19 May 2006 (age 20)
- Place of birth: Aachen, Germany
- Height: 1.80 m (5 ft 11 in)
- Position: Midfielder

Team information
- Current team: Greuther Fürth
- Number: 37

Youth career
- –2019: Alemannia Aachen
- 2019–2022: SV 1914 Eilendorf
- 2022–2024: Alemannia Aachen

Senior career*
Years	Team	Apps	(Gls)
2025–2026	Alemannia Aachen	41	(7)
2026–	Greuther Fürth	3	(0)

International career^{‡}
2023	Kosovo U19	1	(0)
2025–	Kosovo U21	11	(3)
- * Club domestic league appearances and goals as of 18 September 2026 ‡ National team caps and goals as of 7 October 2026

Faton Ademi (born 19 May 2006) is a professional footballer who plays as a midfielder for 2. Bundesliga club Greuther Fürth. Born in Germany, he is a Kosovo youth international.

== Club career ==
=== Alemannia Aachen ===
Ademi began his career in the youth system of Alemannia Aachen, where he remained until 2019. He then joined SV 1914 Eilendorf, spending two and a half years at the club before returning to Alemannia Aachen in January 2022. After his return, he continued his development within Aachen's youth system, representing the club at under-17 and under-19 level. He subsequently became captain of the club's under-19 side.

In July 2024, Ademi signed his first professional contract with Alemannia Aachen. Following the signing, he joined the first-team training group while continuing to gain match experience with the club's youth teams. Ademi made his senior debut for Alemannia Aachen during the 2024–25 season, he first appeared for the first team in the Bitburger-Pokal before making his 3. Liga debut later in the season. His debut with Alemannia Aachen came on 11 March 2025 against FC Ingolstadt after coming on as a substitute at 88th minute in place of Lukas Scepanik.

In 2025–26 season, Ademi became a regular player of the club and had 35 appearances in the 3. Liga.

=== Greuther Fürth ===
On 1 September 2026, Ademi signed a three-year contract with 2. Bundesliga club Greuther Fürth and receiving squad number 37.

== International career ==
In September 2023, Ademi becomes part of Kosovo U19 with which he made his debut in a 2–0 home win against Liechtenstein after being named in the starting line-up. On 15 March 2025, Ademi received a call-up from Kosovo U21 for the friendly matches against Turkey and Moldova, and made his debut in the friendly match against Turkey after coming on as a substitute in the 71st minute in place of Arlind Maloku.

On 18 September 2026, Ademi received a call-up from the Kosovo senior national team for the 2026–27 UEFA Nations League matches against the Republic of Ireland, Austria (twice), and Israel.
