= Erasmo Iacovone =

Italian association football player (1952–1978)

Erasmo Iacovone (22 April 1952 - 6 February 1978) was an Italian footballer who was last known to have played as a striker for Taranto.

== Early life ==
Iacovone was born in Capracotta, Italy, in 1952.

== Career ==
Iacovone started his career with Italian fourth tier side OMI Roma. After that, he signed for Italian second-tier side Taranto.

== Death ==
Iacovone died on 6 February 1978 due to a car accident.
