= Rogaçicë =

Rogaçicë: Rogaçicë (Albanian); Рогачица/Rogačica (Serbian)
- Village
- Interactive map of Rogaçicë
- Coordinates: 42°33′20″N 21°40′59″E
- Country: Kosovo
- District: Gjilan
- Municipality: Kamenicë

Population (2024)
  - Total: 1,904
- Time zone: UTC+1 (Central European Time)
  - Summer (DST): UTC+2 (CEST)

Rogaçicë is a village in the Kamenicë municipality, eastern Kosovo.
