= Kosovo national under-15 football team =

National association football team

Kosovo
- Nickname: Dardanët (Dardanians)
- Association: Federata e Futbollit e Kosovës (FFK)
- Confederation: UEFA (Europe)
- Head coach: Isa Sadriu; Gazmend Haliti
- Captain: Rotation
- Top scorer: Elton Krasniqi (8)
- Home stadium: FFK National Educational Camp
- FIFA code: KVX
First colours	Second colours	Third colours

First international
- Albania 1–1 Kosovo (Elbasan, Albania; 3 May 2018)

Biggest win
- Kosovo 8–0 Tajikistan (Kamëz, Albania; 19 September 2019)

The Kosovo national under-15 football team (Albanian: Kombëtarja e futbollit të Kosovës nën 15 vjeç; Serbian: Фудбалска репрезентација Косова до 15. године, romanized: Fudbalska reprezentacija Kosova do 15. godine) is the national under-15 football team of Kosovo and is controlled by the Football Federation of Kosovo.

== History ==
=== Permitting by FIFA to play friendlies ===
On 6 February 2013, FIFA gave the permission to play international friendly games against other member associations. Whereas, on 13 January 2014, there was a change of this permit that forbade Kosovo to play against the national teams of the countries of the former Yugoslavia. Club teams were also allowed to play friendlies and this happened after a FIFA Emergency Committee meeting. However, it was stipulated that clubs and representative teams of the Football Federation of Kosovo may not display national symbols as flags, emblems, etc. or play national anthems. The go-ahead was given after meetings between the Football Association of Serbia and Sepp Blatter.

=== Membership in UEFA and FIFA ===
In September 2015 at an UEFA Executive Committee meeting in Malta was approved the request from the federation to the admission in UEFA to the next Ordinary Congress to be held in Budapest. On 3 May 2016, at the Ordinary Congress. Kosovo were accepted into UEFA after members voted 28–24 in favor of Kosovo. Ten days later, Kosovo was accepted in FIFA during their 66th congress in Mexico with 141 votes in favour and 23 against.

=== First match ===
Kosovo in most of the time has organized training camps in Kosovo and Europe with different players from the local championship and diaspora. On 3 May 2018, Kosovo for first time in its history played a friendly match against Albania and the match ended with a 1–1 away draw and the starting line-up of that match was Rijad Bytyqi (GK), Albert Raçi, Albin Nishori, Arian Hetemi, Dardan Ibishi, Diar Halili, Dion Berisha, Eduard Ibrahimi, Elion Mahmuti, Ilhan Majić and Sadri Pacolli.

== Competitive record ==
=== UEFA U15 Development Tournament ===
Kosovo participated in the UEFA U15 Development Tournament for the first time in August 2019, where took first place after winning two matches against Albania (2–1) and North Macedonia (0–1) and drew without goals against Montenegro. One month later, Kosovo again participated in the UEFA U15 Development Tournament, where again took first place after winning all three matches against Tajikistan (8–0), Estonia (3–0) and Albania (0–1).

Year	Round	Pos	Pld	W	D	L	GF	GA
(North Macedonia) August 2019	Winners	1st	3	2	1	0	3	1
(Albania) September 2019	Winners	1st	3	3	0	0	12	0
Total	Winners	2/2	6	5	1	0	15	1

== Players ==
=== Current squad ===
- The following players have been called up for the 2019 UEFA U15 Development Tournament.

No.	Pos.	Player	Date of birth (age)	Club
	GK	Erion Mala	1 January 2005 (age 21)	(Football Federation of Kosovo) Feronikeli
	GK	Altin Gjoka	11 November 2005 (age 21)	(Football Federation of Kosovo) Drenica
	DF	Bleron Hashani	4 January 2005 (age 21)	(Football Federation of Kosovo) Urbano Raskovë
	DF	Erblin Thaqi	15 January 2005 (age 21)	(German Football Association) Hannover 96
	DF	Alp Shahini	9 February 2005 (age 21)	(Football Federation of Kosovo) Dinamo Ferizaj
	DF	Erolind Rudari	20 February 2005 (age 21)	(Football Federation of Kosovo) Rroni 19
	DF	Erion Zeka	22 April 2005 (age 21)	(Football Federation of Kosovo) 2 Korriku
	DF	Rigon Xhaferi	4 May 2005 (age 21)	(Football Federation of Kosovo) 2 Korriku
	DF	Nderim Avdullahu	11 June 2005 (age 21)	(Football Federation of Kosovo) 2 Korriku
	DF	Dren Dobruna	29 July 2005 (age 21)	(United States Soccer Federation) New York Red Bulls
	MF	Lorent Talla	1 January 2005 (age 21)	(The Football Association) Queens Park Rangers
	MF	Erion Ramushi	8 January 2005 (age 21)	(Football Federation of Kosovo) Ardhmëria Ferizaj
	MF	Emin Reçica	17 January 2005 (age 21)	(Football Federation of Kosovo) 2 Korriku
	MF	Ariol Bllaca	20 February 2005 (age 21)	(Football Federation of Kosovo) 2 Korriku
	MF	Leon Toska	18 April 2005 (age 21)	(Swiss Football Association) Winterthur
	MF	Leon Reçica	5 September 2005 (age 21)	(Swiss Football Association) Winterthur
	FW	Elton Krasniqi	27 February 2005 (age 21)	(Football Federation of Kosovo) 2 Korriku
	FW	Armend Maroshi	11 March 2005 (age 21)	(Croatian Football Federation) Cibalia
	FW	Igball Jashari	14 July 2005 (age 21)	(Football Federation of Kosovo) Kurda
	FW	Leart Halimi	8 August 2005 (age 21)	(German Football Association) Hertha BSC

== Coaching staff ==
Position	Name
Head coach(es)	(Kosovo) Isa Sadriu
Head coach(es)	(Kosovo) Gazmend Haliti
Goalkeeping coach	(Kosovo) Xhelal Karabegu
Physiotherapist	(Kosovo) Mentor Sfishta
Device manager	(Kosovo) Sahit Salihu
Team manager	(Kosovo) Rinor Havolli
Technical director	(Slovenia) Primož Gliha

== Head-to-head records against other countries ==
As of 23 September 2019

Opponent	Pld	W	D	L	GF	GA	GD	Win %
Albania	4	2	2	0	5	3	+2	50.00
Estonia	1	1	0	0	3	0	+3	100.00
Montenegro	1	0	1	0	0	0	+0	0.00
North Macedonia	1	1	0	0	1	0	+1	100.00
Tajikistan	1	1	0	0	8	0	+8	100.00
5 Countries	8	5	3	0	17	3	+14	62.50

== See also ==
Men's

- National team
- Under-21
- Under-19
- Under-17
- Futsal

Women's

- National team
- Under-19

== Notes and references ==
=== Notes ===
1. The club listed is the club for which the player last played a competitive match prior to the tournament.
