= Ilir Krasniqi =

Kosovan footballer (born 2000)

Personal information
- Date of birth: 2 April 2000 (age 26)
- Place of birth: Bocholt, Germany
- Height: 1.89 m (6 ft 2 in)
- Position: Centre-back

Team information
- Current team: Polissya Zhytomyr
- Number: 16

Youth career
- –2020: Fushë Kosova
- 2020–2021: KEK

Senior career*
Years	Team	Apps	(Gls)
2021–2024	Llapi	100	(4)
2024–2026	Kolos Kovalivka	36	(1)
2026–	Polissya Zhytomyr	12	(0)

International career^{‡}
2018	Kosovo U19	2	(0)
2022	Kosovo U21	5	(1)
2022–	Kosovo	25	(0)
- * Club domestic league appearances and goals as of 3 June 2026 ‡ National team caps and goals as of 17:10, 18 November 2026 (UTC)

Ilir Krasniqi (born 2 April 2000) is a professional footballer who plays as a centre-back for Ukrainian Premier League club Polissya Zhytomyr. Born in Germany, he plays for the Kosovo national team.

== Club career ==
=== Llapi ===
On 23 December 2020, Krasniqi signed a five-year contract with Kosovo Superleague club Llapi, and received squad number 16.

=== Kolos Kovalivka ===
On 11 September 2024, Llapi announced the transfer of Krasniqi to Ukrainian Premier League club Kolos Kovalivka. Five days later, the club confirmed that Krasniqi's transfer was permanent and received squad number 16, on the same day he made his debut with Kolos Kovalivka against LNZ Cherkasy after being named in the starting line-up. Kolos Kovalivka reportedly paid a €300,000 transfer fee.

== International career ==
From 2018, until 2022, Krasniqi is part of Kosovo at youth international level, respectively part of the under-19 and under-21 teams and he with these teams played seven matches. On 30 May 2022, he received a call-up from the senior team for training session before the 2022–23 UEFA Nations League matches against Cyprus, Greece and Northern Ireland, but did not make the final squad.

On 16 September 2022, Krasniqi received again a call-up from Kosovo for the 2022–23 UEFA Nations League matches against Northern Ireland and Cyprus. His debut with Kosovo came eleven days after call-up in a 2022–23 UEFA Nations League match against Cyprus after coming on as a substitute at 89th minute in place of Florent Hadergjonaj.
