= Adis Nurković =

Bosnian-born Kosovan footballer and coach (born 1986)

Personal information
- Date of birth: 28 April 1986 (age 40)
- Place of birth: Velika Kladuša, SR Bosnia and Herzegovina, SFR Yugoslavia
- Height: 1.95 m (6 ft 5 in)
- Position: Goalkeeper

Youth career
- 2000–2001: Krajišnik Velika Kladuša
- 2001–2003: Jedinstvo Bihać

Senior career*
Years	Team	Apps	(Gls)
2003–2005	Jedinstvo Bihać	1	(0)
2005–2006	Slavonija Požega	23	(0)
2006–2007	Krajina Cazin	13	(0)
2007	Cibalia	0	(0)
2007–2010	Travnik	76	(0)
2010–2011	Slaven Belupo	1	(0)
2011–2014	Čelik Zenica	37	(0)
2014–2017	Travnik	67	(0)
2017–2018	Flamurtari Vlorë	30	(0)
2018–2019	Tuzla City	6	(0)
2019–2022	Čelik Zenica		
Total		254	(0)

International career
2004	Bosnia and Herzegovina U18	1	(0)
2006–2008	Bosnia and Herzegovina U21	5	(0)
2009	Bosnia and Herzegovina	1	(0)
2017	Kosovo	1	(0)
2024	Bosnia and Herzegovina (minifootball)	5	(0)

Managerial career
- 2020–2022: Čelik Zenica (player-goalkeeping coach)
- 2022–2023: Čelik Zenica (goalkeeping coach)
- 2023–2024: Sarajevo (goalkeeping coach)
- * Club domestic league appearances and goals

Adis Nurković (Albanian: Nurkoviq; born 28 April 1986) is a Bosnian-born Kosovan professional football manager and former player who played as a goalkeeper. He was most recently the goalkeeping coach of Sarajevo.

== Club career ==
=== Early career ===
Nurković was born into a Bosnian Muslim family in the Bosnian town of Velika Kladuša, on 28 April 1986. He started playing football at the age of 14 in his hometown club Krajišnik Velika Kladuša, where after a year he was transferred to Jedinstvo Bihać for which he made his first team debut as a fifteen-year-old in a match against Zrinjski Mostar. Nurković besides being was part of Slavonija Požega (2005–2006), Krajina Cazin (2006–2007), Cibalia (2007) and Travnik (2007–2010).

=== Slaven Belupo ===
On 21 June 2010, Nurković joined Croatian First League side Slaven Belupo, to replace the departed Tomislav Pelin as the second choice. His debut with Slaven Belupo came on 10 November in the 2010–11 Croatian Cup quarter-finals against NK Zagreb after being named in the starting line-up.

=== Čelik Zenica ===
On 26 June 2011, Nurković joined Bosnian Premier League side Čelik Zenica, to replace the departed Luka Bilobrk as the second choice. His debut with Čelik Zenica came on 6 August against Velež Mostar after being named in the starting line-up.

=== Return to Travnik ===
On 1 February 2014, Nurković joined Bosnian Premier League side Travnik. His debut with Travnik came on 2 March against Slavija Sarajevo after being named in the starting line-up.

=== Flamurtari Vlorë ===
On 15 June 2017, Nurković joined Kategoria Superiore side Flamurtari Vlorë, to replace the departed Stivi Frashëri as the first choice. His debut with Flamurtari Vlorë came on 9 September 2017 against Skënderbeu Korçë after being named in the starting line-up.

=== Tuzla City ===
On 7 June 2018, Nurković joined with the newly promoted team of Bosnian Premier League side Tuzla City. On 24 November 2018, he made his debut in a 1–2 home defeat against Zrinjski Mostar after being named in the starting line-up. After a year with Tuzla City as mixed choice, it was confirmed that Nurković had left the club.

=== Return to Čelik Zenica and retirement ===
On 18 June 2019, Nurković returned to Bosnian Premier League side Čelik Zenica after agreeing to a three-year deal, where it was mainly as a backup choice and he finished the season without any appearances. On 16 July 2020, three days after Čelik Zenica was excluded to the League of Zenica-Doboj Canton because of financial difficulties, it was announced that Nurković was to stay in the club both as a player and goalkeeping coach.

== International career ==
=== Bosnia and Herzegovina ===
==== Youth ====
In March 2004, Nurković became part of Bosnia and Herzegovina U18 for which he made his debut in a 3–0 away defeat against Slovenia after being named in the starting line-up.

In September 2005, Nurković received a call-up from Bosnia and Herzegovina U21 and was an unused substitute in the 2006 UEFA European Under-21 Championship qualification matches against Belgium, and Lithuania. On 26 July 2006, he again received a call-up from Bosnia and Herzegovina U21 for a friendly match against Croatia, where six days later he made his debut after coming on as a substitute at 46th minute in place of Jasmin Burić.

==== Senior ====
Unofficial debuts

In June 2008, Nurković received a call-up from Bosnia and Herzegovina and was an unused substitute in the friendly match against Azerbaijan. On 11 February 2009, he made his unofficial debut with Bosnia and Herzegovina in a 3–2 away defeat against Croatian First League side Rijeka after being named in the starting line-up. On 11 September 2008, Nurković received a call-up from Bosnia and Herzegovina A2 for a friendly match against England C, where five days later he made his debut after being named in the starting line-up.

Official debut

In March 2009, Nurković again received a call-up for the senior team, being an unused substitute in the 2010 FIFA World Cup qualification matches against Belgium. His senior international debut for Bosnia and Herzegovina was on 12 August 2009 in the friendly match against Iran after coming on as a substitute at 63rd minute in place of Nemanja Supić.

=== Kosovo ===
Nurković was invited by coach Albert Bunjaki to play for the Kosovo national team after Bunjaki was impressed by his performances at Travnik. As he is married to a Kosovan citizen from Prizren, he is eligible for Kosovo citizenship and FIFA's rules allow Nurković to play for any national side resulting from the break-up of SFR Yugoslavia as he was born during the country's existence.

On 30 August 2016, Nurković received a call-up from Kosovo for the 2018 FIFA World Cup qualification match against Finland, but he was not available for this match after FIFA did not permit him to play for Kosovo due to problems with his documentation. On 2 October 2016, Nurković again received a call-up from Kosovo for the 2018 FIFA World Cup qualification matches against Croatia and Ukraine. Three days later, FIFA gave him permission to play for Kosovo. His debut with Kosovo came on 11 June 2017 in a 2018 FIFA World Cup qualification against Turkey after coming on as a substitute at 53rd minute in place of injured Samir Ujkani.

=== Unofficial return to Bosnia and Herzegovina ===
After retiring from football, Nurković decided to return and represent Bosnia and Herzegovina in minifootball, where in June 2024 he was selected in the Bosnia and Herzegovina squad for 2024 EMF EURO, where he played in all five of Bosnia and Herzegovina's matches.
