= Rayan Zinebi =

Spanish footballer

Personal information
- Full name: Rayan Zinebi Talbi
- Date of birth: 18 March 2007 (age 19)
- Place of birth: Barcelona, Spain
- Height: 1.77 m (5 ft 10 in)
- Position: Forward

Team information
- Current team: Real Madrid C (on loan from Granada)
- Number: 24

Youth career
- 2020–2023: Cornellà
- 2023–2025: Prat
- 2025–2026: Granada

Senior career*
Years	Team	Apps	(Gls)
2024–2025	Prat	12	(0)
2025–	Granada B	24	(7)
2025–	Granada	2	(0)
2026–	→ Real Madrid C (loan)	0	(0)

International career
2026–	Morocco U20	3	(1)
- * Club domestic league appearances and goals as of 9 June 2026

Rayan Zinebi Talbi (born 18 March 2007) is a professional footballer who plays as a forward for Spanish club Real Madrid C, on loan from Recreativo Granada. Born in Spain, he represents Morocco at youth international level.

== Club career ==
Born Barcelona, Catalonia to Moroccan parents, Zinebi began his career with UE Cornellà before moving to AE Prat in 2023. He made his first team debut with the latter on 1 December 2024, in a 1–0 Tercera Federación home loss to FC L'Escala, and renewed his link until 2028 five days later.

On 3 September 2025, Zinebi moved to Granada CF, being initially assigned to the Juvenil squad. He soon began to appear (and score) with the reserves also in the fifth division, before starting to train with the main squad in December.

Zinebi made his first team debut with the Nazaríes on 22 March 2026, coming on as a late substitute for Gonzalo Petit in a 2–0 Segunda División away win over Real Sociedad B. On 28 August, he renewed his contract with the club until 2029, and was immediately loaned to Real Madrid C.

== International career ==
Eligible to play for Morocco and Spain, Zinebi was called up to the former's under-20 team on 19 March 2026, to play in a local competition.
