= Flamur Ruçi =

Albanian footballer

Personal information
- Date of birth: 19 January 2002 (age 24)
- Place of birth: Berat, Albania
- Position: Midfielder

Team information
- Current team: Egnatia Rrogozhinë
- Number: 88

Youth career
- 2014–2019: Tomori Berat
- 2019–2020: Luftëtari

Senior career*
Years	Team	Apps	(Gls)
2017–2019	Tomori Berat	1	(0)
2019–2020	Luftëtari Gjirokastër	0	(0)
2020–2025	Bylis Ballsh	97	(16)
2025–	Egnatia Rrogozhinë	34	(3)

International career^{‡}
2020	Albania U20	2	(0)
- * Club domestic league appearances and goals as of 25 June 2026 ‡ National team caps and goals as of 30 May 2022

Flamur Ruçi (born 19 January 2002) is an Albanian professional footballer who plays as a midfielder for Kategoria Superiore club Egnatia Rrogozhinë.

== Career statistics ==
=== Club ===
As of 30 May 2022

Club	Season	League			Cup		Continental		Other		Total	
Club	Season	Division	Apps	Goals	Apps	Goals	Apps	Goals	Apps	Goals	Apps	Goals
Tomori Berat	Kategoria e Parë	2017–18	1	0	0	0	–		0	0	1	0
Tomori Berat	Kategoria e Parë	2018–19	0	0	0	0	–		0	0	0	0
Tomori Berat	Total		1	0	0	0	0	0	0	0	1	0
Tomori Berat	Kategoria Superiore	2019–20	0	0	0	0	–		0	0	0	0
Tomori Berat	Total		0	0	0	0	0	0	0	0	0	0
Bylis	Kategoria Superiore	2020–21	2	0	1	0	–		0	0	3	0
Bylis	Kategoria e Parë	2021–22	26	6	2	0	–		0	0	28	6
Bylis	Kategoria Superiore	2022–23	0	0	0	0	–		0	0	0	0
Bylis	Total		28	6	3	0	0	0	0	0	31	6
Career total			29	6	3	0	0	0	0	0	32	6
