= Kosovo national under-17 football team =

National football team

Kosovo
- Nickname: Dardanët (Dardanians)
- Association: Federata e Futbollit e Kosovës (FFK)
- Confederation: UEFA (Europe)
- Head coach: Arsim Abazi
- Captain: Rotation
- Home stadium: FFK National Educational Camp
- FIFA code: KVX
First colours	Second colours	Third colours

First international
- Netherlands 3–1 Kosovo (Budapest, Hungary; 10 October 2017)

Biggest win
- Switzerland 0–1 Kosovo (Paphos, Cyprus; 29 October 2018); Kosovo 1–0 Cyprus (Pegeia, Cyprus; 1 November 2018)

Biggest defeat
- Greece 5–0 Kosovo (Podujevë, Kosovo; 8 October 2022); Records of first international and biggest win/defeat are for competitive matches only

The Kosovo national under-17 football team (Albanian: Kombëtarja e futbollit të Kosovës nën 17 vjeç; Serbian: Фудбалска репрезентација Косова до 17. године, romanized: Fudbalska reprezentacija Kosova do 17. godine) is the national under-17 football team of Kosovo and is controlled by the Football Federation of Kosovo.

== History ==
=== Permitting by FIFA to play friendlies ===
On 6 February 2013, FIFA gave the permission to play international friendly games against other member associations. Whereas, on 13 January 2014, there was a change of this permit that forbade Kosovo to play against the national teams of the countries of the former Yugoslavia. Club teams were also allowed to play friendlies and this happened after a FIFA Emergency Committee meeting. However, it was stipulated that clubs and representative teams of the Football Federation of Kosovo may not display national symbols as flags, emblems, etc. or play national anthems. The go-ahead was given after meetings between the Football Association of Serbia and Sepp Blatter.

=== Membership in UEFA and FIFA ===
In September 2015 at an UEFA Executive Committee meeting in Malta was approved the request from the federation to the admission in UEFA to the next Ordinary Congress to be held in Budapest. On 3 May 2016, at the Ordinary Congress. Kosovo were accepted into UEFA after members voted 28–24 in favor of Kosovo. Ten days later, Kosovo was accepted in FIFA during their 66th congress in Mexico with 141 votes in favour and 23 against.

== Competition record ==
=== UEFA European Championship ===
On 26 January 2017, in Nyon, it was decided that Kosovo should be part in Group 9 of the 2018 UEFA European Under-17 Championship qualification, together with Hungary, Netherlands and Wales. On 10 October 2017, Kosovo made his debut on UEFA European Under-17 Championship qualifications with a 3–1 away defeat in against Netherlands.

UEFA European Championship record												Qualification record					
Era	Year	Round	Pos	Pld	W	D	L	GF	GA	Squad		Pld	W	D	L	GF	GA
U16	(Italy) 1982 to (Czech Republic) 1999	Part of SFR Yugoslavia and FR Yugoslavia										—					
U16	(Israel) 2000 to (England) 2001	Not a UEFA member										Not a UEFA member					
U17	(Denmark) 2002 to (Bulgaria) 2015	Not a UEFA member										Not a UEFA member					
U17	(Azerbaijan) 2016 to (Croatia) 2017	Could not enter										—					
U17	(England) 2018	did not qualify										3	0	0	3	2	8
U17	(Republic of Ireland) 2019	did not qualify										6	2	0	4	3	7
U17	(Estonia) 2020	did not qualify										3	0	1	2	2	7
U17	(Cyprus) 2021	Cancelled due to COVID-19 pandemic										—					
U17	(Israel) 2022	did not qualify										3	2	0	1	2	1
U17	(Hungary) 2023	did not qualify										3	0	1	2	3	11
U17	(Cyprus) 2024	did not qualify										3	1	0	2	3	10
U17	(Albania) 2025	did not qualify									3	0	1	2	7	10	
Total			—	0/38	0	0	0	0	0	0	—	21	5	3	16	22	54

== Players ==
=== Current Squad ===
The following players were called up for the most recent 2026 UEFA European Under-17 Championship qualification matches.

No.	Pos.	Player	Date of birth (age)	Club
	GK	Erlis Shala	4 May 2009 (age 17)	(German Football Association) Ingolstadt
	GK	Ideal Bytyqi	4 May 2009 (age 17)	(Football Federation of Kosovo) Ballkani
	DF	Erblin Pllana	14 September 2009 (age 17)	(German Football Association) Alemannia Aachen
	DF	Unejs Krasniqi	13 February 2009 (age 17)	
	DF	Endri Boshnjaku	6 March 2009 (age 17)	
	DF	Dior Hajdari	17 September 2009 (age 17)	
	DF	Laurin Zhushi	11 October 2009 (age 17)	(German Football Association) Schalke
	DF	Lorent Aliu	14 August 2009 (age 17)	(German Football Association) Hertha Berlin
	MF	Leart Alidemaj	9 October 2009 (age 17)	(Swiss Football Association) Aarau
	MF	David Duzhmani	21 December 2009 (age 16)	(Swiss Football Association) Zürich
	MF	Edion Derguti	27 February 2009 (age 17)	(Swiss Football Association) Lausanne
	MF	Erjon Maksutaj	3 March 2009 (age 17)	(Swiss Football Association) Winterthur
	MF	Bebart Selmani	8 December 2009 (age 16)	(Football Federation of Kosovo) 2 Korriku
	MF	Antik Sefsaliu	15 March 2009 (age 17)	
	MF	Aron Babaj	23 April 2009 (age 17)	(Italian Football Federation) AC Milan
	MF	Nderim Zogaj	27 February 2009 (age 17)	(German Football Association) Bayern Munich
	FW	Endi Krasniqi	21 October 2009 (age 17)	(German Football Association) Hannover
	FW	Leon Mexhani	29 July 2009 (age 17)	(Football Federation of Kosovo) Prishtina
	FW	Rion Ukshini	13 January 2009 (age 17)	(Swiss Football Association) Lausanne
	FW	Unejs Mustafa	15 August 2009 (age 17)	(Football Federation of Kosovo) KF Kurda
	FW	Albion Rexhepaj	28 January 2009 (age 17)	(Football Federation of Kosovo) Trepça

== Coaching staff ==
Position	Name
Head coach	(Kosovo) Arsim Abazi
Assistant coach
Assistant coach	(Kosovo) Fadil Berisha
Assistant coach	(Kosovo) Fatos Vishi
Goalkeeping coach	(Kosovo) Valmir Bytyqi
Physiotherapist	(Kosovo) Gëzim Zogu
Doctor	(Kosovo) Gëzim Murseli

== Head-to-head records against other countries ==
As of 14 April 2021

Opponent	Pld	W	D	L	GF	GA	GD	Win %
Bulgaria	1	0	1	0	0	0	+0	0.00
Cyprus	1	1	0	0	1	0	+1	100.00
Greece	1	0	0	1	0	2	−2	0.00
Hungary	1	0	0	1	1	3	−2	0.00
Netherlands	2	0	1	1	2	4	−2	0.00
Scotland	1	0	0	1	1	2	−1	0.00
Slovenia	1	0	0	1	0	2	−2	0.00
Spain	1	0	0	1	0	1	−1	0.00
Switzerland	1	1	0	0	1	0	+1	100.00
Ukraine	1	0	0	1	0	2	−2	0.00
Wales	2	0	0	2	1	6	−5	0.00
11 Countries	13	2	2	9	7	22	−15	15.38

== See also ==
Men's

- National team
- Under-21
- Under-19
- Under-15
- Futsal

Women's

- National team
- Under-19
- Under-17

== Notes and references ==
=== Notes ===
1. The club listed is the club for which the player last played a competitive match prior to the call-up.
