= Stadio Erasmo Iacovone =

Multi-use stadium in Taranto, Italy

Coordinates: 40°27′10″N 17°16′12″E

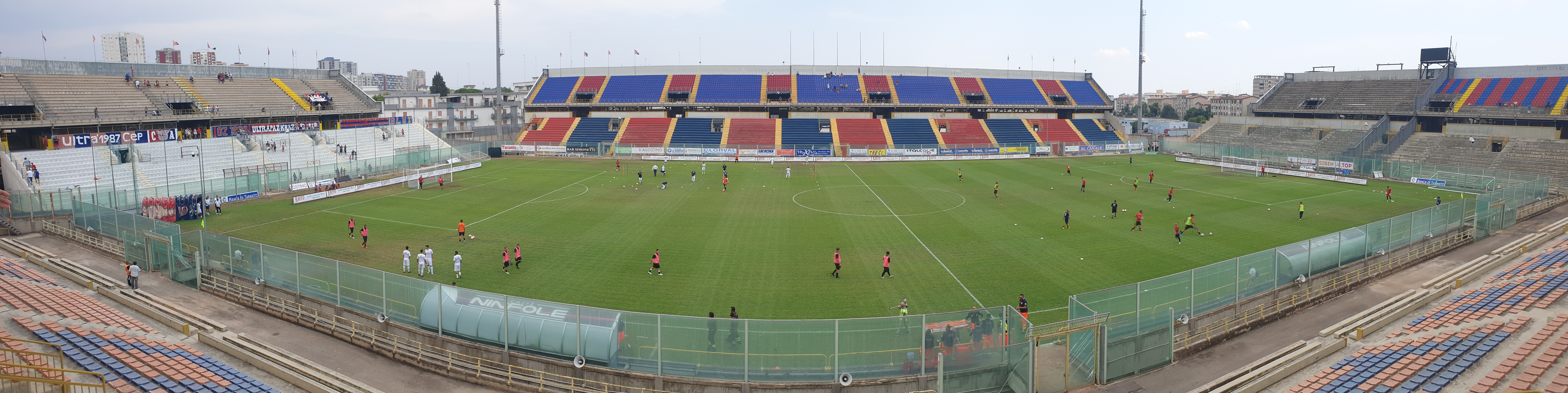
- Stadio Erasmo Iacovone in 2019
- Interactive map of Stadio Erasmo Iacovone
- Former names: Stadio Salinella (1965–1978)
- Location: Taranto, Italy
- Owner: Municipality of Taranto
- Capacity: 20,049
- Surface: Grass

Construction
- Opened: 1965
- Renovated: 1985, 2025–2026

Tenants
- SS Taranto Calcio (1965–present); Italy national football team (selected matches)

Stadio Erasmo Iacovone is a multi-use stadium in Taranto, Italy. It is currently used mostly for football matches and is the home ground of Taranto Sport. The stadium holds 20,049 people.

== History ==
The stadium was founded in 1965 as the Stadio Salinella and was renamed after Erasmo Iacovone, an Italian footballer who died in a car accident at the age of 25 while he was in Taranto, in 1978.

The stadium underwent a major redevelopment ahead of the 2026 Mediterranean Games, with the project costing approximately €62 million. The renovated stadium, designed to comply with UEFA standards, has a capacity of around 20,049 spectators and features modern facilities, new stands, and improved infrastructure.

Preceded by Miloud Hadefi Stadium; Oran	Mediterranean Games; Final Venue; 2026	Succeeded by Kosovo National Stadium; Pristina
