= Stadio Franco Fanuzzi =

Football stadium in Brindisi province, Italy

Coordinates: 40°38′57″N 17°56′17″E

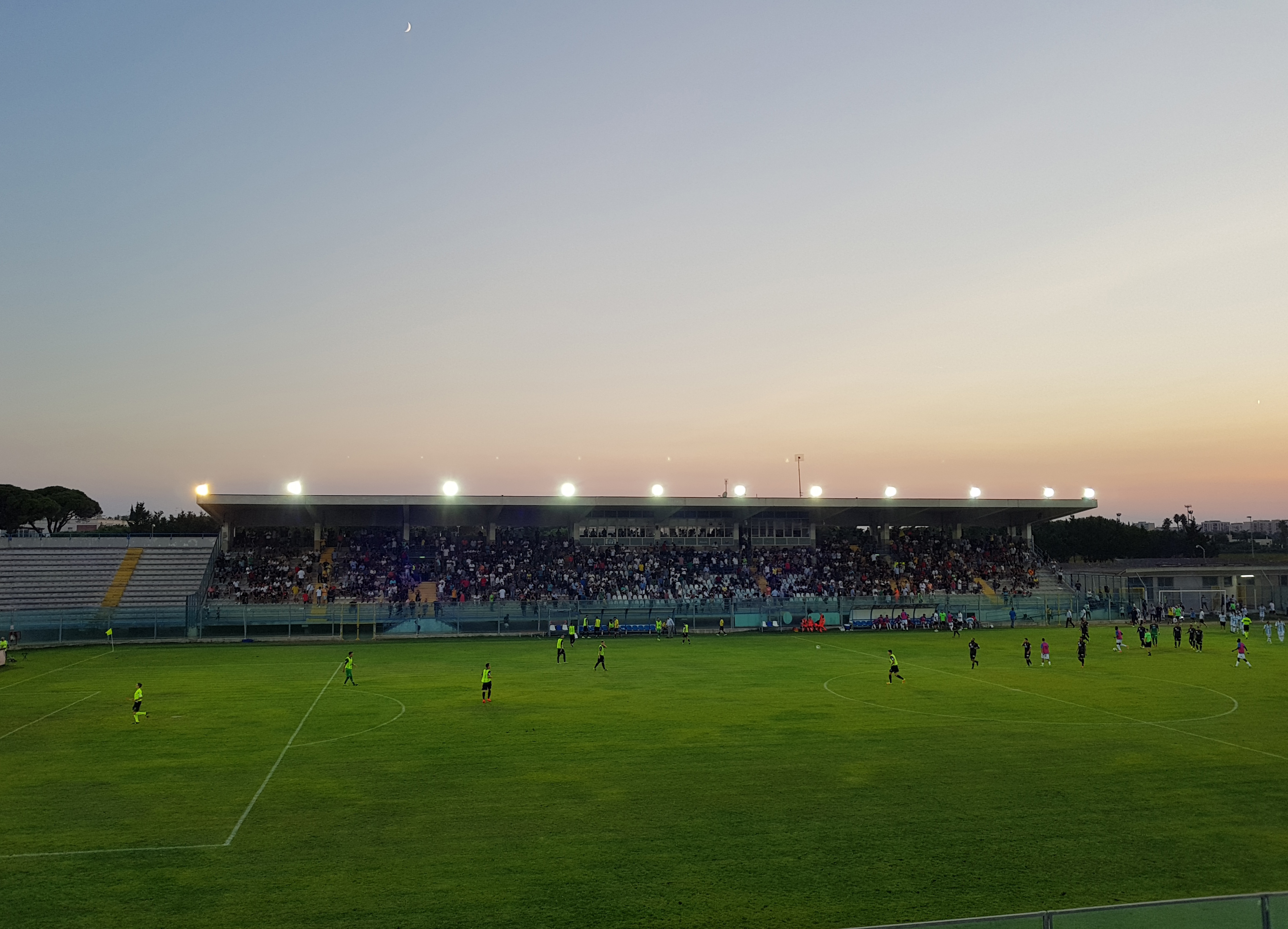
- Interactive map of Stadio Franco Fanuzzi
- Location: Brindisi, Italy
- Capacity: 7,500

Tenants
- Virtus Francavilla; S.S.D. Città di Brindisi

Stadio Franco Fanuzzi is an arena in Brindisi, Italy. It is primarily used for football, and hosts Virtus Francavilla and S.S.D. Città di Brindisi. The stadium holds 7,500 spectators.
