= Kosovo national under-21 football team =

Kosovo U-21
- Nickname: Dardanët (Dardanians)
- Association: Federata e Futbollit e Kosovës (FFK)
- Confederation: UEFA (Europe)
- Head coach: Hekuran Kryeziu
- Captain: Rotation
- Most caps: Ardit Tahiri; Valon Zumberi (18)
- Top scorer: Leon Frokaj (4)
- Home stadium: Fadil Vokrri Stadium
- FIFA code: KOS
First colours	Second colours	Third colours

First international
- Ghana 2–2 Kosovo (Le Bouveret, Switzerland; 12 June 2013)

Biggest win
- Kosovo 7–0 San Marino (Pristina, Kosovo; 14 October 2025)

Biggest defeat
- Egypt 8–0 Kosovo (Le Bouveret, Switzerland; 15 June 2013)

The Kosovo national under-21 football team (Albanian: Kombëtarja e futbollit të Kosovës nën 21 vjeç; Serbian: Фудбалска репрезентација Косова до 21. године, romanized: Fudbalska reprezentacija Kosova do 21. godine) is the national under-21 football team of Kosovo and is controlled by the Football Federation of Kosovo. The team is considered to be the feeder team for the Kosovo national senior team.

== History ==
=== Permitting by FIFA to play friendlies ===
On 6 February 2013, FIFA gave the permission to play international friendly games against other member associations. Whereas, on 13 January 2014, there was a change of this permit that forbade Kosovo to play against the national teams of the countries of the former Yugoslavia. Club teams were also allowed to play friendlies and this happened after a FIFA Emergency Committee meeting. However, it was stipulated that clubs and representative teams of the Football Federation of Kosovo may not display national symbols as flags, emblems, etc. or play national anthems. The go-ahead was given after meetings between the Football Association of Serbia and Sepp Blatter.

=== Membership in UEFA and FIFA ===
In September 2015 at an UEFA Executive Committee meeting in Malta was approved the request from the federation to the admission in UEFA to the next Ordinary Congress to be held in Budapest. On 3 May 2016, at the Ordinary Congress. Kosovo were accepted into UEFA after members voted 28–24 in favor of Kosovo. Ten days later, Kosovo was accepted in FIFA during their 66th congress in Mexico with 141 votes in favour and 23 against.

=== UEFA European Championship qualifications ===
==== 2019 qualifications ====
On 26 January 2017, in Nyon, it was decided that Kosovo should be part in Group 5 of the 2019 UEFA European Under-21 Championship qualification, together with Azerbaijan, Germany, Israel, Norway and Republic of Ireland. On 25 March 2017, Kosovo made his debut on UEFA European Under-21 Championship qualifications with a 1–0 away defeat in against Republic of Ireland. On 29 July 2017, UEFA confirmed that the match in which Kosovo had lost with a deep score 0–5 against Norway was given as a 3–0 victory for Kosovo, this happened after in that match for Norway had played Kristoffer Ajer who was suspended. This match for Kosovo was the first victory in a qualifying match for a major tournament. Kosovo would secure another dramatic win against Norway at home with 3–2 by two goals from Enis Bytyqi and one from Florent Hasani, that was Kosovo's first home win in their history at this competition.

==== 2021 qualifications ====
On 11 December 2018, in Nyon, it was decided that Kosovo should be part in Group 3 of the 2021 UEFA European Under-21 Championship qualification, together with Albania, Andorra, Austria, England and Turkey. Before the start of this qualifying cycle, Kosovo in March 2019 played two friendly matches in Antalya with Turkmenistan which won with a narrow score of 3–2, and with Malta which won with a minimum score of 1–0, in the composition of Kosovo was the players who would potentially be part of the national team during the qualifying cycle. On 6 June 2019, Kosovo started the qualifying cycle against Andorra which they defeated with a deep score 4–0 and this match is their best result yet. Kosovo would follow this great result after beating Turkey at home with 3-1 showing a great display. Also leading the qualifying table, for the first time in their history. Success wouldn't follow as Kosovo than lost a string of five matches in the process in which they only scored two goals. Against Albania losing away with 2-1 in Elbasan. Kosovo would secure their third win against Andorra at home with a close 1-0 win. Their last match ended in a devastating loss against Turkey in Istanbul with 3-0 their seventh loss in total. Kosovo finished their Qualifying in 5th place with nine points, only above Andorra, but trailing behind Turkey, Albania, Austria and Group winners England.

== Team image ==
=== Nicknames ===
The Kosovo national football team has been known by the nickname "Dardanët" ("Dardanians"). Prior to 2016, the team was also sometimes referred to as "Shqipëria B" ("Albania B") due to the exchange of players between the national teams of Kosovo and Albania, which led to informal references to both teams as reserve (B) sides of one another. Kosovo received this nickname because several players joined the team after limited opportunities with Albania, while the Albania national team was occasionally described as "Kosovo B" because of the significant presence of players of Kosovo Albanian descent in its squad.

=== Kits and crest ===
The Kosovo national team kits were mostly red and black before the declaration of independence, with occasional variations over the years. After independence, the kits have primarily been blue and yellow. On 5 October 2016, Kosovo signed a four-year contract with the Spanish sportswear company Kelme, becoming the first official kit supplier of Kosovo following the country's membership in UEFA and FIFA. On 5 February 2026, Kosovo signed a two-year contract with the German sportswear company Adidas, making it the national team's current kit supplier.

==== Kit sponsorship ====
Kit supplier	Period	Contract	
Kit supplier	Period	Announcement	Duration
Kelme	2016–2018	5 October 2016	2016–2020 (4 years)
Fourteen	2018–2022	16 June 2018	2018–2022 (4 years)
Erreà	2023–2026	23 February 2023	2023–2026 (3 years)
Adidas	2026–present	5 February 2026	2026–2028 (2 years)

== Fixtures and results ==
=== 2025 ===
14 November UEFA Euro 2027 qualification	Cyprus	0–4	Kosovo	Dasaki Achnas, Cyprus
18:00		Report	Bujupi 16', 61'; Frokaj 45+4' (pen.); Shala 90+1'	Stadium: Dasaki Stadium; Referee: Mateo Erceg (Croatia)

18 November UEFA Euro 2027 qualification	Finland	0–0	Kosovo	Turku, Finland
17:30		Report		Stadium: Kupittaa Stadium; Referee: David Šmajc (Slovenia)

=== 2026 ===
27 March UEFA Euro 2027 qualification	Kosovo	0–1	Romania	Pristina, Kosovo
19:00		Report	Vermeșan 66'	Stadium: Fadil Vokrri Stadium; Attendance: 350; Referee: Iwan Griffith (Wales)

31 March UEFA Euro 2027 qualification	Spain	2–0	Kosovo	Alcalá de Henares, Spain
19:00	G. García 71'; P. García 90+4'	Report		Stadium: Centro Deportivo Wanda Alcalá de Henares; Attendance: 2,318; Referee: Joakim Östling (Sweden)

3 June Friendly	Turkey	1–0	Kosovo	Ümraniye, Turkey
19:00	Malkoçoğlu 82'	Report		Stadium: Ümraniye Municipality City Stadium; Referee: Melih Aldemir (Turkey)

6 June Friendly	Kosovo	0–0	Luxembourg	Hajvalia, Kosovo
16:00				Stadium: FFK National Educational Camp; Referee: Mervan Bejtullahu (Kosovo)

22 August 2026 Mediterranean Games	Algeria	2–1	Kosovo	Francavilla Fontana, Italy
10:30	Kohili 33'; Tarzout 90+1'	Report	Grezda 76'	Stadium: Stadio Giovanni Paolo II; Referee: Bassem Belaid (Tunisia)

24 August 2026 Mediterranean Games	Albania	3–1	Kosovo	Lecce, Italy
21:00	Bode 51'; Daja 74'; Leshi 90+2'	Report	Mehmeti 90+4'	Stadium: Stadio Via del mare Referee: Matteo Marchetti (Italy)

26 August 2026 Mediterranean Games	Kosovo	0–3	Italy	Taranto, Italy
21:00		Report	Giammattei 30'; Casagrande 75' (pen.); Perillo 90+8'	Stadium: Stadio Erasmo Iacovone; Referee: Ozan Ergün (Turkey)

24 September UEFA Euro 2027 qualification	San Marino	0–3	Kosovo	Serravalle, San Marino
20:30		Report	Ademi 28', 59'; Xhylani 62'	Stadium: San Marino Stadium; Referee: David Fuxman (Israel)

30 September UEFA Euro 2027 qualification	Kosovo	2–1	Cyprus	Pristina, Kosovo
19:00	Berisha 69' (pen.); Jashari 76'	Report	Kontopoulos 52'	Stadium: Fadil Vokrri Stadium; Attendance: 980; Referee: Robin Hensgens (Netherlands)

6 October UEFA Euro 2027 qualification	Kosovo	4–4	Finland	Pristina, Kosovo
19:00	Gashi 15', 57'; Shala 38'; Ademi 84'	Report	Lötjönen 34'; Söderbäck 48'; Seji 74' (o.g.); Helén 90'	Stadium: Fadil Vokrri Stadium; Attendance: 530; Referee: Lukasz Kuzma (Poland)

16 November Friendly	Kosovo	0–2	Luxembourg	Pristina, Kosovo
16:00		Report	Kirsch 6'; Hoxha 65'	Stadium: Fadil Vokrri Stadium; Referee: Visar Kastrati (Kosovo)

== Players ==
=== Current squad ===
- The following players were called up for the friendly match against Luxembourg, on 16 November 2026.
- Caps and goals are correct as of 16 November 2026, (Note: There may be more matches or goals, as some data is missing, mainly from friendly matches.) after the match against Luxembourg, only matches with FIFA members are included.
- Players in **bold** have been called up or have played at least one full international match with national senior team.

No.	Pos.	Player	Date of birth (age)	Caps	Goals	Club
1	GK	Lindsay Gutaj	15 February 2007 (age 19)	4	0	(German Football Association) 1. FC Nürnberg II
16	GK	Amar Emini	22 July 2006 (age 20)	1	0	(Football Federation of Kosovo) Trepça '89
2	DF	Teo Jashari	2 August 2007 (age 19)	1	0	(Swiss Football Association) Lausanne-Sport II
3	DF	Leon Parduzi	10 December 2006 (age 19)	14	0	(German Football Association) Holstein Kiel
4	DF	**Luan Lleshi**	14 January 2006 (age 20)	5	0	(Albanian Football Federation) Skënderbeu
5	DF	Indrit Mavraj	23 January 2006 (age 20)	4	0	(Polish Football Association) Lechia Gdańsk
13	DF	Gentrit Jaha	8 September 2006 (age 20)	1	0	(Football Federation of Kosovo) Llapi
14	DF	Leart Salihu	14 February 2007 (age 19)	4	0	(Swiss Football Association) Servette U21
20	DF	Endrit Hasanmetaj	28 January 2007 (age 19)	1	0	(Swiss Football Association) St. Gallen U21
6	MF	Florent Hajdini	2 September 2006 (age 20)	1	0	(Austrian Football Association) SKU Amstetten
7	MF	**Elvir Gashijan**	5 August 2006 (age 20)	8	0	(Turkish Football Federation) Bodrum
8	MF	Demir Xhemalija	7 June 2006 (age 20)	1	0	(Swiss Football Association) Luzern
19	MF	Eronis Haxhiu	9 September 2007 (age 19)	1	0	(Swiss Football Association) Servette U21
21	MF	Aurel Limani	14 April 2006 (age 20)	1	0	(Football Federation of Kosovo) Drenica
9	FW	**Eliot Bujupi**	3 July 2006 (age 20)	6	3	(German Football Association) VfB Stuttgart II
11	FW	Medin Gashi	1 February 2006 (age 20)	6	3	(Croatian Football Federation) Gorica
15	FW	Xhan Aliu	7 May 2006 (age 20)	2	0	(Swiss Football Association) Wil
17	FW	Leandro Maksutaj	18 June 2007 (age 19)	1	0	(Swiss Football Association) Kriens
18	FW	Amar Demolli	16 July 2006 (age 20)	1	0	(Football Federation of Kosovo) Drenica

=== Recent call-ups ===
The following players have been called up for the team within the last 12 months and are still available for selection.

Pos.	Player	Date of birth (age)	Caps	Goals	Club	Latest call-up
GK	Eron Avdullahu	17 February 2007 (age 19)	0	0	(Switzerland) Grasshoppers U21	v. Luxembourg, 16 November 2026^{PRE}
GK	Laurent Seji	22 May 2004 (age 22)	12	0	(Switzerland) Stade Lausanne Ouchy	v. Finland, 6 October 2026
GK	**Altin Gjokaj**	11 November 2005 (age 21)	5	0	(Kosovo) Prishtina	v. Finland, 6 October 2026
GK	Miran Qela	13 December 2006 (age 19)	2	0	(Kosovo) Llapi	2026 Mediterranean Games
GK	Art Miftari	10 January 2005 (age 21)	1	0	(Kosovo) Ramiz Sadiku	v. Spain, 31 March 2026
DF	Lendrit Shala	4 May 2004 (age 22)	17	2	(Kosovo) Ballkani	v. Finland, 6 October 2026
DF	Ledjan Sahitaj	12 January 2004 (age 22)	11	0	(Switzerland) Winterthur	v. Finland, 6 October 2026
DF	Fuad Ajvazi	24 August 2004 (age 22)	2	0	(Kosovo) Llapi	v. Finland, 6 October 2026
DF	Andi Veliqi	7 January 2005 (age 21)	2	0	(Kosovo) Drenica	v. Finland, 6 October 2026
DF	Donart Syla	5 August 2006 (age 20)	3	0	(Kosovo) Liria Prizren	2026 Mediterranean Games
DF	Dejvid Kabashi	6 August 2006 (age 20)	2	0	Unattached	2026 Mediterranean Games
DF	Gentrit Hetemaj	23 February 2007 (age 19)	2	0	(Kosovo) Llapi	2026 Mediterranean Games
DF	Floni Selimi	15 April 2007 (age 19)	2	0	(Germany) Bremer SV	2026 Mediterranean Games
DF	**Leon Zeqiraj**	2 July 2005 (age 21)	7	0	(Croatia) Kustošija	v. Luxembourg, 6 June 2026
MF	**Faton Ademi**	19 May 2006 (age 20)	11	3	(Germany) Greuther Fürth	v. Luxembourg, 16 November 2026^{WD}
MF	Engjëll Krasniqi	21 March 2007 (age 19)	3	0	(Netherlands) NEC U21	v. Luxembourg, 16 November 2026^{PRE}
MF	Lirim Jashari	21 April 2006 (age 20)	12	2	(Germany) VfL Bochum II	v. Finland, 6 October 2026
MF	**Arjanit Fazlija**	5 February 2005 (age 21)	12	1	(Kosovo) Prishtina	v. Finland, 6 October 2026
MF	**Laurent Xhylani**	23 September 2004 (age 22)	11	1	(Kosovo) Malisheva	v. Finland, 6 October 2026
MF	Dren Zeqiri	5 May 2004 (age 22)	9	0	(Kosovo) Prishtina	v. Finland, 6 October 2026
MF	Arianit Hasani	24 February 2004 (age 22)	7	1	(Kosovo) Llapi	v. Finland, 6 October 2026
MF	Arjol Bllaca	20 February 2005 (age 21)	6	0	(Kosovo) Gjilani	v. Finland, 6 October 2026
MF	Dardan Morina	14 October 2005 (age 21)	5	0	(Croatia) Lokomotiva	v. Finland, 6 October 2026
MF	Blerton Isufi	14 February 2006 (age 20)	2	0	(Norway) HamKam	v. Finland, 6 October 2026
MF	Adem Imeri	13 February 2006 (age 20)	8	0	Unattached	2026 Mediterranean Games
MF	Elvaris Suplja	28 February 2006 (age 20)	4	0	(Italy) Francavilla	2026 Mediterranean Games
MF	Diart Gashi	3 February 2008 (age 18)	4	0	(Germany) Hertha BSC U19	2026 Mediterranean Games
MF	Omer Shala	4 September 2008 (age 18)	3	0	(Kosovo) 2 Korriku	2026 Mediterranean Games
MF	Rrezon Gashi	11 February 2006 (age 20)	0	0	(Kosovo) Vushtrria	2026 Mediterranean Games
MF	Elion Jashari	9 August 2005 (age 21)	4	0	Unattached	v. Luxembourg, 6 June 2026
MF	Denis Kryeziu	19 September 2006 (age 20)	2	0	(Germany) Waldhof Mannheim	v. Luxembourg, 6 June 2026
MF	Albert Rrahmani	11 March 2007 (age 19)	2	0	(Denmark) Nykøbing	v. Luxembourg, 6 June 2026
MF	Dior Gërbovci	22 February 2006 (age 20)	0	0	(Kosovo) Gjilani	v. Turkey, 3 June 2026^{PRE}
MF	**Leon Frokaj**	23 April 2005 (age 21)	13	4	(Switzerland) St. Gallen	v. Spain, 31 March 2026^{A}
FW	Igball Jashari	14 July 2005 (age 21)	16	0	(Kosovo) Drita	v. Finland, 6 October 2026
FW	**Hekuran Berisha**	3 October 2005 (age 21)	15	3	(Albania) Dinamo City	v. Finland, 6 October 2026
FW	Erion Sadriu	14 August 2004 (age 22)	13	0	(Kosovo) Ferizaj	v. Finland, 6 October 2026
FW	Lorik Mehmeti	5 June 2008 (age 18)	4	1	(Kosovo) Prishtina	2026 Mediterranean Games
FW	Oniks Grezda	27 August 2007 (age 19)	3	1	(Kosovo) Drita	2026 Mediterranean Games
FW	Edor Hajdini	1 February 2007 (age 19)	3	0	(Finland) Inter Turku II	2026 Mediterranean Games
FW	Rin Ahmeti	9 August 2008 (age 18)	3	0	(Kosovo) Prishtina	2026 Mediterranean Games
FW	Adam Hasani	5 September 2008 (age 18)	1	0	(Italy) Grosseto	2026 Mediterranean Games
FW	Meris Maliqi	26 September 2005 (age 21)	1	0	(Kosovo) Dukagjini	v. Luxembourg, 6 June 2026
Notes: ^{INJ} = The player is not part of the current squad due to injury.; ^{PRE} = Preliminary squad/standby.; ^{A} = Was called up from national senior squad.

== Competitive record ==
=== UEFA European Championship ===
On 26 January 2017, in Nyon, it was decided that Kosovo should be part in Group 5 of the 2019 UEFA European Under-21 Championship qualification, together with Azerbaijan, Germany, Israel, Norway and Republic of Ireland. On 25 March 2017, Kosovo made his debut on UEFA European Under-21 Championship qualifications with a 1–0 away defeat in against Republic of Ireland.

UEFA European Under-21 Championship record										Qualification record						
Year	Round	Pos	Pld	W	D	L	GF	GA	Squad	Pos	Pld	W	D	L	GF	GA
1978 to 1992	Part of SFR Yugoslavia									Part of SFR Yugoslavia						
(France) 1994 to (Romania) 1998	Part of FR Yugoslavia									Part of FR Yugoslavia						
(Slovakia) 2000 to (Netherlands) 2007	Not a FIFA member, under UNMIK									Not a FIFA member						
(Sweden) 2009 to (Czech Republic) 2015	Not a UEFA member									Not a FIFA member						
(Poland) 2017	Could not enter									Not a FIFA member						
(Italy) (San Marino) 2019	Did not qualify									5th	10	3	3	4	9	12
(Hungary) (Slovenia) 2021	Did not qualify									5th	10	3	0	7	9	20
(Romania) (Georgia (country)) 2023	Did not qualify									4th	10	3	3	4	8	13
(Slovakia) 2025	Did not qualify									4th	10	3	3	4	10	17
(Albania) (Serbia) 2027	Did not qualify									4th	9	4	3	3	21	11
Total	—	0/26	0	0	0	0	0	0	—	5/18	50	16	12	22	57	73

=== Other tournaments ===
Kosovo U21 has so far participated in two firstly in the international tournament in Valais Youth Cup, a two-day international football tournament. In which they finished in fourth place. Their first match was against Ghana in which they lost.

Year	Round	Pos	Pld	W	D	L	GF	GA	Squad
(Switzerland) 2013 Valais Youth Cup	Fourth place	4th	2	0	1	1	2	10	Squad
(Italy) 2026 Mediterranean Games	Group stage	4th	3	0	0	3	2	8	Squad
Total	—	2/2	5	0	1	4	4	18	—

== See also ==
Men's

- National team
- Under-19
- Under-17
- Under-15
- Futsal

Women's

- National team
- Under-19
- Under-17
