= List of foreign Liga I players =

This is a list of foreign players in the Liga I, which commenced play in 1909. The following players must meet both of the following two criteria:

1. Have played at least one Liga I game. Players who were signed by Liga I clubs, but only played in lower league, cup and/or European games, or did not play in any competitive games at all, are not included.
2. Are considered foreign, i.e., outside Romania determined by the following:

A player is considered foreign if he is not eligible to play for the national teams of Romania.

More specifically,

- If a player has been capped on international level, the national team is used; if he has been capped by more than one country, the highest level (or the most recent) team is used. These include Romanian players with dual citizenship. Players who played for Romania but came as foreign players (such as István Avar) are also listed.
- If a player has not been capped on international level, his country of birth is used, except those who were born abroad from Romanian parents or moved to Romania at a young age, and those who clearly indicated to have switched their nationality to another nation.

Clubs listed are those that the player has played at least one Liga I game for.

Seasons listed are those that the player has played at least one Liga I game in. Note that seasons, not calendar years, are used. For example, "1992–1995" indicates that the player has played in every season from 1992–1993 to 1994–1995, but not necessarily every calendar year from 1992 to 1995.

In bold: players that have played at least one Liga I game in the current season (2026–27) and the clubs they've played for. They include players that have subsequently left the club, but do not include current players of a Liga I club that have not played a Liga I game in the current season.

== Albania ==
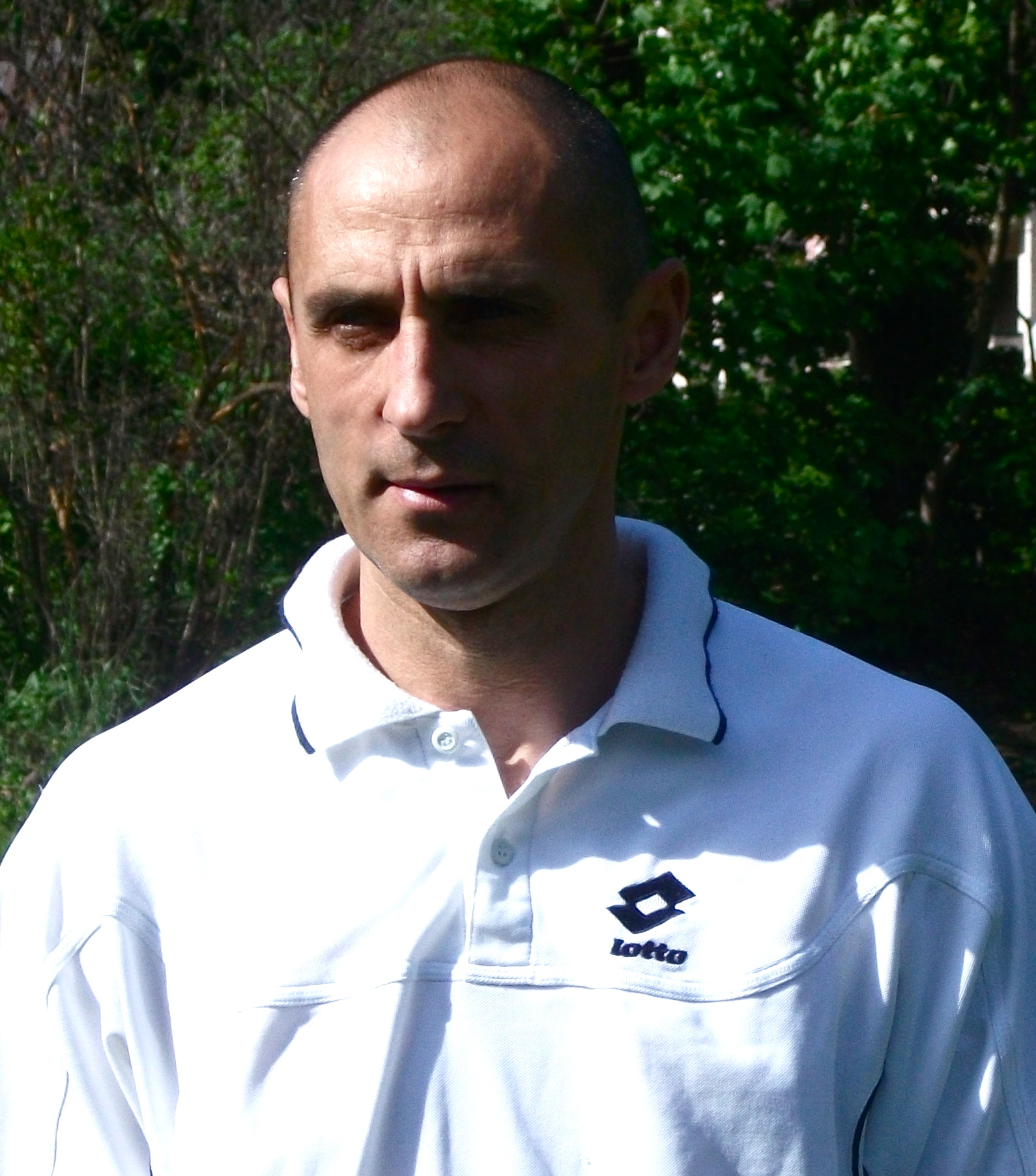
Roland Agalliu was the first foreign footballer who arrived in Romania after the 1989 Romanian Revolution.

- Donaldo Açka – Politehnica Iași – 2020–2021
- Roland Agalliu – FC Universitatea Craiova, Oțelul Galați – 1990–1993
- Arlind Ajeti – CFR Cluj – 2023–2025
- Alket Alcani – Gloria Bistrița – 2003–2004
- Naser Aliji – Dinamo București, FC Voluntari – 2018–2019, 2022–2024
- Elis Bakaj – Dinamo București – 2010–2012
- Taulant Baki – Petrolul Ploiești – 1999–2000
- Idriz Batha – UTA Arad – 2021–2023
- Amir Bilali – Academica Clinceni – 2020–2022
- Ilir Bozhiqi – FC Brașov – 1991–1995
- Agim Canaj – FC Brașov – 1991–1994
- Elton Ceno – Steaua București – 1998–2000
- Endri Çelaj – Metaloglobus București – 2025–2026
- Sulejman Demollari – Dinamo București – 1991–1995
- Dashnor Dume – Oțelul Galați – 1993–1994
- Albert Duro – Steaua București, Naţional București – 1998–2001, 2002–2004
- Realdo Fili – FC Botoșani – 2019–2022
- Sandër Leon Grunasi – Politehnica Timișoara – 1995–1996
- Edon Hasani – Ceahlăul Piatra Neamț, ACS Poli Timișoara – 2013–2014
- Erion Hoxhallari – UTA Arad – 2022–2023
- Elvis Kabashi – Dinamo București – 2018–2019
- Sherif Kallaku – Sepsi Sfântu Gheorghe – 2023–2025
- Florian Kamberi – Politehnica Iași – 2024–2025
- Arben Kokala – Oțelul Galați – 1991–1993
- Blerim Krasniqi – CS Mioveni – 2022–2023
- Alket Kruja – Gloria Bistrița – 2003–2004
- Fabian Lokaj – Gaz Metan Mediaș – 2017–2018
- Azdren Llullaku – Gaz Metan Mediaș, CSMS Iași, Astra Giurgiu – 2012–2017, 2018–2019
- Herald Marku – UTA Arad – 2023–2024
- Altin Masati – Oțelul Galați, FC Onești – 1993–1994, 1998–2000
- Arben Minga – FC Brașov, Dacia Unirea Brăila – 1991–1993
- Perlat Musta – Dinamo București – 1991–1994
- Mërgim Neziri – FC Botoșani – 2015–2016
- **Enriko Papa** – **FC Botoșani**, Sepsi Sfântu Gheorghe – 2018–2023, 2024–
- Leonard Perloshi – Petrolul Ploiești – 1999–2000
- Kamer Qaka – Politehnica Iași, Steaua București, CS Universitatea Craiova – 2017–2020
- Simon Rrumbullaku – UTA Arad, Chindia Târgoviște – 2020–2022
- Xhuliano Skuka – Politehnica Iași – 2024–2025
- Kristi Vangjeli – Astra Giurgiu – 2016–2017
- Edmond Voda – Oțelul Galați – 1993–1994

== Algeria ==
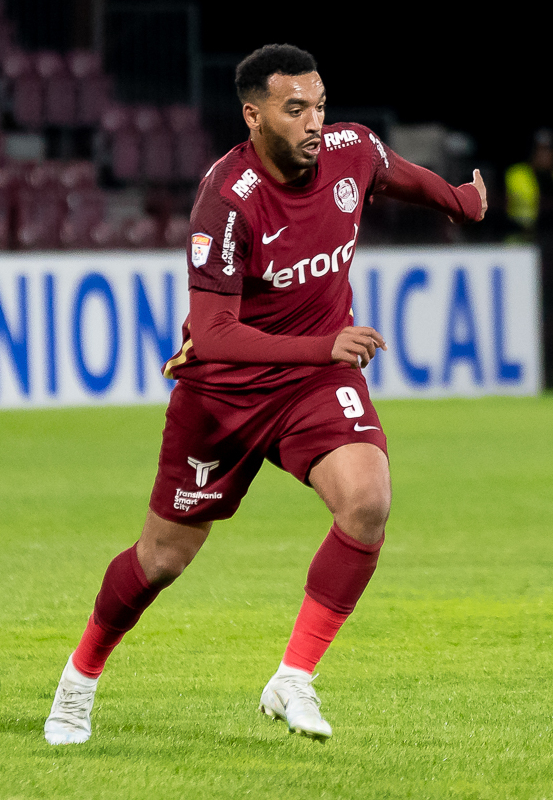
French-Algerian Billel Omrani won five consecutive Liga I titles with CFR Cluj, and was named the Liga I Foreign Player of the Year in 2019.

- Rachid Aït-Atmane – Dinamo București – 2018–2019
- Najib Ammari – CFR Cluj, Dunărea Călărași, Viitorul Constanța – 2013–2014, 2018–2020
- Rachid Bouhenna – Sepsi Sfântu Gheorghe, CFR Cluj, FCSB, Politehnica Iași – 2019–2024
- Aymen Boutoutaou – FCSB – 2026–
- Liassine Cadamuro – Concordia Chiajna – 2018–2019
- Jugurtha Hamroun – Oțelul Galați, Steaua București – 2014–2017
- Billel Omrani – CFR Cluj, FCSB, Petrolul Ploiești, Politehnica Iași – 2016–2025, 2026–
- Aymen Tahar – Gaz Metan Mediaș, Steaua București – 2011–2017
- Mourad Satli – Petrolul Ploiești, FC Voluntari – 2014–2015, 2020–2021
- Islam Slimani – CFR Cluj – 2025–2026
- Karim Ziani – Petrolul Ploiești – 2015–2016

== Angola ==
- Aguinaldo – Politehnica Iași – 2018–2019
- Alexander Christovão – Dinamo București – 2018–2019
- Dédé – Politehnica Timișoara – 2009–2010
- Carlos Fernandes – Steaua București – 2005–2007
- Aldaír Ferreira – FC Botoșani – 2023–2026
- Dominique Kivuvu – CFR Cluj – 2010–2012
- Luís Lourenço – Corona Brașov – 2013–2014
- Bruno Paz – Oțelul Galați – 2025–2026
- Zé Kalanga – Dinamo București – 2006–2007, 2008–2010

== Argentina ==
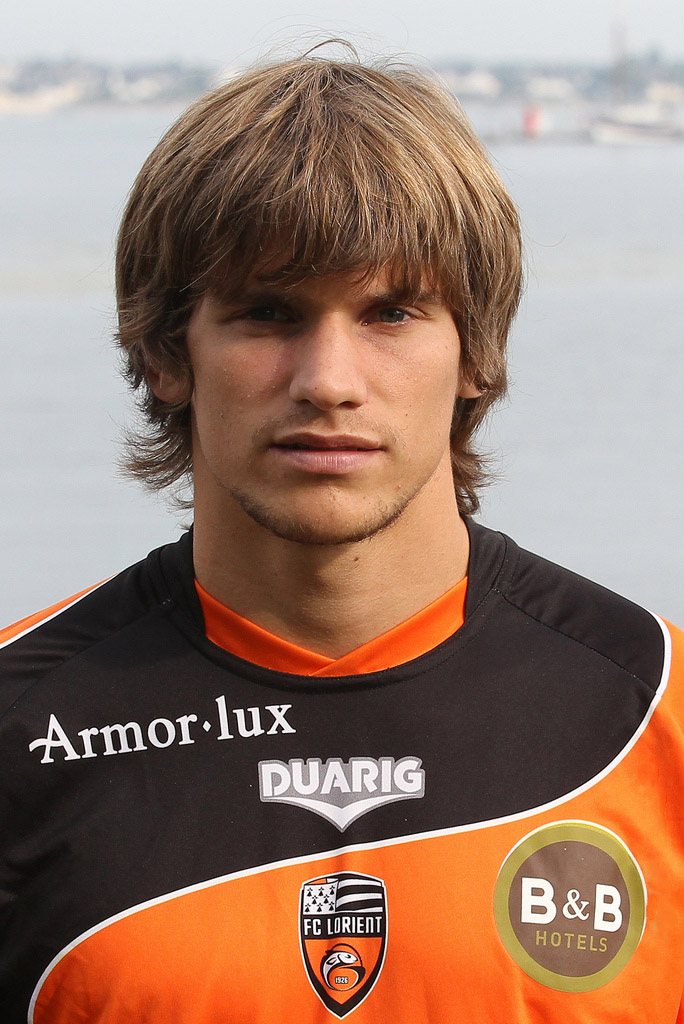
Sebastián Dubarbier won two Liga I titles with CFR Cluj and was the first winner of the Liga I Foreign Player of the Year award.

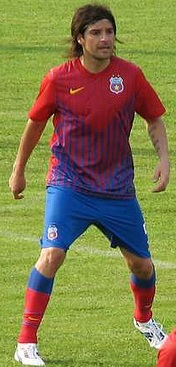
Pablo Brandán won the Liga I title with Unirea Urziceni and Viitorul Constanța, and was named the Liga I Foreign Player of the Year in 2009.

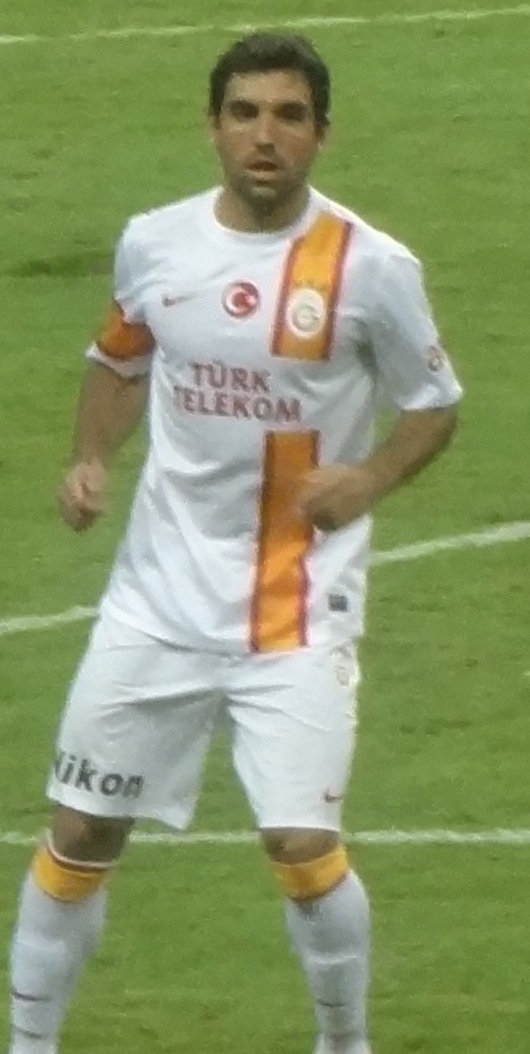
Emmanuel Culio won six Liga I titles with CFR Cluj.

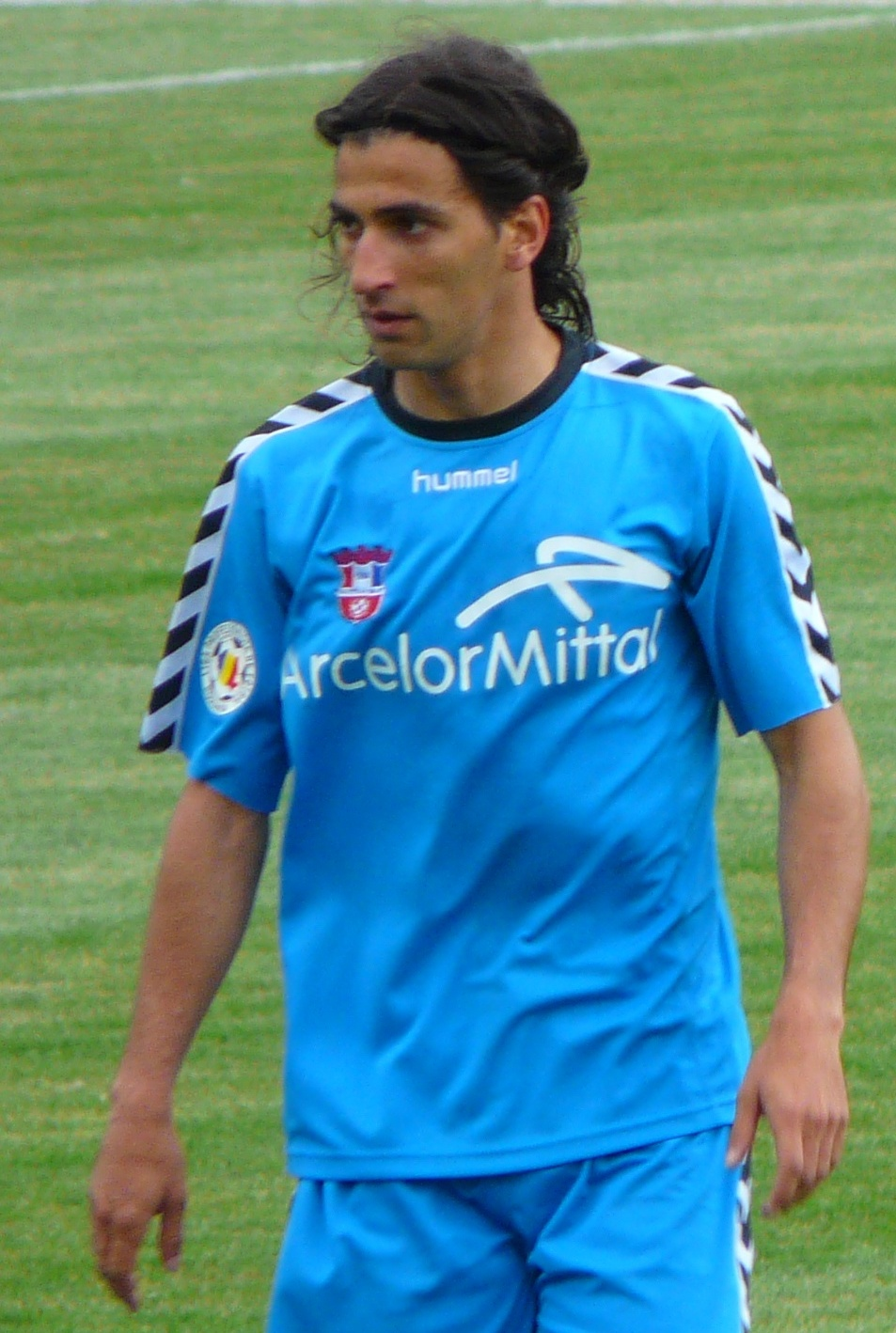
Gabriel Viglianti won the Liga I title with Oțelul Galați.

- Matías Abelairas – FC Vaslui – 2013–2014
- Federico Anselmo – Universitatea Cluj – 2023–2024
- Juan Bauza – FC U Craiova – 2021–2024
- Elías Bazzi – Național București, Argeș Pitești, Dinamo București, Universitatea Cluj – 2004–2007, 2008–2009, 2010–2012
- Mariano Bettini – Csíkszereda – 2025–2026
- Marco Borgnino – Farul Constanța – 2023–2024
- Pablo Brandán – Unirea Urziceni, Steaua București, CS Universitatea Craiova, ASA Târgu Mureș, Viitorul Constanța – 2007–2012, 2014–2017
- Enzo Bruno – Unirea Alba Iulia – 2009–2010
- Gonzalo Cabrera – FC Botoșani – 2015–2016
- Fernando Cafasso – Gloria Bistrița – 2010–2011, 2012–2013
- Danilo Carando – Astra Ploiești – 2009–2010
- Juan Cascini – FC Botoșani, Academica Clinceni, UTA Arad, FC Voluntari – 2019–2024
- Lucas Chacana – Politehnica Iași – 2019–2021
- Nicolás Chiesa – Politehnica Iași – 2004–2005
- Esteban Ciaccheri – FC Botoșani – 2017–2018
- Gabriel Compagnucci – FC U Craiova – 2023–2024
- Ramiro Costa – ASA Târgu Mureș – 2015–2016
- Tomás Costa – CFR Cluj – 2010–2011
- Walter Cubilla – Gloria Bistrița – 2012–2013
- Emmanuel Culio – CFR Cluj – 2007–2011, 2017–2020, 2021–2022
- Gastón Díaz – Ceahlăul Piatra Neamț – 2006–2007
- Tomás Díaz – Sepsi Sfântu Gheorghe, Chindia Târgoviște – 2019–2021
- David Distéfano – FC Brașov, Astra Giurgiu, Pandurii Târgu Jiu – 2010–2014
- Jonathan Domínguez – FC Brașov – 2011–2012
- Sebastián Dubarbier – CFR Cluj – 2007–2010
- Cristian Fabbiani – CFR Cluj – 2007–2009
- Mariano Fernandez – Dinamo București – 2007–2008
- Ezequiel Filipetto – Pandurii Târgu Jiu – 2015–2016
- Paolo Frangipane – CFR Cluj – 2008–2009
- Pablo Gaitán – Politehnica Iași, Oțelul Galați – 2020–2021, 2023–2024
- Juan Pablo Garat – Dinamo București – 2010–2011
- Cristian García – Concordia Chiajna – 2015–2016
- José Luis García – Politehnica Timișoara, Gloria Buzău – 2008–2009
- Lucas García – Ceahlăul Piatra Neamț – 2011–2015
- Alejandro Gavatorta – Politehnica Iași – 2004–2007, 2008–2009
- Ángel Gillard – Corvinul Hunedoara – 2026–
- Maximiliano Giusti – Pandurii Târgu Jiu – 2013–2014
- Nicolás Gorobsov – ACS Poli Timișoara, ASA Târgu Mureș, Concordia Chiajna, FC Voluntari – 2013–2017, 2018–2020
- Manuel de Iriondo – Politehnica Iași – 2019–2021
- Juan Kaprof – FC Botoșani – 2023–2025
- Alejandro Kruchowski – Astra Ploiești – 2009–2010
- Enzo López – FC Botoșani – 2023–2026
- Julián Marchioni – Politehnica Iași – 2023–2025
- Elvio Martínez – Politehnica Timișoara – 2007–2008
- Lucas Masoero – Universitatea Cluj – 2023–2025
- Patricio Matricardi – FC Hermannstadt, Gaz Metan Mediaș, FC Voluntari, FC Botoșani – 2020–2025
- Osvaldo Miranda – Dinamo București, Astra Ploiești – 2007–2012
- Franco Mussis – FC Botoșani – 2022–2023
- Gustavo Oberman – CFR Cluj – 2008–2009
- Maximiliano Oliva – Dinamo București, ACS Poli Timișoara – 2016–2018
- Gustavo Paruolo – Politehnica Iași – 2006–2009
- Cristian Paz – FC Voluntari – 2022–2024
- Juan Pablo Passaglia – Politehnica Iași, UTA Arad, Chindia Târgoviște – 2019–2023
- Sixto Peralta – CFR Cluj – 2007–2012
- Matías Pérez – Rapid București – 2021–2022
- Leonel Pierce – FC Botoșani – 2019–2020
- Sebastián Pol – CS Mioveni – 2007–2008
- Cristian Sánchez Prette – CFR Cluj – 2008–2009
- Franco Razzotti – FC Vaslui – 2013–2014
- David Reano – Gloria Bistrița – 2012–2013
- Facundo Rizzi – Argeș Pitești – 2022–2023
- Jonathan Rodríguez – FC Botoșani, CFR Cluj, Dinamo București, Sepsi Sfântu Gheorghe – 2017–2024
- Chapi Romano – FC Botoșani – 2024–2025
- Diego Ruiz – CFR Cluj, FCM Târgu Mureș – 2007–2012
- Martin Šarić – Politehnica Iași – 2005–2007
- Diego Sevillano – Oțelul Galați – 2013–2014
- Juan Sánchez Sotelo – Rapid București – 2011–2012
- Abel Valdez – Astra Ploiești – 2009–2010
- Lucho Vega – Petrolul Ploiești – 2026–
- Julián Velázquez – Gaz Metan Mediaș – 2014–2015
- Luciano Vella – Rapid București – 2008–2009
- Gabriel Viglianti – Oțelul Galați – 2007–2013
- Agustín Vuletich – UTA Arad – 2024–2025

== Armenia ==
- Apoula Edel – Rapid București – 2006–2007
- **Narek Grigoryan** – **Farul Constanța** – 2023–
- Arman Karamyan – Rapid București, FC Brașov, Gloria Bistrița, Ceahlăul Piatra Neamț, Politehnica Timișoara, Steaua București, Unirea Urziceni – 2004–2011
- Artavazd Karamyan – Rapid București, Politehnica Timișoara, Steaua București, Unirea Urziceni – 2004–2011
- Romik Khachatryan – Unirea Urziceni, Universitatea Cluj – 2006–2008
- Artur Miranyan – Universitatea Cluj – 2024–2025
- Marian Zeciu – Oțelul Galați, Ceahlăul Piatra Neamț – 2004–2007

== Australia ==
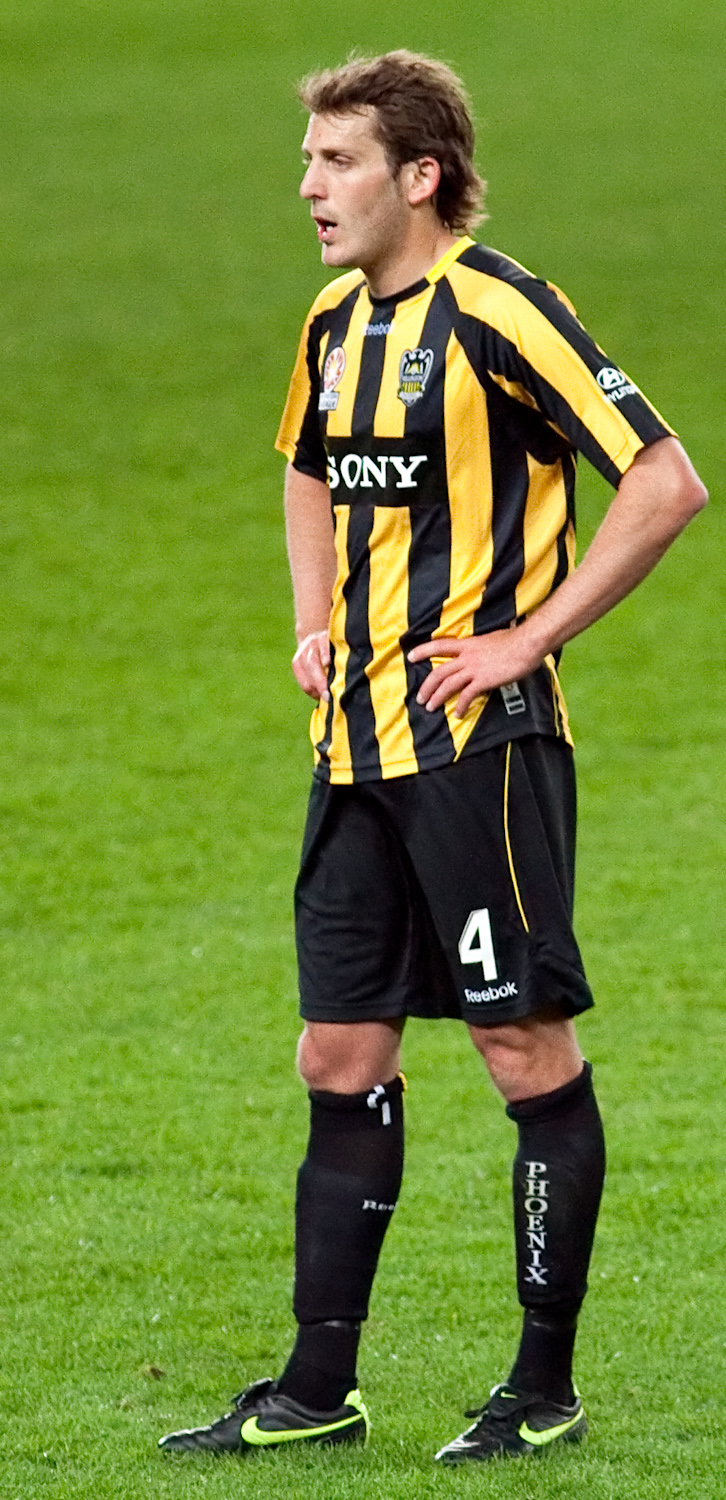
Jonathan McKain is the Australian player with the most games played in Liga I.

- Tomislav Arčaba – Gloria Buzău, Internațional Curtea de Argeș – 2008–2010
- Michael Baird – FC Universitatea Craiova – 2006–2010
- Jacob Burns – Unirea Urziceni – 2007–2009
- Anthony Carter – CFR Cluj – 2014–2016
- Spase Dilevski – FC Universitatea Craiova – 2007–2011
- Ryan Griffiths – Național București, Rapid București – 2004–2007
- Daniel McBreen – FC Universitatea Craiova – 2002–2004
- Jonathan McKain – Național București, Politehnica Timișoara – 2003–2008
- Josh Mitchell – FC Universitatea Craiova – 2006–2010
- Srećko Mitrović – Politehnica Iași – 2006–2007
- Levent Osman – Politehnica Timișoara – 2002–2003
- Joshua Rose – FC Universitatea Craiova – 2006–2010
- Wayne Srhoj – Național București, Politehnica Timișoara – 2004–2008
- Aleksandar Šušnjar – Gaz Metan Mediaș – 2016–2017
- Michael Thwaite – Național București – 2004–2006

== Austria ==
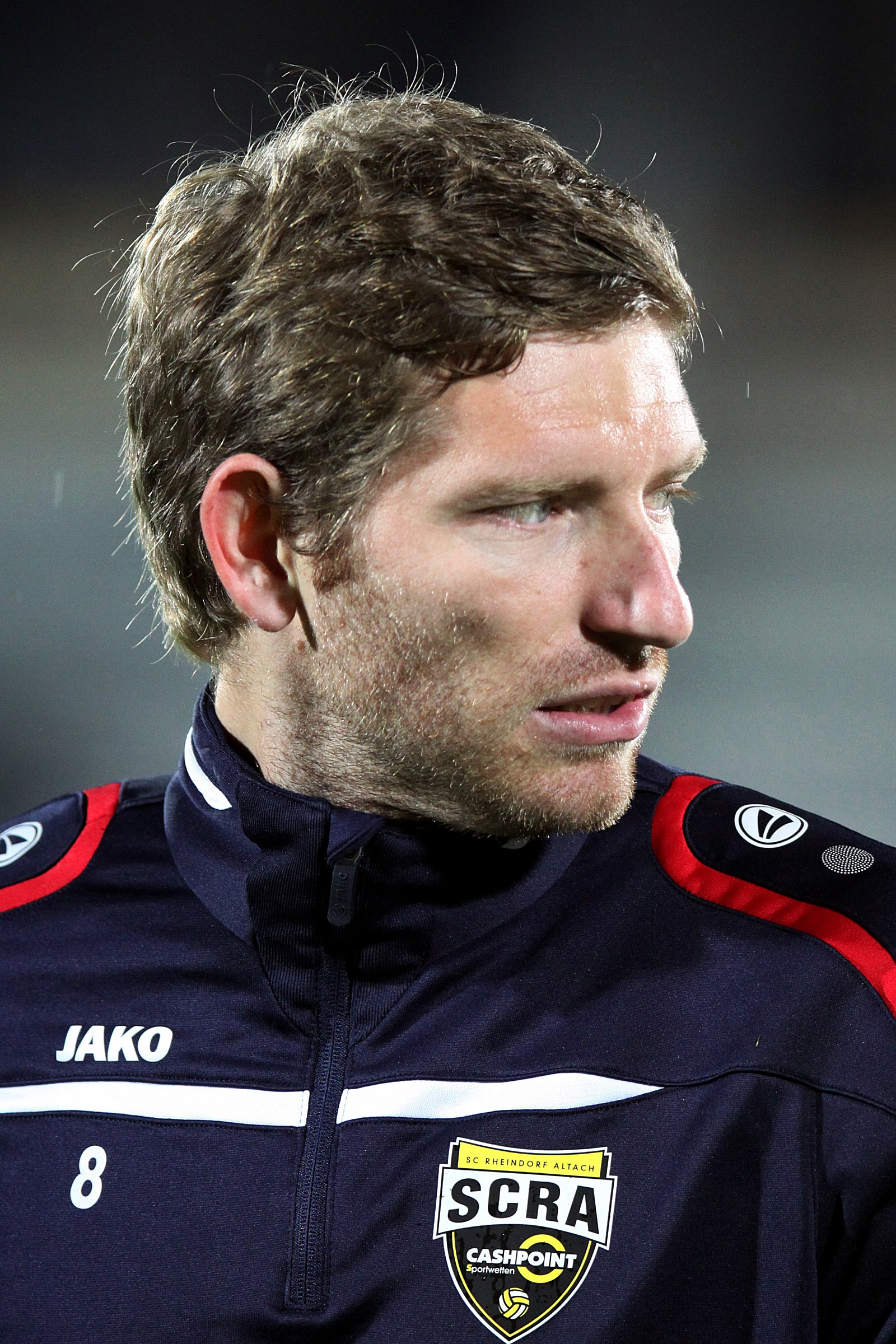
Ronald Gërçaliu played briefly in Liga I for Universitatea Cluj.

- Serkan Çiftçi – Oțelul Galați – 2014–2015
- Mario Ebenhofer – FC Botoșani – 2019–2020
- Martin Fraisl – FC Botoșani – 2018–2019
- Ronald Gërçaliu – Universitatea Cluj – 2013–2014
- Petar Gluhakovic – Dinamo București – 2021–2022
- Armin Gremsl – FC U Craiova – 2021–2022
- Hidajet Hankič – FC Botoșani – 2019–2021
- Martin Harrer – FC Voluntari – 2019–2020
- Marcel Holzmann – FC Botoșani, Sepsi Sfântu Gheorghe, Academica Clinceni – 2018–2022
- Christian Ilić – Dinamo București – 2023–2024
- Mladen Jutrić – Academica Clinceni – 2020–2022
- **Stefan Krell** – Unirea Slobozia, **Petrolul Ploiești** – 2024–
- Aleksa Marković – Sepsi Sfântu Gheorghe – 2020–2021
- Daniel Offenbacher – FC Hermannstadt – 2018–2020
- Ervin Omić – CFR Cluj – 2026–
- Andreas Leitner – Petrolul Ploiești – 2022–2023
- Daniel Sikorski – Gaz Metan Mediaș – 2016–2017
- Franz Stolz – Rapid București – 2024–2026
- Toni Tipurić – Concordia Chiajna – 2017–2018
- Aleksandar Vucenovic – UTA Arad – 2023–2024
- Stipe Vučur – FCSB – 2021–2022

== Azerbaijan ==
- Cəlal Hüseynov – Petrolul Ploiești – 2026–
- Elhad Naziri – Petrolul Ploiești – 2012–2014

== Belarus ==
- Pavel Byahanski – Oțelul Galați – 2007–2008
- Uladzimir Haew – Dinamo București – 2003–2007
- Alyaksandr Karnitsky – Sepsi Sfântu Gheorghe – 2018–2019
- Vasily Khomutovsky – Steaua București, Petrolul Ploiești – 2003–2006, 2011–2013

== Belgium ==
- Manuel Angiulli – Politehnica Iași – 2020–2021
- William Baeten – FC U Craiova, FCSB – 2021–2025
- Amine Benchaib – CS Mioveni, Farul Constanța – 2022–2024
- Roberto Bisconti – Rapid București – 2002–2003
- Samy Bourard – Oțelul Galați – 2024–2025
- Alessio Carlone – Politehnica Iași, FC Botoșani – 2019–2020
- Alessandro Ciranni – Gloria Buzău – 2024–2025
- Jimmy De Jonghe – Argeș Pitești – 2020–2022
- Emmerik De Vriese – Gaz Metan Mediaș – 2017–2018
- Kino Delorge – Dinamo București – 2018–2019
- Grégory Delwarte – Dinamo București – 2003–2004
- **Xian Emmers** – Rapid București, **Argeș Pitești** – 2022–
- Emmanuel Godfroid – Rapid București – 2002–2005
- Jérémy Huyghebaert – FC U Craiova – 2021–2024
- Nathan Kabasele – FC Voluntari – 2018–2019
- Philippe Léonard – Rapid București – 2007–2008
- Alexander Maes – Argeș Pitești – 2020–2021
- François Marquet – FC U Craiova – 2021–2023
- Ayrton Mboko – Academica Clinceni, FC Botoșani – 2021–2023
- Pieter Merlier – Universitatea Cluj, FC Universitatea Craiova – 2007–2008, 2009–2010
- Martin Remacle – FC Voluntari, FC Botoșani, Universitatea Cluj – 2020–2023
- Rubenilson – FC Universitatea Craiova – 2004–2005
- Sekou Sidibe – FC U Craiova – 2021–2024
- Jelani Trevisan – CFR Cluj – 2026–
- Jeanvion Yulu-Matondo – Oțelul Galați – 2014–2015
- Benjamin Van Durmen – FC U Craiova, UTA Arad – 2021–2026
- Floriano Vanzo – Politehnica Iași, Academica Clinceni – 2020–2022
- Matthias Verreth – Dinamo București – 2026–

== Benin ==
- Mattéo Ahlinvi – Farul Constanța – 2026–
- Désiré Azankpo – Dinamo București – 2021–2022
- **David Kiki** – Farul Constanța, FCSB, FC Voluntari – 2022–
- Djiman Koukou – Astra Giurgiu – 2018–2019
- Yohan Roche – Petrolul Ploiești – 2024–2026

== Bolivia ==
- Luis Alí – FC Hermannstadt – 2018–2019
- Nelson Cabrera – CFR Cluj – 2009–2010
- Gualberto Mojica – CFR Cluj, Petrolul Ploiești – 2006–2007, 2012–2013
- Ricardo Pedriel – Steaua București – 2008–2009

== Bosnia and Herzegovina ==
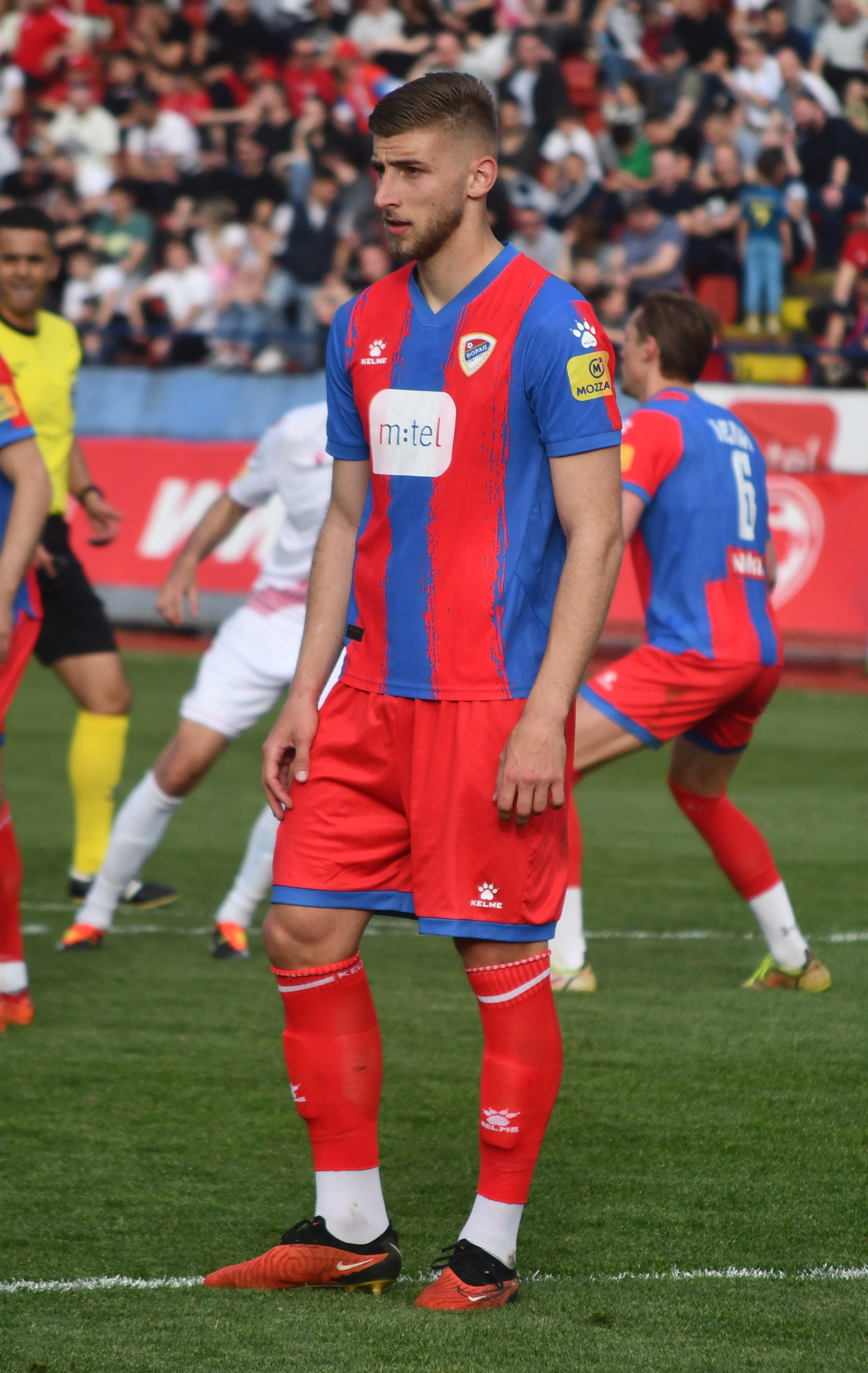
International Jovo Lukić was the league's top scorer in the 2025–26 season with 18 goals.

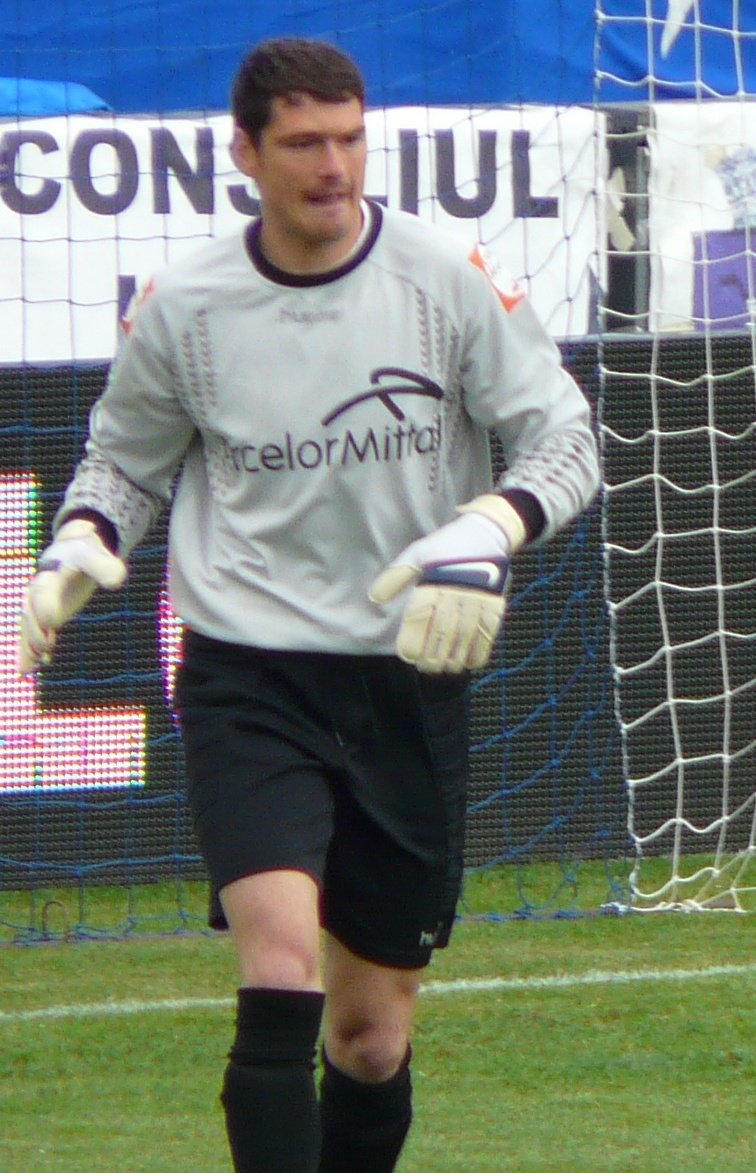
Branko Grahovac won the Liga I title with Oțelul Galați.

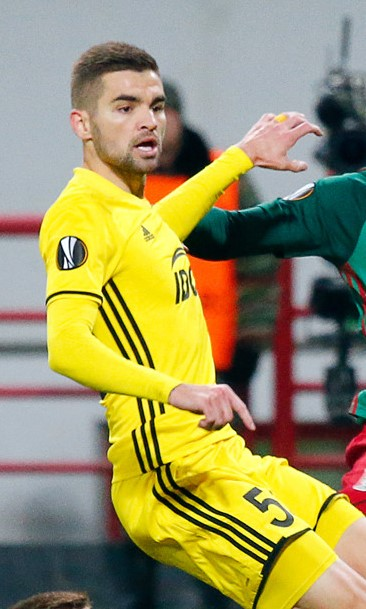
International Mateo Sušić won three consecutive Liga I titles with CFR Cluj.

- Admir Aganović – Gaz Metan Mediaș – 2010–2011
- Esmir Ahmetović – ACS Poli Timișoara – 2013–2014
- Fahrudin Aličković – CFR Cluj – 2004–2005
- Zdenko Baotić – Oțelul Galați – 2009–2010
- Luka Božičković – FC Voluntari – 2023–2024
- Gordan Bunoza – Dinamo București, Pandurii Târgu Jiu – 2014–2017
- Azer Bušuladžić – Dinamo București – 2016–2018
- Nusmir Fajić – CS Universitatea Craiova – 2016–2017
- Jovan Golić – CS Turnu Severin – 2012–2013
- Bojan Golubović – Ceahlăul Piatra Neamț, Politehnica Iași, Steaua București, Gaz Metan Mediaș, FC Botoșani – 2011–2018
- Branko Grahovac – Oțelul Galați, Politehnica Iași – 2009–2013, 2014–2017
- **Daniel Graovac** – Astra Giurgiu, CFR Cluj, FCSB, Rapid București – 2019–2023, 2024–
- Adnan Gušo – FC Universitatea Craiova, Dinamo București, Argeș Pitești, Pandurii Târgu Jiu – 2002–2008
- Benjamin Hadžić – Metaloglobus București – 2025–2026
- Mirza Hasanović – CS Turnu Severin – 2012–2013
- Damir Ibrić – Concordia Chiajna – 2012–2013
- Petar Jovanović – FC Vaslui, Politehnica Iași, CSMS Iași, Universitatea Cluj – 2005–2009, 2011–2013, 2014–2015
- Stipe Jurić – Oțelul Galați, CFR Cluj – 2024–2025
- Luka Juričić – CFR Cluj – 2023–2024
- Boris Keča – Național București, FC Brașov, Steaua București, Pandurii Târgu Jiu, Argeș Pitești – 1999–2007
- Elvir Koljić – CS Universitatea Craiova, Rapid București – 2018–2026
- Zvonimir Kožulj – CS Universitatea Craiova – 2023–2024
- Sulejman Krpić – Astra Giurgiu – 2020–2021
- Nenad Kutlačić – Pandurii Târgu Jiu – 2006–2007
- Luka Kukić – FC Botoșani – 2023–2026
- Amar Kvakić – FC U Craiova – 2023–2024
- **Jovo Lukić** – CS Universitatea Craiova, **Universitatea Cluj** – 2024–
- Ajdin Maksumić – Pandurii Târgu Jiu – 2010–2011
- Darko Maletić – FC Vaslui – 2005–2006
- Bojan Marković – CSMS Iași – 2014–2015
- Dejan Martinović – FC Brașov – 2010–2011
- Ilija Mašić – CFR Cluj – 2025–2026
- Slaviša Mitrović – Național București – 1999–2005
- Adi Nalić – CFR Cluj – 2026–
- Stevo Nikolić – Oțelul Galați – 2008–2009
- Zoran Novaković – Steaua București – 1999–2000
- Aleksandar Obrenović – Bihor Oradea – 2003–2004
- Denis Omerbegović – Ceahlăul Piatra Neamț – 2011–2012
- Omar Pašagić – Metaloglobus București – 2025–2026
- Denis Pozder – FC Vaslui – 2013–2014
- Igor Radovanović – Pandurii Târgu Jiu, Ceahlăul Piatra Neamț – 2006–2007, 2011–2012
- **Rijad Sadiku** – **FC Botoșani** – 2022–
- Ivan Sesar – SC Juventus București, FC Voluntari – 2017–2019
- Enes Šipović – Oțelul Galați, Petrolul Ploiești – 2009–2010, 2011–2015
- Duško Stajić – Ceahlăul Piatra Neamț – 2006–2007
- Saša Stević – Ceahlăul Piatra Neamț – 2009–2010
- Nemanja Supić – Politehnica Timișoara – 2009–2010
- Mateo Sušić – CFR Cluj – 2014–2015, 2019–2022
- Riad Šuta – FC Botoșani – 2025–2026
- Borislav Topić – FCM Târgu Mureș – 2010–2012
- Stojan Vranješ – Pandurii Târgu Jiu, CFR Cluj – 2009–2012
- Dženan Zajmović – Politehnica Iași – 2020–2021
- Goran Zakarić – CS Universitatea Craiova – 2019–2020
- Damir Zlomislić – FC Brașov – 2014–2015

== Brazil ==
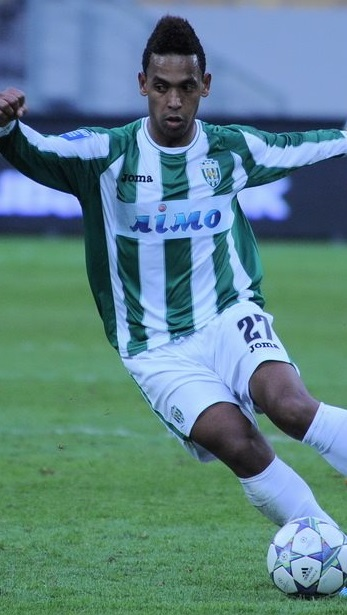
Eric de Oliveira won the Liga I Foreign Player of the Year award twice.

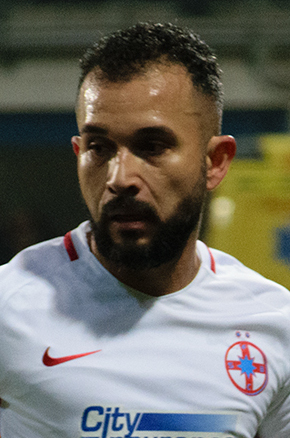
Júnior Morais played in 320 Liga I matches, winning the title with Astra Giurgiu.

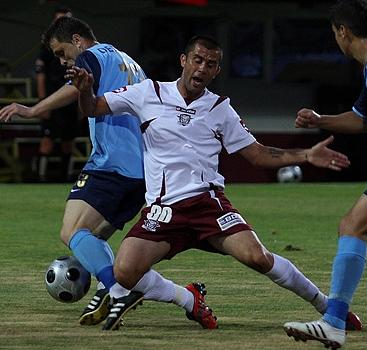
Juliano Spadacio scored 25 goals in 107 Liga I games for Rapid București and Astra Ploiești.

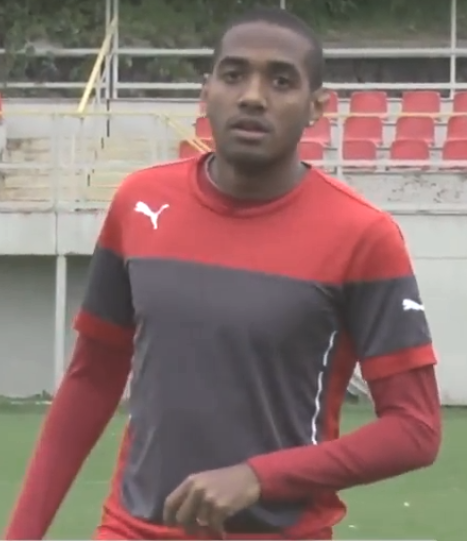
During his time at Astra, William de Amorim managed to win the Liga I title.

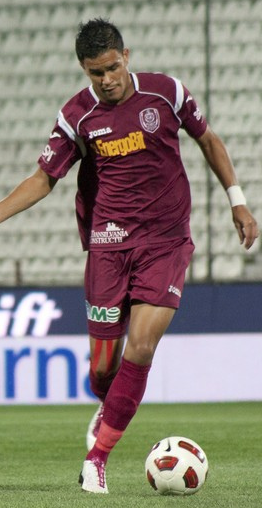
Rafael Bastos won the Liga I title with CFR Cluj.

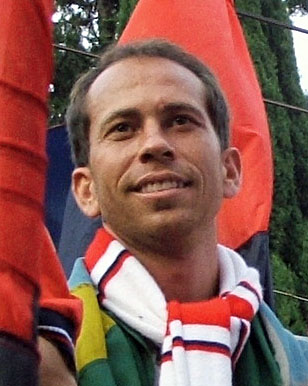
Adaílton concluded his European career by spending two years at FC Vaslui, scoring 17 goals in 59 Liga I appearances.

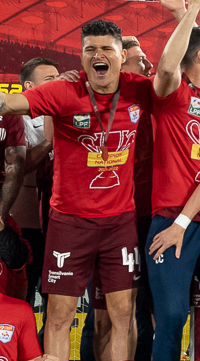
Yuri Matias won the Liga I title with CFR Cluj.

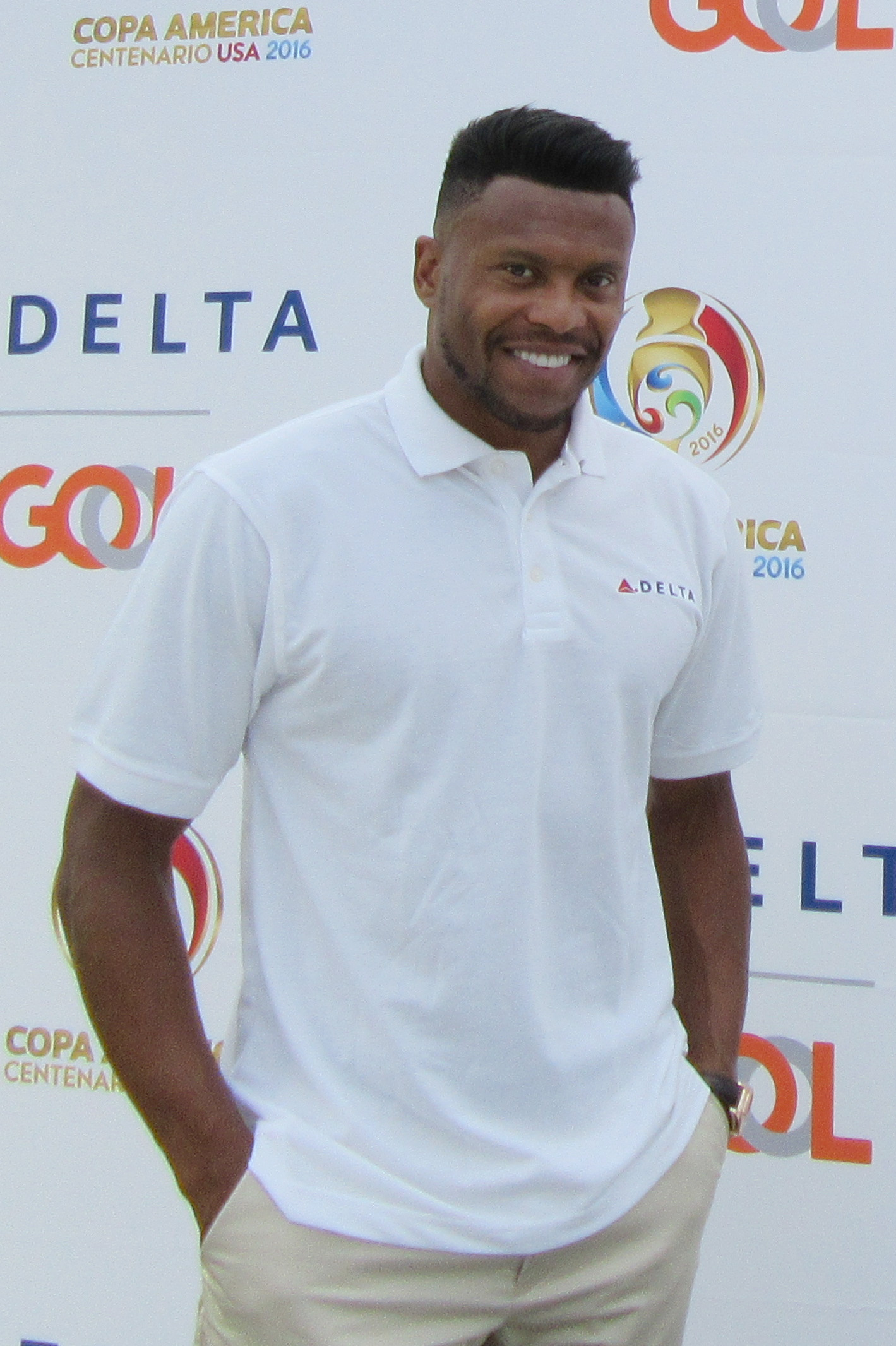
Júlio Baptista ended his playing career with CFR Cluj.

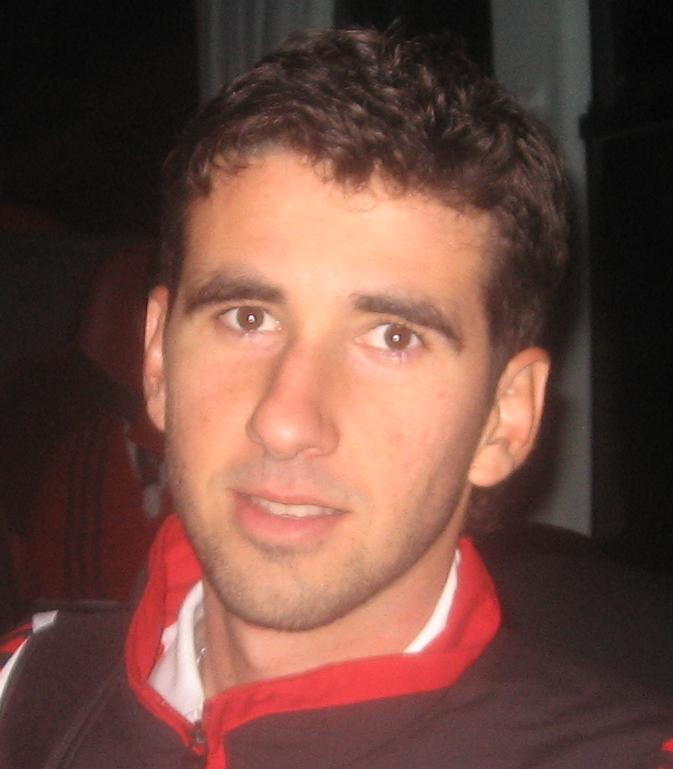
Gláuber spent two seasons in Liga I with Rapid București.

- Adaílton – FC Vaslui – 2010–2012
- Luís Alberto – CFR Cluj – 2012–2013
- Hugo Alcântara – CFR Cluj – 2008–2011
- Allanzinho – Politehnica Iași – 2023–2024
- Mauro Alonso – FC Brașov – 2011–2012
- Altamir – Național București – 2006–2007
- Leandro Alves – FC Universitatea Craiova – 2002–2003
- Lucas Alves – Dinamo București – 2023–2024
- Amauri – ASA Târgu Mureș – 2014–2015
- William de Amorim – Astra Giurgiu, FCSB, Academica Clinceni – 2010–2018, 2021–2022
- Anderson – FC Vaslui – 2011–2012
- John Anderson – FC Voluntari – 2020–2021
- Elinton Andrade – Rapid București – 2007–2009
- Andrey – Steaua București – 2006–2007
- José Anilton – Pandurii Târgu Jiu – 2007–2008
- Marcos António – Rapid București – 2010–2012
- João Felipe Antunes – Oțelul Galați – 2012–2014
- Ademar Aparecido – Gloria Buzău – 2008–2009
- Thiago Araújo – Viitorul Constanța – 2013–2014
- Arthuro – Steaua București – 2008–2009
- André Astorga – Universitatea Cluj – 2007–2008
- Roberto Ayza – Ceahlăul Piatra Neamț, Gloria Bistrița, CS Mioveni – 2007–2008, 2011–2013
- Erison Baiano – Universitatea Cluj – 2007–2008
- Fabricio Baiano – Petrolul Ploiești – 2024–2026
- Júlio Baptista – CFR Cluj – 2018–2019
- Rafael Bastos – CFR Cluj – 2010–2013
- Henrique Bernardo – Oțelul Galați, ASA Târgu Mureș, Viitorul Constanța – 2013–2015
- Gláuber Berti – Rapid București – 2010–2013
- Miguel Bianconi – ACS Poli Timișoara – 2017–2018
- Fábio Bilica – Universitatea Cluj – 2007–2008
- Fernando Boldrin – Concordia Chiajna, Astra Giurgiu, Steaua București – 2014–2017
- Léo Bolgado – CFR Cluj, Rapid București – 2024–2026
- Éder Bonfim – Politehnica Timișoara, Gloria Buzău, Steaua București – 2008–2011
- Túlio Borges – Universitatea Cluj – 2012–2013
- Alex Braz – Universitatea Cluj – 2012–2013
- Brendon – Argeș Pitești – 2022–2023
- Gustavo Cabral – Csíkszereda – 2025–2026
- Caio – Argeș Pitești – 2025–2026
- Luan Campos – Oțelul Galați – 2025–2026
- Carlos Cardoso – Pandurii Târgu Jiu – 2007–2012
- Gustavo Cascardo – Sepsi Sfântu Gheorghe – 2026–
- Cauê – FC Vaslui – 2012–2014
- Alessandro Celin – Concordia Chiajna – 2016–2017
- Celsinho – FCM Târgu Mureș – 2011–2012
- Césinha – Rapid București, Petrolul Ploiești – 2007–2011, 2012–2013
- Conrado – Oțelul Galați – 2025–2026
- Thiago Constância – Dinamo București – 2008–2009
- Élton Constantino da Silva – Pandurii Târgu Jiu – 2013–2015
- Erico Constantino da Silva – Universitatea Cluj, Pandurii Târgu Jiu, Astra Giurgiu, UTA Arad – 2012–2019, 2020–2023
- Gustavo Costa – Farul Constanța – 2023–2024
- Anderson Ceará – Csíkszereda – 2025–2027
- Júlio César Correa – Dinamo București – 2008–2009
- Cleyton – Universitatea Cluj – 2012–2013
- Orlando da Costa – Concordia Chiajna – 2013–2014
- Danilo – Gloria Bistrița – 2008–2009
- Jean Deretti – Academica Clinceni – 2019–2020
- Didi – CFR Cluj, FCM Târgu Mureș, Oțelul Galați – 2006–2013
- Fabrício Dornellas – Astra Giurgiu – 2016–2017
- Edimar – CFR Cluj – 2009–2011, 2012–2014
- Edmílson – Pandurii Târgu Jiu – 2007–2008
- Edvan – Universitatea Cluj – 2007–2008
- Élton – Steaua București – 2007–2008
- Marcelina Emerson – Viitorul Constanța – 2013–2014
- Everton – Gloria Buzău – 2008–2009
- Ezequias – FC Brașov, Rapid București – 2008–2012
- Vinicius Fabbron – Ceahlăul Piatra Neamț – 2007–2008, 2009–2010, 2011–2012
- Fabinho – FC Brașov – 2008–2009
- João Ferreira – Farul Constanța – 2026–
- Christian Fiel – CFR Cluj – 2014–2015
- Edmar Figueira – Ceahlăul Piatra Neamț – 2011–2012
- Elton Figueiredo – Dinamo București – 2013–2015
- Marcelo Freitas – UTA Arad – 2023–2024
- Denílson Gabionetta – CFR Cluj – 2013–2014
- André Galiassi – CFR Cluj, Unirea Alba Iulia, Concordia Chiajna – 2006–2010, 2011–2012
- Gabriel Gama – FC Botoșani – 2026–
- Renan Garcia – CFR Cluj – 2011–2012
- **Guilherme Garutti** – CS Mioveni, Petrolul Ploiești, **Argeș Pitești** – 2021–2024, 2025–
- Rafael Garutti – Unirea Slobozia – 2025–2026
- Diego Gaúcho – FC Brașov, Astra Ploiești – 2010–2012
- Willian Gerlem – Farul Constanța, FC Vaslui – 2006–2012
- Gerson – Petrolul Ploiești – 2013–2015
- Gil Bahia – FC Vaslui – 2013–2014
- Gladstone – FC Vaslui – 2009–2012
- Alex dos Santos Gonçalves – Concordia Chiajna, Universitatea Cluj, Pandurii Târgu Jiu – 2011–2014
- Grillo – Gaz Metan Mediaș – 2008–2009
- Gustavinho – Rapid București – 2010–2011
- Halisson – FCM Târgu Mureș – 2011–2012
- Gustavo Hebling – FC Botoșani – 2023–2024
- Pedro Henrique – ACS Poli Timișoara – 2015–2017
- Dos Santos Itamar – FC Brașov – 2002–2003
- Jackson – Pandurii Târgu Jiu – 2007–2008
- Jair – Petrolul Ploiești, **FC Hermannstadt** – 2022–2024, 2025–2026
- Carlos Jatobá – Politehnica Iași – 2023–2024
- Jessui – Pandurii Târgu Jiu – 2007–2008
- Cardoso Júnior – FC Brașov – 2010–2011
- Jaime Júnior – CS Otopeni – 2008–2009
- Jefferson Júnior – Petrolul Ploiești – 2022–2024
- Renato Kanu – FC Brașov – 2011–2012
- **Kazu** – **Oțelul Galați** – 2025–
- Kleyr – Gloria Buzău – 2007–2008
- Rafael Kneif – Ceahlăul Piatra Neamț – 2014–2015
- Laio dos Santos – Gloria Bistrița – 2012–2013
- Laionel – Astra Ploiești – 2011–2012
- Alex Leandro – Unirea Urziceni – 2006–2007
- Manoel Lemes – Gloria Buzău – 2008–2009
- Lexandro – Gaz Metan Mediaș – 2014–2015
- Fábio Lima – Gloria Buzău – 2008–2009
- Gabriel Lima – Csíkszereda – 2026–
- Igor de Lima – FC Vaslui – 2005–2006
- Luis Lima – Rapid București – 1999–2000
- Lionn – CFR Cluj – 2011–2012
- David Lopes – FC Universitatea Craiova – 2010–2011
- Gabriel Machado – Universitatea Cluj, Steaua București – 2010–2012, 2013–2014
- Madson – FC Vaslui, CS Universitatea Craiova – 2013–2017
- Edu Magri – FC Universitatea Craiova – 2004–2005
- Maicon – Steaua București − 2010−2011
- **Gustavo Marins** – **Farul Constanța** – 2022–
- Marcus Marquinhos – Oțelul Galați, Astra Giurgiu – 2012−2014, 2017–2018
- Mario Marquinhos – FC Universitatea Craiova – 2004–2005
- Bruno Martins – ASA Târgu Mureș – 2014−2016
- Matheus Mascarenhas – FC U Craiova – 2022–2024
- Yuri Matias – Gaz Metan Mediaș, CFR Cluj – 2020–2023
- Hélder Maurílio – Rapid București, Dinamo București, Politehnica Timișoara – 2009–2011
- Rodrigo Menezes – Universitatea Cluj – 2013–2014
- Michel Platini Mesquita – Dinamo București – 2011–2012
- Wanderson Miranda – Corona Brașov, Dinamo București – 2013–2015
- Bruno Moraes – Gloria Bistrița – 2010–2011
- Marquinhos Moraes – Gloria Bistrița – 2012–2013
- Júnior Morais – Astra Giurgiu, FCSB, Rapid București, Metaloglobus București − 2010−2019, 2021−2024, 2025−2026
- Gabriel Moura – Sepsi Sfântu Gheorghe, Dinamo București, Gaz Metan Mediaș – 2018–2022, 2023–2024
- Dudu Nardini – Politehnica Iași – 2024–2025
- Ricardo Nascimento – Astra Giurgiu – 2011–2012
- Nei – CFR Cluj – 2009–2010
- Aluisio Neres – Rapid București – 2004–2005
- Nivaldo – Rapid București, FCM Bacău, FC Vaslui – 2000–2003, 2005–2006
- André Nunes – Gloria Buzău – 2007–2008
- Fábio Nunes – Pandurii Târgu Jiu – 2007–2008
- Olberdam – Rapid Bucureşti, Concordia Chiajna – 2010–2011, 2014–2015
- Eric de Oliveira – Gaz Metan Mediaș, Pandurii Târgu Jiu, Viitorul Constanța, FC Voluntari – 2008–2011, 2012–2015, 2016–2021
- Paulinho – Universitatea Cluj – 2014–2015
- Daniel Paulista – Rapid București – 2008–2009
- Peterson Peçanha – Rapid București, Petrolul Ploiești, Viitorul Constanța – 2012–2016
- Marquinhos Pedroso – Viitorul Constanța, CS Mioveni – 2020–2021, 2022–2023
- Rafael Pereira – Gaz Metan Mediaș – 2008–2009
- Luis Phelipe – Politehnica Iași, FCSB – 2023–2025
- Johnes Elias Pinto – Unirea Alba Iulia – 2009–2010
- Romário Pires – Gloria Bistrița, Petrolul Ploiești, Astra Giurgiu, FC Hermannstadt, Farul Constanța, Universitatea Cluj – 2012–2014, 2018–2023
- Cláudio Pitbull – Rapid București – 2008–2009
- João Marcos Quintanilha – Corona Brașov – 2013–2014
- Anselmo Ramon – CFR Cluj – 2010–2011
- Fabiano Ramos – Apulum Alba Iulia – 2003–2004
- Thiago Ramos – UTA Arad – 2006–2007
- Davi Rancan – Oțelul Galați – 2005–2007
- Reinaldo – Universitatea Cluj – 2010–2011
- Reginaldo – Farul Constanța – 2024–2025
- Rivaldinho – Dinamo București, Viitorul Constanța, CS Universitatea Craiova, Farul Constanța – 2016–2020, 2022–2025
- Tiago Roberto – Gloria Buzău – 2008–2009
- Adi Rocha – Concordia Chiajna, Steaua București – 2011–2013
- Rafael Rocha – Politehnica Timișoara, Concordia Chiajna – 2010–2011, 2012–2013
- Roger – UTA Arad, CFR Cluj, Universitatea Cluj, Corvinul Hunedoara – 2020–2024, 2026–
- Rogério – Rapid București – 2004–2005
- Ronny – CFR Cluj – 2011–2013
- Rudison – Ceahlăul Piatra Neamț – 2009–2010
- Alisson Safira – CS Universitatea Craiova – 2024–2025
- Mateus Santos – FC Botoșani, Farul Constanța – 2021–2024
- Jô Santos – Politehnica Iași, FC Hermannstadt, Viitorul Constanța – 2017–2018, 2019–2021
- Jája Silva – FC Botoșani – 2021–2022
- Raul Silva – CS Universitatea Craiova – 2022–2024
- Renan Silva – Rapid București, Petrolul Ploiești – 2011–2013
- Ayres Simão – Gloria Bistrița – 2007–2008
- Guilherme Sityá – Concordia Chiajna, Petrolul Ploiești, Steaua București – 2011–2016
- William Soares – CFR Cluj – 2020–2021
- Júlio César Souza – Rapid București – 2008–2009
- Juliano Spadacio – Rapid București, Astra Ploiești – 2008–2012
- Tailson – Politehnica Iași – 2024–2025
- Talisson – Rapid București – 2025–2026
- Marcos Tamandaré – Rapid București – 2007–2008
- Leandro Tatu – Steaua București – 2011–2014
- Rodrigo Teixeira – Ceahlăul Piatra Neamț – 2000–2001
- Ruan Teles – Argeș Pitești – 2020–2022
- Thalisson – Universitatea Cluj – 2023–2024
- André Todescato – Politehnica Iași – 2008–2009
- Thiago Tremonti – Pandurii Târgu Jiu – 2008–2010
- Gustavo Vagenin – CS Universitatea Craiova – 2016–2018, 2019–2020, 2021–2023
- Cássio Vargas – Rapid București – 2010–2012
- Lucas de Vega – FC Botoșani – 2025–
- Léo Veloso – CFR Cluj – 2009–2011
- André Vieira – Oțelul Galați – 2002–2003
- Ricardo Vilana – Unirea Urziceni, Steaua București – 2006–2011
- Paulo Vinícius – CFR Cluj, FCSB – 2017–2022
- Vitinho – Gaz Metan Mediaș – 2011–2015
- Francisco Wagsley – Ceahlăul Piatra Neamț – 2014–2015
- Walace – Rapid București, SC Juventus București, FC Voluntari, Dunărea Călărași – 2012–2013, 2017–2019
- Wandeir – Pandurii Târgu Jiu – 2008–2009
- Weldon – CFR Cluj – 2011–2013
- Wellington – Concordia Chiajna, Pandurii Târgu Jiu – 2013–2016
- Wellyson – Ceahlăul Piatra Neamț – 2014–2015
- Wendel – FC Universitatea Craiova – 2010–2011
- Wesley – FC Vaslui, CSMS Iași – 2009–2013, 2014–2015
- José Williams – FC Brașov – 2010–2011
- Willie – FC Botoșani, UTA Arad – 2016–2017, 2022–2023
- Ygor – Gloria Bistrița – 2010–2011

== Bulgaria ==
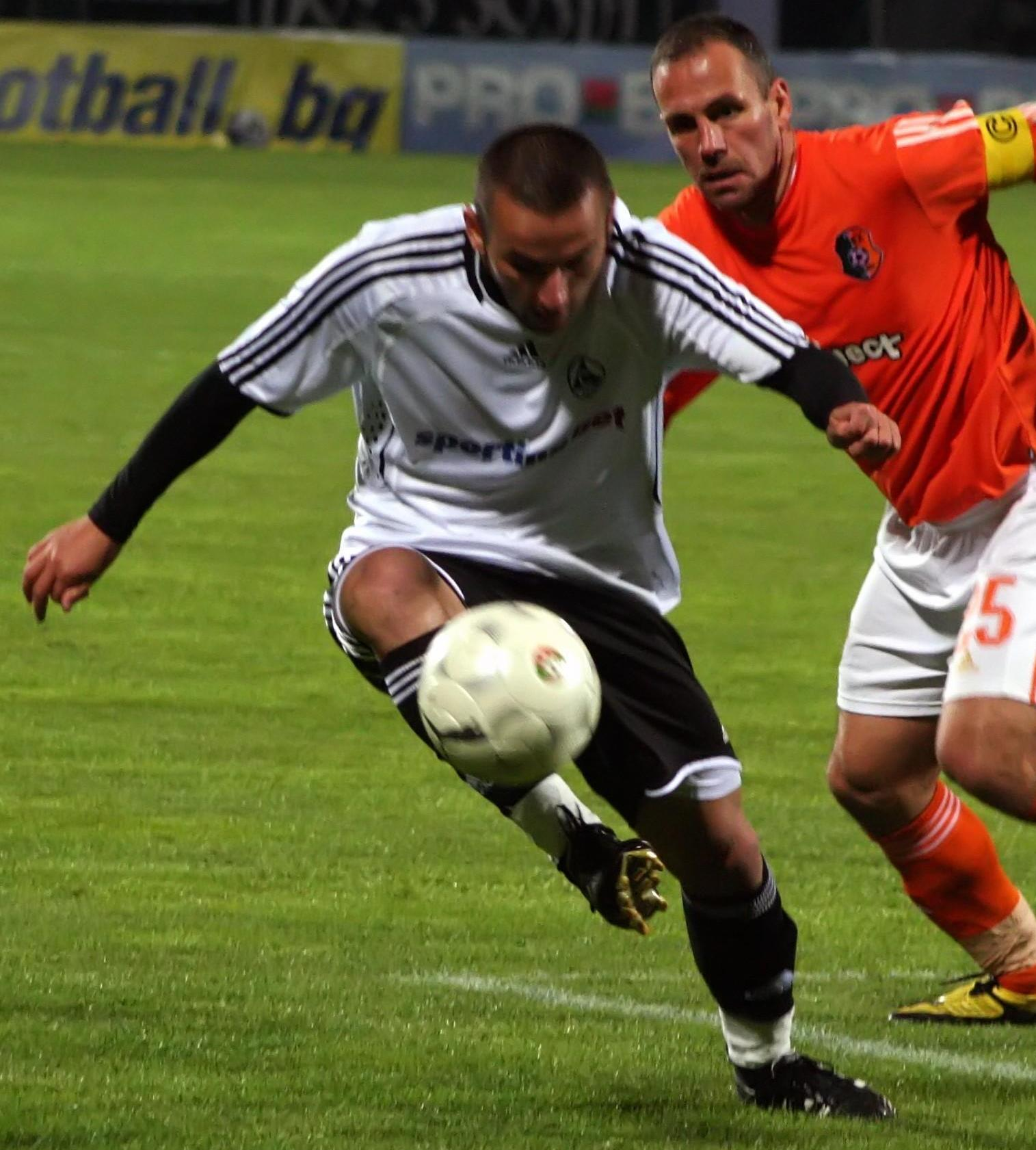
Radoslav Dimitrov appeared in 216 Liga I games for FC Botoșani, CS Universitatea Craiova and Sepsi Sfântu Gheorghe.

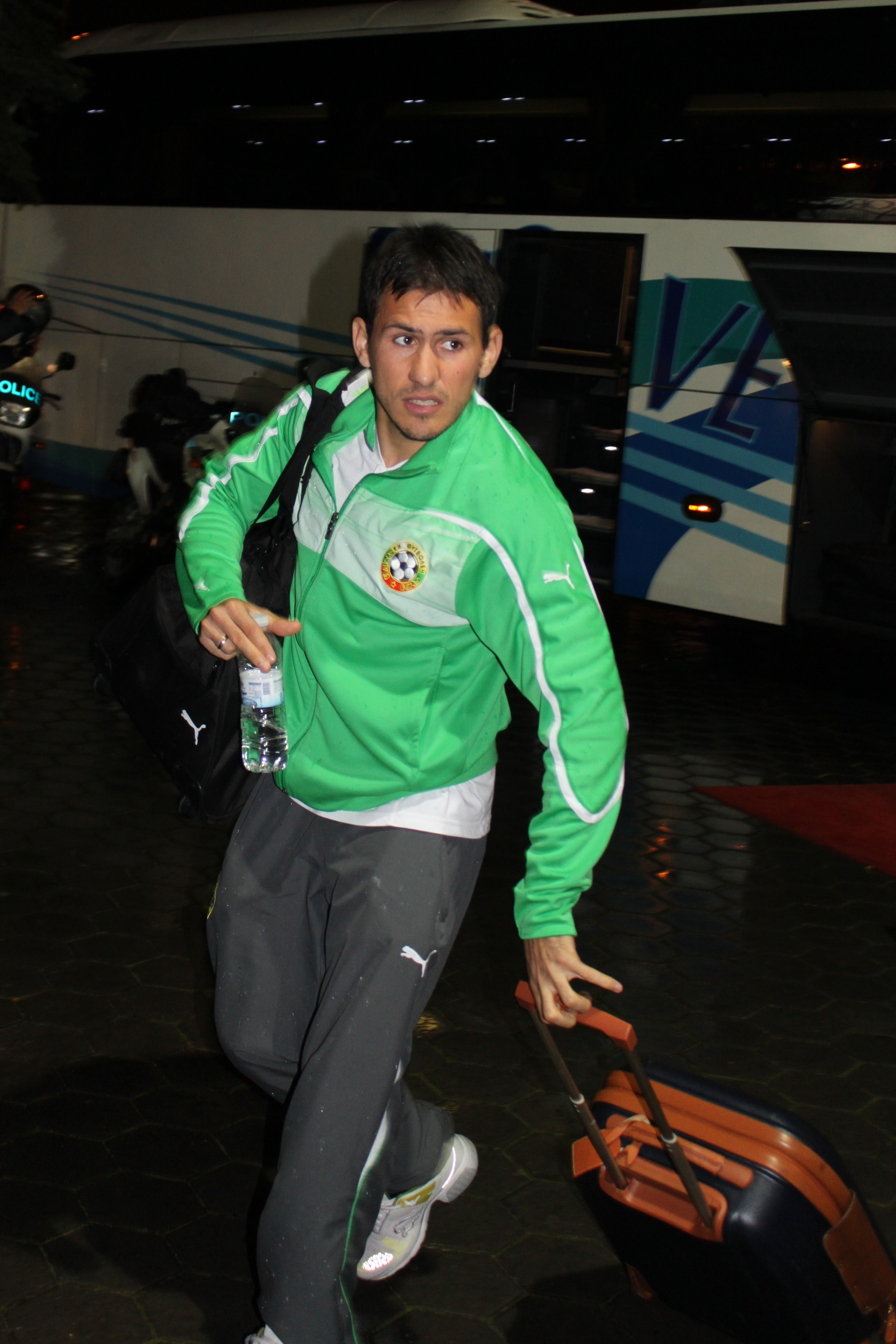
Zhivko Milanov made 104 Liga I appearances for FC Vaslui.

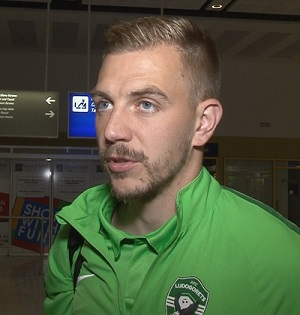
Plamen Iliev played 133 Liga I matches while representing five different teams.

- Stanislav Angelov – Steaua București – 2010–2011
- Krum Bibishkov – Steaua București – 2009–2010
- Atanas Bornosuzov – Astra Ploiești – 2010–2011
- Asen Chandarov – Academica Clinceni – 2020–2022
- Bozhidar Chorbadzhiyski – FCSB, FC Hermannstadt – 2019–2020, 2025–2026
- Tsvetelin Chunchukov – Academica Clinceni, Sepsi Sfântu Gheorghe, Chindia Târgoviște – 2020–2022
- Iliya Dimitrov – Oțelul Galați – 2023–2024
- Kristian Dimitrov – CFR Cluj – 2021–2022
- Radoslav Dimitrov – FC Botoșani, CS Universitatea Craiova, Sepsi Sfântu Gheorghe, Universitatea Cluj – 2015–2024
- Aleksandar Dyulgerov – Concordia Chiajna – 2014–2015
- Diego Ferraresso – Gloria Buzău – 2024–2025
- Venelin Filipov – FC Voluntari – 2015–2018
- Boris Galchev – Dinamo București – 2012–2013
- Emil Gargorov – FC Universitatea Craiova – 2010–2011
- Stanislav Genchev – FC Vaslui – 2008–2011
- Viktor Genev – Petrolul Ploiești – 2015–2016
- Vladimir Gogov – Academica Clinceni – 2021–2022
- Ivan Goranov – Universitatea Cluj – 2022–2023
- Yordan Gospodinov – Concordia Chiajna – 2011–2012
- Plamen Iliev – FC Botoșani, Astra Giurgiu, Dinamo București, FC Hermannstadt, Universitatea Cluj – 2015–2019, 2021–2024
- Valentin Iliev – FC Universitatea Craiova, Steaua București, CS Universitatea Craiova – 2009–2012, 2015–2016
- Antoni Ivanov – Gaz Metan Mediaș, CS Universitatea Craiova, FC Voluntari, Dinamo București, FC Botoșani, FC Hermannstadt, UTA Arad – 2018–
- Mario Kirev – ACS Poli Timișoara – 2013–2014
- Rosen Kirilov – FC Vaslui – 2008–2009
- Georgi Kitanov – Astra Giurgiu – 2019–2020
- Stoyan Kolev – Oțelul Galați – 2007–2010
- Plamen Krumov – Concordia Chiajna, Universitatea Cluj – 2011–2013
- Milen Lahchev – Concordia Chiajna – 2011–2012
- Miroslav Manolov – ASA Târgu Mureș – 2014–2016
- Ivaylo Markov – UTA Arad – 2023–2024
- Georgi Milanov – Dinamo București – 2023–2026
- Zhivko Milanov – FC Vaslui – 2009–2013
- Bozhidar Mitrev – FC Voluntari – 2018–2020
- Georgi Pashov – Academica Clinceni, Petrolul Ploiești – 2020–2023
- Ilko Pirgov – CS Otopeni – 2008–2009
- Apostol Popov – CS Universitatea Craiova – 2015–2018
- Milen Radukanov – Naţional București – 1999–2000
- Martin Raynov – Argeș Pitești – 2021–2023
- Georgi Sarmov – ACS Poli Timișoara – 2015–2016
- Radostin Stanev – Național București – 2004–2007
- Orlin Starokin – Dinamo București – 2015–2016
- Martin Toshev – Academica Clinceni – 2020–2021
- Aleksandar Tsvetkov – Academica Clinceni – 2021–2022
- Chigozie Udoji – Astra Ploiești, FC Brașov – 2011–2012
- Stefan Velev – Sepsi Sfântu Gheorghe – 2018–2020
- Pavel Vidanov – Rapid București – 2010–2011
- **Milen Zhelev** – **Oțelul Galați** – 2023–
- Zhivko Zhelev – Oțelul Galați, Steaua București – 2007–2010
- Hristo Zlatinski – CS Universitatea Craiova, Steaua București – 2015–2019

== Burkina Faso ==
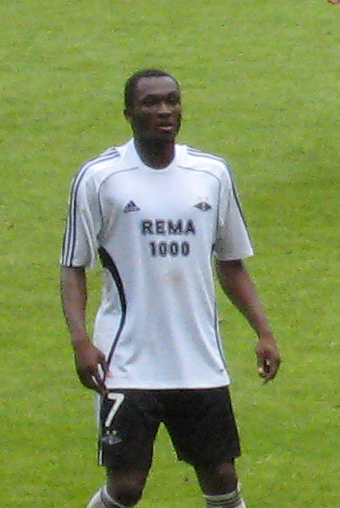
Yssouf Koné won a Liga I title with CFR Cluj.

- Narcisse Bambara – Concordia Chiajna, Universitatea Cluj – 2012–2015
- Chec Doumbia – Rapid București – 2026–
- Djakaridja Koné – Dinamo București – 2009–2012
- Yssouf Koné – CFR Cluj – 2008–2011
- Paul Koulibaly – Dinamo București – 2012–2013
- Salif Nogo – Oțelul Galați, Politehnica Iași, Astra Ploiești – 2005–2012
- Latif Ouedraogo – Rapid București – 2026–
- Bakary Saré – CFR Cluj – 2010–2013
- Hassane Traoré – Farul Constanța – 2026–
- François Yabré – Oțelul Galați – 2023–2024
- Blaise Yaméogo – Chindia Târgoviște – 2019–2021
- Mamadou Zongo – Universitatea Cluj – 2007–2008

== Burundi ==
- Mohamed Tchité – Petrolul Ploiești – 2014–2015

== Cameroon ==
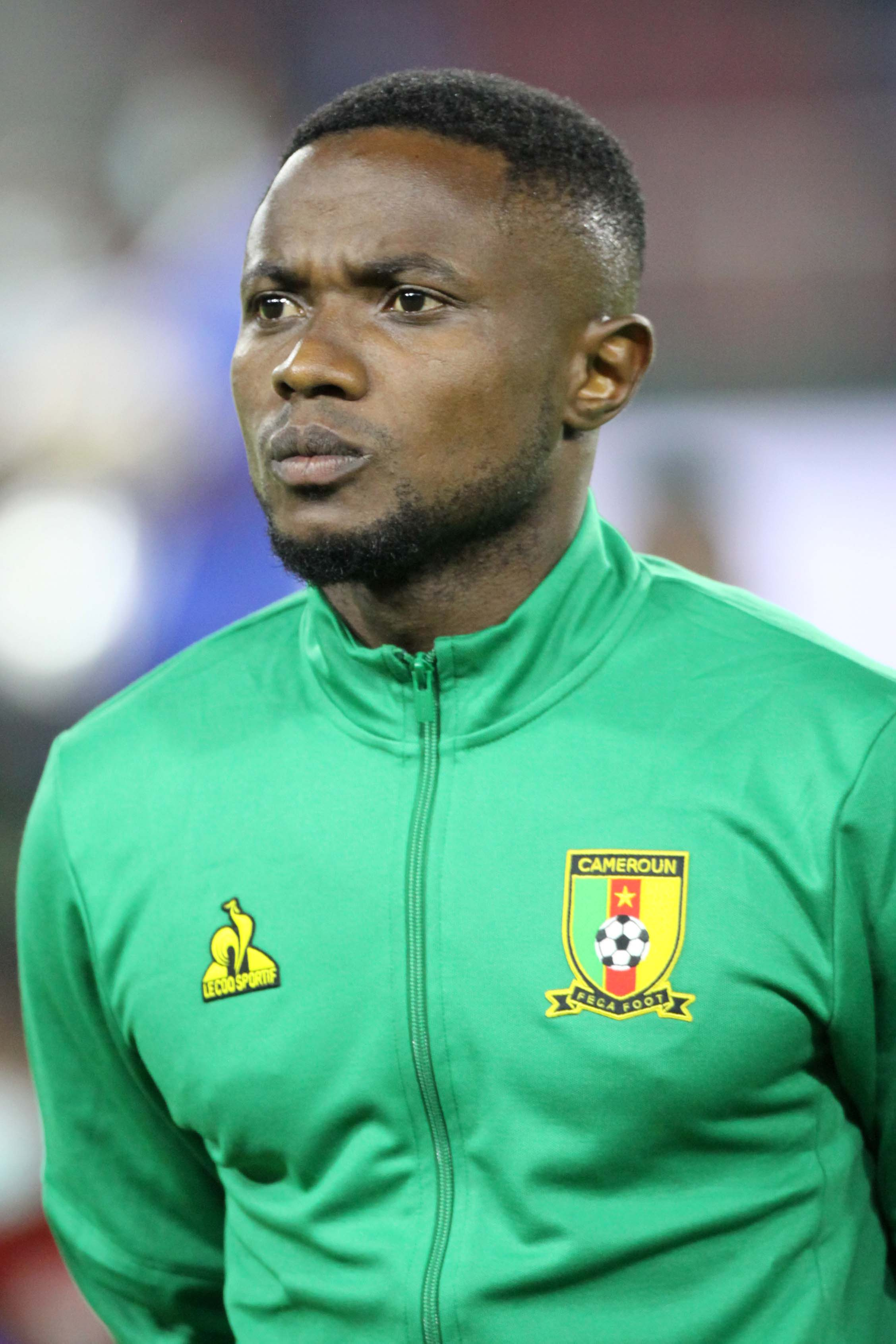
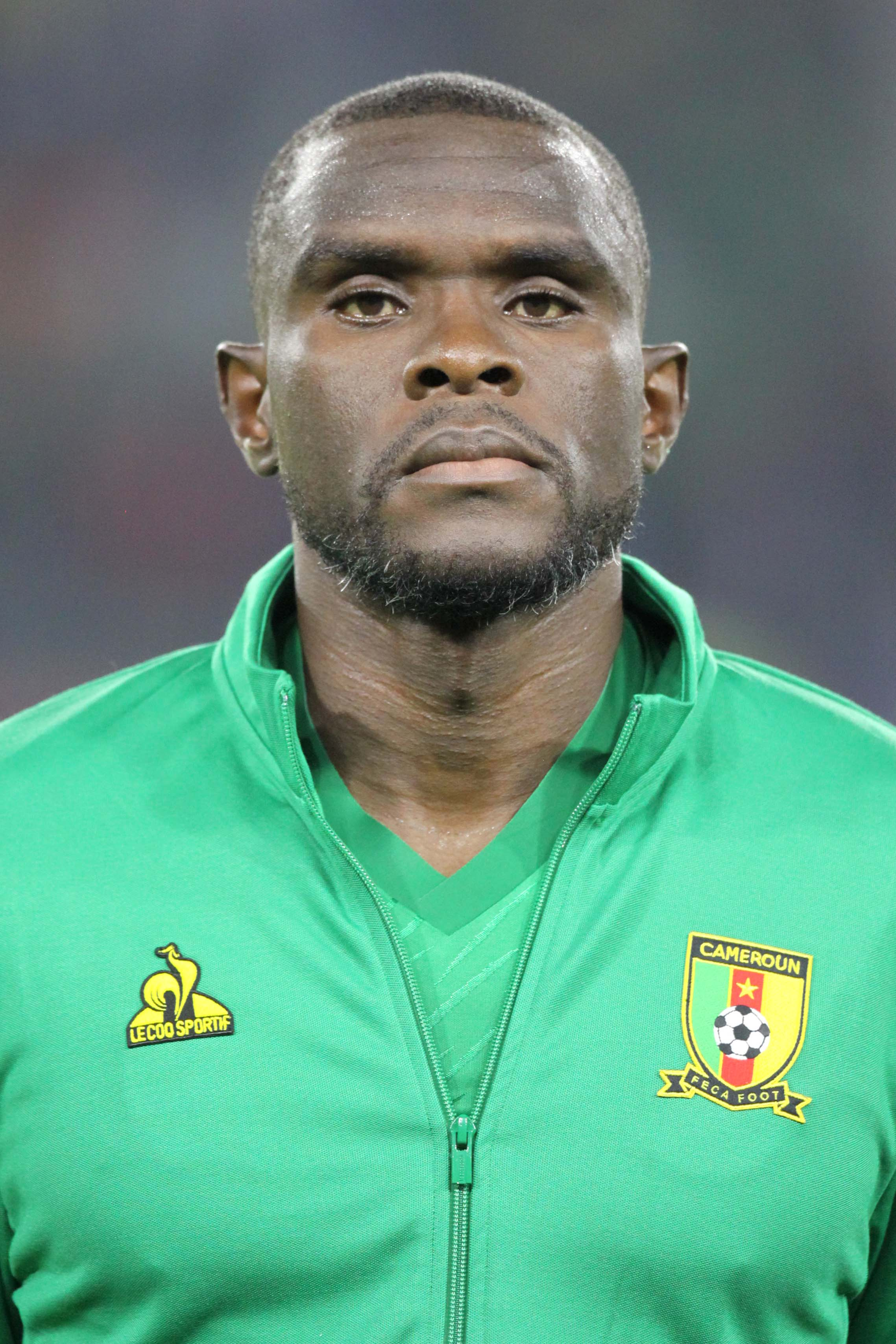
Before winning together the 2017 Africa Cup of Nations, Collins Fai (left) and Michael Ngadeu-Ngadjui (right) played in Liga I for Dinamo București and FC Botoșani respectively.

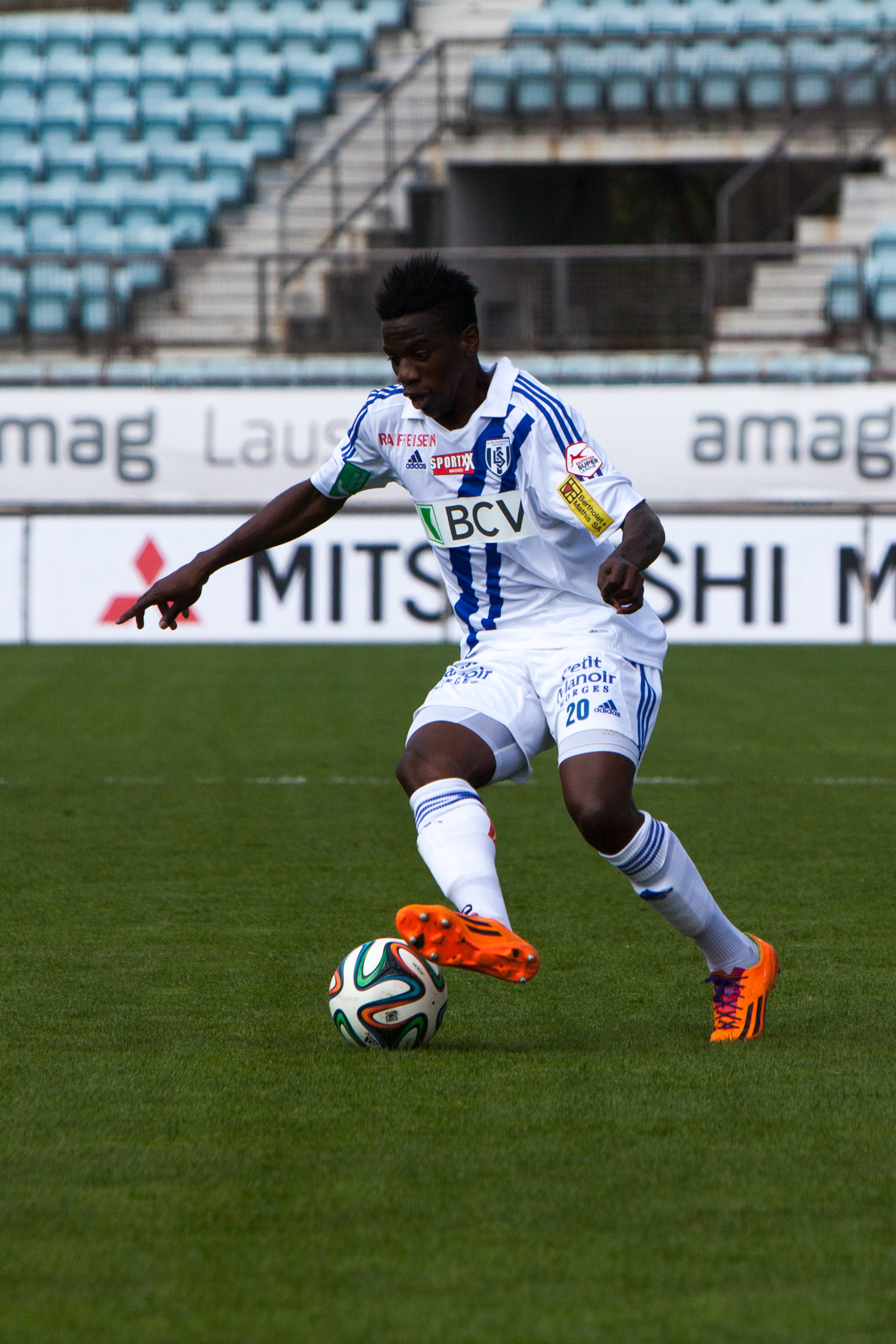
Patrick Ekeng died while playing for Dinamo București in a Liga I game against Viitorul Constanța.

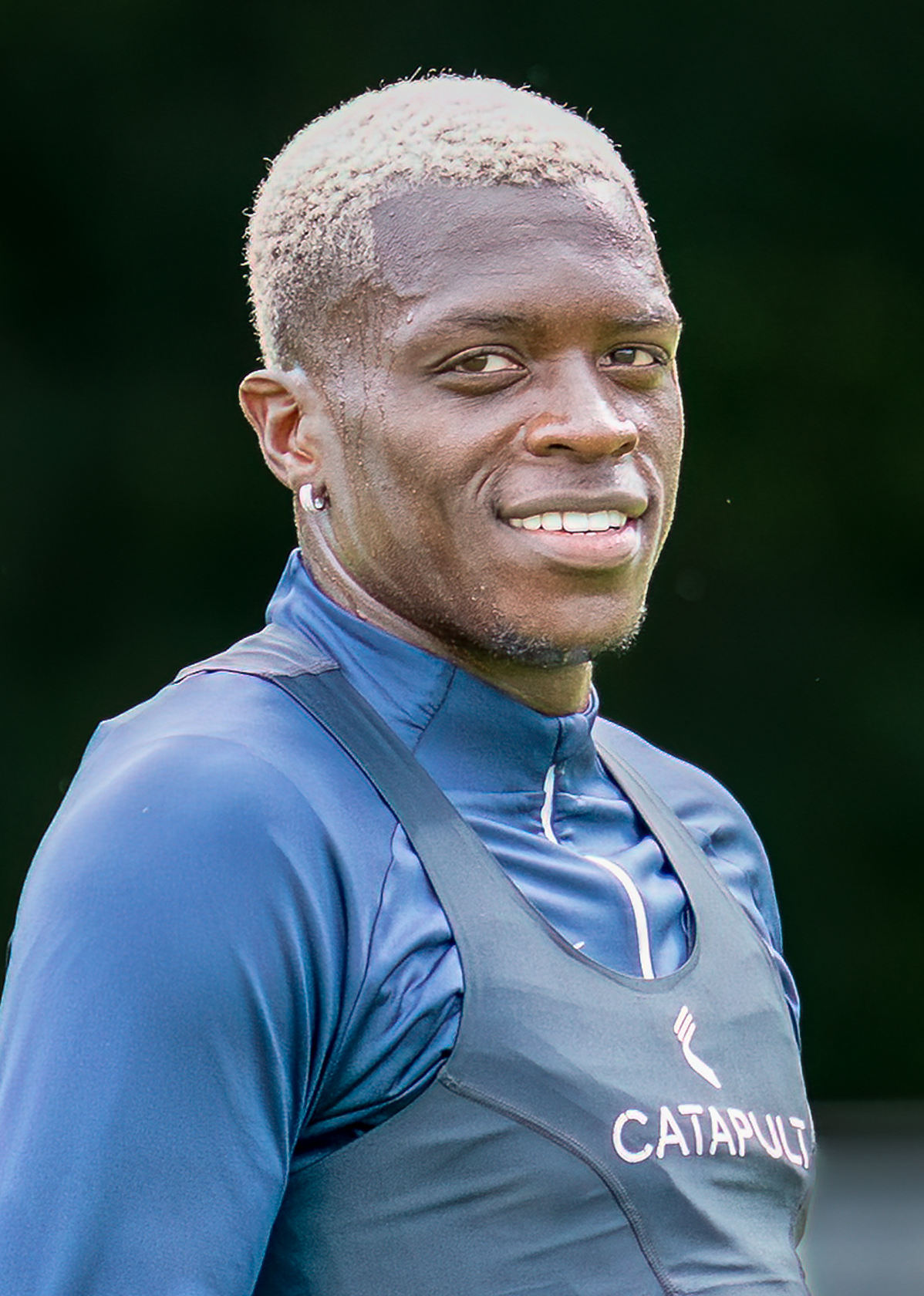
Joyskim Dawa won two consecutive Liga I titles with FCSB.

- Anatole Abang – Astra Giurgiu – 2017–2018
- Christ Afalna – Unirea Slobozia, FC Hermannstadt – 2024–2026
- Éric Aleokol – FC Universitatea Craiova – 2003–2004
- Mindourna Andela – Petrolul Ploiești – 1994–1995
- Steve Leo Beleck – CFR Cluj – 2015–2016
- Patrick Bengondo – FC Universitatea Craiova – 2003–2004
- Vincent Bikana – Petrolul Ploiești – 2011–2012
- Pierre Boya – Rapid București – 2007–2009
- Franck Cédric – FC Voluntari – 2015–2016
- Dani Chigou – Farul Constanța – 2007–2008
- **Joyskim Dawa** – FC Botoșani, **FCSB** – 2021–
- Danel Dongmo – Petrolul Ploiești – 2025–
- Pierre Ebéde – Astra Ploiești – 2010–2011
- Patrick Ekeng – Dinamo București – 2015–2016
- Lewis Enoh – Politehnica Iași – 2018–2019
- Devis Epassy – Dinamo București – 2025–
- Marcel Essombé – Dinamo București – 2015–2016
- Collins Fai – Dinamo București – 2013–2016
- Nana Falemi – Petrolul Ploiești, Steaua București, FC Vaslui, Gaz Metan Mediaș – 1997–2006, 2008–2009
- Patrice Feussi – ASA Târgu Mureș, Dinamo București, Concordia Chiajna – 2014–2018
- Arnold Garita – Argeș Pitești, FCSB – 2022–2023, 2026–
- Antonio Ghomsi – Dinamo București – 2015–2016
- Samuel Gouet – Politehnica Iași – 2024–2025
- Abdel Lamanje – Astra Giurgiu – 2020–2021
- Justin Mengolo – Universitatea Cluj, Astra Giurgiu – 2014–2015, 2018–2019
- Clinton N'Jie – Rapid București – 2024–
- Jérémie N'Jock – UTA Arad, FC Universitatea Craiova – 2002–2005, 2006–2007, 2008–2009
- Jean Christian N'Kongue – Oțelul Galați – 2009–2010
- Michael Ngadeu-Ngadjui – FC Botoșani – 2014–2016
- Bertrand Ngapounou – Oțelul Galați – 2007–2008
- Fabrice Olinga – FC Botoșani – 2023–2024
- Jérôme Onguéné – Petrolul Ploiești – 2025–2026
- Christian Pouga – FC Vaslui – 2010–2011
- Njongo Priso – Petrolul Ploiești – 2013–2015
- Edgar Salli – Sepsi Sfântu Gheorghe – 2019–2020
- James Léa Siliki – Gloria Buzău – 2024–2025
- Kallé Soné – Unirea Urziceni, CS Otopeni – 2006–2007, 2008–2009
- Kévin Soni – Rapid București – 2023–2024
- Robert Tambe – CFR Cluj – 2018–2019
- Franck Tchassem – Universitatea Cluj, Argeș Pitești – 2024–
- Jean Paul Yontcha – CS Otopeni – 2008–2009
- Jacques Zoua – Astra Giurgiu, Viitorul Constanța – 2018–2020

== Canada ==
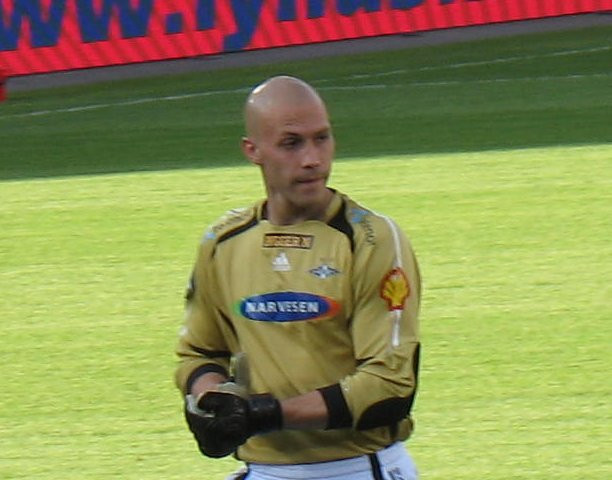
Lars Hirschfeld won a Liga I title with CFR Cluj.

- Zorhan Bassong – Argeș Pitești, Farul Constanța – 2022–2023
- Milan Borjan – FC Vaslui – 2011–2012
- Andrei Dumitru – FC Botoșani – 2025–2026
- Lars Hirschfeld – CFR Cluj – 2008–2009
- Easton Ongaro – UTA Arad – 2021–2022
- Tosaint Ricketts – Politehnica Timișoara – 2010–2011
- Dominick Zator – Oțelul Galați – 2026–

== Cape Verde ==
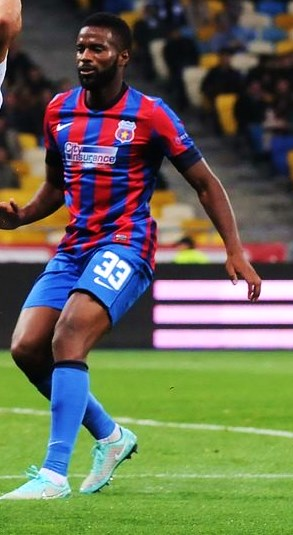
Fernando Varela won two Liga I titles with Steaua București and once the Liga I Foreign Player of the Year award.

- Tiago Almeida – Politehnica Iași, FC Hermannstadt – 2017–2018, 2019–2020
- Brito – Dinamo București – 2019–2020
- Rodny Cabral – Politehnica Iași – 2019–2021
- Bruno Carvalho – Metaloglobus București – 2025–2026
- Emerson da Luz – Gloria Bistrița – 2008–2009
- Hugo Évora – Ceahlăul Piatra Neamț – 2007–2008
- Ely Fernandes – Gaz Metan Mediaș, Viitorul Constanța, Farul Constanța, Universitatea Cluj, Metaloglobus București – 2017–2023, 2025–2026
- João Paulino Fernandes – Oțelul Galați – 2026–
- João Paulo Fernandes – Oțelul Galați, FCSB – 2025–
- Patrick Fernandes – Oțelul Galați – 2025–
- Carlos Fortes – Gaz Metan Mediaș, CS Universitatea Craiova – 2018–2020
- José Emílio Furtado – ACS Poli Timișoara – 2013–2014
- **Steve Furtado** – Farul Constanța – 2025–
- Kay – CS Universitatea Craiova – 2014–2017
- Mailson Lima – Viitorul Constanța – 2017–2019
- Félix Mathaus – Gaz Metan Mediaș, Petrolul Ploiești – 2021–2023
- Diogo Mendes – Rapid București – 2024–2025
- Pedro Moreira – Gloria Buzău – 2008–2009
- Néné – FC Brașov – 2009–2010
- Nivaldo – Concordia Chiajna – 2017–2019
- Hildeberto Pereira – Universitatea Cluj – 2024–2025
- Platini – Politehnica Iași – 2017–2021
- Rambé – CS Universitatea Craiova – 2016–2017
- Dany Mendes Ribeiro – Gloria Bistrița – 2008–2009
- Nuno Rocha – CS Universitatea Craiova – 2014–2017, 2018–2019
- Márcio Rosa – UTA Arad – 2026–
- Willy Semedo – Politehnica Iași – 2018–2019
- Marco Soares – Pandurii Târgu Jiu – 2007–2008
- Sténio – Politehnica Iași – 2016–2017
- David Tavares – Gloria Buzău – 2008–2009
- Hélder Tavares – Oțelul Galați, FC Voluntari – 2014–2015, 2020–2023
- Heriberto Tavares – CS Universitatea Craiova – 2026–
- Fernando Varela – FC Vaslui, Steaua București – 2012–2016
- Zé Rui – Gloria Bistrița – 2009–2010

== Central African Republic ==
- Manassé Enza-Yamissi – Petrolul Ploiești, Concordia Chiajna – 2012–2014, 2017–2018
- Habib Habibou – Steaua București, Politehnica Iași – 2007–2008, 2019–2020
- Fernander Kassaï – Gaz Metan Mediaș – 2020–2021
- Dylan Mboumbouni – CS Mioveni – 2022–2023

== Chad ==
- Sanaa Altama – Oțelul Galați, Petrolul Ploiești – 2014–2016

== Chile ==
- Nicolás Canales – CFR Cluj – 2007–2008
- Daúd Gazale – Oțelul Galați – 2012–2013
- Sebastián Páez – FC Brașov – 2011–2012
- Diego Rubio – Pandurii Târgu Jiu – 2013–2014
- Juan Toloza – FC Brașov – 2010–2012

== Colombia ==
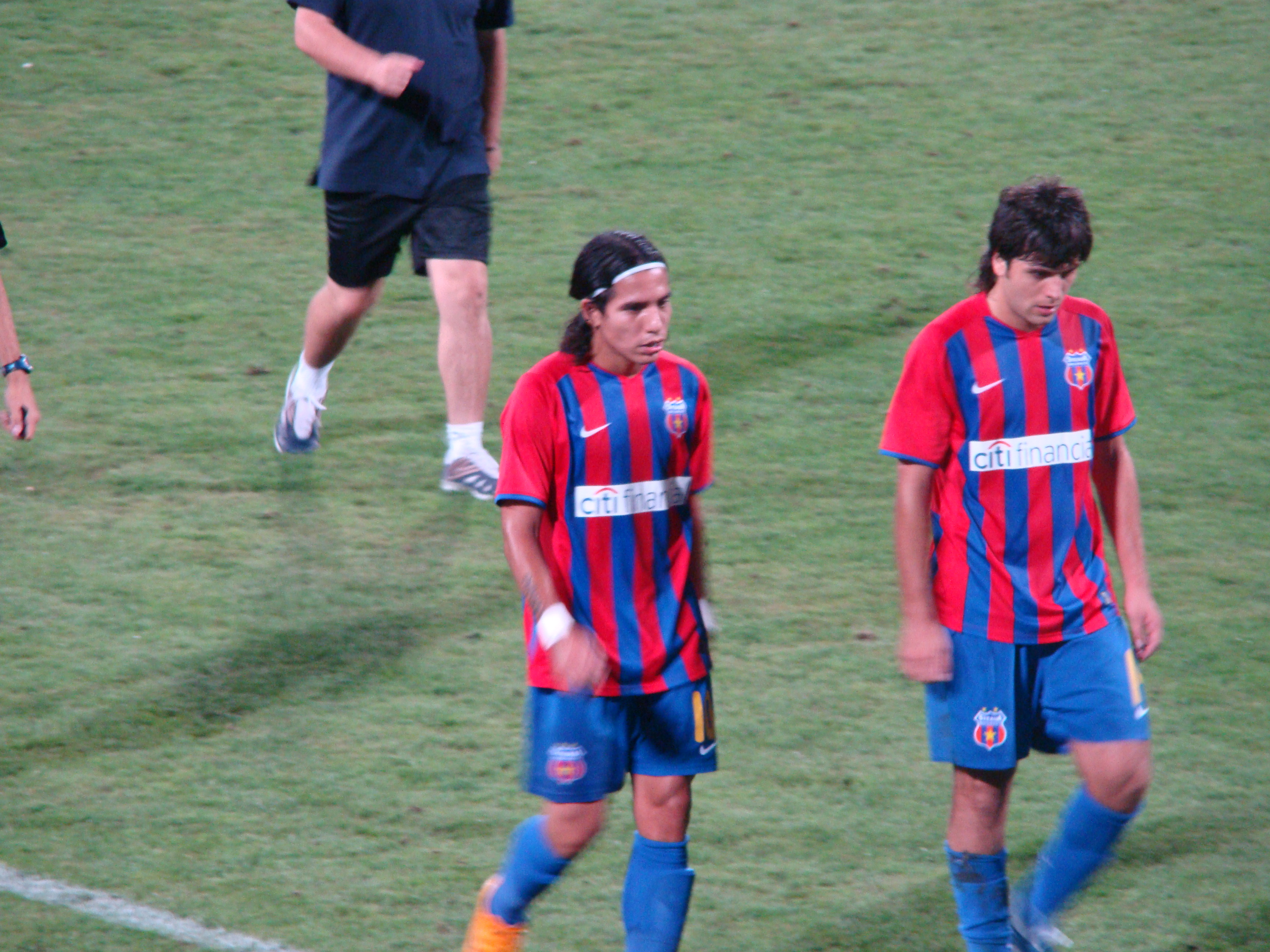
Dayro Moreno and Juan Toja played together for Steaua București.

- Óscar Arce – Corona Brașov – 2013–2014
- Julian Bonilla – Oțelul Galați – 2024–2026
- Mauricio Cuero – FC Vaslui – 2013–2014
- Cristian Mejía – Politehnica Timișoara – 2009–2010
- Dayro Moreno – Steaua București – 2007–2010
- Pepe Moreno – Steaua București – 2007–2008, 2009–2010
- Juan Toja – Steaua București – 2008–2010
- Brayan Torres – FC Botoșani – 2021–2022
- John Valencia – Oțelul Galați – 2005–2006
- Róbinson Zapata – Steaua București – 2007–2010

== Comoros ==
- Nasser Chamed – Gaz Metan Mediaș, Chindia Târgoviște – 2017–2023
- Kassim M'Dahoma – FC Botoșani – 2022–2023

== Congo ==
- Durel Avounou – CFR Cluj – 2023–2024
- Dylan Bahamboula – Astra Giurgiu – 2018–2019
- Gabriel Charpentier – Argeș Pitești – 2026–
- Armel Disney – Pandurii Târgu Jiu, Farul Constanța – 2005–2007
- Férébory Doré – Petrolul Ploiești, CFR Cluj – 2013–2015
- Hugo Konongo – Sepsi Sfântu Gheorghe – 2019–2020
- Kévin Koubemba – Argeș Pitești – 2022–2023
- Herman Moussaki – Petrolul Ploiești – 2024–2025
- Yves Pambou – Gaz Metan Mediaș – 2020–2021
- Yannick Salem – Concordia Chiajna – 2011–2012
- Ravy Tsouka – UTA Arad – 2024–2025
- Juvhel Tsoumou – FC Hermannstadt, FCSB, Viitorul Constanța, Rapid București – 2018–2021, 2023–2024

== Congo DR ==
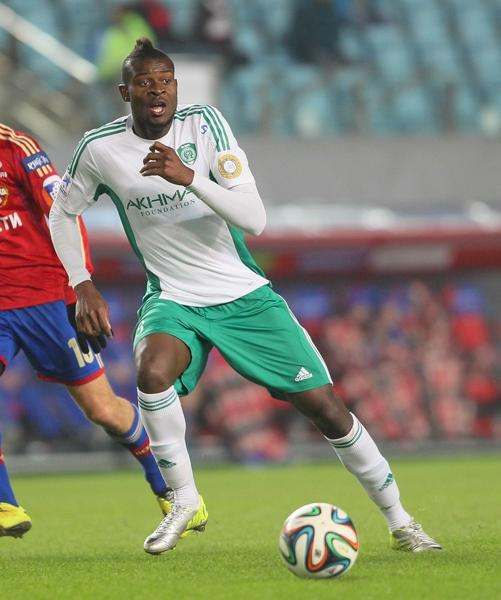
Jeremy Bokila had a prolific period in his single season at Petrolul Ploiești, scoring 16 goals in 32 games.

- Dylan Batubinsika – FCSB – 2026–
- Brian Bayeye – FC Botoșani – 2026–
- Jeremy Bokila – Petrolul Ploiești, CFR Cluj, Dinamo București – 2012–2013, 2017–2018
- Mike Cestor – Astra Giurgiu, CFR Cluj, Argeș Pitești, Gloria Buzău, Metaloglobus București – 2018–2023, 2024–2026
- Rodrigue Dikaba – Ceahlăul Piatra Neamț – 2009–2010
- Jordan Ikoko – Dinamo București – 2025–2026
- Junior Kabananga – CS Mioveni – 2022–2023
- Hervé Kage – FC Botoșani – 2021–2022
- Patrick Kanyuka – Unirea Alba Iulia – 2009–2010
- Yann Kitala – Farul Constanța – 2026–
- Paul-José M'Poku – UTA Arad – 2024–2025
- Yves Ma-Kalambay – Oțelul Galați – 2014–2015
- Breston Malula – Petrolul Ploiești – 2026–
- Parfait Mandanda – Dinamo București – 2018–2019
- Harrison Manzala – Petrolul Ploiești – 2022–2023
- Junior Mapuku – Dunărea Călărași – 2018–2019
- Ewango Metre – FC Universitatea Craiova – 2002–2003
- Wilfred Moke – FC Voluntari, Steaua București – 2015–2017
- Filston Mongu-Nkoy – FC Universitatea Craiova – 2004–2005
- Camille Muzinga – Rapid București – 2002–2003
- Aristote N'Dongala – Academica Clinceni – 2019–2020
- Patrick N'Koyi – Petrolul Ploiești – 2014–2015
- Jordan Nkololo – FC Hermannstadt – 2018–2019
- Marlin Piana – Oțelul Galați – 2003–2004
- Maxime Sivis – Dinamo București – 2024–2027

== Costa Rica ==
- Alejandro Bran – Petrolul Ploiești – 2026–
- Dylan Flores – Politehnica Iași, Sepsi Sfântu Gheorghe – 2018–2021
- **Carlos Mora** – **CS Universitatea Craiova** – 2024–
- Winston Parks – Politehnica Timișoara – 2008–2010
- Deyver Vega – Politehnica Iași – 2020–2021

== Croatia ==
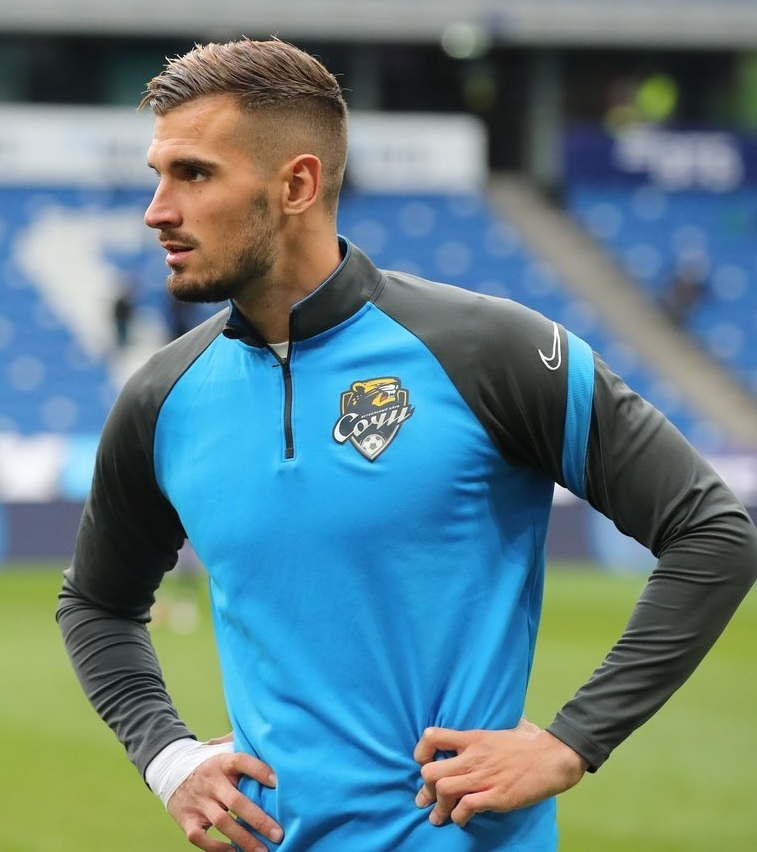
With 22 goals scored for Rapid București, Marko Dugandžić was the top-scorer of the 2022–23 Liga I season.

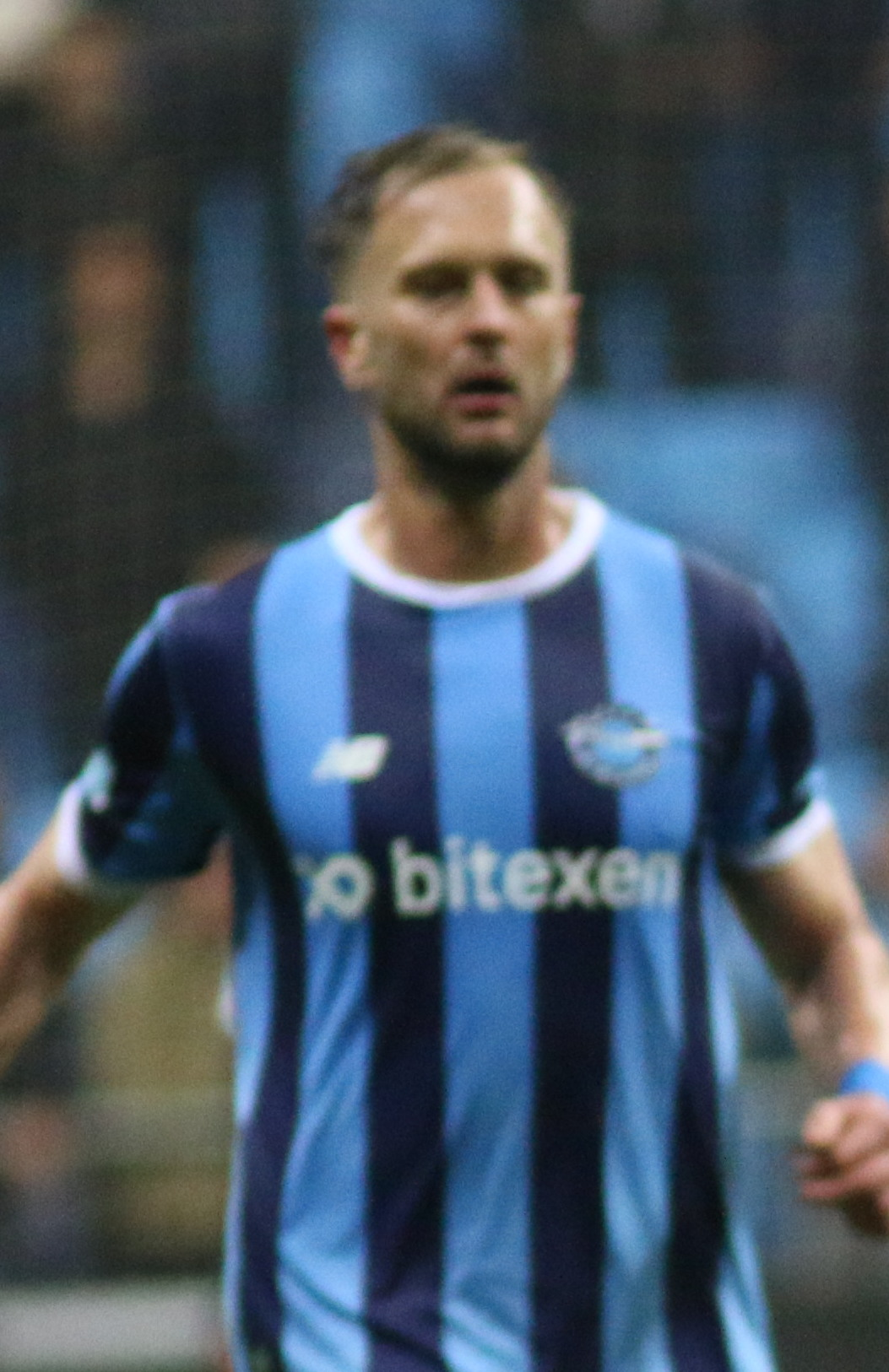
Damjan Đoković played for CFR Cluj in three different periods, winning four Liga I titles, and also winning another one with FCSB.

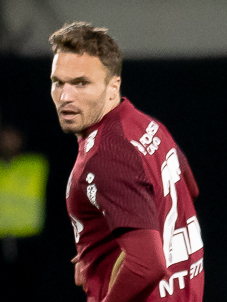
Gabriel Debeljuh won two Liga I titles with CFR Cluj.

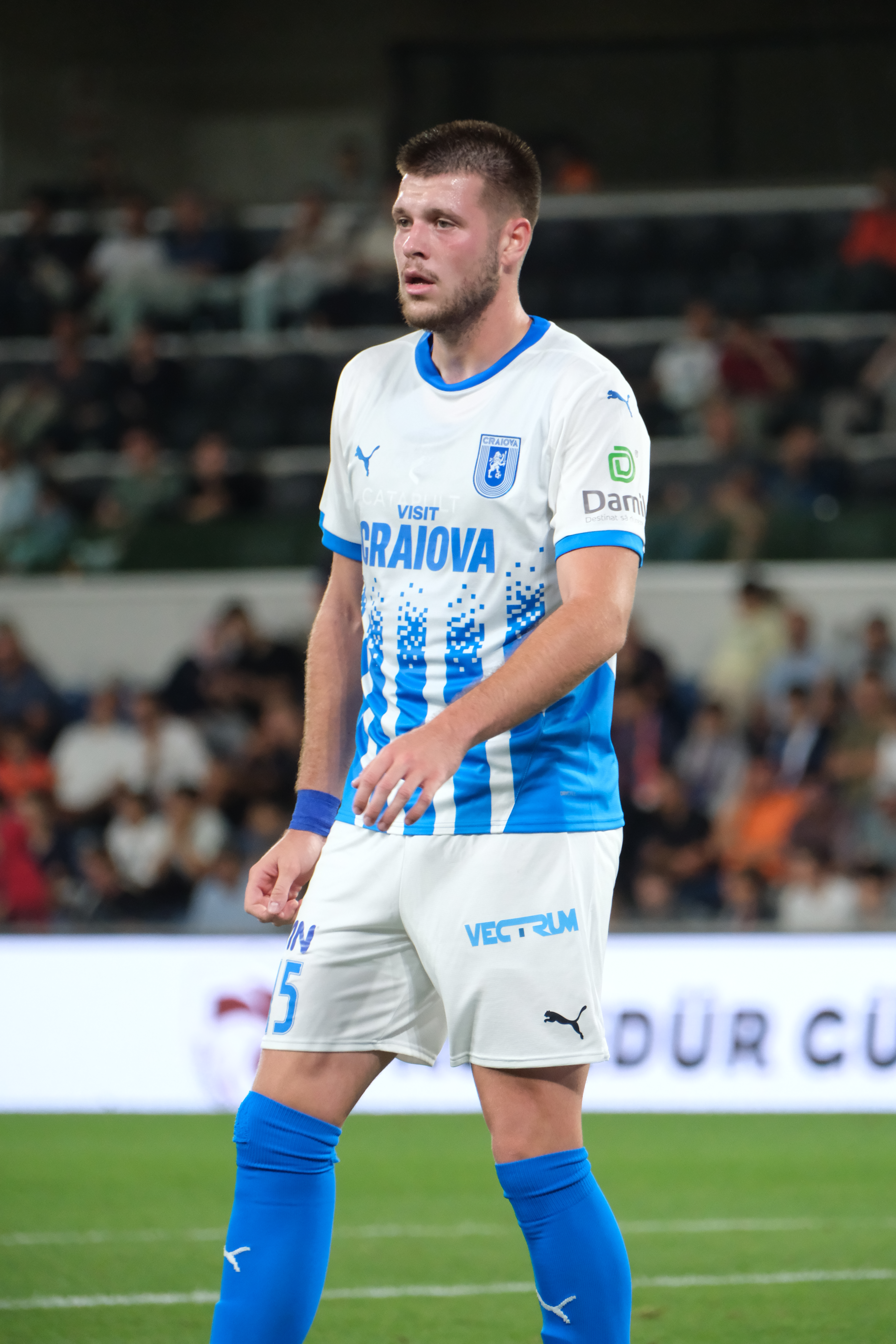
Juraj Badelj won the Liga I title with CS Universitatea Craiova.

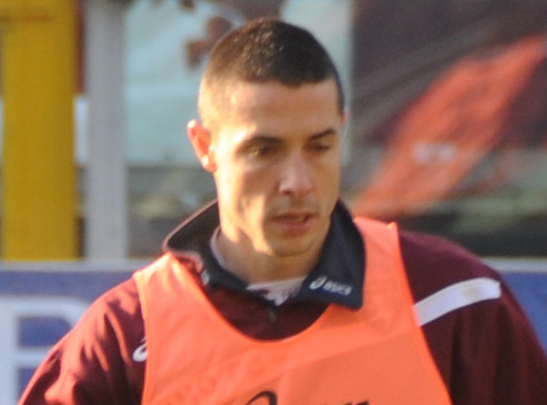
International Saša Bjelanović played for CFR Cluj during two separate stints.

- Adnan Aganović – FC Brașov, Viitorul Constanța, Steaua București, Sepsi Sfântu Gheorghe, Unirea Slobozia – 2013–2017, 2020–2026
- Muhamed Alghoul – Academica Clinceni – 2021–2022
- Ante Aralica – FC Hermannstadt – 2020–2021
- Antonio Asanović – CS Turnu Severin, Dinamo București, Corona Brașov – 2012–2014
- Matko Babić – FC Hermannstadt, FC Voluntari – 2022–2023, 2026–
- Stjepan Babić – Concordia Chiajna – 2017–2018
- Juraj Badelj – CS Universitatea Craiova – 2022–2027
- Dražen Bagarić – FC Hermannstadt – 2020–2021
- Matej Bagarić – Concordia Chiajna – 2014–2015
- Hrvoje Barišić – Sepsi Sfântu Gheorghe – 2019–2020
- Marko Bencun – FC Brașov – 2014–2015
- Saša Bjelanović – CFR Cluj – 2010–2011, 2012–2013
- Jakov Blagaić – Argeș Pitești – 2025–2026
- Josip Bonacin – Unirea Alba Iulia – 2009–2010
- Antonio Bosec – CFR Cluj – 2025–2026
- Marko Brekalo – FC Botoșani – 2018–2019
- Mario Brlečić – Concordia Chiajna – 2014–2015
- Karlo Bručić – CFR Cluj – 2022–2023
- Vinko Buden – Ceahlăul Piatra Neamț – 2014–2015
- Dario Čanađija – Astra Giurgiu, Gloria Buzău – 2020–2021, 2024–2025
- Maks Čelić – Csíkszereda – 2025–2026
- Ferante Colnago – Rapid București – 1932–1938
- Ljuban Crepulja – Astra Giurgiu, Rapid București, FC Voluntari – 2019–2024
- Ivan Ćurjurić – ACS Poli Timișoara – 2017–2018
- Lovro Cvek – CFR Cluj, FC Voluntari – 2021–2024, 2026–
- Filip Dangubić – Chindia Târgoviște, UTA Arad – 2019–2020, 2021–2022
- Niko Datković – CS Universitatea Craiova – 2017–2018
- Gabriel Debeljuh – FC Hermannstadt, CFR Cluj, Sepsi Sfântu Gheorghe, Oțelul Galați – 2019–2026
- Damjan Đoković – CFR Cluj, FCSB, Rapid București – 2013–2014, 2017–2021, 2023–2027
- Marko Dugandžić – FC Botoșani, CFR Cluj, Rapid București – 2019–2024
- Josip Fuček – ACS Poli Timișoara – 2016–2017
- Dominik Glavina – CS Universitatea Craiova – 2017–2019
- Tomislav Gomelt – CFR Cluj, Dinamo București – 2015–2017, 2018–2019
- Toni Gorupec – Astra Giurgiu – 2014–2015
- Miroslav Iličić – FC Botoșani – 2023–2024
- Kristijan Ipša – Petrolul Ploiești – 2014–2015
- Josip Ivančić – Chindia Târgoviște – 2019–2020
- Antonio Jakoliš – CFR Cluj, FCSB, Argeș Pitești – 2014–2017, 2018–2019, 2022–2023
- Filip Jazvić – CFR Cluj, ASA Târgu Mureș, CS Universitatea Craiova, FC Hermannstadt – 2014–2017, 2018–2019
- Igor Jovanović – Sepsi Sfântu Gheorghe, Astra Giurgiu, Dinamo București – 2018–2019, 2020–2022
- Tomislav Jurić – FC Brașov – 2014–2015
- Matija Katanec – Politehnica Iași – 2023–2024
- Ivan Kelava – Politehnica Iași – 2017–2018
- Renato Kelić – CS Universitatea Craiova – 2016–2020
- Mihovil Klapan – UTA Arad – 2020–2021
- Denis Kolinger – CFR Cluj – 2022–2023
- Dominik Kovačić – FC U Craiova – 2021–2022
- Anton Krešić – CFR Cluj – 2023–
- Mislav Leko – FC Brașov – 2013–2015
- Ivan Lendrić – FC Hermannstadt – 2018–2019
- Karlo Letica – CFR Cluj, FC Hermannstadt – 2021–2024
- Goran Ljubojević – FCM Târgu Mureș – 2011–2012
- Filip Lončarić – Gaz Metan Mediaș – 2012–2013
- Dragan Lovrić – Oțelul Galați, Gloria Buzău – 2023–2025
- Anton Maglica – CFR Cluj – 2022–2023
- Mate Maleš – CFR Cluj – 2018–2019
- Matej Mamić – FC Voluntari – 2026–
- Petar Mamić – CFR Cluj – 2023–2024
- Ivan Mamut – CS Universitatea Craiova, FCSB – 2020–2023
- Luka Marić – Dinamo București, Argeș Pitești – 2016–2018, 2020–2021
- Vinko Međimorec – UTA Arad – 2021–2022
- Dino Mikanović – Universitatea Cluj – 2025–
- Robert Mišković – Politehnica Iași – 2024–2025
- Filip Mrzljak – Pandurii Târgu Jiu, Astra Giurgiu, Dinamo București – 2014–2020
- Karlo Muhar – CFR Cluj, FCSB – 2022–
- Leopold Novak – FC Brașov, ACS Poli Timișoara – 2014–2015, 2016–2017
- Saša Novaković – FC Brașov, FC Voluntari – 2014–2016
- Jure Obšivač – Sepsi Sfântu Gheorghe – 2017–2018
- Antun Palić – Dinamo București, Argeș Pitești – 2015–2018, 2020–2022
- Renato Pantalon – CFR Cluj – 2026–
- Domagoj Pavičić – Dinamo București – 2023–2024
- Stipe Perica – Dinamo București – 2024–
- Ivan Pešić – Dinamo București, FC Voluntari – 2017–2019, 2020–2021
- Stipe Plazibat – Academica Clinceni – 2021–2022
- Stjepan Plazonja – FC Hermannstadt – 2019–2020
- Mateo Poljak – Astra Giurgiu – 2017–2018
- Igor Prahić – FC Vaslui – 2013–2014
- Franjo Prce – Petrolul Ploiești – 2025–2026
- Ante Puljić – Dinamo București – 2015–2016, 2019–2021
- Ante Roguljić – CS Universitatea Craiova, Universitatea Cluj – 2021–2024
- Dario Rugašević – Gaz Metan Mediaș – 2016–2017
- Ante Sarić – Politehnica Iași – 2015–2017
- Matej Šimić – Sepsi Sfântu Gheorghe – 2024–2025
- Dino Skorup – Sepsi Sfântu Gheorghe – 2024–2025
- Dino Škvorc – Universitatea Cluj – 2014–2015
- Matija Smrekar – Pandurii Târgu Jiu – 2014–2015
- Josip Šoljić – ACS Poli Timișoara – 2016–2018
- Tomislav Šorša – CFR Cluj – 2016–2017
- Hrvoje Spahija – FC Voluntari, CS Universitatea Craiova – 2015–2018
- Dino Špehar – Concordia Chiajna – 2017–2018
- Marko Stolnik – UTA Arad – 2023–2024, 2025–2026
- Josip Tomašević – Oțelul Galați – 2024–2025
- Oliver Tole – CS Turnu Severin – 2012–2013
- Frane Vitaić – Oțelul Galați – 2008–2009
- Aljoša Vojnović – Dinamo București – 2015–2016
- Ante Vukušić – FCSB – 2020–2021
- Mario Vrdoljak – Academica Clinceni – 2021–2022
- Filip Žderić – Gaz Metan Mediaș – 2017–2018
- Josip Zeba – Concordia Chiajna – 2017–2018
- Mario Zebić – Argeș Pitești – 2022–2023
- Ivan Zgrablić – FC Voluntari – 2018–2019
- Diego Živulić – Oțelul Galați – 2023–2026
- Ivica Žunić – CFR Cluj – 2020–2021

== Cuba ==
- Luis Paradela – CS Universitatea Craiova – 2024–2026

== Curaçao ==
- Jafar Arias – Argeș Pitești – 2021–2022
- Rangelo Janga – CFR Cluj – 2022–2023
- Quenten Martinus – FC Botoșani – 2014–2016
- Rihairo Meulens – Rapid București – 2014–2015
- Gevaro Nepomuceno – Petrolul Ploiești, Dinamo București – 2014–2016, 2020–2021
- Everon Pisas – ACS Poli Timișoara – 2015–2016
- Prince Rajcomar – ACS Poli Timișoara – 2015–2016
- Godfried Roemeratoe – FC Voluntari – 2026–

== Cyprus ==
- Evagoras Antoniou – Argeș Pitești – 2026–
- Elias Charalambous – FC Vaslui – 2012–2013
- Paraskevas Christou – Universitatea Cluj, Pandurii Târgu Jiu – 2012–2015
- Andreas Karo – FC Hermannstadt – 2025–2026
- Charalampos Kyriakou – Dinamo București – 2025–2026
- Vincent Laban – Astra Giurgiu – 2013–2015
- Marcos Michael – Petrolul Ploiești – 2015–2016
- Neofytos Michail – Universitatea Cluj – 2026–
- Urko Pardo – Rapid București – 2008–2009
- Stelios Parpas – Steaua București – 2009–2010
- Athos Solomou – Oțelul Galați – 2014–2015
- Marinos Tzionis – UTA Arad – 2024–

== Czech Republic ==
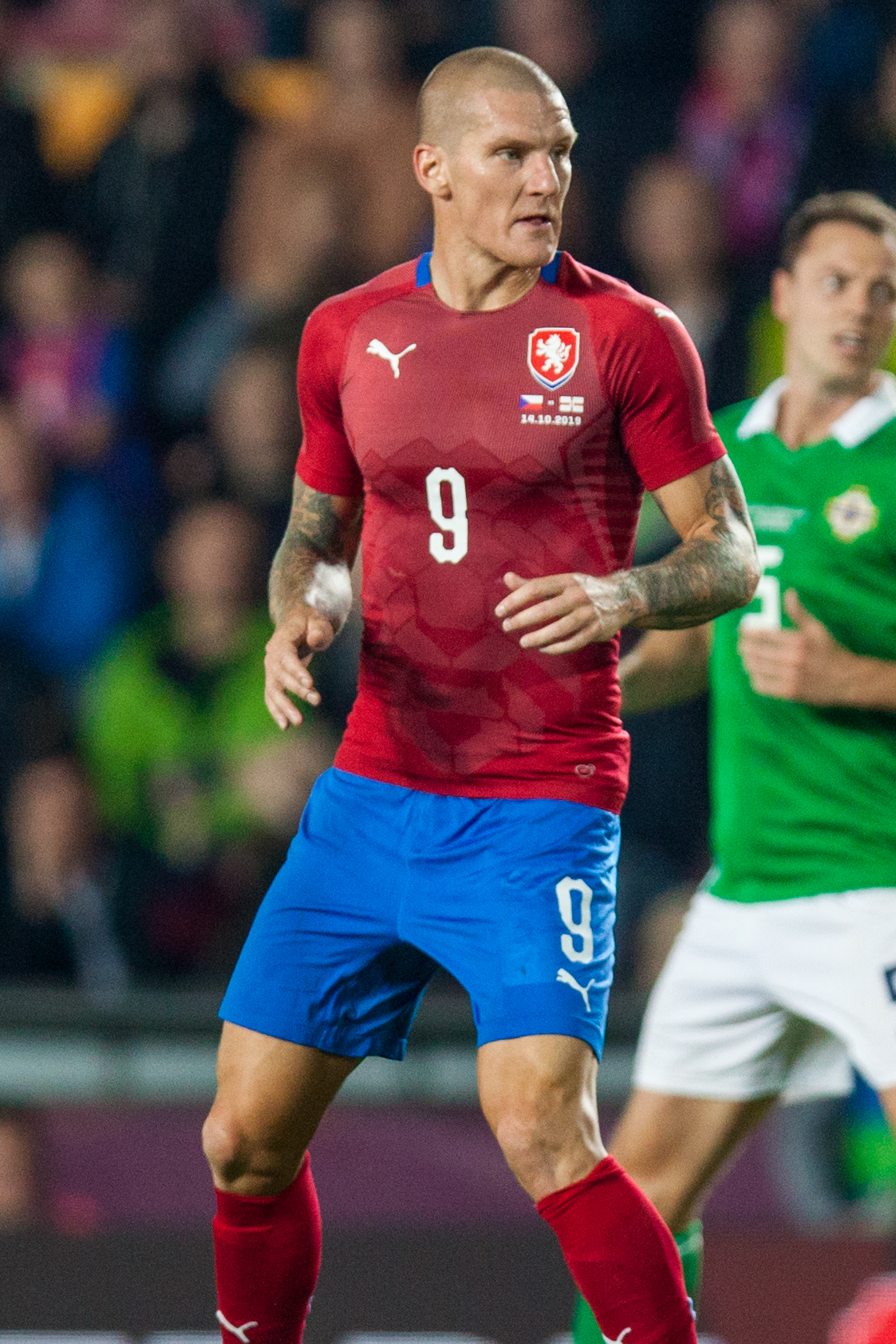
Zdeněk Ondrášek had a short stint in Liga I with FCSB.

- Ondřej Bačo – Gaz Metan Mediaș – 2020–2021
- Miloš Buchta – Gaz Metan Mediaș, Rapid București – 2009–2015
- Martin Černoch – Politehnica Iași, Ceahlăul Piatra Neamț – 2005–2008
- Pavel Čmovš – Rapid București, Academica Clinceni – 2014–2015, 2021–2022
- Lukáš Droppa – Pandurii Târgu Jiu, Gaz Metan Mediaș, FC Voluntari – 2015–2016, 2019–2024
- Marcel Gecov – Rapid București – 2014–2015
- Martin Jícha – Ceahlăul Piatra Neamț – 2013–2014
- Tomáš Josl – Rapid București – 2014–2015
- Karel Kratochvíl – Gaz Metan Mediaș – 2009–2010
- Petr Mach – Gaz Metan Mediaș – 2013–2014
- Lukáš Magera – Politehnica Timișoara – 2008–2011
- Zdeněk Ondrášek – FCSB – 2021–2022
- Radek Opršal – Național București, Astra Ploiești – 2006–2007, 2009–2012
- Emil Rilke – Universitatea Cluj – 2013–2014
- Tomáš Smola – Gaz Metan Mediaș – 2020–2022
- Tomáš Wágner – UTA Arad – 2021–2022
- **Lukáš Zima** – Petrolul Ploiești, FCSB – 2023–
- Martin Živný – Dinamo București – 2009–2010

== Denmark ==
- Vito Hammershøy-Mistrati – CFR Cluj – 2022–2023
- Frederik Holst – UTA Arad – 2023–2024
- Patrick Olsen – Dinamo București – 2024–2025
- Thomas Juel-Nielsen – Gaz Metan Mediaș – 2019–2020
- Youssef Toutouh – FC Botoșani – 2020–2021
- Thomas Villadsen – Ceahlăul Piatra Neamț – 2009–2010, 2011–2012

== Djibouti ==
- Ismail Hassan – Petrolul Ploiești – 2015–2016

== Ecuador ==
- Stiven Plaza – Oțelul Galați – 2024–2025

== Egypt ==
- Tarek Amer – Gloria Buzău – 2008–2009

== El Salvador ==
- Nelson Bonilla – Viitorul Constanța – 2014–2015

== England ==
- Mark Burke – Rapid București – 2001–2002
- Shayon Harrison – Politehnica Iași, UTA Arad – 2023–2025
- Ross Jenkins – ACS Poli Timișoara – 2015–2016
- Wilson Kneeshaw – ACS Poli Timișoara – 2013–2014
- Jeffrey Monakana – FC Voluntari – 2015–2016
- Jordan Mustoe – Dinamo București – 2018–2019
- Dan Nlundulu – Petrolul Ploiești – 2026–
- Jordan Robertson – Gaz Metan Mediaș – 2013–2014

== Equatorial Guinea ==
- Rodolfo Bodipo – FC Vaslui – 2010–2011
- Basilio Ndong – CS Universitatea Craiova – 2022–2026
- Esteban Obiang – Chindia Târgoviște, Argeș Pitești, Unirea Slobozia – 2022–2023, 2025–2026
- Sipo – Pandurii Târgu Jiu – 2013–2014

== Eritrea ==
- Oliver Hintsa – Dinamo București – 2026–

== Estonia ==
- Ilja Antonov – FC Hermannstadt – 2018–2019
- Artjom Artjunin – FC Brașov – 2014–2015
- Vitali Gussev – Astra Ploiești – 2009–2010
- Mattias Käit – Rapid București – 2021–2025
- Brent Lepistu – CS Mioveni – 2022–2023
- Sergei Lepmets – Concordia Chiajna, Ceahlăul Piatra Neamț – 2012–2013
- Eino Puri – FC Botoșani – 2013–2014
- Eduard Ratnikov – Oțelul Galați – 2007–2008
- Joonas Tamm – FCSB – 2022–2023

== Faroe Islands ==
- Kaj Leo í Bartalsstovu – Dinamo București – 2015–2016

== Finland ==
- Vahid Hambo – Astra Giurgiu – 2018–2020
- Tommi Jyry – Petrolul Ploiești – 2023–2026
- Pyry Soiri – CS Universitatea Craiova – 2023–2024

== France ==
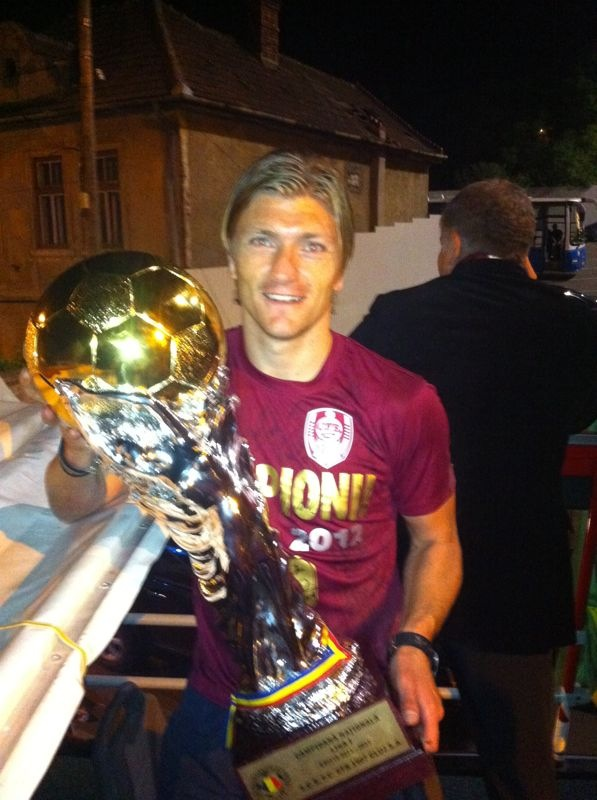
Nicolas Godemèche is pictured with the 2011–12 Liga I trophy.

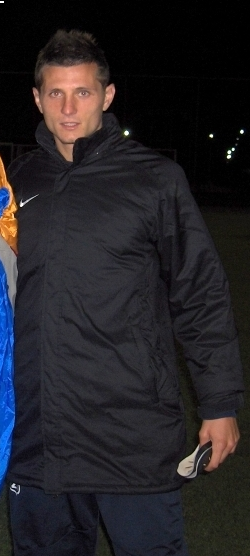
Cyril Théréau scored 10 goals for Steaua București in his single Liga I season.

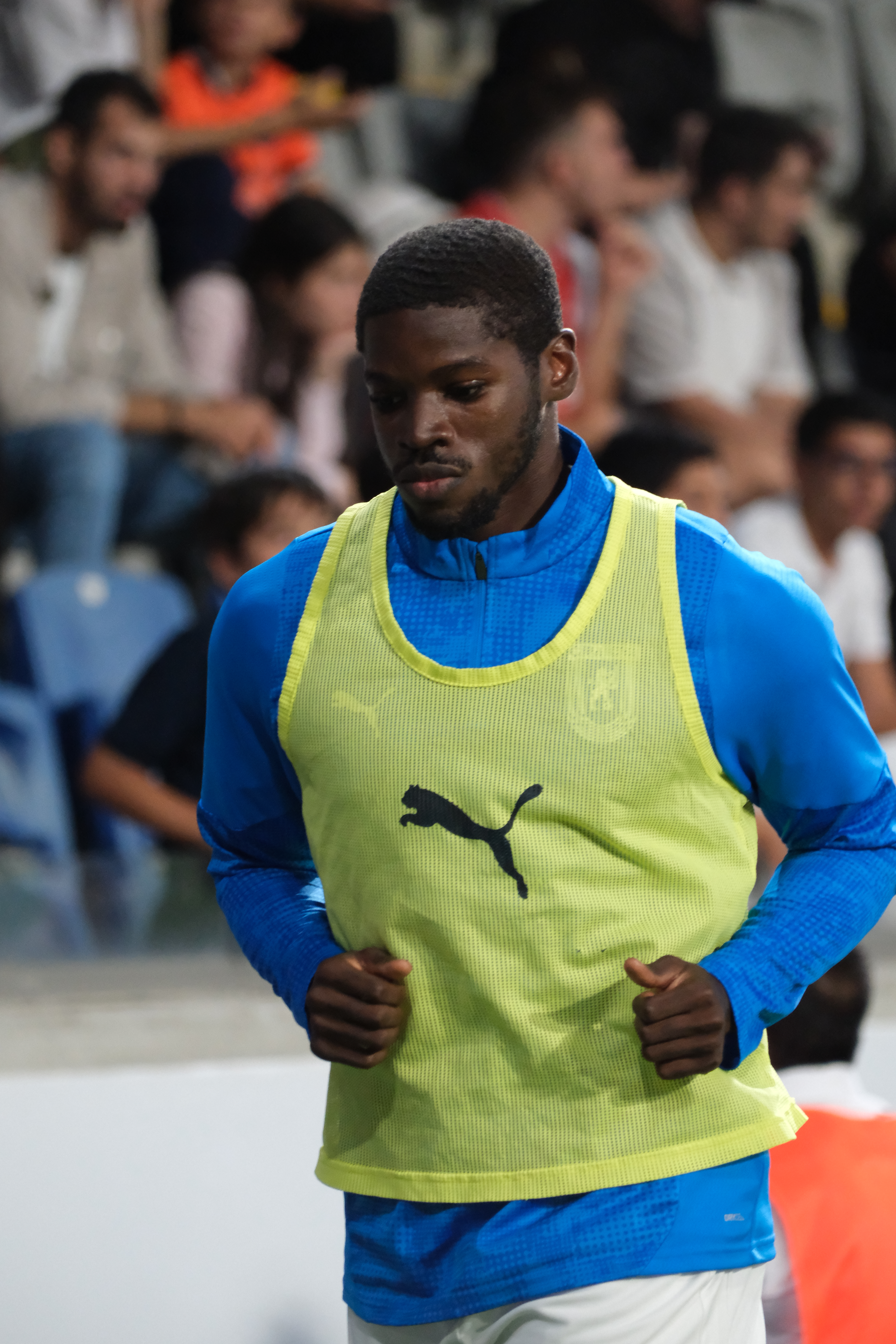
Steven Nsimba won the Liga I title with CS Universitatea Craiova.

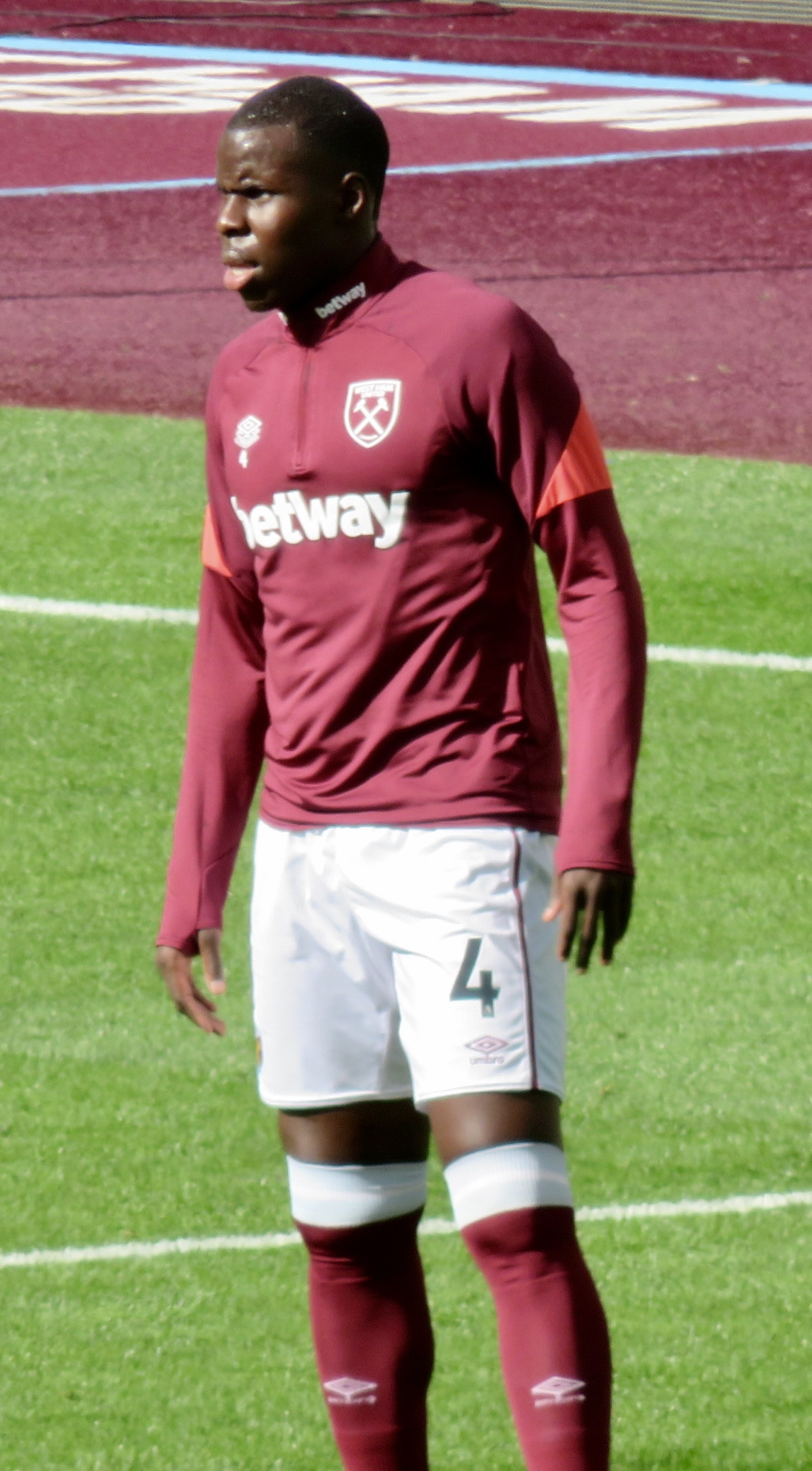
International Kurt Zouma had a short stint in Liga I with CFR Cluj

- Nabil Aberdin – Farul Constanța – 2026–
- Tarek Aggoun – Metaloglobus București – 2025–2026
- Baptiste Aloé – Dinamo București – 2021–2022
- Florent André – ASA Târgu Mureș – 2016–2017
- Yassine Bahassa – FC U Craiova – 2022–2024
- Antoine Baroan – Rapid București – 2025–2026
- Alexandre Barthe – CS Universitatea Craiova – 2016–2018
- Fabrice Begeorgi – Petrolul Ploiești – 2015–2016
- Julien Bègue – Astra Giurgiu – 2018–2020
- Abdelhak Belahmeur – FC Voluntari – 2018–2020
- Quentin Bena – Dinamo București – 2023–2024
- Adel Bettaieb – Politehnica Iași, Universitatea Cluj, Argeș Pitești – 2023–2026
- Yann Boé-Kane – Astra Giurgiu – 2020–2021
- Fabien Boudarène – Universitatea Cluj – 2007–2008
- Damien Boudjemaa – Petrolul Ploiești, Astra Giurgiu – 2011–2014, 2015–2017
- Jean-Bryan Boukaka – Rapid București – 2014–2015
- Karim Boutadjine – Pandurii Târgu Jiu, Universitatea Cluj – 2012–2015
- Sofyane Bouzamoucha – Farul Constanța – 2026–
- Aboubacar Camara – Metaloglobus București – 2025–2026
- Enzo Célestine – Argeș Pitești – 2022–2023
- Thomas Chesneau – Dinamo București – 2021–2022
- Sacha Clémence – Dunărea Călărași – 2018–2019
- Victor Daguin – Sepsi Sfântu Gheorghe – 2026–
- Maurice Dalé – Unirea Urziceni – 2010–2011
- Sylvain Deslandes – Argeș Pitești – 2020–2021
- Adama Diakhaby – Politehnica Iași – 2024–2025
- Mickaël Diakota – Gaz Metan Mediaș – 2019–2020
- Bradley Diallo – Gaz Metan Mediaș, Politehnica Iași, Chindia Târgoviște, FC U Craiova – 2018–2020, 2021–2022
- Mamadou Diarra – FC Botoșani – 2026–
- Claude Dielna – Dinamo București, CS Universitatea Craiova – 2016–2017, 2019–2020
- Brahima Doukansy – Petrolul Ploiești – 2025–2026
- Alexandre Durimel – CS Turnu Severin, Dinamo București – 2012–2015
- Malcom Edjouma – Viitorul Constanța, FC Botoșani, FCSB – 2019–2020, 2021–2026
- Simon Elisor – CS Universitatea Craiova – 2026–
- Michel Espinosa – Dinamo București – 2021–2022
- Jean-Alain Fanchone – Petrolul Ploiești – 2014–2015
- Nicolas Farina – Petrolul Ploiești – 2015–2016
- Jérémy Faug-Porret – FC Botoșani, Petrolul Ploiești – 2014–2016
- Fabrice Fernandes – Dinamo București – 2006–2008
- Jordan Gele – Unirea Slobozia, FCSB – 2024–2025
- Lamine Ghezali – Dinamo București, UTA Arad – 2023–2025
- Eddy Gnahoré – Dinamo București, FCSB – 2023–
- Harlem Gnohéré – Dinamo București, FCSB – 2015–2020
- Nicolas Godemèche – CFR Cluj – 2011–2013
- Steven Goma – Academica Clinceni – 2021–2022
- Hérold Goulon – Viitorul Constanța – 2015–2016
- Elliot Grandin – Astra Giurgiu – 2014–2015
- Ludovic Guerriero – Petrolul Ploiești – 2015–2016
- Kevin Hatchi – Astra Ploiești – 2009–2010
- Lyes Houri – Viitorul Constanța, CS Universitatea Craiova – 2018–2020, 2021–2022, 2023–2026
- Jules Iloki – Concordia Chiajna – 2018–2019
- Romain Inez – Petrolul Ploiești – 2015–2016
- Bruce Inkango – Oțelul Galați – 2012–2013
- Bernard Itoua – Gaz Metan Mediaș – 2016–2017
- Ismaël Kanda – Gaz Metan Mediaș – 2021–2022
- Lossémy Karaboué – FC Botoșani – 2018–2019
- Mamoudou Karamoko – Dinamo București – 2025–
- Setigui Karamoko – Sepsi Sfântu Gheorghe – 2026–
- Tidiane Keita – Petrolul Ploiești, CFR Cluj – 2024–2026
- Hamidou Keyta – Dunărea Călărași, Viitorul Constanța, FC Botoșani – 2018–2021
- Anthony Le Tallec – Astra Giurgiu – 2017–2018
- Taylor Luvambo – Argeș Pitești – 2026–
- Robert Maah – CFR Cluj – 2012–2014
- Younes Marzouk – Rapid București – 2021–2022
- Nasser Menassel – CS Otopeni, Internațional Curtea de Argeș, Pandurii Târgu Jiu, Universitatea Cluj, FC Brașov – 2008–2013
- Jean-Philippe Mendy – Dinamo București – 2006–2007, 2008–2009
- Oucasse Mendy – Universitatea Cluj – 2025–
- Xavier Méride – Dinamo București – 2003–2004
- Teddy Mézague – Dinamo București – 2018–2019
- Martin Mimoun – Politehnica Iași – 2018–2019
- Jaly Mouaddib – FC Botoșani – 2023–2025
- Thibault Moulin – Academica Clinceni – 2020–2022
- Gabriel Mutombo – FC Botoșani – 2022–2024
- Daudet N'Dongala – Politehnica Iași – 2018–2019
- Kablan N'Goma – FC Botoșani, FC Hermannstadt – 2023–2024
- Aly Ndom – Chindia Târgoviște – 2022–2023
- Tony Njiké – Argeș Pitești, Farul Constanța – 2022–2023, 2026–
- Béni Nkololo – CFR Cluj – 2024–2026
- Bryan Nouvier – CFR Cluj, Sepsi Sfântu Gheorghe – 2015–2019, 2020–2021
- Philippe Nsiah – Academica Clinceni – 2019–2020
- Steven Nsimba – CS Universitatea Craiova – 2025–
- Roy Odiaka – Universitatea Cluj – 2013–2014
- Abdelhakim Omrani – Dunărea Călărași – 2018–2019
- **Hervin Ongenda** – **FC Botoșani**, Rapid București – 2018–
- Peter Ouaneh – UTA Arad – 2026–
- Jayson Papeau – Rapid București, Unirea Slobozia, UTA Arad – 2022–
- Romuald Peiser – Rapid București – 2003–2004
- Steven Pelé – Universitatea Cluj – 2010–2012
- **Lucas Pellegrini** – Farul Constanța – 2025–
- Michaël Pereira – CFR Cluj – 2019–2021
- Balthazar Pierret – Dinamo București – 2021–2022
- Virgile Pinson – FC Botoșani – 2022–2024
- Grégoire Puel – FC Voluntari – 2020–2021
- Réda Rabeï – SC Juventus București – 2017–2018
- Guillaume Rippert – Petrolul Ploiești – 2015–2016
- Baptiste Roux – CS Universitatea Craiova – 2026–
- Jérémy Sapina – Rapid București – 2014–2015
- Florent Sauvadet – Petrolul Ploiești, Universitatea Cluj – 2012–2015
- Billal Sebaihi – FC Hermannstadt – 2020–2021
- Richard Sila – FC Botoșani, Chindia Târgoviște – 2021–2022
- Mohamadou Sissoko – Oțelul Galați – 2014–2015
- Aymen Souda – Dunărea Călărași – 2018–2019
- Eddy Sylvestre – Farul Constanța – 2026–
- Grégory Tadé – CFR Cluj, Steaua București – 2013–2016
- Aziz Tafer – Gloria Buzău – 2008–2009
- Cyril Théréau – Steaua București – 2006–2007
- Steven Thicot – Dinamo București – 2013–2014
- Joël Thomas – CS Turnu Severin, Dinamo București – 2012–2014
- Oumare Tounkara – Astra Giurgiu – 2019–2020
- Alassane Touré – Astra Giurgiu – 2014–2015
- Martins Toutou – Metaloglobus București – 2025–2026
- Stéphane Tritz – Oțelul Galați – 2013–2014
- Karim Yoda – Astra Giurgiu – 2013–2014
- Cyril Zabou – FC Botoșani – 2022–2024
- Abdellah Zoubir – Petrolul Ploiești – 2015–2016
- Kurt Zouma – CFR Cluj – 2025–2026

== French Guiana ==
- Kévin Rimane – FC Hermannstadt – 2019–2020

== Gabon ==
- Georges Ambourouet – Ceahlăul Piatra Neamț – 2009–2010
- Aaron Boupendza – Rapid București – 2024–2025
- Gaëtan Missi Mezu – Dunărea Călărași – 2018–2019

== Gambia ==
- Muhammed Badamosi – CFR Cluj – 2025–2026
- **Mouhamadou Drammeh** – **Universitatea Cluj** – 2025–
- Kalifa Kujabi – FC Hermannstadt – 2024–2026
- Sheriff Sinyan – CFR Cluj, Rapid București – 2024–

== Georgia ==
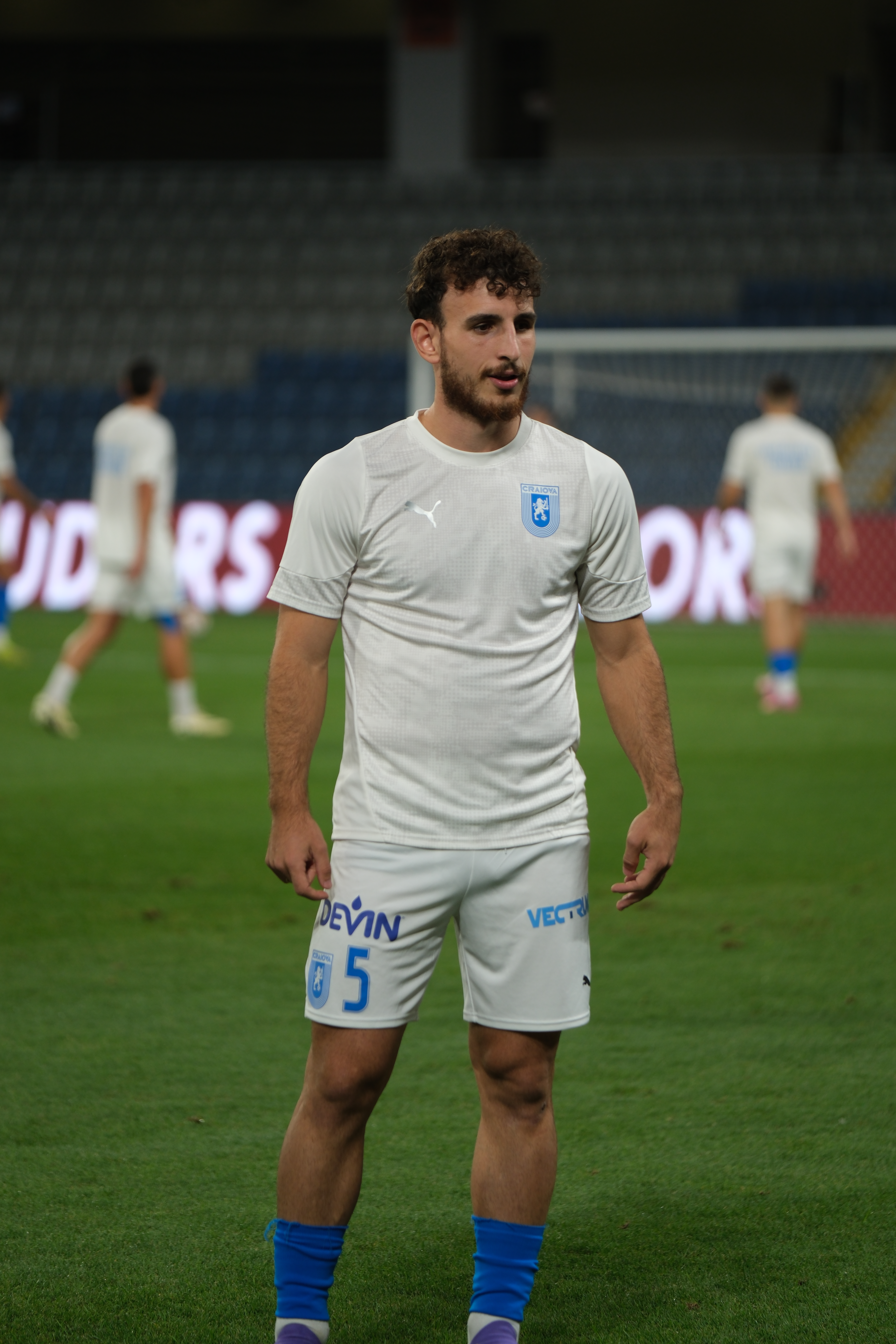
Anzor Mekvabishvili won a Liga I title with CS Universitatea Craiova.

- Giorgi Abuashvili – Petrolul Ploiești – 2023–2024
- Bachana Arabuli – Unirea Slobozia – 2024–2026
- Giorgi Chanturia – CFR Cluj – 2013–2015
- Nika Dzalamidze – SC Juventus București – 2017–2018
- Avtandil Ebralidze – FC Voluntari – 2019–2020
- Iva Gelashvili – CFR Cluj – 2026–
- Akaki Khubutia – Gaz Metan Mediaș, ACS Poli Timișoara – 2009–2013, 2016–2018
- Anzor Mekvabishvili – CS Universitatea Craiova – 2023–2027

== Germany ==
- Marcel Avdić – Oțelul Galați – 2014–2015
- **Christopher Braun** – FC Botoșani, CFR Cluj, Rapid București – 2020–
- Timo Gebhart – Steaua București – 2015–2016
- Sascha Kirschstein – ACS Poli Timișoara – 2015–2016
- Vesel Limaj – FC Hermannstadt – 2022–2023
- Kilian Ludewig – Petrolul Ploiești – 2024–
- Roussel Ngankam – FC Botoșani – 2014–2015
- Maximilian Nicu – Universitatea Cluj – 2013–2014
- Savio Nsereko – FC Vaslui – 2011–2012
- Reagy Ofosu – FC Botoșani, CS Universitatea Craiova, UTA Arad – 2019–2022, 2023–2024
- Hamza Saghiri – Politehnica Iași – 2023–2024
- Patrick Vuc – FC Hermannstadt – 2025–2026

== Ghana ==
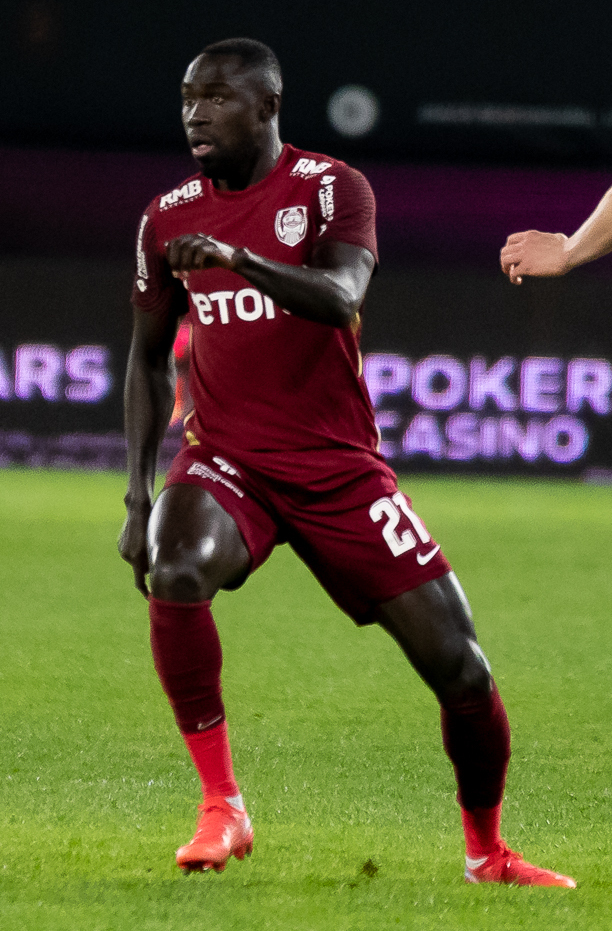
Nana Boateng won a Liga I title with CFR Cluj.

- Eduard Abayeteye – Sportul Studențesc București – 1994–1995
- Moses Abbey – Metaloglobus București – 2025–2026
- Ben Acquah – Argeș Pitești – 1994–1995
- Bright Addae – FC Hermannstadt – 2020–2021
- Ebenezer Annan – Rapid București – 2026–
- Nana Antwi – FCSB, FC Hermannstadt – 2023–2026
- William Amamoo – Farul Constanța – 2003–2004
- Richard Annang – FC Vaslui – 2010–2012
- Emmanuel Armah – Sportul Studențesc București – 1994–1995
- Godfred Bekoé – Gaz Metan Mediaș – 2014–2015
- Lawson Bekui – Politehnica Iași – 2018–2019
- Owusu Benson – Sportul Studențesc București – 1994–1995
- George Blay – Dinamo București, Internațional Curtea de Argeș, Unirea Urziceni – 2006–2011
- Nana Boateng – CFR Cluj, Petrolul Ploiești – 2021–2023, 2025–2026
- Sadat Bukari – Astra Giurgiu – 2012–2015
- Carl Davordzie – Sepsi Sfântu Gheorghe – 2026–
- Mohamed Nuru Deen – UM Timișoara – 2001–2002
- Isaac Donkor – CS Universitatea Craiova – 2018–2019
- Ibrahim Dossey – FC Brașov, Rapid București, Pandurii Târgu Jiu – 2000–2005, 2006–2008
- Richard Gadze – FC Voluntari – 2018–2019
- Michael Idowu – Argeș Pitești – 2025–
- Saeed Issah – FC Hermannstadt – 2020–2021, 2022–2023, 2025–2026
- Mustafa Jarra – FC Brașov – 2002–2003
- Joseph Mensah – Sepsi Sfântu Gheorghe, Politehnica Iași – 2018–2019, 2020–2021
- Nelson Mensah – Dinamo București – 1991–1993
- Paul Mensah – FC Botoșani – 2021–2022
- Hamza Mohammed – Ceahlăul Piatra Neamț – 2007–2008
- Sulley Muniru – CFR Cluj, Steaua București – 2012–2017
- Emmanuel Osei – Politehnica Timișoara – 2005–2006
- Ben Owu – Oțelul Galați – 2001–2002
- Kofi Twumasi – Viitorul Constanța – 2017–2018
- Mohammed Umar – Politehnica Iași – 2024–2025
- Bernard Whyte – Rapid București – 1994–1995
- Seidu Yahaya – Astra Giurgiu – 2012–2015
- Emmanuel Yeboah – CFR Cluj, Corvinul Hunedoara – 2022–2024, 2026–
- Amin Ziblim – CFR Cluj – 2026–

== Greece ==
Pantelis Kapetanos, who scored a total of 48 goals in Liga I, won the title with both CFR Cluj and Steaua București.

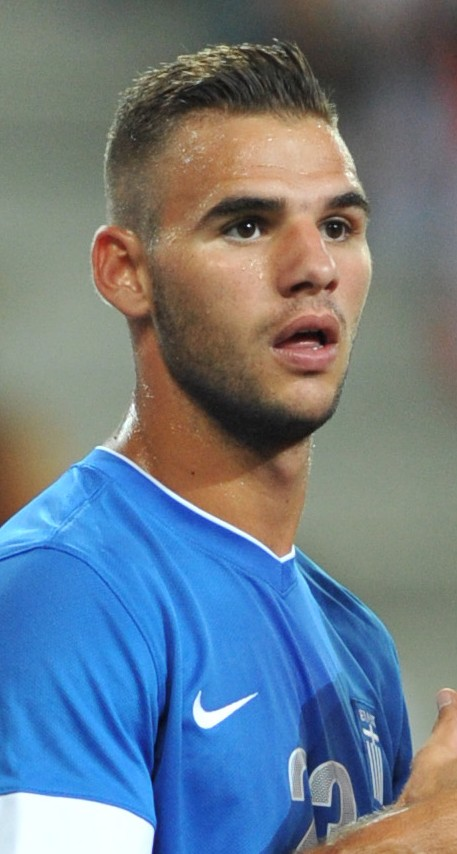
Panagiotis Tachtsidis spent two seasons in Liga I with CFR Cluj.

- Giannis Anestis – FC Botoșani – 2024–
- Nikolaos Baxevanos – FC Botoșani, Politehnica Iași, Chindia Târgoviște – 2019–2022
- Theodor Beffa – Venus București, Sportul Studențesc București – 1936–1941
- Alexandros Biris – CS Turnu Severin – 2012–2013
- Bruno Chalkiadakis – FC Hermannstadt – 2018–2019
- Minas Chalkiadakis – FC Botoșani – 2018–2019
- Okan Chatziterzoglou – Academica Clinceni – 2019–2020
- Kostas Choumis – Venus București, Rapid București, UTA Arad, Gaz Metan Mediaș – 1936–1941, 1947–1948
- Giannis Christopoulos – Oțelul Galați – 2026–
- Panagiotis Deligiannidis – Sepsi Sfântu Gheorghe – 2020–2021
- Konstantinos Doumtsios – Petrolul Ploiești – 2025–
- Sokratis Fytanidis – Gaz Metan Mediaș – 2017–2018
- Vasilios Galanis – Gaz Metan Mediaș – 2009–2010
- Panagiotis Giannopoulos – Argeș Pitești – 2006–2007
- Pantelis Kapetanos – Steaua București, CFR Cluj – 2008–2014
- Nikos Karamanlis – Jiul Petroșani – 1970–1971
- Giorgos Katsikas – Dinamo București – 2017–2019
- Nikos Kenourgios – Dinamo București – 2021–2022
- Giannis Kontoes – Academica Clinceni – 2019–2020
- Georgios Koutroumpis – Concordia Chiajna – 2018–2019
- Anestis Nastos – Rapid București – 2021–2022
- Giannis Matzourakis – Rapid București – 1969–1970
- Christos Metskas – UTA Arad – 1957–1968
- Leonidas Panagopoulos – CS Turnu Severin, Săgeata Năvodari, Universitatea Cluj – 2012–2015
- Iorgos Pantazis – FC Galați – 1974–1975
- Kyriakos Papadopoulos – FC U Craiova – 2022–2023
- Emmanouil Papasterianos – Concordia Chiajna – 2013–2014
- Thanasis Papazoglou – Dinamo București, FC Voluntari – 2018–2020
- Vasileios Pliatsikas – Astra Giurgiu – 2014–2015
- Konstantinos Rougalas – ASA Târgu Mureș – 2016–2017
- Dimitris Sialmas – Ceahlăul Piatra Neamț – 2014–2015
- Aristidis Soiledis – FC Botoșani, FCSB – 2018–2021
- Stefanos Stroungis – UTA Arad – 2023–2024
- Panagiotis Tachtsidis – CFR Cluj – 2023–2025
- Apostolos Vellios – Academica Clinceni – 2021–2022
- Giorgos Zindros – CS Universitatea Craiova – 1975–1976

== Guadeloupe ==
- Simon Elisor – CS Universitatea Craiova – 2026–
- Marcus Coco – CFR Cluj – 2025–2026
- Stéphane Zubar – FC Vaslui – 2008–2010

== Guatemala ==
- Nicolás Samayoa – Politehnica Iași – 2023–2025

== Guinea ==
- Habib Baldé – Ceahlăul Piatra Neamț, Universitatea Cluj – 2009–2011, 2013–2014
- Sekou Camara – FC Botoșani, Unirea Slobozia, Politehnica Iași – 2020–2025
- Antoine Conte – CS Universitatea Craiova – 2021–2022
- Ibrahima Conté – UTA Arad – 2023–2025
- Salim Cissé – Politehnica Iași – 2017–2018
- Amadou Diallo – CS Mioveni – 2022–2023
- Boubacar Fofana – Gaz Metan Mediaș, Sepsi Sfântu Gheorghe – 2018–2022
- Mbemba Sylla – Național București, FC Vaslui – 2003–2006

== Guinea-Bissau ==
- Ibraima Baldé – Politehnica Iaşi – 2009–2010
- Mimito Biai – Argeș Pitești – 2022–2023
- Abel Camará – Petrolul Ploiești – 2013–2014
- Aliu Djaló – Gaz Metan Mediaș – 2013–2014
- Bruno Fernandes – Ceahlăul Piatra Neamț, Unirea Urziceni, FCM Târgu Mureș – 2007–2011
- Edgar Ié – Dinamo București – 2023–2024
- Francisco Júnior – Gaz Metan Mediaș, Sepsi Sfântu Gheorghe, FC Botoșani – 2020–2025
- Pedro Justiniano – Petrolul Ploiești – 2023–2024
- Malá – Farul Constanța, Ceahlăul Piatra Neamț – 2007–2008
- Toni Silva – Astra Giurgiu – 2019–2020
- Zé Turbo – Oțelul Galați – 2026–

== Guyana ==
- Terell Ondaan – FC U Craiova – 2021–2022

== Haiti ==
- Jean Sony Alcénat – Petrolul Ploiești, Steaua București, FC Voluntari – 2012–2016
- Bryan Alceus – Gaz Metan Mediaș, Argeș Pitești – 2020–2023
- Mikaël Cantave – Chindia Târgoviște – 2021–2022
- Sony Mustivar – Petrolul Ploiești, FC Hermannstadt – 2011–2015, 2020–2021

== Honduras ==
- Édgar Álvarez – Dinamo București – 2012–2013
- Carlos Costly – FC Vaslui – 2009–2010
- Denil Maldonado – CS Universitatea Craiova – 2023–2025

== Hong Kong ==
- Stefan Pereira – Rapid București – 2012–2013

== Hungary ==
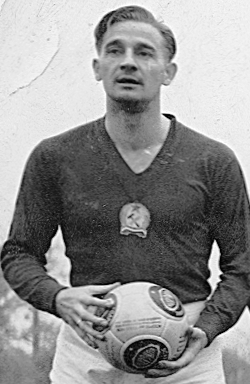
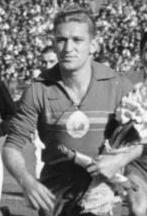
Hungary's Mighty Magyar, Gyula Lóránt (left), and the Romanian-Hungarian international József Pecsovszky (right) won the Liga I title in their single season together at UTA Arad.
- István Avar – AMEF Arad, Colțea Brașov, Rapid București – 1921–1922, 1925–1927, 1936–1941
- Benjamin Babati – Csíkszereda – 2025–2026
- Iuliu Barátky – Stăruința Oradea, CA Oradea, Crișana Oradea, Rapid București, RATA Târgu Mureș – 1927–1930, 1933–1941, 1946–1948
- Elemér Berkessy – Jiul Petroșani – 1924–1925
- Iuliu Bodola – CA Oradea, Venus București, Ferar Cluj – 1932–1940, 1946–1947
- Géza Boldizsár – Ferar Cluj – 1946–1947
- Lukács Bőle – Politehnica Iași – 2014–2017
- János Börzsei – Ferar Cluj – 1946–1947
- Levente Bősz – Politehnica Iași – 2020–2021
- Gyula Dobó – Juventus București – 1925–1926, 1929–1930, 1933–1935
- Szabolcs Dusinszki – Csíkszereda – 2025–2026
- Vilmos Engel – Mureșul Târgu Mureș – 1923–1924
- Márton Eppel – Csíkszereda – 2025–
- Árpád Fekete – Carmen București – 1946–1947
- János Ferenczi – Csíkszereda – 2025–2026
- János Füzér – Ferar Cluj – 1946–1947
- János Hegedűs – Csíkszereda – 2025–
- Artúr Horváth – Csíkszereda – 2026–
- Norbert Kaján – Csíkszereda – 2025–2026
- Ákos Kecskés – Sepsi Sfântu Gheorghe – 2023–2025
- Dávid Kelemen – Csíkszereda – 2025–2026
- László Kleinheisler – Csíkszereda – 2025–2026
- János Kovács – CA Oradea, Tricolor Ploiești – 1937–1939, 1940–1941, 1947–1951
- Nicolae Kovács – Chinezul Timișoara, Banatul Timișoara, CA Oradea, Ripensia Timișoara, Tricolor Ploiești, Ferar Cluj – 1927–1929, 1932–1939, 1946–1948
- Zsolt Magyar – Csíkszereda – 2026–
- Adalbert Marksteiner – Ripensia Timișoara – 1937–1940
- Francisc Mészáros – UTA Arad – 1946–1948
- Vasile Miriuță – Dinamo București, Gloria Bistrița – 1990–1992
- János Nagy – Csíkszereda – 2025–2026
- Olivér Nagy – Ceahlăul Piatra Neamț – 2014–2015
- Zoárd Nagy – Csíkszereda – 2025–2026
- Ádám Lang – CFR Cluj – 2018–2019
- Gyula Lóránt – UTA Arad – 1946–1947
- Máté Ódor – Csíkszereda – 2026–
- József Pecsovszky – CAM Timișoara, UTA Arad, CCA București – 1939–1940, 1946–1961
- Krisztián Pogacsics – Săgeata Năvodari – 2013–2014
- Dániel Prosser – Sepsi Sfântu Gheorghe – 2018–2019
- Dávid Sigér – Sepsi Sfântu Gheorghe – 2024–2025
- Péter Simek – Politehnica Timișoara – 2006–2007
- Vilmos Sipos – Rapid București – 1939–1941
- Francisc Spielmann – CA Oradea, UD Reșița – 1934–1938, 1939–1940, 1946–1950
- Albert Ströck – Stăruința Oradea – 1921–1922
- Alex Szabó – Csíkszereda – 2026–
- Bálint Szabó – Csíkszereda – 2025–2026
- Szabolcs Szalay – Csíkszereda – 2025–
- Zoltán Szaniszló – AMEF Arad, Ferar Cluj – 1934–1940, 1946–1948
- Mátyás Tajti – Csíkszereda – 2025–
- Márk Tamás – Sepsi Sfântu Gheorghe – 2022–2025
- Mihai Tänzer – Chinezul Timișoara, Ripensia Timișoara – 1921–1928, 1939–1941
- Pál Teleki – Chinezul Timișoara – 1926–1928
- Mátyás Tóth – UTA Arad – 1946–1947
- Kevin Varga – Sepsi Sfântu Gheorghe – 2023–2025
- Roland Varga – Sepsi Sfântu Gheorghe – 2022–2024
- Ádám Vass – CFR Cluj – 2012–2013
- Adolf Vécsey – CA Oradea – 1946–1952
- Bence Végh – Csíkszereda – 2025–2026
- Dániel Zsóri – UTA Arad – 2024–2026

== Iceland ==
- Rúnar Sigurjónsson – CFR Cluj, FC Voluntari – 2020–2024

== Iraq ==
- Ghassan Heamed – Sportul Studențesc București – 1994–1995
- Salih Jaber – FC Universitatea Craiova, Gloria Buzău – 2006–2009
- Ali Wahaib – Oțelul Galați – 1997–1998

== Ireland ==
- Conor Henderson – Dunărea Călărași – 2018–2019
- Roland Idowu – FC Botoșani – 2026–
- Sean McDermott – Dinamo București – 2018–2019

== Israel ==
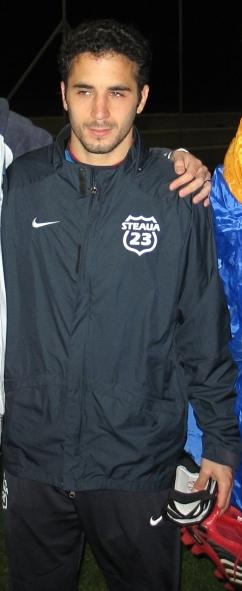
Klemi Saban played briefly in Liga I for Steaua București.

- Ofri Arad – FCSB – 2025–
- Gai Assulin – Politehnica Iași – 2019–2021
- Shlomi Azulay – Astra Giurgiu – 2020–2021
- Nir Bardea – Sepsi Sfântu Gheorghe – 2024–2025
- Idan Baruch – Concordia Chiajna – 2011–2012
- Guy Dahan – Unirea Slobozia – 2025–2026
- Hatem Abd Elhamed – Dinamo București – 2014–2015
- Idan Golan – FC Voluntari – 2021–2022
- Shai Haddad – Petrolul Ploiești – 2014–2015
- Loai Halaf – UTA Arad – 2024–2025
- Yuval Jakobovich – ASA Târgu Mureș – 2016–2017
- Omri Kende – Astra Giurgiu – 2012–2013
- Ziv Morgan – CFR Cluj – 2023–2024
- Kobi Nachtailer – FC Vaslui – 2006–2007
- Alon Netzer – ASA Târgu Mureș, Academica Clinceni – 2016–2017, 2019–2020
- Klemi Saban – Steaua București – 2006–2007
- Elad Shahaf – FC Botoșani – 2022–2023
- Nikita Stoinov – Dinamo București – 2025–
- Ram Strauss – ACS Poli Timișoara – 2015–2016
- Toto Tamuz – Petrolul Ploiești – 2013–2016
- David Tiram – Astra Giurgiu – 2019–2020
- Aviel Zargari – FC Hermannstadt – 2025–2026

== Italy ==
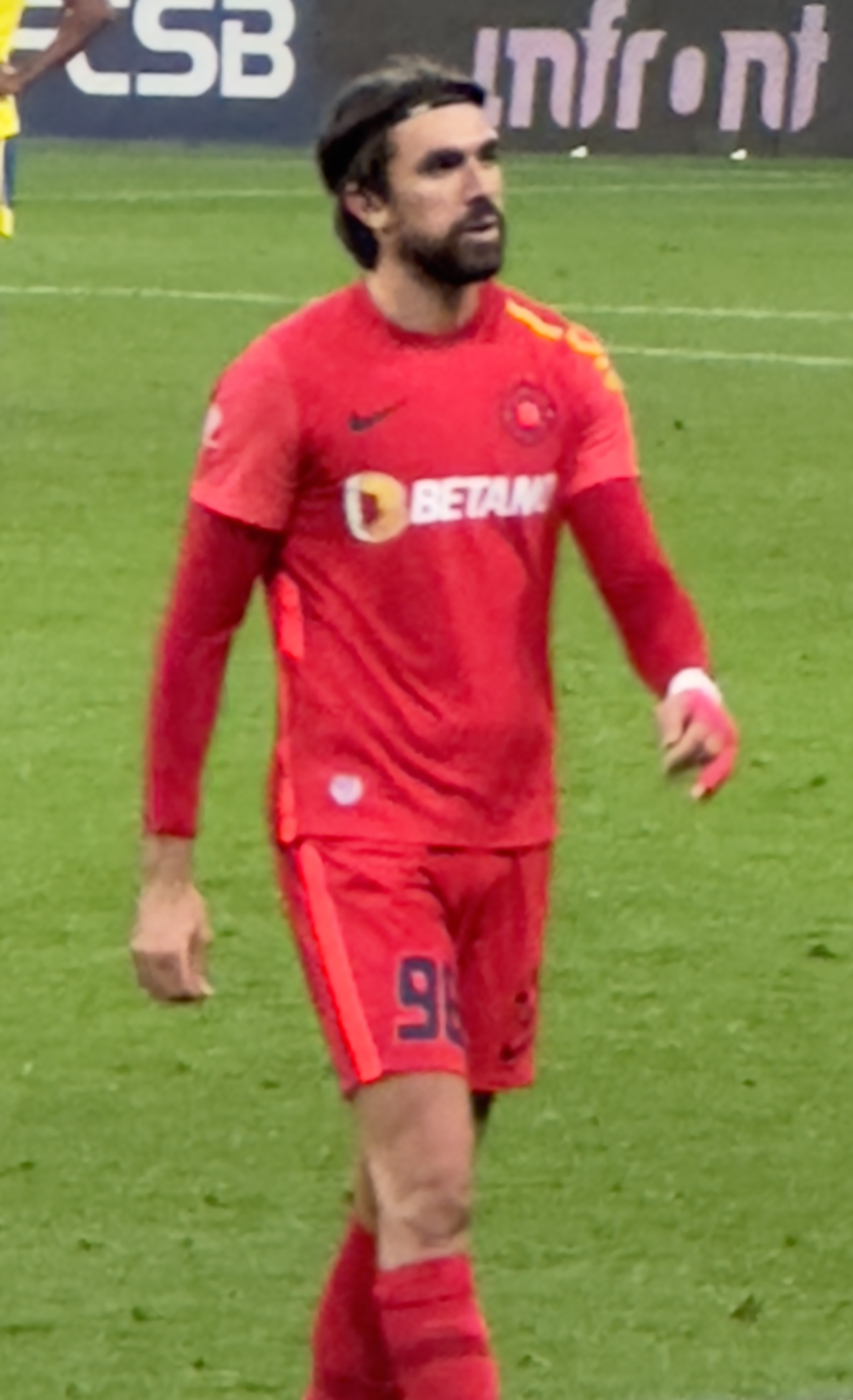
Andrea Compagno was named the Liga I Foreign Player of the Year in 2022.

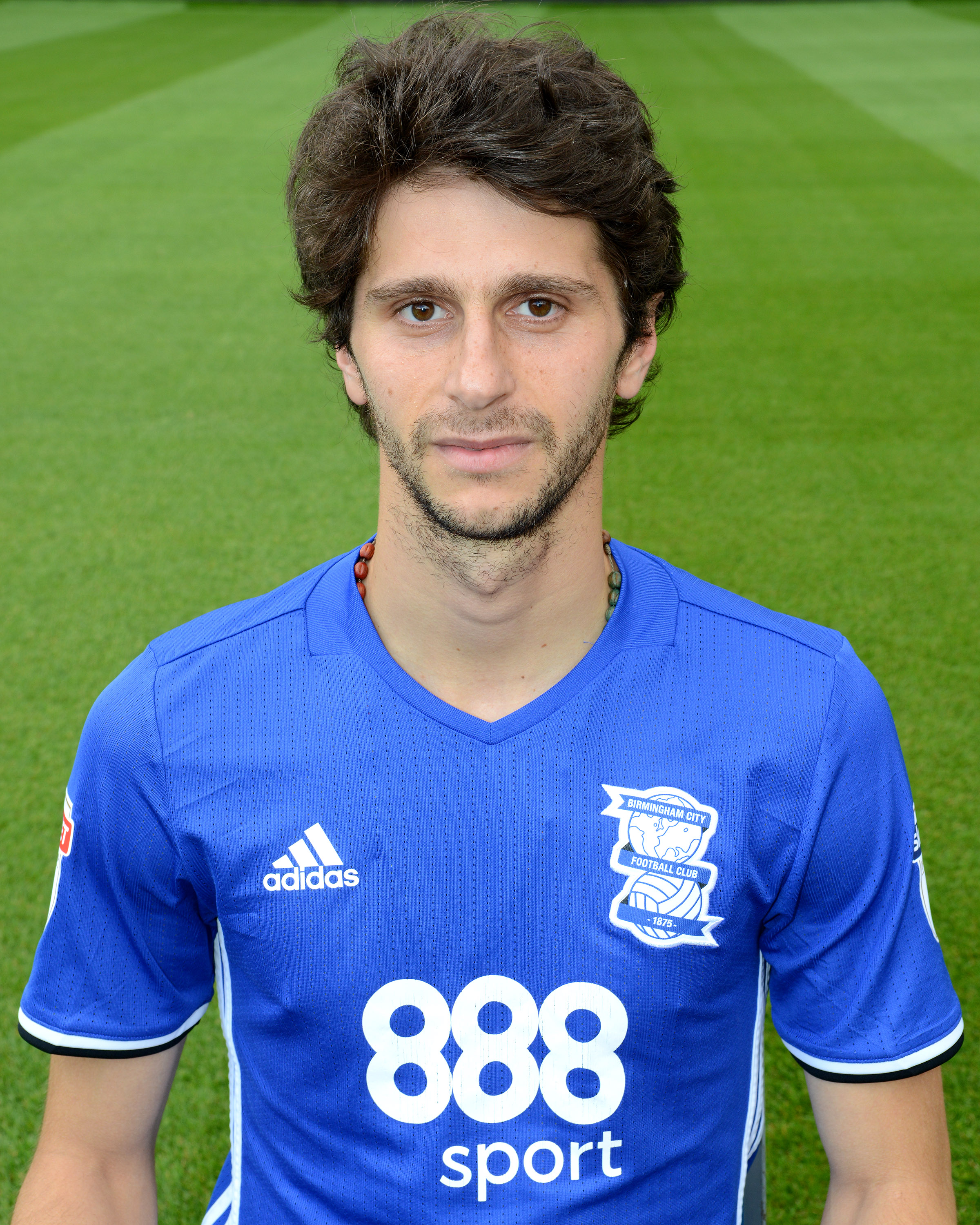
International Diego Fabbrini spent three seasons in Liga I with FC Botoșani and Dinamo București.

Federico Piovaccari, in his single season spent at Steaua București, scored 10 goals and won the Liga I title.

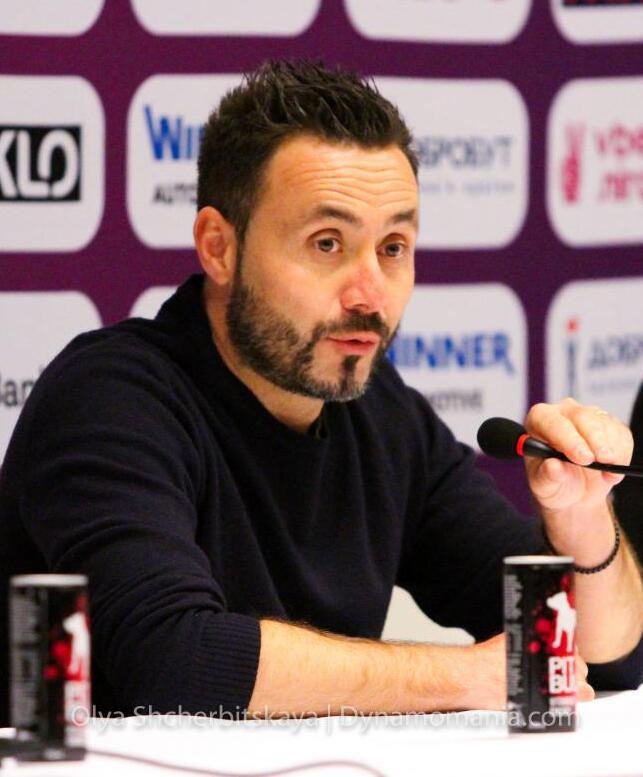
Roberto De Zerbi won two Liga I titles with CFR Cluj

- Remo Amadio – CFR Cluj – 2014–2015
- Nicola Ascoli – Universitatea Cluj – 2010–2011
- Stefano Avogadri – Petrolul Ploiești – 2012–2013
- Davide Bottone – CFR Cluj – 2009–2010
- Fabio Bravo – Gaz Metan Mediaș – 2012–2014
- Alessandro Caparco – FCM Târgu Mureș, Politehnica Iași, Concordia Chiajna – 2011–2012, 2014–2019
- Simone Cavalli – Gloria Bistrița, FCM Târgu Mureș – 2010–2012
- Luca Ceccarelli – Dinamo București – 2016–2017
- Iacopo Cernigoi – CFR Cluj – 2025–2026
- Christian Chirieletti – Ceahlăul Piatra Neamț – 2014–2015
- **Juri Cisotti** – Oțelul Galați, **FCSB** – 2023–
- Andrea Compagno – FC U Craiova, FCSB – 2021–2024
- Godberg Cooper – Chindia Târgoviște, UTA Arad – 2022–2024
- Riccardo Corallo – Gloria Bistrița – 2010–2011
- Antonino D'Agostino – Gloria Bistrița – 2010–2011
- Giuseppe De Luca – CFR Cluj – 2018–2019
- Roberto De Zerbi – CFR Cluj – 2009–2012
- Mario Donadoni – FCM Târgu Mureș – 2010–2011
- Nicolao Dumitru – Gaz Metan Mediaș, UTA Arad – 2019–2022
- Diego Fabbrini – FC Botoșani, Dinamo București – 2018–2021
- Cosimo Figliomeni – Gaz Metan Mediaș – 2014–2015
- Marco Fossati – Universitatea Cluj – 2023–2024
- Matteo Gritti – Petrolul Ploiești – 2011–2012
- Luigi Lavecchia – FCM Târgu Mureș – 2010–2011
- Francesco Margiotta – FC Botoșani – 2023–2024
- Davide Massaro – CS Mioveni, Academica Clinceni – 2021–2022
- Carlo Melchior – Juventus București – 1925–1926, 1929–1930, 1933–1935
- Bryan Mendoza – FC Botoșani – 2019–2020
- Alessandro Micai – CFR Cluj – 2025–2026
- Mattia Montini – Dinamo București, Astra Giurgiu – 2018–2021
- Giacomo Moretti – Juventus București – 1925–1926
- Alessandro Murgia – FC Hermannstadt, Universitatea Cluj – 2023–2026
- Andrea Padula – FC U Craiova, UTA Arad – 2023–2024, 2025–
- Michele Paolucci – Petrolul Ploiești – 2015–2016
- Lorenzo Paramatti – FC U Craiova – 2021–2024
- Mattia Persano – FC Hermannstadt – 2019–2020
- Davide Petrucci – CFR Cluj – 2014–2017
- Gianmarco Piccioni – Politehnica Iași – 2015–2017
- Felice Piccolo – CFR Cluj – 2009–2014
- Mirko Pigliacelli – CS Universitatea Craiova – 2018–2023
- Federico Piovaccari – Steaua București – 2013–2014
- Riccardo Piscitelli – Dinamo București – 2019–2020
- Giuseppe Prestia – Oțelul Galați, Petrolul Ploiești – 2013–2014, 2015–2016
- Roberto Romeo – Gaz Metan Mediaș, Universitatea Cluj – 2013–2015, 2016–2023
- Fausto Rossi – CS Universitatea Craiova – 2017–2018
- Adriano Russo – FC Voluntari – 2018–2019
- Said Ahmed Said – Argeș Pitești, Unirea Slobozia – 2021–2022, 2025–2026
- Simone Scuffet – CFR Cluj – 2022–2023
- Ferdinando Sforzini – CFR Cluj – 2010–2011
- Mario Titone – Ceahlăul Piatra Neamț – 2012–2013
- Ricardo de Vittor – Juventus București – 1935–1937
- Gabriele Zerbo – Concordia Chiajna – 2015–2016

== Ivory Coast ==
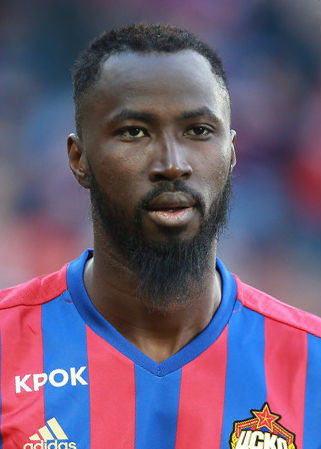
CFR Cluj was Lacina Traoré's first European club.

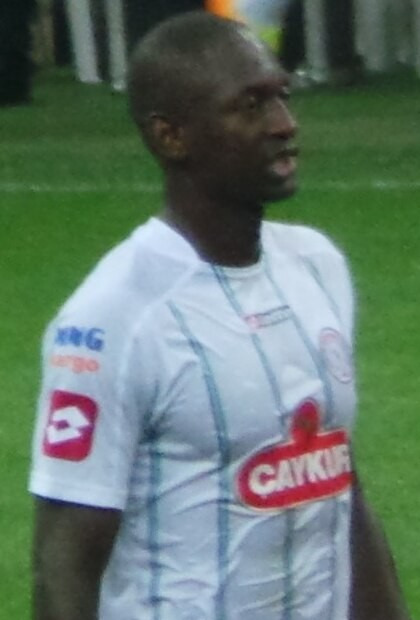
Ousmane Viera made 235 appearances in Liga I for five different clubs.

- Stephane Acka – CS Universitatea Craiova – 2014–2017, 2018–2021
- Anoh Attoukora – Dinamo București – 2008–2009
- Mamadou Bagayoko – FC U Craiova – 2021–2022
- Kévin Boli – Viitorul Constanța, CFR Cluj, FC Botoșani, Farul Constanța – 2015–2021, 2022–2024
- **Jonathan Cissé** – **Oțelul Galați**, Universitatea Cluj – 2023–
- Mariko Daouda – FC Universitatea Craiova, Dinamo București, Argeș Pitești, CS Mioveni – 2002–2008
- Zié Diabaté – Dinamo București – 2007–2012
- Lamine Diarrassouba – Politehnica Iași, FC Brașov – 2008–2011
- Leoh Digbeu – Concordia Chiajna – 2014–2015
- Ismaël Diomandé – Petrolul Ploiești – 2022–2024
- Constant Djakpa – Pandurii Târgu Jiu – 2007–2008
- Seniko Doua – Petrolul Ploiești – 2022–2024
- Kevin Doukouré – Farul Constanța, Universitatea Cluj, Argeș Pitești – 2022–2024, 2025–
- Jean Armel Drolé – FC Botoșani – 2023–2024
- Ricky Gnéba – CFR Cluj – 2023–2024
- Ghislain Guessan – Concordia Chiajna – 2018–2019
- Barry Kader – CS Turnu Severin – 2012–2013
- Youssouf Kamara – Argeș Pitești, Pandurii Târgu Jiu – 2008–2010
- Wilfried Kanon – Gloria Bistrița, Corona Brașov – 2012–2014
- Aboubakar Keita – Sepsi Sfântu Gheorghe – 2026–
- Kader Keïta – CFR Cluj, Rapid București – 2023–2026
- Emmanuel Koné – CFR Cluj, Internațional Curtea de Argeș – 2008–2012
- Hamed Koné – FC Voluntari – 2015–2016
- Christ Kouadio – Politehnica Iași, Metaloglobus București – 2023–2024, 2025–2026
- Kouassi Kouadja – Astra Giurgiu – 2014–2015
- Kouya Mabea – UTA Arad – 2024–2025
- Issouf Macalou – Universitatea Cluj – 2024–
- Aymar Meleke – FC Voluntari – 2022–2023
- Ulrich Meleke – FC Botoșani, FC Voluntari – 2020–2023
- Muhamed Olawale – FC Voluntari – 2021–2022
- Senin Sebai – Astra Giurgiu – 2014–2015
- Valentin Serebe – CFR Cluj – 2023–2024
- Habib Sylla – Oțelul Galați – 2026–
- Junior Tallo – FC Botoșani – 2022–2023
- Eric Tape – Rapid București – 2026–
- Lacina Traoré – CFR Cluj – 2008–2011, 2019–2020
- Ousmane Viera – CFR Cluj, Internațional Curtea de Argeș, Pandurii Târgu Jiu, Sepsi Sfântu Gheorghe, FC Hermannstadt – 2008–2013, 2017–2021
- Yedi Zahiri – Gloria Bistrița – 2012–2013
- Kévin Zougoula – Dinamo București – 2013–2014
- Marco Zoro – FC Universitatea Craiova – 2010–2011

== Jamaica ==
- Kemar Lawrence – UTA Arad – 2023–2024
- Ronaldo Webster – CS Universitatea Craiova – 2026–
- Jason Wright – CS Mioveni – 2021–2022

== Japan ==
- Yôki Kumada – Gaz Metan Mediaș – 2013–2014
- Sota Mino – FC Hermannstadt, Sepsi Sfântu Gheorghe, UTA Arad – 2022–
- Takuto Oshima – CS Universitatea Craiova – 2024–2025
- Takayuki Seto – Astra Giurgiu, Petrolul Ploiești, Argeș Pitești – 2009–2018, 2019–2021, 2022–2026

== Jordan ==
- Mo Abualnadi – Corvinul Hunedoara – 2026–
- Tha'er Bawab – Gloria Bistrița, Gaz Metan Mediaș, CS Universitatea Craiova, Steaua București, Dinamo București, Concordia Chiajna – 2010–2019

== Kazakhstan ==
- Abat Aymbetov – Petrolul Ploiești – 2025–2026

== Kenya ==
- Jamal Mohammed – FCM Târgu Mureș – 2011–2012
- Richard Odada – UTA Arad – 2025–
- Aboud Omar – Sepsi Sfântu Gheorghe – 2018–2019
- Eric Omondi – UTA Arad – 2023–2025
- Patrick Osiako – Petrolul Ploiești – 2011–2012

== Kosovo ==
- Albin Berisha – Petrolul Ploiești – 2023–2025
- Lindon Emërllahu – CFR Cluj – 2024–2026
- Valon Hamdiu – Unirea Slobozia – 2025–2026
- Florent Hasani – Rapid București – 2023–2025
- Drilon Hazrollaj – Rapid București – 2025–2026
- Muhamet Hyseni – Farul Constanța – 2026–
- Arian Kabashi – Csíkszereda – 2025–2026
- **Meriton Korenica** – **CFR Cluj** – 2024–
- Ermal Krasniqi – CFR Cluj, Rapid București – 2022–2024
- Jetmir Krasniqi – FC Voluntari – 2018–2019
- Florian Loshaj – Politehnica Iași – 2019–2020
- Albion Rrahmani – Rapid București – 2023–2025
- Leard Sadriu – Argeș Pitești – 2025–
- Astrit Selmani – Dinamo București – 2023–2025
- Ismet Sinani – UTA Arad – 2026–
- Armend Thaqi – CFR Cluj – 2024–2025

== Latvia ==
- Edgars Gauračs – Rapid București – 2009–2010
- Deniss Ivanovs – FC Botoșani – 2013–2014
- Vitālijs Jagodinskis – Politehnica Iași – 2017–2018
- Ņikita Koļesovs – FC Botoșani – 2019–2020
- Deniss Romanovs – Dinamo București – 2006–2008
- Valērijs Šabala – Viitorul Constanța – 2020–2021
- Aleksejs Saveļjevs – Gloria Buzău – 2024–2025
- Māris Smirnovs – Dinamo București – 2006–2007

== Lebanon ==
- Fayez Chamsine – Pandurii Târgu Jiu – 2013–2015

== Liberia ==
- Nyema Gerhardt – CS Otopeni – 2008–2009
- Dulee Johnson – Săgeata Năvodari, CSMS Iași – 2013–2015
- Mohammed Kamara – CFR Cluj, Rapid București – 2024–
- Alex Nimely – ACS Poli Timișoara, Viitorul Constanța – 2015–2017
- Moussa Sanoh – Politehnica Iași, Gaz Metan Mediaș, FC Voluntari, CS Mioveni – 2018–2022
- Ben Teekloh – Farul Constanța, Astra Ploiești – 2006–2009, 2010–2011
- Terrence Tisdell – FC Botoșani – 2021–2023

== Lithuania ==
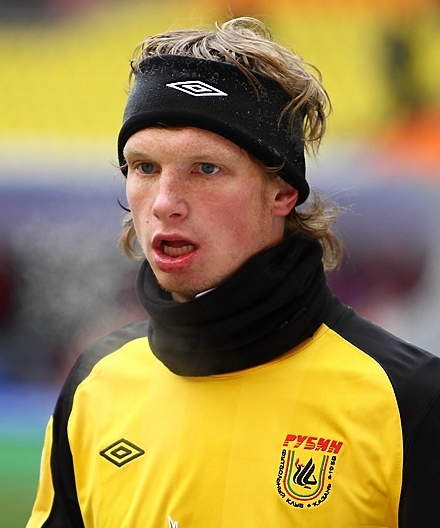
Giedrius Arlauskis won seven Liga I titles with three different teams: one with each of Unirea Urziceni and Steaua București, and five with CFR Cluj.

- Giedrius Arlauskis – Unirea Urziceni, Steaua București, CFR Cluj, CS Universitatea Craiova – 2007–2011, 2014–2015, 2017–2023
- Rolandas Baravykas – UTA Arad, Universitatea Cluj, Farul Constanța – 2021–2023
- Vytautas Černiauskas – FC Vaslui, Dinamo București – 2010–2014, 2015–2017
- Edvinas Gertmonas – Universitatea Cluj – 2023–2026
- Paulius Grybauskas – Oțelul Galați – 2006–2009
- Donatas Kazlauskas – Academica Clinceni – 2021–2022
- Linas Klimavičius – Dinamo București, Politehnica Iași – 2018–2020
- Tadas Labukas – Oțelul Galați – 2007–2008
- Karolis Laukžemis – UTA Arad – 2021–2022
- Rokas Lekiatas – FC U Craiova – 2023–2024
- Deivydas Matulevičius – Pandurii Târgu Jiu, FC Botoșani – 2012–2017
- Marius Papšys – Sepsi Sfântu Gheorghe – 2017–2018
- Linas Pilibaitis – Sepsi Sfântu Gheorghe – 2017–2018
- Tadas Simaitis – Oțelul Galați – 2012–2014
- Vaidas Slavickas – Ceahlăul Piatra Neamț – 2013–2015
- Povilas Valinčius – Petrolul Ploiești – 2011–2012, 2013–2014
- Nerijus Valskis – CS Universitatea Craiova – 2014–2015
- Aurimas Vertelis – FC Botoșani – 2013–2014
- Armantas Vitkauskas – Concordia Chiajna – 2017–2018
- Modestas Vorobjovas – UTA Arad, Chindia Târgoviște – 2020–2023

== Luxembourg ==
- Vahid Selimović – FC Hermannstadt – 2024–2026

== Madagascar ==
- Hakim Abdallah – Dinamo București, UTA Arad – 2023–
- Dorian Bertrand – Argeș Pitești – 2022–2023
- Julio Donisa – Argeș Pitești – 2022–2023

== Malawi ==
- **Charles Petro** – **FC Botoșani** – 2022–

== Malaysia ==
- Endrick Parafita – FC Botoșani – 2016–2017

== Mali ==
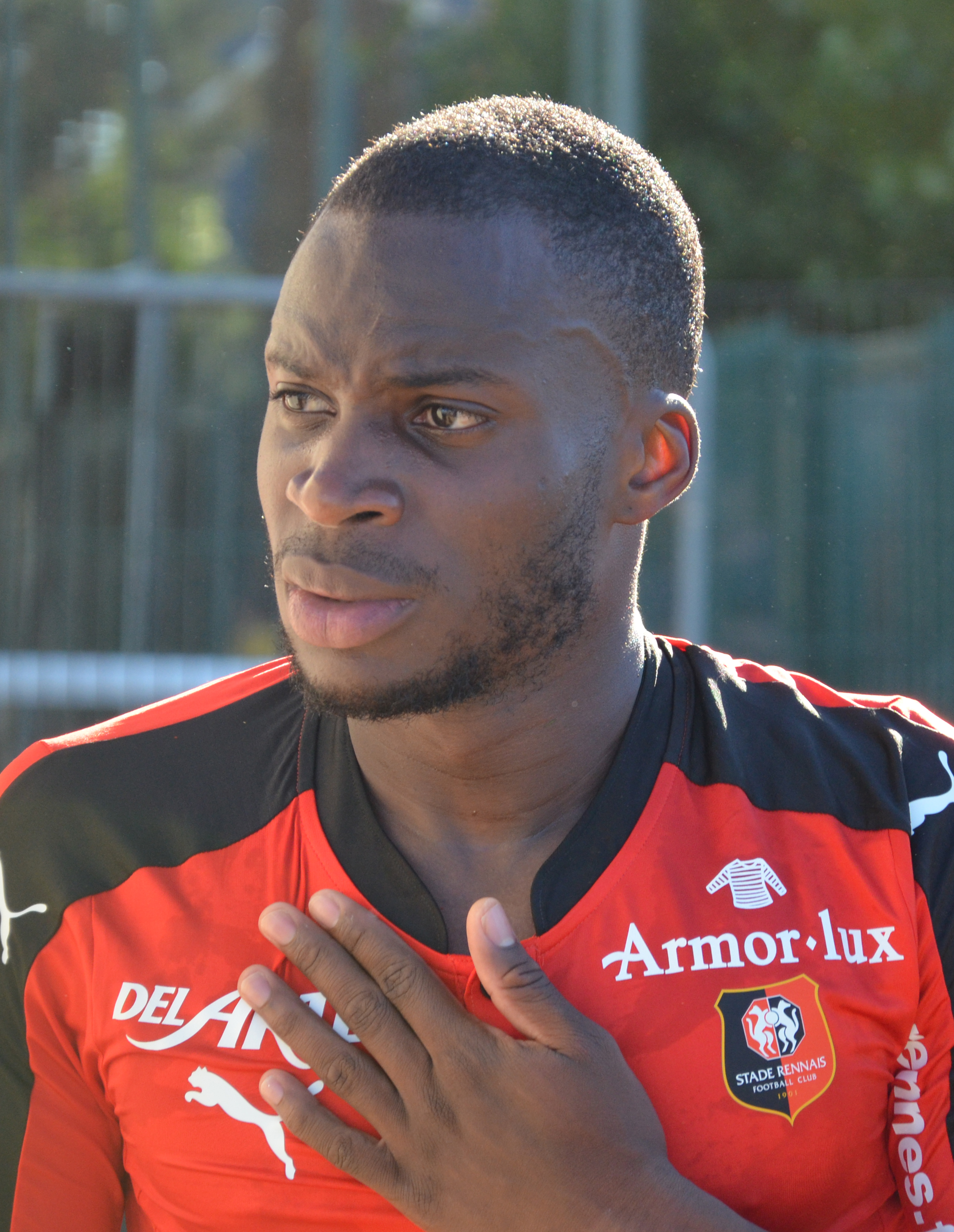
Yacouba Sylla had two short stints in Liga I with CFR Cluj and Botoșani.

- Bourama Fomba – Politehnica Iași, Chindia Târgoviște – 2019–2021
- Mourtala Diakité – Dinamo București – 2008–2009
- Moussa Diakité – FC Botoșani – 2018–2019
- Aly Mallé – Oțelul Galați – 2023–2024
- Mamoutou N'Diaye – Dinamo București – 2018–2019
- Hadi Sacko – CFR Cluj – 2021–2022
- Moussa Samaké – CFR Cluj – 2025–2026
- Yacouba Sylla – CFR Cluj, FC Botoșani – 2019–2020, 2022–2023
- Ibrahima Tandia – Sepsi Sfântu Gheorghe – 2017–2019
- Cheick Traoré – Gloria Buzău – 2024–2025

== Martinique ==
- Jérémy Corinus – Academica Clinceni, Farul Constanța, Chindia Târgoviște – 2021–2023
- Damien Dussaut – Dinamo București, Viitorul Constanța, Farul Constanța, Rapid București, UTA Arad – 2018–2025
- Wesley Jobello – UTA Arad, Argeș Pitești – 2022–2023
- Brighton Labeau – Rapid București – 2019–2020
- Ronny Labonne – FCSB – 2026–
- Geoffrey Malfleury – FC Voluntari – 2018–2019
- Florent Poulolo – UTA Arad, Universitatea Cluj – 2024–

== Mauritania ==
- **Aly Abeid** – UTA Arad, **CFR Cluj** – 2022–
- Guessouma Fofana – CFR Cluj – 2021–2022

== Mauritius ==
- Kévin Bru – Dinamo București – 2019–2020
- Rosario Latouchent – Oțelul Galați – 2023–2024
- Lindsay Rose – Sepsi Sfântu Gheorghe – 2026–

== Mexico ==
- Omar Govea – FC Voluntari – 2022–2023
- Paolo Medina – FC Hermannstadt, Unirea Slobozia – 2022–2025

== Moldova ==
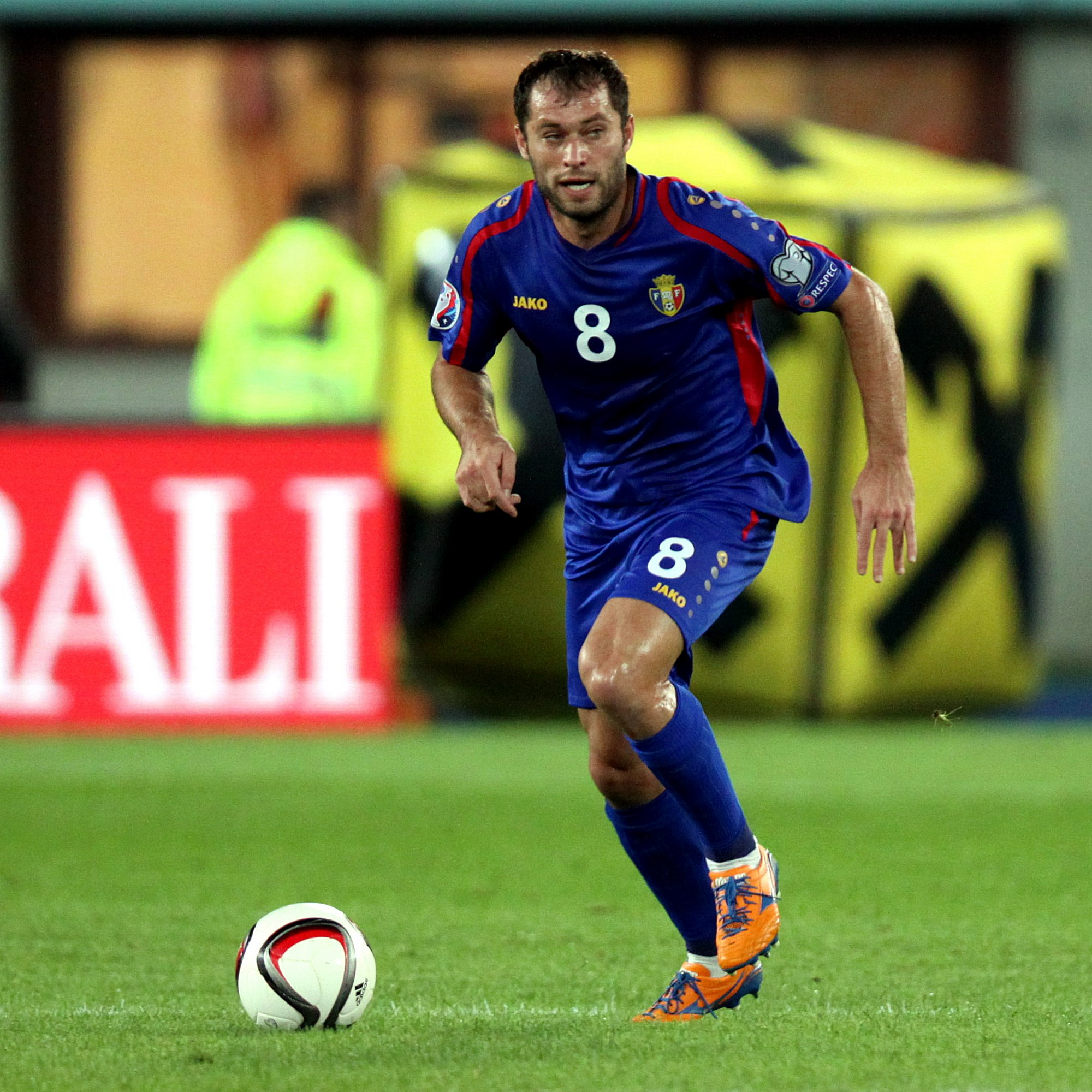
Eugeniu Cebotaru played for Ceahlăul Piatra Neamț, Academica Clinceni, and Petrolul Ploiești for a total of seven seasons in Liga I, accumulating 167 games and 17 goals.

- Valeriu Andronic – Dinamo București – 2000–2001
- Igor Armaș – FC Voluntari – 2018–2024
- Vladislav Blănuță – FC U Craiova, Universitatea Cluj – 2022–2025
- Ștefan Bodișteanu – Viitorul Constanța, Farul Constanța, Oțelul Galați, FC Botoșani − 2019–2022, 2023–
- Andrian Bogdan – Politehnica Timișoara – 2002–2003
- Gheorghe Boghiu – Oțelul Galați – 2006–2008
- Alexandru Boiciuc – Politehnica Iași, Academica Clinceni, Universitatea Cluj – 2014–2017, 2020–2021
- Ianoș Brînză – FC Botoșani, Politehnica Iași − 2017–2019, 2020–2021
- Igor Bugaiov – Ceahlăul Piatra Neamț – 2007–2008
- Nicolae Calancea – Ceahlăul Piatra Neamț, FC Voluntari, CS Universitatea Craiova, Dunărea Călărași, Academica Clinceni – 2013–2020
- Ion Cărăruș – Corvinul Hunedoara – 2026–
- Cătălin Carp – CFR Cluj, Steaua București, Viitorul Constanța, Dinamo București, UTA Arad – 2014–2017, 2021–2022, 2023–2024
- Eugeniu Cebotaru – Ceahlăul Piatra Neamț, Academica Clinceni, Petrolul Ploiești – 2006–2008, 2009–2010, 2011–2012, 2019–2021, 2022–2023
- Dumitru Ciumac – Ceahlăul Piatra Neamț – 2003–2004
- Sergiu Chirilov – Sportul Studențesc București, Rapid București – 1993–1996, 1999–2000
- Oleg Clonin – Ceahlăul Piatra Neamț – 2014–2015
- Maxim Cojocaru – Oțelul Galați – 2024–2025
- Igor Corjan – Olimpia Satu Mare – 1998–1999
- Vitalie Damașcan – Sepsi Sfântu Gheorghe, FC Voluntari – 2021–2024
- Alexandru Dedov – ASA Târgu Mureș – 2015–2016
- Daniel Dumbrăvanu – CFR Cluj, FC Voluntari – 2025–
- Enrichi Finica – Rapid București – 2021–2022
- Viorel Frunză – FC Vaslui, CFR Cluj, Ceahlăul Piatra Neamț – 2005–2008
- Alexandru Golban – Ceahlăul Piatra Neamț – 2007–2008
- Gheorghe Gondiu – CFR Cluj – 2020–2021
- Dinu Graur – Astra Giurgiu – 2019–2021
- Alexandru Guzun – Rapid București – 1992–1994
- Gheorghe Harea – Rapid București – 1993–1994
- Vasile Jardan – Oțelul Galați – 2023–2024
- Alexei Koșelev – Politehnica Iași – 2017–2018
- Teodor Lungu – Unirea Slobozia, Oțelul Galați – 2025–
- Vladislav Lungu – FC Vaslui – 2005–2006
- Valentin Lupașcu – Oțelul Galați – 1996–1997
- Nicolae Milinceanu – Rapid București, Petrolul Ploiești – 2014–2016
- Petru Neagu – Dinamo București, Unirea Slobozia – 2023–2025
- Ghenadie Ochincă – Gloria Buzău – 2007–2008
- Artur Pătraș – Politehnica Timișoara, Gloria Buzău, Oțelul Galați, Unirea Urziceni – 2006–2007, 2008–2011
- Dan Pîslă – FC Vaslui – 2005–2006
- Virgiliu Postolachi – UTA Arad, CFR Cluj, Universitatea Cluj – 2022–2026
- Dorian Railean – Gloria Buzău – 2024–2025
- Vadim Rață – Chindia Târgoviște, FC Voluntari, FCSB, Universitatea Cluj, Argeș Pitești – 2019–
- Denis Rusu – Politehnica Iași, Unirea Slobozia – 2017–2020, 2024–2026
- Leo Saca – CFR Cluj – 2026–
- Alexei Scala – FCM Bacău – 1992–1993
- Iurie Scala – FCM Bacău – 1992–1993
- Dan Spătaru – Astra Giurgiu, Dinamo București, Politehnica Iași – 2014–2015, 2016–2018
- Nicolae Sula – CFR Cluj – 2026–
- Alexandru Tabuncic – Dinamo București – 2025–2026
- Valeriu Tiron – FC Botoșani − 2014–2015
- Alexandru Vremea – Politehnica Iași – 2017–2018
- Denis Zmeu – FC Vaslui – 2006–2012

== Montenegro ==
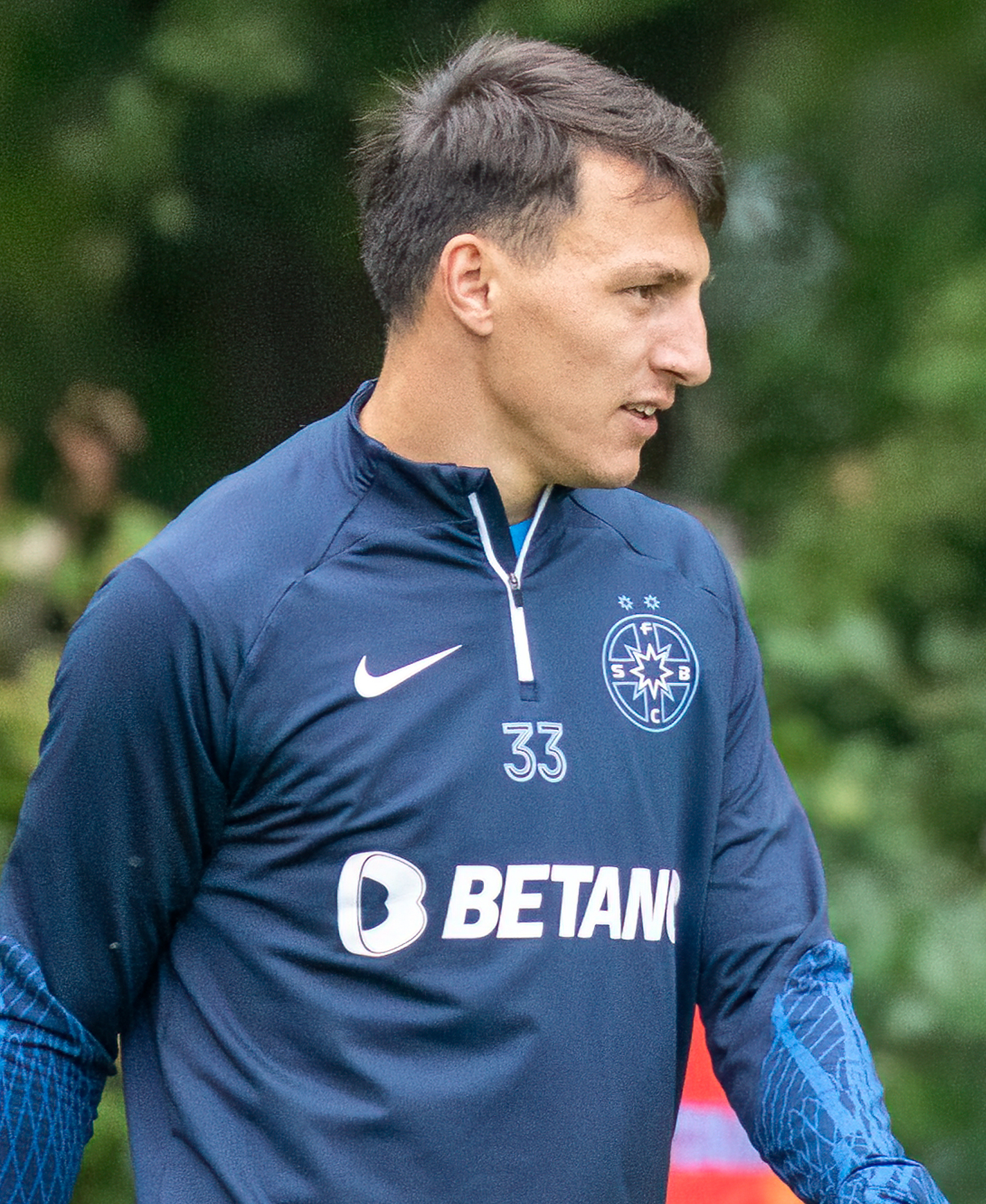
Risto Radunović won two Liga I titles with FCSB and was named the 2024 Foreign Player of the Year.

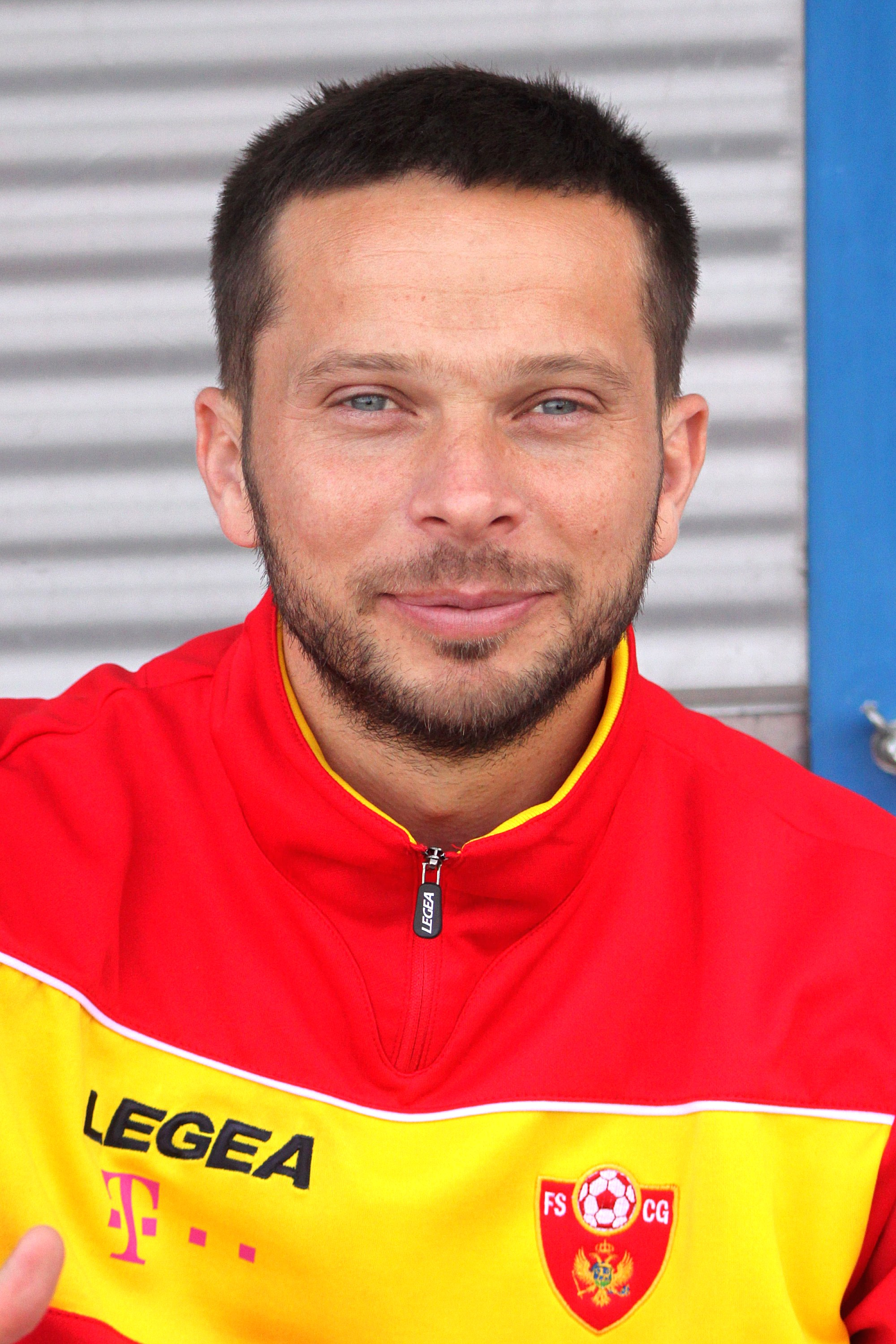
Vladimir Božović spent five years at Rapid București, playing in 131 Liga I games.

- Admir Adrović – Pandurii Târgu Jiu – 2013–2014
- Saša Balić – ASA Târgu Mureș – 2015–2016
- Vladimir Božović – Rapid București – 2007–2013
- Vladan Bubanja – Rapid București – 2026–
- Boris Cmiljanić – Sepsi Sfântu Gheorghe – 2026–
- Radomir Đalović – Rapid București – 2008–2010
- Uroš Đuranović – Politehnica Iași – 2020–2021
- Nenad Đurović – Petrolul Ploiești – 2011–2012
- Vladimir Gluščević – Politehnica Timișoara – 2005–2007
- Sergej Grubač – FC Botoșani, Chindia Târgoviște – 2021–2023
- Milan Jovanović – FC Universitatea Craiova, Unirea Urziceni, Universitatea Cluj – 2004–2005, 2006–2008
- Aleksandar Madžar – FC Vaslui – 2006–2007
- Nemanja Mijušković – FC Hermannstadt – 2018–2019
- Stefan Milošević – UTA Arad – 2022–2023
- Igor Nikić – Argeș Pitești – 2026–
- Stefan Nikolić – Politehnica Timișoara, Steaua București, Sepsi Sfântu Gheorghe – 2010–2014, 2017–2018
- Zoran Petrović – Petrolul Ploiești – 2023–2024
- Aleksandar Radović – Gaz Metan Mediaș – 2012–2013
- **Risto Radunović** – **Astra Giurgiu, FCSB** – 2017–
- Momčilo Raspopović – Astra Giurgiu – 2020–2021
- Stevan Reljić – Concordia Chiajna – 2014–2015
- Marko Roganovic – UTA Arad – 2023–2024
- Milisav Sećković – UTA Arad – 2002–2003
- Nikola Vujadinović – Unirea Alba Iulia – 2009–2010
- Marko Vukčević – UTA Arad – 2021–2023
- Dušan Vuković – Csíkszereda – 2026–

== Morocco ==
- Saifeddine Alami – Rapid București – 2021–2022
- Alaa Bellaarouch – Dinamo București – 2026–
- Khalid Fouhami – Dinamo București – 1998–2000
- Omar El Kaddouri – CFR Cluj – 2023–2024
- Nabil Jaadi – Dinamo București – 2018–2019
- Reda Jaadi – Dinamo București – 2018–2019
- Said Ketlas – Astra Ploiești – 1999–2000
- Aziz Khalouta – Pandurii Târgu Jiu – 2015–2016
- Houssine Kharja – Steaua București – 2015–2016
- Ismail Kouha – Oțelul Galați – 2007–2008
- Anas Tahiri – CFR Cluj – 2021–2022
- Monsef Zerka – Petrolul Ploiești – 2011–2012
- Noureddine Ziyati – Rapid București – 2003–2004

== Mozambique ==
- Eduardo Jumisse – FC Vaslui – 2012–2013
- Paíto – FC Vaslui – 2011–2012

== Netherlands ==
- Anass Achahbar – Sepsi Sfântu Gheorghe – 2019–2023
- Fred Benson – Rapid București – 2014–2015
- Michael Breij – Sepsi Sfântu Gheorghe – 2024–2025
- Kevin Brobbey – Politehnica Iași, Viitorul Constanța, Sepsi Sfântu Gheorghe, Rapid București, UTA Arad, Gloria Buzău – 2019–2025
- Rashid Browne – FC Botoșani – 2014–2016
- Jordy Buijs – Pandurii Târgu Jiu – 2015–2016
- Geoffrey Castillion – Universitatea Cluj – 2014–2015
- Frank Wiafe Danquah – FC Brașov – 2012–2014
- Donovan Deekman – Concordia Chiajna – 2014–2015
- Stuart van Doten – Universitatea Cluj – 2013–2014
- Stanley Elbers – FC Hermannstadt – 2020–2021
- John Goossens – FC Voluntari – 2015–2016
- Ninos Gouriye – Astra Giurgiu – 2015–2016
- Ricky van Haaren – Dinamo București – 2015–2016
- Danny Henriques – FC U Craiova – 2022–2024
- Moussa Kalisse – FCM Târgu Mureș – 2011–2012
- Joeri de Kamps – Sepsi Sfântu Gheorghe – 2026–
- Jeffrey Ket – Pandurii Târgu Jiu – 2016–2017
- Milano Koenders – Concordia Chiajna – 2016–2017
- Romario Kortzorg – ASA Târgu Mureș, Dinamo București, Astra Giurgiu, Concordia Chiajna – 2015–2018
- Bas Kuipers – Viitorul Constanța – 2018–2020
- Lars Kramer – Rapid București – 2025–
- Vlatko Lazić – Astra Giurgiu – 2016–2017
- Kyvon Leidsman – UTA Arad – 2023–2024
- Elvis Manu – Universitatea Cluj – 2023–2024
- Bart Meijers – Petrolul Ploiești – 2022–2024
- Bradley de Nooijer – Viitorul Constanța, Farul Constanța, Gloria Buzău – 2017–2022, 2024–2025
- André Ntambue – Ceahlăul Piatra Neamț – 2013–2014
- Oulad Omar – Academica Clinceni – 2019–2020
- Luís Pedro – ASA Târgu Mureș – 2015–2016
- Shaquill Sno – FC Botoșani, CS Mioveni – 2022–2023
- Desley Ubbink – UTA Arad, Metaloglobus București – 2021–2023, 2025–2026
- Adam Zaian – Petrolul Ploiești – 2026–
- Yassine Zakir – Metaloglobus București – 2025–2026
- Dean Zandbergen – Dinamo București – 2026–
- Sergio Zijler – Universitatea Cluj – 2014–2015

== New Caledonia ==
- Jekob Jeno – Unirea Slobozia – 2025–2026

== New Zealand ==
- Benjamin van den Broek – Universitatea Cluj – 2014–2015
- Glen Moss – Dinamo București – 2006–2007

== Nigeria ==
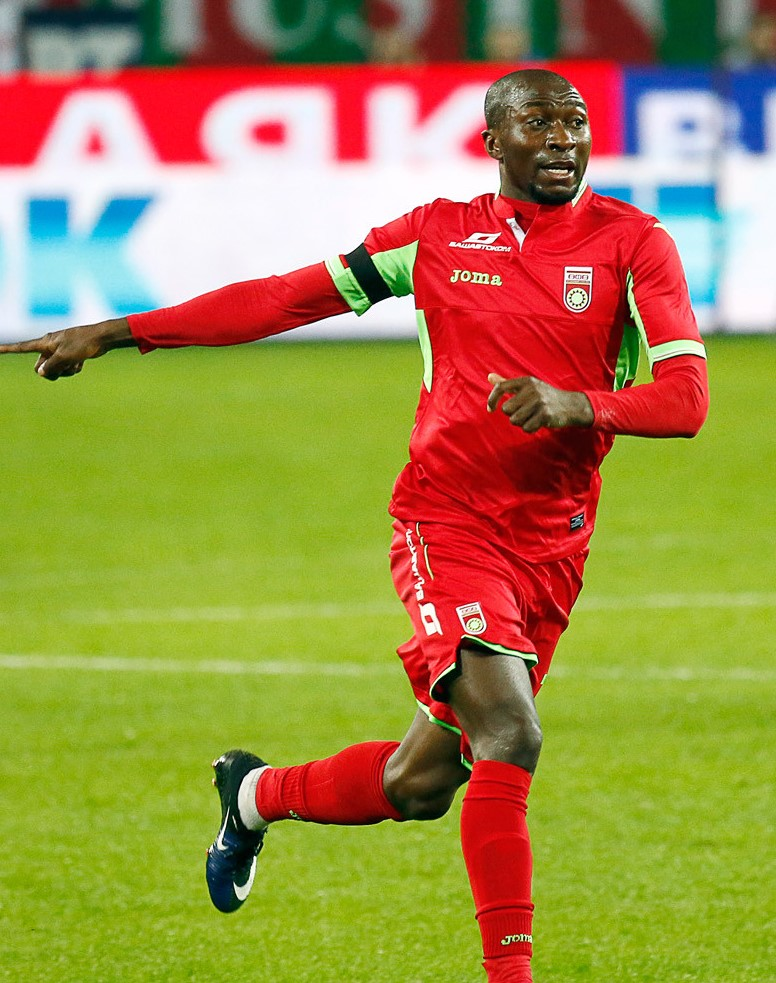
Kehinde Fatai started his senior career at Farul Constanța, and later played for Astra Giurgiu, Argeș Pitești and Oțelul Galați, scoring a total of 46 goals in Liga I.

- Paul Abba – CS Turnu Severin – 2012–2013
- Friday Adams – FC Botoșani, Universitatea Cluj – 2023–
- Jacob Adebanjo – Sepsi Sfântu Gheorghe – 2019–2020
- Olubayo Adefemi – Rapid București – 2008–2009
- Peter Ademo – Rapid București – 2024–2025
- Abiodun Agunbiade – Național București, Politehnica Timișoara, Internațional Curtea de Argeș – 2004–2010
- Goodness Ajayi – Astra Giurgiu – 2019–2020
- Binawari Ajuwa – Național București – 2006–2007
- Kabiru Akinsola – CSMS Iași – 2014–2015
- Joseph Akpala – Dinamo București – 2020–2021
- Oluwatobiloba Alagbe – Argeș Pitești – 2026–
- Kevin Amuneke – Politehnica Timișoara – 2008–2009
- David Ankeye – Rapid București – 2024–2025
- Rabiu Baita – Național București – 2003–2004
- Funsho Bamgboye – Rapid București, Sepsi Sfântu Gheorghe – 2022–2024, 2026–
- Yero Bello – FC Vaslui – 2010–2012
- Ibuchi Chukwu – Universitatea Cluj – 2026–
- Prince Chukwunyere – Oțelul Galați – 2001–2002
- Israel Dele – Petrolul Ploiești – 2026–
- Gideon Ebijitimi – Oțelul Galați – 2001–2002
- Ifeanyi Emeghara – Politehnica Timișoara, Steaua București – 2005–2008, 2009–2012
- Monday Etim – CS Universitatea Craiova – 2025–
- Dino Eze – Gloria Buzău – 2007–2009
- Imoh Ezekiel – UTA Arad – 2023–2025
- Kehinde Fatai – Farul Constanța, Astra Giurgiu, Argeș Pitești, Oțelul Galați – 2007–2009, 2010–2015, 2019–2022, 2023–2024
- Haruna Garba – FC Voluntari – 2020–2021
- Joseph Godwin – UTA Arad – 2022–2023
- Gideon Goodlad – Corvinul Hunedoara – 2026–
- Muhammed Hayatu – Corvinul Hunedoara – 2026–
- John Ibeh – UTA Arad, Oțelul Galați, Pandurii Târgu Jiu – 2008–2013
- Jibril Ibrahim – FC U Craiova – 2022–2024
- Michael Idowu – Argeș Pitești – 2025–
- Christian Irobiso – Gaz Metan Mediaș, Dinamo București, Petrolul Ploiești – 2021–2025
- Jordan Kadiri – UTA Arad – 2024–2025
- Benjamin Kuku – ASA Târgu Mureș, FC Botoșani, Sepsi Sfântu Gheorghe – 2016–2018
- Henry Makinwa – Rapid București – 2002–2003
- Peter Michael – CFR Cluj – 2023–2025
- Ime Ndon – UTA Arad – 2025–2026
- Effiong Nsungusi – UTA Arad – 2024–2025
- Samson Nwabueze – Pandurii Târgu Jiu – 2016–2017
- Anthony Nwakaeme – Universitatea Cluj, Petrolul Ploiești – 2010–2013
- Nwankwo Obiora – CFR Cluj – 2012–2014
- Christian Obodo – Concordia Chiajna, Pandurii Târgu Jiu – 2015–2017
- Michael Odibe – Concordia Chiajna – 2015–2016
- Ibezito Ogbonna – CFR Cluj – 2007–2008
- Derick Ogbu – CFR Cluj – 2013–2014
- Emmanuel Okoro – Corvinul Hunedoara – 2026–
- Samuel Okunowo – Dinamo București – 2003–2004
- Peter Omoduemuke – Politehnica Timișoara, Ceahlăul Piatra Neamț – 2006–2008
- Michael Omoh – Politehnica Iași, Academica Clinceni, Farul Constanța – 2019–2020, 2021–2022
- Gomo Onduku – Concordia Chiajna, CSMS Iași – 2013–2016
- Benjamin Onwuachi – Oțelul Galați – 2014–2015
- Godwin Onyeka – Pandurii Târgu Jiu – 2012–2013
- Wisdom Onyekwere – Național București – 2003–2004
- Philip Otele – UTA Arad, CFR Cluj – 2021–2024
- Junior Pius – FC Botoșani – 2022–2024
- Quadri Taiwo – Universitatea Cluj – 2025–2026
- Michael Tukura – FC Vaslui – 2012–2013
- Simon Zenke – Dinamo București – 2018–2019

== North Macedonia ==
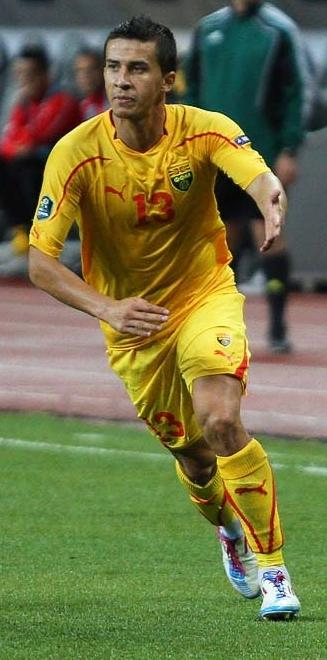
Daniel Georgievski won two Liga I titles with Steaua București.

- Besart Abdurahimi – FC Hermannstadt – 2018–2019
- Isnik Alimi – Sepsi Sfântu Gheorghe – 2023–2025
- Din Alomerovikj – UTA Arad – 2025–
- Viktor Angelov – FC Voluntari – 2020–2022
- Stefan Aškovski – FC Botoșani, Sepsi Sfântu Gheorghe – 2019–2023
- David Atanaskoski – Politehnica Iași – 2024–2025
- David Babunski – FC Botoșani, Viitorul Constanța – 2019–2021
- Dorian Babunski – Sepsi Sfântu Gheorghe – 2024–2025
- Egzon Belica – Concordia Chiajna – 2012–2013
- Mite Cikarski – Gaz Metan Mediaș – 2018–2020
- Hristijan Dragarski – Concordia Chiajna – 2014–2015
- Imran Fetai – Dinamo București – 2026–
- Jane Gavalovski – FC Universitatea Craiova – 2004–2005
- Daniel Georgievski – Steaua București – 2012–2014
- Slavčo Georgievski – CFR Cluj – 2004–2005
- Marko Gjorgjievski – CFR Cluj, FC Hermannstadt – 2025–2026
- Filip Gligorov – Dunărea Călărași – 2018–2019
- Stojan Ignatov – Politehnica Iași – 2008–2010
- Dejan Iliev – UTA Arad, Rapid București – 2024–2026
- Blazhe Ilijoski – FC Brașov, Rapid București – 2011–2013
- Mirko Ivanovski – Astra Giurgiu, CFR Cluj, Dinamo București, Petrolul Ploiești – 2012–2015, 2021–2023
- Risto Jankov – Politehnica Iași – 2023–2024
- Hristijan Kirovski – FC Vaslui – 2008–2009
- Gjorgji Mojsov – Oțelul Galați – 2009–2010
- Kristijan Naumovski – Dinamo București – 2010–2015
- Nderim Nexhipi – FC Vaslui – 2012–2013
- Boban Nikolov – Viitorul Constanța, FCSB, Farul Constanța – 2012–2015, 2022–2023, 2025–2026
- Petar Petkovski – FC Botoșani – 2021–2023
- Milovan Petrovikj – Sepsi Sfântu Gheorghe – 2017–2018
- Agron Rufati – Academica Clinceni – 2021–2022
- Dušan Savić – FC Brașov – 2009–2010
- Jurica Siljanoski – Bihor Oradea – 2003–2004
- Marko Simonovski – Sepsi Sfântu Gheorghe, FC Voluntari – 2017–2020
- Aco Stojkov – FC Botoșani – 2013–2014
- Filip Timov – Concordia Chiajna – 2014–2015
- Todor Todoroski – Politehnica Iași – 2023–2025
- Blagoja Todorovski – Dinamo București – 2007–2008
- Darko Velkovski – Dinamo București – 2023–2024
- Krste Velkoski – Ceahlăul Piatra Neamț – 2009–2010
- Gjoko Zajkov – CS Universitatea Craiova – 2022–2025
- Suat Zendeli – Petrolul Ploiești – 2011–2012

== Norway ==
- Tobias Christensen – Rapid București – 2024–2026
- Hasan Jahić – Petrolul Ploiești – 2024–2025
- Gudmund Kongshavn – Dinamo București – 2020–2021
- Moses Mawa – Sepsi Sfântu Gheorghe – 2026–

== Palestine ==
- Assad Al Hamlawi – CS Universitatea Craiova – 2025–

== Panama ==
- Armando Cooper – Oțelul Galați, Dinamo București – 2013–2014, 2018–2019
- Jaime Penedo – Dinamo București – 2016–2019

== Paraguay ==
- Miguel Cuéllar – CFR Cluj – 2006–2007
- César Meza – CS Universitatea Craiova – 2018–2019
- David Meza – Argeș Pitești – 2020–2023
- José Montiel – Politehnica Iași – 2008–2009

== Peru ==
- Cristian Benavente – Gloria Buzău – 2024–2025
- Renato Espinosa – Unirea Slobozia, Corvinul Hunedoara – 2025–
- John Galliquio – Dinamo București – 2007–2008
- Andrés Mendoza – Steaua București – 2007–2008
- Julio Landauri – FC Brașov – 2009–2010

== Philippines ==
- Daisuke Sato – Politehnica Iași, Sepsi Sfântu Gheorghe – 2016–2019
- Álvaro Silva – Petrolul Ploiești – 2011–2012

== Poland ==
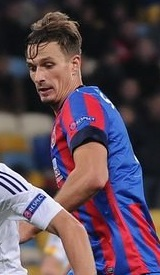
Łukasz Szukała won three consecutive Liga I titles with Steaua București and was the Liga I Foreign Player of the Year in 2014.

- Kamil Biliński – Dinamo București – 2013–2015
- Piotr Celeban – FC Vaslui – 2012–2014
- Adrian Cierpka – CS Mioveni – 2021–2023
- Łukasz Gikiewicz – FCSB – 2019–2020
- Michał Gliwa – Pandurii Târgu Jiu – 2013–2015
- Janusz Gol – Dinamo București – 2020–2021
- Paweł Golański – Steaua București, ASA Târgu Mureș – 2007–2010, 2015–2016
- Rafał Grzelak – Steaua București – 2009–2010
- Łukasz Kubik – Argeș Pitești – 2003–2004
- Piotr Polczak – Astra Giurgiu – 2017–2018
- Sebastian Rudol – Sepsi Sfântu Gheorghe – 2018–2019
- Grzegorz Sandomierski – CFR Cluj – 2019–2021
- Łukasz Szukała – Gloria Bistrița, Universitatea Cluj, Petrolul Ploiești, Steaua București – 2010–2015
- Paweł Tomczyk – CS Mioveni – 2021–2022
- Jakub Wilk – FC Vaslui – 2013–2014
- Hubert Wołąkiewicz – Astra Giurgiu – 2014–2015

== Portugal ==
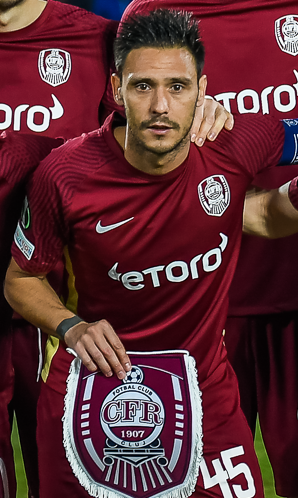
Mário Camora, who won six Liga I titles with CFR Cluj, also gained Romanian citizenship and represented Romania’s national team internationally.

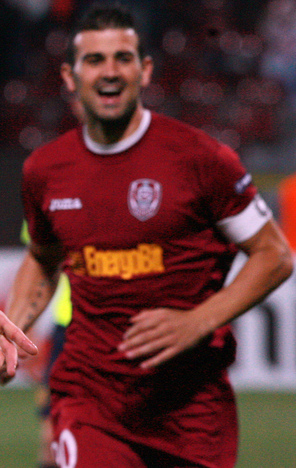
Ricardo Cadú won a hat-trick of Liga I titles with CFR Cluj.

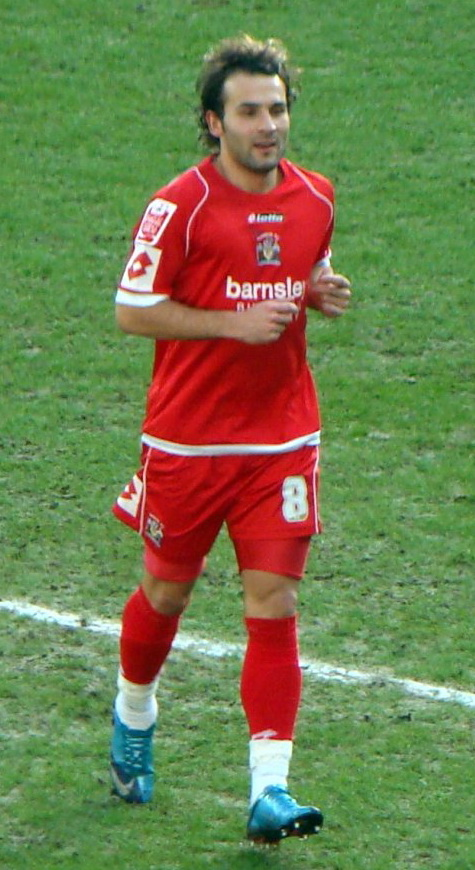
Filipe Teixeira played for five different Liga I clubs and won the title with Astra Giurgiu.

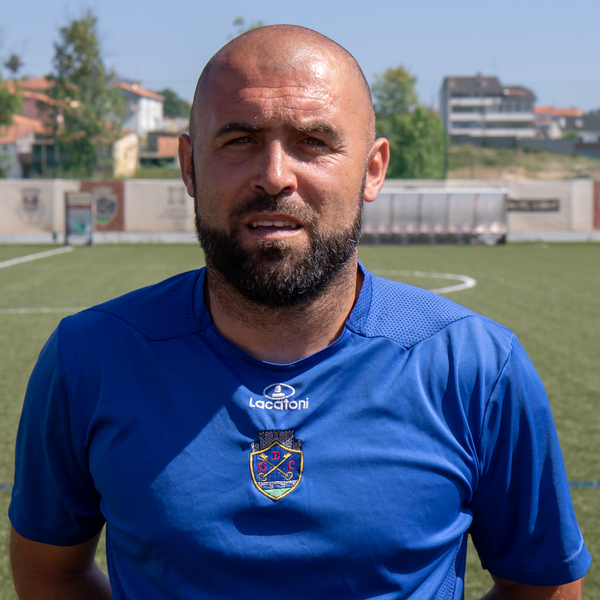
Tony won two Liga I titles with CFR Cluj.

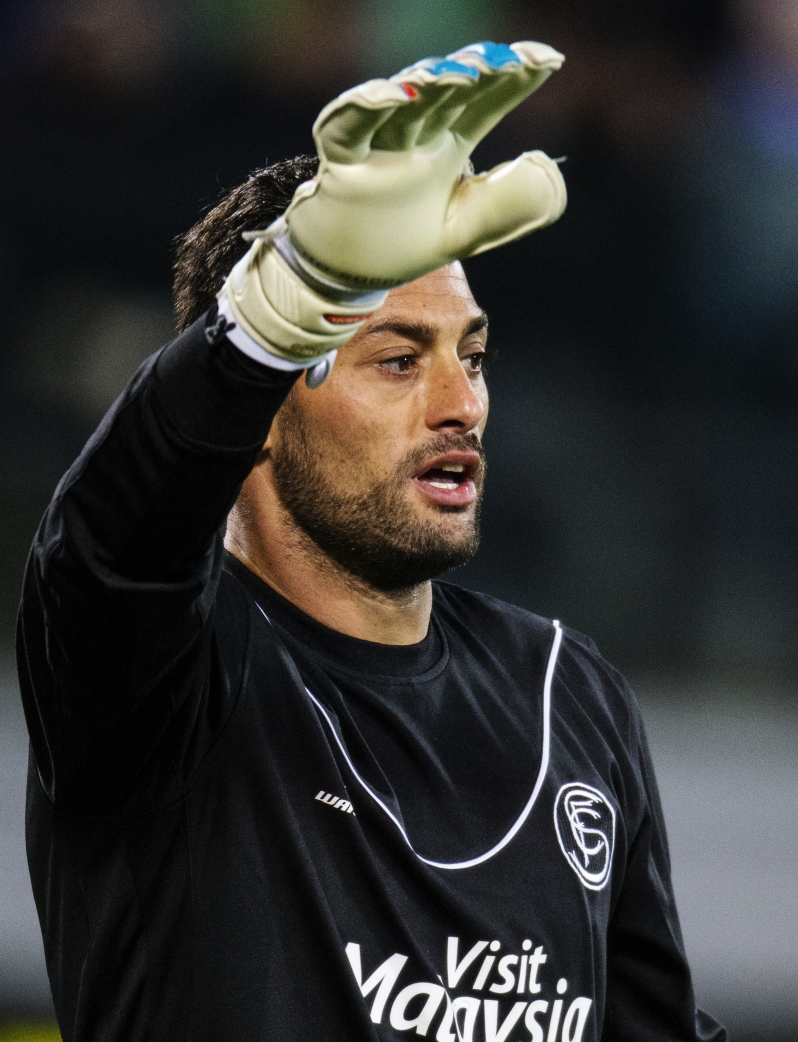
International goalkeeper Beto won the Liga I title in his sole season at CFR Cluj.

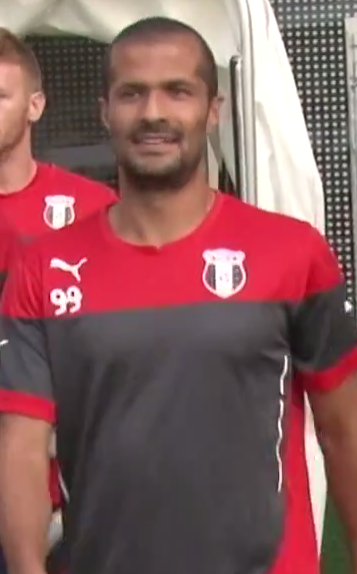
Geraldo Alves spent the last years of his career playing for three teams in Liga I, winning the title with Astra Giurgiu.

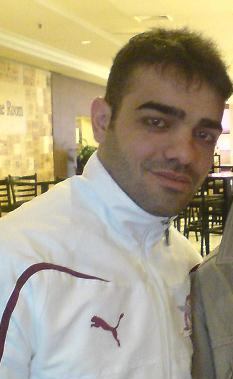
Rui Duarte appeared in over 100 Liga I matches for FC Brașov and Rapid București.

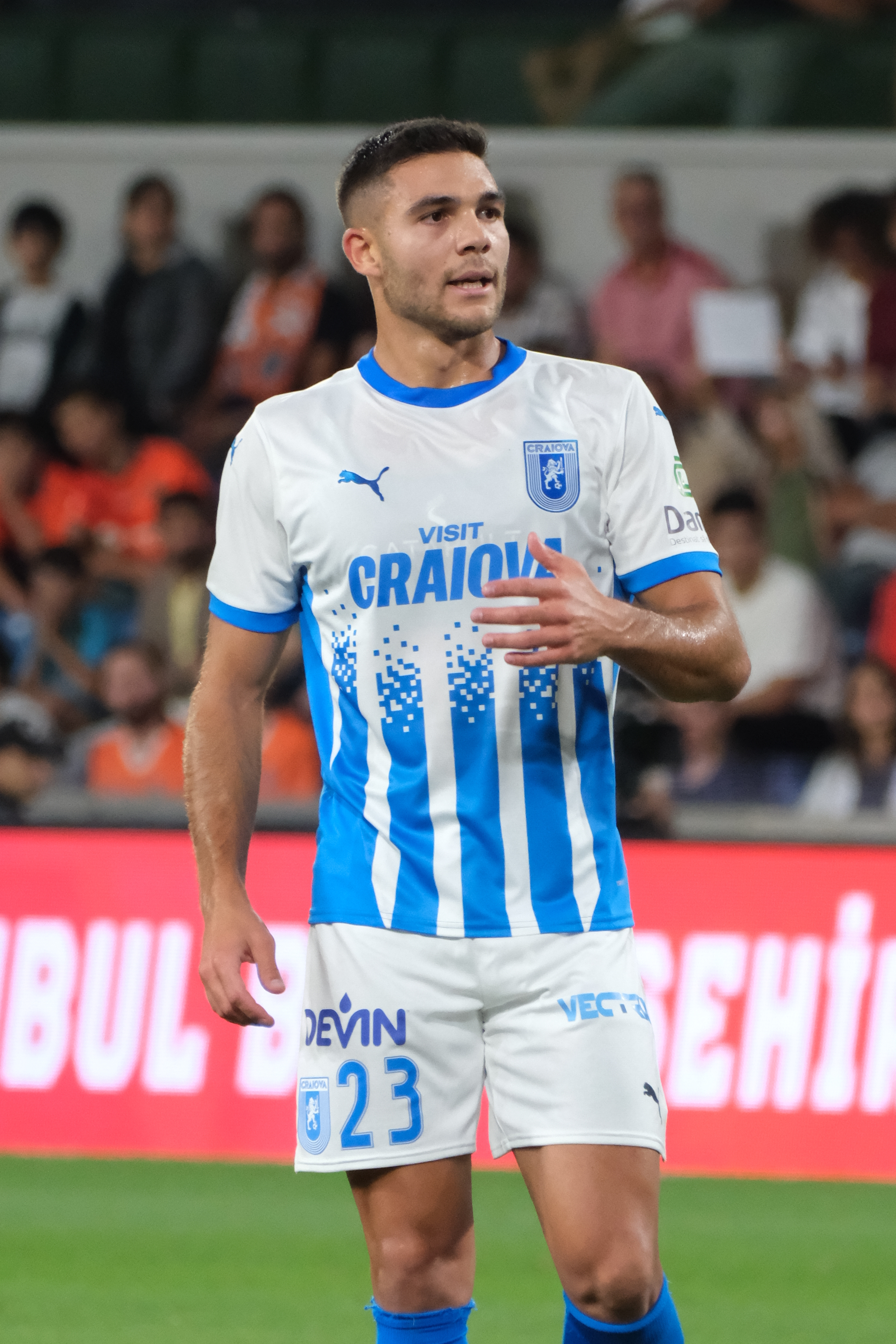
Samuel Teles won the Liga I title with CS Universitatea Craiova.

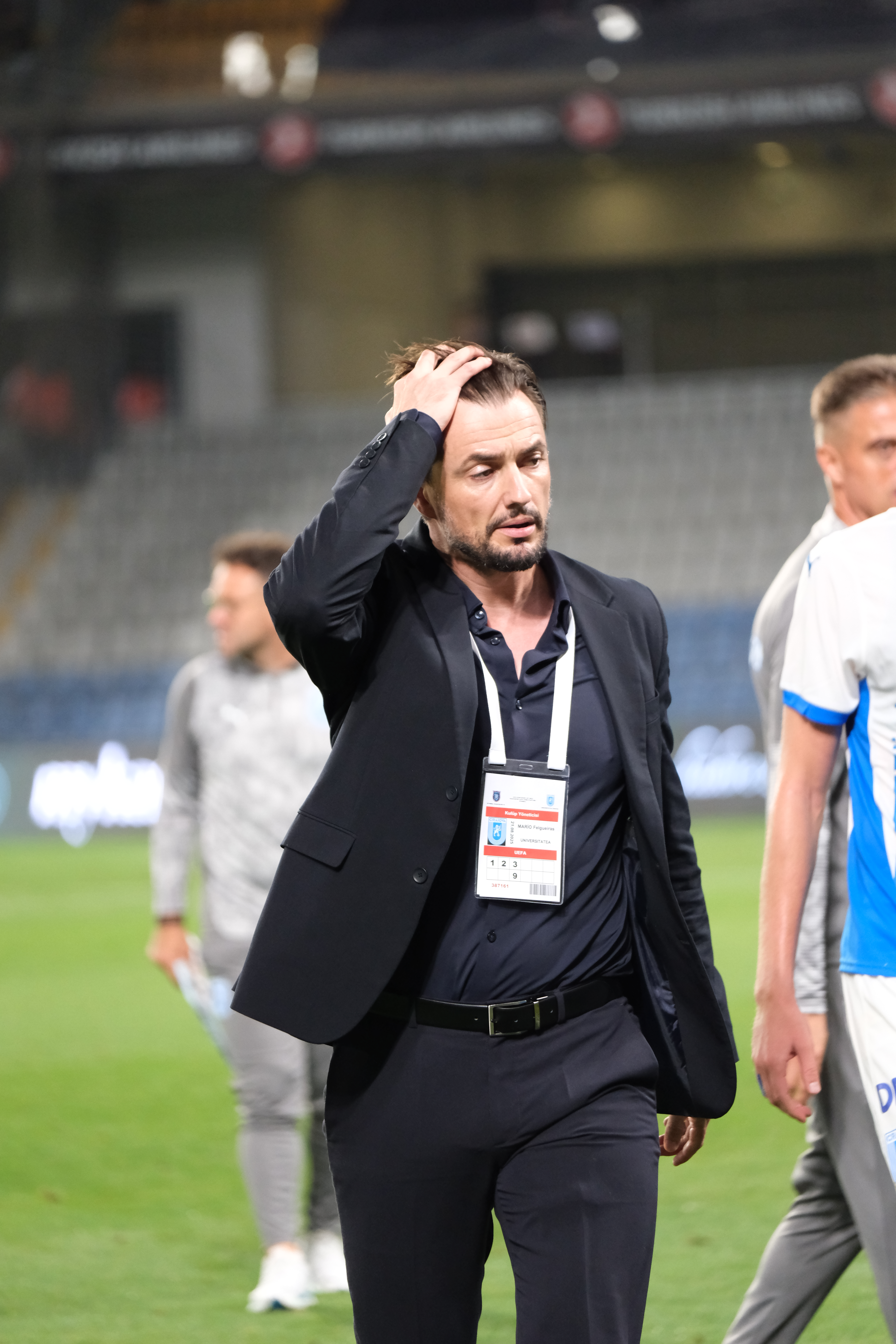
Mário Felgueiras spent four seasons in Liga I, one with FC Brașov and three with CFR Cluj.

- Paulo Adriano – FC Brașov – 2008–2009
- Pedro Albino – Corvinul Hunedoara – 2026–
- João Pedro Almeida – UTA Arad – 2023–2025
- Geraldo Alves – Steaua București, Petrolul Ploiești, Astra Giurgiu – 2010–2017
- Ricardo Alves – Concordia Chiajna, Astra Giurgiu – 2014–2017
- Ricardo Alves Silva – Rapid București – 2014–2015
- João Amaral – Politehnica Iași – 2024–2025
- Eurípedes Amoreirinha – CFR Cluj, UTA Arad – 2007–2008
- Diogo Andrade – UTA Arad – 2007–2008
- João Paulo Andrade – Rapid București – 2008–2009
- Andrezinho – Oțelul Galați – 2025–
- Luís Aurélio – Gaz Metan Mediaș, CFR Cluj – 2018–2021
- João Pedro Azevedo – Gloria Bistrița – 2008–2009
- Fábio Baptista – Farul Constanța – 2024–2026
- Diogo Batista – FC Hermannstadt – 2025–2026
- Ricardo Batista – Gaz Metan Mediaș – 2018–2020
- Beto – CFR Cluj – 2011–2012
- Fábio Braga – CSMS Iași – 2014–2015
- Jaime Bragança – FC Vaslui, Gloria Bistrița, Corona Brașov – 2011–2014
- Gonçalo Brandão – CFR Cluj – 2013–2014
- Rúben Brígido – Oțelul Galați – 2014–2015
- Rafael Brito – Oțelul Galați – 2026–
- David Bruno – Astra Giurgiu – 2019–2021
- Vítor Bruno – CFR Cluj – 2015–2016
- Ricardo Cadú – CFR Cluj – 2006–2014
- David Caiado – Gaz Metan Mediaș, FC Hermannstadt – 2017–2021
- **Mário Camora** – **CFR Cluj** – 2011–
- Mário Carlos – Farul Constanța – 2005–2006
- Hélder Castro – ASA Târgu Mureș – 2014–2015
- Pedro Celestino – CFR Cluj – 2011–2013
- Chico – Farul Constanța – 2007–2009
- Nuno Claro – CFR Cluj, ACS Poli Timișoara – 2007–2012, 2013–2014
- Dani Coelho – CFR Cluj – 2015–2016
- João Coimbra – Rapid București – 2014–2015
- Bruno Costa – CFR Cluj – 2026–2027
- Cândido Costa – Rapid București – 2010–2011
- Dani – CFR Cluj – 2006–2011
- Davide Dias – FC Brașov, FC Vaslui – 2011–2014
- Luís Dias – Gloria Buzău – 2008–2009
- João Diogo – Gaz Metan Mediaș – 2017–2018
- Nuno Diogo – CS Otopeni, FC Brașov, CFR Cluj – 2008–2013
- Bocar Djumo – Oțelul Galați – 2013–2014
- André Duarte – FC U Craiova, FCSB – 2022–2023, 2025–
- Rui Duarte – FC Brașov, Rapid București – 2008–2013
- Danny Esteves – Academica Clinceni – 2019–2020
- Filipe Falardo – Gloria Buzău – 2008–2009
- Mário Felgueiras – FC Brașov, CFR Cluj – 2011–2015
- Daniel Fernandes – CFR Cluj – 2011–2012
- Ricardo Fernandes – Rapid București – 2008–2010
- Vasco Fernandes – Pandurii Târgu Jiu – 2015–2016
- Tiago Ferreira – CS Universitatea Craiova – 2017–2020
- Vitó Ferreira – Gloria Buzău – 2024–2025
- Cristiano Figueiredo – FC Hermannstadt, Dinamo București – 2019–2022
- Diogo Fonseca – FC Brașov – 2013–2014
- Rúben Fonseca – FC Hermannstadt – 2023–2024
- Fábio Fortes – FC Hermannstadt – 2020–2021
- Fredy – CFR Cluj – 2006–2008
- Nuno Gomes – FC Vaslui – 2006–2007
- Tiago Gomes – Steaua București – 2008–2009
- Tiago Gonçalves – FC Hermannstadt, Argeș Pitești – 2024–2025, 2026–
- Gonçalo Gregório – Dinamo București – 2023–2024
- Guima – CFR Cluj – 2014–2017
- Boubacar Hanne – Argeș Pitești – 2022–2023
- Marian Huja – Petrolul Ploiești – 2022–2026
- Diogo Izata – Gaz Metan Mediaș – 2021–2022
- Joãozinho – Astra Giurgiu – 2014–2015
- Artur Jorge – FCSB – 2017–2018
- Paulo Jorge – Gaz Metan Mediaș – 2017–2018
- Manuel José – CFR Cluj – 2006–2009
- Edinho Júnior – Gaz Metan Mediaș – 2017–2018
- Kikas – Rapid București – 2014–2015
- **João Lameira** – Oțelul Galați, **CS Universitatea Craiova** – 2023–
- André Leão – CFR Cluj – 2007–2010
- Sérgio Leite – FC Vaslui – 2006–2007
- Né Lopes – Oțelul Galați – 2025–
- Marcelo Lopes – FC Voluntari – 2020–2024
- Tiago Lopes – CFR Cluj – 2013–2017
- Jucie Lupeta – Argeș Pitești, FC Botoșani – 2021–2022
- Hugo Luz – FC Vaslui – 2007–2012
- Pedro Machado – FC U Craiova – 2021–2022
- Ricardo Machado – FC Brașov, Dinamo București – 2011–2015
- Frédéric Maciel – Oțelul Galați – 2023–2025
- Bruno Madeira – FC Brașov, Concordia Chiajna – 2011–2017
- Sérgio Marakis – Argeș Pitești – 2020–2021
- Daniel Martins – Universitatea Cluj – 2014–2015
- Rodrigo Martins – Petrolul Ploiești – 2026–
- Ricardo Matos – Gloria Buzău, Argeș Pitești – 2024–
- Vasco Matos – Rapid București – 2007–2008
- João Meira – Concordia Chiajna – 2018–2019
- Pedro Mendes – Politehnica Iași, Gaz Metan Mediaș – 2017–2019
- André Micael – Gaz Metan Mediaș – 2018–2019
- Bruno Miguel – Astra Giurgiu – 2011–2012
- João Miguel – Argeș Pitești – 2021–2022
- Rui Miguel – Astra Giurgiu, Rapid București – 2011–2012, 2014–2015
- Carlos Milhazes – Politehnica Timișoara – 2007–2009
- Pedro Mingote – Pandurii Târgu Jiu, ASA Târgu Mureș, CS Universitatea Craiova, SC Juventus București – 2007–2018
- Pedro Moreira – FC Hermannstadt – 2018–2019
- Hugo Moutinho – CS Turnu Severin, CSMS Iași – 2012–2013
- Pedro Moutinho – FC Brașov – 2011–2012
- Thierry Moutinho – CFR Cluj, FCSB – 2017–2020
- Filipe Nascimento – CFR Cluj, Dinamo București, Politehnica Iași – 2015–2019
- Emanuel Novo – FC Hermannstadt – 2019–2020
- Pedro Nuno – Oțelul Galați – 2025–
- Filipe Oliveira – Sepsi Sfântu Gheorghe – 2017–2018
- Pedro Oliveira – CFR Cluj, UTA Arad – 2006–2008
- Marco Osório – Pandurii Târgu Jiu – 2005–2006
- Paulinho – Astra Ploiești, Concordia Chiajna, Universitatea Cluj, Pandurii Târgu Jiu, Oțelul Galați – 2009–2015
- Paulinho – Oțelul Galați – 2025–2026
- Rui Pedro – CFR Cluj – 2011–2014
- Carlos Pintassilgo – Pandurii Târgu Jiu – 2007–2008
- Miguel de Pina – Gloria Bistrița – 2010–2011
- Ivo Pinto – CFR Cluj – 2012–2013
- João Paulo Pinto – Rapid București – 2007–2010
- Pedro Pinho – Universitatea Cluj – 2026–
- André Pinto – Dinamo București – 2021–2022
- Diogo Pinto – Dinamo București – 2026–
- Nuno Pinto – Astra Giurgiu – 2014–2015
- Cristian Ponde – Unirea Slobozia – 2025–2026
- Diogo Queirós – Farul Constanța – 2023–2025
- Pedro Queirós – Gloria Bistrița, Astra Giurgiu – 2008–2009, 2015–2016
- Diogo Ramalho – Farul Constanța – 2025–2026
- Diogo Ramos – Gloria Bistrița – 2008–2010
- Sérgio Ribeiro – Corvinul Hunedoara – 2026–
- Ricardinho – FC Voluntari, Petrolul Ploiești – 2018–
- **Simão Rocha** – **CFR Cluj** – 2024–
- Diogo Rodrigues – UTA Arad, Petrolul Ploiești – 2023–
- Nuno Rodrigues – FC Voluntari – 2026–
- Diogo Rosado – Gaz Metan Mediaș – 2017–2018
- Pedro Russiano – Gloria Buzău – 2008–2009
- Diogo Salomão – Dinamo București, FCSB – 2017–2020
- Idrisa Sambú – Gaz Metan Mediaș – 2020–2021
- André Santos – CS Universitatea Craiova – 2017–2018
- Diogo Santos – FC Brașov – 2013–2015
- Miguel Santos – Astra Giurgiu, Academica Clinceni – 2018–2020
- Pedro Santos – Astra Giurgiu – 2013–2014
- António Semedo – CFR Cluj, Steaua București, Unirea Urziceni – 2006–2011
- Serginho – FC Brașov, Dinamo București – 2013–2015
- André Seruca – Farul Constanța – 2025–2026
- Cláudio Silva – Politehnica Iași – 2024–2025
- Diogo Silva – Gloria Buzău, FC Brașov – 2008–2009, 2011–2012
- Edson Silva – UTA Arad, Ceahlăul Piatra Neamț – 2006–2008, 2009–2010
- **Miguel Silva** – Oțelul Galați, Universitatea Cluj – 2023–
- Bruno Simão – UTA Arad, Dinamo București, Astra Ploiești – 2006–2010
- Guilherme Soares – Politehnica Iași, Petrolul Ploiești – 2024–2026
- Hugo Sousa – FC Brașov, Astra Giurgiu, Sepsi Sfântu Gheorghe – 2011–2012, 2020–2022
- Pedro Taborda – Politehnica Timișoara, FC Brașov – 2008–2011, 2012–2013
- Afonso Taira – FC Hermannstadt – 2019–2020
- Jorge Tavares – Gloria Buzău – 2008–2009
- Filipe Teixeira – FC Brașov, Rapid București, Petrolul Ploiești, Astra Giurgiu, FCSB – 2010–2019
- Gonçalo Teixeira – Politehnica Iași – 2024–2025
- João Teixeira – Politehnica Iași – 2018–2020
- Léo Teixeira – Petrolul Ploiești – 2026–
- Samuel Teles – Oțelul Galați, CS Universitatea Craiova – 2023–
- Tony – CFR Cluj – 2006–2011
- Diogo Valente – CFR Cluj – 2012–2013
- Ricardo Valente – Gaz Metan Mediaș – 2020–2021
- Diogo Viana – Argeș Pitești – 2021–2022
- Fábio Vianna – Argeș Pitești, Farul Constanța, Sepsi Sfântu Gheorghe – 2022–2024, 2026–
- Hugo Vieira – FC U Craiova – 2021–2022
- Vitinha – CFR Cluj, CS Otopeni, Unirea Alba Iulia, Concordia Chiajna – 2006–2007, 2008–2010, 2011–2012
- Nuno Viveiros – Politehnica Iași, FC Brașov, FC Vaslui, Universitatea Cluj, CSMS Iași – 2008–2016
- Yazalde – Astra Giurgiu, Gaz Metan Mediaș, FC Hermannstadt – 2013–2014, 2018–2021
- Zé Gomes – Universitatea Cluj – 2022–2023
- Zé Manuel – Gaz Metan Mediaș – 2020–2021
- Zé Pedro – UTA Arad – 2024–2025

== Russia ==
- Rasambek Akhmatov – Chindia Târgoviște, Gloria Buzău, Unirea Slobozia – 2022–2023, 2024–2025
- Valentin Filatov – Unirea Urziceni – 2006–2007
- Amir Natkho – Viitorul Constanța – 2018–2019
- Yevgeni Shlyakov – UTA Arad – 2020–2022

== Rwanda ==
- Samuel Gueulette – UTA Arad – 2026–
- Jimmy Mulisa – Ceahlăul Piatra Neamț – 2009–2010

== Saint Lucia ==
- Éric Fanis – Foresta Suceava – 1997–1999, 2000–2001

== Saudi Arabia ==
- Naif Hazazi – FC Botoșani – 2017–2018

== Scotland ==
- Daniel Armstrong – Dinamo București – 2025–
- Scott Robertson – FC Botoșani – 2015–2016
- Nick Ross – Sepsi Sfântu Gheorghe – 2017–2018

== Senegal ==
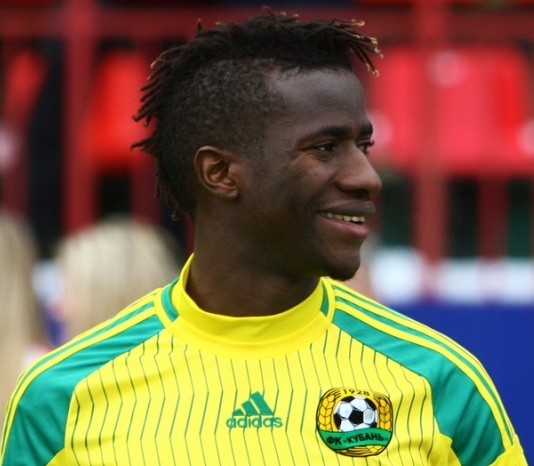
Ibrahima Baldé won a Liga I title with CFR Cluj.

- Abdoulaye Ba – Dinamo București – 2020–2021
- Issa Ba – FCM Târgu Mureș, Gaz Metan Mediaș, Dinamo București – 2010–2013
- Papa Malick Ba – Dinamo București – 2008–2009
- Ibrahima Baldé – CFR Cluj – 2017–2018
- Oumar Diakhité – Sepsi Sfântu Gheorghe – 2019–2020
- Djibril Diaw – FC Botoșani – 2025–
- Pape Seydou Diop – Dinamo București – 2002–2003
- Lys Gomis – ACS Poli Timișoara – 2015–2016
- Magaye Gueye – Dinamo București – 2020–2021
- Mansour Gueye – Politehnica Timișoara, Gloria Buzău, ACS Poli Timișoara – 2004–2011, 2013–2014
- Mouhamadou Keita – Gloria Buzău – 2024–2025
- Souleymane Keita – Gloria Bistrița, CSMS Iași, ACS Poli Timișoara – 2009–2011, 2012–2014
- Boubacar Mansaly – Dinamo București, Astra Giurgiu – 2012–2017
- Gaston Mendy – Farul Constanța, Universitatea Cluj, Petrolul Ploiești, Rapid București, ASA Târgu Mureș, Dunărea Călărași – 2007–2009, 2010–2015, 2016–2017, 2018–2019
- Mamadou Mendy – Argeș Pitești – 2026–
- Pape N'Daw – Dinamo București – 2013–2014
- Ousmane N'Doye – FC Vaslui, Dinamo București, Astra Ploiești, Săgeata Năvodari, ASA Târgu Mureș – 2007–2016
- Moustapha Name – CFR Cluj – 2024–2025
- Mediop Ndiaye – Dunărea Călărași, Argeș Pitești – 2018–2019, 2020–2021
- Ibrahima Niasse – Concordia Chiajna – 2015–2016
- Mor Pouye – Gloria Bistrița – 2012–2013
- Khadim Rassoul – UTA Arad – 2024–2025
- Christian Sagna – Gloria Buzău – 2008–2009
- Adama Sarr – Gaz Metan Mediaș – 2020–2022
- Modou Sougou – CFR Cluj – 2011–2013
- Emile Paul Tendeng – FC Vaslui – 2012–2013
- Mamadou Thiam – Universitatea Cluj, FCSB – 2022–2023, 2024–2026
- Ousmane Thiandoum – Farul Constanța – 2002–2003
- Issa Thiaw – Sepsi Sfântu Gheorghe – 2017–2018
- Demba Touré – Astra Ploiești – 2011–2012

== Serbia ==
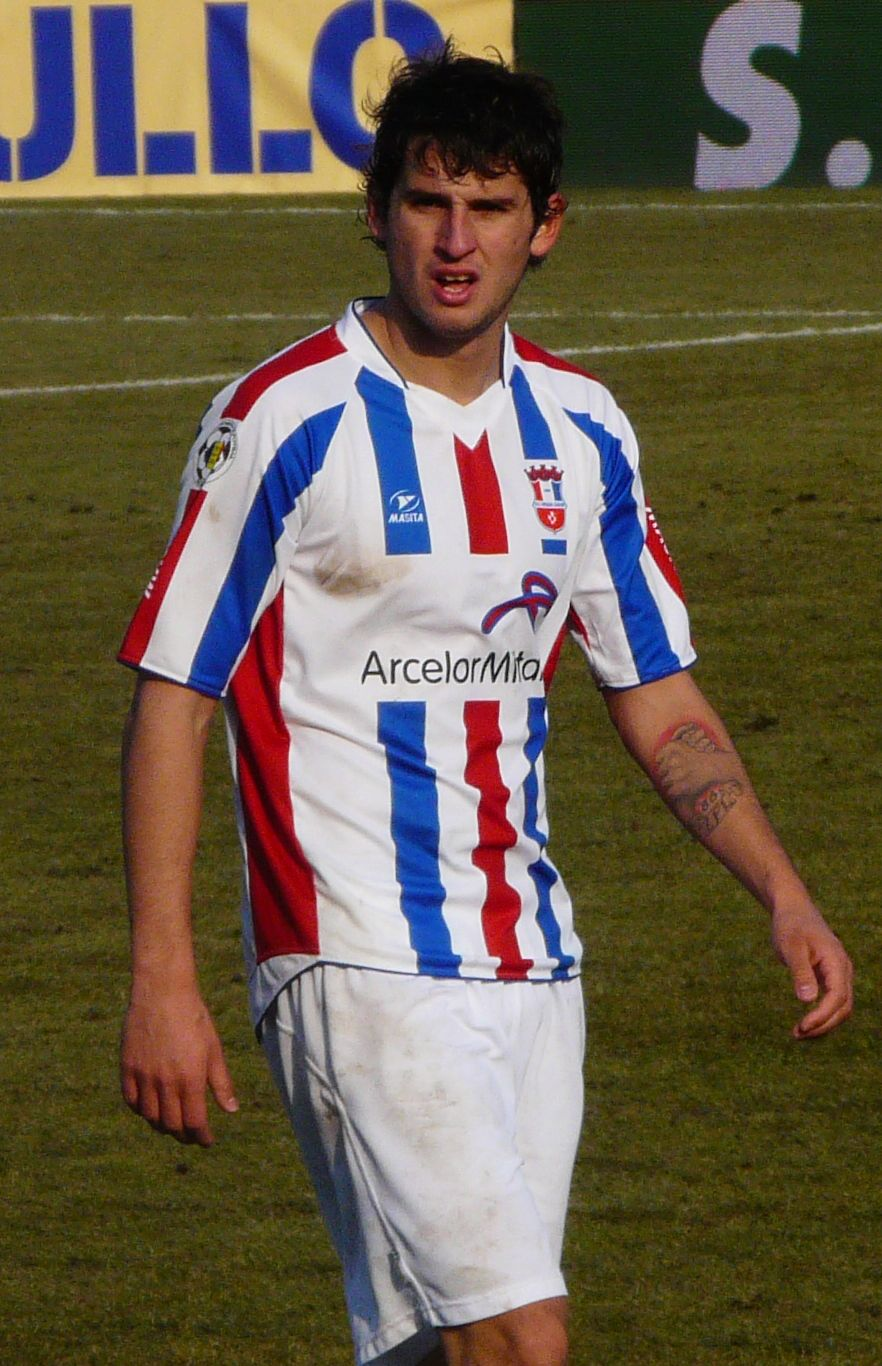
Milan Perendija won the Liga I title with Oțelul Galați.

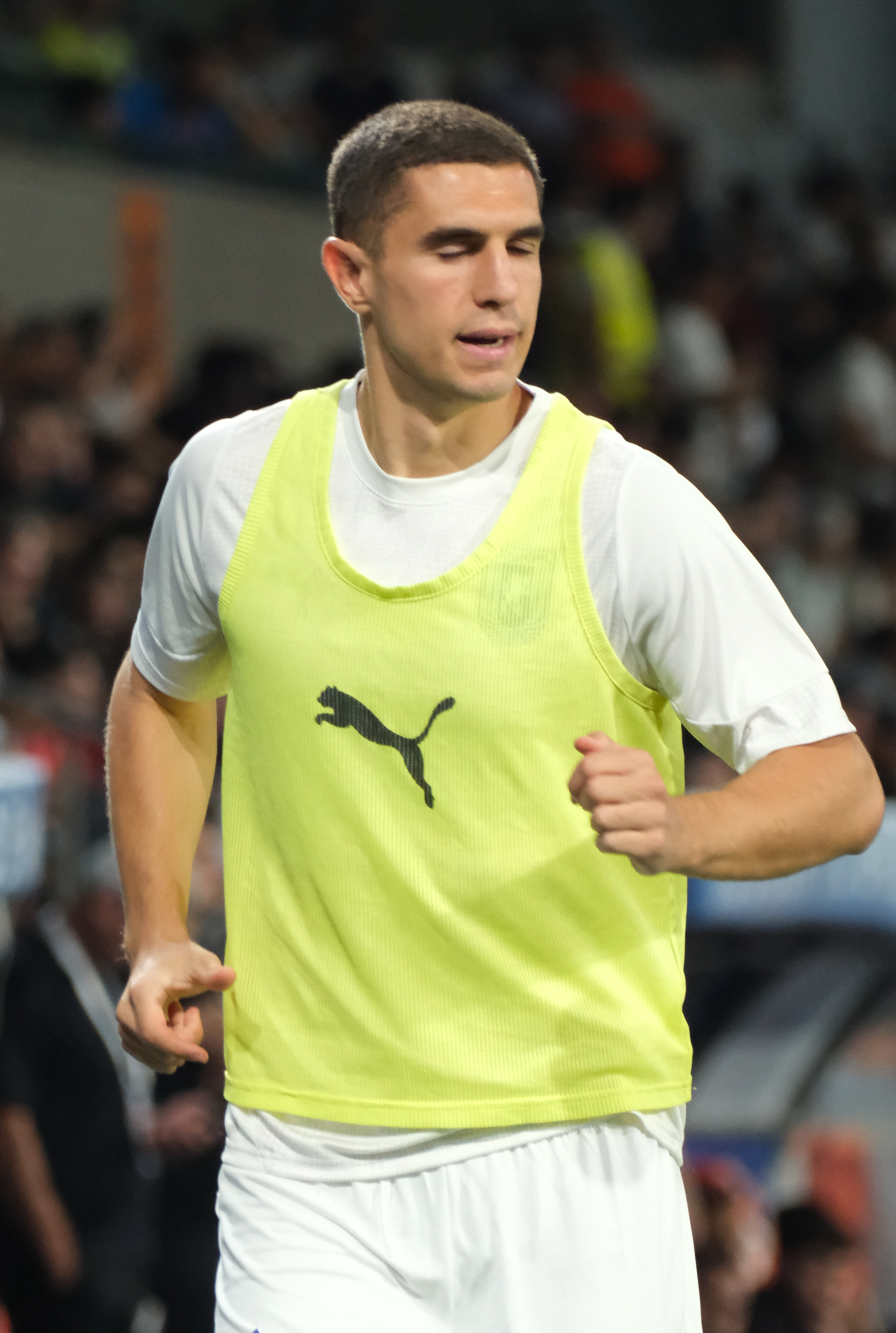
International Nikola Stevanović won the Liga I title with CS Universitatea Craiova.

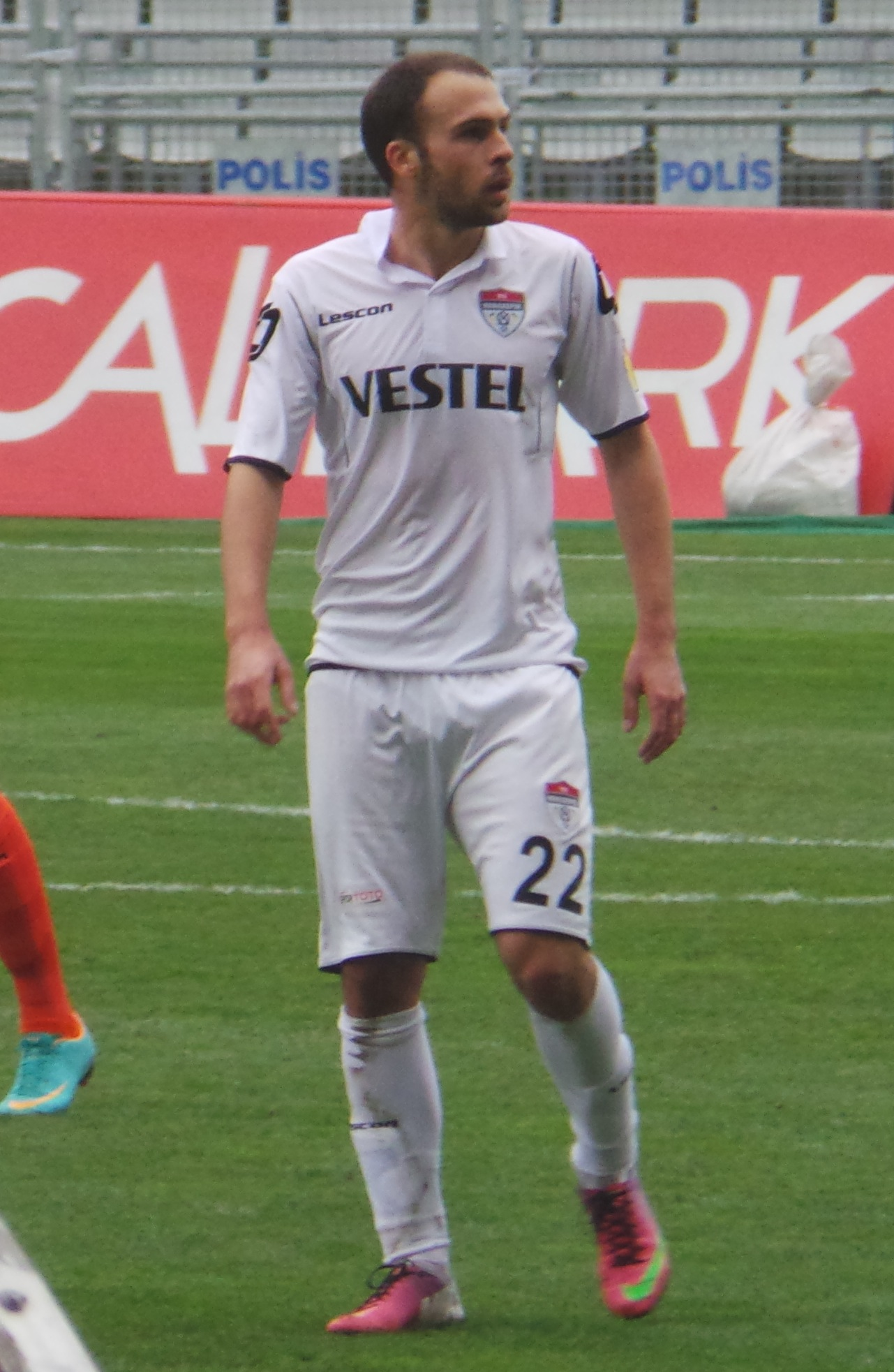
Slavko Perović played briefly in Liga I for Dinamo București.

- Marko Anđelković – Viitorul Constanța – 2014–2015
- Miodrag Anđelković – Pandurii Târgu Jiu, Internațional Curtea de Argeș – 2008–2010
- Nikola Antić – Gaz Metan Mediaș – 2013–2014
- Branko Baković – Politehnica Iași – 2007–2008
- Marko Basara – Pandurii Târgu Jiu – 2009–2010
- Zoran Belošević – Politehnica Timișoara, Universitatea Cluj – 2003–2004, 2010–2011
- Miloš Bogdanović – Rapid București, Farul Constanța, Ceahlăul Piatra Neamț, Politehnica Iași – 2001–2006
- Petar Bojić – Sepsi Sfântu Gheorghe – 2021–2022
- Bojan Brać – CS Universitatea Craiova – 2014–2015
- Dušan Brojčin – Bihor Oradea – 2003–2004
- Sead Brunčević – CFR Cluj, Gloria Bistrița – 2004–2007
- Milorad Bukvić – Oțelul Galați, Argeș Pitești, FC Vaslui – 2000–2003, 2005–2008
- **Borisav Burmaz** – **Rapid București** – 2023–
- Dušan Čelar – Dinamo București – 2021–2022
- Boban Cenić – Universitatea Cluj – 2010–2011
- Sava-Arangel Čestić – FC Voluntari – 2026–
- Uroš Ćosić – CS Universitatea Craiova – 2019–2020
- Slaviša Čula – Dinamo București – 1996–1997
- Goran Cvetković – Gloria Bistrița – 2005–2006
- Ádám Czékus – Csíkszereda – 2026–
- Miloš Deletić – Săgeata Năvodari – 2013–2014
- Ranko Despotović – Rapid București – 2007–2008
- Dušan Đokić – Astra Ploiești – 2009–2010
- Ivan Đoković – UTA Arad – 2006–2008
- Stefan Dražić – CFR Cluj – 2026–
- Milan Đurić – Rapid București, Politehnica Timișoara – 2003–2004
- Vasilije Đurić – Oțelul Galați – 2024–2025
- Marko Gajić – FC U Craiova – 2021–2022
- Luka Gojković – Rapid București, UTA Arad – 2024–2026
- Njegoš Goločevac – Oțelul Galați – 2009–2010
- Dragan Gošić – Farul Constanța – 2007–2009
- Ivan Gvozdenović – Dinamo București – 2007–2008
- Sead Hadžibulić – Gloria Bistrița – 2007–2008
- Stefan Hajdin – Sepsi Sfântu Gheorghe – 2024–2025
- Nikola Ignjatijević – Politehnica Timișoara – 2010–2011
- Radiša Ilić – Național București – 2003–2004
- Mihajlo Ivančević – Corvinul Hunedoara – 2026–
- Đorđe Ivelja – Rapid București – 2008–2010
- Goran Janković – UTA Arad – 2006–2007
- Slaviša Jeremić – Ceahlăul Piatra Neamț – 2009–2010
- Nemanja Jovanović – Argeș Pitești, Pandurii Târgu Jiu, Universitatea Cluj, FC Vaslui, Unirea Alba Iulia – 2003–2004, 2006–2010
- Bojan Jović – Ceahlăul Piatra Neamț – 2011–2015
- Nikola Jozić – Gloria Buzău – 2007–2008
- Sead Kolašinac – CFR Cluj – 2004–2005
- Nikola Komazec – Petrolul Ploiești – 2011–2012
- Predrag Lazić – CS Otopeni, Pandurii Târgu Jiu – 2008–2010
- Leo Lerinc – Dinamo București – 2006–2007
- Marko Ljubinković – FC Vaslui – 2006–2010
- Zoran Ljubinković – Oțelul Galați – 2011–2013
- Darko Marić – FC Brașov – 2004–2005
- Miloš Marković – Ceahlăul Piatra Neamț – 2014–2015
- Neven Marković – FC Vaslui – 2008–2010
- Žarko Marković – Gaz Metan Mediaș – 2008–2014
- Marko Marović – Gaz Metan Mediaș, ACS Poli Timișoara – 2009–2011, 2013–2014
- Novak Martinović – Pandurii Târgu Jiu, Steaua București – 2008–2013
- Ersin Mehmedović – Politehnica Timișoara, Național București, Unirea Urziceni, Dinamo București – 2004–2011
- Dejan Mičić – Național București – 2001–2003
- Miloš Mihajlov – Politehnica Iași – 2009–2010
- Svetozar Mijin – CFR Cluj, Politehnica Iași – 2004–2008
- Nemanja Milisavljević – FC Vaslui, Rapid București – 2008–2013
- Uroš Milosavljević – UTA Arad – 2006–2007
- Zoran Milošević – CFR Cluj, Argeș Pitești – 2004–2007
- Milan Mitić – CS Turnu Severin, Politehnica Iași, Gaz Metan Mediaș – 2012–2013, 2014–2018
- Dalibor Mitrović – Argeș Pitești – 2006–2007
- Marko Momčilović – Pandurii Târgu Jiu, FCSB – 2013–2020
- Danijel Morariju – ACS Poli Timișoara – 2013–2014
- Ahmed Mujdragić – Gaz Metan Mediaș – 2014–2015
- Saša Nedeljković – FC Universitatea Craiova – 1996–1997
- Mihajlo Nešković – Sepsi Sfântu Gheorghe – 2024–2025
- Veljko Nikitović – FC Vaslui – 2007–2008
- Ivan Paunović – FC Universitatea Craiova – 2009–2010
- Miloš Pavlović – FC Vaslui, Rapid București – 2008–2013
- Nino Pekarić – Dinamo București – 2007–2008
- Milan Perendija – Oțelul Galați, Gaz Metan Mediaș – 2009–2013, 2017–2018
- Dragan Perišić – Pandurii Târgu Jiu – 2005–2006
- Slavko Perović – Dinamo București – 2019–2020
- Dejan Pešić – FC Brașov, FC Vaslui – 2004–2006
- Aleksandar Petrović – Petrolul Ploiești, Concordia Chiajna, ACS Poli Timișoara – 2011–2012, 2013–2014
- Ivan Petrović – CSMS Iași – 2012–2013
- Bogdan Planić – Steaua București – 2017–2020
- Pavle Popara – Astra Ploiești – 2010–2011
- Saša Popin – Pandurii Târgu Jiu, Săgeata Năvodari – 2012–2014
- Milos Popović – CS Otopeni – 2008–2009
- Bratislav Punoševac – Oțelul Galați – 2010–2013
- Stefan Purtić – Petrolul Ploiești – 2022–2024
- Danilo Pustinjaković – Pandurii Târgu Jiu – 2005–2006
- Branko Radovanović – UTA Arad – 2007–2008
- Kenan Ragipović – Gloria Bistrița – 2007–2008
- Predrag Ranđelović – FC Universitatea Craiova – 2003–2004
- Milanko Rašković – Pandurii Târgu Jiu – 2008–2010
- Anes Rušević – Oțelul Galați – 2023–2024
- Dejan Rusmir – Ceahlăul Piatra Neamț, Farul Constanța – 2006–2009
- Vladimir Sandulović – Național București – 2006–2007
- Aleksandar Sarić – Politehnica Timișoara – 2002–2003
- Boban Savić – Rapid București – 2002–2003
- Dušan Šimić – Ceahlăul Piatra Neamț – 2006–2007
- Sreten Sretenović – Politehnica Timișoara – 2008–2009
- Sreten Stanić – Politehnica Timișoara, Dinamo București – 2005–2007
- Jug Stanojev – Universitatea Cluj – 2025–
- Rajko Stanković – Național București – 2005–2006
- Aleksandar Stefanović – Bihor Oradea – 2003–2004
- Borislav Stevanović – FC Universitatea Craiova – 2004–2005
- **Nikola Stevanović** – **Oțelul Galați**, CS Universitatea Craiova – 2024–
- Aleksandar Stoimirović – Petrolul Ploiești – 2011–2012
- Boban Stojanović – UTA Arad – 2006–2007
- Saša Stojanović – Universitatea Cluj – 2014–2015
- Dejan Tričković – Argeș Pitești – 2000–2001
- Jasmin Trtovac – Gloria Bistrița, Gaz Metan Mediaș – 2007–2008, 2010–2015, 2016–2017
- Nikola Trujić – FC Botoșani – 2018–2019
- Nikola Vasiljević – UTA Arad – 2006–2008
- Nikola Vasiljević – Pandurii Târgu Jiu – 2014–2017
- Srđan Vasiljević – Dinamo București – 2000–2001
- Rade Veljović – CFR Cluj, Unirea Alba Iulia, FCM Târgu Mureș – 2008–2011
- Nemanja Vidaković – Pandurii Târgu Jiu, Gaz Metan Mediaș – 2006–2007, 2008–2009
- Stefan Višić – Metaloglobus București – 2025–2026
- Đorđe Vlajić – CFR Cluj – 2004–2005
- Vojislav Vranjković – Pandurii Târgu Jiu, Dinamo București, Ceahlăul Piatra Neamț, CS Turnu Severin, Corona Brașov – 2005–2011, 2012–2014
- Ivan Vukadinović – Gaz Metan Mediaș – 2010–2013
- Branislav Vukomanović – Farul Constanța – 2008–2009
- Srđan Žakula – Unirea Urziceni – 2007–2008
- Miloš Živković – FC Botoșani – 2013–2014

== Sierra Leone ==
- Musa Kallon – Sportul Studențesc București – 1995–1996
- Jonathan Morsay – Dinamo București – 2020–2021
- Julius Wobay – FC Universitatea Craiova – 2006–2011

== Slovakia ==
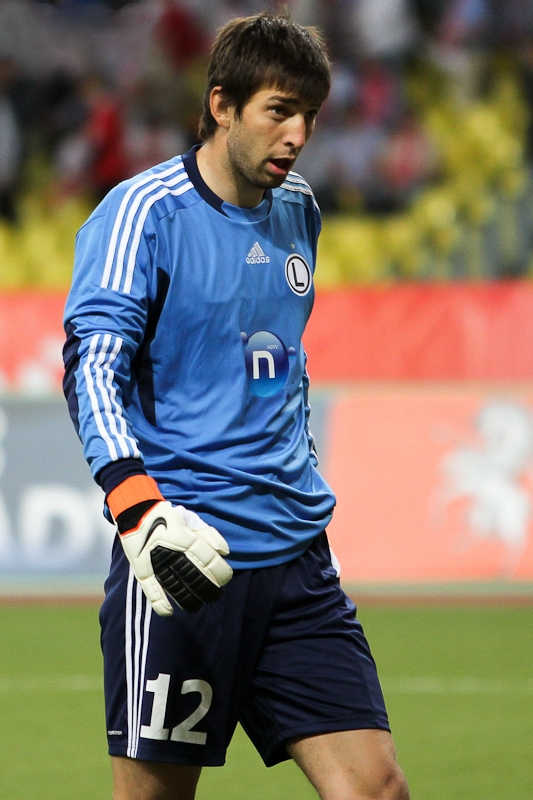
International goalkeeper Dušan Kuciak had a three-year spell in Liga I at FC Vaslui.

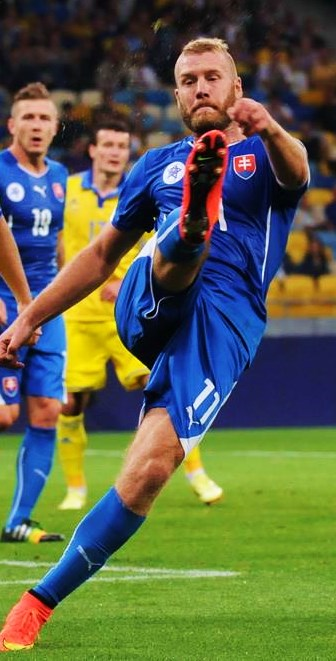
International Adam Nemec scored 47 goals in Liga I for Dinamo București and FC Voluntari.

- Filip Blažek – Rapid București, Unirea Slobozia – 2024–2026
- Balázs Borbély – Politehnica Timișoara – 2007–2010
- Miloš Brezinský – Politehnica Timișoara – 2007–2010
- Marián Čišovský – Politehnica Timișoara – 2008–2011
- Peter Čvirik – Universitatea Cluj – 2010–2011
- Jozef Dolný – Csíkszereda – 2025–
- **Andrej Fábry** – UTA Arad, Universitatea Cluj, Corvinul Hunedoara – 2023–
- Pavol Farkaš – FC Vaslui – 2008–2012
- Peter Gál-Andrezly – Sepsi Sfântu Gheorghe, Csíkszereda – 2019–2021, 2025–2026
- Jakub Hromada – Rapid București – 2023–2027
- Timotej Jambor – Rapid București – 2024–
- Karol Karlík – Oțelul Galați – 2014–2015
- Marián Kello – Astra Giurgiu – 2012–2013
- Kristián Koštrna – Dinamo București – 2019–2020
- Ján Kozák – Politehnica Timișoara – 2009–2010
- Michal Kubala – Gaz Metan Mediaș, Astra Ploiești – 2008–2012
- Dušan Kuciak – FC Vaslui – 2008–2011
- Peter Majerník – FC Brașov – 2010–2012
- Adam Nemec – Dinamo București, FC Voluntari – 2016–2018, 2020–2024
- Branislav Niňaj – Sepsi Sfântu Gheorghe – 2020–2025
- Ivan Pecha – Ceahlăul Piatra Neamț, Oțelul Galați – 2007–2008, 2014–2015
- Boris Peškovič – CFR Cluj – 2009–2010
- Jaroslav Prekop – Gaz Metan Mediaș – 2010–2011
- Pavol Šafranko – Sepsi Sfântu Gheorghe – 2019–2021, 2022–2024
- Lukáš Skovajsa – Dinamo București – 2019–2020
- Denis Ventúra – Academica Clinceni – 2019–2022
- Robert Veselovsky – Universitatea Cluj – 2013–2015
- Tomáš Vestenický – Dinamo București – 2021–2022
- Jakub Vojtuš – Academica Clinceni, CFR Cluj, Rapid București, Politehnica Iași, Unirea Slobozia, Farul Constanța – 2019–2021, 2023–
- Jan Zolna – FC Vaslui – 2006–2007

== Slovenia ==
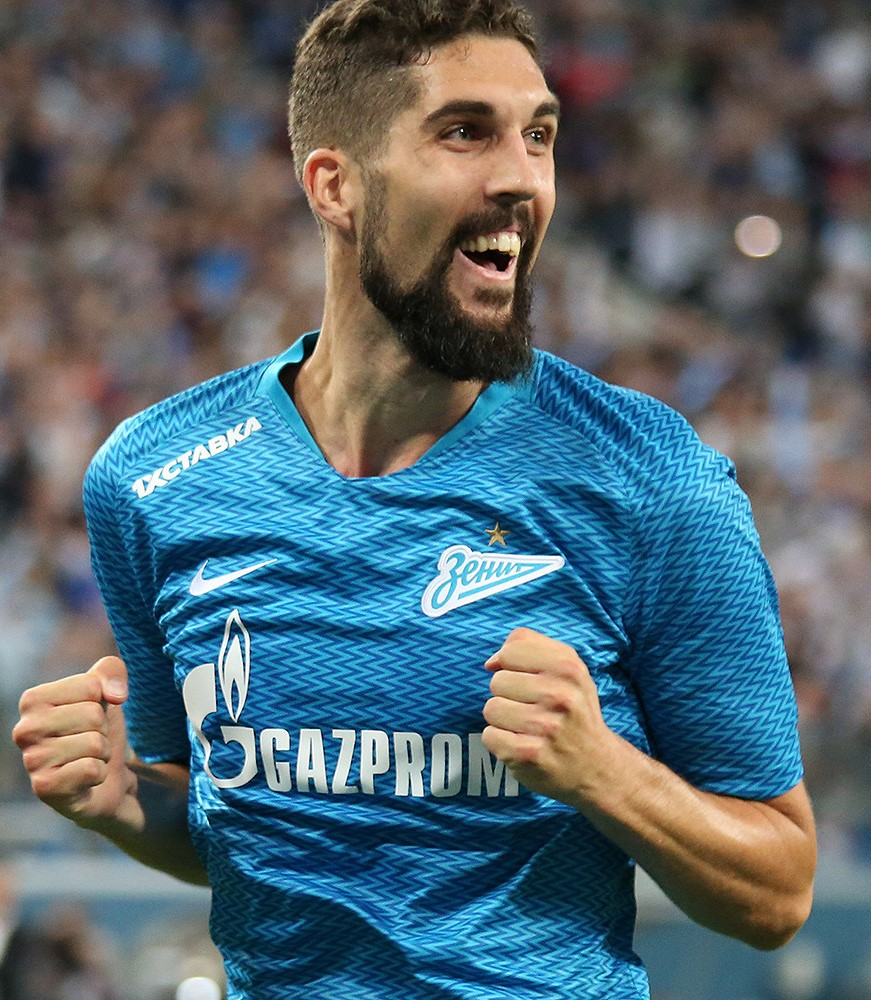
Miha Mevlja made his international debut for Slovenia during his spell at Dinamo București.

- Dominik Beršnjak – Politehnica Iași – 2007–2010
- Matija Boben – CFR Cluj, Politehnica Iași – 2023–2025
- Adnan Golubović – Dinamo București – 2023–2025
- Metod Jurhar – FC Voluntari – 2026–
- Milan Kocić – FC Voluntari, Chindia Târgoviște – 2019–2022
- Rok Kronaveter – Petrolul Ploiești – 2014–2015
- Nino Kukovec – Csíkszereda – 2026–
- Alin Kumer – Rapid București – 2026–
- Jasmin Kurtić – CS Universitatea Craiova – 2023–2024
- Anej Lovrečič – FC Vaslui – 2013–2014
- Darijan Matić – Rapid București – 2009–2010
- Miha Mevlja – Dinamo București – 2015–2017
- Nejc Mevlja – Pandurii Târgu Jiu – 2014–2015
- Marko Nunić – Dinamo București – 2021–2022
- Jan Pahor – Farul Constanța – 2008–2009
- Michael Pavlovič – FC Botoșani – 2024–2026
- Andrej Pečnik – Politehnica Iași – 2007–2010
- Andrej Rastovac – Farul Constanța – 2008–2009
- Rajko Rep – Sepsi Sfântu Gheorghe – 2021–2022
- Dejan Rusič – Politehnica Timișoara – 2007–2009
- Nejc Skubic – Oțelul Galați – 2011–2012
- Jaka Štromajer – Pandurii Târgu Jiu, Oțelul Galați – 2007–2013
- Andraž Struna – FC Voluntari – 2019–2020
- Nikola Tolimir – Ceahlăul Piatra Neamț – 2012–2013
- Dare Vršič – Politehnica Timișoara – 2007–2010
- Luka Zahović – CFR Cluj – 2025–2027

== South Africa ==
- May Mahlangu – Dinamo București – 2016–2019
- **Siyabonga Ngezana** – **FCSB** – 2023–

== South Korea ==
- Kim Gil-sik – Oțelul Galați – 2006–2008
- Park Jae-hong – Universitatea Cluj – 2007–2008

== Spain ==
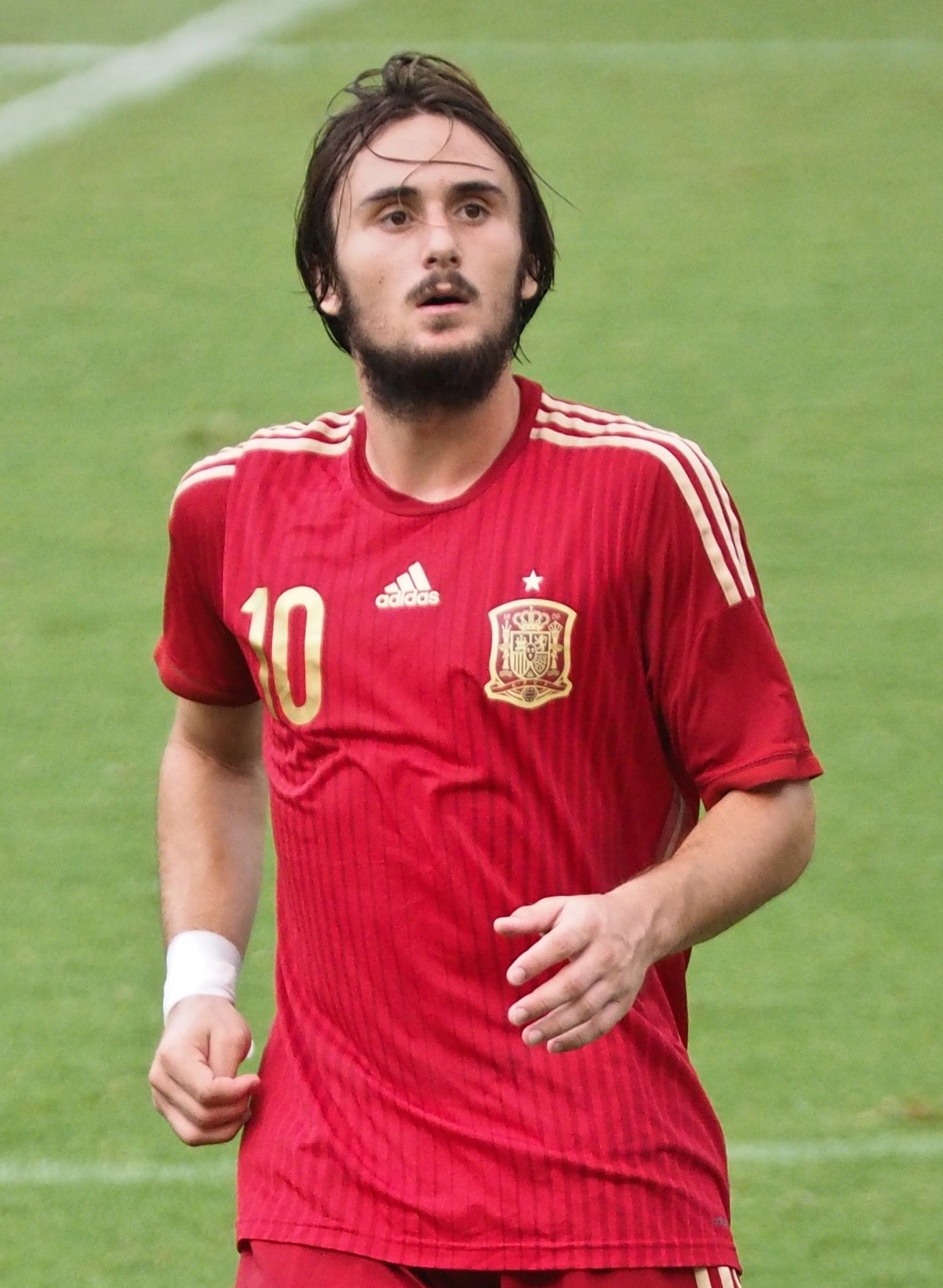
International Aleix García played briefly in Liga I for Dinamo București.

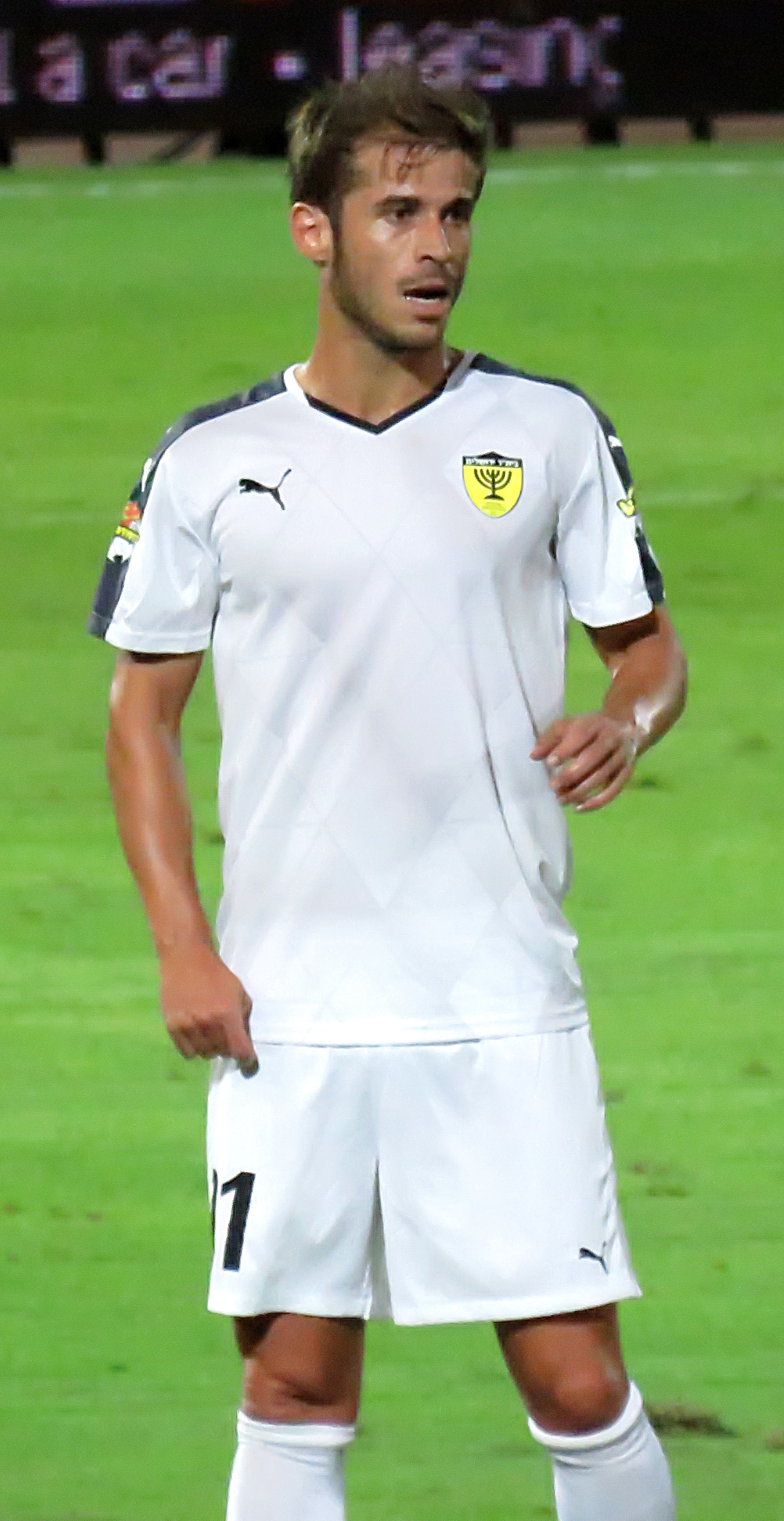
Pablo de Lucas played over 100 Liga I matches for four teams.

- Noé Acosta – Universitatea Cluj – 2010–2011
- Aloisio – Ceahlăul Piatra Neamț – 2012–2013
- Raúl Albentosa – Dinamo București – 2020–2021
- Ibón Pérez Arrieta – Pandurii Târgu Jiu – 2007–2010
- Alfonso Artabe – FC Voluntari – 2018–2019
- Ángel Bastos – FC Hermannstadt – 2020–2021
- Darío Benavides – Dinamo București – 2026–
- Jefté Betancor – FC Voluntari, Farul Constanța, CFR Cluj – 2020–2024
- Jalen Blesa – CS Universitatea Craiova – 2023–2024
- David Bollo – Academica Clinceni – 2019–2020
- Aritz Borda – Rapid București – 2014–2015
- Josemi Castañeda – Viitorul Constanța, Farul Constanța – 2020–2022
- Juan Cámara – Dinamo București, CS Universitatea Craiova – 2020–2021
- Alejandro Campano – FC Vaslui – 2010–2011
- Raúl del Campo – Gaz Metan Mediaș – 2010–2011
- Fernando Carralero – FC Botoșani – 2015–2016
- José Casado – FC Botoșani – 2015–2016
- Carlos Casquero – FCM Târgu Mureș – 2010–2011
- Biel Company – FC Hermannstadt – 2018–2019
- Albert Dalmau – Sepsi Sfântu Gheorghe – 2017–2018
- Roberto Delgado – FC Vaslui, Universitatea Cluj – 2009–2011
- Didac Devesa – Politehnica Iași – 2019–2020
- Álex Díez – FC Botoșani – 2024–2025
- Edu Espada – FCM Târgu Mureș – 2010–2011
- Jesús Fernández – CFR Cluj, Sepsi Sfântu Gheorghe, FC Voluntari, Politehnica Iași – 2018–2021, 2022–2025
- Victor Fernández – Viitorul Constanța, FC Botoșani – 2020–2021
- Walter Fernández – Petrolul Ploiești – 2013–2014
- Fonsi – Săgeata Năvodari – 2013–2014
- Adrià Gallego – Politehnica Iași – 2018–2020
- Aritz López Garai – Rapid București – 2014–2015
- Aleix García – Dinamo București – 2020–2021
- Boris Garrós – Politehnica Iași – 2018–2019
- Jon Gaztañaga – Viitorul Constanța – 2020–2021
- Abel Gómez – Steaua București – 2008–2009
- Eder González – Sepsi Sfântu Gheorghe – 2020–2022
- Iván González – ASA Târgu Mureș – 2014–2016
- Emilio Guerra – Săgeata Năvodari – 2013–2014
- Nacho Heras – Argeș Pitești, Sepsi Sfântu Gheorghe – 2025–
- Javi Hernández – ACS Poli Timișoara – 2015–2016
- Dani Iglesias – Dinamo București – 2023–2024
- Soufiane Jebari – Csíkszereda – 2025–
- Rubén Jurado – ASA Târgu Mureș – 2015–2016
- Gorka Larrucea – Dinamo București – 2023–2024
- Daniel Lasure – Universitatea Cluj – 2024–2025
- Marcos Lavín – FC Voluntari – 2020–2021
- Fernando Llorente – ACS Poli Timișoara – 2015–2017
- Cristian López – CFR Cluj – 2015–2017
- Daniel López – Viitorul Constanța – 2016–2018
- Iago López – CS Universitatea Craiova – 2024–2025
- Isma López – Dinamo București – 2020–2021
- Pablo de Lucas – Petrolul Ploiești, Viitorul Constanța, FC Voluntari, Argeș Pitești – 2013–2016, 2019–2021
- Antonio Luna – Dinamo București – 2024–2025
- Ángel Martínez – Viitorul Constanța – 2020–2021
- David Mayoral – FC Hermannstadt – 2020–2021
- Tomás Mejías – Dinamo București – 2020–2021
- Rubén Miño – Politehnica Iași – 2018–2019
- Francisco Molinero – Dinamo București – 2009–2010
- Aitor Monroy – Ceahlăul Piatra Neamț, CFR Cluj, Dinamo București, Dunărea Călărași – 2011–2015, 2017–2019
- Antonio Moreno – Ceahlăul Piatra Neamț – 2012–2013
- Miguel Muñoz – FC Botoșani – 2025–
- Vadik Murria – Oțelul Galați – 2025–2026
- Borja Navarro – Săgeata Năvodari – 2013–2014
- Eduard Oriol – Rapid București – 2014–2015
- Joan Oriol – Rapid București – 2014–2015
- Armiche Ortega – Pandurii Târgu Jiu – 2016–2017
- César Ortiz – FC Vaslui – 2013–2014
- Martín Pascual – Dinamo București – 2026–
- Cristian Perea – CFR Cluj – 2026–
- Israel Puerto – Gloria Buzău – 2024–2025
- Rafinha – Petrolul Ploiești – 2025–2026
- Juan Carlos Real – CFR Cluj – 2015–2017
- David Rivas – FC Vaslui – 2010–2011
- Alex Rodriguez – Sepsi Sfântu Gheorghe – 2017–2018
- Julio Rodríguez – FC Voluntari – 2019–2020
- René Román – Dinamo București – 2020–2021
- José Romera – Dinamo București – 2016–2018
- Óscar Rubio – Dinamo București – 2010–2011
- Damià Sabater – Metaloglobus București – 2025–2026
- David Sánchez – Politehnica Timișoara, Gloria Buzău – 2008–2009
- Rufino Segovia – ACS Poli Timișoara – 2015–2016
- Grego Sierra – CS Universitatea Craiova – 2024–2025
- Rober Sierra – Argeș Pitești – 2025–
- Alberto Soro – Dinamo București – 2024–
- Abel Suárez – ACS Poli Timișoara – 2015–2016
- Manu Torres – ACS Poli Timișoara – 2015–2016
- Borja Valle – Dinamo București, Rapid București – 2020–2021, 2023–2024
- Fernando Velasco – Petrolul Ploiești – 2015–2016
- Javier Velayos – FC Brașov, CFR Cluj, ASA Târgu Mureș – 2011–2017
- Urko Vera – CFR Cluj, Astra Giurgiu – 2017–2019

== Sudan ==
- Yasin Hamed – ASA Târgu Mureș, Pandurii Târgu Jiu, Sepsi Sfântu Gheorghe – 2016–2020

== Suriname ==
- Nicandro Breeveld – Gaz Metan Mediaș, Pandurii Târgu Jiu, Steaua București, Politehnica Iași – 2011–2016, 2019–2021
- Danzell Gravenberch – Universitatea Cluj – 2014–2015

== Sweden ==
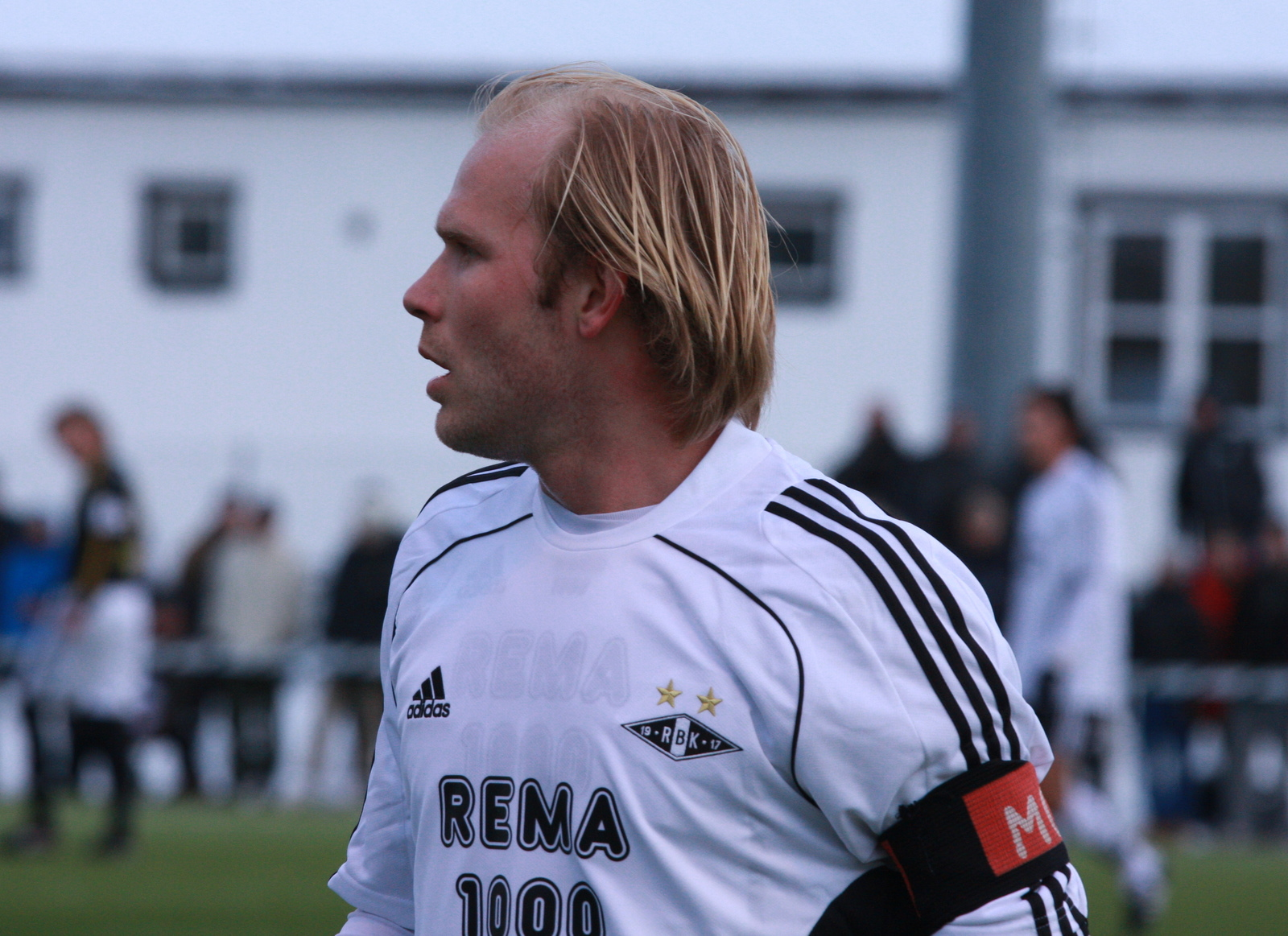
Mikael Dorsin won a Liga I title with CFR Cluj.

- Alibek Aliev – CFR Cluj, Universitatea Cluj – 2025–
- Admir Bajrovic – Sepsi Sfântu Gheorghe – 2020–2021
- Valmir Berisha – Chindia Târgoviște – 2019–2021
- Mikael Dorsin – CFR Cluj – 2007–2008
- Kevin Kabran – Politehnica Iași – 2023–2024
- Oscar Linnér – Petrolul Ploiești – 2024–2025
- Wilhelm Loeper – Csíkszereda – 2025–2026
- Darko Lukanović – Voința Sibiu, Ceahlăul Piatra Neamț – 2011–2013
- Niklas Sandberg – CFR Cluj – 2007–2008
- Moonga Simba – FC Hermannstadt – 2025–2026

== Switzerland ==
- Orhan Ademi – UTA Arad – 2022–2023
- Martin Angha – Oțelul Galați – 2024–2025
- Óscar Correia – Petrolul Ploiești – 2025–2026
- Matteo Fedele – CS Universitatea Craiova – 2018–2019, 2020–2022
- Florian Kamberi – Politehnica Iași – 2024–2025
- Goran Karanović – Sepsi Sfântu Gheorghe, FC Hermannstadt – 2019–2021
- Léo Lacroix – FC U Craiova – 2023–2024
- Noah Loosli – Universitatea Cluj – 2026–
- Cephas Malele – Argeș Pitești, CFR Cluj – 2020–2021, 2022–2023
- Breston Malula – Petrolul Ploiești – 2026–
- Ivan Martić – CS Universitatea Craiova, Universitatea Cluj – 2017–2020, 2022–2023
- Miodrag Mitrović – CS Universitatea Craiova – 2017–2018
- Dimitri Oberlin – Sepsi Sfântu Gheorghe – 2024–2025, 2026–
- Janko Pacar – Petrolul Ploiești – 2015–2016
- Andrea Padula – FC U Craiova – 2023–2024
- Simone Rapp – Sepsi Sfântu Gheorghe – 2020–2021
- Gëzim Shalaj – Pandurii Târgu Jiu, Dinamo București – 2014–2016
- Benjamin Siegrist – Rapid București – 2024–
- Henry Siqueira-Barras – Argeș Pitești, Gloria Bistrița – 2006–2007
- Filip Stojilković – Rapid București – 2026–
- Danijel Subotić – FC Universitatea Craiova, ASA Târgu Mureș, Dinamo București – 2010–2012, 2018–2019
- Marc Tsoungui – Unirea Slobozia – 2025–2026
- Jasper van der Werff – Universitatea Cluj – 2024–2026
- Sébastien Wüthrich – Astra Giurgiu – 2020–2021

== Syria ==
- Mahmoud Al-Mawas – FC Botoșani – 2020–2021
- Aias Aosman – FC Hermannstadt – 2020–2021
- Alan Aussi – CFR Cluj – 2023–2024

== Tajikistan ==
- Iskandar Dzhalilov – CS Turnu Severin – 2012–2013

== Togo ==
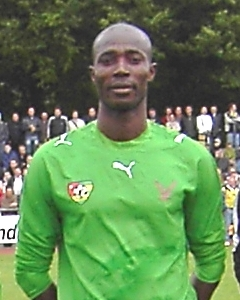
Daré Nibombé was Liga I runner-up with Politehnica Timișoara.

- Camaldine Abraw – ACS Poli Timișoara – 2017–2018
- Charles Acolatse – SC Juventus București – 2017–2018
- Serge Akakpo – FC Vaslui – 2008–2010
- Samuel Asamoah – FC U Craiova – 2021–2024
- Zanzan Atte-Oudeyi – CS Otopeni – 2008–2009
- Kennedy Boateng – Dinamo București – 2024–2026
- Josué Homawoo – Dinamo București – 2023–2025
- Abbe Ibrahim – Ceahlăul Piatra Neamț – 2009–2010
- Daré Nibombé – CS Otopeni, Politehnica Timișoara – 2008–2010
- Serge Nyuiadzi – Astra Giurgiu – 2017–2018

== Tunisia ==
- Selim Ben Djemia – Petrolul Ploiești, Astra Giurgiu, Dunărea Călărași – 2011–2013, 2018–2019
- Syam Ben Youssef – Astra Giurgiu, CFR Cluj – 2012–2015, 2020–2021
- Zied Bhairi – Gloria Bistrița – 2008–2009
- Haykel Guemamdia – Ceahlăul Piatra Neamț – 2007–2008
- Aïssa Laïdouni – FC Voluntari – 2018–2020
- Sofien Moussa – Petrolul Ploiești, Concordia Chiajna, FC Botoșani, Academica Clinceni – 2015–2016, 2018–2020
- Hamza Younés – Petrolul Ploiești – 2011–2014

== Turkey ==
- Atay Akgün – Petrolul Ploiești – 2026–
- Ali Demirel – Petrolul Ploiești – 2024–2025
- Ayhan Güçlü – FC Brașov – 2012–2013
- Gökhan Kardeş – SC Juventus București – 2017–2018
- Hakan Sedat – Astra Ploiești – 2002–2003
- Bülent Seyrun – Astra Ploiești – 2002–2003
- Ersin Veli – Ceahlăul Piatra Neamț – 2009–2010

== Uganda ==
- Baba Alhassan – FC Hermannstadt, FCSB – 2020–2021, 2022–2026
- Elio Capradossi – Universitatea Cluj – 2025–2026
- Luwagga Kizito – Politehnica Iași – 2017–2019

== Ukraine ==
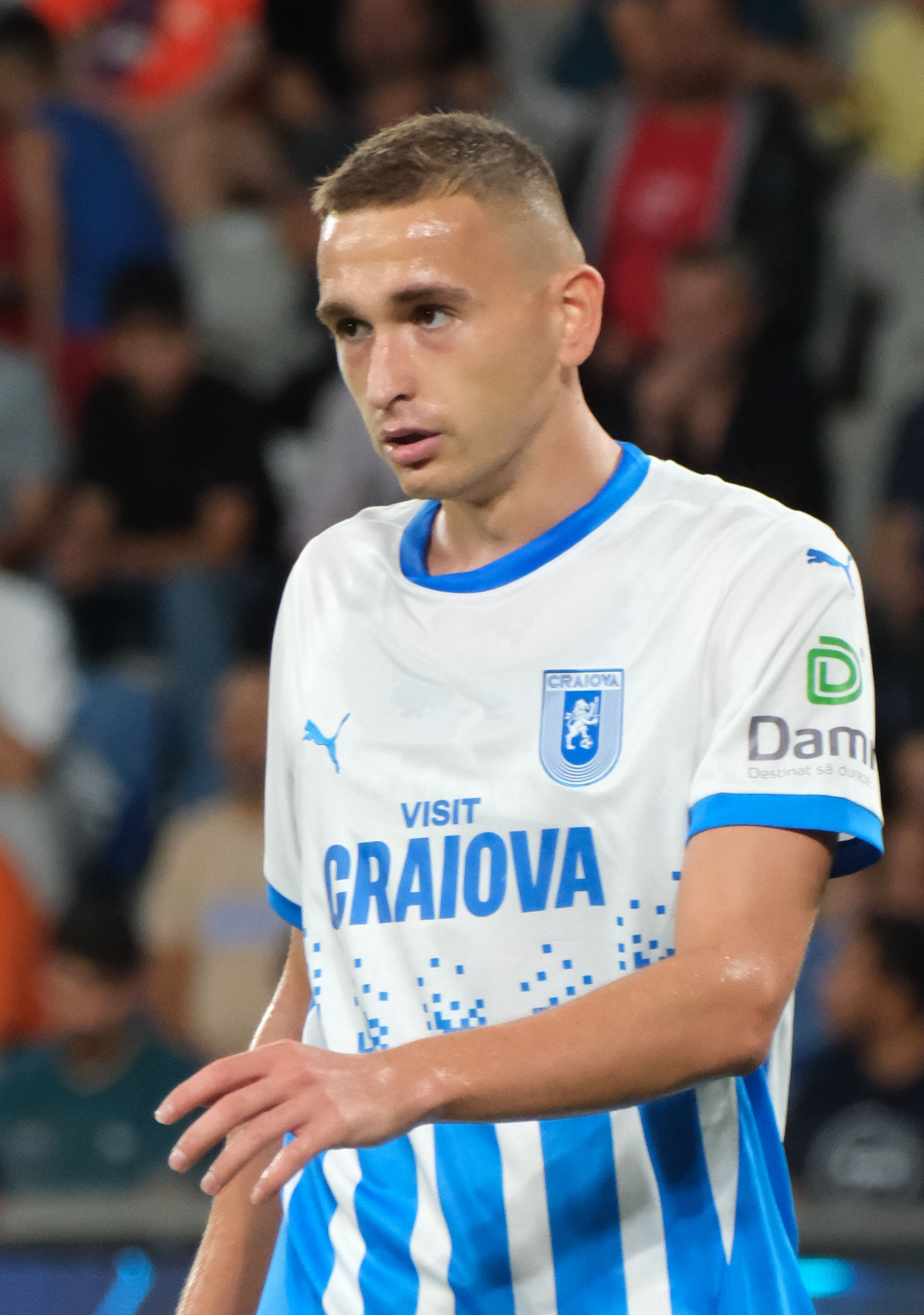
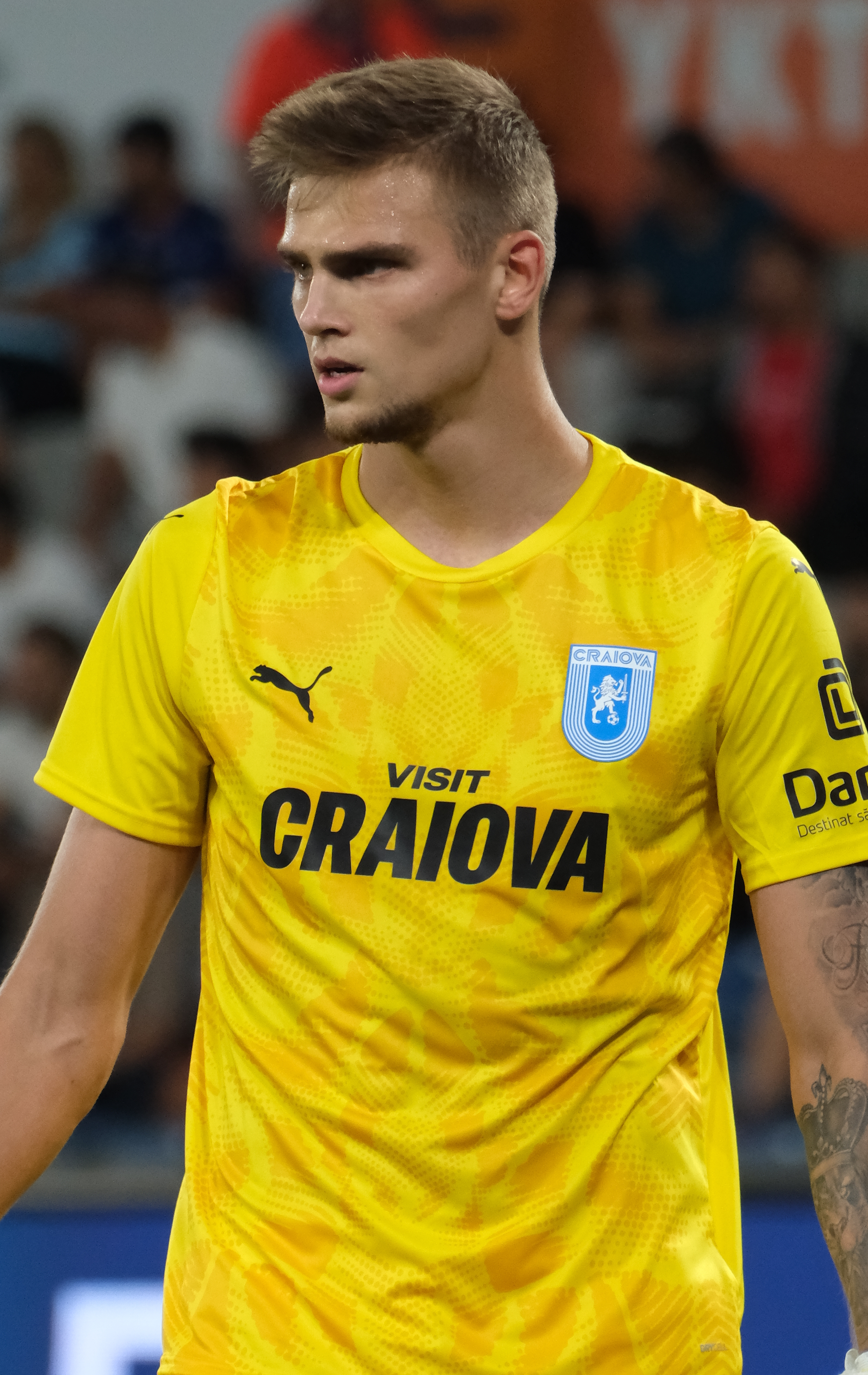
Oleksandr Romanchuk (left) and Pavlo Isenko (right) helped CS Universitatea Craiova win the 2025–26 Liga I title.
- Vitaliy Balytskyi – CFR Cluj – 2004–2005
- Andriy Fedorenko – Ceahlăul Piatra Neamț – 2006–2007
- Pavlo Isenko – CS Universitatea Craiova – 2025–
- Daniel Kivinda – Farul Constanța – 2024–2025
- Yevhen Konoplyanka – CFR Cluj – 2023–2024
- Mykola Kovtalyuk – FC Botoșani – 2025–
- Danylo Kucher – UTA Arad – 2022–2024
- Ihor Lytovka – FC Voluntari – 2015–2016
- Artem Milevskyi – Concordia Chiajna – 2015–2016
- Júnior Moraes – Gloria Bistrița – 2009–2011
- Dmytro Pospyelov – Unirea Slobozia, UTA Arad – 2024–
- Oleksandr Romanchuk – CS Universitatea Craiova – 2025–
- Oleksandr Safronov – Unirea Slobozia – 2025–2026
- Artem Semenenko – CSMS Iași – 2012–2013
- Denis Sytnik – Petrolul Ploiești – 2011–2012
- Denys Yanakov – Unirea Slobozia – 2025–2026
- Dmytro Yusov – Unirea Slobozia – 2024–2025
- Nikolai Zbarach – Petrolul Ploiești – 2003–2004

== United States ==
- Nana Akosah-Bempah – Petrolul Ploiești – 2024–2025
- Steve Reese – Politehnica Timișoara – 2002–2003

== Uruguay ==
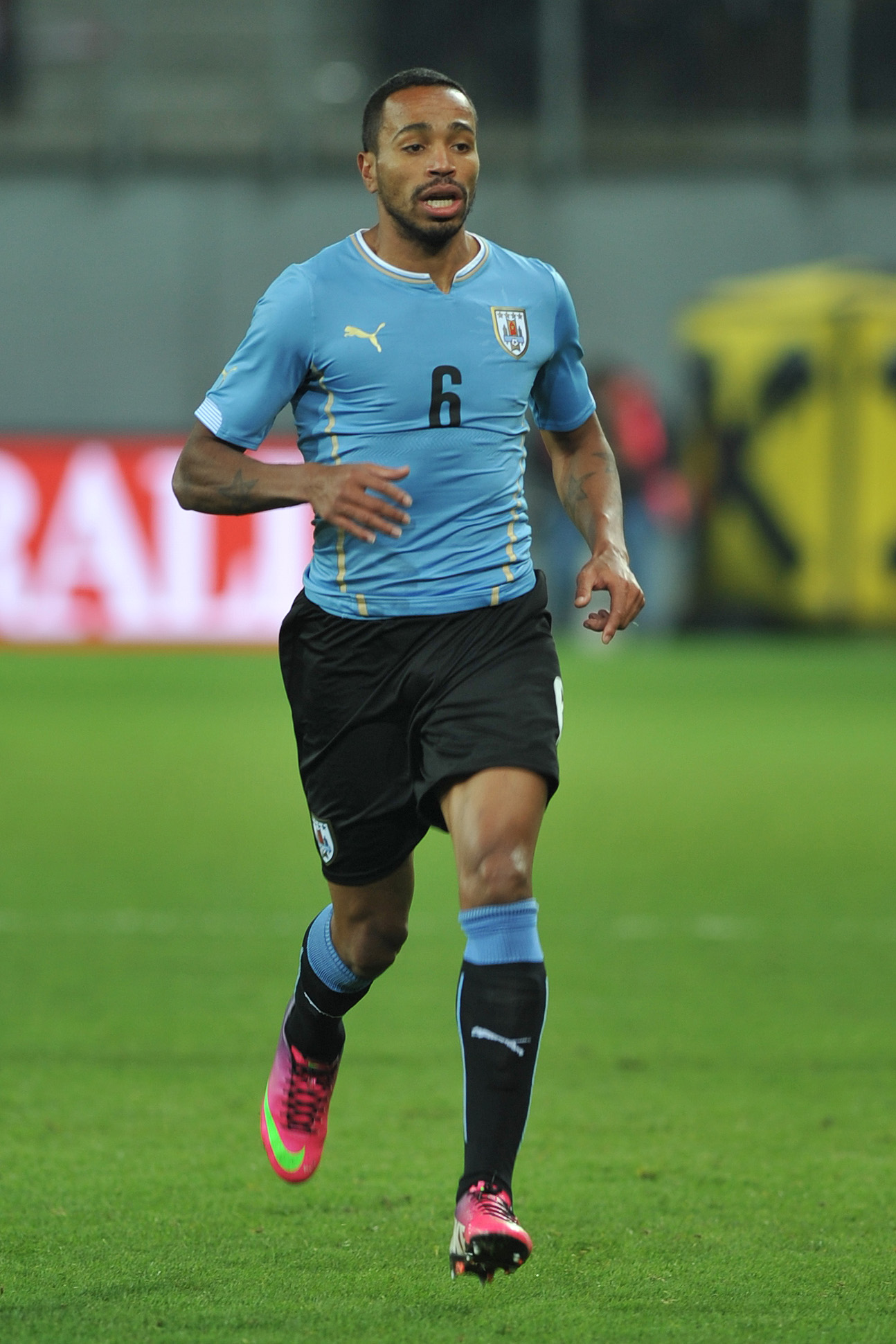
World Cup semi-finalist and Copa América winner Álvaro Pereira spent his first season in Europe at CFR Cluj.

- Giorginho Aguirre – Corona Brașov – 2013–2014
- Matías Aguirregaray – CFR Cluj – 2012–2013
- Juan Albín – Petrolul Ploiești, Dinamo București – 2013–2015, 2017–2018
- Maximiliano Arias – Astra Ploiești – 2009–2010
- Francisco Barrios – CFR Cluj – 2026–
- Dionisio Cabrera – FC Vaslui – 2005–2006
- Pablo Ceppelini – Universitatea Cluj – 2014–2015
- Diego Ciz – Rapid București – 2009–2010
- Silvio Dorrego – FC Botoșani – 2013–2014
- Darío Flores – CFR Cluj – 2008–2010
- Sebastián Gallegos – Petrolul Ploiești – 2014–2015
- Mauro Goicoechea – Oțelul Galați – 2013–2014
- Ariel López – Oțelul Galați, UTA Arad, Unirea Slobozia – 2023–2025
- Walter López – FC Universitatea Craiova – 2010–2011
- Facundo Mallo – Dinamo București – 2018–2019
- Marcelo Méndez – Astra Ploiești – 2009–2010
- Rodrigo Pastorini – Petrolul Ploiești – 2014–2015
- Álvaro Pereira – CFR Cluj – 2008–2009
- Nicolás Rodríguez – Corona Brașov – 2013–2014
- Diego Silva – Astra Ploiești – 2009–2010
- Cristian Sosa – FCM Târgu Mureș – 2010–2011
- Agustín Viana – CFR Cluj – 2008–2009

== Venezuela ==
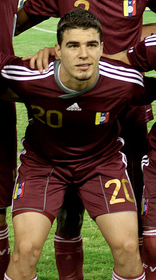
Alexander González played briefly in Liga I for Dinamo București.

- Rafael Acosta – Politehnica Iași – 2020–2021
- Gualberto Campos – Dinamo București – 2008–2009
- Alexander González – Dinamo București – 2020–2021
- Ricardo Páez – Politehnica Timișoara – 2005–2006
- Mario Rondón – Gaz Metan Mediaș, CFR Cluj, Sepsi Sfântu Gheorghe – 2017–2021, 2022–2024
- Jorge Luis Ruiz – ACS Poli Timișoara – 2013–2014
- Franco Signorelli – FC Voluntari – 2018–2020

== Zambia ==
- Fwayo Tembo – Astra Giurgiu – 2012–2016

== Zimbabwe ==
- Mike Temwanjera – FC Vaslui – 2006–2014

== Notes ==
1. Born in Albania
2. Born in Angola
3. Born in Australia
4. Born in Austria
5. Born in Austria (then part of Austria-Hungary)
6. Born in Belarus (then part of the Soviet Union)
7. Born in Belgium
8. Born in Bosnia and Herzegovina
9. Born in Bosnia and Herzegovina (then part of SFR Yugoslavia)
10. Born in Brazil
11. Born in Cameroon
12. Born in Canada
13. Born in Cape Verde
14. Born in Croatia
15. Born in Croatia (then part of SFR Yugoslavia)
16. Born in the Democratic Republic of Congo
17. Born in the Democratic Republic of Congo (then Zaïre)
18. Born in England
19. Born in France
20. Born in Germany
21. Born in Ghana
22. Born in Greece
23. Born in Guinea-Bissau
24. Born in Italy
25. Born in Ivory Coast
26. Born in Kosovo (then part of SFR Yugoslavia)
27. Born in Kosovo (then part of FR Yugoslavia)
28. Born in Luxembourg
29. Born in Netherlands
30. Born in Nigeria
31. Born in Norway
32. Born in Paraguay
33. Born in Poland
34. Born in Portugal
35. Born in the Republic of Macedonia
36. Born in the Réunion
37. Born in Romania
38. Born in Romania (then part of Austria-Hungary)
39. Born in Russia
40. Born in Serbia (then part of SFR Yugoslavia)
41. Born in Serbia (then part of FR Yugoslavia)
42. Born in Slovakia (then part of First Czechoslovak Republic)
43. Born in South Africa
44. Born in Spain
45. Born in Sweden
46. Born in Switzerland
47. Born in Turkey
48. Born in the Uganda
49. Born in the Ukraine
50. Born in the USA
51. Born in West Germany (now part of Germany)
52. Capped for the Albania national under-17 football team
53. Capped for the Albania national under-19 football team
54. Capped for the Albania national under-21 football team
55. Capped for the Belarus national under-16 football team
56. Capped for the Belgium national under-15 football team
57. Capped for the Belgium national under-16 football team
58. Capped for the Belgium national under-17 football team
59. Capped for the Belgium national under-18 football team
60. Capped for the Belgium national under-20 football team
61. Capped for the Belgium national under-21 football team
62. Capped for the Belgium national under-23 football team
63. Capped for the Benin national football B team
64. Capped for the Bosnia and Herzegovina national under-19 football team
65. Capped for the Canada national under-17 football team
66. Capped for the Canada national under-20 football team
67. Capped for the Croatia national under-16 football team
68. Capped for the Croatia national under-17 football team
69. Capped for the Croatia national under-18 football team
70. Capped for the Croatia national under-19 football team
71. Capped for the Croatia national under-20 football team
72. Capped for the Croatia national under-21 football team
73. Capped for the Curaçao national football team
74. Capped for the England national under-17 football team
75. Capped for the England national under-20 football team
76. Capped for the France national under-16 football team
77. Capped for the France national under-17 football team
78. Capped for the France national under-18 football team
79. Capped for the France national under-19 football team
80. Capped for the France national under-20 football team
81. Capped for the France national under-21 football team
82. Capped for the Germany national under-18 football team
83. Capped for the Germany national under-19 football team
84. Capped for the Iraqi Kurdistan national football team
85. Capped for the Italy national under-15 football team
86. Capped for the Italy national under-16 football team
87. Capped for the Italy national under-17 football team
88. Capped for the Italy national under-18 football team
89. Capped for the Italy national under-19 football team
90. Capped for the Italy national under-20 football team
91. Capped for the Italy national under-21 football team
92. Capped for the Ivory Coast national under-17 football team
93. Capped for the Ivory Coast national under-19 football team
94. Capped for the Ivory Coast national under-20 football team
95. Capped for the Martinique national football team
96. Capped for the Macedonia national under-19 football team
97. Capped for the Morocco national under-17 football team
98. Capped for the Netherlands national under-17 football team
99. Capped for the Netherlands national under-18 football team
100. Capped for the Netherlands national under-19 football team
101. Capped for the Netherlands national under-20 football team
102. Capped for the Netherlands national under-21 football team
103. Capped for the Norway national under-15 football team
104. Capped for the Norway national under-16 football team
105. Capped for the Norway national under-17 football team
106. Capped for the Norway national under-18 football team
107. Capped for the Norway national under-19 football team
108. Capped for the Paraguay national football team
109. Capped for the Portugal national under-15 football team
110. Capped for the Portugal national under-16 football team
111. Capped for the Portugal national under-17 football team
112. Capped for the Portugal national under-18 football team
113. Capped for the Portugal national under-19 football team
114. Capped for the Portugal national under-20 football team
115. Capped for the Portugal national under-21 football team
116. Capped for the Portugal Olympic football team
117. Capped for the Portugal national football B team
118. Capped for the Portugal national football team
119. Capped for the Romania national under-15 football team
120. Capped for the Romania national under-16 football team
121. Capped for the Romania national under-17 football team
122. Capped for the Romania national under-18 football team
123. Capped for the Romania national under-19 football team
124. Capped for the Romania national under-20 football team
125. Capped for the Romania national under-23 football team
126. Capped for the Romania national football team
127. Capped for the Russia national under-17 football team
128. Capped for the Russia national under-18 football team
129. Capped for the Russia national under-19 football team
130. Capped for the Serbia national under-17 football team
131. Capped for the Serbia national under-19 football team
132. Capped for the Switzerland national under-15 football team
133. Capped for the Switzerland national under-16 football team
134. Capped for the Switzerland national under-17 football team
135. Capped for the Switzerland national under-18 football team
136. Capped for the Switzerland national under-19 football team
137. Capped for the Switzerland national under-20 football team
138. Capped for the Switzerland national under-21 football team
139. Capped for the Sweden men's national under-16 football team
140. Capped for the Sweden men's national under-19 football team
141. Capped for the Syria national football team
142. Capped for the Ukraine national under-16 football team
143. Capped for the Ukraine national under-17 football team
144. Capped for the Ukraine national under-18 football team
145. Capped for the Ukraine national under-19 football team
146. Capped for the Yugoslavia national football team
