= 2021–22 FC Dinamo București season =

Dinamo București
2021–22 season
- Head Coach: Dario Bonetti (until 14 September); Sorin Colceag (15 September-29 September); Mircea Rednic (29 September-21 December); Flavius Stoican (21 December-9 March); Dušan Uhrin Jr. (from 9 March)
- Stadium: Dinamo
- Liga I: 14th
- Cupa României: Round of 16
- Top goalscorer: League: Sorescu (8); All: Sorescu (8)
- Highest home attendance: 11,523 (vs. U.Cluj)
- Lowest home attendance: 500 (vs. Sepsi)
- Average home league attendance: 1,829

The 2021–22 season was Dinamo București's 73rd year in their history, all of them played in the top-flight of Romanian football. Along with the league, the club also competed in the Cupa României. The season covered the period from 15 June 2021 to 1 June 2022.

On 29 May 2022, the club's relegation to the second division was confirmed after 74 years in the top tier.

== Pre-season friendlies ==
Dinamo announced they would play friendly matches against Galatasaray and Ankara Keçiörengücü as part of the pre-season preparations.

23 June 2021 Friendly	Ankara Keçiörengücü (Turkey)	1–4	Dinamo	Bolu
	Goal		14' own goal 28' (pen.) Sorescu; 35' Mihaiu; 53' Măgureanu

27 June 2021 Friendly	Galatasaray (Turkey)	2–1	Dinamo	Florya
	Kara 36', 62'		49' Nemec

== Competitions ==
=== Liga I ===
==== Regular season ====
===== League table =====
Pos	Team	Pld	W	D	L	GF	GA	GD	Pts	Qualification
12	FC U Craiova 1948	30	8	9	13	31	35	−4	33	Qualification for the Play-out round
13	Mioveni	30	6	11	13	19	36	−17	29	Qualification for the Play-out round
14	Dinamo București	30	4	5	21	24	66	−42	17	Qualification for the Play-out round
15	Academica Clinceni	30	3	5	22	21	64	−43	14	Qualification for the Play-out round
16	Gaz Metan Mediaș (Note: Gaz Metan Mediaș were deducted 22 points due to financial reasons.)	30	6	6	18	21	46	−25	2	Qualification for the Play-out round

Source: LPF (in Romanian) Soccerway
Rules for classification: 1) Points; 2) Head-to-head points; 3) Head-to-head goal difference; 4) Head-to-head goals scored; 5) Goal difference; 6) Goals scored; 7) Play-off.

===== Results summary =====
Overall								Home						Away					
Pld	W	D	L	GF	GA	GD	Pts	W	D	L	GF	GA	GD	W	D	L	GF	GA	GD
30	4	5	21	24	66	−42	17	4	3	8	17	28	−11	0	2	13	7	38	−31

Last updated: 6 March.

===== Results by matchday =====
Matchday	1	2	3	4	5	6	7	8	9	10	11	12	13	14	15	16	17	18	19	20	21	22	23	24	25	26	27	28	29	30
Ground	H	A	H	A	H	A	H	A	H	A	H	A	H	A	H	A	H	A	H	A	H	A	H	A	H	A	H	A	H	A
Result	W	L	W	L	L	L	L	L	L	L	D	L	D	L	L	L	D	L	W	L	L	L	L	L	L	D	W	D	L	L
Position	2	8	4	6	8	11	14	14	15	15	15	15	15	15	15	15	15	15	15	15	15	15	15	15	15	15	15	14	14	14

Updated to match(es) played on 6 March. Source: Statto.com
A = Away; H = Home; W = Win; D = Draw; L = Loss

===== Matches =====
====== July ======
19 July 2021 1	Dinamo București	3–2	Voluntari	Bucharest
20:30 EEST (UTC+3)	Sorescu 44', 58', 72'; Sorescu (yellow card) 45'; Eșanu (yellow card) 89'	Report	Fülöp 14'; Lopes (yellow card) 45+1'; Rață 66'; Fülöp (yellow card) 68'; Tamaș (yellow card) 89'; Ricardinho (yellow card) 90+7'	Stadium: Stadionul Dinamo; Attendance: 3,000; Referee: Iulian Dima (Bucharest)

26 July 2021 2	FC U Craiova 1948	1–0	Dinamo București	Craiova
21:30 EEST (UTC+3)	Vieira 65'; Huyghebaert (yellow card) 69'; Vieira (yellow card) 89'	Report	Crețu (yellow card) 42'; Radu (yellow card) 72'; Filip (yellow card) 76'; Eșanu (yellow card) 90'	Stadium: Stadionul Ion Oblemenco; Attendance: 11,000; Referee: Iulian Călin (Ștefănești, Argeș)

====== August ======
2 August 2021 3	Dinamo București	3–1	Academica Clinceni	Bucharest
21:30 EEST (UTC+3)	Sorescu 45+4', 90+4'; Filip (yellow card) 56'; Mihaiu 71'; Crețu (yellow card) 85'	Report	Cioiu 37'; Cascini (yellow card) 65'; Gardoș (yellow card) 89'	Stadium: Stadionul Dinamo; Attendance: 2,400; Referee: Sebastian Colțescu (Craiova)

8 August 2021 4	Chindia Târgoviște	1–0	Dinamo București	Buzău
19:00 EEST (UTC+3)	Florea 25'; Florea (yellow card) 45'; Celea (yellow card) 68'; Popadiuc (yellow card) 87'; Dulca (yellow card) 89'	Report	Crețu (yellow card) 57'; Sorescu (yellow card) 70'; Giafer (yellow card) 73'	Stadium: Stadionul Municipal; Attendance: 4,560; Referee: Lucian Rușandu (Sfântu Gheorghe)

16 August 2021 5	Dinamo București	0–1	Mioveni	Bucharest
21:30 EEST (UTC+3)	Grigore (yellow card) 22'; Moldoveanu (yellow card) 25'; Răuță (yellow card) 35'; Filip (yellow card) 86'	Report	Panait (yellow card) 40'; Rusu 50'; Buziuc (yellow card) 75'; Ducan (yellow card) 90+3'	Stadium: Stadionul Dinamo; Attendance: 2,840; Referee: Istvan Kovacs (Carei)

20 August 2021 6	Farul Constanța	3–0	Dinamo București	Ovidiu
21:30 EEST (UTC+3)	Betancor 12', 53'; De Nooijer (yellow card) 45+1'; Ganea 57'	Report	Filip (yellow card) 65'; Grigore (yellow card) 82'	Stadium: Stadionul Viitorul; Attendance: 3,400; Referee: George Cătălin Găman (Craiova)

28 August 2021 7	Dinamo București	0–2	Argeș	Bucharest
18:00 EEST (UTC+3)	Răuță (yellow card) 6'; Radu (yellow card) 30'; Sorescu (yellow card) 74'; Moldoveanu (yellow card) 90+3'	Report	Tănase 10', 62'; Tofan (yellow card) 23'; Ișfan (yellow card) 68'; Mușat (yellow card) 87'	Stadium: Stadionul Dinamo; Attendance: 1,400; Referee: Florin Andrei (Târgu Mureș)

====== September ======
12 September 2021 8	FCSB	6–0	Dinamo București	Bucharest
21:00 EEST (UTC+3)	Crețu (yellow card) 14'; Keserü 26'; Popescu 43'; Vinícius 45+2'; Cordea 45+7' (pen.); Gheorghe 54'; Keserü (yellow card) 63'; Miron 67'; Miron (yellow card) 80'	Report	Itu (yellow card) 25'; Filip (red card) 37'; Matei (yellow card) 45+2'; Sorescu (yellow card) 53'; Răuță (yellow card) 61'	Stadium: Arena Națională; Attendance: 36,147; Referee: Istvan Kovacs (Carei)

19 September 2021 9	Dinamo București	1–2	Botoșani	Bucharest
19:00 EEST (UTC+3)	Răuță (yellow card) 45'; Torje 85'; Țîră (yellow card) 90+4'	Report	Ongenda 13'; Kage 18' (pen.); Edjouma (yellow card) 46'; Șeroni (yellow card) 32'; Florescu (yellow card) 66'	Stadium: Stadionul Dinamo; Attendance: 1,550; Referee: Ovidiu Hațegan (Arad)

27 September 2021 10	CS Universitatea Craiova	5–0	Dinamo București	Craiova
21:00 EEST (UTC+3)	Houri 18' (pen.); Ivan 52'; Cîmpanu 58'; Constantin (yellow card) 59'; Căpățînă 62'; Marković 90+1'	Report	Giafer (yellow card) 6' (yellow-red card) 16'; Ivanovski (yellow card) 23'; Sorescu (yellow card) 39'	Stadium: Stadionul Ion Oblemenco; Attendance: 7,232; Referee: Cătălin Popa (Pitești)

====== October ======
2 October 2021 11	Dinamo București	2–2	UTA	Bucharest
16:30 EEST (UTC+3)	Torje 7'; Sorescu 54' (pen.); Filip (yellow card) 70'; Ivanovski (yellow card) 74'; Moldoveanu (yellow card) 75'	Report	Batha (red card) 45+2'; Iacob (yellow card) 45+2'; Miculescu 63', 90+5'	Stadium: Stadionul Dinamo; Attendance: 1,200; Referee: Marian Barbu (Făgăraș)

15 October 2021 12	Gaz Metan Mediaș	2–1	Dinamo București	Mediaș
20:30 EEST (UTC+3)	Gabriel Moura (yellow card) 28'; Deaconu 36', 38'; Trif (yellow card) 86'; Chamed (yellow card) 89'	Report	Filip (yellow card) 54'; Crețu (yellow card) 70'; Ivanovski 84'; Dudea (red card) 85' (on the bench); Moldoveanu (yellow card) 86'	Stadium: Stadionul Gaz Metan; Attendance: 1,000; Referee: Adrian Cojocaru (Galați)

23 October 2021 13	Dinamo București	1–1	Rapid București	Bucharest
20:30 EEST (UTC+3)	Torje 55'; Radu (yellow card) 73'; Sorescu (yellow card) 78'; Matei (yellow card) 85'	Report	Grigore (yellow card) 13'; Belu (yellow card) 46'; Carnat 90+1'	Stadium: Stadionul Dinamo; Attendance: 2,151; Referee: Horațiu Feșnic (Cluj-Napoca)

31 October 2021 14	Sepsi Sfântu Gheorghe	4–1	Dinamo București	Sfântu Gheorghe
17:30 EET (UTC+2)	Ștefănescu 13', 21'; González (yellow card) 33'; Mitrea 72'; Fofana (yellow card) 81'; Fofana 86'	Report	Torje 39'; Torje (yellow card) 90'	Stadium: Stadionul Sepsi; Attendance: 0 Referee: Sebastian Colțescu (Craiova)

====== November ======
7 November 2021 15	Dinamo București	0–3	CFR Cluj	Bucharest
18:30 EET (UTC+2)	Bani (yellow card) 50'; Matei (yellow card) 75'; Espinosa (yellow card) 82'	Report	Omrani 14'; Debeljuh 17'; Boateng (yellow card) 51'; Deac 80'	Stadium: Stadionul Dinamo; Attendance: 0 Referee: Marian Barbu (Făgăraș)

22 November 2021 16	Voluntari	2–1	Dinamo București	Voluntari
20:30 EET (UTC+2)	Rață 19'; Armaș (yellow card) 26'; Droppa (yellow card) 33'; Rață (yellow card) 47'; Gheorghe 65'	Report	Sorescu 5'; Ehmann (yellow card) 90+2'	Stadium: Stadionul Anghel Iordănescu; Attendance: 0 Referee: Iulian Călin (Ștefănești, Argeș)

26 November 2021 17	Dinamo București	0–0	FC U Craiova 1948	Bucharest
20:30 EEST (UTC+2)	Răuță (yellow card) 43'; Nunić (yellow card) 75'; Torje (yellow card) 85'; Matei (yellow card) 90'	Report	Sidibe (yellow card) 30'; Ondaan (yellow card) 43'; Compagno (yellow card) 54'; Raicea (yellow card) 77'; Van Durmen (yellow card) 78'; Gajić (yellow card) 89'	Stadium: Stadionul Dinamo; Attendance: 0 Referee: Adrian Cojocaru (Galați)

====== December ======
3 December 2021 18	Academica Clinceni	1–0	Dinamo București	Giurgiu
21:00 EET (UTC+2)	Omoh (yellow card) 7'; Cascini (yellow card) 22'; Bilali (yellow card) 25'; Patriche 33'; Patriche (yellow card) 58'; William (yellow card) 80'; Chandarov (yellow card) 86'	Report	Ivanovski (yellow card) 58'; Pinto (yellow card) 69'; Torje (yellow card) 90+1'	Stadium: Stadionul Marin Anastasovici; Attendance: 0 Referee: Andrei Chivulete (București)

13 December 2021 19	Dinamo București	1–0	Chindia Târgoviște	Bucharest
20:30 EEST (UTC+2)	Carp 62'; Răuță (yellow card) 70'; Iliev (yellow card) 83'	Report	Celea (yellow card) 54'; Dulca (yellow card) 89'	Stadium: Stadionul Dinamo; Attendance: 900; Referee: Ovidiu Hațegan (Arad)

16 December 2021 20	Mioveni	2–1	Dinamo București	Mioveni
17:30 EET (UTC+2)	Rusu (yellow card) 3'; Sanoh (yellow card) 73'; Panait (yellow card) 85'; Sanoh 90+3' (pen.); Rusu 90+5'	Report	Răuță (yellow card) 17'; Kenourgios (yellow card) 45'; Radu (yellow card) 48'; Sorescu 62'; Sorescu (yellow card) 71'; Iliev (yellow card) 90+1'	Stadium: Stadionul Orășenesc; Attendance: 2,000; Referee: Sorin Costreie (Buftea)

20 December 2021 21	Dinamo București	0–2	Farul Constanța	Bucharest
20:30 EET (UTC+2)	Carp (yellow card) 67'	Report	Betancor 53'; Ganea 56'; Romário Pires (yellow card) 73'	Stadium: Stadionul Dinamo; Attendance: 1,000; Referee: Istvan Kovacs (Carei)

====== January ======
21 January 2022 22	Argeș	2–1	Dinamo București	Pitești
20:00 EET (UTC+2)	João Miguel (yellow card) 38'; Ișfan 51'; Șerban (yellow card) 65'; Șerban 69' (pen.); Greab (yellow card) 90+3'	Report	Tomozei (yellow card) 20'; Pierret (yellow card) 21'; Răuță (yellow card) 45+1'; Patriche (yellow card) 68'; Ivanovski 86'	Stadium: Stadionul Nicolae Dobrin; Attendance: 1,500; Referee: Marcel Bîrsan (București)

30 January 2022 23	Dinamo București	0–3	FCSB	Bucharest
20:00 EET (UTC+2)	Ehmann (yellow card) 16'; Matei (yellow card) 19'; Răuță (yellow card) 29' (yellow-red card) 35'; Rodríguez (yellow card) 54'	Report	Oct.Popescu 2'; Tănase (yellow card) 31'; Stoica 75'; Oaidă 81'	Stadium: Stadionul Dinamo; Attendance: 3,500; Referee: Ovidiu Hațegan (Arad)

====== February ======
7 February 2022 24	Botoșani	4–0	Dinamo București	Botoșani
19:55 EET (UTC+2)	Roman 12'; Jája 27', 65'; Șeroni (yellow card) 59'; Fili 84'	Report	Patriche (yellow card) 18'; Ivanovski (yellow card) 59'; Azankpo (yellow card) 77'	Stadium: Stadionul Municipal; Attendance: 1,500; Referee: George Găman (Craiova)

10 February 2022 25	Dinamo București	1–6	CSU Craiova	Bucharest
19:55 EET (UTC+2)	Grigore (yellow card) 11'; Rodríguez (yellow card) 22'; Čelar (yellow card) 28'; Matei 61' (pen.); Aloé (red card) 69'	Report	Cîmpanu 9'; Ivan 45' (pen.); Marković 46'; Vătăjelu (yellow card) 53'; Bancu 57'; Gustavo Vagenin (yellow card) 59'; Gustavo Vagenin 65'; Papp (yellow card) 83'; Trică 88'	Stadium: Stadionul Dinamo; Attendance: 1,238; Referee: Horațiu Feșnic (Cluj-Napoca)

13 February 2022 26	UTA	0–0	Dinamo București	Arad
17:00 EET (UTC+2)	Shlyakov (yellow card) 55'	Report	Ehmann (yellow card) 36' (yellow-red card) 41'; Răuță (yellow card) 75' (yellow-red card) 78'; Cristiano (yellow card) 90'	Stadium: Stadionul Francisc von Neuman; Attendance: 3,700; Referee: Cătălin Popa (Pitești)

18 February 2022 27	Dinamo București	4–0	Gaz Metan Mediaș	Bucharest
19:55 EET (UTC+2)	Ivanovski 20'; Pierret (yellow card) 26'; Bordușanu 38'; Ivanov (yellow card) 40'; Radu (yellow card) 49'; Buleică (yellow card) 64'; Torje 74' (pen.), 77'	Report	Gașpar (yellow card) 15'	Stadium: Stadionul Dinamo; Attendance: 1,300; Referee: Sebastian Colţescu (Craiova)

26 February 2022 28	Rapid București	1–1	Dinamo București	Bucharest
20:30 EET (UTC+2)	Vojtuš 23'; Júnior Morais (yellow card) 32'; Dandea (yellow card) 58'; Grigore (yellow card) 58'	Report	Matei 20'; Pierret (yellow card) 45+1'; Cristiano (yellow card) 90+5'	Stadium: Arena Națională; Attendance: 13,500; Referee: Istvan Kovacs (Carei)

====== March ======
1 March 2022 29	Dinamo București	1–3	Sepsi Sfântu Gheorghe	Bucharest
17:30 EET (UTC+2)	Patriche (yellow card) 10'; Patriche 45+3'; Rodríguez (yellow card) 70'; Torje (yellow card) 79'	Report	Ștefănescu 11' (pen.); Niňaj (yellow card) 33'; Bărbuț (yellow card) 43'; Păun (yellow card) 45+1'; Dumitrescu (yellow card) 45+2'; Niňaj 53'; Ashkovski 90+4'	Stadium: Stadionul Dinamo; Attendance: 500; Referee: Viorel Flueran (Craiova)

6 March 2022 30	CFR Cluj	4–1	Dinamo București	Cluj-Napoca
17:30 EET (UTC+2)	Deac 39'; Debeljuh 51', 58' (76); Graovac (yellow card) 69'; Manea (yellow card) 79'	Report	Aloé 4'; Filip (yellow card) 39' (yellow-red card) 45+2'	Stadium: Stadionul Dr. Constantin Rădulescu; Attendance: 4,500; Referee: Iulian Călin (Ștefănești, Argeș)

==== Play-out ====
===== Table =====
Pos	Team	Pld	W	D	L	GF	GA	GD	Pts	Qualification or relegation
7	Sepsi OSK (Q)	9	7	1	1	21	4	+17	42	Qualification to Europa Conference League second qualifying round (Note: Sepsi OSK qualified for the 2022–23 UEFA Europa Conference League by winning the 2021–22 Cupa României.)
8	Botoșani	9	6	0	3	18	9	+9	41	Qualification to European competition play-offs
9	Rapid București	9	6	1	2	22	7	+15	39	
10	FC U Craiova 1948	9	5	2	2	14	11	+3	34	
11	UTA Arad	9	4	1	4	10	6	+4	33	
12	Mioveni	9	5	1	3	12	10	+2	31	
13	Chindia Târgoviște (O)	9	2	2	5	8	8	0	26	Qualification for the relegation play-offs
14	Dinamo București (R)	9	4	2	3	14	11	+3	23	Qualification for the relegation play-offs
15	Academica Clinceni (Note: Academica were deducted 44 points due to financial reasons. They later dissolved and restarted under a new name called HD Clinceni 2022.) (D, R)	9	0	0	9	4	32	−28	−43	Clubs withdrew from the league
16	Gaz Metan Mediaș (Note: Gaz Metan Mediaș were deducted 50 points due to financial reasons. They later withdrew and completed under the name of ACS Mediaș 2022.) (D, R)	9	1	0	8	6	31	−25	−46	Clubs withdrew from the league

Source: Soccerway, FRF (in Romanian), LPF (in Romanian)
Rules for classification: 1) Points; 2) Points without rounding; 3) Points in the regular season; 4) Goal difference; 5) Goals scored; 6) Play-off (only if needed to decide teams for relegation). (Note: only criteria 4 and 5 are applied to establish the classification during the competition.)
(D) Disqualified; (O) Play-off winners; (Q) Qualified for the phase indicated; (R) Relegated

===== Results summary =====
Overall								Home						Away					
Pld	W	D	L	GF	GA	GD	Pts	W	D	L	GF	GA	GD	W	D	L	GF	GA	GD
9	4	2	3	14	11	+3	14	1	2	1	7	4	+3	3	0	2	7	7	0

Last updated: 14 May 2022.
Source: Liga I

===== Results by matchday =====
Round	1	2	3	4	5	6	7	8	9
Ground	A	H	A	H	A	A	H	A	H
Result	L	D	W	L	L	W	W	W	D
Position	14	14	14	14	14	14	14	14	14

Updated to match(es) played on 14 May 2022. Source: Liga I
A = Away; H = Home; W = Win; D = Draw; L = Loss

===== Matches =====
====== March ======
13 March 2022 1	Rapid București	3–1	Dinamo București	Mioveni
20:30 EET (UTC+2)	Ioniță 3'; Käit 8'; Bălan 30'	Report	Morar 11'; Aloé (yellow card) 29'; Carp (yellow card) 32'; Ehmann (yellow card) 46'	Stadium: Stadionul Orășenesc; Attendance: 0 Referee: Sebastian Colțescu (Craiova)

20 March 2022 2	Dinamo București	0–0	Sepsi Sfântu Gheorghe	Bucharest
16:00 EET (UTC+2)	Filip (yellow card) 6'; Jovanović (yellow card) 13'; Grădinaru (yellow card) 45'; Irobiso (yellow card) 89'	Report		Stadium: Stadionul Dinamo; Attendance: 1,500; Referee: Iulian Dima (Bucharest)

====== April ======
1 April 2022 3	Chindia Târgoviște	0–2	Dinamo București	Ploiești
20:30 EEST (UTC+3)	Iacob (yellow card) 37'; Passaglia (yellow card) 79'	Report	Pierret (yellow card) 52'; Morar 66'; Morar (yellow card) 67'; Irobiso 81'; Eșanu (yellow card) 89'	Stadium: Ilie Oană Stadium; Attendance: 2,000; Referee: Andrei Chivulete (Bucharest)

8 April 2022 4	Dinamo București	1–2	FC U Craiova 1948	Bucharest
20:30 EEST (UTC+3)	Irobiso 1'; Matei (yellow card) 77'; Ivanovski (yellow card) 83'	Report	Huyghebaert 50'; Kovačić (yellow card) 76'; Albu (yellow card) 82'; Achim (yellow card) 88'; Compagno 90+1'; Compagno (yellow card) 90+2'; Ondaan (yellow card) 90+4'	Stadium: Stadionul Dinamo; Attendance: 3,500; Referee: Marian Barbu (Făgăraș)

15 April 2022 5	Mioveni	2–0	Dinamo București	Mioveni
20:30 EEST (UTC+3)	Panait 71'; Panait (yellow card) 80'; Balaur (yellow card) 80'; Sanoh 84'; Oancea (yellow card) 87'	Report	Filip (yellow card) 24'; Gabriel (yellow card) 45'; Pierret (yellow card) 70'; Irobiso (red card) 79'; Răuță (yellow card) 83'; Grădinaru (yellow card) 87'	Stadium: Stadionul Orășenesc; Attendance: 2,800; Referee: Adrian Cojocaru (Galati)

22 April 2022 6	Gaz Metan Mediaș	0–1	Dinamo București	Mediaș
20:00 EEST (UTC+3)	Francisco Júnior (yellow card) 44'; Kanda (yellow card) 80'	Report	Radu (yellow card) 32'; Carp 41'; Răuță (yellow card) 52'; Carp (yellow card) 70'; Pierret (yellow card) 71'; Torje (yellow card) 79'	Stadium: Stadionul Gaz Metan; Referee: Robert Avram (Pitesti)

30 April 2022 7	Dinamo București	5–1	Academica Clinceni	Bucharest
12:30 EEST (UTC+3)	Filip (yellow card) 37'; Grădinaru (yellow card) 37'; Ivanovski 55'; Ivanov 58'; Patriche (yellow card) 70'; Morar 76', 78'; Azankpo 86'	Report	Rufati (red card) 50'; Florică (yellow card) 59'; Massaro 88'	Stadium: Stadionul Dinamo; Attendance: 1,000; Referee: Sorin Antonie (Bucharest)

====== May ======
6 May 2022 8	Botoșani	2–3	Dinamo București	Botoșani
20:30 EEST (UTC+3)	Braun (yellow card) 18'; Roman (yellow card) 26'; Jája 31'; Țigănașu (yellow card) 39'; Tîrcoveanu (yellow card) 43'; Roman 54'; Pap (yellow card) 90+3'	Report	Pierret 7', 44'; Pierret (yellow card) 18' (yellow-red card) 45+1'; Morar (yellow card) 46'; Torje (yellow card) 60'; Crețu 68'; Cristiano (yellow card) 87'; Rodríguez (yellow card) 90+1'; Grădinaru (red card) 90+4'	Stadium: Stadionul Municipal; Attendance: 1,500; Referee: Andrei Moroiţă (Ploiesti)

13 May 2022 9	Dinamo București	1–1	UTA	Bucharest
20:30 EEST (UTC+3)	Torje (yellow card) 55'; Gabriel (yellow card) 60'; Irobiso 84'; Irobiso (yellow card) 90'	Report	Dima (yellow card) 33'; Vorobjovas (yellow card) 33'; Dumitru 39'; Pop (yellow card) 81'; Batha (yellow card) 87'	Stadium: Stadionul Dinamo; Attendance: 2,124; Referee: Iulian Călin (Ștefănești, Argeș)

=== Promotion/relegation play-off ===
21 May 2022	Universitatea Cluj	2–0	Dinamo București	Cluj-Napoca
20:30 EEST (UTC+3)	Remacle 14'; Fernandes (yellow card) 39' (yellow-red card) 72'; Pires (yellow card) 50'; Boiciuc (yellow card) 57'; Ispas (yellow card) 70'; Boiciuc 83'	Report	Eșanu (yellow card) 14'	Stadium: Cluj Arena; Attendance: 20,000; Referee: Cătălin Popa (Pitești)

29 May 2022	Dinamo București	1–1	Universitatea Cluj	Bucharest
21:00 EEST (UTC+3)	Morar (yellow card) 5'; Morar 19'; Răuță (yellow card) 24'; Radu (yellow card) 82'	Report	Tescan 17'; Ribeiro (yellow card) 25'; Gorcea (yellow card) 75'; Ispas (yellow card) 90+3'	Stadium: Stadionul Dinamo; Attendance: 11,523; Referee: Adrian Cojocaru (Galati)

=== Cupa României ===
23 September 2021 Round of 32	Ripensia Timișoara	0–1	Dinamo București	Timișoara
18:45 EEST (UTC+3)	Țieranu (yellow card) 89'	Report	Matei 36'; Itu (yellow card) 90+3'	Stadium: Stadionul Dan Păltinișanu; Referee: Viorel Flueran (Craiova)

26 October 2021 Round of 16	Dinamo București	1–2	Argeș	Bucharest
21:00 EET (UTC+2)	Moldoveanu (yellow card) 14'; Nica (yellow card) 35'; Țîră 49'; Radu (yellow card) 84'	Report	Ișfan 77'; Dumitru 90+3'	Stadium: Stadionul Dinamo; Referee: Ovidiu Hațegan (Arad)

== Statistics ==
=== Appearances and goals ===
As of match played 29 May 2022

No.	Pos	Nat	Player	Total		Liga I		Cupa României		play-off	
No.	Pos	Nat	Player	Apps	Goals	Apps	Goals	Apps	Goals	Apps	Goals
2	DF	(Brazil) BRA	Gabriel	11	0	8+2	0	0	0	1	0
3	DF	(Romania) ROU	Andrei Radu	30	0	23+4	0	2	0	1	0
4	DF	(Croatia) CRO	Igor Jovanović	7	0	7	0	0	0	0	0
5	MF	(Romania) ROU	Alexandru Răuță	30	0	25+3	0	1	0	1	0
6	DF	(Romania) ROU	Marco Ehmann	21	0	13+7	0	1	0	0	0
7	DF	(Romania) ROU	Steliano Filip	25	0	20+2	0	1	0	1+1	0
8	MF	(France) FRA	Balthazar Pierret	17	2	14+1	2	0	0	2	0
9	FW	(Benin) BEN	Désiré Segbé Azankpo	2	1	0+2	1	0	0	0	0
10	MF	(Romania) ROU	Cosmin Matei	24	3	17+3	2	2	1	2	0
12	GK	(Romania) ROU	Mihai Eșanu	23	0	19	0	2	0	2	0
13	GK	(Portugal) POR	Cristiano	8	0	8	0	0	0	0	0
15	MF	(Romania) ROU	Claudiu Stan	1	0	0+1	0	0	0	0	0
17	DF	(Romania) ROU	Alin Dudea	4	0	2+1	0	0+1	0	0	0
18	MF	(Argentina) ARG	Rodríguez	16	0	11+4	0	0	0	0+1	0
19	DF	(France) FRA	Baptiste Aloé	10	1	7+1	1	0	0	2	0
20	MF	(Romania) ROU	Antonio Bordușanu	17	1	10+6	1	0	0	1	0
21	MF	(Romania) ROU	Răzvan Grădinaru	12	0	10+1	0	0	0	1	0
22	MF	(Romania) ROU	Gabriel Torje	26	6	19+4	6	1	0	2	0
23	DF	(Romania) ROU	Răzvan Patriche	12	1	10+1	1	0	0	0+1	0
24	DF	(Romania) ROU	Deniz Giafer	15	0	11+4	0	0	0	0	0
26	DF	(Romania) ROU	Marius Tomozei	3	0	3	0	0	0	0	0
27	DF	(Romania) ROU	Ricardo Grigore	22	0	15+5	0	2	0	0	0
28	MF	(Romania) ROU	Valentin Borcea	5	0	0+5	0	0	0	0	0
29	FW	(Romania) ROU	Cătălin Măgureanu	9	0	5+4	0	0	0	0	0
32	MF	(Romania) ROU	Geani Crețu	27	1	12+12	1	0+1	0	1+1	0
34	GK	(France) FRA	Thomas Chesneau	2	0	2	0	0	0	0	0
35	FW	(Nigeria) NGA	Christian Irobiso	8	3	5+1	3	0	0	2	0
38	MF	(Romania) ROU	Andrei Bani	28	0	12+14	0	1	0	0+1	0
44	FW	(North Macedonia) MKD	Mirko Ivanovski	27	4	19+7	4	0	0	0+1	0
55	MF	(Serbia) SRB	Dušan Čelar	2	0	1+1	0	0	0	0	0
70	FW	(Romania) ROU	Vlad Morar	14	5	8+4	4	0	0	1+1	1
71	MF	(Moldova) MDA	Cătălin Carp	15	2	11+2	2	0	0	2	0
75	DF	(Romania) ROU	Costin Amzar	10	0	4+5	0	0+1	0	0	0
77	DF	(Romania) ROU	Alin Buleică	10	0	8+2	0	0	0	0	0
82	MF	(Romania) ROU	Roberto Diniță	1	0	1	0	0	0	0	0
84	DF	(Romania) ROU	David Țone	2	0	0+2	0	0	0	0	0
98	MF	(Romania) ROU	Andreas Mihaiu	10	1	4+6	1	0	0	0	0
99	MF	(Bulgaria) BUL	Antoni Ivanov	12	1	6+6	1	0	0	0	0
Players sold, released or loaned out during the season:
2	DF	(Romania) ROU	Constantin Nica	1	0	0	0	0+1	0	0	0
4	DF	(Portugal) POR	André Pinto	9	0	9	0	0	0	0	0
8	MF	(Romania) ROU	Paul Anton	1	0	1	0	0	0	0	0
8	MF	(Romania) ROU	Cătălin Itu	15	0	10+3	0	2	0	0	0
16	DF	(Greece) GRE	Nikos Kenourgios	7	0	6+1	0	0	0	0	0
18	FW	(Romania) ROU	Cătălin Țîră	8	1	1+5	0	1+1	1	0	0
21	FW	(Romania) ROU	Mihai Neicuțescu	6	0	0+4	0	1+1	0	0	0
22	MF	(Romania) ROU	Deian Sorescu	20	8	19	8	1	0	0	0
26	MF	(Romania) ROU	Andrei Florescu	4	0	1+3	0	0	0	0	0
26	DF	(Austria) AUT	Petar Gluhakovic	2	0	2	0	0	0	0	0
30	MF	(France) FRA	Michel Espinosa	4	0	3	0	1	0	0	0
35	DF	(Romania) ROU	Răzvan Popa	8	0	6+1	0	1	0	0	0
91	GK	(Bulgaria) BUL	Plamen Iliev	10	0	10	0	0	0	0	0
93	FW	(Slovenia) SVN	Marko Nunić	5	0	1+4	0	0	0	0	0
96	FW	(Slovakia) SVK	Tomáš Vestenický	7	0	1+5	0	0+1	0	0	0
99	FW	(Romania) ROU	Robert Moldoveanu	13	0	9+2	0	2	0	0	0

=== Disciplinary record ===
As of match played 29 May 2022

Rank	No.	Nat.	Po.	Name	Liga I + play-off			Cupa României			Total		
Rank	No.	Nat.	Po.	Name	Booked	(yellow card) (yellow-red card)	Sent off (straight red)	Booked	(yellow card) (yellow-red card)	Sent off (straight red)	Booked	(yellow card) (yellow-red card)	Sent off (straight red)
1	5	(Romania)	MF	Alexandru Răuță	13	2	0	0	0	0	13	2	0
2	7	(Romania)	DF	Steliano Filip	10	1	1	0	0	0	10	1	1
3	8	(France)	MF	Balthazar Pierret	7	1	0	0	0	0	7	1	0
3	9	(Romania)	MF	Gabriel Torje	8	0	0	0	0	0	8	0	0
3	3	(Romania)	DF	Andrei Radu	7	0	0	1	0	0	8	0	0
4	22	(Romania)	MF	Deian Sorescu	7	0	0	0	0	0	7	0	0
5	99	(Romania)	FW	Robert Moldoveanu	4	0	0	1	0	0	5	0	0
5	6	(Romania)	DF	Marco Ehmann	4	1	0	0	0	0	4	1	0
5	44	(North Macedonia)	FW	Mirko Ivanovski	5	0	0	0	0	0	5	0	0
5	10	(Romania)	MF	Cosmin Matei	5	0	0	0	0	0	5	0	0
6	32	(Romania)	MF	Geani Crețu	4	0	0	0	0	0	4	0	0
6	23	(Romania)	DF	Răzvan Patriche	4	0	0	0	0	0	4	0	0
6	21	(Romania)	MF	Răzvan Grădinaru	3	0	1	0	0	0	3	0	1
6	18	(Argentina)	MF	Jonathan Rodríguez	4	0	0	0	0	0	4	0	0
6	12	(Romania)	GK	Mihai Eșanu	4	0	0	0	0	0	4	0	0
7	24	(Romania)	DF	Deniz Giafer	2	1	0	0	0	0	2	1	0
7	27	(Romania)	DF	Ricardo Grigore	3	0	0	0	0	0	3	0	0
7	71	(Moldova)	MF	Cătălin Carp	3	0	0	0	0	0	3	0	0
7	19	(France)	DF	Baptiste Aloé	2	0	1	0	0	0	2	0	1
7	13	(Portugal)	GK	Cristiano	3	0	0	0	0	0	3	0	0
7	35	(Nigeria)	FW	Christian Irobiso	2	0	1	0	0	0	2	0	1
7	70	(Romania)	FW	Vlad Morar	3	0	0	0	0	0	3	0	0
8	8	(Romania)	MF	Cătălin Itu	1	0	0	1	0	0	2	0	0
8	91	(Bulgaria)	GK	Plamen Iliev	2	0	0	0	0	0	2	0	0
8	2	(Brazil)	DF	Gabriel	2	0	0	0	0	0	2	0	0
9	17	(Romania)	DF	Alin Dudea	0	0	1	0	0	0	0	0	1
9	18	(Romania)	FW	Cătălin Țîră	1	0	0	0	0	0	1	0	0
9	2	(Romania)	DF	Constantin Nica	0	0	0	1	0	0	1	0	0
9	38	(Romania)	MF	Andrei Bani	1	0	0	0	0	0	1	0	0
9	30	(France)	MF	Michel Espinosa	1	0	0	0	0	0	1	0	0
9	93	(Slovenia)	FW	Marko Nunić	1	0	0	0	0	0	1	0	0
9	4	(Portugal)	DF	André Pinto	1	0	0	0	0	0	1	0	0
9	16	(Greece)	DF	Nikos Kenourgios	1	0	0	0	0	0	1	0	0
9	26	(Romania)	DF	Marius Tomozei	1	0	0	0	0	0	1	0	0
9	9	(Benin)	FW	Désiré Segbé Azankpo	1	0	0	0	0	0	1	0	0
9	55	(Serbia)	MF	Dušan Čelar	1	0	0	0	0	0	1	0	0
9	77	(Romania)	DF	Alin Buleică	1	0	0	0	0	0	1	0	0
9	99	(Bulgaria)	MF	Antoni Ivanov	1	0	0	0	0	0	1	0	0
9	4	(Croatia)	DF	Igor Jovanović	1	0	0	0	0	0	1	0	0
Total					124	6	5	4	0	0	128	6	5

== Transfers ==
=== Transfers in ===
Date	Position	Nationality	Name	From	Fee	Ref.
2 September 2021	RB	(Romania)	Constantin Nica	(Serbia) Vojvodina	Free	
3 September 2021	CB	(Romania)	Răzvan Popa	Politehnica Iași	Free	
4 September 2021	AM	(Romania)	Cosmin Matei	Farul Constanța	Free	
4 September 2021	RW	(Romania)	Gabriel Torje	(Turkey) Bandırmaspor	Free	
9 September 2021	GK	(Bulgaria)	Plamen Iliev	(Bulgaria) Ludogorets Razgrad	Free	
9 September 2021	FW	(Romania)	Cătălin Țîră	(Lithuania) Sūduva	Free	
9 September 2021	FW	(North Macedonia)	Mirko Ivanovski	(Hungary) Diósgyőr	Free	
21 September 2021	CB	(Portugal)	André Pinto	(Portugal) Farense	Free	
14 October 2021	CM	(France)	Michel Espinosa	(Bulgaria) Botev Plovdiv	Free	
19 October 2021	ST	(Slovakia)	Tomáš Vestenický	(Russia) Chayka Peschanokopskoye	Free	
27 October 2021	LB	(Greece)	Nikos Kenourgios	(Belgium) Zulte Waregem	Free	
28 October 2021	DM	(Moldova)	Cătălin Carp	(Russia) Tambov	Free	
29 October 2021	ST	(Slovenia)	Marko Nunić	(Greece) AEL	Free	
17 November 2021	RB	(Austria)	Petar Gluhakovic	(Croatia) Lokomotiva	Free	
4 January 2022	CB	(Romania)	Răzvan Patriche	Academica Clinceni	Free	
11 January 2022	RB	(Romania)	Marius Tomozei	UTA	Free	
18 January 2022	CB	(Croatia)	Igor Jovanović	(Lithuania) Sūduva	Free	
18 January 2022	DM	(France)	Balthazar Pierret	(France) Boulogne	Free	
18 January 2022	RW	(Romania)	Alin Buleică	Viitorul Târgu Jiu	Free	
21 January 2022	GK	(Portugal)	Cristiano	CFR Cluj	Free	
3 February 2022	CB	(France)	Baptiste Aloé	(Portugal) Arouca	Free	
18 February 2022	RB	(Brazil)	Gabriel	Gaz Metan Mediaș	Free	
18 February 2022	CM	(Romania)	Răzvan Grădinaru	Gaz Metan Mediaș	Free	
18 February 2022	FW	(Romania)	Vlad Morar	Gaz Metan Mediaș	Free	
11 March 2022	ST	(Nigeria)	Christian Irobiso	Gaz Metan Mediaș	Free	

=== Loans in ===
Date from	Position	Nationality	Name	From	Date until	Ref.
6 September 2021	CM	(Romania)	Cătălin Itu	CFR Cluj	31 December 2021	
18 January 2022	GK	(France)	Thomas Chesneau	Concordia Chiajna	End of season	
25 January 2022	CM	(Argentina)	Jonathan Rodríguez	CFR Cluj	End of season	
25 January 2022	CM	(Serbia)	Dušan Čelar	CFR Cluj	End of season	
27 January 2022	CM	(Bulgaria)	Antoni Ivanov	Universitatea Craiova	End of season	
1 February 2022	FW	(Benin)	Désiré Segbé Azankpo	(France) Dunkerque	End of season	

=== Loans out ===
Date from	Position	Nationality	Name	To	Date until	Ref.
1 July 2021	CM	(Romania)	Liviu Gheorghe	Înainte Modelu	30 June 2022	
21 July 2021	FW	(Romania)	Gabriel Răducan	Dacia Unirea Brăila	30 June 2022	
7 September 2021	LW	(Romania)	Andrei Florescu	Metaloglobus București	30 June 2022	

=== Transfers out ===
Date	Position	Nationality	Name	To	Fee	Ref.
19 January 2022	RM	(Romania)	Deian Sorescu	(Poland) Raków Częstochowa	800,000 Euro	
15 February 2022	GK	(Bulgaria)	Plamen Iliev	Hermannstadt	Undisclosed	

=== Released ===
Date	Position	Nationality	Name	Subsequent club	Joined date	Ref.
24 May 2021	CB	(Romania)	Florin Bejan	Hermannstadt	19 June 2019	
30 May 2021	CB	(Spain)	Raúl Albentosa	(Denmark) Vejle	1 April 2021	
1 June 2021	GK	(Norway)	Gudmund Kongshavn	Retired	8 February 2021	
1 June 2021	AM	(Curaçao)	Gevaro Nepomuceno	(Bulgaria) Cherno More	22 January 2021	
1 June 2021	ST	(Nigeria)	Joseph Akpala	Retired	7 April 2021	
17 June 2021	AM	(Romania)	Andrei Blejdea	Universitatea Cluj	8 January 2021	
30 June 2021	DM	(Romania)	Ionuț Șerban	Blejoi	July 2013	
8 July 2021	CM	(Poland)	Janusz Gol	(Poland) Górnik Łęczna	25 August 2020	
13 July 2021	CB	(Croatia)	Ante Puljić	(Israel) Bnei Sakhnin	5 September 2019	
13 July 2021	AM	(Italy)	Diego Fabbrini	(Italy) Ascoli	22 August 2019	
13 July 2021	ST	(Slovakia)	Adam Nemec	Voluntari	29 August 2020	
13 July 2021	CM	(Romania)	Vlad Achim	FCU Craiova 1948	18 August 2020	
26 August 2021	DM	(Romania)	Paul Anton	(Spain) Ponferradina	2 October 2020	
5 January 2022	RB	(Austria)	Petar Gluhakovic	(Austria) SV Stripfing	17 November 2021	
5 January 2022	ST	(Slovakia)	Tomáš Vestenický	(Lithuania) FK Riteriai	19 October 2021	
5 January 2022	FW	(Romania)	Mihai Neicuțescu	FC Buzău	2017	
10 January 2022	FW	(Romania)	Robert Moldoveanu	Farul Constanța	2015	
19 January 2022	CB	(Portugal)	André Pinto		21 September 2021	
19 January 2022	FW	(Romania)	Cătălin Țîră	(Italy) Bisceglie	9 September 2021	
19 January 2022	CB	(Romania)	Răzvan Popa		3 September 2021	
19 January 2022	CM	(France)	Michel Espinosa	(Belgium) Virton	14 October 2021	
29 January 2022	RB	(Romania)	Constantin Nica	(Italy) Pistoiese	2 September 2021	
31 January 2022	ST	(Slovenia)	Marko Nunić	(Cyprus) PAEEK	29 October 2021	
31 March 2022	LB	(Greece)	Nikos Kenourgios	(Greece) Athens Kallithea	27 October 2021	
