= List of Romanian football transfers winter 2021–22 =

This is a list of Romanian football transfers for the 2021–22 winter transfer window. Only moves featuring 2021–22 Liga I are listed.

== Liga I ==
=== Academica Clinceni ===
In:

No.	Pos.	Nation	Player
1	GK	(Romania) ROU	Mirel Bolboașă (from Hermannstadt)
3	DF	(Romania) ROU	Luca Florică (on loan from Rapid București)
4	DF	(Czech Republic) CZE	Pavel Čmovš (from (Slovakia) Pohronie)
5	DF	(Romania) ROU	Cătălin Ion (from Reșița)
6	MF	(Bulgaria) BUL	Vladimir Gogov (from (Bulgaria) CSKA 1948 Sofia)
7	FW	(Italy) ITA	Davide Massaro (from Mioveni)
8	MF	(Bulgaria) BUL	Aleksandar Tsvetkov (from (Bulgaria) Beroe Stara Zagora)
9	FW	(Croatia) CRO	Stipe Plazibat (from (Singapore) Lion City Sailors)
10	MF	(Palestine) PLE	Muhamed Alghoul (from (Croatia) Dubrava)
19	DF	(North Macedonia) MKD	Agron Rufati (from (Ukraine) Zorya Luhansk)
24	DF	(Romania) ROU	Andrei Iana (from Reșița)
28	DF	(Belgium) BEL	Ayrton Mboko (Free agent)
29	DF	(France) FRA	Jérémy Corinus (from (Italy) Fermana)
31	MF	(Croatia) CRO	Mario Vrdoljak (from (Italy) Grosseto)

Out:

No.	Pos.	Nation	Player
1	GK	(Romania) ROU	Ștefan Dobre (loan return to Ripensia Timișoara)
3	DF	(Romania) ROU	Florin Achim (to FCSB)
4	DF	(Albania) ALB	Amir Bilali (to (Hungary) Mezőkövesd)
5	DF	(Romania) ROU	Florin Gardoș (Free agent)
6	DF	(Bulgaria) BUL	Georgi Pashov (Free agent)
7	MF	(France) FRA	Thibault Moulin (to (Poland) Wieczysta Kraków)
8	MF	(Bulgaria) BUL	Asen Chandarov (to (Bulgaria) Septemvri Sofia)
9	FW	(Romania) ROU	Cristian Gavra (to Ripensia Timișoara)
10	FW	(Belgium) BEL	Floriano Vanzo (to Politehnica Iași)
11	FW	(Greece) GRE	Apostolos Vellios (to (Greece) Lamia)
12	GK	(Romania) ROU	Aurelian Păun (to Universitatea Cluj)
19	MF	(Slovakia) SVK	Denis Ventúra (to (Hungary) Gyirmót)
22	DF	(Romania) ROU	Paul Pîrvulescu (to Universitatea Cluj)
24	MF	(Romania) ROU	Marius Cioiu (to Petrolul Ploiești)
27	MF	(Lithuania) LTU	Donatas Kazlauskas (to (Lithuania) Žalgiris)
28	MF	(Argentina) ARG	Juan Cascini (Free agent)
29	DF	(Romania) ROU	Răzvan Patriche (to Dinamo București)
88	MF	(Romania) ROU	Lucian Filip (Retired)
92	MF	(Nigeria) NGA	Michael Omoh (to Farul Constanța)

=== Argeș Pitești ===
In:

No.	Pos.	Nation	Player
17	DF	(Romania) ROU	Alin Dobrosavlevici (from Farul Constanța)
19	FW	(Romania) ROU	George Ganea (on loan from Farul Constanța)
33	GK	(Romania) ROU	George Micle (loan return from Universitatea Cluj)
—	FW	(Liberia) LBR	Emmanuel Ernest (from Ripensia Timișoara)

Out:

No.	Pos.	Nation	Player
15	FW	(Romania) ROU	Tiberiu Coman (to Mioveni)
16	FW	(Brazil) BRA	Ruan Teles (to (Kazakhstan) Caspiy)
17	DF	(Romania) ROU	Andrei Pițian (to Chindia Târgoviște)
19	DF	(Belgium) BEL	Jimmy De Jonghe (Free agent)
24	DF	(Romania) ROU	Tudor Telcean (loan return to Universitatea Cluj)

=== Botoșani ===
In:

No.	Pos.	Nation	Player
2	DF	(Romania) ROU	Denis Haruț (on loan from FCSB)
6	MF	(Romania) ROU	Victor Dican (from Universitatea Cluj)
14	FW	(Montenegro) MNE	Sergej Grubač (Free agent)
20	FW	(Romania) ROU	Mihai Roman (from Universitatea Craiova)
24	MF	(Romania) ROU	Sebastian Mailat (from CFR Cluj)
98	FW	(Liberia) LBR	Terrence Tisdell (from (Turkey) Kocaelispor)
—	FW	(Colombia) COL	Brayan Torres (loan return from Politehnica Iași)

Out:

No.	Pos.	Nation	Player
10	MF	(France) FRA	Hervin Ongenda (to (Cyprus) Apollon Limassol)
18	MF	(France) FRA	Malcom Edjouma (to FCSB)
20	DF	(Romania) ROU	Adrian Moescu (on loan to Dante Botoșani)
24	FW	(France) FRA	Richard Sila (to Chindia Târgoviște)
25	DF	(Romania) ROU	Bogdan Racovițan (to (Poland) Raków Częstochowa)
44	MF	(Belgium) BEL	Martin Remacle (on loan to Universitatea Cluj)
70	GK	(Romania) ROU	David Duțu (to Minaur Baia Mare)
89	FW	(Democratic Republic of the Congo) COD	Hervé Kage (to (Belgium) Virton)
90	FW	(Ghana) GHA	Paul Mensah (to (Austria) Blau-Weiß Linz)

=== CFR Cluj ===
In:

No.	Pos.	Nation	Player
5	DF	(Bulgaria) BUL	Kristian Dimitrov (on loan from (Croatia) Hajduk Split)
14	MF	(Romania) ROU	Raoul Mal (from (Italy) Pistoiese)
17	FW	(Croatia) CRO	Marko Dugandžić (from (Russia) Sochi)
20	FW	(Romania) ROU	Cristian Neguț (on loan from Chindia Târgoviște)
30	FW	(Romania) ROU	Daniel Birligea (from (Italy) Teramo)
44	DF	(Brazil) BRA	Yuri Matias (from Gaz Metan Mediaș)
77	MF	(Brazil) BRA	Roger (from UTA Arad)
90	GK	(Romania) ROU	Răzvan Sava (from (Italy) Torino)
94	MF	(Romania) ROU	Cătălin Itu (loan return from Dinamo București)
99	FW	(Romania) ROU	Sergiu Buș (from (South Korea) Seongnam)

Out:

No.	Pos.	Nation	Player
5	MF	(Argentina) ARG	Jonathan Rodríguez (on loan to Dinamo București)
13	DF	(Romania) ROU	Denis Ciobotariu (on loan to Voluntari)
17	DF	(Romania) ROU	Mihai Butean (on loan to Chindia Târgoviște)
19	MF	(Argentina) ARG	Emmanuel Culio (Free agent)
20	FW	(Moldova) MDA	Gheorghe Gondiu (on loan to Minaur Baia Mare)
23	GK	(Portugal) POR	Cristiano Figueiredo (to Dinamo București)
77	FW	(Romania) ROU	Denis Alibec (loan return to (Turkey) Kayserispor, later on loan to (Greece) Atromitos)
86	MF	(Romania) ROU	Denis Rusu (on loan to Chindia Târgoviște)
92	DF	(Democratic Republic of the Congo) COD	Mike Cestor (Free agent)
—	DF	(Romania) ROU	Alex Pașcanu (to (Spain) Ponferradina, previously on loan)
—	MF	(Romania) ROU	Răzvan Andronic (to Brașov)
—	MF	(Romania) ROU	Sebastian Mailat (to Botoșani)
—	MF	(Morocco) MAR	Anas Tahiri (to (Netherlands) Heerenveen)
—	FW	(Serbia) SRB	Dušan Čelar (on loan to Dinamo București)
—	FW	(Romania) ROU	Daniel Paraschiv (on loan to Hermannstadt, previously on loan at Voluntari)

=== Chindia Târgoviște ===
In:

No.	Pos.	Nation	Player
4	MF	(Argentina) ARG	Juan Pablo Passaglia (from UTA Arad)
10	FW	(Bulgaria) BUL	Tsvetelin Chunchukov (on loan from Sepsi Sfântu Gheorghe)
14	FW	(France) FRA	Richard Sila (from Botoșani)
16	DF	(Romania) ROU	Mihai Butean (on loan from CFR Cluj)
22	DF	(Romania) ROU	Andrei Pițian (from Argeș Pitești)
86	MF	(Romania) ROU	Denis Rusu (on loan from CFR Cluj)

Out:

No.	Pos.	Nation	Player
9	MF	(Romania) ROU	Răzvan Matiș (loan return to Farul Constanța, later on loan to Concordia Chiajna)
10	FW	(Romania) ROU	Cristian Neguț (on loan to CFR Cluj)
19	FW	(Romania) ROU	Daniel Popa (to (South Korea) Daejeon Hana Citizen)
22	MF	(Romania) ROU	Sergiu Suciu (to (Italy) Pistoiese)
39	MF	(Romania) ROU	Adrian Stoian (Free agent)

=== Dinamo București ===
In:

No.	Pos.	Nation	Player
2	DF	(Brazil) BRA	Gabriel Moura (from Gaz Metan Mediaș)
4	DF	(Croatia) CRO	Igor Jovanović (from (Lithuania) Sūduva)
8	MF	(France) FRA	Balthazar Pierret (from (France) Boulogne)
9	FW	(Benin) BEN	Désiré Segbé Azankpo (on loan from (France) Dunkerque)
13	GK	(Portugal) POR	Cristiano Figueiredo (from CFR Cluj)
18	MF	(Argentina) ARG	Jonathan Rodríguez (on loan from CFR Cluj)
19	DF	(France) FRA	Baptiste Aloé (Free agent)
21	MF	(Romania) ROU	Răzvan Grădinaru (from Gaz Metan Mediaș)
23	DF	(Romania) ROU	Răzvan Patriche (from Academica Clinceni)
26	DF	(Romania) ROU	Marius Tomozei (from UTA Arad)
34	GK	(France) FRA	Thomas Chesneau (on loan from Concordia Chiajna)
55	FW	(Serbia) SRB	Dušan Čelar (on loan from CFR Cluj)
70	FW	(Romania) ROU	Vlad Morar (from Gaz Metan Mediaș)
77	DF	(Romania) ROU	Alin Buleică (from Viitorul Târgu Jiu)
99	MF	(Bulgaria) BUL	Antoni Ivanov (on loan from Universitatea Craiova)

Out:

No.	Pos.	Nation	Player
2	DF	(Romania) ROU	Constantin Nica (to (Italy) Pistoiese)
4	DF	(Portugal) POR	André Pinto (Free agent)
8	MF	(Romania) ROU	Cătălin Itu (loan return to CFR Cluj)
17	DF	(Romania) ROU	Alin Dudea (to Reșița)
18	FW	(Romania) ROU	Cătălin Țîră (to (Italy) Bisceglie)
21	FW	(Romania) ROU	Mihai Neicuțescu (to Buzău)
22	MF	(Romania) ROU	Deian Sorescu (to (Poland) Raków Częstochowa)
26	DF	(Austria) AUT	Petar Gluhakovic (to (Austria) Stripfing)
30	MF	(France) FRA	Michel Espinosa (Free agent)
35	DF	(Romania) ROU	Răzvan Popa (Free agent)
91	GK	(Bulgaria) BUL	Plamen Iliev (to Hermannstadt)
93	FW	(Slovenia) SVN	Marko Nunić (to (Cyprus) PAEEK)
96	FW	(Slovakia) SVK	Tomáš Vestenický (Free agent)
99	FW	(Romania) ROU	Robert Moldoveanu (to Farul Constanța)

=== Farul Constanța ===
In:

No.	Pos.	Nation	Player
16	MF	(Romania) ROU	Dragoș Nedelcu (on loan from FCSB, previously on loan at (Germany) Fortuna Düsseldorf)
19	FW	(Romania) ROU	Robert Moldoveanu (from Dinamo București)
28	FW	(Romania) ROU	Gabriel Iancu (on loan from (Russia) Akhmat Grozny)
92	FW	(Nigeria) NGA	Michael Omoh (from Academica Clinceni)

Out:

No.	Pos.	Nation	Player
7	FW	(Romania) ROU	George Ganea (on loan to Argeș Pitești)
8	MF	(Romania) ROU	Carlo Casap (on loan to Concordia Chiajna)
21	DF	(Romania) ROU	Alin Dobrosavlevici (to Argeș Pitești)
23	DF	(Romania) ROU	Virgil Ghiță (to (Poland) Cracovia)
25	FW	(Romania) ROU	Aurelian Chițu (to FC U Craiova)
27	FW	(Cape Verde) CPV	Ely Fernandes (to Universitatea Cluj)
52	MF	(Brazil) BRA	Romário Pires (to Universitatea Cluj)
—	GK	(Romania) ROU	Cosmin Dur-Bozoancă (to Oțelul Galați)
—	MF	(Romania) ROU	Răzvan Matiș (on loan to Concordia Chiajna, previously on loan at Chindia Târgoviște)

=== FC U Craiova ===
In:

No.	Pos.	Nation	Player
—	DF	(Romania) ROU	Gabriel Enache (from (Kazakhstan) Zhetysu)
—	FW	(Romania) ROU	Aurelian Chițu (from Farul Constanța)

Out:

No.	Pos.	Nation	Player
7	FW	(Portugal) POR	Hugo Vieira (to (Malta) Hibernians)
17	MF	(Romania) ROU	Alexandru Raicea (on loan to Mioveni)
18	DF	(Ivory Coast) CIV	Mamadou Bagayoko (Free agent)
25	DF	(Serbia) SRB	Marko Gajić (to (Serbia) Radnički 1923)
44	DF	(Portugal) POR	Pedro Machado (to (Portugal) Torreense)
94	GK	(Austria) AUT	Armin Gremsl (to (Austria) Rheindorf Altach)

=== FCSB ===
In:

No.	Pos.	Nation	Player
18	MF	(France) FRA	Malcom Edjouma (from Botoșani)
21	DF	(Romania) ROU	Florin Achim (from Academica Clinceni)
—	FW	(Romania) ROU	Andrei Istrate (loan return from Politehnica Iași)

Out:

No.	Pos.	Nation	Player
6	DF	(Romania) ROU	Denis Haruț (on loan to Botoșani)
11	MF	(Romania) ROU	Constantin Budescu (to Voluntari)
16	MF	(Romania) ROU	Dragoș Nedelcu (on loan to Farul Constanța, previously on loan at (Germany) Fortuna Düsseldorf)
—	MF	(Romania) ROU	Mihai Lixandru (on loan to Mioveni, previously on loan at Gaz Metan Mediaș)

=== Gaz Metan Mediaș ===
In:

No.	Pos.	Nation	Player

Out:

No.	Pos.	Nation	Player
1	GK	(Romania) ROU	Octavian Vâlceanu (Free agent)
2	DF	(Brazil) BRA	Gabriel Moura (to Dinamo București)
3	DF	(Brazil) BRA	Yuri Matias (to CFR Cluj)
4	MF	(Romania) ROU	Ioan Filip (to Universitatea Cluj)
5	MF	(Portugal) POR	Diogo Izata (on loan to (Slovenia) Koper)
6	MF	(Romania) ROU	Mihai Lixandru (loan return to FCSB, later on loan to Mioveni)
7	MF	(Romania) ROU	Răzvan Trif (to Mioveni)
10	MF	(Romania) ROU	Ronaldo Deaconu (to (China) Shaanxi Chang'an Athletic)
19	FW	(Czech Republic) CZE	Tomáš Smola (Retired)
20	MF	(Republic of the Congo) CGO	Yves Pambou (Free agent)
23	MF	(Romania) ROU	Răzvan Grădinaru (to Dinamo București)
24	DF	(Italy) ITA	Roberto Romeo (to Universitatea Cluj)
26	FW	(Romania) ROU	Gabriel Plumbuitu (on loan to Politehnica Timișoara, previously on loan at Metaloglobus București)
33	DF	(Romania) ROU	Răzvan Horj (to Petrolul Ploiești)
71	FW	(Romania) ROU	Vlad Morar (to Dinamo București)
77	FW	(Senegal) SEN	Adama Sarr (Free agent)
92	MF	(Haiti) HAI	Bryan Alceus (to (Azerbaijan) Zira)
98	DF	(Romania) ROU	Mihai Velisar (to Petrolul Ploiești)

=== Mioveni ===
In:

No.	Pos.	Nation	Player
2	MF	(Romania) ROU	Vlad Mitrea (from Sepsi Sfântu Gheorghe)
3	DF	(Romania) ROU	Răzvan Trif (from Gaz Metan Mediaș)
4	MF	(Romania) ROU	Mihai Lixandru (on loan from FCSB, previously on loan at Gaz Metan Mediaș)
9	FW	(Romania) ROU	Albert Voinea (from Universitatea Cluj)
17	MF	(Jamaica) JAM	Jason Wright (Free agent)
18	MF	(Romania) ROU	Alin Șerban (loan return from Filiași)
21	FW	(Romania) ROU	Tiberiu Coman (from Argeș Pitești)
28	MF	(Romania) ROU	Alexandru Raicea (on loan from FC U Craiova)
33	FW	(Poland) POL	Paweł Tomczyk (from (Poland) Widzew Łódź)

Out:

No.	Pos.	Nation	Player
9	FW	(Italy) ITA	Davide Massaro (Free agent)
17	FW	(Romania) ROU	Andrei Cristea (Free agent)
21	MF	(Romania) ROU	Costin Ciucureanu (loan return to Concordia Chiajna, later on loan to Viitorul Ianca)

=== Rapid București ===
In:

No.	Pos.	Nation	Player
14	MF	(Estonia) EST	Mattias Käit (from (Norway) Bodø/Glimt)
19	DF	(Romania) ROU	Răzvan Onea (from Politehnica Iași)
21	DF	(Argentina) ARG	Matías Pérez (from (Argentina) Estudiantes)
71	FW	(Slovakia) SVK	Jakub Vojtuš (from (Hungary) Mezőkövesd)

Out:

No.	Pos.	Nation	Player
2	DF	(Greece) GRE	Anestis Nastos (Free agent)
3	DF	(Romania) ROU	Luca Florică (on loan to Academica Clinceni)
21	MF	(Romania) ROU	Bogdan Barbu (to Concordia Chiajna)

=== Sepsi Sfântu Gheorghe ===
In:

No.	Pos.	Nation	Player
9	FW	(Romania) ROU	Alexandru Tudorie (from (Russia) Arsenal Tula)
44	DF	(Romania) ROU	Mihai Bălașa (from Universitatea Craiova)

Out:

No.	Pos.	Nation	Player
22	FW	(Romania) ROU	Nándor Tamás (loan return to (Hungary) Puskás Akadémia, later on loan to (Hungary) Csákvár)
23	FW	(Bulgaria) BUL	Tsvetelin Chunchukov (on loan to Chindia Târgoviște)
30	MF	(Romania) ROU	Vlad Mitrea (to Mioveni)
55	FW	(Slovenia) SVN	Rajko Rep (to Austria Klagenfurt)
91	MF	(Serbia) SRB	Petar Bojić (on loan to (Serbia) Kolubara)
99	DF	(Romania) ROU	Balázs Csiszér (on loan to Miercurea Ciuc)

=== Universitatea Craiova ===
In:

No.	Pos.	Nation	Player
27	MF	(Romania) ROU	Ovidiu Bic (loan return from (Israel) Hapoel Ironi Kiryat Shmona)

Out:

No.	Pos.	Nation	Player
4	DF	(Romania) ROU	Mihai Bălașa (to Sepsi Sfântu Gheorghe)
7	FW	(Romania) ROU	Mihai Roman (to Botoșani)
12	GK	(Romania) ROU	Laurențiu Popescu (on loan to Brașov, previously on loan at Politehnica Iași)
21	MF	(Switzerland) SUI	Matteo Fedele (to (Malta) Ħamrun Spartans)
26	MF	(Bulgaria) BUL	Antoni Ivanov (on loan to Dinamo București)

=== UTA Arad ===
In:

No.	Pos.	Nation	Player
8	MF	(Romania) ROU	Florentin Matei (from (Greece) Apollon Smyrnis)
11	FW	(Lithuania) LTU	Karolis Laukžemis (from (Kazakhstan) Kaisar)
17	FW	(Nigeria) NGA	Philip Otele (from (Lithuania) Kauno Žalgiris)
26	FW	(Italy) ITA	Nicolao Dumitru (from (South Korea) Suwon Samsung Bluewings)
28	MF	(Romania) ROU	Fabiano Cibi (from LPS Banatul Timișoara)
70	FW	(Canada) CAN	Easton Ongaro (from (Canada) Edmonton)

Out:

No.	Pos.	Nation	Player
6	MF	(Argentina) ARG	Juan Pablo Passaglia (to Chindia Târgoviște)
7	MF	(Brazil) BRA	Roger (to CFR Cluj)
8	FW	(Romania) ROU	Liviu Antal (to (Hungary) Haladás)
8	DF	(Romania) ROU	Adrian Mar (on loan to Alexandria)
18	DF	(Romania) ROU	Florin Ilie (to Universitatea Cluj)
22	MF	(Romania) ROU	Cristian Bustea (to Steaua București)
25	FW	(Czech Republic) CZE	Tomáš Wágner (to (Czech Republic) Příbram)
26	DF	(Romania) ROU	Marius Tomozei (to Dinamo București)
88	FW	(Romania) ROU	Ioan Hora (to Hermannstadt)

=== Voluntari ===
In:

No.	Pos.	Nation	Player
13	DF	(Romania) ROU	Denis Ciobotariu (on loan from CFR Cluj)
27	FW	(Ivory Coast) CIV	Muhamed Olawale (on loan from (Italy) Parma)
50	MF	(Romania) ROU	Constantin Budescu (from FCSB)

Out:

No.	Pos.	Nation	Player
9	FW	(Romania) ROU	Daniel Paraschiv (loan return to CFR Cluj, later on loan to Hermannstadt)
19	FW	(North Macedonia) MKD	Viktor Angelov (to (North Macedonia) Akademija Pandev)
20	MF	(Romania) ROU	Neluț Roșu (to Concordia Chiajna)
