= Ismaël Kanda =

French professional footballer (born 2000)

Personal information
- Full name: Ismaël Enzo Kanda
- Date of birth: 8 November 2000 (age 26)
- Place of birth: Lille, France
- Height: 1.80 m (5 ft 11 in)
- Position: Right-back

Team information
- Current team: Olympic Charleroi
- Number: 19

Youth career
- 2016–2017: Lille

Senior career*
Years	Team	Apps	(Gls)
2017–2020	Lille II	15	(0)
2020–2021	Feignies Aulnoye	1	(0)
2021–2022	Gaz Metan Mediaș	12	(0)
2022–2023	Vitória	8	(0)
2023–	Olympic Charleroi	0	(0)
- * Club domestic league appearances and goals as of 25 August 2023

Ismaël Enzo Kanda (born 8 November 2000) is a French professional footballer who plays as a right-back for Belgian National Division 1 club Olympic Charleroi.

== Club career ==
=== Early career ===
Kanda started his career in 2016 in the academy of Lille.

=== Feignies Aulnoye ===
In 2020, Kanda joined Championnat National 3 club Feignies Aulnoye.

=== Gaz Metan Mediaș ===
On 9 February 2021, Kanda joined Liga I club Gaz Metan Mediaș. On 23 January 2022, he made his debut when he came on as a 75th-minute substitute in a 1–0 victory against UTA Arad in the Liga I, replacing the scorer of the only goal of the match Vlad Morar.

=== Vitória ===
In July 2022, Kanda joined Liga 3 club Vitória FC.

=== Olympic Charleroi ===
In August 2023, Kanda signed for Belgian National Division 1 side Olympic Charleroi.
