= Alexandru Răuță =

Romanian footballer

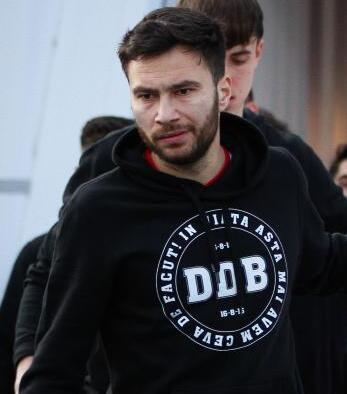
- Răuță în 2021

Personal information
- Full name: Alexandru Ilie Răuță
- Date of birth: 17 June 1992 (age 34)
- Place of birth: Pitești, Romania
- Height: 1.77 m (5 ft 10 in)
- Position: Defensive midfielder

Team information
- Current team: CSM Slatina
- Number: 5

Youth career
- –2010: Argeș Pitești

Senior career*
Years	Team	Apps	(Gls)
2010–2013	Argeș Pitești	69	(0)
2013–2015	Mioveni	59	(5)
2016	Pandurii Târgu Jiu	24	(0)
2017	Politehnica Iași	16	(1)
2017–2019	Voluntari	60	(0)
2019–2022	Dinamo București	78	(0)
2022–2023	Hermannstadt	16	(0)
2023	Ohod		
2023	Argeș Pitești	8	(0)
2024	Mioveni	0	(0)
2024	Ihud Bnei Shefa-'Amr	13	(0)
2024	Mioveni	10	(0)
2025–2026	AFC Câmpulung Muscel	20	(0)
2026	CS Dinamo București	8	(0)
2026–	CSM Slatina	6	(0)

International career
2014	Romania U19	1	(0)
- * Club domestic league appearances and goals as of 1 November 2026

Alexandru Ilie Răuță (born 17 June 1992) is a Romanian professional footballer who plays as a defensive midfielder for Liga II club CSM Slatina.

== Club career ==
Răuță joined Dinamo București in 2019. In 2022, he left Dinamo after the club relegated from the Liga I and signed a two-year contract with Hermannstadt. On 25 January 2023, Răuță joined Saudi Arabian club Ohod. On 29 July 2023, Răuță joined Argeș Pitești.

== Career statistics ==
As of match played 1 November 2026

Appearances and goals by club, season and competition
Club	Season	League			National cup (Note: Includes Cupa României)		Europe		Other		Total	
Club	Season	Division	Apps	Goals	Apps	Goals	Apps	Goals	Apps	Goals	Apps	Goals
Argeș Pitești	2009–10	Liga II	2	0	—		—		—		2	0
Argeș Pitești	2010–11	Liga II	25	0	0	0	—		—		25	0
Argeș Pitești	2011–12	Liga II	24	0	0	0	—		—		24	0
Argeș Pitești	2012–13	Liga II	18	0	0	0	—		—		18	0
Argeș Pitești	Total		69	0	0	0	—		—		69	0
Mioveni	2013–14	Liga II	27	0	0	0	—		—		27	0
Mioveni	2014–15	Liga II	24	4	3	0	—		—		27	4
Mioveni	2015–16	Liga II	8	1	1	0	—		—		9	1
Mioveni	Total		59	5	4	0	—		—		63	5
Pandurii Târgu Jiu	2015–16	Liga I	8	0	—		—		—		8	0
Pandurii Târgu Jiu	2016–17	Liga I	16	0	0	0	2 (Note: Appearances in UEFA Europa League)	0	1 (Note: Appearance in Cupa Ligii)	0	19	0
Pandurii Târgu Jiu	Total		24	0	0	0	2	0	1	0	27	0
Politehnica Iași	2016–17	Liga I	16	1	—		—		—		16	1
Voluntari	2017–18	Liga I	27	0	1	0	—		3 (Note: One appearance in the Supercupa României, two appearances and one goal in Liga I promotion/relegation play-offs)	0	31	0
Voluntari	2018–19	Liga I	33	0	2	0	—		—		35	0
Voluntari	Total		60	0	3	0	—		3	0	66	0
Dinamo București	2019–20	Liga I	25	0	3	0	—		—		28	0
Dinamo București	2020–21	Liga I	25	0	4	0	—		—		29	0
Dinamo București	2021–22	Liga I	28	0	1	0	—		1	0	30	0
Dinamo București	Total		78	0	8	0	—		1	0	87	0
Hermannstadt	2022–23	Liga I	16	0	3	0	—		—		19	0
Ohod	2022–23	Saudi First Division League	?	?	—		—		—		?	?
Argeș Pitești	2023–24	Liga II	8	0	0	0	—		—		8	0
Ihud Bnei Shefa-'Amr	2023–24	Liga Leumit	13	0	—		—		—		13	0
Mioveni	2024–25	Liga II	10	0	0	0	—		—		10	0
AFC Câmpulung Muscel	2024–25	Liga II	9	0	—		—		—		9	0
AFC Câmpulung Muscel	2025–26	Liga II	11	0	3	0	—		—		14	0
AFC Câmpulung Muscel	Total		20	0	3	0	—		—		23	0
CS Dinamo București	2025–26	Liga II	8	0	1	0	—		2 (Note: Appearances in Liga II relegation play-offs)	0	11	0
CSM Slatina	2026–27	Liga II	6	0	1	0	—		—		7	0
Career total			387	6	23	0	2	0	7	0	419	6

== Honours ==
Voluntari

- Supercupa României: 2017
