= Robert Moldoveanu =

Romanian footballer

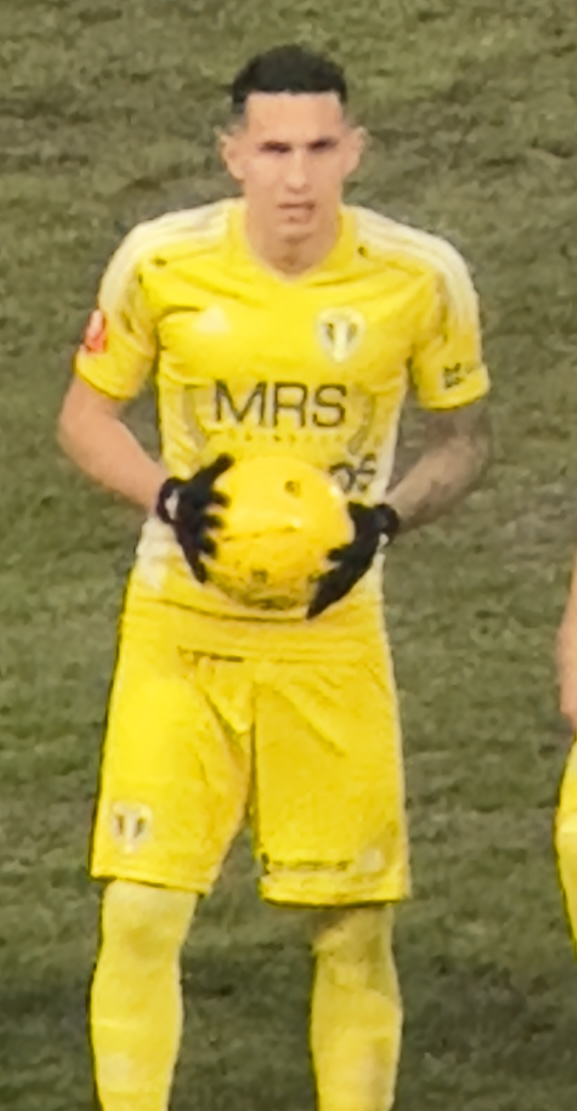
- Moldoveanu with Petrolul Ploiești in 2023

Personal information
- Full name: Robert Marian Moldoveanu
- Date of birth: 8 March 1999 (age 27)
- Place of birth: Bucharest, Romania
- Height: 1.79 m (5 ft 10 in)
- Position: Forward

Team information
- Current team: Argeș Pitești
- Number: 99

Youth career
- 2006–2015: Dinamo București

Senior career*
Years	Team	Apps	(Gls)
2015–2022	Dinamo București	80	(6)
2017	→ FC Brașov (loan)	6	(0)
2019	→ Petrolul Ploiești (loan)	17	(7)
2022	Farul Constanța	23	(3)
2023	Petrolul Ploiești	11	(0)
2023–2024	Chindia Târgoviște	24	(7)
2024–	Argeș Pitești	70	(15)

International career
2013–2014	Romania U15	4	(4)
2015	Romania U17	3	(0)
2017–2018	Romania U19	6	(2)
2018–2019	Romania U21	1	(0)
- * Club domestic league appearances and goals as of 6 November 2026

Robert Marian Moldoveanu (born 8 March 1999) is a Romanian professional footballer who plays as a forward for Liga I club Argeș Pitești.

== Club career ==
Robert Moldoveanu started his career at Dinamo București. He was raised by Dinamo and promoted to the first team by Flavius Stoican. In February 2017, Moldoveanu joined FC Brașov on loan. On 14 January 2019, Moldoveanu joined Petrolul Ploiești on loan.

On 13 January 2022, Farul Constanța announced the signing of Moldoveanu. On 26 December 2022, Moldoveanu was released from the club after having his contract mutually terminated.

On 4 January 2023, Petrolul Ploiești announced the re-signing of Moldoveanu on a one-and-a-half-year contract.

== Career statistics ==
As of match played 6 November 2026

Appearances and goals by club, season and competition
Club	Season	League			Cupa României		Europe		Other		Total	
Club	Season	Division	Apps	Goals	Apps	Goals	Apps	Goals	Apps	Goals	Apps	Goals
Dinamo București	2015–16	Liga I	2	0	1	0	—		0	0	3	0
Dinamo București	2017–18	Liga I	14	3	0	0	—		—		14	3
Dinamo București	2018–19	Liga I	15	1	1	0	—		—		16	1
Dinamo București	2019–20	Liga I	28	2	4	2	—		—		32	4
Dinamo București	2020–21	Liga I	10	0	0	0	—		—		10	0
Dinamo București	2021–22	Liga I	11	0	2	0	—		—		13	0
Dinamo București	Total		80	6	8	2	—		0	0	88	8
FC Brașov (loan)	2016–17	Liga II	6	0	—		—		—		6	0
Petrolul Ploiești (loan)	2018–19	Liga II	17	7	—		—		—		17	7
Farul Constanța	2021–22	Liga I	16	2	—		—		—		16	2
Farul Constanța	2022–23	Liga I	7	1	3	0	—		—		10	1
Farul Constanța	Total		23	3	3	0	—		—		26	3
Petrolul Ploiești	2022–23	Liga I	11	0	—		—		—		11	0
Chindia Târgoviște	2023–24	Liga II	24	7	2	0	—		—		26	7
Argeș Pitești	2024–25	Liga II	27	8	4	0	—		—		31	8
Argeș Pitești	2025–26	Liga I	33	4	5	3	—		—		38	7
Argeș Pitești	2026–27	Liga I	10	3	0	0	—		—		10	3
Argeș Pitești	Total		70	15	9	3	—		—		79	18
Career total			231	38	22	5	0	0	0	0	253	43

== Honours ==
Argeș Pitești

- Liga II: 2024–25
