= Mioveni =

- Town
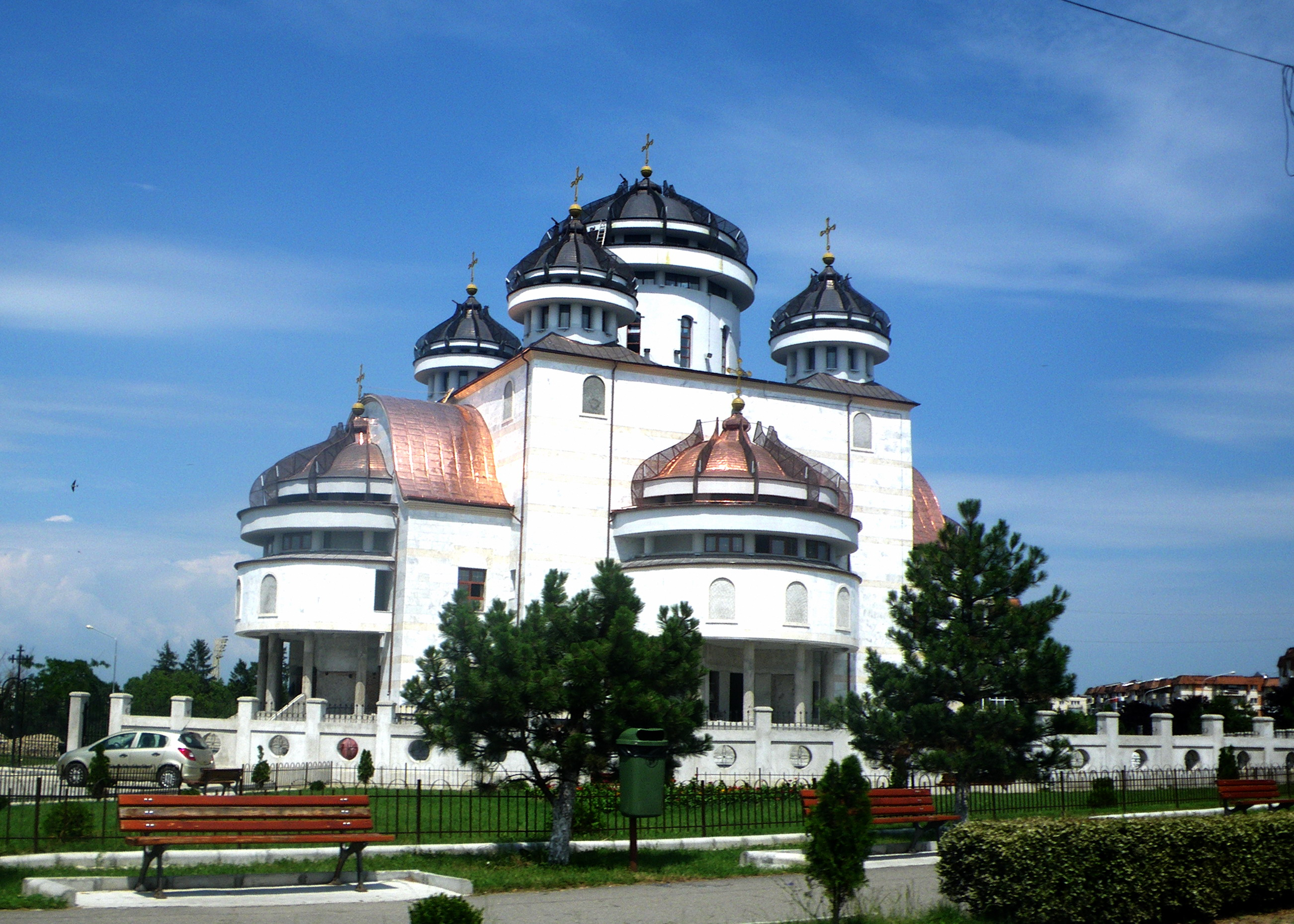
- Mioveni Orthodox Church

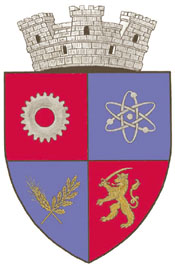
- Coat of arms

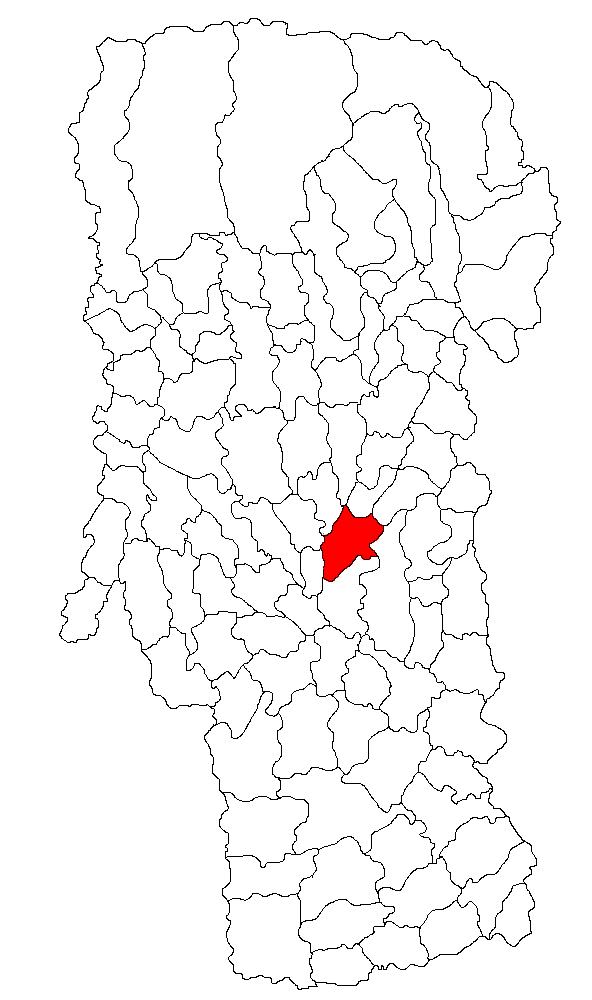
- Location in Argeș County

- Location in Romania
- Coordinates: 44°57′25″N 24°56′26″E
- Country: Romania
- County: Argeș

Government
  - Mayor (2024–2028): Aurel Costache (PSD)
- Area: 50.79 km^{2} (19.61 sq mi)
- Elevation: 417 m (1,368 ft)
- Population (2021-12-01): 29,317
  - Density: 577.2/km^{2} (1,495/sq mi)
- Time zone: UTC+02:00 (EET)
  - Summer (DST): UTC+03:00 (EEST)
- Postal code: 115400
- Area code: (+40) 02 48
- Vehicle reg.: AG
- Website: emioveni.ro

Mioveni (Romanian pronunciation: [mi.oˈvenʲ]) is a town in Argeș County, Romania, approximately 15 km (9.3 mi) north-east of Pitești. As of 2021, it had a population of 29,317. The town administers four villages: Clucereasa, Colibași, Făgetu, and Racovița.

== History ==
Mioveni was first mentioned in a written record in 1485. It developed much in the 1970s after the construction of the Automobile Dacia manufacturing plant, inaugurated in 1968. There is also a Nuclear Research Institute, that builds components and materials for the Cernavodă Nuclear Power Plant, and a high security prison.

It officially became a town in 1989, as a result of the Romanian rural systematization program. Prior to April 1989, when it was declared a town, the place was a commune under the name of Colibași. In 1996, the historic name of Mioveni was revived, although the old village had been completely razed under the Communist regime in order to make way for new urban construction.

== Economy ==
Automobile Dacia is headquartered in the town. The company's single plant here has a production capacity of 350,000 vehicles per year.

== Sports ==
Its football team, CS Mioveni (formerly Dacia Mioveni) has played four seasons in the Romanian first league: in 2007–08, 2011–12, 2021–22 and 2022–23. They also reached the semifinals of the 2007–08 Romanian Cup.

Stadionul Orășenesc (which opened in 2000) is the home ground for the Mioveni team.

Historical population
Year	Pop.	±%
1992	33,897	—
2002	35,801	+5.6%
2011	31,998	−10.6%
2021	29,317	−8.4%
Source: Census data

== Natives ==
- Alexandru Ișfan (born 2000), footballer
- Andrei Panait (born 1989), footballer

== Twin cities ==
- Kiskunlacháza – Hungary
- Nagyvázsony – Hungary
- Petrich – Bulgaria
- Probištip – North Macedonia

Planned partner city relations:

- Tököl – Hungary
- Kaunas – Lithuania
