= Marco Ehmann =

Romanian footballer

Personal information
- Date of birth: 3 August 2000 (age 26)
- Place of birth: Spaichingen, Germany
- Height: 1.89 m (6 ft 2 in)
- Position: Centre-back

Team information
- Current team: Villingen
- Number: 24

Youth career
- 2010–2012: Reutlingen 05
- 2012–2015: SC Freiburg
- 2015–2017: Borussia Dortmund
- 2017–2018: Karlsruher SC
- 2018: Dinamo București

Senior career*
Years	Team	Apps	(Gls)
2018–2022	Dinamo București	39	(0)
2019	→ Farul Constanța (loan)	14	(0)
2019	→ CSM Reșița (loan)	17	(2)
2022–2023	Enosis Neon Paralimni	25	(1)
2023–2025	Stal Mielec	19	(0)
2026–	Villingen	0	(0)

International career
2016	Germany U16	1	(0)
2018	Romania U18	3	(0)
2018–2019	Romania U19	4	(0)
- * Club domestic league appearances and goals as of 14:02, 27 May 2025 (UTC)

Marco Ehmann (born 3 August 2000) is a professional footballer who plays as a centre-back or Oberliga Baden-Württemberg club Villingen. Born in Germany, he represented both his country of birth and Romania at youth level.

== Career ==
Ehmann made his Liga I debut for Dinamo București in a match against FC Voluntari, on 2 August 2020.

On 26 June 2023, Ehmann signed for Ekstraklasa club Stal Mielec on a two-year deal with the option for a further year. On 27 June 2024, it was announced he suffered an ACL tear during Stal's pre-season camp, and would be ruled out of play for approximately six to eight months.

== Career statistics ==
As of match played 25 May 2024

Appearances and goals by club, season and competition
Club	Season	League			National cup (Note: Includes Cupa României, Cypriot Cup, Polish Cup)		Europe		Other		Total	
Club	Season	Division	Apps	Goals	Apps	Goals	Apps	Goals	Apps	Goals	Apps	Goals
Farul Constanța (loan)	2018–19	Liga II	14	0	—		—		—		14	0
CSM Reșița (loan)	2019–20	Liga II	17	2	1	0	—		—		18	2
Dinamo București	2019–20	Liga I	2	0	0	0	—		—		2	0
Dinamo București	2020–21	Liga I	17	0	1	0	—		—		18	0
Dinamo București	2021–22	Liga I	20	0	1	0	—		0	0	18	0
Dinamo București	Total		39	0	2	0	—		0	0	41	0
Enosis Neon Paralimni	2022–23	Cypriot First Division	25	1	1	0	—		—		26	1
Stal Mielec	2023–24	Ekstraklasa	19	0	2	0	—		—		21	0
Stal Mielec	2024–25	Ekstraklasa	0	0	0	0	—		—		0	0
Stal Mielec	Total		19	2	2	0	—		—		21	0
Villingen	2025–26	Oberliga Baden-Württemberg	0	0	—		—		—		0	0
Career total			114	3	6	0	0	0	0	0	120	3
