= Andrei Panait =

Romanian footballer

Personal information
- Full name: Mihai Andrei Panait
- Date of birth: 16 May 1989 (age 37)
- Place of birth: Mioveni, Romania
- Height: 1.77 m (5 ft 10 in)
- Position: Midfielder

Youth career
- –2007: Argeș Pitești

Senior career*
Years	Team	Apps	(Gls)
2007–2011	Argeș Pitești	11	(0)
2009–2010	→ Dacia Mioveni (loan)	2	(0)
2011–2012	FC Dănuț Coman	6	(3)
2012–2014	Mioveni	9	(1)
2014	→ SCM Pitești (loan)		
2014–2015	Muscelul Câmpulung		
2015–2020	Argeș Pitești	83	(4)
2021–2023	Mioveni	61	(1)
2023	Argeș Pitești	9	(0)
2024	Mioveni	18	(1)
2025	Chindia Târgoviște	4	(0)
- * Club domestic league appearances and goals as of 29 March 2025

Mihai Andrei Panait (born 16 May 1989) is a Romanian professional footballer who plays as a midfielder.

În prezent acesta este fără club din 15 aprilie

== Honours ==
Argeș Pitești

- Liga II: 2007–08

SCM Pitești

- Liga III: 2016–17
