= João Miguel Xavier =

Portuguese footballer

João Miguel
Personal information
- Full name: João Miguel Xavier Ferreira dos Santos
- Date of birth: 14 September 1993 (age 33)
- Place of birth: Maia, Portugal
- Height: 1.90 m (6 ft 3 in)
- Position: Centre-back

Team information
- Current team: Penafiel
- Number: 4

Youth career
- Salgueiros

Senior career*
Years	Team	Apps	(Gls)
2014–2017	Salgueiros	77	(6)
2017	Anadia	9	(0)
2018	Cesarense	14	(0)
2018–2019	Leiria	30	(1)
2019–2021	Mafra	49	(0)
2021–2022	Argeș Pitești	28	(1)
2022–	Penafiel	115	(0)
- * Club domestic league appearances and goals as of 20 June 2026

João Miguel Xavier Ferreira dos Santos (born 14 September 1993), commonly known as João Miguel, is a Portuguese professional footballer who plays as a centre-back for Liga Portugal 2 club Penafiel.

== Club career ==
Miguel signed for Romanian club Argeș Pitești in 2022. In his career, João Miguel also played for teams such as S.C. Salgueiros, U.D. Leiria or C.D. Mafra.
