= Alin Dudea =

Romanian professional footballer

Personal information
- Full name: Alin Ilie Dudea
- Date of birth: 6 June 1997 (age 29)
- Place of birth: Craiova, Romania
- Height: 1.79 m (5 ft 10 1/2 in)
- Positions: Defender; defensive midfielder

Team information
- Current team: CSM Reșița
- Number: 5

Youth career
- –2013: FC U Craiova
- 2013–2014: Universitatea Craiova
- 2014–2016: Dinamo București

Senior career*
Years	Team	Apps	(Gls)
2016–2023	Dinamo București	33	(0)
2016	→ Rapid CFR Suceava (loan)	9	(0)
2018–2020	→ Chindia Târgoviște (loan)	24	(2)
2020–2021	→ CSM Reșița (loan)	16	(1)
2022	→ CSM Reșița (loan)	10	(0)
2023–	CSM Reșița	67	(6)

International career
2015–2016	Romania U19	8	(0)
- * Club domestic league appearances and goals as of 28 February 2026

Alin Ilie Dudea (born 6 June 1997) is a Romanian professional footballer who plays as a defender or a defensive midfielder for Liga II club CSM Reșița, which he captains.

== Career statistics ==
As of match played 28 February 2026

Appearances and goals by club, season and competition
Club	Season	League			Cupa României		Europe		Other		Total	
Club	Season	Division	Apps	Goals	Apps	Goals	Apps	Goals	Apps	Goals	Apps	Goals
Rapid CFR Suceava (loan)	2015–16	Liga II	9	0	—		—		—		9	0
Dinamo București	2016–17	Liga I	4	0	0	0	0	0	2 (Note: Appearances in Cupa Ligii)	0	6	0
Dinamo București	2017–18	Liga I	17	0	2	0	0	0	—		19	0
Dinamo București	2021–22	Liga I	3	0	1	0	—		—		4	0
Dinamo București	2019–20	Liga II	9	0	2	0	—		—		11	0
Dinamo București	Total		33	0	5	0	0	0	2	0	40	0
Chindia Târgoviște (loan)	2018–19	Liga II	19	2	1	0	—		—		20	2
Chindia Târgoviște (loan)	2019–20	Liga I	5	0	1	0	—		—		6	0
Chindia Târgoviște (loan)	Total		24	2	2	0	—		—		26	2
CSM Reșița (loan)	2019–20	Liga II	2	0	—		—		—		2	0
CSM Reșița (loan)	2020–21	Liga II	14	1	—		—		—		14	1
CSM Reșița (loan)	2021–22	Liga III	10	0	—		—		3 (Note: Appearances in Liga III promotion play-offs)	0	13	0
CSM Reșița	2022–23	Liga III	9	0	—		—		2	0	11	0
CSM Reșița	2023–24	Liga II	20	2	0	0	—		—		20	2
CSM Reșița	2024–25	Liga II	21	3	4	0	—		—		25	3
CSM Reșița	2025–26	Liga II	17	1	0	0	—		—		17	1
CSM Reșița	2026–27	Liga II	0	0	0	0	—		—		0	0
CSM Reșița	Total		93	7	4	0	—		5	0	102	7
Career total			159	9	11	0	0	0	7	0	177	9

== Honours ==
Dinamo București

- Cupa Ligii: 2016–17

Chindia Târgoviște

- Liga II: 2018–19

CSM Reșița

- Liga III: 2021–22, 2022–23
