= Gabriel Moura =

Brazilian footballer (born 1988)

Personal information
- Full name: Gabriel Rodrigues de Moura
- Date of birth: 18 June 1988 (age 38)
- Place of birth: Divinópolis, Brazil
- Height: 1.76 m (5 ft 9 1/2 in)
- Position: Right back

Youth career
- 2006–2010: América Mineiro

Senior career*
Years	Team	Apps	(Gls)
2011	América Mineiro	0	(0)
2011–2012	→ Coríntians (loan)	20	(2)
2011	Guarany de Sobral	16	(0)
2011–2012	Mirandela	24	(0)
2012–2013	Penafiel	39	(2)
2013–2015	Gil Vicente	59	(0)
2015–2017	Anorthosis	64	(1)
2017–2018	Gil Vicente	19	(0)
2018–2019	Sepsi OSK	34	(0)
2019–2020	Dinamo București	12	(0)
2020–2022	Gaz Metan Mediaș	54	(0)
2022–2024	Dinamo București	71	(1)
2025	Pouso Alegre	3	(0)
2025	Guarani	0	(0)
2025–2026	Vianense	6	(0)
- * Club domestic league appearances and goals as of 31 May 2026

Gabriel Rodrigues de Moura (born 18 June 1988), known as Gabriel Moura or just Gabriel, is a Brazilian professional footballer who plays as a right-back.

== Club career ==
=== Early career ===
Born in Divinópolis, Minas Gerais, Gabriel began his career with local side América Mineiro. He was loaned to Coríntians for the 2010 Campeonato Potiguar, and reached the finals of the competition with the side.

Gabriel moved to Guarany de Sobral ahead of the 2011 season, before moving abroad with Portuguese side Mirandela in July of that year. He signed for Segunda Liga side Penafiel in 2012, and was a regular starter with the side.

=== Gil Vicente ===
On 27 May 2013, Gabriel joined Primeira Liga side Gil Vicente. He made his debut in the Portuguese top tier on 18 August, starting in a 2–0 home win over Académica de Coimbra.

=== Anorthosis ===
On 22 July 2015, after Gil Vicente's relegation, Gabriel was announced at Cypriot side Anorthosis Famagusta on a two-year contract. He was a regular starter with the side, and scored his first goal on 5 February 2017, netting the opener in a 3–0 home win over Anagennisi Deryneia.

=== Gil Vicente return ===
On 9 November 2017, Gabriel returned to Portugal and Gil Vicente, with the club now in the second division. He contributed with 19 appearances as the club suffered another relegation.

=== Sepsi OSK Sfântu Gheorghe ===
Moura arrived in Romania in 2018, when he signed a contract with Sepsi OSK.

=== Dinamo București ===
On 26 June 2019, he moved to Dinamo București, following his manager from Sepsi OSK, Eugen Neagoe. He made his debut for the team on 15 July 2019, playing for 90 minutes in a 5–0 loss against Viitorul Constanţa. After Eugen Neagoe was sacked and replaced by Dušan Uhrin Jr., he lost his place in the first squad. Moura featured sparingly in the 2019-2020 first part of the season, often being played outside his favorite position, as a left back or even as a left winger. From this position, he produced his first assist for the club, for a goal scored by Ricardo Grigore in a 4–1 win against Chindia Târgoviște.

=== Gaz Metan Mediaș ===
After only six months, Moura left Dinamo on 25 January 2020 and reached an agreement with another Romanian club, Gaz Metan Mediaș.

=== Dinamo București ===
Following major financial problems at Gaz Metan Mediaș, he returned to Dinamo București on 14 February 2022. He played regularly as a right back in an underachieving Dinamo București team, under both Flavius Stoican and Dušan Uhrin Jr. Playing as a left back, on 1 April 2022, Moura produced an assist for Vlad Morar in a 2–0 win against Chindia Târgoviște. He made 10 appearances for Dinamo București in Liga I in the 2021–2022 season. He also played for 90 minutes in the first leg of the play-out game against Universitatea Cluj, which Dinamo București lost and relegated for the first time in history.

For the 2022–2023, Moura was one of the few experienced players who stayed at the club to play in the Liga II, playing regularly under manager Ovidiu Burcă. On 16 August 2022, he assisted Vasile Buhăescu in a 3–1 loss against Oțelul Galați. He was an integral part of the team who reached the play-offs and won promotion back to Liga I. He played in every game of the season, including the two play-off promotion games against Argeş Piteşti. He played a total of 2738 minutes from the 2790 minutes of the season.

In the 2023–2024, Gabriel remained at the club in Liga I. He continued playing regularly, alternating between the positions of right back and left back in a system with four defenders.
