= Martin Remacle =

Belgian footballer

Personal information
- Full name: Martin Christophe Jannick Remacle
- Date of birth: 16 May 1997 (age 29)
- Place of birth: Verviers, Belgium
- Height: 1.76 m (5 ft 9 in)
- Position: Midfielder

Team information
- Current team: Korona Kielce
- Number: 8

Youth career
- –2016: Standard Liège
- 2017: Torino

Senior career*
Years	Team	Apps	(Gls)
2016–2017	Standard Liège	3	(0)
2017	Torino	0	(0)
2018–2019	Enosis Neon Paralimni	0	(0)
2018–2019	→ Ayia Napa (loan)	26	(2)
2020	URSL Visé	3	(0)
2020	Pandurii Târgu Jiu	13	(4)
2021	Voluntari	6	(0)
2021–2023	Botoșani	2	(0)
2022–2023	→ Universitatea Cluj (loan)	35	(5)
2023–	Korona Kielce	94	(10)

International career
2014	Belgium U17	2	(0)
2015	Belgium U18	3	(1)
2015	Belgium U19	6	(1)
- * Club domestic league appearances and goals as of 21:11, 29 May 2026 (UTC)

Martin Christophe Jannick Remacle (born 16 May 1997) is a Belgian professional footballer who plays as a midfielder for Polish Ekstraklasa club Korona Kielce.

== Club career ==
Remacle is a youth exponent from Standard Liège. On 10 April 2016, he made his Belgian Pro League debut against K.V. Kortrijk.

On 30 January 2017, Italian club Torino announced they had signed Remacle. On 5 March 2017, he was included in Torino's first-team squad for the first time, when he was an unused substitute in a game against Palermo.

== Honours ==
Standard Liège

- Belgian Cup: 2015–16

Universitatea Cluj

- Cupa României runner-up: 2022–23

Individual

- Polish Cup top scorer: 2023–24
