= Alin Buleică =

Romanian footballer

Personal information
- Full name: Alin Florian Buleică
- Date of birth: 12 September 1991 (age 35)
- Place of birth: Craiova, Romania
- Height: 1.75 m (5 ft 9 in)
- Position: Right winger

Youth career
- 2004–2008: Universitatea Craiova

Senior career*
Years	Team	Apps	(Gls)
2008–2011	Universitatea Craiova	12	(0)
2008–2009	→ Gaz Metan CFR Craiova (loan)	28	(0)
2011	Kavala	0	(0)
2011–2012	Petrolul Ploieşti	4	(0)
2012	Turnu Severin	14	(0)
2013–2016	Pandurii Târgu Jiu	54	(4)
2013	→ Universitatea Cluj (loan)	14	(4)
2015–2016	→ Concordia Chiajna (loan)	2	(0)
2016–2017	Concordia Chiajna	14	(0)
2017	UTA Arad	11	(0)
2018–2019	Argeș Pitești	27	(1)
2019–2020	Turris Turnu Măgurele	27	(0)
2021	Viitorul Târgu Jiu	20	(0)
2022–2023	Dinamo București	14	(0)
Total		241	(9)

International career
2011	Romania U21	3	(0)
- * Club domestic league appearances and goals

Alin Florian Buleică (born 12 September 1991) is a Romanian former footballer who played as a midfielder.

== Career ==
One of the highlights of his career happened while playing for Pandurii, during the 2013-2014 Europa League, when his goal contributed decisively to Pandurii defeating Braga and qualifying for the group stage that year.

== Honours ==
Gaz Metan CFR Craiova

- Liga III: 2008–09
