= Petar Gluhakovic =

Austrian footballer

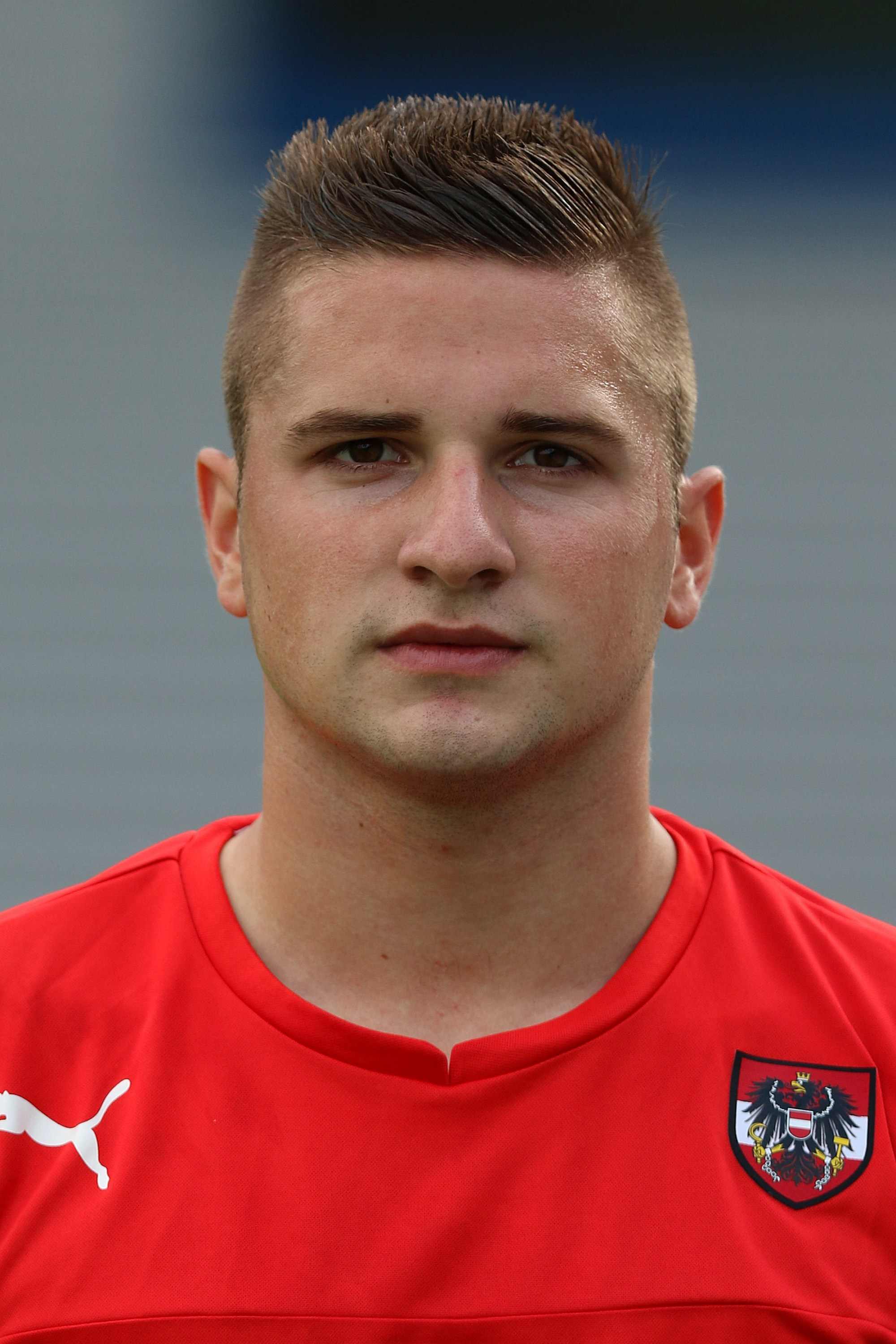

Personal information
- Full name: Petar Gluhakovic
- Date of birth: 25 March 1996 (age 30)
- Place of birth: Vienna, Austria
- Height: 1.70 m (5 ft 7 in)
- Position: Right back

Youth career
- 2002–2010: First Vienna
- 2010–2013: Austria Wien

Senior career*
Years	Team	Apps	(Gls)
2013–2019	Austria Wien II	105	(1)
2014–2019	Austria Wien	11	(0)
2014	→ SKN St. Pölten (loan)	5	(0)
2019–2021	Lokomotiva	10	(0)
2021	Dinamo București	2	(0)
2022-	Stripfing	0	(0)

International career
2012–2013	Austria U17	23	(0)
2014	Austria U18	1	(0)
2014–2015	Austria U19	9	(0)
2017–2019	Austria U21	14	(0)
- * Club domestic league appearances and goals as of 13 December 2021

Petar Gluhakovic (Croatian: Gluhaković; born 25 March 1996) is an Austrian footballer who plays as a right back.

== International career ==
Gluhakovic was born in Austria and is of Croatian descent. He is a youth international for Austria.
