= Davide Massaro =

Italian footballer (born 1998)

Personal information
- Date of birth: 10 February 1998 (age 28)
- Place of birth: Bassano del Grappa, Italy
- Height: 1.80 m (5 ft 11 in)
- Position: Forward

Youth career
- –2014: Vicenza
- 2014–2016: Juventus
- 2014–2016: → Vicenza (loan)

Senior career*
Years	Team	Apps	(Gls)
2016–2017	Juventus	0	(0)
2016–2017	→ Carrarese (loan)	5	(0)
2017	Ascona	8	(1)
2018–2019	Tre Fiori	24	(12)
2019–2022	Mioveni	47	(7)
2022	Academica Clinceni	3	(1)
2023	Unirea Constanța	9	(4)
2023–2024	Mioveni	22	(2)
2026	Dumbrăvița	2	(0)
- * Club domestic league appearances and goals as of 18 April 2026

Davide Massaro (born 10 February 1998) is an Italian professional footballer who plays as a forward.

== Club career ==
Born in Bassano del Grappa, a town in the Province of Vicenza, Veneto region, Massaro started his career at Vicenza Calcio. On 30 January 2015, Massaro was signed by Serie A club Juventus for a €630,000 transfer fee. Massaro signed a 2 1/2-year contract. However, the Old Lady also loaned Massaro back to Vicenza for their youth and reserve teams until 30 June 2016. Vicenza even had an option to buy back Massaro. Massaro scored against Juventus in the second half of 2014–15 season, for Vicenza's under-17 team.

On 26 August 2016 Massaro and Juventus team-mate Nazzareno Belfasti were signed by Lega Pro club Carrarese. Massaro was assigned number 24 shirt of the first team. He started playing first for their reserves. However, on 17 December 2016, Massaro made his professional debut against Lupa Roma, substituting Roberto Floriano in the 85th minute.

After a season spent at SP Tre Fiori, Massaro signed in the summer of 2019 a contract with Romanian Liga II side CS Mioveni.

== Honours ==
Tre Fiori

- Coppa Titano: 2018–19
