= Dušan Čelar =

Serbian footballer

Personal information
- Date of birth: 20 February 1996 (age 30)
- Place of birth: Belgrade, Serbia
- Height: 1.92 m (6 ft 4 in)
- Position: Forward

Team information
- Current team: FK Podunavac Belegiš

Youth career
- –2013: Zemun
- 2013–2014: Brodarac

Senior career*
Years	Team	Apps	(Gls)
2014–2015	Železničar		
2015–2017	IMT		
2017	Jedinstvo		
2017–2018	Stepojevac		
2018	Radnički		
2018–2019	BASK		
2019–2020	Zemun	18	(2)
2020–2021	Sinđelić		
2021	Smederevo		
2021–2022	CFR II Cluj	8	(4)
2022	→ Dinamo București (loan)	2	(0)
2022	Krupa	11	(2)
2023	Sinđelić		
2023-	Podunavac Belegiš		(3)
- * Club domestic league appearances and goals as of 19 May 2024

Dušan Čelar (born 20 February 1996) is a Serbian footballer who plays as a forward for FK Podunavac Belegiš.
