= Juan Pablo Passaglia =

Argentine footballer

Personal information
- Full name: Juan Pablo Passaglia
- Date of birth: 24 May 1989 (age 37)
- Place of birth: Rosario, Argentina
- Height: 1.81 m (5 ft 11 in)
- Position: Midfielder

Youth career
- –2007: River Plate
- 2007–2009: Villarreal
- 2010: Racing Club

Senior career*
Years	Team	Apps	(Gls)
2010–2011	San Martín SJ	12	(0)
2011–2012	Defensores Belgrano VR	31	(3)
2012–2013	Universidad de Chile	2	(0)
2012	→ Deportes La Serena (loan)	13	(0)
2013	→ Barnechea (loan)	10	(0)
2013–2014	Douglas Haig	24	(0)
2014–2015	Defensores Belgrano VR	14	(2)
2015–2016	Juventud Unida Universitario	56	(3)
2016–2017	Chaco For Ever	25	(4)
2017–2018	Talleres RdE	31	(1)
2018–2019	Barracas Central	36	(2)
2019–2021	Politehnica Iași	69	(9)
2021	UTA Arad	18	(0)
2022	Chindia Târgoviște	32	(1)
2023	Agropecuario	33	(1)
2024	Chacarita Juniors	11	(0)
2024–2025	All Boys	49	(6)
Total		466	(32)
- * Club domestic league appearances and goals

Juan Pablo Passaglia (born 24 May 1989) is an Argentine former professional footballer who played as a midfielder.

== Career ==
In March 2026, Passaglia announced his retirement. His last club was All Boys in the Primera Nacional.

== Honours ==
Juventud Unida Universitario

- Torneo Federal A: 2015

Barracas Central

- Primera B Metropolitana: 2018–19
