= Răzvan Trif =

Romanian footballer

Personal information
- Full name: Răzvan Alin Trif
- Date of birth: 9 October 1997 (age 29)
- Place of birth: Jidvei, Romania
- Height: 1.80 m (5 ft 11 in)
- Position: Left back

Team information
- Current team: FK Csíkszereda
- Number: 29

Youth career
- –2015: Gaz Metan Mediaș

Senior career*
Years	Team	Apps	(Gls)
2015–2022	Gaz Metan Mediaș	85	(3)
2017–2018	→ Luceafărul Oradea (loan)	27	(1)
2022–2023	Mioveni	25	(0)
2023	Universitatea Cluj	0	(0)
2023	ACS Mediaș	11	(4)
2024–2025	UTA Arad	42	(0)
2025	Oțelul Galați	4	(0)
2026–	FK Csíkszereda	24	(1)
- * Club domestic league appearances and goals as of 7 November 2026

Răzvan Alin Trif (born 9 October 1997) is a Romanian professional footballer who plays as a left back for Liga I club FK Csíkszereda.

== Career ==
In June 2025, Trif joined Liga I club Oțelul Galați on a one-year deal with the option to extend for a further season.

== Honours ==
Gaz Metan Mediaș

- Liga II: 2015–16

Universitatea Cluj

- Cupa României runner-up: 2022–23
