= Alexandru Raicea =

Romanian professional footballer

Personal information
- Full name: Alexandru Nicușor Raicea
- Date of birth: 17 December 1996 (age 29)
- Place of birth: Craiova, Romania
- Height: 1.67 m (5 ft 6 in)
- Position: Midfielder

Senior career*
| Years | Team | Apps | (Gls) |
| 2015–2017 | CS Podari | 18 | (4) |
| 2017–2023 | FC U Craiova | 70 | (17) |
| 2022 | → Mioveni (loan) | 11 | (1) |
| 2022 | → 1599 Șelimbăr (loan) | 11 | (1) |
| 2023 | → Viitorul Târgu Jiu (loan) | 7 | (0) |
| 2023–2024 | Unirea Alba Iulia | 19 | (3) |
| 2024–2025 | FC U Craiova | 10 | (0) |
- * Club domestic league appearances and goals as of 10 May 2025

Alexandru Nicușor Raicea (born 17 December 1996) is a Romanian professional footballer who plays as a midfielder for Liga II club FC U Craiova.

== Honours ==
FC U Craiova

- Liga II: 2020–21
- Liga III: 2019–20
- Liga IV: 2017–18
