= Marko Nunić =

Slovenian footballer (born 1993)

Personal information
- Date of birth: 16 March 1993 (age 33)
- Place of birth: Ljubljana, Slovenia
- Height: 1.88 m (6 ft 2 in)
- Position: Striker

Team information
- Current team: Dolomiti Bellunesi

Youth career
- 2009–2012: Olimpija Ljubljana

Senior career*
| Years | Team | Apps | (Gls) |
| 2010–2013 | Olimpija Ljubljana | 9 | (0) |
| 2013 | → Radomlje (loan) | 9 | (1) |
| 2013–2014 | Šenčur | 24 | (16) |
| 2014–2015 | Aluminij | 26 | (17) |
| 2015 | Zavrč | 0 | (0) |
| 2015–2016 | Gorica | 27 | (5) |
| 2016–2017 | Radomlje | 34 | (6) |
| 2017–2018 | Aluminij | 33 | (4) |
| 2018–2021 | AEL | 55 | (10) |
| 2021–2022 | Dinamo București | 5 | (0) |
| 2022 | PAEEK | 10 | (0) |
| 2022–2023 | Primorje | 25 | (9) |
| 2023– | Dolomiti Bellunesi | | |
- * Club domestic league appearances and goals

Marko Nunić (born 16 March 1993) is a Slovenian professional footballer who plays as a striker for Serie D club Dolomiti Bellunesi.

== Career ==
In 2018, Nunić joined Greek side AEL. On 14 May 2021, there was an official announcement that his contract was terminated by mutual agreement.

In October 2021, Nunić signed a contract with Romanian club Dinamo București. He was released from Dinamo on 31 January 2022, after five games played in Liga I, without scoring a goal. The next day, he signed a contract with Cypriot First Division club PAEEK.

On 21 August 2023, Nunić joined Serie D side Dolomiti Bellunesi on a free transfer, signing a one-year contract with the Italian club.
