= Marius Tomozei =

Romanian footballer

Personal information
- Full name: Marius Ionuț Tomozei
- Date of birth: 9 September 1990 (age 36)
- Place of birth: Bucharest, Romania
- Height: 1.77 m (5 ft 10 in)
- Position: Right-back

Team information
- Current team: ARO Câmpulung (assistant)

Youth career
- –2008: CS Buftea

Senior career*
Years	Team	Apps	(Gls)
2008–2009	CS Buftea	25	(0)
2009–2010	FC Snagov	1	(0)
2011–2013	CSM Râmnicu Vâlcea	50	(1)
2012	→ FC Snagov (loan)	3	(0)
2013	Metalul Reșița	9	(0)
2014	ASA Târgu Mureș	5	(1)
2014	Costuleni	9	(0)
2015	FC Caransebeș	10	(1)
2015–2016	CSM Râmnicu Vâlcea	15	(2)
2016	Botoșani	2	(0)
2016–2017	Mioveni	12	(0)
2017	Luceafărul Oradea	0	(0)
2017–2018	Dunărea Călărași	21	(0)
2018	Energeticianul	10	(1)
2019	Metaloglobus București	15	(0)
2019–2022	UTA Arad	50	(1)
2022–2023	Dinamo București	3	(0)
2023–2024	Mioveni	4	(0)
Total		244	(7)

Managerial career
- 2024–: ARO Câmpulung (assistant)
- * Club domestic league appearances and goals

Marius Tomozei (born 9 September 1990) is a Romanian former professional footballer who played as a right-back for teams such as CSM Râmnicu Vâlcea, Dunărea Călărași, Metaloglobus București or UTA Arad, among others.

== Honours ==
Dunărea Călărași

- Liga II: 2017–18

UTA Arad

- Liga II: 2019–20
