= Cristiano (footballer, born 1990) =

German-born Portuguese footballer

Personal information
- Full name: Cristiano Pereira Figueiredo
- Date of birth: 29 November 1990 (age 35)
- Place of birth: Munich, Germany
- Height: 1.92 m (6 ft 4 in)
- Position: Goalkeeper

Team information
- Current team: Paços Ferreira
- Number: 31

Youth career
- 2004−2006: Académico Viseu
- 2006−2007: Académica
- 2007−2008: Penalva
- 2008−2009: Braga

Senior career*
| Years | Team | Apps | (Gls) |
| 2008 | Penalva | 2 | (0) |
| 2009−2011 | Braga | 0 | (0) |
| 2010−2011 | → Vizela (loan) | 15 | (0) |
| 2011−2012 | Valencia B | 5 | (0) |
| 2012−2014 | Braga B | 44 | (0) |
| 2013−2016 | Braga | 3 | (0) |
| 2014−2015 | → Académica (loan) | 26 | (0) |
| 2016−2017 | Panetolikos | 1 | (0) |
| 2017 | Belenenses | 14 | (0) |
| 2017−2019 | Vitória Setúbal | 37 | (0) |
| 2019–2021 | Hermannstadt | 68 | (0) |
| 2021–2022 | CFR Cluj | 0 | (0) |
| 2022 | Dinamo București | 8 | (0) |
| 2023 | Spartak Varna | 14 | (0) |
| 2024 | Košice | 11 | (0) |
| 2024–2026 | Felgueiras | 8 | (0) |
| 2026– | Paços Ferreira | 2 | (0) |

International career
| 2010 | Portugal U20 | 1 | (0) |
| 2011−2012 | Portugal U21 | 6 | (0) |
- * Club domestic league appearances and goals as of 11:41, 30 December 2025 (UTC)

Cristiano Pereira Figueiredo (born 29 November 1990), known simply as Cristiano, is a Portuguese professional footballer who plays as a goalkeeper for Liga 3 club Paços de Ferreira.

He played 80 Primeira Liga games for Braga, Académica, Belenenses and Vitória de Setúbal, while also representing three teams in Romania and having brief spells in Spain, Greece, Bulgaria and Slovakia.

== Club career ==
Born in Munich, Germany to Portuguese parents, Cristiano started playing youth football with Académico de Viseu FC, finishing his development with S.C. Braga. He spent his first two years as a senior as the latter's third choice, also being loaned to F.C. Vizela who acted as the farm team.

Cristiano was signed by Valencia CF from Spain on 24 July 2011, being assigned to the B side in the Segunda División B. He appeared in just five games during his only season.

In summer 2012, Cristiano returned to Portugal and Braga, being again third string with the main squad and competing with the re-created reserves in the Segunda Liga. He made his debut as a professional on 11 August, playing the full 90 minutes in a 2–2 away draw against S.L. Benfica B.

For the 2014–15 campaign, Cristiano went on loan to Académica de Coimbra of the Primeira Liga. He appeared in 28 games in all competitions, helping his team narrowly avoid relegation.

On 5 January 2016, having been deemed surplus to requirements by manager Paulo Fonseca as several other Portuguese players, Cristiano signed a two-and-a-half-year contract with Greek club Panetolikos FC. He returned to his country one year later, going on to represent C.F. Os Belenenses and Vitória de Setúbal in the top tier.

Cristiano joined FC Hermannstadt on 4 July 2019. Two years later, he agreed to a three-year deal at CFR Cluj also from the Romanian Liga I. However, in January 2022 the free agent signed with FC Dinamo București still in that country and league.

In January 2023, Cristiano moved to FC Spartak Varna of the First Professional Football League (Bulgaria). Twelve months later, he joined FC Košice of the Slovak First Football League on a one-and-a-half-year contract.

Cristiano returned to Portugal on 20 August 2024 after five years abroad, joining second-tier F.C. Felgueiras. The 35-year-old moved down to Liga 3 in July 2026, on a deal at F.C. Paços de Ferreira.

== International career ==
Cristiano won his first cap for the Portugal under-21 side on 9 February 2011, playing the second half of a 3–1 friendly win over Sweden in Cartaxo.

== Personal life ==
Cristiano's younger brother, Tobias, is also a footballer. A defender, he played youth football at Sporting CP.
