= Luca Florică =

Romanian footballer

Personal information
- Full name: Luca Alexandru Florică
- Date of birth: 6 October 2002 (age 24)
- Place of birth: Bucharest, Romania
- Height: 1.83 m (6 ft 0 in)
- Position: Left-back

Youth career
- –2019: Regal Sport București
- 2019–2020: Amiens

Senior career*
Years	Team	Apps	(Gls)
2020	Hermannstadt	1	(0)
2021–2022	Rapid București	10	(0)
2022	→ Academica Clinceni (loan)	14	(0)
2022–2023	Progresul Spartac	13	(2)
2023	FC Brasov	2	(0)
2023–2024	Tunari	10	(0)
2024–2025	AFC Câmpulung Muscel	7	(0)
2025	Chrudim	9	(0)
2025–2026	Olympic Charleroi	30	(1)

International career
2018	Romania U15	4	(0)
2018–2019	Romania U17	4	(0)
- * Club domestic league appearances and goals as of 20 April 2026

Luca Alexandru Florică (born 6 October 2002) is a Romanian professional footballer who plays as a left-back.

== Club career ==
In 2019 Florică was transferred by Amiens from Regal Sport București for €200.000, but was released after one year.

On 16 August 2020, Hermannstadt announced the signing of Florică.

On 10 January 2021, Florică signed a two-and-a-half-year contract with Romanian club Rapid București.

On 12 February 2022, Florică joined Liga I club Academica Clinceni on a six-month loan.

On 1 July 2022, Florică was loaned to Liga II club Progresul București.

== Personal life ==
Luca Florică is the son of businessman Claudiu Florică.
