= Thomas Chesneau =

French footballer (born 1999)

Personal information
- Full name: Thomas Julien Daniel Chesneau
- Date of birth: 28 April 1999 (age 27)
- Place of birth: Sèvres, France
- Height: 1.94 m (6 ft 4 in)
- Position: Goalkeeper

Youth career
- 2010–2018: Paris Saint-Germain

Senior career*
| Years | Team | Apps | (Gls) |
| 2018–2020 | Paris Saint-Germain B | 7 | (0) |
| 2020–2022 | Concordia Chiajna | 26 | (0) |
| 2022 | → Dinamo București (loan) | 2 | (0) |
| Total | | 35 | (0) |
- * Club domestic league appearances and goals as of 09:33, 18 January 2023 (UTC)

Thomas Julien Daniel Chesneau (born 28 April 1999) is a French professional footballer who plays as a goalkeeper.
