= Baptiste Aloé =

French footballer (born 1994)

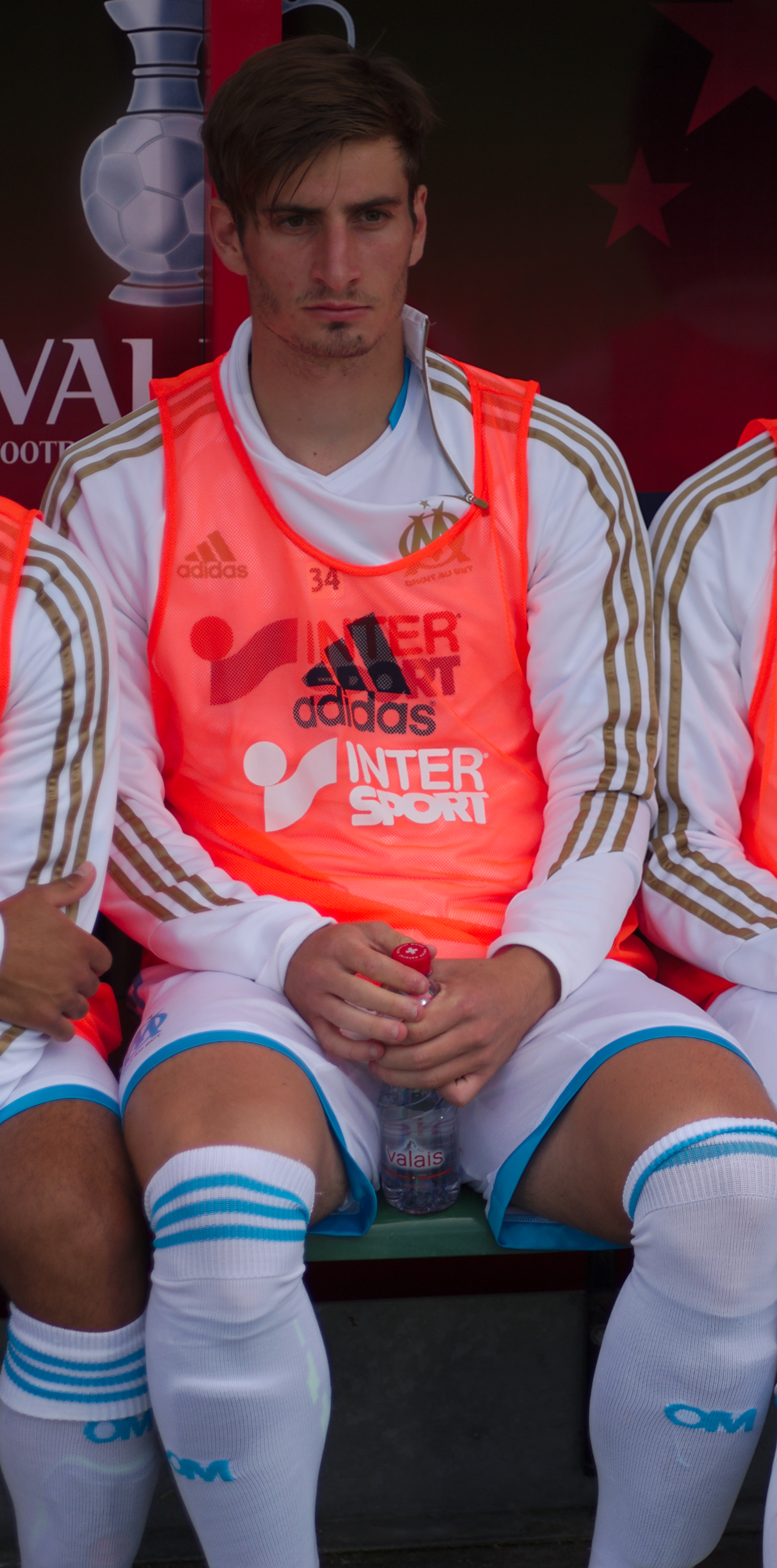
- Aloé among the substitutes in 2013

Personal information
- Date of birth: 29 June 1994 (age 32)
- Place of birth: La Ciotat, France
- Height: 1.84 m (6 ft 0 in)
- Position: Centre-back

Team information
- Current team: Mondorf-les-Bains

Youth career
- 2000–2003: E.S. de La Ciotat
- 2003–2012: Marseille

Senior career*
Years	Team	Apps	(Gls)
2012–2016	Marseille B	52	(4)
2014–2017	Marseille	14	(1)
2015–2016	→ Valenciennes (loan)	25	(0)
2016–2017	→ Valenciennes (loan)	21	(0)
2017–2020	Valenciennes	52	(1)
2020	Beerschot	3	(0)
2020–2021	Arouca	6	(1)
2022	Dinamo București	8	(1)
2022–2024	Nancy	11	(0)
2022–2024	Nancy B	9	(2)
2024–2025	SAS Épinal	43	(4)
2025–2026	Virton	10	(1)
2026–	Mondorf-les-Bains	2	(0)

International career
2012	France U18	2	(0)
2015	France U21	1	(0)
- * Club domestic league appearances and goals as of 16 September 2026

Baptiste Aloé (born 29 June 1994) is a French professional footballer who plays as a centre-back for Luxembourg National Division club Mondorf-les-Bains.

== Club career ==
=== Marseille ===
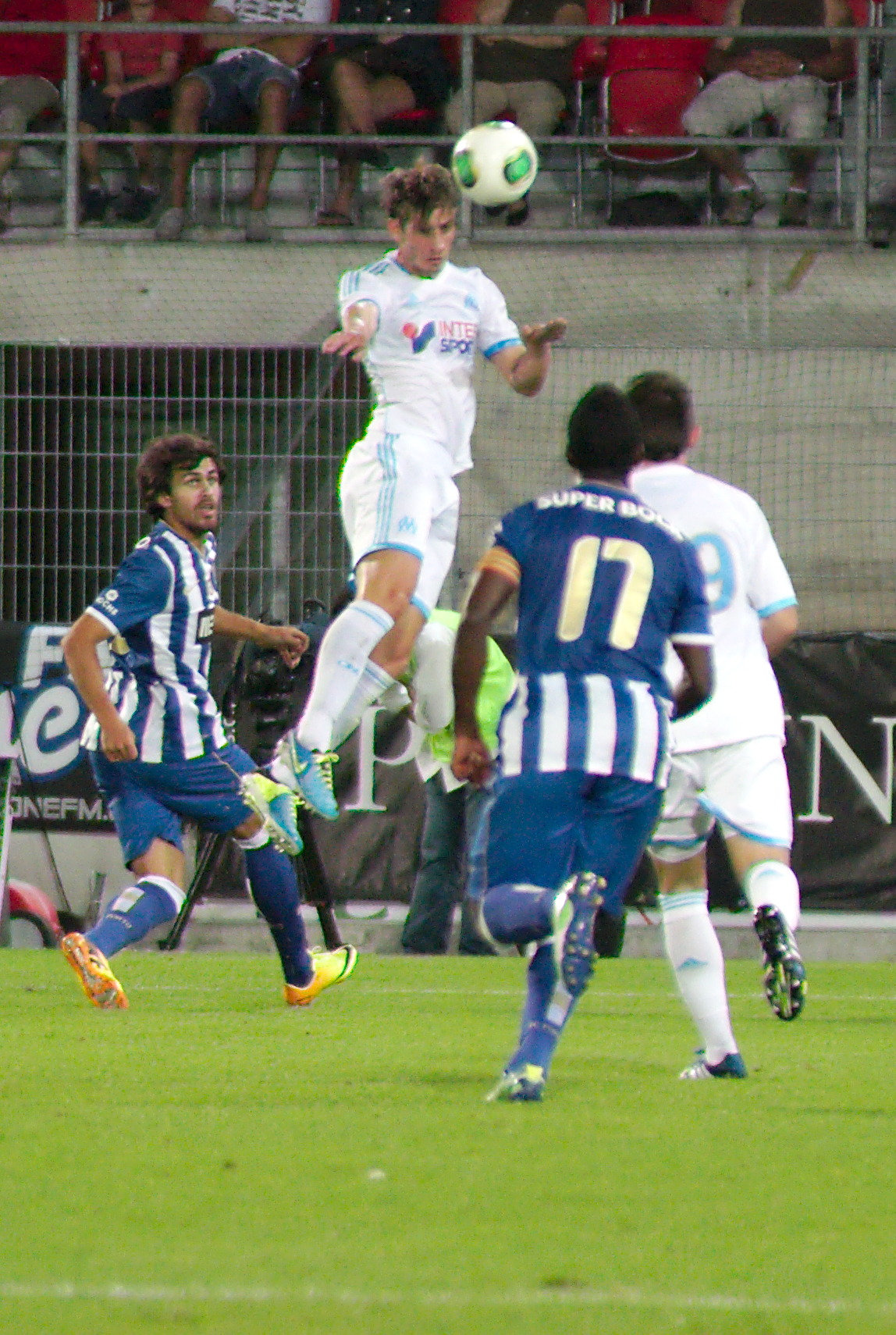
Aloé in action during the 2013 Valais Cup.

Aloé was born in La Ciotat, Bouches-du-Rhône and as a young boy played for his local club, E.S. de La Ciotat, before joining Marseille in 2003. He made his professional debut on 4 October 2012 in the 2012–13 Europa League campaign against Cypriot side AEL Limassol in a 5–1 home win. He played the full 90 minutes as a right back. He made his first appearance in Ligue 1 as a second-half substitute in the visit to Lens on 2 November 2014, and played the whole of the 3–1 win at home to Bordeaux three weeks later.

On 6 March 2015, he made his first professional goal against Toulouse FC. During this period, he took part in fourteen matches.

==== Loans to Valenciennes ====
In late August 2015, Aloé was loaned out to Ligue 2 club Valenciennes.

At the end of October 2016, Aloé had to undergo meniscus surgery and was ruled out from football for at least a month.

=== Valenciennes ===
After two years of being on loan, Aloé signed on with a three-year contract.

=== Dinamo București ===
On 3 February 2022, he signed a contract with Romania side Dinamo București.

=== Nancy ===
On 15 July 2022, Aloé joined Nancy on a two-year deal.

== International career ==
Aloé played twice for France at under-18 level in 2012.

Aloé played once for France at under-21 level in 2015.

== Career statistics ==
As of 19 June 2017

Appearances and goals by club, season and competition
Club	Season	League		Cup		League cup		Europe		Total	
Club	Season	Apps	Goals	Apps	Goals	Apps	Goals	Apps	Goals	Apps	Goals
Marseille	2012–13	—		—		—		1	0	1	0
Marseille	2014–15	14	1	0	0	0	0	0	0	14	1
Marseille	Total	14	1	0	0	0	0	1	0	15	1
Valenciennes (loan)	2015–16	25	0	2	0	—		—		27	0
Valenciennes (loan)	2016–17	21	0	0	0	—		—		21	0
Career total		60	1	2	0	0	0	1	0	63	1
