= Juan Cascini =

Argentine professional footballer

Bautista Cascini
Personal information
- Full name: Juan Bautista Cascini
- Date of birth: 4 June 1997 (age 29)
- Place of birth: La Plata, Argentina
- Height: 1.71 m (5 ft 7 in)
- Position: Midfielder

Team information
- Current team: Deportivo Madryn

Youth career
- 2005–2016: Estudiantes

Senior career*
Years	Team	Apps	(Gls)
2016–2019	Estudiantes	18	(1)
2018–2019	→ APOEL (loan)	3	(0)
2019–2020	Botoșani	11	(0)
2020–2022	Academica Clinceni	47	(9)
2022	The Strongest	0	(0)
2022–2023	UTA Arad	32	(2)
2023–2024	Slaven Belupo	9	(0)
2024	Voluntari	12	(1)
2024	Sol de América	3	(0)
2025–	Deportivo Madryn	11	(0)
- * Club domestic league appearances and goals as of 17:23, 3 August 2025 (UTC)

Juan Bautista Cascini (born 4 June 1997) is an Argentine professional footballer who plays as a midfielder for Primera Nacional club Deportivo Madryn.

== Career ==
After eleven years in the club's youth system from 2005, Cascini was promoted into the first-team of Argentine Primera División side Estudiantes in 2016. He was an unused substitute four times during 2016, before making his professional debut in 2016–17 on 28 August 2016 in an away win to Tigre. In his third league appearance, on 7 April 2017, he scored his first senior goal in a 1–4 victory versus Aldosivi. APOEL of the Cypriot First Division loaned Cascini in August 2018. In June 2023 he signed for Croatian club Slaven Belupo.

== Personal life ==
Bautista's father, Raúl Alfredo, was also a professional footballer.

== Career statistics ==
=== Club ===
As of match played 12 May 2024

Appearances and goals by club, season and competition
Club	Season	League			National Cup		League Cup		Continental		Other		Total	
Club	Season	Division	Apps	Goals	Apps	Goals	Apps	Goals	Apps	Goals	Apps	Goals	Apps	Goals
Estudiantes	2016–17	Primera División	11	1	1	0	—		4 (Note: Appearances in Copa Libertadores)	0	—		16	1
Estudiantes	2017–18	Primera División	7	0	—		—		3 (Note: Appearances in Copa Sudamericana)	0	—		10	0
Estudiantes	2018–19	Primera División	—		—		—		2	0	—		2	0
Estudiantes	Total		18	1	1	0	0	0	9	0	0	0	28	1
APOEL (loan)	2018–19	Cypriot First Division	3	0	1	0	—		—		1 (Note: Appearance in the Cypriot Super Cup)	0	5	0
Botoșani	2019–20	Liga I	9	0	2	0	—		—		0	0	11	0
Botoșani	2020–21	Liga I	2	0	—		—		—		0	0	2	0
Botoșani	Total		14	0	3	0	0	0	0	0	1	0	18	0
Academica Clinceni	2020–21	Liga I	28	2	1	0	—		—		—		29	2
Academica Clinceni	2021–22	Liga I	19	7	1	0	—		—		—		20	7
Academica Clinceni	Total		47	9	2	0	0	0	0	0	0	0	49	9
The Strongest	2022	Bolivian Primera División	—		—		—		7 (Note: Five appearances in Copa Libertadores and one goal, two appearances in Copa Sudamericana)	1	—		7	1
UTA Arad	2022–23	Liga I	32	2	5	0	—		—		—		37	2
Slaven Belupo	2023–24	HNL	9	0	1	1	—		—		—		10	1
Voluntari	2023–24	Liga I	12	1	2	0	—		—		—		14	1
Sol de América	2024	Primera División	1	0	0	0	—		0	0	0	0	1	0
Career total			133	13	14	1	0	0	16	1	1	0	164	15

== Honours ==
APOEL

- Cypriot First Division: 2018–19
- Cypriot Cup runner-up: 2018–19
- Cypriot Super Cup runner-up: 2018
