= Michel Espinosa =

Cameroonian-born French footballer (born 1993)

Personal information
- Date of birth: 15 September 1993 (age 33)
- Place of birth: Yaoundé, Cameroon
- Height: 1.90 m (6 ft 3 in)
- Position: Midfielder

Team information
- Current team: Chassieu Décines

Youth career
- 2002–2007: FA Carcassonne
- 2007–2012: Toulouse

Senior career*
Years	Team	Apps	(Gls)
2012–2014	Toulouse B	20	(2)
2014–2015	Trélissac	27	(1)
2015–2017	Clermont B	10	(0)
2015–2017	Clermont	45	(0)
2018	Laval	11	(1)
2018–2019	Istra 1961	8	(0)
2019–2020	Lyon-Duchère	4	(0)
2019–2020	Lyon-Duchère B	5	(0)
2020–2021	Botev Plovdiv	26	(3)
2021–2022	Dinamo București	3	(0)
2022–2023	Virton	11	(0)
2024–	Chassieu Décines	8	(0)

International career
2011	France U18	2	(0)
- * Club domestic league appearances and goals as of 7 December 2024

Michel Espinosa (born 15 September 1993) is a professional footballer who plays as a midfielder for Championnat National 3 club Chassieu Décines. Born in Cameroon, he was a French youth international.

== Club career ==
Espinosa started his career in the youth ranks of Toulouse FC where he spent seven seasons, but did not make it into the professional team. He moved to Trélissac in 2014 and spent a year there, before signing an amateur contract with Clermont. He made his Ligue 2 debut for the club in the first game of the 2015–16 Ligue 2 season, on 31 July 2015, in a 0–0 draw against Sochaux. He signed his first professional contract with the club on 3 November 2015.

Espinosa left Clermont in January 2018, signing for Laval in Championnat National until the end of the 2017–18 season. He was not retained at the end of his contract, and signed for Croatian side Istra 1961.

In June 2019, Espinosa signed a two-year contract with Lyon-Duchère.

In October 2021, he joined Dinamo București until the end of the season, with the option for an extension.

Espinosa joined Belgian Challenger Pro League club Virton on 9 August 2022 after a successful trial.
