= Vlad Morar =

Romanian footballer

Personal information
- Full name: Vlăduț Călin Morar
- Date of birth: 1 August 1993 (age 33)
- Place of birth: Crișeni, Romania
- Height: 1.83 m (6 ft 0 in)
- Position: Forward

Team information
- Current team: Politehnica Timișoara
- Number: 11

Youth career
- 2002–2006: Juventus Crișeni
- 2006–2007: Viitorul Zalău
- 2007–2008: Școala de Fotbal Gheorghe Popescu
- 2008–2010: Ardealul Cluj
- 2010–2011: Universitatea Cluj

Senior career*
Years	Team	Apps	(Gls)
2011–2012	Universitatea Cluj	7	(4)
2012–2014	Petrolul Ploiești	16	(2)
2014–2015	Universitatea Cluj	14	(3)
2015	Beitar Jerusalem	0	(0)
2016	Rapid București	15	(9)
2016	ASA Târgu Mureș	13	(4)
2017	Viitorul Constanța	14	(5)
2017–2019	Panetolikos	50	(16)
2020	Voluntari	8	(0)
2020	UTA Arad	12	(3)
2021–2022	Gaz Metan Mediaș	33	(6)
2022	Dinamo București	12	(4)
2022–2023	Farul Constanța	21	(4)
2023	Niki Volos	8	(0)
2024	UTA Arad	8	(0)
2024–2025	Argeș Pitești	13	(1)
2025–2026	CS Dinamo București	11	(0)
2026–	Politehnica Timișoara	11	(5)

International career
2013	Romania U21	2	(0)
- * Club domestic league appearances and goals as of 31 October 2026

Vlăduț Călin Morar (born 1 August 1993) is a Romanian professional footballer who plays as a forward for Liga II club Politehnica Timișoara.

== Career ==
=== Universitatea Cluj ===
Morar was the most efficient player of the 2010–11 season, after scoring 1 goal in just 1 minute of play.

=== Petrolul Ploiești ===
He moved to Petrolul Ploiești in the 2012 summer transfer window, after a mass of players from Universitatea Cluj signed with the "Yellow Wolves".

=== Panetolikos ===
On 31 July 2017 he signed a three-year contract with Panetolikos. On 26 August 2017 he scored his first goal in a 2-2 home draw against Atromitos. On 19 November 2017 he scored with a sensational shot in a 1-1 away draw against PAS Giannina, which earned him the best goal award for matchday 11. On 26 November 2017 Morar scored in a 3-1 home win against AEL, which was the first since matchday 6. On 6 January 2018 he scored with a penalty in a 4-1 home loss against title contenders, AEK Athens. On 21 January 2018 he opened the score in a 1-1 home draw against Panionios. On 18 February 2018 he scored two goals, both with penalties, in a 2-1 away win against Levadiakos. On 15 April 2018, he opened the score, just after 38 seconds, in an eventual 4-2 away loss against AEL. One week later, he scored with a penalty in a 1-0 home win against Lamia.

On 3 September 2018, he scored a brace against OFI. These were his first goals for the 2018–19 season. On 16 September 2018, he scored in a 1-1 away draw against Xanthi, exploiting on Živko Živković's poor reaction. On 6 October 2018, he scored in a 2-1 home win against Levadiakos. On 28 October 2018, he opened the score with a lucky free-kick in an eventual 1-1 home win against Asteras Tripolis. On 10 December 2018, he scored in a 2-1 home win against Apollon Smyrnis.

His first goal for the 2019–20 season came in a 3-1 away defeat against OFI.

=== FC Voluntari ===
On 14 January 2020, Vlad Morar signed a 6-month contract with FC Voluntari.

== Honours ==
Petrolul Ploiești

- Cupa României: 2012–13

Rapid București

- Liga II: 2015–16

Viitorul Constanța

- Liga I: 2016–17
- Supercupa României runner-up: 2017

Farul Constanța

- Liga I: 2022–23

Argeș Pitești

- Liga II: 2024–25

ASU Politehnica Timișoara

- Liga III: 2025–26
