= Slovakia national under-21 football team =

Slovakia U-21
- Nickname(s): Repre; Sokolíci (Little Falcons)
- Association: Slovenský futbalový zväz
- Confederation: UEFA (Europe)
- Head coach: Jaroslav Kentoš
- Home stadium: Štadión pod Zoborom
- FIFA code: SVK
First colours	Second colours

First international
- Slovakia 0–3 France (Myjava, Slovakia; 6 September 1994)

Biggest win
- Malta 0–6 Slovakia (Valletta, Malta; 30 March 1997); Latvia 0–6 Slovakia (Riga, Latvia; 11 October 2011); Luxembourg 1–7 Slovakia (Ettelbruck, Luxembourg; 11 June 2013); Slovakia 6–0 Armenia (Žiar nad Hronom, Slovakia; 6 June 2019); Slovakia 6–0 Liechtenstein (Nitra, Slovakia; 17 November 2020)

Biggest defeat
- 4–0 defeats on three occasions

UEFA U-21 Championship
- Appearances: 3 (first in 2000)
- Best result: Fourth place (2000)

The Slovakia national under-21 football team, controlled by the Slovak Football Association, is Slovakia's national under-21 football team and is considered to be a feeder team for the Slovakia national football team.

== European Under-21 Championship record ==
- 1978 to 1994 - see Czechoslovakia

Year	Round	Position	GP	W	D	L	GF	GA
(Spain) 1996	did not qualify	–	–	–	–	–	–	–
(Romania) 1998	did not qualify	–	–	–	–	–	–	–
(Slovakia) 2000	Fourth place	4th	4	2	1	1	5	3
(Switzerland) 2002	did not qualify	–	–	–	–	–	–	–
(Germany) 2004	did not qualify	–	–	–	–	–	–	–
(Portugal) 2006	did not qualify	–	–	–	–	–	–	–
(Netherlands) 2007	did not qualify	–	–	–	–	–	–	–
(Sweden) 2009	did not qualify	–	–	–	–	–	–	–
(Denmark) 2011	did not qualify	–	–	–	–	–	–	–
(Israel) 2013	did not qualify	–	–	–	–	–	–	–
(Czech Republic) 2015	did not qualify	–	–	–	–	–	–	–
(Poland) 2017	Group stage	5th	3	2	0	1	6	3
(Italy) (San Marino) 2019	did not qualify	–	–	–	–	–	–	–
(Hungary) (Slovenia) 2021	did not qualify	–	–	–	–	–	–	–
(Romania) (Georgia (country)) 2023	did not qualify	–	–	–	–	–	–	–
(Slovakia) 2025	Group stage	–	3	1	0	2	4	5
(Albania) (Serbia) 2027	did not qualify	–	–	–	–	–	–	–
Total	3/17	4th	10	5	1	4	15	11

Key: GP: Games played, W: Wins, D: Draws, L: Losses, GF: Goals for, GA: Goals against

== UEFA European Under-21 Championship ==
=== 2027 UEFA European Under-21 Championship qualification ===
Pos	Team	Pld	W	D	L	GF	GA	GD	Pts	Qualification	England	Ireland	Slovakia	Moldova	Andorra	Kazakhstan
1	England	10	7	2	1	23	7	+16	23	Final tournament	—	2–0	0–0	4–1	1–0	4–2
2	Republic of Ireland	10	6	2	2	16	14	+2	20 (Note: Head-to-head points: Republic of Ireland 4, Slovakia 1.)	Play-offs	3–1	—	2–2	1–1	1–0	4–3
3	Slovakia	10	6	2	2	17	13	+4	20		0–4	0–2	—	2–0	3–0	2–1
4	Moldova	10	2	3	5	12	19	−7	9		0–4	1–2	2–3	—	3–0	3–2
5	Andorra	10	2	2	6	7	12	−5	8		1–1	4–0	1–2	0–0	—	1–0
6	Kazakhstan	10	1	1	8	11	21	−10	4		0–2	0–1	1–3	1–1	1–0	—

Source: UEFA
Legend: Blue = home team win; Yellow = draw; Red = away team win.
Rules for classification: Tiebreakers

== Players ==
=== Current squad ===
The following players were selected for the 2025 UEFA European Under-21 Championship. Caps and goals correct as of 11 June 2025, after the match against Spain.

No.	Pos.	Player	Date of birth (age)	Caps	Goals	Club
1	GK	Ľubomír Belko	4 February 2002 (age 24)	10	0	(Slovak Football Association) Žilina
12	GK	Adam Danko	27 June 2003 (age 23)	1	0	(Slovak Football Association) Podbrezová
21	GK	Tomáš Frühwald	23 September 2002 (age 24)	4	0	(Football Association of the Czech Republic) Bohemians
2	DF	Jakub Jakubko	24 August 2004 (age 22)	6	0	(Slovak Football Association) Košice
3	DF	Filip Mielke	9 April 2005 (age 21)	3	0	(Slovak Football Association) Podbrezová
4	DF	Adam Obert	23 August 2002 (age 24)	14	0	(Italian Football Federation) Cagliari
5	DF	Dominik Javorček	2 November 2002 (age 24)	21	2	(German Football Association) Holstein Kiel
13	DF	Nicolas Šikula	15 May 2003 (age 23)	8	0	(Slovak Football Association) Dukla Banská Bystrica
16	DF	Marek Ujlaky	3 December 2003 (age 22)	2	0	(Slovak Football Association) Spartak Trnava
20	DF	Adam Gaži	1 March 2003 (age 23)	0	0	(Slovak Football Association) Skalica
23	DF	Samuel Kopásek	22 May 2003 (age 23)	5	1	(Slovak Football Association) Žilina
8	MF	Martin Šviderský	4 October 2002 (age 24)	16	0	(Royal Spanish Football Federation) Almería
10	MF	Sebastian Nebyla	25 January 2002 (age 24)	25	3	(Football Association of the Czech Republic) Jablonec
11	MF	Artur Gajdoš	20 January 2004 (age 22)	7	2	(Slovak Football Association) Trenčín
14	MF	Mário Sauer	15 May 2004 (age 22)	10	3	(French Football Federation) Toulouse
15	MF	Leo Sauer	16 December 2005 (age 20)	2	0	(Royal Dutch Football Association) NAC Breda
22	MF	Tomáš Rigo	3 July 2002 (age 24)	7	1	(Football Association of the Czech Republic) Baník Ostrava
6	FW	Dominik Hollý	11 November 2003 (age 23)	2	0	(Football Association of the Czech Republic) Jablonec
7	FW	Tomáš Suslov	7 June 2002 (age 24)	5	2	(Italian Football Federation) Hellas Verona
9	FW	Roman Čerepkai	6 April 2002 (age 24)	14	0	(Slovak Football Association) Košice
17	FW	Adrián Kaprálik	10 June 2002 (age 24)	30	8	(Slovak Football Association) Žilina
18	FW	Nino Marcelli	29 May 2005 (age 21)	8	3	(Slovak Football Association) Slovan Bratislava
19	FW	Timotej Jambor	4 April 2003 (age 23)	7	2	(Slovak Football Association) Žilina

=== Recent call-ups ===
The following players have also been called up to the Slovakia U21 squad in the past 12 months and remain eligible to play for the U21 team.

Pos.	Player	Date of birth (age)	Caps	Goals	Club	Latest call-up

- ^{INJ} Withdrew/Unavailable due to an injury or an illness.
- ^{ALT} Alternate – replaces a member of the squad in case of injury/unavailability

=== Past squads ===
- 2000 UEFA European Under-21 Football Championship squad
- 2017 UEFA European Under-21 Football Championship squad

== Managerial history ==
Head coach	Assistant	Years
(Slovakia) Milan Lešický	(Slovakia) Jozef Štafura	1993–1997
(Slovakia) Jozef Barmoš	(Slovakia) Bohumil Andrejko	1997–1998
(Slovakia) Dušan Radolský	(Slovakia) Bohumil Andrejko	1998–2000
(Slovakia) Stanislav Griga	(Slovakia) Vladimír Goffa	2000–2001
(Slovakia) Mikuláš Komanický	(Slovakia) Ján Švehlík	2002–2003
(Slovakia) Ladislav Jurkemik	(Slovakia) Ján Gabriel	2004
(Slovakia) Jozef Bubenko	(Slovakia) Ján Gabriel	2004–2005
(Slovakia) Ladislav Petráš	(Slovakia) Karol Brezík	2006
(Slovakia) Jozef Barmoš	(Slovakia) Jozef Vukušič (Slovakia) Viliam Hýravý (Slovakia) Roland Praj	2007–2008
(Slovakia) Boris Kitka	(Slovakia) Jozef Daňko	2009–2010
(Slovakia) Ľubomír Nosický	(Slovakia) Peter Nemečkay	2010
(Slovakia) Ivan Galád	(Slovakia) Norbert Hrnčár	2011–2014
(Czech Republic) Pavel Hapal	(Slovakia) Oto Brunegraf	2015–2018
(Slovakia) Oto Brunegraf	none	2018
(Slovakia) Adrián Guľa	(Slovakia) Marián Zimen	2018–2019
(Slovakia) Jaroslav Kentoš	(Slovakia) Tibor Goljan	2019–

== Other youth record ==
- (Norway) 2002 UEFA European Under-19 Championship – Third place
- (United Arab Emirates) 2003 FIFA World Youth Championship – Round of 16

== See also ==
- Slovakia national football team
- Czechoslovakia national under-21 football team
- Slovakia national under-20 football team
- Slovakia national under-19 football team
- Slovakia national under-18 football team
- Slovakia national under-17 football team
- Slovakia national under-16 football team
