= 2027 UEFA European Under-21 Championship qualification play-offs =

The play-offs of the 2027 UEFA European Under-21 Championship qualifying competition involves eight of the nine runners-up in the qualifying group stage, the top-ranked team being directly qualified for the tournament.

== Ranking of second-placed teams ==
Pos	Grp	Team (Note: Due to differing group sizes, results against sixth-place teams were not considered when ranking group runners-up.)	Pld	W	D	L	GF	GA	GD	Pts	Qualification
1	E	Poland	8	7	0	1	20	7	+13	21	Final tournament
2	F	Greece	8	7	0	1	19	6	+13	21	Play-offs
3	A	Finland	8	5	2	1	19	7	+12	17	Play-offs
4	I	Denmark	8	4	3	1	15	6	+9	15	Play-offs
5	C	Iceland	8	4	2	2	15	8	+7	14	Play-offs
6	D	Republic of Ireland	8	4	2	2	11	11	0	14	Play-offs
7	H	Turkey	8	3	4	1	9	8	+1	13	Play-offs
8	G	Netherlands	8	3	3	2	15	10	+5	12	Play-offs
9	B	Czech Republic	8	3	3	2	10	5	+5	12	Play-offs

Source: UEFA
Rules for classification: 1) points; 2) goal difference; 3) goals scored; 4) away goals scored; 5) wins; 6) away wins; 7) disciplinary points; 8) coefficient ranking.

== Draw ==
The draw for the play-offs was held on 9 October 2026 in Nyon, Switzerland, with all teams unseeded.

== Summary ==
The four play-off winners qualify for the final tournament.

Team 1	Agg.	Team 2	1st leg	2nd leg
Denmark	3–5	Netherlands	0–3	3–2
Iceland	2–2 (4–5 p)	Greece	1–1	1–1 (a.e.t.)
Finland	3–2	Republic of Ireland	1–0	2–2 (a.e.t.)
Turkey	1–2	Czech Republic	0–1	1–1

== Matches ==
All times are CET (UTC+1), as listed by UEFA (local times, if different, are in parentheses).

13 November 2026
18:30

Denmark	0–3	Netherlands
	Report	Read 6'; Høgsberg 14' (o.g.); van Bergen 39'

Vejle Stadium, Vejle
Attendance: 2,286
Referee: Antoni Bandić (Bosnia and Herzegovina)
17 November 2026
18:30

Netherlands	2–3	Denmark
van Bergen 35'; Haen 71'	Report	Bischoff 21'; Ross 32'; Clem 53'

Yanmar Stadion, Almere
Attendance: 3,618

Netherlands won 5–3 on aggregate.

12 November 2026
14:00 (13:00 UTC+0)

Iceland	1–1	Greece
Mikaelsson 88'	Report	Mikaelsson 90+2' (o.g.)

Thróttarvöllur, Reykjavik
Attendance: 220
Referee: Nathan Verboomen (Belgium)
16 November 2026
18:00 (19:00 UTC+2)

Greece	1–1 (a.e.t.)	Iceland
K. Kostoulas 90+1'	Report	Guðjohnsen 72'
Penalties
Mythou (penalty scored); Koutsias (penalty scored); K. Kostoulas (penalty scored); Kaloskamis (penalty scored); Mouzakitis (penalty scored)	5–4	(penalty missed) Daðason; (penalty scored) Mikaelsson; (penalty scored) Karlsson; (penalty scored) G. Guðmundsson; (penalty scored) Haraldsson

Apostolos Nikolaidis Stadium, Athens
Attendance: 9,741

2–2 on aggregate. Greece won 5–4 on penalties.

13 November 2026
17:15 (18:15 UTC+2)

Finland	1–0	Republic of Ireland
Helén 45+8'	Report

Tammelan Stadion, Tampere
Attendance: 5,972
Referee: Christian-Petru Ciochirca (Austria)
17 November 2026
18:45 (17:45 UTC+0)

Republic of Ireland	2–2 (a.e.t.)	Finland
Koné-Doherty 62'; Ayinde 77'	Report	Siltanen 85' (pen.); Laine 108'

Turners Cross, Cork
Attendance: 5,177

Finland won 3–2 on aggregate.

13 November 2026
17:00 (19:00 UTC+3)

Turkey	0–1	Czech Republic
	Report	Kačor 48'

Rize City Stadium, Rize
Attendance: 10,471
Referee: Jakob Sundberg (Denmark)
17 November 2026
17:00

Czech Republic	1−1	Turkey
Škrkoň 35'	Report	İlkhan 82'

Malšovická aréna, Hradec Kralove
Attendance: 8,017

Czech Republic won 2–1 on aggregate.

== Goalscorers ==
There have been 9 goals scored in 5 matches, for an average of 1.8 goals per match (as of 16 November 2026).

1 goal

- (Czech Republic national under-21 football team) Pavel Kačor
- (Finland national under-21 football team) Onni Helén
- (Greece national under-21 football team) Konstantinos Kostoulas
- (Iceland national under-21 football team) Daníel Guðjohnsen
- (Iceland national under-21 football team) Hilmir Mikaelsson
- (Netherlands national under-21 football team) Givairo Read
- (Netherlands national under-21 football team) Thom van Bergen

1 own goal

- (Denmark national under-21 football team) Lucas Høgsberg (against Netherlands)
- (Iceland national under-21 football team) Hilmir Mikaelsson (against Greece)
