= Republic of Ireland national under-21 football team =

National under-21 association football team representing Republic of Ireland

Republic of Ireland Under-21
- Nickname: Boys in Green
- Association: Football Association of Ireland (FAI)
- Head coach: Jim Crawford
- Captain: James Abankwah
- Most caps: Conor Coventry (28)
- Top scorer: Robbie Brady (7); Kevin Doyle (7); Sinclair Armstrong (7)
First colours	Second colours

First international
- (Republic of Ireland) Rep. Ireland 1–1 Northern Ireland (Dublin; 8 March 1978)

Biggest win
- San Marino 0–7 Rep. Ireland (Republic of Ireland) (Serravalle, San Marino; 22 March 2024)

Biggest defeat
- Germany 8–0 Rep. Ireland (Republic of Ireland) (Baunatal, Germany; 23 March 1993)

UEFA U-21 Championship
- Appearances: Have never qualified

The Republic of Ireland national under-21 football team is a representative team of Irish football players. It is governed by the Football Association of Ireland and represents them at Under-21 level against the national teams of other national associations. The team played its first match in 1978 and has competed in the UEFA European Under-21 Championship since 1988.

== History ==
As a European under-21 team, the Republic of Ireland participates in the UEFA European Under-21 Championship, which takes place every two years. There is no Under-21 World Cup, although there is an Under-20 World Cup. Ireland did not enter the first five Under-21 Championships, entering for the first time in 1988 but failing to qualify. Ireland have never qualified for the European Under-21 Championships.

=== UEFA European Under-21 Championship record ===
UEFA European Under-21 Football Championship record								UEFA European Under-21 Football Championship Qualification record					
Year	Round	Pld	W	D *	L	GF	GA	Pld	W	D	L	GF	GA
1978	did not enter							–	–	–	–	–	–
1980	did not enter							–	–	–	–	–	–
1982	did not enter							–	–	–	–	–	–
1984	did not enter							–	–	–	–	–	–
1986	did not enter							–	–	–	–	–	–
1988	did not qualify							4	0	2	2	3	7
1990	did not enter							–	–	–	–	–	–
1992	did not qualify							6	1	0	5	5	14
(France) 1994	did not qualify							8	1	1	6	7	20
(Spain) 1996	did not qualify							8	2	2	4	7	9
(Romania) 1998	did not qualify							8	3	0	5	11	7
(Slovakia) 2000	did not qualify							8	4	2	2	13	12
(Switzerland) 2002	did not qualify							8	4	1	3	10	7
(Germany) 2004	did not qualify							8	2	2	4	8	11
(Portugal) 2006	did not qualify							8	1	2	5	10	14
(Netherlands) 2007	did not qualify							2	1	0	1	2	1
(Sweden) 2009	did not qualify							8	1	2	5	4	14
(Denmark) 2011	did not qualify							10	1	4	5	5	11
(Israel) 2013	did not qualify							8	4	1	3	15	10
(Czech Republic) 2015	did not qualify							8	2	2	4	10	12
(Poland) 2017	did not qualify							10	4	0	6	14	17
(Italy) 2019	did not qualify							10	4	2	4	12	15
(Hungary) (Slovenia) 2021	did not qualify							10	6	1	3	15	8
(Romania) (Georgia (country)) 2023	did not qualify							12	6	3	3	17	11
(Slovakia) 2025	did not qualify							10	5	4	1	24	12
(Albania) (Serbia) 2027	did not qualify							12	6	3	3	18	17
Total	-							156	54	34	68	202	216

*Draws include knockout matches decided by penalty shootout.

== UEFA European Under-21 Championship ==
=== 2027 UEFA European Under-21 Championship qualification ===
Pos	Team	Pld	W	D	L	GF	GA	GD	Pts	Qualification	England	Ireland	Slovakia	Moldova	Andorra	Kazakhstan
1	England	10	7	2	1	23	7	+16	23	Final tournament	—	2–0	0–0	4–1	1–0	4–2
2	Republic of Ireland	10	6	2	2	16	14	+2	20 (Note: Head-to-head points: Republic of Ireland 4, Slovakia 1.)	Play-offs	3–1	—	2–2	1–1	1–0	4–3
3	Slovakia	10	6	2	2	17	13	+4	20		0–4	0–2	—	2–0	3–0	2–1
4	Moldova	10	2	3	5	12	19	−7	9		0–4	1–2	2–3	—	3–0	3–2
5	Andorra	10	2	2	6	7	12	−5	8		1–1	4–0	1–2	0–0	—	1–0
6	Kazakhstan	10	1	1	8	11	21	−10	4		0–2	0–1	1–3	1–1	1–0	—

Source: UEFA
Legend: Blue = home team win; Yellow = draw; Red = away team win.
Rules for classification: Tiebreakers

== Results and fixtures ==
The following is a list of match results in the last 12 months, as well as any future matches that have been scheduled.

Legend

Win Draw Lose Fixture

=== 2025 ===
14 November UEFA European Under-21 Championship Qualification	England	2–0	Republic of Ireland	Birmingham, England
19:45 GMT	Divin Mubama (penalty missed) 23'; Divin Mubama 60' (pen.); Tyrique George 90+1'	Report		Stadium: St Andrew's; Attendance: 9,961; Referee: Iuliana Demetrescu (Romania)

18 November UEFA European Under-21 Championship Qualification	Andorra	4–0	Republic of Ireland	Andorra la Vella, Andorra
18:00 GMT	Gerard Solà 16'; Hugo Ferreira 23'; Ian Olivera 49'; Gerard Solà 74' (pen.)	Report		Stadium: Estadi Nacional; Attendance: 250; Referee: Anton Lashuk (Belarus)

=== 2026 ===
26 March UEFA European Under-21 Championship Qualification	Republic of Ireland	1–1	Moldova	Dublin, Ireland
17:15 GMT	Jamie Mullins 26'	Report	Vasile Luchița 20'	Stadium: Tallaght Stadium; Attendance: 860; Referee: Walter Altmann (Austria)

31 March UEFA European Under-21 Championship Qualification	Kazakhstan	0–1	Republic of Ireland	Turkistan, Kazakhstan
16:00 GMT		Report	Oisin Gallagher 89'	Stadium: Turkestan Arena; Attendance: 6,100; Referee: Karl Koppel (Estonia)

6 June Friendly	Croatia	2–2	Republic of Ireland	Zagreb, Croatia
16:30 GMT	Luka Vrbančić 8' (pen.); Seán Grehan 75' (o.g.)	Report	Sam Curtis 19'; Seán Grehan 81'	Stadium: Gradski Stadion; Referee: Filip Dragaševic (Croatia)

9 June Friendly	Republic of Ireland	0–0	Qatar	Zagreb, Croatia
15:45 GMT		Report		Stadium: Gradski Stadion

25 September UEFA European Under-21 Championship Qualification	Slovakia	0–2	Republic of Ireland	Košice, Slovakia
17:00 GMT	Nino Marcelli (penalty missed) 30'	Report	Tommy Lonergan 2'; Seán Grehan 57'	Stadium: Košická Futbalová Aréna; Attendance: 5,432; Referee: Viktor Kopiievskyi (Ukraine)

29 September UEFA European Under-21 Championship Qualification	Republic of Ireland	4–3	Kazakhstan	Cork, Ireland
19:00 GMT	Alex Murphy 21'; Jamie Mullins 29'; Sam Curtis 48'; Tommy Lonergan 86' (pen.)	Report	Artyom Litosh 1'; Ramazan Karimov 38'; Sultan Askarov 52'; Artyom Litosh (red card) 90+5'	Stadium: Turners Cross; Attendance: 771; Referee: Loïc Thomas (Luxembourg)

6 October UEFA European Under-21 Championship Qualification	Republic of Ireland	3–1	England	Cork, Ireland
18:00 GMT	Tommy Lonergan 22'; Conor McManus 38'; Tommy Lonergan 63'	Report	Tyler Dibling 8'	Stadium: Turners Cross; Attendance: 5,427; Referee: Alesandro Dudic (Switzerland)

13 November UEFA European Under-21 Championship Qualification Playoff 1st Leg	Finland	1–0	Republic of Ireland	Tampere, Finland
16:15 GMT	Onni Helén 45+8'	Report		Stadium: Tammelan Stadion; Attendance: 5,972; Referee: Christian-Petru Ciochirca (Austria)

17 November UEFA European Under-21 Championship Qualification Playoff 2nd Leg	Republic of Ireland	2–2 (a.e.t.) (2–3 agg.)	Finland	Cork, Ireland
17:45 GMT	Trent Koné-Doherty 62'; Leon Ayinde 77'	Report	Matias Siltanen 85' (pen.); Miska Ylitolva (yellow card) 90+5' (yellow-red card); Lauri Laine 108'	Stadium: Turners Cross; Attendance: 5,177; Referee: Joey Kooij (Netherlands)

== Staff ==
The Under-21s' management team includes:

Position	Name	Appointed
Head coach	(Republic of Ireland) Jim Crawford	5 April 2020
Assistant coach	(Republic of Ireland) Paul McShane	28 August 2023
Goalkeeping coach	(Republic of Ireland) Rene Gilmartin	24 April 2020
Lead Performance Analyst	(Republic of Ireland) Martin Doyle	April 2020
Sports Scientist	(Republic of Ireland) Paul Walsh	18 March 2023
Sports Scientist	(Republic of Ireland) Paul Gavin	18 March 2025
Chartered Physiotherapist	(Brazil) Glauber Barduzzi	24 April 2019
Athletic Therapist	(Republic of Ireland) Kieran Murray	19 March 2022
Doctor	(Republic of Ireland) Dr Mortimer O'Connor	March 2021
Kitman	(Republic of Ireland) John Crudden	May 2023

== Players ==
=== Current squad ===
Players born on or after 1 January 2006 are eligible for the 2029 UEFA European Under-21 Championship.

The following players were called up (and remain eligible) for the 2027 UEFA European Under-21 Championship qualification play-offs against Finland on 13 & 17 November 2026.

Note: Names in bold denote players that have been capped for the senior team.

Caps and goals updated as of 17 November 2026, after the game vs Finland.

No.	Pos.	Player	Date of birth (age)	Caps	Goals	Club
2	DF	Matteo Egan	19 November 2007 (age 18)	2	0	(Italian Football Federation) Empoli
12	DF	Cathal McCarthy	31 August 2006 (age 20)	8	0	(Scottish Football Association) Kilmarnock
20	DF	**Adam Brennan**	29 May 2007 (age 19)	3	0	(Football Association of Ireland) Shamrock Rovers
6	MF	Jacob Devaney	11 June 2007 (age 19)	14	0	(Scottish Football Association) Hibernian
14	MF	**Rory Finneran**	29 February 2008 (age 18)	6	0	(The Football Association) Notts County
21	MF	Romeo Akachukwu	28 May 2006 (age 20)	6	0	(The Football Association) Southampton
7	FW	Trent Koné-Doherty	30 June 2006 (age 20)	11	1	(Norwegian Football Federation) Molde FK
10	FW	**Owen Elding**	7 March 2006 (age 20)	2	0	(Scottish Football Association) Hibernian
15	FW	Kian McMahon-Brown	3 August 2008 (age 18)	3	0	(The Football Association) Shrewsbury Town

=== Previous call-ups ===
The following players have also been called up to the Republic of Ireland under-21 squad and remain eligible:

Pos.	Player	Date of birth (age)	Caps	Goals	Club	Latest call-up
GK	Marcus Gill	11 May 2007 (age 19)	0	0	(Scotland) East Kilbride	v. England, 6 October 2026
GK	Joe Collins	25 February 2007 (age 19)	0	0	(Wales) Swansea City	v. Kazakhstan, 29 September 2026^{PRE}
DF	Cory O'Sullivan	2 May 2006 (age 20)	3	0	(Republic of Ireland) Shamrock Rovers	v. Qatar, 9 June 2026
DF	Sean Keogh	15 April 2006 (age 20)	2	0	(England) Brighton & Hove Albion	v. Qatar, 9 June 2026
DF	Freddie Turley	3 July 2006 (age 20)	0	0	(England) Derby County	v. Andorra, 9 September 2025
MF	Grady McDonnell	17 February 2008 (age 18)	1	0	(England) Nottingham Forest	v. England, 6 October 2026
MF	John O'Sullivan	29 January 2006 (age 20)	2	0	(Republic of Ireland) Shamrock Rovers	v. Qatar, 9 June 2026
MF	Naj Razi	28 October 2006 (age 20)	1	0	(Republic of Ireland) Shamrock Rovers	v. Qatar, 9 June 2026
MF	Cillian Murphy	22 July 2009 (age 17)	1	0	(Republic of Ireland) Cork City	v. Qatar, 9 June 2026
MF	Gabriel Kelly	7 December 2006 (age 19)	1	0	(England) Stoke City	v. Qatar, 9 June 2026
MF	Aarón Ochoa Moloney	18 April 2007 (age 19)	1	0	(Spain) Malaga	v. Kazakhstan, 31 March 2026
MF	Cathal O'Sullivan	5 March 2007 (age 19)	2	0	(England) Preston North End	v. Qatar, 10 June 2025
FW	Ike Orazi	11 June 2007 (age 19)	0	0	(France) Reims	v. Finland, 13 November 2026^{INJ}
FW	Michael Noonan	31 July 2008 (age 18)	9	1	(Republic of Ireland) Shamrock Rovers	v. England, 6 October 2026
FW	**Jaden Umeh**	18 March 2008 (age 18)	2	0	(Portugal) Benfica	v. Kazakhstan, 31 March 2026
FW	Sean Patton	25 July 2006 (age 20)	1	0	(England) Reading	v. Kazakhstan, 31 March 2026
FW	**Mason Melia**	22 September 2007 (age 19)	6	3	(England) Lincoln City	v. Andorra, 18 November 2025
FW	Cian Dillon	4 April 2006 (age 20)	2	0	(Republic of Ireland) Dundalk	v. Andorra, 18 November 2025
^{INJ} Withdrew from latest squad due to injury^{WD} Withdrew from latest squad^{PRE} Preliminary squad / standby^{SUS} Player is suspended^{SEN} Player called up to most recent Senior squad

== Records ==
- Top Goals: Kevin Doyle, Robbie Brady & Sinclair Armstrong 7 Goals
- Youngest Goal Scorer: Michael Noonan 17 years 1 month 09 days vs Moldova (2025)
- Biggest Win: 7–0 vs San Marino (2024)
- Biggest Defeat: 0–8 vs Germany (1993)
- Youngest Player: John Connolly 15 years 3 months 23 days vs Albania (1992)
