= 2027 UEFA European Under-21 Championship qualification =

Tournament details
- Dates: 5 June 2025 – 17 November 2026
- Teams: 51 (from 1 confederation)

Tournament statistics
- Matches played: 248
- Goals scored: 784 (3.16 per match)
- Attendance: 561,652 (2,265 per match)
- Top scorer: (Germany national under-21 football team) Nicolò Tresoldi (10 goals)

Result of teams participating in UEFA European Under-21 Championship qualification: Qualified (first in group) Qualified (host country) Qualified (best runner-up in group stage) / Qualified (after play-offs) Reached the play-offs Not qualified / Did not enter Suspended Not a UEFA member

The 2027 UEFA European Under-21 Championship qualifying competition is a men's under-21 football competition to determine the 14 teams that would be joining the automatically qualified co-hosts Albania and Serbia in the 2027 UEFA European Under-21 Championship final tournament.

51 UEFA member national teams will enter the qualifying competition. Players born on or after 1 January 2004 are eligible to participate.

Two teams are not taking part in this tournament: Russia was suspended on 28 February 2022 by FIFA and UEFA from all competitions due to its invasion of Ukraine, while the Liechtenstein team has been temporarily dissolved based on a decision announced on 5 October 2022.

== Format ==
The qualifying competition consisted of the following two rounds:

- Qualifying group stage: The 51 teams were drawn into nine groups: six groups of six teams and three groups of five teams. Each group will be played in home-and-away round-robin format. The nine group winners and the best runner-up (not counting results against the sixth-placed team) will qualify directly for the final tournament, while the remaining eight runners-up will advance to the play-offs.
- Play-offs: The eight teams will be drawn into four ties to play home-and-away two-legged matches to determine the last four qualified teams.

=== Tiebreakers ===
In the qualifying group stage, teams were ranked according to points (3 points for a win, 1 point for a draw, 0 points for a loss). Teams tied on points were ranked using the following tiebreaking criteria (Regulations Article 14):

1. Greater number of points in head-to-head matches among tied teams;
2. Greater goal difference in head-to-head matches among tied teams;
3. Greater number of goals scored in head-to-head matches among tied teams;
4. If a subset of teams were still tied after applying criteria 1–3, those criteria were reapplied exclusively to that subset. If they were still tied, then criteria 5–11 were applied.
5. Greater overall goal difference;
6. Greater overall number of goals scored;
7. Greater overall number of away goals scored;
8. Greater overall number of wins;
9. Greater overall number of away wins;
10. Lower disciplinary points total based on yellow and red cards received by players and team officials in all group matches:
  - Yellow card – 1 point;
  - Second yellow card in one match (indirect red card) – 3 points;
  - Direct red card – 3 points;
11. Position in the UEFA men's Under-21 national team rankings used for the group stage draw

To determine the best group stage runner-up, results against sixth-place teams were discarded and the following criteria applied (Regulations Article 15.02):

1. Greater overall number of points;
2. Greater overall goal difference;
3. Greater overall number of goals scored;
4. Greater overall number of wins;
5. Greater overall number of away wins;
6. Lower disciplinary points total based on yellow and red cards received by players and team officials in all group matches:
  - Yellow card – 1 point;
  - Second yellow card in one match (indirect red card) – 3 points;
  - Direct red card – 3 points;
7. Position in the UEFA men's Under-21 national team rankings used for the group stage draw

== Schedule ==
Stage	Draw date	FIFA International Dates
Qualifying group stage	6 February 2025	Matchday 1 (5–10 June 2025)
Qualifying group stage	6 February 2025	Matchday 2 (4–5 September 2025)
Qualifying group stage	6 February 2025	Matchday 3 (8–9 September 2025)
Qualifying group stage	6 February 2025	Matchday 4 (9–10 October 2025)
Qualifying group stage	6 February 2025	Matchday 5 (13–14 October 2025)
Qualifying group stage	6 February 2025	Matchday 6 (13–15 November 2025)
Qualifying group stage	6 February 2025	Matchday 7 (17–18 November 2025)
Qualifying group stage	6 February 2025	Matchday 8 (26–27 March 2026)
Qualifying group stage	6 February 2025	Matchday 9 (30–31 March 2026)
Qualifying group stage	6 February 2025	Matchday 10 (24–26 September 2026)
Qualifying group stage	6 February 2025	Matchday 11 (28 September – 1 October 2026)
Qualifying group stage	6 February 2025	Matchday 12 (5–6 October 2026)
Play-offs	9 October 2026	1st and 2nd legs (9–17 November 2026)

== Qualifying group stage ==
=== Draw ===
Final tournament co-hosts
Team
Albania
Serbia

Pot A Team Spain England Portugal Netherlands Germany France Ukraine Italy Denmark	Pot B Team Romania Switzerland Croatia Czech Republic Poland Norway Belgium Georgia Republic of Ireland	Pot C Team Slovenia Finland Sweden Austria Slovakia Greece Iceland Hungary Bulgaria
Pot D Team Scotland Wales Israel North Macedonia Turkey Kosovo Northern Ireland Faroe Islands Moldova	Pot E Team Belarus Montenegro Bosnia and Herzegovina Cyprus Latvia Lithuania Kazakhstan Azerbaijan Luxembourg	Pot F Team Estonia Malta Armenia Andorra Gibraltar San Marino

Each group contained one team from each of Pots A–F (Pots A–E for a five-team group). Based on the previous decisions taken by the UEFA Executive Committee and the UEFA Emergency Panel, four pairs of teams were not drawn in the same group.

- Armenia and Azerbaijan
- Gibraltar and Spain
- Bosnia and Herzegovina and Kosovo
- Belarus and Ukraine

=== Groups ===
==== Group A ====
Pos	Team	Pld	W	D	L	GF	GA	GD	Pts	Qualification	Spain	Finland	Romania	Kosovo	Cyprus	San Marino
1	Spain	10	9	0	1	47	5	+42	27	Final tournament	—	2–1	7–1	2–0	3–0	7–0
2	Finland	10	7	2	1	34	7	+27	23	Play-offs	2–1	—	2–0	0–0	3–0	7–0
3	Romania	10	5	1	4	12	13	−1	16		0–2	0–2	—	0–0	2–0	3–0
4	Kosovo	10	4	3	3	21	11	+10	15		1–3	4–4	0–1	—	2–1	7–0
5	Cyprus	10	2	0	8	8	29	−21	6		0–7	0–5	0–3	0–4	—	2–0
6	San Marino	10	0	0	10	0	57	−57	0		0–13	0–8	0–2	0–3	0–5	—

Source: UEFA

==== Group B ====
Pos	Team	Pld	W	D	L	GF	GA	GD	Pts	Qualification	Portugal	Czech Republic	Scotland	Bulgaria	Azerbaijan	Gibraltar
1	Portugal	10	8	1	1	35	2	+33	25	Final tournament	—	2–0	3–0	3–0	5–0	4–0
2	Czech Republic	10	5	3	2	17	6	+11	18	Play-offs	0–0	—	2–0	1–0	5–0	5–0
3	Scotland	10	5	2	3	25	12	+13	17		0–2	0–0	—	1–0	5–2	12–0
4	Bulgaria	10	4	2	4	9	10	−1	14		2–1	2–1	0–2	—	0–0	3–0
5	Azerbaijan	10	2	4	4	11	24	−13	10		0–4	1–1	3–3	1–1	—	3–0
6	Gibraltar	10	0	0	10	1	44	−43	0		0–11	1–2	0–2	0–1	0–1	—

Source: UEFA

==== Group C ====
Pos	Team	Pld	W	D	L	GF	GA	GD	Pts	Qualification	France	Iceland	Switzerland	Faroe Islands	Luxembourg	Estonia
1	France	10	8	2	0	34	8	+26	26	Final tournament	—	2–1	7–1	1–0	3–2	6–1
2	Iceland	10	5	3	2	22	11	+11	18	Play-offs	1–1	—	5–1	1–2	2–1	6–2
3	Switzerland	10	5	2	3	17	17	0	17		1–1	0–0	—	1–0	5–0	2–1
4	Faroe Islands	10	4	0	6	8	17	−9	12		0–6	0–2	1–3	—	0–1	2–1
5	Luxembourg	10	3	1	6	13	22	−9	10		1–5	1–3	2–1	0–1	—	3–0
6	Estonia	10	0	2	8	9	28	−19	2		0–2	1–1	0–2	1–2	2–2	—

Source: UEFA

==== Group D ====
Pos	Team	Pld	W	D	L	GF	GA	GD	Pts	Qualification	England	Ireland	Slovakia	Moldova	Andorra	Kazakhstan
1	England	10	7	2	1	23	7	+16	23	Final tournament	—	2–0	0–0	4–1	1–0	4–2
2	Republic of Ireland	10	6	2	2	16	14	+2	20 (Note: Head-to-head points: Republic of Ireland 4, Slovakia 1.)	Play-offs	3–1	—	2–2	1–1	1–0	4–3
3	Slovakia	10	6	2	2	17	13	+4	20		0–4	0–2	—	2–0	3–0	2–1
4	Moldova	10	2	3	5	12	19	−7	9		0–4	1–2	2–3	—	3–0	3–2
5	Andorra	10	2	2	6	7	12	−5	8		1–1	4–0	1–2	0–0	—	1–0
6	Kazakhstan	10	1	1	8	11	21	−10	4		0–2	0–1	1–3	1–1	1–0	—

Source: UEFA

==== Group E ====
Pos	Team	Pld	W	D	L	GF	GA	GD	Pts	Qualification	Italy	Poland	Sweden	Montenegro	North Macedonia	Armenia
1	Italy	10	9	0	1	32	7	+25	27 (Note: Tied on head-to-head points (3). Head-to-head goal difference: Italy +3, Poland −3.)	Final tournament	—	6–2	4–0	2–1	4–0	5–1
2	Poland	10	9	0	1	28	8	+20	27	Final tournament	2–1	—	3–0	2–0	3–0	4–1
3	Sweden	10	4	1	5	12	22	−10	13		0–4	0–6	—	2–2	2–0	3–0
4	Montenegro	10	3	3	4	13	16	−3	12		1–4	0–1	2–0	—	3–2	1–1
5	North Macedonia	10	2	1	7	8	20	−12	7		0–1	0–1	1–4	1–1	—	2–1
6	Armenia	10	0	1	9	5	25	−20	1		0–1	0–4	0–1	1–2	0–2	—

Source: UEFA

==== Group F ====
Pos	Team	Pld	W	D	L	GF	GA	GD	Pts	Qualification	Germany	Greece		Georgia	Latvia	Malta
1	Germany	10	9	0	1	32	5	+27	27 (Note: Tied on head-to-head points (3). Head-to-head goal difference: Germany +1, Greece −1.)	Final tournament	—	2–3	3–0	2–0	5–0	6–0
2	Greece	10	9	0	1	29	6	+23	27	Play-offs	0–2	—	4–0	3–0	4–2	5–0
3	Northern Ireland	10	4	2	4	13	13	0	14		1–2	0–1	—	1–1	1–0	2–0
4	Georgia	10	2	4	4	13	15	−2	10		0–2	0–3	1–1	—	1–1	4–1
5	Latvia	10	2	2	6	8	20	−12	8		0–4	0–1	1–3	1–1	—	2–0
6	Malta	10	0	0	10	2	38	−36	0		1–4	0–5	0–4	0–5	0–1	—

Source: UEFA

==== Group G ====
Pos	Team	Pld	W	D	L	GF	GA	GD	Pts	Qualification	Norway	Netherlands	Israel	Bosnia and Herzegovina	Slovenia
1	Norway	8	5	2	1	19	6	+13	17	Final tournament	—	3–2	1–1	6–1	5–0
2	Netherlands	8	3	3	2	15	10	+5	12	Play-offs	0–0	—	2–2	4–0	2–0
3	Israel	8	2	5	1	10	10	0	11		0–3	3–1	—	0–0	1–1
4	Bosnia and Herzegovina	8	1	4	3	3	11	−8	7		0–1	0–0	0–0	—	0–0
5	Slovenia	8	1	2	5	7	17	−10	5		2–0	2–4	2–3	0–2	—

Source: UEFA

==== Group H ====
Pos	Team	Pld	W	D	L	GF	GA	GD	Pts	Qualification	Croatia	Turkey	Ukraine	Hungary	Lithuania
1	Croatia	8	6	1	1	15	3	+12	19	Final tournament	—	3–0	1–0	3–1	4–0
2	Turkey	8	3	4	1	9	8	+1	13	Play-offs	1–1	—	1–0	0–0	2–0
3	Ukraine	8	3	3	2	13	9	+4	12		1–0	2–2	—	3–3	1–1
4	Hungary	8	1	4	3	9	13	−4	7		0–2	1–1	1–2	—	2–1
5	Lithuania	8	0	2	6	4	17	−13	2		0–1	1–2	0–4	1–1	—

Source: UEFA

==== Group I ====
Pos	Team	Pld	W	D	L	GF	GA	GD	Pts	Qualification	Belgium	Denmark	Austria	Wales	Belarus
1	Belgium	8	5	2	1	13	2	+11	17	Final tournament	—	2–0	1–0	1–0	1–0
2	Denmark	8	4	3	1	15	6	+9	15	Play-offs	0–0	—	1–1	4–0	2–0
3	Austria	8	4	2	2	15	9	+6	14		1–0	1–1	—	0–2	2–1
4	Wales	8	2	0	6	7	28	−21	6		0–7	2–6	1–7	—	2–0
5	Belarus	8	1	1	6	7	12	−5	4		1–1	0–1	2–3	3–0	—

Source: UEFA

=== Ranking of second-placed teams ===
Due to differing group sizes, results against sixth-place teams were not considered when ranking the group runners-up. The highest-ranked group runner-up qualified directly for the final tournament, while the other teams entered the play-offs.

Pos	Grp	Team	Pld	W	D	L	GF	GA	GD	Pts	Qualification
1	E	Poland	8	7	0	1	20	7	+13	21	Final tournament
2	F	Greece	8	7	0	1	19	6	+13	21	Play-offs
3	A	Finland	8	5	2	1	19	7	+12	17	Play-offs
4	I	Denmark	8	4	3	1	15	6	+9	15	Play-offs
5	C	Iceland	8	4	2	2	15	8	+7	14	Play-offs
6	D	Republic of Ireland	8	4	2	2	11	11	0	14	Play-offs
7	H	Turkey	8	3	4	1	9	8	+1	13	Play-offs
8	G	Netherlands	8	3	3	2	15	10	+5	12	Play-offs
9	B	Czech Republic	8	3	3	2	10	5	+5	12	Play-offs

Source: UEFA
Rules for classification: 1) points; 2) goal difference; 3) goals scored; 4) away goals scored; 5) wins; 6) away wins; 7) disciplinary points; 8) coefficient ranking.

== Play-offs ==
The draw for the play-offs was made on 9 October 2026 in Nyon, Switzerland. The play-off draw was made without seeding.

Team 1	Agg.	Team 2	1st leg	2nd leg
Denmark	3–5	Netherlands	0–3	3–2
Iceland	2–2 (4–5 p)	Greece	1–1	1–1 (a.e.t.)
Finland	3–2	Republic of Ireland	1–0	2–2 (a.e.t.)
Turkey	1–2	Czech Republic	0–1	1–1

== Qualified teams ==
The following teams qualified for the final tournament.

Note: All appearance statistics include only U-21 era (since 1978).

Team	Qualification method	Date of qualification	Appearance(s)				Previous best performance (Note: Italic text indicates hosts of that edition.)
Team	Qualification method	Date of qualification	Total	First	Last	Streak	Previous best performance
Serbia	Co-hosts	4 February 2025	12th (Note: Including four appearances as Yugoslavia and two as Serbia and Montenegro. Their previous best performance as Serbia was runners-up (2007).)	1978	2019	1	Champions (1978) (as Yugoslavia)
Albania	Co-hosts	4 February 2025	2nd	1984		1	Quarter-finals (1984)
Croatia	Group H winners	26 September 2026	6th (10th incl. Yugoslavia)	2000	2023	1	Quarter-finals (2021)
Norway	Group G winners	29 September 2026	4th	1998	2023	1	Semi-finals (1998, 2013)
Portugal	Group B winners	30 September 2026	12th	1994	2025	4	Runners-up (1994, 2015, 2021)
England	Group D winners	2 October 2026	19th	1978	2025	11	Champions (1982, 1984, 2023, 2025)
France	Group C winners	3 October 2026	13th	1982	2025	5	Champions (1988)
Italy	Group E winners	5 October 2026	24th	1978	2025	8	Champions (1992, 1994, 1996, 2000, 2004)
Germany	Group F winners	6 October 2026	16th	1982	2025	8	Champions (2009, 2017, 2021)
Poland	Best runner-up	6 October 2026	9th	1982	2025	2	Quarter-finals (1982, 1984, 1986, 1992, 1994)
Belgium	Group I winners	6 October 2026	5th	2002	2023	1	Semi-finals (2007)
Spain	Group A winners	6 October 2026	18th	1982	2025	6	Champions (1986, 1998, 2011, 2013, 2019)
Greece	Play-offs winner	16 November 2026	5th	1988	2002	1	Runners-up (1988, 1998)
Netherlands	Play-offs winner	17 November 2026	11th	1988	2025	4	Champions (2006, 2007)
Czech Republic	Play-offs winner	17 November 2026	11th (17th incl. Czechoslovakia)	1999	2025	4	Champions (2002)
Finland	Play-offs winner	17 November 2026	3rd	2009	2025	2	Group stage (2009, 2025)

== Top goalscorers ==
There were 784 goals scored in 248 matches, for an average of 3.16 goals per match.

10 goals

- (Germany national under-21 football team) Nicolò Tresoldi

8 goals

- (France national under-21 football team) Mathys Tel
- (Iceland national under-21 football team) Daníel Guðjohnsen
- (Spain national under-21 football team) Pablo García

7 goals

- (Norway national under-21 football team) Sindre Walle Egeli
- (Spain national under-21 football team) Gonzalo García

5 goals

- (Belgium national under-21 football team) Norman Bassette
- (Czech Republic national under-21 football team) Lukáš Mašek
- (Denmark national under-21 football team) Conrad Harder
- (England national under-21 football team) Divin Mubama
- (Finland national under-21 football team) Marius Söderbäck
- (France national under-21 football team) Steve Ngoura
- (Greece national under-21 football team) Georgios Koutsias
- (Portugal national under-21 football team) Rodrigo Mora
- (Scotland national under-21 football team) James Wilson
- (Spain national under-21 football team) Carlos Espí

4 goals

- (Croatia national under-21 football team) Leon Grgić
- (Croatia national under-21 football team) Adriano Jagušić
- (England national under-21 football team) Ethan Nwaneri
- (Finland national under-21 football team) Onni Helén
- (Finland national under-21 football team) Otto Ruoppi
- (Finland national under-21 football team) Matias Siltanen
- (Finland national under-21 football team) Adrian Svanbäck
- (Greece national under-21 football team) Konstantinos Kostoulas
- (Greece national under-21 football team) Stefanos Tzimas
- (Hungary national under-21 football team) Máté Tuboly
- (Iceland national under-21 football team) Benoný Andrésson
- (Italy national under-21 football team) Francesco Camarda
- (Italy national under-21 football team) Seydou Fini
- (Italy national under-21 football team) Luca Koleosho
- (Italy national under-21 football team) Luca Lipani
- (Italy national under-21 football team) Cher Ndour
- (Italy national under-21 football team) Niccolò Pisilli
- (Montenegro national under-21 football team) Balša Mrvaljević
- (Netherlands national under-21 football team) Ernest Poku
- (Poland national under-21 football team) Antoni Kozubal
- (Poland national under-21 football team) Oskar Pietuszewski
- (Portugal national under-21 football team) Gustavo Varela
- (Republic of Ireland national under-21 football team) Tommy Lonergan
- (Scotland national under-21 football team) Emilio Lawrence
- (Slovakia national under-21 football team) Mário Sauer
- (Spain national under-21 football team) Jan Virgili
- (Switzerland national under-21 football team) Labinot Bajrami
- (Switzerland national under-21 football team) Liam Chipperfield
- (Turkey national under-21 football team) Emirhan İlkhan

Below are goalscorer lists for all groups and play-offs:

- Group A
- Group B
- Group C
- Group D
- Group E
- Group F
- Group G
- Group H
- Group I
- Play-offs
