= Bosnia and Herzegovina national under-21 football team =

National association football team

Bosnia and Herzegovina
- Nickname(s): Zlatni ljiljani (The Golden Lilies); Zmajevi (Dragons)
- Association: Football Association of Bosnia and Herzegovina (N/FSBiH)
- Confederation: UEFA (Europe)
- Head coach: Branislav Krunić
- Captain: Rotation
- Most caps: Srđan Grahovac (23)
- Top scorer: Nemanja Bilbija (9)
- Home stadium: N/FSBiH Training Center
- FIFA code: BIH
First colours	Second colours

First international
- Greece 1–0 Bosnia and Herzegovina (31 August 1996)

Biggest win
- Bosnia and Herzegovina 6–0 Liechtenstein (28 March 2017)

Biggest defeat
- Norway 6–1 Bosnia and Herzegovina (29 September 2026); Bosnia and Herzegovina 1–6 Spain (14 November 2013); Croatia 6–1 Bosnia and Herzegovina (5 September 1997)

Bosnia and Herzegovina U21 national football team is made up by players who are 21 years old or younger and represents Bosnia and Herzegovina in international football matches at this age level.

The national U21 team has never qualified for a major tournament, but has had a couple of near misses, including in 2006, when they played Czech Republic during the 2007 UEFA European Under-21 Football Championship qualification playoffs but lost on aggregate. The Czechs won 2–1 at home, while the result was a 1–1 draw in Sarajevo.

== Competitive record ==
=== UEFA European U21 Championship record ===
UEFA European U21 Championship									Qualification						
Year	Round	Pld	W	D	L	GF	GA	GD	Pld	W	D	L	GF	GA	GD
(Romania) 1998	Did not qualify								8	1	2	5	6	18	−12
(Slovakia) 2000	Did not qualify								10	2	1	7	11	24	−13
(Switzerland) 2002	Did not qualify								8	0	1	7	5	17	−12
(Germany) 2004	Did not qualify								8	4	1	3	6	10	−4
(Portugal) 2006	Did not qualify								10	3	1	6	17	20	−3
(Netherlands) 2007	Did not qualify								4	1	2	1	6	6	=0
(Sweden) 2009	Did not qualify								8	1	1	6	7	17	−10
(Denmark) 2011	Did not qualify								8	2	2	4	4	8	−4
(Israel) 2013	Did not qualify								10	6	2	2	25	12	+13
(Czech Republic) 2015	Did not qualify								8	2	0	6	10	22	−12
(Poland) 2017	Did not qualify								8	0	3	5	2	13	−11
(Italy) (San Marino) 2019	Did not qualify								10	6	0	4	24	11	+13
(Hungary) (Slovenia) 2021	Did not qualify								8	3	2	3	9	7	+2
(Romania) (Georgia (country)) 2023	Did not qualify								10	3	2	5	9	16	−7
(Slovakia) 2025	Did not qualify								8	1	0	7	5	17	−12
(Albania) (Serbia) 2027	Did not qualify								8	1	4	3	3	11	−8
Total	0/16	0	0	0	0	0	0	0	134	36	24	74	149	229	–80

== 2027 UEFA European U21 Championship Qualifiers ==
Pos	Team	Pld	W	D	L	GF	GA	GD	Pts	Qualification	Norway	Netherlands	Israel	Bosnia and Herzegovina	Slovenia
1	Norway	8	5	2	1	19	6	+13	17	Final tournament	—	3–2	1–1	6–1	5–0
2	Netherlands	8	3	3	2	15	10	+5	12	Play-offs	0–0	—	2–2	4–0	2–0
3	Israel	8	2	5	1	10	10	0	11		0–3	3–1	—	0–0	1–1
4	Bosnia and Herzegovina	8	1	4	3	3	11	−8	7		0–1	0–0	0–0	—	0–0
5	Slovenia	8	1	2	5	7	17	−10	5		2–0	2–4	2–3	0–2	—

Source: UEFA

5 September 2025	Bosnia and Herzegovina	0–0	Israel	Stadion pod Bijelim Brijegom, Mostar
18:00		Report		Referee: Márton Rúsz (Hungary)

10 October 2025	Bosnia and Herzegovina	0–0	Netherlands	Stadion Grbavica, Sarajevo
18:00		Report		Attendance: 210; Referee: Szabolcs Kovacs (Romania)

14 October 2025	Slovenia	0–2	Bosnia and Herzegovina	Stadion Z'dežele, Celje
18:00		Report	Kujović 64'; Keranović 82'	Referee: Sam Barrott (England)

18 November 2025	Bosnia and Herzegovina	0–1	Norway	Stadion Grbavica, Sarajevo
18:00		Report	Jurkas 70' (o.g.)	Attendance: 318; Referee: Walter Altmann (Austria)

27 March 2026	Bosnia and Herzegovina	0–0	Slovenia	Stadion Grbavica, Sarajevo
15:00		Report		Attendance: 220; Referee: Ante Čulina (Croatia)

31 March 2026	Israel	0–0	Bosnia and Herzegovina	BSC Stadium, Budaörs (Hungary) (Note: Due to the Gaza war, Israel are required to play their home matches at neutral venues until further notice.)
18:00		Report		Referee: Matthew De Gabriele (Malta)

29 September 2026	Norway	6–1	Bosnia and Herzegovina	Viking Stadion, Stavanger
18:00	Egeli 14', 45', 79'; Ødegård 77', 87'; Hjertø-Dahl 84'	Report	Deket 7'	Attendance: 1,473; Referee: Ryan Lee (Scotland)

6 October 2026	Netherlands	4–0	Bosnia and Herzegovina	De Vijverberg, Doetinchem
18:45	Sliti 70'; Zeefuik 79', 90+1'; Haen 84'	Report		Attendance: 5,018; Referee: Dalibor Černý (Czech Republic)

== Personnel ==
=== Current technical staff ===
Position	Name
Head coach	(Bosnia and Herzegovina) Branislav Krunić
Assistant coaches	(Bosnia and Herzegovina) Sejad Salihović
Assistant coaches	(Bosnia and Herzegovina) Samir Muratović
Assistant coaches	(Bosnia and Herzegovina) Draženko Bogdan
Assistant coaches	(Bosnia and Herzegovina) Amir Spahić
Goalkeeping coach	(Bosnia and Herzegovina) Zoran Sofrenić

=== Coaching history ===
Dates	Name
2025–present	(Bosnia and Herzegovina) Branislav Krunić
2024–2025	(Bosnia and Herzegovina) Vinko Marinović
2022–2024	(Bosnia and Herzegovina) Igor Janković
2020–2022	(Bosnia and Herzegovina) Slobodan Starčević
2017–2019	(Bosnia and Herzegovina) Vinko Marinović
2014–2016	(Bosnia and Herzegovina) Darko Nestorović
2011–2014	(Bosnia and Herzegovina) Vlado Jagodić
2008–2011	(Bosnia and Herzegovina) Branimir Tulić
2007–2008	(Bosnia and Herzegovina) Nikola Nikić
2002–2007	(Bosnia and Herzegovina) Ibrahim Zukanović
2001–2002	(Bosnia and Herzegovina) Admir Smajić
1998–2001	(Bosnia and Herzegovina) Šener Bajramović
1998	(Bosnia and Herzegovina) Mišo Smajlović
1996–1998	(Bosnia and Herzegovina) Nermin Hadžiahmetović

== Players ==
=== Current squad ===
The following players were called up for the friendly matches against Montenegro on 13 and 16 November 2026.
Caps and goals correct as of 6 October 2026 after the game against Netherlands.

No.	Pos.	Player	Date of birth (age)	Caps	Goals	Club
	GK	Amil Šiljević	19 January 2007 (age 19)	2	0	(German Football Association) Eintracht Frankfurt
	GK	Dino Kaiser	9 February 2007 (age 19)	0	0	(The Football Association) Uxbridge
	DF	Filip Taraba	29 June 2006 (age 20)	10	0	(Croatian Football Federation) Rudeš
	DF	Amar Ibrišimović	17 April 2007 (age 19)	9	0	(Football Association of Bosnia and Herzegovina) Željezničar
	DF	Haris Berbić	12 April 2006 (age 20)	6	0	(Football Association of the Czech Republic) Slovan Liberec
	DF	Eman Košpo	17 May 2007 (age 19)	4	0	(Italian Football Federation) Mantova 1911
	DF	Ajdin Beganović	18 May 2006 (age 20)	0	0	(Football Association of Bosnia and Herzegovina) Sloboda Tuzla
	DF	Matija Glogovac	4 August 2006 (age 20)	0	0	(Football Association of Bosnia and Herzegovina) Sarajevo
	DF	Matej Hrkać	25 August 2007 (age 19)	0	0	(Football Association of Bosnia and Herzegovina) Široki Brijeg
	DF	Miljan Kecman	12 June 2009 (age 17)	0	0	(Football Association of Bosnia and Herzegovina) Laktaši
	DF	Hamza Redžić	9 June 2007 (age 19)	0	0	(Football Association of Serbia) Bor 1919
	MF	Nedim Keranović	9 November 2006 (age 20)	9	1	(Football Association of Bosnia and Herzegovina) BSK Banja Luka
	MF	Borna Filipović	5 June 2006 (age 20)	2	0	(Football Association of Bosnia and Herzegovina) Posušje
	MF	Anan Baltić	12 May 2008 (age 18)	0	0	(Football Association of Bosnia and Herzegovina) Travnik
	MF	Mahir Bešić	23 March 2007 (age 19)	0	0	(Football Association of Bosnia and Herzegovina) Velež Mostar
	MF	Admir Gojak	19 August 2007 (age 19)	0	0	(Football Association of Bosnia and Herzegovina) Željezničar
	MF	Danilo Karanović	15 June 2008 (age 18)	0	0	(Football Association of Serbia) Ušće Novi Beograd
	MF	Ognjen Klenpić	12 February 2006 (age 20)	0	0	(Football Association of Bosnia and Herzegovina) Radnik Bijeljina
	MF	Rajan Žlibanović	7 December 2006 (age 19)	0	0	(Austrian Football Association) Kapfenberger SV
	FW	Stefan Marčetić	2 December 2006 (age 19)	6	0	(Football Association of Bosnia and Herzegovina) BSK Banja Luka
	FW	Amar Milak	25 May 2006 (age 20)	4	1	(Football Association of Bosnia and Herzegovina) Borac Banja Luka
	FW	Antonio Arapović	24 April 2007 (age 19)	0	0	(Football Association of Bosnia and Herzegovina) Zrinjski Mostar
	FW	Arif Kovač	8 September 2006 (age 20)	0	0	(United States Soccer Federation) Atlanta United 2
	FW	Andrej Mićić	21 January 2007 (age 19)	0	0	(Football Association of Slovenia) Nafta 1903

=== Recent call-ups ===
The following eligible players have been called up for the team within the last twelve months:

Pos.	Player	Date of birth (age)	Caps	Goals	Club	Latest call-up
GK	Sanin Mušija	29 June 2005 (age 21)	0	0	(Bosnia and Herzegovina) Sarajevo	v. Netherlands, 6 October 2026
GK	Arman Šutković	5 March 2005 (age 21)	0	0	(Bosnia and Herzegovina) Čelik Zenica	v. Netherlands, 6 October 2026
GK	Mladen Jurkas ^{PRO}	7 October 2007 (age 19)	4	0	(Bosnia and Herzegovina) Borac Banja Luka	v. Norway, 29 September 2026
GK	Tarik Karić	19 September 2005 (age 21)	5	0	(Poland) Raków Częstochowa	v. Israel, 31 March 2026
GK	Ivano Doko	15 April 2008 (age 18)	0	0	(Bosnia and Herzegovina) Brotnjo	v. Israel, 31 March 2026
DF	Senad Mustafić	7 September 2005 (age 21)	12	0	(Croatia) Osijek	v. Netherlands, 6 October 2026
DF	Nidal Čelik	17 July 2006 (age 20)	9	0	(France) Lens	v. Netherlands, 6 October 2026
DF	Božidar Dimitrić	11 March 2008 (age 18)	1	0	(Bosnia and Herzegovina) Radnik Bijeljina	v. Netherlands, 6 October 2026
DF	Viktor Grbić	15 March 2004 (age 22)	0	0	(Bosnia and Herzegovina) Zrinjski Mostar	v. Netherlands, 6 October 2026
DF	Nermin Mujkić	8 February 2004 (age 22)	7	0	(United Arab Emirates) Al Jazira	v. Israel, 31 March 2026
DF	Anes Čardaklija	5 July 2005 (age 21)	2	0	(Sweden) GAIS	v. Israel, 31 March 2026
DF	Arjan Malić ^{PRO}	28 August 2005 (age 21)	2	0	(Austria) Sturm Graz	v. Israel, 31 March 2026
MF	Muhamed Buljubašić	4 July 2004 (age 22)	15	1	(Turkey) Esenler Erokspor	v. Netherlands, 6 October 2026
MF	Anes Krdžalić	28 August 2004 (age 22)	15	0	(Spain) Tenerife	v. Netherlands, 6 October 2026
MF	Aldin Mešić	4 February 2004 (age 22)	8	0	(Bosnia and Herzegovina) Velež Mostar	v. Netherlands, 6 October 2026
MF	Albin Omić	17 January 2004 (age 22)	8	0	(Bosnia and Herzegovina) Čelik Zenica	v. Netherlands, 6 October 2026
MF	Emin Kujović	29 September 2004 (age 22)	7	1	(Hungary) Zalaegerszegi	v. Netherlands, 6 October 2026
MF	Marko Matić	4 December 2005 (age 20)	1	0	(Bosnia and Herzegovina) Široki Brijeg	v. Netherlands, 6 October 2026
MF	Antonio Ilić	25 May 2005 (age 21)	0	0	(Bosnia and Herzegovina) Zrinjski Mostar	v. Netherlands, 6 October 2026
MF	Darko Savić	3 June 2008 (age 18)	0	0	(Bosnia and Herzegovina) Sloga Doboj	v. Netherlands, 6 October 2026
MF	Matej Šakota	16 August 2004 (age 22)	6	0	(Qatar) Umm Salal	v. Israel, 31 March 2026
MF	Benjamin Džanović	11 August 2007 (age 19)	1	0	(Austria) Admira Wacker	v. Israel, 31 March 2026
MF	Ognjen Šešlak	13 June 2006 (age 20)	0	0	(Bosnia and Herzegovina) Sloga Doboj	v. Israel, 31 March 2026
FW	Hamza Jaganjac	27 February 2004 (age 22)	7	1	(Croatia) Istra 1961	v. Netherlands, 6 October 2026
FW	Matej Deket ^{PRO}	1 October 2009 (age 17)	4	1	(Bosnia and Herzegovina) Borac Banja Luka	v. Netherlands, 6 October 2026
FW	Pavle Đajić	3 August 2006 (age 20)	4	0	(Bosnia and Herzegovina) Borac Banja Luka	v. Netherlands, 6 October 2026
^{INJ} Withdrawn due to injury.^{PRE} Preliminary squad.^{SUS} Suspended.^{WD} Withdrew.^{PRO} Promoted to senior team.

== See also ==
- UEFA European Under-21 Championship
- Bosnia and Herzegovina national football team
- Bosnia and Herzegovina national under-19 football team
- Bosnia and Herzegovina national under-18 football team
- Bosnia and Herzegovina national under-17 football team
- Bosnia and Herzegovina national under-15 football team
