= Netherlands national under-21 football team =

National U–21 association football team

Netherlands U21
- Nickname: Jong Oranje
- Association: Koninklijke Nederlandse Voetbalbond
- Confederation: UEFA (Europe)
- Head coach: Michael Reiziger
- Captain: Devyne Rensch
- Most caps: Arnold Bruggink & Leroy Fer (31)
- Top scorer: Klaas-Jan Huntelaar (18)
First colours	Second colours

UEFA U-21 Championship
- Appearances: 10 (first in 1988)
- Best result: Winners (2006, 2007)

The Netherlands national under-21 football team is the national under-21 team of the Netherlands and is controlled by the Royal Dutch Football Association. The team competes in the European Under-21 Championship, held every two years.

Following the realignment of UEFA's youth competitions in 1976, the Dutch Under-21 team was formed. The team did not have a very good record, failing to qualify for nine of the fifteen tournaments. The team did not enter for the 1978 competition, but since then has reached the semi-finals twice, and qualified for the last eight on three other occasions.

Since the under-21 competition rules insist that players must be 21 or under at the start of a two-year competition, technically it is an U-23 competition. For this reason, the Netherlands' record in the preceding U-23 competitions is also shown. The first competitive match was in the "Under-23 Challenge", a match which they lost. The team qualified for the last eight of each of the three U-23 tournaments.

In 2006 the Netherlands national under-21 football team of coach Foppe de Haan won the 2006 European Under-21 Championship. Klaas-Jan Huntelaar became top scorer and player of the tournament with four goals, and also broke the all-time goalscoring record of 15 goals previously held by Roy Makaay and Arnold Jan Bruggink, in his last match with the team as he pushed this record to eighteen goals. The following year, Netherlands national under-21 football team successfully defended their title by winning the 2007 European Under-21 Championship in the final against Serbia with 4–1. Maceo Rigters was the top scorer of the competition with four goals and Royston Drenthe was the Player of the Tournament. The win meant that the Netherlands qualified for the 2008 Summer Olympics in Beijing. The team failed to qualify for the 2009 European Under-21 Championship, after losing out to Switzerland in their final qualifying match.

== Competitive record ==
=== UEFA U-23 Championship record ===
The Netherlands were randomly chosen to play against Bulgaria for the title in a one-off match in Sofia, which the Netherlands lost.

- 17 April 1968: Bulgaria 3–1 Netherlands.

=== UEFA U-23 Championship Record ===
UEFA U-23 Championship Record									Qualification record					
Year	Round	Position	Pld	W	D*	L	GF	GA	Pld	W	D*	L	GF	GA
1972	Quarter-finals	?	3	0	1	2	4	2	4	2	1	1	9	7
1974	Quarter-finals	?	2	1	0	1	4	4	2	2	0	0	4	1
1976	Semi finals	?	4	2	0	2	3	5	4	3	1	0	10	3
Total	0 titles	3/3	9	3	1	5	11	11	10	7	2	1	23	11

(*) Denotes draws including knockout matches decided via penalty shoot-out.

=== UEFA U-21 Championship Record ===
UEFA U-21 Championship Record										Qualification record					
Year	Round	Position	Pld	W	D*	L	GF	GA	Squad	Pld	W	D*	L	GF	GA
1978	did not enter									did not enter					
1980	did not qualify									4	0	1	3	4	8
1982	did not qualify									4	2	0	2	4	4
1984	did not qualify									4	1	2	1	7	3
1986	did not qualify									6	4	1	1	11	3
1988	Semi-finals	3rd/4th	4	3	0	1	5	6	—	6	5	0	1	12	5
1990	did not qualify									6	1	2	3	6	9
1992	Quarter-finals	5th	2	1	0	1	2	2	—	6	4	2	0	20	4
1994	did not qualify									10	3	2	5	11	14
1996	did not qualify									10	6	2	2	23	9
1998	Fourth place	4th	3	1	0	2	2	2	Squad	8	6	1	1	26	5
2000	Group stage	6th	3	1	0	2	3	5	Squad	10	7	1	2	21	9
2002	did not qualify									10	5	3	2	22	10
2004	did not qualify									8	1	4	3	6	10
2006	Final	Champions	5	3	1	1	9	5	Squad	10	7	2	1	21	7
2007	Final	Champions	5	3	2	0	10	5	Squad	Qualified as hosts					
2009	did not qualify									8	5	1	2	10	3
2011	did not qualify									10	8	0	2	22	8
2013	Semi-finals	3rd/4th	4	2	0	2	8	7	Squad	10	8	1	1	25	3
2015	did not qualify									10	5	1	4	26	13
2017	did not qualify									8	4	2	2	15	10
2019	did not qualify									10	5	3	2	21	6
2021	Semi-finals	3rd/4th	5	2	2	1	11	6	Squad	10	9	0	1	46	5
2023	Group stage	9th	3	0	3	0	2	2	Squad	10	8	2	0	32	3
2025	Semi-finals	3rd/4th	5	2	1	2	7	6	Squad	10	10	0	0	32	3
2027	qualified								Squad	12	4	3	3	20	13
Total	2 titles	10/25	39	18	9	12	59	40	—	200	118	36	44	443	167

(*) Denotes draws including knockout matches decided via penalty shoot-out.

=== Olympic Games ===
Summer Olympic record
Year	Round	Position	GP	W	D*	L	GS	GA
(Spain) 1992	Did not qualify							
(United States) 1996	Did not qualify							
(Australia) 2000	Did not qualify							
(Greece) 2004	Did not qualify							
(China) 2008	Quarter-finals	7th	4	1	2	1	4	4
(United Kingdom) 2012	Did not qualify							
(Brazil) 2016	Did not qualify							
(Japan) 2020	Did not qualify							
(France) 2024	Did not qualify							
Total	1/9	0 Medals	4	1	2	1	4	4

== Results and fixtures 2025–2027 ==
=== 2027 UEFA European Under-21 Championship ===
==== Qualification ====
Pos	Team	Pld	W	D	L	GF	GA	GD	Pts	Qualification	Norway	Netherlands	Israel	Bosnia and Herzegovina	Slovenia
1	Norway	8	5	2	1	19	6	+13	17	Final tournament	—	3–2	1–1	6–1	5–0
2	Netherlands	8	3	3	2	15	10	+5	12	Play-offs	0–0	—	2–2	4–0	2–0
3	Israel	8	2	5	1	10	10	0	11		0–3	3–1	—	0–0	1–1
4	Bosnia and Herzegovina	8	1	4	3	3	11	−8	7		0–1	0–0	0–0	—	0–0
5	Slovenia	8	1	2	5	7	17	−10	5		2–0	2–4	2–3	0–2	—

Source: UEFA
Rules for classification: Tiebreakers

== Players ==
=== Current squad ===
Players born on or after 1 January 2004 are eligible for the 2027 UEFA European Under-21 Championship.

The following players were named in the squad for the 2027 UEFA European Under-21 Championship qualification play-offs against Denmark on 13 and 17 November 2026 respectively. On 9 November, Wouter Goes and Rome-Jayden Owusu-Oduro left the squad due to injuries. They have been replaced by Thijmen Blokzijl and Joeri Heerkens respectively.

Caps and goals correct as of 6 October 2026, after the match against Bosnia and Herzegovina.

No.	Pos.	Player	Date of birth (age)	Caps	Goals	Club
	GK	Bernt Klaverboer	26 September 2005 (age 21)	5	0	(Royal Dutch Football Association) Heerenveen
	GK	Niek Schiks	3 February 2004 (age 22)	2	0	(Royal Dutch Football Association) RKC Waalwijk
	GK	Joeri Heerkens	8 May 2006 (age 20)	0	0	(Royal Dutch Football Association) Jong Ajax
	DF	Thijmen Blokzijl	25 February 2005 (age 21)	8	0	(Royal Dutch Football Association) Groningen
	DF	Mats Rots	11 March 2006 (age 20)	7	0	(German Football Association) TSG Hoffenheim
	DF	Elijah Dijkstra	5 August 2006 (age 20)	6	0	(Royal Dutch Football Association) AZ
	DF	Dies Janse	17 January 2006 (age 20)	5	0	(Royal Dutch Football Association) Ajax
	DF	Jorg Schreuders	9 September 2004 (age 22)	5	0	(Royal Dutch Football Association) Groningen
	DF	Givairo Read	2 June 2006 (age 20)	4	0	(Royal Dutch Football Association) Feyenoord
	DF	Marvin Young	2 October 2005 (age 21)	2	0	(Royal Dutch Football Association) Sparta Rotterdam
	DF	Ruud Nijstad	17 January 2008 (age 18)	0	0	(Royal Dutch Football Association) FC Twente
	DF	Aaron Bouwman	28 August 2007 (age 19)	0	0	(Royal Dutch Football Association) Ajax
	MF	Thom van Bergen	6 January 2004 (age 22)	19	4	(Royal Dutch Football Association) Groningen
	MF	Kees Smit	20 January 2006 (age 20)	6	1	(Royal Dutch Football Association) AZ
	MF	Dave Kwakman	7 August 2004 (age 22)	4	0	(Royal Dutch Football Association) AZ
	MF	Sean Steur	11 January 2008 (age 18)	3	0	(The Football Association) Newcastle United
	MF	Tygo Land	11 January 2006 (age 20)	2	0	(Royal Dutch Football Association) Groningen
	FW	Ernest Poku	28 January 2004 (age 22)	24	6	(Turkish Football Federation) Besiktas
	FW	Devin Haen	18 June 2004 (age 22)	6	3	(Royal Dutch Football Association) Willem II
	FW	Aymen Sliti	24 March 2006 (age 20)	4	1	(Royal Dutch Football Association) Excelsior
	FW	Don-Angelo Konadu	3 May 2006 (age 20)	3	0	(Royal Belgian Football Association) Lommel
	FW	Ro-Zangelo Daal	10 February 2004 (age 22)	3	0	(Royal Dutch Football Association) AZ
	FW	Jerayno Schaken	18 June 2009 (age 17)	0	0	(Royal Dutch Football Association) Feyenoord

=== Recent call ups ===
The following players have previously been called up to the Netherlands under-21 squad in the last year and remain eligible.

Pos.	Player	Date of birth (age)	Caps	Goals	Club	Latest call-up
GK	Rome-Jayden Owusu-Oduro	2 July 2004 (age 22)	8	0	(Netherlands) AZ	v. Bosnia and Herzegovina, 6 October 2026^{INJ}
GK	Tom de Graaff	10 December 2004 (age 21)	3	0	(Netherlands) PEC Zwolle	v. Belgium, 30 March 2026
DF	Sam de Grand	5 October 2004 (age 22)	2	0	(Belgium) Lommel	v. Belgium, 30 March 2026
DF	Tristan Gooijer	2 September 2004 (age 22)	1	0	(Belgium) Lommel	v. Belgium, 30 March 2026
DF	Lewis Schouten	4 February 2004 (age 22)	0	0	(Netherlands) AZ	v. Norway, 25 September 2026
DF	Rav van den Berg	7 July 2004 (age 22)	11	1	(Germany) FC Köln	v. Norway, 25 September 2026
DF	Wouter Goes	10 June 2004 (age 22)	11	0	(Netherlands) AZ	v. Norway, 25 September 2026^{INJ}
DF	Jozhua Vertrouwd	21 August 2004 (age 22)	1	0	(Spain) Rayo Vallecano	v. Israel, 18 November 2025
MF	Lamare Bogarde	5 January 2004 (age 22)	4	0	(England) Aston Villa	v. Belgium, 30 March 2026
MF	Sami Ouaissa	2 October 2004 (age 22)	3	0	(Netherlands) PSV	v. Belgium, 30 March 2026
MF	Ezechiel Banzuzi	16 February 2005 (age 21)	11	1	(Germany) RB Leipzig	v. Belgium, 30 March 2026^{COD}
MF	Isaac Babadi	6 April 2005 (age 21)	6	2	(Belgium) Royal Antwerp	v. Israel, 18 November 2025
FW	Lequincio Zeefuik	26 November 2004 (age 21)	5	2	(Netherlands) Fortuna Sittard	v. Bosnia and Herzegovina, 6 October 2026
^{INJ} Withdrew due to injury.^{PRE} Preliminary squad.^{SEN} Accepted call up to senior team.^{MOR} Chose to represent Morocco.^{COD} Chose to represent DR Congo.

=== Overage players in Olympic Games ===
Tournament	Player 1	Player 2	Player 3
2008	Kew Jaliens (DF)	Gerald Sibon (FW)	Roy Makaay (FW)

=== Notable players from under-21 football team ===
- Jo Bonfrere
- Roy Makaay
- Arnold Bruggink
- Wilfred Bouma
- Peter Wisgerhof
- Victor Sikora
- Mark van Bommel
- Jan Vennegoor of Hesselink
- Dirk Kuyt
- Kenneth Vermeer
- Gijs Luirink
- Nicky Hofs
- Stijn Schaars
- Urby Emanuelson
- Romeo Castelen
- Klaas-Jan Huntelaar
- Robin van Persie
- Boy Waterman
- Ron Vlaar
- Ryan Donk
- Gianni Zuiverloon
- Hedwiges Maduro
- Otman Bakkal
- Maceo Rigters
- Ryan Babel
- Royston Drenthe
- Tim Krul
- Erik Pieters

== Individual all-time records ==
Still active players are highlighted

=== Most capped players ===
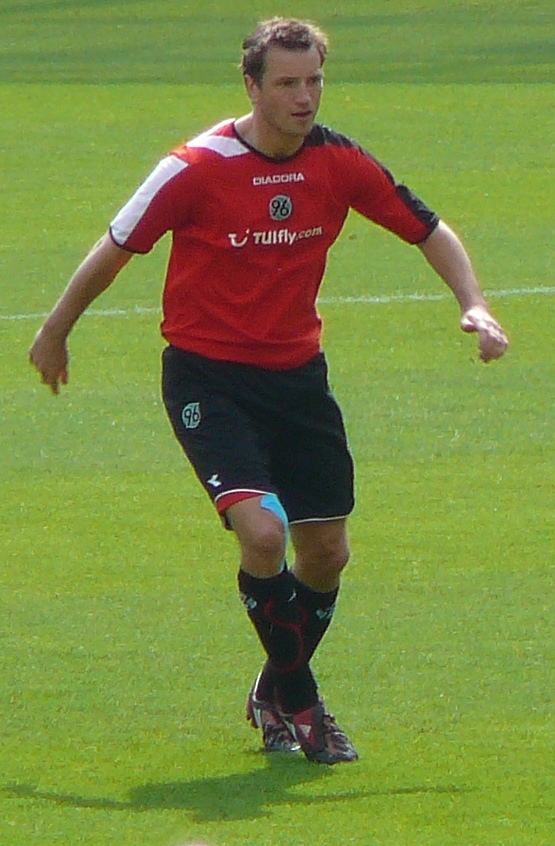
Arnold Bruggink is the most capped player for Jong Orange.

Rank	Player	Career	Matches	Goals
1	Arnold Bruggink	1995–1999	31	15
1	Leroy Fer	2009–2013	31	6
3	Daniël de Ridder	2004–2007	30	1
4	Niels Oude Kamphuis	1996–2000	28	2
5	Roy Makaay	1994–1998	27	15
5	Mark van Bommel	1996–2000	27	3
7	Kiki Musampa	1996–2000	25	8
7	Arnold Kruiswijk	2003–2007	25	0
9	Georginio Wijnaldum	2009–2013	24	10
10	Daley Blind	2009–2013	23	0
10	Klaas-Jan Huntelaar	2002–2006	23	18
10	Bram Nuytinck	2010–2013	23	2
10	Marco van Ginkel	2011–2014	23	4
10	Tonny Vilhena	2013–2016	23	4

Last updated: 29 May 2014

=== Most goals scored ===
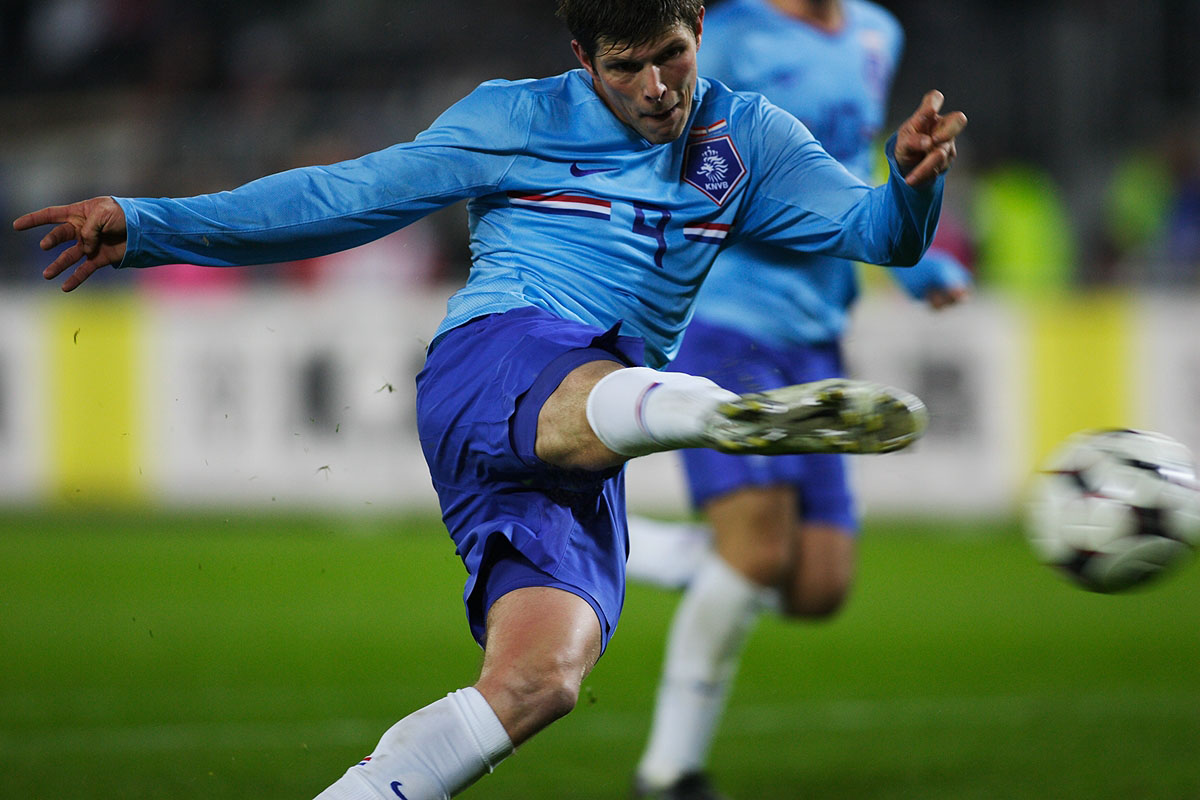
Huntelaar was the top scorer and named best player at the 2006 UEFA European Under-21 Championship, and he is the all-time top scorer for Jong Orange.

Rank	Player	Career	Goals	Matches	Average
1	Klaas-Jan Huntelaar	2002–2006	18	23	0.78
2	Roy Makaay	1994–1998	15	27	0.56
2	Arnold Bruggink	1995–1999	15	31	0.48
4	Género Zeefuik	2011–2012	10	12	0.83
4	Georginio Wijnaldum	2009–2013	10	24	0.42
6	Brian Brobbey	2021–2023	9	17	0.53
7	Vincent Janssen	2014–2015	8	10	0.80
7	Kiki Musampa	1996–2000	8	25	0.32
9	Edwin Bakker	1984–1985	7	7	1.00
9	Ronald de Boer	1989–1992	7	9	0.78
9	Quincy Promes	2013–2014	7	10	0.70
9	Joshua Zirkzee	2020–2023	7	19	0.37
9	Jurgen Ekkelenkamp	2020–2023	7	22	0.32

Last updated: 27 June 2023

== See also ==
- Netherlands national football team
- Netherlands national under-19 football team
- Netherlands national under-17 football team
- UEFA European Under-21 Championship
