= 2027 UEFA European Under-21 Championship qualification Group D =

Football tournament qualification stage

Group D of the 2027 UEFA European Under-21 Championship qualifying competition consists of six teams: England, Republic of Ireland, Slovakia, Moldova, Kazakhstan, and Andorra. The composition of the nine groups in the qualifying group stage was decided by the draw held on 6 February 2025 at the UEFA headquarters in Nyon, Switzerland, with the teams seeded according to their coefficient ranking.

== Standings ==
Pos	Team	Pld	W	D	L	GF	GA	GD	Pts	Qualification	England	Ireland	Slovakia	Moldova	Andorra	Kazakhstan
1	England	10	7	2	1	23	7	+16	23	Final tournament	—	2–0	0–0	4–1	1–0	4–2
2	Republic of Ireland	10	6	2	2	16	14	+2	20 (Note: Head-to-head points: Republic of Ireland 4, Slovakia 1.)	Play-offs	3–1	—	2–2	1–1	1–0	4–3
3	Slovakia	10	6	2	2	17	13	+4	20		0–4	0–2	—	2–0	3–0	2–1
4	Moldova	10	2	3	5	12	19	−7	9		0–4	1–2	2–3	—	3–0	3–2
5	Andorra	10	2	2	6	7	12	−5	8		1–1	4–0	1–2	0–0	—	1–0
6	Kazakhstan	10	1	1	8	11	21	−10	4		0–2	0–1	1–3	1–1	1–0	—

Source: UEFA
Rules for classification: Tiebreakers

== Matches ==
Times are CET/CEST, (Note: CEST (UTC+2) for matches until 26 October 2025 and from 29 March 2026 (matchday 1–3 and 7–10), and CET (UTC+1) for matches from 26 October 2025 to 29 March 2026 (matchday 4–6).) as listed by UEFA (local times, if different, are in parentheses).

5 June 2025
16:30 (19:30 UTC+05:00)

Kazakhstan	1–0	Andorra
Baybek 11'	Report

Astana Arena, Astana
Attendance: 4,017
Referee: Giorgi Avazashvili (Georgia)

10 June 2025
19:00 (20:00 UTC+03:00)

Moldova	3–0	Andorra
Lupan 38'; Rotaru 61'; Costin 90+5'	Report

Nisporeni Central Stadium, Nisporeni
Attendance: 873
Referee: Alexandros Tsakalidis (Greece)

4 September 2025
19:00 (20:00 UTC+03:00)

Moldova	1–2	Republic of Ireland
Lupan 23'	Report	Melia 37', 74'

Nisporeni Central Stadium, Nisporeni
Attendance: 1,180
Referee: Klym Zabroda (Ukraine)
5 September 2025
18:00

Slovakia	3–0	Andorra
Griger 17' (pen.); Sovič 86'; Riznič 90+2'	Report

Mestský štadión, Skalica
Attendance: 1,608
Referee: Ilioski Vlatko (North Macedonia)

8 September 2025
17:00 (20:00 UTC+05:00)

Kazakhstan	0–2	England
	Report	Nwaneri 18'; Bellingham 23'

Central Stadium, Aktobe
Attendance: 9,624
Referee: Edgar Malcevs (Latvia)
9 September 2025
18:00 (19:00 UTC+03:00)

Moldova	2–3	Slovakia
Costin 38', 90+1' (pen.)	Report	Sauer 53'; Jakubko 64'; Blaško 84'

Nisporeni Central Stadium, Nisporeni
Attendance: 703
Referee: Jérémy Muller (Luxembourg)
9 September 2025
20:30 (19:30 UTC+01:00)

Republic of Ireland	1–0	Andorra
M. Noonan 66'	Report

Tallaght Stadium, Dublin
Attendance: 1,387
Referee: Heini Ziskason Viðoy (Faroe Islands)

9 October 2025
19:30

Andorra	1–0	Kazakhstan
Domínguez 67'	Report

Estadi Nacional, Andorra la Vella
Attendance: 290
Referee: João António Ferreira Gonçalves (Portugal)
10 October 2025
18:00 (19:00 UTC+03:00)

Moldova	0–4	England
	Report	Gittens 28'; Mubama 68', 74' (pen.); Lewis 89'

Zimbru Stadium, Chișinău
Attendance: 2,849
Referee: Bence Csonka (Hungary)
10 October 2025
20:30 (19:30 UTC+01:00)

Republic of Ireland	2–2	Slovakia
Mullins 4'; Hakiki 60'	Report	Melia 3' (o.g.); Marcelli 44'

Turners Cross, Cork
Attendance: 3,872
Referee: Lionel Tschudi (Switzerland)

13 October 2025
20:45 (19:45 UTC+01:00)

England	1–0	Andorra
George 41'	Report

Pride Park Stadium, Derby
Attendance: 9,298
Referee: Jacob Karlsen (Denmark)
14 October 2025
18:00

Slovakia	2–0	Moldova
Fiala 11'; Sauer 17'	Report

Košická futbalová aréna, Košice
Attendance: 2,403
Referee: Vitālijs Spasjoņņikovs (Latvia)

13 November 2025
18:00

Slovakia	2–1	Kazakhstan
Fiala 52', 60'	Report	Bagdat 11'

Futbal Tatran Arena, Prešov
Attendance: 4,767
Referee: Ian McNabb (Northern Ireland)
14 November 2025
20:45 (19:45 UTC+00:00)

England	2–0	Republic of Ireland
Mubama 60' (pen.); George 90+1'	Report

St Andrew's, Birmingham
Attendance: 9,961
Referee: Iuliana Demetrescu (Romania)

17 November 2025
15:30 (19:30 UTC+05:00)

Kazakhstan	1–1	Moldova
Bagdat 6'	Report	Rotaru 90' (pen.)

Astana Arena, Astana
Attendance: 5,421
Referee: Pavle Ilić (Serbia)
18 November 2025
18:00

Slovakia	0–4	England
	Report	Mubama 18', 87'; Nwaneri 60'; King 73'

Futbal Tatran Arena, Prešov
Attendance: 5,903
Referee: Kamal Umudlu (Azerbaijan)
18 November 2025
19:30

Andorra	4–0	Republic of Ireland
Garcia 16', 74' (pen.); Ferreira 23'; de Olivera 49'	Report

Estadi Nacional, Andorra la Vella
Attendance: 280
Referee: Anton Lashuk (Belarus)

26 March 2026
18:15 (17:15 UTC+00:00)

Republic of Ireland	1–1	Moldova
Mullins 26'	Report	Luchița 20'

Tallaght Stadium, Dublin
Attendance: 860
Referee: Walter Altmann (Austria)
27 March 2026
16:00 (20:00 UTC+05:00)

Kazakhstan	1–3	Slovakia
Toktybay 79'	Report	Marcelli 18' (pen.); Gajdoš 56'; Rehuš 90+6'

Turkistan Arena, Turkistan
Attendance: 6,800
Referee: Atilla Karaoğlan (Turkey)
27 March 2026
19:30

Andorra	1–1	England
Sola 52'	Report	Lewis 90' (pen.)

Estadi Nacional, Andorra la Vella
Attendance: 1,007
Referee: Klym Zabroda (Ukraine)

31 March 2026
16:00 (19:00 UTC+05:00)

Kazakhstan	0–1	Republic of Ireland
	Report	Gallagher 89'

Turkistan Arena, Turkistan
Attendance: 6,100
Referee: Karl Koppel (Estonia)
31 March 2026
20:00 (19:00 UTC+01:00)

England	4–1	Moldova
Nwaneri 11', 73'; Gray 61'; Esse 82'	Report	Luchita 48'

Carrow Road, Norwich
Attendance: 11,547
Referee: Patryk Gryckiewicz (Poland)

25 September 2026
18:00

Slovakia	0–2	Republic of Ireland
	Report	Lonergan 2'; Grehan 57'

Košická futbalová aréna, Košice
Attendance: 5,432
Referee: Viktor Kopiievskyi (Ukraine)
25 September 2026
20:30 (19:30 UTC+01:00)

England	4–2	Kazakhstan
Turganov 27' (o.g.); Acheampong 32'; Alleyne 60'; Lankshear 90+1'	Report	Litosh 3'; Popov 43'

Molineux Stadium, Wolverhampton
Attendance: 5,341
Referee: Mateo Tozan (Slovenia)

29 September 2026
20:00 (19:00 UTC+01:00)

Republic of Ireland	4–3	Kazakhstan
Murphy 22'; Mullins 29'; Curtis 48'; Lonergan 86' (pen.)	Report	Litosh 1'; Karimov 38'; Askarov 52'

Turners Cross, Cork
Attendance: 771
Referee: Loïc Thomas (Luxembourg)
2 October 2026
19:30

Andorra	0–0	Moldova
	Report

Estadi Nacional, Andorra la Vella
Attendance: 362
Referee: Aleko Aptsiauri (Georgia)
2 October 2026
20:45 (19:45 UTC+01:00)

England	0–0	Slovakia
	Report

bet365 Stadium, Stoke-on-Trent
Attendance: 8,313
Referee: Mateo Busquets Ferrer (Spain)

6 October 2026
16:00 (17:00 UTC+03:00)

Moldova	3–2	Kazakhstan
Luchița 38'; Țurcan 72', 90'	Report	Popov 13'; Omatay 38'

Nisporeni Central Stadium, Nisporeni
Attendance: 444
Referee: Christos Vergetis (Greece)
6 October 2026
19:00

Andorra	1–2	Slovakia
Sola 74'	Report	Sauer 18' (pen.), 90+1'

Estadi Nacional, Andorra la Vella
Attendance: 305
Referee: Joonas Jaanovits (Estonia)
6 October 2026
19:00 (18:00 UTC+1)

Republic of Ireland	3–1	England
Lonergan 22', 63'; McManus 38'	Report	Dibling 8'

Turners Cross, Cork
Attendance: 5,427
Referee: Alessandro Dudic (Switzerland)

== Goalscorers ==
There were 86 goals scored in 30 matches, for an average of 2.87 goals per match.

5 goals

- (England national under-21 football team) Divin Mubama

4 goals

- (England national under-21 football team) Ethan Nwaneri
- (Republic of Ireland national under-21 football team) Tommy Lonergan
- (Slovakia national under-21 football team) Mário Sauer

3 goals

- (Moldova national under-21 football team) Vladislav Costin
- (Moldova national under-21 football team) Vasile Luchița
- (Republic of Ireland national under-21 football team) Jamie Mullins
- (Slovakia national under-21 football team) Adrián Fiala

2 goals

- (Andorra national under-21 football team) Gerard Garcia
- (Andorra national under-21 football team) Gerard Sola
- (England national under-21 football team) Tyrique George
- (England national under-21 football team) Rico Lewis
- (Kazakhstan national under-21 football team) Ramazan Bagdat
- (Kazakhstan national under-21 football team) Artyom Litosh
- (Kazakhstan national under-21 football team) Saif Popov
- (Moldova national under-21 football team) Mihai Lupan
- (Moldova national under-21 football team) Nicu Rotaru
- (Moldova national under-21 football team) Serghei Țurcan
- (Republic of Ireland national under-21 football team) Mason Melia
- (Slovakia national under-21 football team) Nino Marcelli

1 goal

- (Andorra national under-21 football team) Ian de Olivera
- (Andorra national under-21 football team) Iván Domínguez
- (Andorra national under-21 football team) Hugo Ferreira
- (England national under-21 football team) Josh Acheampong
- (England national under-21 football team) Max Alleyne
- (England national under-21 football team) Jobe Bellingham
- (England national under-21 football team) Tyler Dibling
- (England national under-21 football team) Romain Esse
- (England national under-21 football team) Jamie Gittens
- (England national under-21 football team) Archie Gray
- (England national under-21 football team) Josh King
- (England national under-21 football team) Will Lankshear
- (Kazakhstan national under-21 football team) Sultan Askarov
- (Kazakhstan national under-21 football team) Olzhas Baybek
- (Kazakhstan national under-21 football team) Ramazan Karimov
- (Kazakhstan national under-21 football team) Miras Omatay
- (Kazakhstan national under-21 football team) Magzhan Toktybay
- (Republic of Ireland national under-21 football team) Sam Curtis
- (Republic of Ireland national under-21 football team) Oisin Gallagher
- (Republic of Ireland national under-21 football team) Séan Grehan
- (Republic of Ireland national under-21 football team) Jad Hakiki
- (Republic of Ireland national under-21 football team) Conor McManus
- (Republic of Ireland national under-21 football team) Alex Murphy
- (Republic of Ireland national under-21 football team) Michael Noonan
- (Slovakia national under-21 football team) Karol Blaško
- (Slovakia national under-21 football team) Artur Gajdoš
- (Slovakia national under-21 football team) Adam Griger
- (Slovakia national under-21 football team) Jakub Jakubko
- (Slovakia national under-21 football team) Milan Rehuš
- (Slovakia national under-21 football team) Matej Riznič
- (Slovakia national under-21 football team) Miroslav Sovič

1 own goal

- (Kazakhstan national under-21 football team) Ali Turganov (against England)
- (Republic of Ireland national under-21 football team) Mason Melia (against Slovakia)
