= 2027 UEFA European Under-21 Championship qualification Group G =

Football tournament qualification stage

Group G of the 2027 UEFA European Under-21 Championship qualifying competition consists of five teams: Netherlands, Norway, Slovenia, Israel, and Bosnia and Herzegovina. The composition of the nine groups in the qualifying group stage was decided by the draw held on 6 February 2025 at the UEFA headquarters in Nyon, Switzerland, with the teams seeded according to their coefficient ranking.

== Standings ==
Pos	Team	Pld	W	D	L	GF	GA	GD	Pts	Qualification	Norway	Netherlands	Israel	Bosnia and Herzegovina	Slovenia
1	Norway	8	5	2	1	19	6	+13	17	Final tournament	—	3–2	1–1	6–1	5–0
2	Netherlands	8	3	3	2	15	10	+5	12	Play-offs	0–0	—	2–2	4–0	2–0
3	Israel	8	2	5	1	10	10	0	11		0–3	3–1	—	0–0	1–1
4	Bosnia and Herzegovina	8	1	4	3	3	11	−8	7		0–1	0–0	0–0	—	0–0
5	Slovenia	8	1	2	5	7	17	−10	5		2–0	2–4	2–3	0–2	—

Source: UEFA
Rules for classification: Tiebreakers

== Matches ==
Times are CET/CEST, (Note: CEST (UTC+2) for matches until 26 October 2025 and from 29 March 2026 (matchday 1–3 and 7–10), and CET (UTC+1) for matches from 26 October 2025 to 29 March 2026 (matchday 4–6).) as listed by UEFA (local times, if different, are in parentheses).

5 September 2025
18:00

Bosnia and Herzegovina	0–0	Israel
	Report

Stadion pod Bijelim Brijegom, Mostar
Attendance: 0 (behind closed doors)
Referee: Márton Rúsz (Hungary)

9 September 2025
17:00

Netherlands	2–2	Israel
Poku 66', 83'	Report	Binyamin 61'; Linn 90+1'

De Koel, Venlo
Attendance: 0 (behind closed doors)
Referee: Miloš Milanović (Serbia)
9 September 2025
18:00

Norway	5–0	Slovenia
Ødegård 8'; Golič 15' (o.g.); Bassi 19'; Egeli 47'; Helland 55'	Report

Marienlyst Stadion, Drammen
Attendance: 488
Referee: Jamie Robinson (Northern Ireland)

10 October 2025
18:00

Bosnia and Herzegovina	0–0	Netherlands
	Report

Stadion Grbavica, Sarajevo
Attendance: 210
Referee: Szabolcs Kovacs (Romania)
10 October 2025
18:00

Israel	1–1	Slovenia
Abed 53'	Report	Topalović 55'

BSC Stadium, Budaörs (Hungary) (Note: Due to the Gaza war, Israel are required to play their home matches at neutral venues until further notice.)
Attendance: 42
Referee: Christos Vergetis (Greece)

14 October 2025
18:00

Slovenia	0–2	Bosnia and Herzegovina
	Report	Kujović 64'; Keranović 82'

Bonifika Stadium, Koper
Attendance: 521
Referee: Sam Barrott (England)

14 November 2025
18:30

Netherlands	2–0	Slovenia
Zechiël 61'; Poku 77'	Report

Kooi Stadion, Leeuwarden
Attendance: 3,996
Referee: Jakob Sundberg (Denmark)
14 November 2025
18:45

Israel	0–3	Norway
	Report	Broholm 12' (pen.), 63' (pen.); Egeli 46'

Széktói Stadion, Kecskemet (Hungary)
Attendance: 25
Referee: Aaron Wyn Jones (Wales)

18 November 2025
19:30

Israel	3–1	Netherlands
Abu Rumi 36'; Binyamin 45+1'; Distalfeld 81'	Report	Addai 15'

BSC Stadium, Budaörs (Hungary)
Attendance: 67
Referee: Nathan Verboomen (Netherlands)
18 November 2025
18:00

Bosnia and Herzegovina	0–1	Norway
	Report	Jurkas 70' (o.g.)

Stadion Grbavica, Sarajevo
Attendance: 318
Referee: Walter Altmann (Austria)

27 March 2026
15:00

Bosnia and Herzegovina	0–0	Slovenia
	Report

Stadion Grbavica, Sarajevo
Attendance: 220
Referee: Ante Čulina (Croatia)
27 March 2026
18:00

Norway	3–2	Netherlands
Egeli 35', 77'; Holten 90+2'	Report	Zechiël 57' (pen.), 63'

Viking Stadion, Stavanger
Attendance: 575
Referee: Donald Robertson (Scotland)

31 March 2026
16:00

Slovenia	2–0	Norway
Malenšek 6'; Pejičić 76'	Report

Ptuj City Stadium, Ptuj
Attendance: 476
Referee: Dalibor Černý (Czech Republic)
31 March 2026
18:00

Israel	0–0	Bosnia and Herzegovina
	Report

BSC Stadium, Budaörs (Hungary)
Attendance: 74
Referee: Matthew De Gabriele (Malta)

25 September 2026
18:30

Netherlands	0–0	Norway
	Report

De Adelaarshorst, Deventer
Attendance: 6,019
Referee: Márton Rúsz (Hungary)

29 September 2026
16:00

Slovenia	2–3	Israel
Kojić 7'; Ilenič 74'	Report	Abed 27'; Binyamin 48'; Yehoshua 90+2'

Ptuj City Stadium, Ptuj
Attendance: 324
Referee: Oliver Reitala (Finland)
29 September 2026
18:00

Norway	6–1	Bosnia and Herzegovina
Egeli 14', 45', 79'; Ødegård 77', 87'; Hjertø-Dahl 84'	Report	Deket 7'

Viking Stadion, Stavanger
Attendance: 1,473
Referee: Ryan Lee (Scotland)

2 October 2026
18:00

Slovenia	2–4	Netherlands
Pejičić 15'; Matjašec 47'	Report	Oufkir 19'; Zeefuik 28'; Poku 54'; Smit 57'

Ljudski vrt, Maribor
Attendance: 623
Referee: Anojen Kanagasingam (Switzerland)

6 October 2026
18:45

Netherlands	4–0	Bosnia and Herzegovina
Sliti 70'; Zeefuik 79', 90+1'; Haen 84'	Report

De Vijverberg, Doetinchem
Attendance: 5,018
Referee: Dalibor Černý (Czech Republic)
6 October 2026
18:45

Norway	1–1	Israel
Moi 83'	Report	Abed 70' (pen.)

Viking Stadion, Stavanger
Attendance: 60
Referee: Cláudio Pereira (Portugal)

== Goalscorers ==
There were 54 goals scored in 20 matches, for an average of 2.7 goals per match.

7 goals

- (Norway national under-21 football team) Sindre Walle Egeli

4 goals

- (Netherlands national under-21 football team) Ernest Poku

3 goals

- (Israel national under-21 football team) Tai Abed
- (Israel national under-21 football team) Ran Binyamin
- (Netherlands national under-21 football team) Gjivai Zechiël
- (Netherlands national under-21 football team) Lequincio Zeefuik
- (Norway national under-21 football team) Niklas Ødegård

2 goals

- (Norway national under-21 football team) Marius Broholm
- (Slovenia national under-21 football team) David Pejičić

1 goal

- (Bosnia and Herzegovina national under-21 football team) Matej Deket
- (Bosnia and Herzegovina national under-21 football team) Nedim Keranović
- (Bosnia and Herzegovina national under-21 football team) Emin Kujović
- (Israel national under-21 football team) Mohamad Abu Rumi
- (Israel national under-21 football team) Yanai Distalfeld
- (Israel national under-21 football team) Bar Linn
- (Israel national under-21 football team) Niv Yehoshua
- (Netherlands national under-21 football team) Jayden Addai
- (Netherlands national under-21 football team) Devin Haen
- (Netherlands national under-21 football team) Ayoub Oufkir
- (Netherlands national under-21 football team) Aymen Sliti
- (Netherlands national under-21 football team) Kees Smit
- (Norway national under-21 football team) Daniel Bassi
- (Norway national under-21 football team) Eivind Helland
- (Norway national under-21 football team) Jens Hjertø-Dahl
- (Norway national under-21 football team) Rasmus Holten
- (Norway national under-21 football team) [Tobias Moi]
- (Slovenia national under-21 football team) Mitja Ilenič
- (Slovenia national under-21 football team) Dino Kojić
- (Slovenia national under-21 football team) Matej Malenšek
- (Slovenia national under-21 football team) Miha Matjašec
- (Slovenia national under-21 football team) Luka Topalović

1 own goal

- (Bosnia and Herzegovina national under-21 football team) Mladen Jurkas (against Norway)
- (Slovenia national under-21 football team) Lovro Golič (against Norway)
