= Ján Gabriel =

Slovak footballer

Ján Gabriel (born 18 April 1962) is a Slovak former professional footballer who played as a midfielder, mostly for FC Spartak Trnava.

== Club career ==
Gabriel was born in Trnava, played for DAC Dunajská Streda and FC Spartak Trnava in Slovakia, and had spells with Bursaspor and Zeytinburnuspor in the Turkish Super Lig.
