= 2027 UEFA European Under-21 Championship =

Kampionati Evropian 2027 UEFA U-21 Европско првенство у фудбалу до 21 година 2027.

Tournament details
- Host countries: Albania; Serbia
- Dates: 16 June – 3 July
- Teams: 16 (from 1 confederation)
- Venues: 8 (in 7 host cities)

The 2027 UEFA European Under-21 Championship (also known as UEFA Under-21 Euro 2027) will be the 26th edition of the UEFA European Under-21 Championship (29th edition if the Under-23 era is also included), the biennial international youth football championship organised by UEFA for the men's under-21 national teams of Europe. The tournament will be hosted by Albania and Serbia. A total of 16 teams will play in the final tournament. Players born on or after 1 January 2004 are eligible to participate.

As with previous Under-21 Championships held one year prior to the Olympic Games, this tournament will serve as European qualifying for the 2028 Summer Olympics. The top three eligible teams will qualify for the men's football tournament of the 2028 Summer Olympics, where they will be represented by their under-23 national teams with a maximum of three overage players allowed.

England are the two-time defending champions, having defeated Germany in the 2025 final and Spain in the 2023 final.

== Bidding process ==
- Albania and Serbia – On 9 May 2024, Albania and Serbia confirmed their intent to bid together. Albania originally wanted to bid alone, however the stadium requirements for the tournament led the Albanians to find a partner. In an interview, Albanian federation president, Armand Duka said that, prior to choosing Serbia, Albania had first contacted the football federations from Kosovo and North Macedonia for a potential co-host, although this failed to materialise as both nations did not meet the requirements. He followed by saying that of the other bidders at the time, the federation chose Serbia over Belgium and Turkey. The opening match would be in Tirana and the final would held at the National Stadium in Belgrade if built in time.

Protests

This bid has generated a considerable amount of controversy in both nations due to both nations' mutual dislike of each other, their relations with Kosovo, as well as other matters. Back in October 2014, both nations played a UEFA Euro 2016 qualifier game in Belgrade, which was eventually abandoned after 42 minutes following several incidents and a pitch invasion during the match. Both the Serbian and Albanian football federations have been fined numerous times due to fans displaying politically motivated banners about Kosovo and each other. On 20 May 2024, an Albanian fan group protested by spraying paint and gluing photos in front of the offices of the federation. In response, Kosovo announced a huge revamp of their stadiums after the news of the joint bid. Albania's most capped player, Lorik Cana, has also criticised the bid. However, former politician Milaim Zeka supported the bid. Fan groups in Albania and Kosovo have both said they are strongly against the bid.

Withdrew

- Belgium (withdrew due to mounting security challenges)
- Turkey (withdrew due to mounting security challenges)

On 26 September 2024, UEFA announced that Albania and Serbia were the sole bidders. The host was set to be decided by the UEFA Executive Committee on 16 December 2024, however the selection delayed to February 2025 whilst awaiting security guarantees. On 4 February 2025, Albania and Serbia were given the hosting rights.

== Preparations ==
- Shortly after being awarded the hosting rights, Serbia announced that captain of the 2004 squad who finished as runners-up (as Serbia and Montenegro), Danko Lazović, will be an ambassador for the tournament.

== Venues ==
Contrary to original reports saying that Belgrade will host the final, UEFA announced on 4 February 2025 that the National stadium in Tirana will host the final, with Serbia hosting the opening match in Belgrade.

Host cities in Albania are Tirana, Shkodër and Elbasan, while Serbia's host cities are Belgrade, Loznica, Leskovac and Bačka Topola.

Tirana		Venues in Albania
Arena Kombëtare	Arena e Demave	Location of venues used in the 2027 UEFA European Under-21 Championship (Albania)
Capacity: 22,500	Capacity: 3,959	Location of venues used in the 2027 UEFA European Under-21 Championship (Albania)
Shkodër	Elbasan	Location of venues used in the 2027 UEFA European Under-21 Championship (Albania)
Loro Boriçi Stadium	Elbasan Arena	Location of venues used in the 2027 UEFA European Under-21 Championship (Albania)
Capacity: 16,000	Capacity: 12,800	Location of venues used in the 2027 UEFA European Under-21 Championship (Albania)

Belgrade	Leskovac	Venues in Serbia
Partizan Stadium	Dubočica Stadium	Location of venues used in the 2027 UEFA European Under-21 Championship (Serbia)
Capacity: 29,775	Capacity: 8,136	Location of venues used in the 2027 UEFA European Under-21 Championship (Serbia)
Bačka Topola	Loznica	Location of venues used in the 2027 UEFA European Under-21 Championship (Serbia)
TSC Arena	Lagator Stadium	Location of venues used in the 2027 UEFA European Under-21 Championship (Serbia)
Capacity: 4,500	Capacity: 8,030	Location of venues used in the 2027 UEFA European Under-21 Championship (Serbia)

== Qualification ==
=== Qualified teams ===
The following teams qualified for the final tournament.

Note: All appearance statistics include only U-21 era (since 1978).

Team	Qualification method	Date of qualification	Appearance(s)				Previous best performance (Note: Italic text indicates hosts of that edition.)
Team	Qualification method	Date of qualification	Total	First	Last	Streak	Previous best performance
Serbia	Co-hosts	4 February 2025	12th (Note: Including four appearances as Yugoslavia and two as Serbia and Montenegro. Their previous best performance as Serbia was runners-up (2007).)	1978	2019	1	Champions (1978) (as Yugoslavia)
Albania	Co-hosts	4 February 2025	2nd	1984		1	Quarter-finals (1984)
Croatia	Group H winners	26 September 2026	6th	2000	2023	1	Quarter-finals (2021)
Norway	Group G winners	29 September 2026	4th	1998	2023	1	Semi-finals (1998, 2013)
Portugal	Group B winners	30 September 2026	12th	1994	2025	4	Runners-up (1994, 2015, 2021)
England	Group D winners	2 October 2026	19th	1978	2025	11	Champions (1982, 1984, 2023, 2025)
France	Group C winners	3 October 2026	13th	1982	2025	5	Champions (1988)
Italy	Group E winners	5 October 2026	24th	1978	2025	8	Champions (1992, 1994, 1996, 2000, 2004)
Germany	Group F winners	6 October 2026	16th	1982	2025	8	Champions (2009, 2017, 2021)
Poland	Best runner-up	6 October 2026	9th	1982	2025	2	Quarter-finals (1982, 1984, 1986, 1992, 1994)
Belgium	Group I winners	6 October 2026	5th	2002	2023	1	Semi-finals (2007)
Spain	Group A winners	6 October 2026	18th	1982	2025	6	Champions (1986, 1998, 2011, 2013, 2019)
Greece	Play-offs winner	16 November 2026	5th	1988	2002	1	Runners-up (1988, 1998)
Netherlands	Play-offs winner	17 November 2026	11th	1988	2025	4	Champions (2006, 2007)
Czech Republic	Play-offs winner	17 November 2026	17th (Note: Including six appearances as Czechoslovakia.)	1978	2025	4	Champions (2002)
Finland	Play-offs winner	17 November 2026	3rd	2009	2025	2	Group stage (2009, 2025)

== Draw ==
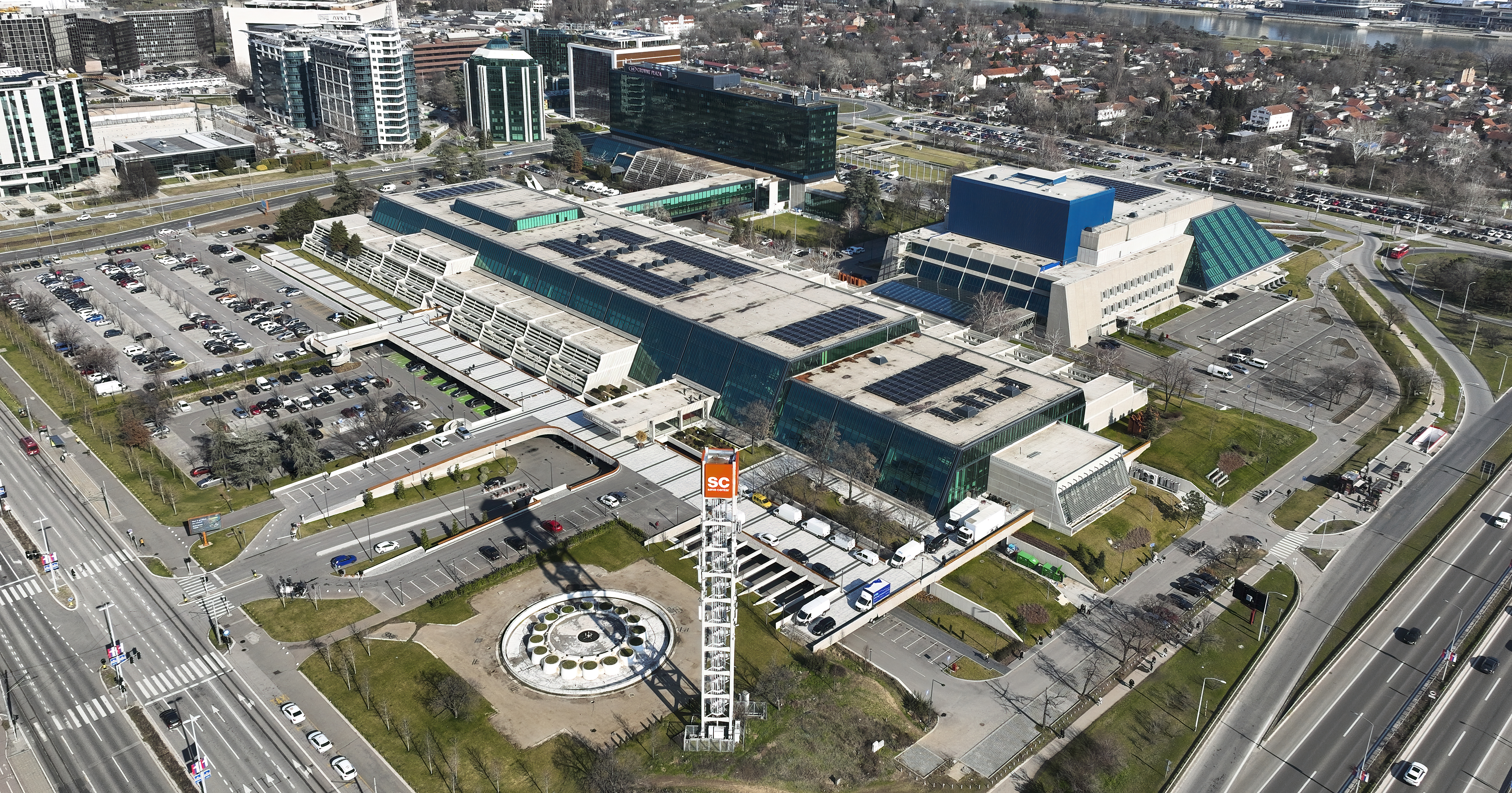
The Sava Centar in Belgrade hosted the draw.

The draw will be held at 18:30 CET on 26 November 2026 at the Sava Centar in Belgrade, Serbia. Before the draw started, hosts Serbia and Albania were pre-allocated, Serbia into position A1 in Group A, Albania into position B1 in Group B.

=== Seeding ===
The seeding was based on the UEFA men's U-21 national team coefficient rankings as of November 2026.

Pot 1
Team	Position	Coeff
Spain	1	40,415
Germany	2	39,670
England	3	39,248
Portugal	4	37,635

Pot 2
Team	Position	Coeff
France	5	37,296
Italy	6	35,886
Netherlands	7	33,441
Croatia	8	32,702

Pot 3
Team	Position	Coeff
Poland	9	32,649
Greece	10	31,652
Finland	11	31,486
Norway	12	31,471

Pot 4
Team	Position	Coeff
Belgium	13	30,517
Czech Republic	14	29,607
Serbia (H)	15	24,991
Albania (H)	16	24,521

=== Draw results ===
Group A
Pos	Team
A1	Serbia (H)
A2	
A3	
A4	

Group B
Pos	Team
B1	Albania (H)
B2	
B3	
B4	

Group C
Pos	Team
C1	
C2	
C3	
C4	

Group D
Pos	Team
D1	
D2	
D3	
D4	

== Group stage ==
The provisional schedule was unveiled on 6 October 2026. The detailed schedule with the qualified teams involved will be confirmed shortly after the draw. Groups A and C will be played in Serbia, Groups B and D in Albania. The group winners and runners-up will advance to the knockout stage, beginning with the quarter-finals.

All times are local, CEST (UTC+2).

=== Tiebreakers ===
The ranking of teams in the group stage was determined as follows:

1. Points obtained in all group matches;
2. Points in head-to-head matches among tied teams;
3. Goal difference in head-to-head matches among tied teams;
4. Goals scored in head-to-head matches among tied teams;
5. If more than two teams were tied, and after applying all head-to-head criteria above, a subset of teams were still tied, all head-to-head criteria above were reapplied exclusively to this subset of teams;
6. Goal difference in all group matches;
7. Goals scored in all group matches;
8. Penalty shoot-out if only two teams had the same number of points, and they met in the last round of the group and were tied after applying all criteria above (not used if more than two teams had the same number of points, or if their rankings were not relevant for qualification for the next stage);
9. Disciplinary points
  - Yellow card: −1 point;
  - Indirect red card (second yellow card): −3 points;
  - Direct red card: −3 points;
10. UEFA coefficient for the qualifying round draw;
11. Drawing of lots.

=== Group A ===
Pos	Team	Pld	W	D	L	GF	GA	GD	Pts	Qualification
1	Serbia (H)	0	0	0	0	0	0	0	0	Knockout stage
2	A2	0	0	0	0	0	0	0	0	Knockout stage
3	A3	0	0	0	0	0	0	0	0	
4	A4	0	0	0	0	0	0	0	0	

First match(es) will be played: 16 June 2027. Source: UEFA
Rules for classification: Group stage tiebreakers
(H) Hosts
16 June 2027

Serbia	v	A2

Partizan Stadium, Belgrade
16 June 2027

A3	v	A4

Dubočica Stadium, Leskovac

19 June 2027

Serbia	v	A3

Partizan Stadium, Belgrade
19 June 2027

A2	v	A4

Dubočica Stadium, Leskovac

22 June 2027

A2	v	A3

Partizan Stadium, Belgrade
22 June 2027

A4	v	Serbia

Dubočica Stadium, Leskovac

=== Group B ===
Pos	Team	Pld	W	D	L	GF	GA	GD	Pts	Qualification
1	Albania (H)	0	0	0	0	0	0	0	0	Knockout stage
2	B2	0	0	0	0	0	0	0	0	Knockout stage
3	B3	0	0	0	0	0	0	0	0	
4	B4	0	0	0	0	0	0	0	0	

First match(es) will be played: 16 June 2027. Source: UEFA
Rules for classification: Group stage tiebreakers
(H) Hosts
16 June 2027

Albania	v	B2

Arena Kombëtare, Tirana
16 June 2027

B3	v	B4

Elbasan Arena, Elbasan

19 June 2027

Albania	v	B3

Arena Kombëtare, Tirana
19 June 2027

B2	v	B4

Elbasan Arena, Elbasan

22 June 2027

B2	v	B3

Arena Kombëtare, Tirana
22 June 2027

B4	v	Albania

Elbasan Arena, Elbasan

=== Group C ===
Pos	Team	Pld	W	D	L	GF	GA	GD	Pts	Qualification
1	C1	0	0	0	0	0	0	0	0	Knockout stage
2	C2	0	0	0	0	0	0	0	0	Knockout stage
3	C3	0	0	0	0	0	0	0	0	
4	C4	0	0	0	0	0	0	0	0	

First match(es) will be played: 16 June 2027. Source: UEFA
Rules for classification: Group stage tiebreakers
17 June 2027

C3	v	C4

TSC Arena, Bačka Topola
17 June 2027

C1	v	C2

Lagator Stadium, Loznica

20 June 2027

C2	v	C4

TSC Arena, Bačka Topola
20 June 2027

C1	v	C3

Lagator Stadium, Loznica

23 June 2027

C2	v	C3

TSC Arena, Bačka Topola
23 June 2027

C4	v	C1

Lagator Stadium, Loznica

=== Group D ===
Pos	Team	Pld	W	D	L	GF	GA	GD	Pts	Qualification
1	D1	0	0	0	0	0	0	0	0	Knockout stage
2	D2	0	0	0	0	0	0	0	0	Knockout stage
3	D3	0	0	0	0	0	0	0	0	
4	D4	0	0	0	0	0	0	0	0	

First match(es) will be played: 16 June 2027. Source: UEFA
Rules for classification: Group stage tiebreakers
17 June 2027

D1	v	D2

Loro Boriçi Stadium, Shkodër
17 June 2027

D3	v	D4

Arena e Demave, Tirana

20 June 2027

D1	v	D3

Loro Boriçi Stadium, Shkodër
20 June 2027

D2	v	D4

Arena e Demave, Tirana

23 June 2027

D4	v	D1

Loro Boriçi Stadium, Shkodër
23 June 2027

D2	v	D3

Arena e Demave, Tirana

== Knockout stage ==
In the knockout stage, extra time and a penalty shoot-out were used to decide the winners if necessary.

=== Bracket ===
Quarter-finals
26 June – Belgrade
Winner Group A
Runner-up Group C
27 June – Loznica
Winner Group C
Runner-up Group A
26 June – Elbasan
Winner Group B
Runner-up Group D
27 June – Shkodër
Winner Group D
Runner-up Group B

Semi-finals
30 June – Belgrade
30 June – Tirana

Final
3 July – Tirana
Olympic Playoff
3 July – Bačka Topola

== Broadcasters ==
=== Europe ===
To be announced

=== Outside Europe ===
For the countries without broadcasting rights, the tournament coverage are available for free on UEFA TV.

Region	Broadcaster	Ref.
Thailand	MONOMAX	
