= 2027 UEFA European Under-21 Championship qualification Group E =

Football tournament qualification stage

Group E of the 2027 UEFA European Under-21 Championship qualifying competition consists of six teams: Italy, Poland, Sweden, North Macedonia, Montenegro, and Armenia. The composition of the nine groups in the qualifying group stage was decided by the draw held on 6 February 2025 at the UEFA headquarters in Nyon, Switzerland, with the teams seeded according to their coefficient ranking.

== Standings ==
Pos	Team	Pld	W	D	L	GF	GA	GD	Pts	Qualification	Italy	Poland	Sweden	Montenegro	North Macedonia	Armenia
1	Italy	10	9	0	1	32	7	+25	27 (Note: Tied on head-to-head points (3). Head-to-head goal difference: Italy +3, Poland −3.)	Final tournament	—	6–2	4–0	2–1	4–0	5–1
2	Poland	10	9	0	1	28	8	+20	27	Final tournament	2–1	—	3–0	2–0	3–0	4–1
3	Sweden	10	4	1	5	12	22	−10	13		0–4	0–6	—	2–2	2–0	3–0
4	Montenegro	10	3	3	4	13	16	−3	12		1–4	0–1	2–0	—	3–2	1–1
5	North Macedonia	10	2	1	7	8	20	−12	7		0–1	0–1	1–4	1–1	—	2–1
6	Armenia	10	0	1	9	5	25	−20	1		0–1	0–4	0–1	1–2	0–2	—

Source: UEFA
Rules for classification: Tiebreakers

== Matches ==
Times are CET/CEST, (Note: CEST (UTC+2) for matches until 26 October 2025 and from 29 March 2026 (matchday 1–3 and 7–10), and CET (UTC+1) for matches from 26 October 2025 to 29 March 2026 (matchday 4–6).) as listed by UEFA (local times, if different, are in parentheses).

5 September 2025
18:00

Sweden	3–0	Armenia
Kusi-Asare 61'; Agbonifo 69'; Bardghji 78' (pen.)	Report

Falcon Alkoholfri Arena, Falkenberg
Attendance: 1,025
Referee: Anton Lashuk (Belarus)
5 September 2025
18:00

Poland	3–0	North Macedonia
Zendelovski 22' (o.g.); Reguła 65'; Pietuszewski 68'	Report

Józef Piłsudski Cracovia Stadium, Kraków
Attendance: 5,874
Referee: Karel Rouček (Czech Republic)
5 September 2025
18:15

Italy	2–1	Montenegro
Lipani 52'; Koleosho 79' (pen.)	Report	Kostić 4'

Stadio Alberto Picco, La Spezia
Attendance: 2,500
Referee: Sven Wolfensberger (Switzerland)

9 September 2025
15:00 (17:00 UTC+4)

Armenia	0–4	Poland
	Report	Pietuszewski 36', 82'; Matysik 45+4'; Bogacz 56'

Yerevan Football Academy Stadium, Yerevan
Attendance: 950
Referee: Tom Owen (Wales)
9 September 2025
18:15

North Macedonia	0–1	Italy
	Report	Marianucci 35'

Petar Miloševski Stadium, Bitola
Attendance: 7,559
Referee: Genc Nuza (Kosovo)
9 September 2025
20:00

Montenegro	2–0	Sweden
Đukanović 90+5'; Vukanić 90+9'	Report

Podgorica City Stadium, Podgorica
Attendance: 400
Referee: Matthew De Gabriele (Malta)

10 October 2025
17:00

North Macedonia	2–1	Armenia
Trajkov 54', 83'	Report	Hovhannisyan 38'

Petar Miloševski Football Stadium, Bitola
Attendance: 1,890
Referee: Luka Bilbija (Bosnia and Herzegovina)
10 October 2025
18:00

Poland	2–0	Montenegro
Kozubal 4'; Pietuszewski 23'	Report

Arena Katowice, Katowice
Attendance: 4,274
Referee: Joonas Jaanovits (Estonia)
10 October 2025
18:15

Italy	4–0	Sweden
Pisilli 12', 45+3'; Camarda 40' (pen.); Berti 90+3' (pen.)	Report

Stadio Dino Manuzzi, Cesena
Attendance: 4,200
Referee: Matthias Jöllenbeck (Germany)

14 October 2025
18:00

Sweden	0–6	Poland
	Report	Pieńko 6', 31' (pen.), 90+3'; Urbański 45+2'; Kozubal 83'; Krajewski 89'

Stadsparksvallen, Jönköping
Attendance: 1,618
Referee: Oguzhan Çakir (Turkey)
14 October 2025
18:00

Montenegro	3–2	North Macedonia
Perišić 56'; Juković 68'; Mrvaljević 73'	Report	Meliqi 13'; Trajkov 90+1'

Stadion Tuško Polje, Tuzi
Attendance: 812
Referee: Kyriakos Athanasiou (Cyprus)
14 October 2025
18:15

Italy	5–1	Armenia
Dagasso 59'; Camarda 62', 72'; Fini 75'; Ekhator 90+1'	Report	Vardanyan 78'

Stadio Giovanni Zini, Cremona
Attendance: 2,500
Referee: Gal Levi (Israel)

13 November 2025
17:00

North Macedonia	1–4	Sweden
Elezi 12'	Report	Omorowa 32', 33'; Sonko 60'; Boudri 79'

Petar Miloševski Stadium, Bitola
Attendance: 928
Referee: Kevin O'Sullivan (Ireland)
14 November 2025
12:00 (15:00 UTC+4)

Armenia	1–2	Montenegro
Afyan 37'	Report	Perišić 25' (pen.); Mrvaljević 55'

Hakob Tonoyan Stadium, Armavir
Attendance: 800
Referee: Karel Rouček (Czechia)
14 November 2025
16:00

Poland	2–1	Italy
Bogacz 83'; Kuziemka 87'	Report	Pisilli 61'

Stadion Miejski im. Floriana Krygiera, Szczecin
Attendance: 19,177
Referee: Antoni Bandić (Bosnia and Herzegovina)

18 November 2025
12:00 (15:00 UTC+4)

Armenia	0–1	Sweden
	Report	Sonko 23'

Yerevan Football Academy Stadium, Yerevan
Attendance: 600
Referee: Rareș George Vidican (Romania)
18 November 2025
17:00

North Macedonia	0–1	Poland
	Report	Kocaba 33'

Petar Miloševski Stadium, Bitola
Attendance: 312
Referee: Gergő Bogár (Hungary)
18 November 2025
18:30

Montenegro	1–4	Italy
Mrvaljević 37'	Report	Pisilli 42'; Dagasso 60'; Camarda 64'; Fini 74'

City Stadium Nikšić, Nikšić
Attendance: 300
Referee: Miguel Nogueira (Portugal)

26 March 2026
18:15

Italy	4–0	North Macedonia
Ndour 3'; Lipani 49'; Ekhator 50'; Fini 86' (pen.)	Report

Stadio Carlo Castellani, Empoli
Attendance: 1,485
Referee: David Dickinson (Scotland)
27 March 2026
18:00

Poland	4–1	Armenia
Reguła 43'; Kozubal 48' (pen.), 78' (pen.); Mikołajewski 90+1'	Report	Hakobyan 69' (pen.)

Stadion im. Braci Czachorów, Radom
Attendance: 13,007
Referee: Vitālijs Spasjoņņikovs (Latvia)
27 March 2026
18:30

Sweden	2–2	Montenegro
Rafferty 34'; Amoran 86'	Report	Mrvaljević 20'; Adžić 35'

Borås Arena, Borås
Attendance: 711
Referee: Jamie Robinson (Northern Ireland)

31 March 2026
14:00

Montenegro	0–1	Poland
	Report	Krajewski 37'

Stadion Tuško Polje, Tuzi
Attendance: 330
Referee: Alexandros Tsakalidis (Greece)
31 March 2026
15:00 (17:00 UTC+4)

Armenia	0–2	North Macedonia
	Report	Gjorgievski 45' (pen.); Latifi 75'

Yerevan Football Academy Stadium, Yerevan
Attendance: 500
Referee: Menelaos Antoniou (Cypus)
31 March 2026
18:30

Sweden	0–4	Italy
	Report	Koleosho 19' (pen.), 22'; Ndour 50'; Lipani 63'

Borås Arena, Borås
Attendance: 1,105
Referee: Simon Bourdeaud'hui (Belgium)

30 September 2026
18:00

Poland	3–0	Sweden
Mazurek 41', 58'; Bąk 90+1'	Report

Arena Katowice, Katowice
Attendance: 5,237
Referee: Danilo Nikolić (Serbia)
1 October 2026
18:00

North Macedonia	1–1	Montenegro
Latifi 58' (pen.)	Report	Kostić 44'

Petar Miloševski Football Stadium, Bitola
Attendance: 4,138
Referee: Arnes Talic (Austria)
1 October 2026
18:30 (20:30 UTC+4)

Armenia	0–1	Italy
	Report	Cisse 90+5'

Yerevan Football Academy Stadium, Yerevan
Attendance: 1,000
Referee: Fotios Polychronis (Greece)

5 October 2026
16:30

Montenegro	1–1	Armenia
Perišić 20'	Report	Hakobyan 65'

DG Arena, Podgorica
Attendance: 146
Referee: Andrei Chivulete (Romania)
5 October 2026
18:15

Italy	6–2	Poland
Koleosho 16'; Ndour 27', 54'; Lipani 59'; Fini 66'; Cherubini 86'	Report	Mikołajewski 65'; Żewłakow 85'

Stadio Adriatico – Giovanni Cornacchia, Pescara
Attendance: 9,414
Referee: Florian Badstübner (Germany)
5 October 2026
18:30

Sweden	2–0	North Macedonia
Svensson 15'; Njie 52'	Report

Falcon Alkoholfri Arena, Falkenberg
Attendance: 912
Referee: Kamal Umudlu (Azerbaijan)

== Goalscorers ==
There were 98 goals scored in 30 matches, for an average of 3.27 goals per match.

4 goals

- (Italy national under-21 football team) Francesco Camarda
- (Italy national under-21 football team) Seydou Fini
- (Italy national under-21 football team) Luca Koleosho
- (Italy national under-21 football team) Luca Lipani
- (Italy national under-21 football team) Cher Ndour
- (Italy national under-21 football team) Niccolò Pisilli
- (Montenegro national under-21 football team) Balša Mrvaljević
- (Poland national under-21 football team) Antoni Kozubal
- (Poland national under-21 football team) Oskar Pietuszewski

3 goals

- (Montenegro national under-21 football team) Vladimir Perišić
- (North Macedonia national under-21 football team) Dimitar Trajkov
- (Poland national under-21 football team) Tomasz Pieńko

2 goals

- (Armenia national under-21 football team) Davit Hakobyan
- (Italy national under-21 football team) Matteo Dagasso
- (Italy national under-21 football team) Jeff Ekhator
- (Montenegro national under-21 football team) Andrej Kostić
- (North Macedonia national under-21 football team) Admir Latifi
- (Poland national under-21 football team) Wiktor Bogacz
- (Poland national under-21 football team) Marcel Krajewski
- (Poland national under-21 football team) Bartosz Mazurek
- (Poland national under-21 football team) Daniel Mikołajewski
- (Poland national under-21 football team) Marcel Reguła
- (Sweden men's national under-21 football team) Richie Omorowa
- (Sweden men's national under-21 football team) Momodou Sonko

1 goal

- (Armenia national under-21 football team) Vyacheslav Afyan
- (Armenia national under-21 football team) Narek Hovhannisyan
- (Armenia national under-21 football team) Edik Vardanyan
- (Italy national under-21 football team) Tommaso Berti
- (Italy national under-21 football team) Luigi Cherubini
- (Italy national under-21 football team) Alphadjo Cisse
- (Italy national under-21 football team) Luca Marianucci
- (Montenegro national under-21 football team) Vasilije Adžić
- (Montenegro national under-21 football team) Viktor Đukanović
- (Montenegro national under-21 football team) Medo Juković
- (Montenegro national under-21 football team) Danilo Vukanić
- (North Macedonia national under-21 football team) Dashmir Elezi
- (North Macedonia national under-21 football team) Martin Gjorgievski
- (North Macedonia national under-21 football team) Anes Meliqi
- (Poland national under-21 football team) Daniel Bąk
- (Poland national under-21 football team) Filip Kocaba
- (Poland national under-21 football team) Maciej Kuziemka
- (Poland national under-21 football team) Miłosz Matysik
- (Poland national under-21 football team) Kacper Urbański
- (Poland national under-21 football team) Jakub Żewłakow
- (Sweden men's national under-21 football team) Jeremy Agbonifo
- (Sweden men's national under-21 football team) Peter Amoran
- (Sweden men's national under-21 football team) Roony Bardghji
- (Sweden men's national under-21 football team) Amin Boudri
- (Sweden men's national under-21 football team) Jonah Kusi-Asare
- (Sweden men's national under-21 football team) Alieu Njie
- (Sweden men's national under-21 football team) Marcus Rafferty
- (Sweden men's national under-21 football team) Victor Svensson

1 own goal

- (North Macedonia national under-21 football team) Adrian Zendelovski (against Poland)
