= Jakub Jakubko =

Slovak footballer

Personal information
- Full name: Jakub Jakubko
- Date of birth: 24 August 2004 (age 22)
- Place of birth: Slovakia
- Position: Centre back

Team information
- Current team: Teplice
- Number: 5

Youth career
- TJ OK Chmiňany
- Tatran Prešov
- Poprad
- Košice

Senior career*
Years	Team	Apps	(Gls)
2022−2025	Košice	49	(2)
2024	→ Petržalka (loan)	13	(2)
2025−	Teplice	9	(0)

International career^{‡}
2022	Slovakia U19	2	(0)
2023−	Slovakia U21	5	(0)
- * Club domestic league appearances and goals as of 27 May 2026 ‡ National team caps and goals as of 20 June 2023

Jakub Jakubko (born 24 August 2004) is a Slovak footballer who plays for Teplice of the Czech First League as a centre back.

== Club career ==
=== FC Košice ===
Jakubko made his professional Niké Liga debut for FC Košice against ŠK Slovan Bratislava on 29 July 2023, in a home fixture at Košická futbalová aréna.

=== FK Teplice ===
On 19 August 2025, Jakubko signed a contract with Czech First League club Teplice until 2029.
