= 1998 UEFA European Under-21 Championship =

Campionatul European de Fotbal sub 21 UEFA 1998

Tournament details
- Host country: Romania
- Dates: 23–31 May
- Teams: 8 (from 1 confederation)
- Venues: 3 (in 1 host city)

Final positions
- Champions: Spain (2nd title)
- Runners-up: Greece
- Third place: Norway
- Fourth place: Netherlands

Tournament statistics
- Matches played: 12
- Goals scored: 22 (1.83 per match)
- Top scorer(s): (Norway) Steffen Iversen (Greece) Nikos Liberopoulos (3 goals)
- Best player: (Spain) Francesc Arnau

The 1998 UEFA European Under-21 Championship, which spanned two years (1996–98), had 46 entrants. Before the quarter-finals stage, Romania were chosen as the hosts of the final stages, consisting of four matches in total.

The exclusion (for political reasons) of the team from Serbia and Montenegro, then known as the Federal Republic of Yugoslavia ended. Bosnia and Herzegovina was another former state of Yugoslavia who competed, for the first time. Spain won the competition for the second time.

The 46 national teams were divided into nine groups (eight groups of 5 + one group of 6). The records of the nine group winners were compared, and the eighth and ninth ranked teams played-off against each other for the eight quarter finals spot. One of the eight quarter-finalist were then chosen to host the remaining fixtures.

== Qualification ==
The qualifying stage for the 1998 UEFA European Under-21 Championship saw Germany, Netherlands, Norway, Romania, Russia, Spain and Sweden win their respective groups. Greece and England finished first in their group but were the two worst first placed group winners. Greece defeated England in a playoff to qualify for the tournament.

=== Qualified teams ===
Country	Qualified as	Previous appearances in tournament^{1} ^{2}
Norway	Group 3 Winner	0 (Debut)
Sweden	Group 4 Winner	3 (1986, 1990, 1992)
Russia	Group 5 Winner	1 (1994)
Spain	Group 6 Winner	7 (1982, 1984, **1986**, 1988, 1990, 1994, 1996)
Netherlands	Group 7 Winner	2 (1988, 1992)
Romania	Group 8 Winner	0 (Debut)
Germany	Group 9 Winner	2 (1992, 1996)
Greece	Playoff Winner	1 (1988, 1994)

^{1} Bold indicates champion for that year

== Venues ==
The final tournament was held in Bucharest, the hosts being only three arenas.

Location of grounds in Bucharest.	Bucharest (Vatra Luminoasă)	Bucharest (Ghencea)
Location of grounds in Bucharest.	Stadionul Lia Manoliu	Stadionul Steaua
Location of grounds in Bucharest.	Capacity: **60,120**	Capacity: **28,365**
Location of grounds in Bucharest.	Bucharest (Cotroceni)	
Location of grounds in Bucharest.	Stadionul Cotroceni	
Location of grounds in Bucharest.	Capacity: **14,542**	

== Match officials ==
Country	Referee
FR Yugoslavia	Miroslav Radoman
Luxembourg	Alain Hamer
Senegal	Falla N'Doye
Slovakia	Ľuboš Micheľ
Turkey	Metin Tokat

== Squads ==
Only players born on or after 1 January 1975 were eligible to play in the tournament. Each nation had to submit a squad of 20 players, two of which had to be goalkeepers. If a player was injured seriously enough to prevent his taking part in the tournament before his team's first match, he can be replaced by another player.

== Results ==
=== Bracket ===
5th-place match (30 May)
**Germany**	**2**
Sweden	1
7th-place match (30 May)
Romania	1
**Russia**	**2**

5th–8th place (26–27 May)
Romania	0
**Germany (aet)**	**1**
**Sweden**	**2**
Russia	0

Quarter-finals (23–24 May)
**Netherlands**	**2**
Romania	1
Germany	0
**Greece**	**1**
**Norway**	**1**
Sweden	0
**Spain**	**1**
Russia	0

Semi-finals (26–27 May)
Netherlands	0
**Greece**	**3**
Norway	0
**Spain (aet)**	**1**

Final (31 May)
Greece	0
**Spain**	**1**
3rd-place match (31 May)
Netherlands	0
**Norway**	**2**

=== Quarter-finals ===
23 May 1998

Germany	0–1	Greece
	Report	Karagounis 57'

Stadionul Cotroceni, Bucharest
Attendance: 4,000
Referee: Ľuboš Micheľ (Slovakia)

23 May 1998
19:30

Netherlands	2–1	Romania
Wooter 16' de Jong 79'	Report	Contra 7'

Stadionul Steaua, Bucharest
Attendance: 15,000
Referee: Metin Tokat (Turkey)

24 May 1998

Spain	1–0	Russia
Iván Pérez 84'	Report

Stadionul Cotroceni, Bucharest
Attendance: 1,500
Referee: Miroslav Radoman (FR Yugoslavia)

24 May 1998

Norway	1–0	Sweden
Iversen 45'	Report

Stadionul Steaua, Bucharest
Referee: Alain Hamer (Luxembourg)

=== 5th-8th places ===
26 May 1998

Romania	0–1 (a.e.t.)	Germany
	Report	Schwarz 101'

Stadionul Cotroceni, Bucharest
Attendance: 1,600
Referee: Alain Hamer (Luxembourg)

27 May 1998

Russia	0–2	Sweden
	Report	Mellberg 15'; Bärlin 68'

Stadionul Steaua, Bucharest
Attendance: 150
Referee: Falla N'Doye (Senegal)

=== Semi-finals ===
26 May 1998

Spain	1–0 (a.e.t.)	Norway
Víctor 94'	Report

Stadionul Cotroceni, Bucharest
Referee: Ľuboš Micheľ (Slovakia)

26 May 1998
20:00

Netherlands	0–3	Greece
	Report	Liberopoulos 21', 90'; Antzas 57'

Stadionul Steaua, Bucharest
Attendance: 5,000
Referee: Miroslav Radoman (FR Yugoslavia)

=== 7th place ===
30 May 1998
16:00

Russia	2–1	Romania
Osinov 48'; Laktionov 64'	Report	Trică 45'

Stadionul Lia Manoliu, Bucharest
Attendance: 250
Referee: Falla N'Doye (Senegal)

=== 5th place ===
30 May 1998
19:00

Germany	2–1	Sweden
Brdarić 71'; Frings 77'	Report	Åslund 88'

Stadionul Lia Manoliu, Bucharest
Attendance: 1,000
Referee: Miroslav Radoman (FR Yugoslavia)

=== Third place ===
31 May 1998
14:00

Netherlands	0–2	Norway
	Report	Iversen 17', 74'

Stadionul Cotroceni, Bucharest
Attendance: 4,000
Referee: Metin Tokat (Turkey)

=== Final ===
31 May 1998
20:00

Greece	0–1	Spain
	Report	Iván Pérez 65'

Stadionul Steaua, Bucharest
Attendance: 6,000
Referee: Ľuboš Micheľ (Slovakia)
