= 2002 UEFA European Under-21 Championship =

U-21-Fußball-Europameisterschaft 2002 Championnat d'Europe de football espoirs 2002 Campionato europeo di calcio Under-21 2002 Campiunadis Europeans da ballape U21 2002

Tournament details
- Host country: Switzerland
- Dates: 16–28 May
- Teams: 8 (finals); 47 (qualifying)
- Venue: 4 (in 4 host cities)

Final positions
- Champions: Czech Republic (1st title)
- Runners-up: France

Tournament statistics
- Matches played: 15
- Goals scored: 35 (2.33 per match)
- Attendance: 174,195 (11,613 per match)
- Top scorer: (Italy) Massimo Maccarone (3 goals)
- Best player: (Czech Republic) Petr Čech

UEFA European Under-21 Championship 2002 was the 13th staging of UEFA's European Under-21 Championship. The final tournament was hosted by Switzerland between 16 and 28 May 2002.

Czech Republic U-21s won the competition for the first time.

== Qualification ==
The 47 national teams were divided into nine groups (one group of four, five groups of 5, and three groups of 6). The records of the nine group runners-up were then compared. The top seven joined the nine winners in a play-off for the eight finals spots. One of the eight qualifiers was then chosen to host the remaining fixtures.

== Venues ==
Switzerland
| Zürich | Basel |
|---|---|
| Hardturm | St. Jakob-Park |
| Capacity: 17,666 | Capacity: 37,500 |
2002 UEFA European Under-21 Championship is located in Switzerland
| Geneva | Lausanne |
| Charmilles Stadium | Stade Olympique de la Pontaise |
| Capacity: 9,250 | Capacity: 15,700 |

== Matches ==
=== Group stage ===
==== Group A ====
| Team | Pld | W | D | L | GF | GA | GD | Pts |
|---|---|---|---|---|---|---|---|---|
| Italy | 3 | 1 | 2 | 0 | 3 | 2 | +1 | 5 |
| Switzerland | 3 | 1 | 1 | 1 | 3 | 2 | +1 | 4 |
| Portugal | 3 | 1 | 1 | 1 | 4 | 4 | 0 | 4 |
| England | 3 | 1 | 0 | 2 | 4 | 6 | −2 | 3 |

17 May 2002
20:15

| England | 2–1 | Switzerland |
|---|---|---|
| Defoe 3'; Crouch 53' | Report | Frei 58' |

Hardturm, Zürich
Attendance: 15,000
Referee: Attila Hanacsek (Hungary)
17 May 2002
20:30

| Italy | 1–1 | Portugal |
|---|---|---|
| Bonazzoli 57' | Report | Postiga 48' |

St. Jakob-Park, Basel
Attendance: 10,100
Referee: Bernhard Brugger (Austria)

20 May 2002
17:00

| Portugal | 0–2 | Switzerland |
|---|---|---|
| | Report | Cabanas 60' (pen.); Frei 73' |

Hardturm, Zürich
Attendance: 16,066
Referee: Tom Henning Øvrebø (Norway)
20 May 2002
20:30

| Italy | 2–1 | England |
|---|---|---|
| Maccarone 58', 84' | Report | Barry 64' |

St. Jakob-Park, Basel
Attendance: 12,980
Referee: Eduardo Iturralde González (Spain)

22 May 2002
20:30

| Switzerland | 0–0 | Italy |
|---|---|---|
| | Report |

St. Jakob-Park, Basel
Attendance: 30,000
Referee: Jacek Granat (Poland)
22 May 2002
20:30

| Portugal | 3–1 | England |
|---|---|---|
| Teixeira 7'; Makukula 20' (pen.); Viana 69' | Report | Smith 43' |

Hardturm, Zürich
Attendance: 5,640
Referee: Erol Ersoy (Turkey)

==== Group B ====
| Team | Pld | W | D | L | GF | GA | GD | Pts |
|---|---|---|---|---|---|---|---|---|
| France | 3 | 3 | 0 | 0 | 7 | 1 | +6 | 9 |
| Czech Republic | 3 | 1 | 1 | 1 | 2 | 3 | −1 | 4 |
| Belgium | 3 | 1 | 0 | 2 | 2 | 4 | −2 | 3 |
| Greece | 3 | 0 | 1 | 2 | 3 | 6 | −3 | 1 |

16 May 2002
19:00

| France | 2–0 | Czech Republic |
|---|---|---|
| Govou 41'; Sorlin 45' | Report |

Les Charmilles, Geneva
Attendance: 5,500
Referee: Erol Ersoy (Turkey)
16 May 2002
20:00

| Greece | 1–2 | Belgium |
|---|---|---|
| Gittas 90+2' | Report | Daerden 33'; Soetaers 83' |

Stade Olympique de la Pontaise, Lausanne
Attendance: 1,950
Referee: Jacek Granat (Poland)

19 May 2002
16:00

| Belgium | 0–1 | Czech Republic |
|---|---|---|
| | Report | Jiránek 19' |

Les Charmilles, Geneva
Attendance: 2,015
Referee: Felix Tangawarima (Zimbabwe)
19 May 2002
16:30

| Greece | 1–3 | France |
|---|---|---|
| Patsatzoglou 84' | Report | Armand 37'; Frau 40', 61' |

Stade Olympique de la Pontaise, Lausanne
Attendance: 8,815
Referee: Franz-Xaver Wack (Germany)

21 May 2002
20:30

| Czech Republic | 1–1 | Greece |
|---|---|---|
| Grygera 36' (pen.) | Report | Kyriazis 69' |

Stade Olympique de la Pontaise, Lausanne
Attendance: 1,150
Referee: Attila Hanacsek (Hungary)
21 May 2002
20:30

| Belgium | 0–2 | France |
|---|---|---|
| | Report | Daerden 74' (o.g.); Luyindula 86' |

Les Charmilles, Geneva
Attendance: 7,179
Referee: Bernhard Brugger (Austria)

=== Knockout stage ===
Semi-finals
25 May – Basel
France | 2
Switzerland | 0
25 May – Zürich
Czech Republic (a.e.t.) | 3
Italy | 2

Final
28 May – Basel
France | 0 (1)
Czech Republic (p) | 0 (3)

==== Semi-finals ====
25 May 2002
18:30

| France | 2–0 | Switzerland |
|---|---|---|
| Malbranque 62'; Sorlin 70' | Report |

St. Jakob-Park, Basel
Attendance: 26,900
Referee: Eduardo Iturralde González (Spain)

25 May 2002
20:30

| Czech Republic | 3–2 (a.e.t.) | Italy |
|---|---|---|
| Rozehnal 1'; Pospíšil 83' 99' | Report | Pirlo 86' (pen.); Maccarone 90+4' |

Hardturm, Zürich
Attendance: 10,500
Referee: Franz-Xaver Wack (Germany)

==== Final ====
28 May 2002
20:30

| France | 0–0 (a.e.t.) | Czech Republic |
|---|---|---|
| | Report |
Penalties
| Meriem (penalty scored); Frau (penalty missed); Escudé (penalty missed); Boumsong (penalty missed) | 1–3 | (penalty scored) Pospíšil; (penalty scored) Grygera; (penalty scored) Skácel |

St. Jakob-Park, Basel
Attendance: 20,400
Referee: Tom Henning Øvrebø (Norway)

| GK | 1 | Mickaël Landreau |
| DF | 2 | Anthony Réveillère | (yellow card) 33' |
| DF | 4 | Jean-Alain Boumsong |
| DF | 6 | Jérémie Bréchet |
| DF | 3 | Julien Escudé |
| MF | 10 | Steed Malbranque | | (substituted off) 64' |
| MF | 18 | Benoît Pedretti |
| MF | 5 | Mathieu Berson | (yellow card) 77' | (substituted off) 87' |
| MF | 7 | Olivier Sorlin |
| FW | 11 | Péguy Luyindula |
| FW | 9 | Sidney Govou | | (substituted off) 76' |
Substitutions:
| MF | 19 | Camel Meriem | | (substituted in) 64' |
| FW | 13 | Pierre-Alain Frau | | (substituted in) 76' |
| MF | 8 | Julien Sablé | | (substituted in) 87' |
Coach:
(France) Raymond Domenech

| GK | 16 | Petr Čech |
| DF | 17 | Tomáš Hübschman |
| DF | 2 | Martin Jiránek | | (substituted off) 33' |
| DF | 14 | David Rozehnal |
| DF | 5 | Zdeněk Grygera |
| MF | 13 | Karel Piták | (yellow card) 89' |
| MF | 8 | Lukáš Zelenka | | (substituted off) 81' |
| MF | 4 | Petr Voříšek |
| MF | 19 | Rudolf Skácel |
| FW | 9 | Milan Baroš | | (substituted off) 38' |
| FW | 10 | Štěpán Vachoušek |
Substitutions:
| MF | 20 | Radoslav Kováč | | (substituted in) 33' |
| MF | 11 | Michal Pospíšil | | (substituted in) 38' |
| MF | 15 | Jan Polák | | (substituted in) 81' |
Coach:
(Czech Republic) Miroslav Beránek

Assistant referees:
Markku Tiensuu (Finland)
Martin Balko (Slovakia)
Fourth official:
Bernhard Brugger (Austria)

== Goalscorers ==
3 goals

- (Italy) Massimo Maccarone

2 goals

- (Czech Republic) Michal Pospíšil
- (France) Pierre-Alain Frau
- (France) Olivier Sorlin
- (Switzerland) Alexander Frei

1 goal

- (Belgium) Koen Daerden
- (Belgium) Tom Soetaers
- (Czech Republic) Zdeněk Grygera
- (Czech Republic) Martin Jiránek
- (Czech Republic) David Rozehnal
- (England) Gareth Barry
- (England) Peter Crouch
- (England) Jermain Defoe
- (England) Alan Smith

1 goal, cont.

- (France) Sylvain Armand
- (France) Sidney Govou
- (France) Péguy Luyindula
- (France) Steed Malbranque
- (Greece) Xenofon Gittas
- (Greece) Giorgos Kyriazis
- (Greece) Christos Patsatzoglou
- (Italy) Emiliano Bonazzoli
- (Italy) Andrea Pirlo
- (Portugal) Ariza Makukula
- (Portugal) Hélder Postiga
- (Portugal) Filipe Teixeira
- (Portugal) Hugo Viana
- (Switzerland) Ricardo Cabanas

Own goals

- (Belgium) Koen Daerden (for France)
