= 2025 UEFA European Under-21 Championship qualification play-offs =

The play-offs of the 2025 UEFA European Under-21 Championship qualifying competition involves six of the nine runners-up in the qualifying group stage, the three top-ranked teams being directly qualified for the tournament.

== Ranking of second-placed teams ==
Because two groups have one fewer team than the others, only the results of the second-placed teams against the first, third, fourth, and fifth-placed teams in their group are taken into account, while results against the sixth-placed team in six-team groups are not included. As a result, eight matches played by each second-placed team are counted for the purposes of determining the ranking. The top three teams qualify directly for the final tournament, while the other six teams enter the play-offs.

Pos	Grp	Team	Pld	W	D	L	GF	GA	GD	Pts	Qualification
1	F	Ukraine	8	6	0	2	16	7	+9	18	Final tournament
2	H	France	8	5	1	2	22	6	+16	16	Final tournament
3	D	Poland	8	5	1	2	20	8	+12	16	Final tournament
4	G	Croatia	8	5	1	2	15	14	+1	16	Play-offs
5	E	Finland	8	4	2	2	12	7	+5	14	Play-offs
6	I	Czech Republic	8	4	2	2	13	11	+2	14	Play-offs
7	A	Norway	8	4	1	3	17	11	+6	13	Play-offs
8	B	Belgium	8	4	1	3	8	5	+3	13	Play-offs
9	C	Georgia	8	4	1	3	10	10	0	13	Play-offs

Rules for classification: 1) points; 2) goal difference; 3) goals scored; 4) away goals scored; 5) wins; 6) away wins; 7) disciplinary points; 8) coefficient ranking.

== Draw ==
The draw for the play-offs was held on 17 October 2024 in Nyon, Switzerland.

== Summary ==
The three play-off winners qualify for the final tournament.

Team 1	Agg.	Team 2	1st leg	2nd leg
Finland	6–3	Norway	5–1	1–2
Belgium	1–3	Czech Republic	0–2	1–1
Georgia	3–3 (7–6 p)	Croatia	1–0	2–3 (a.e.t.)

== Matches ==
All times are CET (UTC+1), as listed by UEFA (local times, if different, are in parentheses).

15 November 2024
18:45 (19:45 EET)

Finland	5–1	Norway
Walta 2'; Terho 4'; Talvitie 79'; Skyttä 82'; Galvez 86'	Report	Arnstad 42'

Tammelan Stadion, Tampere
Attendance: 5,275
Referee: Alessandro Dudic (Switzerland)
19 November 2024
18:30

Norway	2–1	Finland
Mvuka 81'; Broholm 88'	Report	Terho 55'

Viking Stadion, Stavanger
Attendance: 1,813
Referee: John Brooks (England)

Finland won 6–3 on aggregate.

15 November 2024
20:00

Belgium	0–2	Czech Republic
	Report	Karabec 34'; Fila 80'

Den Dreef, Leuven
Attendance: 1,200
Referee: Atilla Karaoğlan (Turkey)
19 November 2024
17:30

Czech Republic	1–1	Belgium
Van Den Bosch 79' (o.g.)	Report	Steuckers 51'

Všesportovní stadion, Hradec Králové
Attendance: 9,019
Referee: Manfredas Lukjančukas (Lithuania)

Czech Republic won 3–1 on aggregate.

15 November 2024
16:00 (19:00 GET)

Georgia	1–0	Croatia
Soldo 4' (o.g.)	Report

Mikheil Meskhi Stadium, Tbilisi
Attendance: 9,372
Referee: Adam Ladebäck (Sweden)
19 November 2024
19:00

Croatia	3–2 (a.e.t.)	Georgia
Beljo 10', 63' (pen.); Šotiček 90+1'	Report	Gagnidze 28'; Lominadze 78'
Penalties
Vidović (penalty scored); Frigan (penalty scored); Stojković (penalty scored); Vušković (penalty scored); Hodža (penalty missed); Biuk (penalty scored); Šotiček (penalty scored); Badelj (penalty missed)	6–7	(penalty missed) Azarovi; (penalty scored) Kvernadze; (penalty scored) Abuashvili; (penalty scored) Lominadze; (penalty scored) Mamageishvili; (penalty scored) Latsabidze; (penalty scored) Ugrekhelidze; (penalty scored) Khvadagiani

Stadion Rujevica, Rijeka
Attendance: 2,575
Referee: Simone Sozza (Italy)

3–3 on aggregate, Georgia won 7–6 on penalties.
