= 2025 UEFA European Under-21 Championship qualification Group H =

Football tournament group stage

Group H of the 2025 UEFA European Under-21 Championship qualifying competition consists of five teams: France, Austria, Slovenia, Bosnia and Herzegovina, and Cyprus. The composition of the nine groups in the qualifying group stage was decided by the draw held on 2 February 2023 at the UEFA headquarters in Nyon, Switzerland, with the teams seeded according to their coefficient ranking.

== Standings ==
Pos	Team	Pld	W	D	L	GF	GA	GD	Pts	Qualification	Slovenia	France	Austria	Cyprus	Bosnia and Herzegovina
1	Slovenia	8	5	2	1	13	7	+6	17	Final tournament	—	0–4	1–0	2–0	3–0
2	France	8	5	1	2	22	6	+16	16	Final tournament	1–1	—	1–2	9–0	2–0
3	Austria	8	4	3	1	12	6	+6	15		1–1	2–0	—	2–2	2–0
4	Cyprus	8	1	2	5	7	23	−16	5		0–3	0–3	1–1	—	1–2
5	Bosnia and Herzegovina	8	1	0	7	5	17	−12	3		1–2	1–2	0–2	1–3	—

Source: UEFA
Rules for classification: Tiebreakers

== Matches ==
Times are CET/CEST, (Note: CEST (UTC+2) for dates between 26 March and 29 October 2023 and between 31 March and 27 October 2024, and CET (UTC+1) for all other dates.) as listed by UEFA (local times, if different, are in parentheses).

7 September 2023
18:45

Bosnia and Herzegovina	1–2	Slovenia
Bristrić 53'	Report	Begić 68'; T. Cipot 72'

Stadion Grbavica, Sarajevo
Attendance: 500
Referee: Kári Á Høvdanum (Faroe Islands)
7 September 2023
19:00 (20:00 EEST)

Cyprus	1–1	Austria
Gavriel 76'	Report	Ballo 56'

Dasaki Stadium, Dasaki Achnas
Attendance: 321
Referee: Ante Čulina (Croatia)

11 September 2023
18:00

Slovenia	0–4	France
	Report	Barcola 45+1', 57'; Cherki 50'; Mara 88'

Bonifika Stadium, Koper
Attendance: 1,994
Referee: Ondřej Berka (Czech Republic)

12 September 2023
18:00

Austria	2–0	Bosnia and Herzegovina
Querfeld 63'; Bischof 66'	Report

Josko Arena, Ried im Innkreis
Attendance: 2,650
Referee: Miguel Nogueira (Portugal)

13 October 2023
18:00 (19:00 EEST)

Cyprus	0–3	Slovenia
	Report	T. Cipot 6', 23'; Flakus Bosilj 76'

Dasaki Stadium, Dasaki Achnas
Attendance: 270
Referee: David Munro (Scotland)
13 October 2023
18:45

Bosnia and Herzegovina	1–2	France
Bristrić 28'	Report	Cherki 32'; Kalimuendo 90+2'

Stadion Grbavica, Sarajevo
Attendance: 1,500
Referee: Mohammad Al-Emara (Finland)

17 October 2023
18:00

Slovenia	1–0	Austria
Sešlar 47'	Report

Fazanerija City Stadium, Murska Sobota
Attendance: 1,217
Referee: Visar Kastrati (Kosovo)
17 October 2023
18:30

France	9–0	Cyprus
Antoniou 13' (o.g.); Kalimuendo 30' (pen.), 45'; Akliouche 39'; Matsima 57'; Cherki 65', 80'; Tel 69', 90+3'	Report

Stade des Alpes, Grenoble
Attendance: 10,271
Referee: Miloš Bošković (Montenegro)

17 November 2023
17:00 (18:00 EET)

Cyprus	1–2	Bosnia and Herzegovina
Okkas 17'	Report	Kulašin 58'; Sabljić 79'

Antonis Papadopoulos Stadium, Larnaca
Attendance: 173
Referee: Ivo Torres (Luxembourg)
17 November 2023
18:30

Austria	2–0	France
Koller 25', 75'	Report

Josko Arena, Ried im Innkreis
Attendance: 2,655
Referee: Robert Jones (England)

22 March 2024
18:00

Slovenia	3–0	Bosnia and Herzegovina
T. Cipot 30'; Zeljković 37'; Pišek 90+2'	Report

Fazanerija City Stadium, Murska Sobota
Attendance: 1,024
Referee: Elchin Masiyev (Azerbaijan)

26 March 2024
18:00

Austria	2–2	Cyprus
Kittos 65' (o.g.); Riegler 90+9'	Report	Savva 52'; Satsias 90'

Josko Arena, Ried im Innkreis
Attendance: 1,400
Referee: Ondřej Berka (Czech Republic)

6 September 2024
18:00

Bosnia and Herzegovina	0–2	Austria
	Report	Seidl 56', 77'

Stadion Grbavica, Sarajevo
Attendance: 573
Referee: Elchin Masiyev (Azerbaijan)
6 September 2024
18:30

France	1–1	Slovenia
Doué 54'	Report	T. Cipot 37'

Stade Raymond Kopa, Angers
Attendance: 6,419
Referee: José Luis Munuera (Spain)

10 September 2024
18:00

Slovenia	2–0	Cyprus
Koutsakos 27' (o.g.); T. Cipot 84'	Report

Fazanerija City Stadium, Murska Sobota
Attendance: 753
Referee: Genc Nuza (Kosovo)
10 September 2024
18:30

France	2–0	Bosnia and Herzegovina
Akliouche 35'; Ekitike 57' (pen.)	Report

MMArena, Le Mans
Attendance: 5,354
Referee: Goga Kikacheishvili (Georgia)

11 October 2024
18:30

Cyprus	0–3	France
	Report	Ekitike 18'; Akliouche 68'; Nianzou 89'

Ethnikos Achnas, Achna
Attendance: 283
Referee: Ion Orlic (Moldova)
11 October 2024
20:30

Austria	1–1	Slovenia
Ballo 56' (pen.)	Report	Gradišar 65'

Stadion Wiener Neustadt, Wiener Neustadt
Attendance: 1,000
Referee: Luca Cibelli (Switzerland)

15 October 2024
16:00

Bosnia and Herzegovina	1–3	Cyprus
Buljubašić 44'	Report	Koutsakos 45+2'; Satsias 47', 67'

Stadion Grbavica, Sarajevo
Attendance: 120
Referee: Peiman Simani (Finland)
15 October 2024
18:30

France	1–2	Austria
Kalimuendo 86'	Report	Hedl 59'; Ballo 74'

Stade Marcel Picot, Nancy
Attendance: 8,471
Referee: Mihály Káprály (Hungary)

== Goalscorers ==
There have been 59 goals scored in 20 matches, for an average of 2.95 goals per match.

6 goals

- (Slovenia) Tio Cipot

4 goals

- (France) Rayan Cherki
- (France) Arnaud Kalimuendo

3 goals

- (Austria) Thierno Ballo
- (Cyprus) Giannis Satsias
- (France) Maghnes Akliouche

2 goals

- (Austria) Paul-Friedrich Koller
- (Austria) Simon Seidl
- (Bosnia and Herzegovina) Admir Bristrić
- (France) Bradley Barcola
- (France) Hugo Ekitike
- (France) Mathys Tel

1 goal

- (Austria) Noah Bischof
- (Austria) Tobias Hedl
- (Austria) Leopold Querfeld
- (Austria) David Riegler
- (Bosnia and Herzegovina) Muhamed Buljubašić
- (Bosnia and Herzegovina) Enver Kulašin
- (Bosnia and Herzegovina) Franko Sabljić
- (Cyprus) Stavros Gavriel
- (Cyprus) Nikolas Koutsakos
- (Cyprus) Georgios Okkas
- (Cyprus) Zanos Savva
- (France) Désiré Doué
- (France) Sékou Mara
- (France) Chrislain Matsima
- (France) Tanguy Nianzou
- (Slovenia) Tjaš Begić
- (Slovenia) David Flakus Bosilj
- (Slovenia) Nejc Gradišar
- (Slovenia) Jošt Pišek
- (Slovenia) Svit Sešlar
- (Slovenia) Adrian Zeljković

1 own goal

- (Cyprus) Evagoras Antoniou (against France)
- (Cyprus) Stefanos Kittos (against Austria)
- (Cyprus) Nikolas Koutsakos (against Slovenia)
