= 2025 UEFA European Under-21 Championship qualification Group B =

Football tournament group stage

Group B of the 2025 UEFA European Under-21 Championship qualifying competition consists of six teams: Spain, Belgium, Scotland, Hungary, Kazakhstan, and Malta. The composition of the nine groups in the qualifying group stage was decided by the draw held on 2 February 2023 at the UEFA headquarters in Nyon, Switzerland, with the teams seeded according to their coefficient ranking.

== Standings ==
Pos	Team	Pld	W	D	L	GF	GA	GD	Pts	Qualification	Spain	Belgium	Scotland	Hungary	Kazakhstan	Malta
1	Spain	10	9	1	0	28	5	+23	28	Final tournament	—	1–0	1–0	2–0	4–3	6–0
2	Belgium	10	6	1	3	13	6	+7	19	Play-offs	1–1	—	0–2	0–1	1–0	3–1
3	Scotland	10	5	1	4	19	11	+8	16 (Note: Head-to-head points: Scotland 4, Hungary 1.)		1–2	0–2	—	3–1	4–1	2–1
4	Hungary	10	5	1	4	12	8	+4	16		0–1	0–1	0–0	—	2–0	2–1
5	Kazakhstan	10	3	0	7	13	24	−11	9		0–4	0–3	3–2	0–3	—	4–1
6	Malta	10	0	0	10	4	35	−31	0		0–6	0–2	0–5	0–3	0–2	—

Source: UEFA
Rules for classification: Tiebreakers

== Matches ==
Times are CET/CEST, (Note: CEST (UTC+2) for dates between 26 March and 29 October 2023 and between 31 March and 27 October 2024, and CET (UTC+1) for all other dates.) as listed by UEFA (local times, if different, are in parentheses).

7 September 2023
17:45

Hungary	2–0	Kazakhstan
M. Kovács 10'; Eördögh 89'	Report

Szent Gellért Fórum, Szeged
Attendance: 1,326
Referee: Amine Kourgheli (Belarus)

8 September 2023
20:45

Malta	0–6	Spain
	Report	D. López 5'; Veiga 14', 18'; Akhomach 49'; Torre 70'; Turrientes 72'

Hibernians Stadium, Paola
Attendance: 492
Referee: Lionel Tschudi (Switzerland)

11 September 2023
20:00

Belgium	1–0	Kazakhstan
Olaigbe 77'	Report

Den Dreef, Leuven
Attendance: 740
Referee: Kaspar Sjöberg (Sweden)
11 September 2023
21:00

Spain	1–0	Scotland
Turrientes 83'	Report

Nuevo La Victoria, Jaén
Attendance: 9,453
Referee: Thorvaldur Árnason (Iceland)

12 September 2023
17:45

Malta	0–3	Hungary
	Report	Kocsis 3', 41'; M. Kovács 85'

Hibernians Stadium, Paola
Attendance: 124
Referee: Marek Radina (Czech Republic)

13 October 2023
18:00

Malta	0–2	Belgium
	Report	Olaigbe 75'; Engels 90'

Hibernians Stadium, Paola
Attendance: 167
Referee: Dzmitry Dzmitryieu (Belarus)
13 October 2023
20:00 (19:00 BST)

Scotland	3–1	Hungary
Bowie 2', 7'; Doak 32' (pen.)	Report	B. Kovács 43'

Fir Park, Motherwell
Attendance: 1,810
Referee: Joey Kooij (Netherlands)

17 October 2023
15:30 (19:30 ALMT)

Kazakhstan	0–4	Spain
	Report	F. López 11'; D. López 54'; Pérez 56'; Omorodion 90'

Astana Arena, Astana
Attendance: 5,778
Referee: Walter Altmann (Austria)
17 October 2023
17:45

Hungary	0–1	Belgium
	Report	Olaigbe 72'

Szusza Ferenc Stadion, Budapest
Attendance: 1,311
Referee: Krzysztof Jakubik (Poland)
17 October 2023
18:30 (17:30 BST)

Scotland	2–1	Malta
Lowry 32' (pen.); Bowie 82'	Report	Zammit 52' (pen.)

Fir Park, Motherwell
Attendance: 1,347
Referee: Marcel Birsan (Romania)

16 November 2023
18:00

Malta	0–2	Kazakhstan
	Report	Abdulla 52'; Kasabulat 71'

Hibernians Stadium, Paola
Attendance: 142
Referee: Antoine Paul Chiaramonti (Andorra)
17 November 2023
20:00

Belgium	0–2	Scotland
	Report	Mullen 13'; Cameron 31'

Stadion Schiervelde, Roeselare
Attendance: 489
Referee: Marek Radina (Czech Republic)
17 November 2023
21:00

Spain	2–0	Hungary
Martín 36'; Torre 67'	Report

Estadio Nuevo Colombino, Huelva
Attendance: 12,857
Referee: Jarred Gillett (Australia)

21 November 2023
20:00

Belgium	1–1	Spain
Engels 64' (pen.)	Report	Omorodion 66'

Den Dreef, Leuven
Attendance: 1,558
Referee: Dario Bel (Croatia)
21 November 2023
20:00

Hungary	0–0	Scotland
	Report

Hidegkuti Nándor Stadion, Budapest
Attendance: 1,013
Referee: Viktor Shimusik (Belarus)

21 March 2024
20:00

Belgium	3–1	Malta
Vermant 40'; Steuckers 47'; Olaigbe 90+1'	Report	Zammit 62' (pen.)

Den Dreef, Leuven
Attendance: 786
Referee: Genc Nuza (Kosovo)
21 March 2024
20:00 (19:00 GMT)

Scotland	4–1	Kazakhstan
Doig 19'; Cameron 24'; Conway 38' (pen.); Fiorini 55'	Report	Trufanov 68' (pen.)

St Mirren Park, Paisley
Attendance: 1,022
Referee: Sven Jablonski (Germany)

26 March 2024
14:00 (19:00 ALMT)

Kazakhstan	0–3	Hungary
	Report	Kosznovszky 34'; Kerezsi 48'; Bényei 90+3'

Almaty Central Stadium, Almaty
Attendance: 9,270
Referee: Vitālijs Spasjoņņikovs (Latvia)
26 March 2024
19:00

Spain	1–0	Belgium
Joseph 88'	Report

Power Horse Stadium, Almería
Attendance: 5,927
Referee: Nenad Minaković (Serbia)

5 September 2024
15:00 (19:00 ALMT)

Kazakhstan	4–1	Malta
Sviridov 28', 80'; Abdulla 50'; Zhumakhanov 90+1' (pen.)	Report	Zammit 71' (pen.)

FC Kairat Academy, Almaty
Attendance: 225
Referee: Andreas Argyrou (Cyprus)
6 September 2024
20:00 (19:00 BST)

Scotland	1–2	Spain
Mebude 62'	Report	Huijsen 59'; Joseph 69'

Tynecastle Park, Edinburgh
Attendance: 2,558
Referee: Jakob Sundberg (Denmark)

10 September 2024
16:00 (20:00 ALMT)

Kazakhstan	0–3	Belgium
	Report	Sylla 9'; Sardella 36'; Mokio 90+4'

Almaty Central Stadium, Almaty
Attendance: 911
Referee: Florian Lata (Albania)
10 September 2024
17:45

Hungary	0–1	Spain
	Report	Navarro 20'

Széktói Stadion, Kecskemét
Attendance: 2,113
Referee: Robert Jenkins (Wales)
10 September 2024
18:30

Malta	0–5	Scotland
	Report	Ellul 3' (o.g.); Murray 9'; Mulligan 17'; Miller 56'; Neilson 82'

National Stadium, Ta' Qali
Attendance: 238
Referee: Edgars Maļcevs (Latvia)

10 October 2024
20:00

Hungary	2–1	Malta
Németh 13'; Gruber 25'	Report	Zammit 48' (pen.)

Hidegkuti Nándor Stadion, Budapest
Attendance: 953
Referee: Mervan Bejtullahu (Kosovo)
10 October 2024
20:30

Spain	4–3	Kazakhstan
Joseph 15', 23', 44'; Turrientes 20'	Report	Kenzhebek 12', 67'; Ankudinov 76'

Municipal, La Línea de la Concepción
Attendance: 2,347
Referee: Maria Sole Ferrieri Caputi (Italy)
11 October 2024
20:00

Scotland	0–2	Belgium
	Report	Stassin 72', 90+2'

Tynecastle Park, Edinburgh
Attendance: 2,103
Referee: Miguel Nogueira (Portugal)

15 October 2024
17:00

Spain	6–0	Malta
Omorodion 5', 37', 39', 45+1'; Peque 54'; Fernández 76'	Report

Nuevo Mirador, Algeciras
Attendance: 2,125
Referee: Georgi Ginchev (Bulgaria)
15 October 2024
18:00

Belgium	0–1	Hungary
	Report	Németh 9' (pen.)

Den Dreef, Leuven
Attendance: 962
Referee: Chrysovalantis Theouli (Cyprus)
15 October 2024
18:00

Kazakhstan	3–2	Scotland
Abdulla 30'; Zhumakhanov 66' (pen.); Trufanov 74'	Report	Miller 61'; Mullen 85'

Almaty Central Stadium, Almaty
Attendance: 578
Referee: Alan Kijas (Austria)

== Goalscorers ==
There have been 89 goals scored in 30 matches, for an average of 2.97 goals per match.

6 goals

- (Spain) Samu Omorodion

5 goals

- (Spain) Mateo Joseph

4 goals

- (Belgium) Kazeem Olaigbe
- (Malta) Andrea Zammit

3 goals

- (Kazakhstan) Aybar Abdulla
- (Scotland) Kieron Bowie
- (Spain) Beñat Turrientes

2 goals

- (Belgium) Arne Engels
- (Belgium) Lucas Stassin
- (Hungary) Dominik Kocsis
- (Hungary) Mátyás Kovács
- (Hungary) András Németh
- (Kazakhstan) Galymzhan Kenzhebek
- (Kazakhstan) Ivan Sviridov
- (Kazakhstan) Yan Trufanov
- (Kazakhstan) Adilbek Zhumakhanov
- (Scotland) Lyall Cameron
- (Scotland) Lennon Miller
- (Scotland) Jeremiah Mullen
- (Spain) Diego López
- (Spain) Pablo Torre
- (Spain) Gabriel Veiga

1 goal

- (Belgium) Jorthy Mokio
- (Belgium) Killian Sardella
- (Belgium) Jarne Steuckers
- (Belgium) Youssuf Sylla
- (Belgium) Romeo Vermant
- (Hungary) Ágoston Bényei
- (Hungary) András Eördögh
- (Hungary) Zsombor Gruber
- (Hungary) Zalán Kerezsi
- (Hungary) Márk Kosznovszky
- (Hungary) Barnabás Kovács
- (Kazakhstan) Danil Ankudinov
- (Kazakhstan) Damir Kasabulat
- (Scotland) Tommy Conway
- (Scotland) Ben Doak
- (Scotland) Josh Doig
- (Scotland) Lewis Fiorini
- (Scotland) Alex Lowry
- (Scotland) Adedire Mebude
- (Scotland) Josh Mulligan
- (Scotland) Dane Murray
- (Scotland) Lewis Neilson
- (Spain) Ilias Akhomach
- (Spain) Roberto Fernández
- (Spain) Dean Huijsen
- (Spain) Fermín López
- (Spain) Carlos Martín
- (Spain) Roberto Navarro
- (Spain) Peque
- (Spain) Fran Pérez

1 own goal

- (Malta) Matthew Ellul (against Scotland)
