= 2025 UEFA European Under-21 Championship qualification =

Tournament details
- Dates: 24 March 2023 – 19 November 2024
- Teams: 52 (from 1 confederation)

Tournament statistics
- Matches played: 254
- Goals scored: 770 (3.03 per match)
- Attendance: 565,209 (2,225 per match)
- Top scorer(s): (Portugal) Fábio Silva (8 goals)
- All statistics correct as of 16 October 2024.

The 2025 UEFA European Under-21 Championship qualification was a men's under-21 national football team competition that determined the 15 teams that joined the automatically qualified hosts Slovakia in the 2025 UEFA European Under-21 Championship final tournament.

Apart from Slovakia, Liechtenstein (dissolved their U21 team until 2025) and Russia (banned), remaining 52 UEFA member national teams entered this qualifying competition. Players born on or after 1 January 2002 were eligible to participate.

== Format ==
The qualifying competition will consist of the following two rounds:

- Qualifying group stage: The 52 teams are drawn into nine groups: seven groups of six teams and two groups of five teams. Each group is played in home-and-away round-robin format. The nine group winners and the three best runner-up (not counting results against the sixth-placed team) qualify directly for the final tournament, while the remaining six runners-up advance to the play-offs.
- Play-offs: The six teams are drawn into three ties to play home-and-away two-legged matches to determine the last three qualified teams.

=== Tiebreakers ===
In the qualifying group stage, teams are ranked according to points (3 points for a win, 1 point for a draw, 0 points for a loss), and if tied on points, the following tiebreaking criteria are applied, in the order given, to determine the rankings (Regulations Article 14.01):

1. Points in head-to-head matches among tied teams;
2. Goal difference in head-to-head matches among tied teams;
3. Goals scored in head-to-head matches among tied teams;
4. If more than two teams are tied, and after applying all head-to-head criteria above, a subset of teams are still tied, all head-to-head criteria above are reapplied exclusively to this subset of teams;
5. Goal difference in all group matches;
6. Goals scored in all group matches;
7. Away goals scored in all group matches;
8. Wins in all group matches;
9. Away wins in all group matches;
10. Disciplinary points (red card = 3 points, yellow card = 1 point, expulsion for two yellow cards in one match = 3 points);
11. UEFA coefficient ranking for the qualifying group stage draw.

To determine the bests runner-up from the qualifying group stage, the results against the teams in sixth place are discarded. The following criteria are applied (Regulations Article 15.02):

1. Points;
2. Goal difference;
3. Goals scored;
4. Away goals scored;
5. Wins;
6. Away wins;
7. Disciplinary points;
8. UEFA coefficient ranking for the qualifying group stage draw.

== Schedule ==
Stage	Draw date	FIFA International Dates
Qualifying group stage	2 February 2023	FIFA date 1 (24–28 March 2023)
Qualifying group stage	2 February 2023	FIFA date 2 (15–20 June 2023)
Qualifying group stage	2 February 2023	FIFA date 3 (6–12 September 2023)
Qualifying group stage	2 February 2023	FIFA date 4 (12–17 October 2023)
Qualifying group stage	2 February 2023	FIFA date 5 (16–21 November 2023)
Qualifying group stage	2 February 2023	FIFA date 6 (21–26 March 2024)
Qualifying group stage	2 February 2023	FIFA date 7 (5–10 September 2024)
Qualifying group stage	2 February 2023	FIFA date 8 (10–15 October 2024)
Play-offs	17 October 2024	1st leg (11 November 2024)
Play-offs	17 October 2024	2nd leg (19 November 2024)

== Qualifying group stage ==
=== Draw ===
Final tournament host
Team
Slovakia

Pot 1 Team Spain Portugal Germany France Netherlands England Denmark Italy Romania	Pot 2 Team Croatia Switzerland Belgium Czech Republic Poland Ukraine Sweden Austria Republic of Ireland	Pot 3 Team Norway Greece Iceland Slovenia Israel Finland Georgia Serbia Scotland
Pot 4 Team Bosnia and Herzegovina Bulgaria Hungary Turkey North Macedonia Wales Belarus Northern Ireland Albania	Pot 5 Team Kosovo Montenegro Moldova Lithuania Faroe Islands Cyprus Kazakhstan Azerbaijan Latvia	Pot 6 Team Malta Armenia Luxembourg Andorra Estonia Gibraltar San Marino

Banned from entering qualifying
Team
Russia

Did not enter
Team
Liechtenstein

Each group contained one team from each of Pots 1–6 (Pots 1–5 for five-team group). Based on the decisions taken by the UEFA Emergency Panel, the following teams would not be drawn in the same group.

- Armenia and Azerbaijan
- Belarus and Ukraine
- Gibraltar and Spain
- Bosnia and Herzegovina and Kosovo
- Kosovo and Serbia

=== Groups ===
==== Group A ====
Pos	Team	Pld	W	D	L	GF	GA	GD	Pts	Qualification	Italy	Norway	Ireland	Turkey	Latvia	San Marino
1	Italy	10	6	4	0	27	4	+23	22	Final tournament	—	2–0	1–1	1–1	2–0	7–0
2	Norway	10	6	1	3	28	11	+17	19 (Note: Head-to-head points: Norway 4, Republic of Ireland 1.)	Play-offs	0–3	—	3–2	5–1	7–0	4–0
3	Republic of Ireland	10	5	4	1	24	12	+12	19		2–2	1–1	—	3–2	2–2	3–0
4	Turkey	10	4	1	5	21	15	+6	13		0–2	2–0	0–1	—	3–0	5–0
5	Latvia	10	3	2	5	10	18	−8	11		0–0	0–1	1–2	2–1	—	2–0
6	San Marino	10	0	0	10	1	51	−50	0		0–7	0–7	0–7	1–6	0–3	—

Source: UEFA

==== Group B ====
Pos	Team	Pld	W	D	L	GF	GA	GD	Pts	Qualification	Spain	Belgium	Scotland	Hungary	Kazakhstan	Malta
1	Spain	10	9	1	0	28	5	+23	28	Final tournament	—	1–0	1–0	2–0	4–3	6–0
2	Belgium	10	6	1	3	13	6	+7	19	Play-offs	1–1	—	0–2	0–1	1–0	3–1
3	Scotland	10	5	1	4	19	11	+8	16 (Note: Head-to-head points: Scotland 4, Hungary 1.)		1–2	0–2	—	3–1	4–1	2–1
4	Hungary	10	5	1	4	12	8	+4	16		0–1	0–1	0–0	—	2–0	2–1
5	Kazakhstan	10	3	0	7	13	24	−11	9		0–4	0–3	3–2	0–3	—	4–1
6	Malta	10	0	0	10	4	35	−31	0		0–6	0–2	0–5	0–3	0–2	—

Source: UEFA

==== Group C ====
Pos	Team	Pld	W	D	L	GF	GA	GD	Pts	Qualification	Netherlands	Georgia	Sweden	North Macedonia	Moldova	Gibraltar
1	Netherlands	10	10	0	0	32	3	+29	30	Final tournament	—	3–1	3–0	5–0	3–0	1–0
2	Georgia	10	6	1	3	14	10	+4	19	Play-offs	0–3	—	0–0	2–1	3–0	2–0
3	Sweden	10	5	2	3	25	10	+15	17		2–4	3–2	—	0–1	4–0	9–0
4	North Macedonia	10	4	0	6	8	15	−7	12		0–2	0–1	0–2	—	2–1	1–0
5	Moldova	10	2	1	7	7	20	−13	7		0–3	0–1	0–0	2–1	—	1–2
6	Gibraltar	10	1	0	9	3	31	−28	3		0–5	0–2	0–5	0–2	1–3	—

Source: UEFA

==== Group D ====
Pos	Team	Pld	W	D	L	GF	GA	GD	Pts	Qualification	Germany	Poland	Bulgaria	Kosovo	Estonia	Israel
1	Germany	10	8	2	0	35	10	+25	26	Final tournament	—	3–1	2–1	0–0	4–1	2–0
2	Poland	10	7	1	2	24	10	+14	22	Final tournament	3–3	—	0–1	3–0	5–0	2–1
3	Bulgaria	10	4	3	3	17	12	+5	15		2–3	1–3	—	1–1	6–0	1–0
4	Kosovo	10	3	3	4	10	17	−7	12		0–3	0–4	2–2	—	2–0	3–1
5	Estonia	10	2	1	7	7	31	−24	7		1–10	0–1	1–1	3–1	—	1–0
6	Israel	10	1	0	9	5	18	−13	3		1–5	1–2	0–1	0–1	1–0	—

Source: UEFA

==== Group E ====
Pos	Team	Pld	W	D	L	GF	GA	GD	Pts	Qualification	Romania	Finland	Switzerland	Albania	Montenegro	Armenia
1	Romania	10	7	1	2	23	10	+13	22	Final tournament	—	1–0	3–1	5–0	1–0	2–0
2	Finland	10	6	2	2	21	8	+13	20	Play-offs	2–0	—	1–2	4–1	2–1	6–0
3	Switzerland	10	5	3	2	21	12	+9	18		2–2	1–1	—	1–2	4–2	5–0
4	Albania	10	5	1	4	12	17	−5	16		3–2	0–0	1–3	—	2–0	1–0
5	Montenegro	10	2	1	7	8	19	−11	7		2–6	1–2	0–2	1–0	—	0–0
6	Armenia	10	0	2	8	2	21	−19	2		0–1	1–3	0–0	1–2	0–1	—

Source: UEFA

==== Group F ====
Pos	Team	Pld	W	D	L	GF	GA	GD	Pts	Qualification	England	Ukraine	Serbia		Luxembourg	Azerbaijan
1	England	10	8	1	1	41	6	+35	25	Final tournament	—	2–1	9–1	3–0	7–0	7–0
2	Ukraine	10	8	0	2	20	7	+13	24	Final tournament	3–2	—	2–1	1–0	4–0	1–0
3	Serbia	10	5	1	4	13	18	−5	16		0–3	1–0	—	1–2	2–0	2–0
4	Northern Ireland	10	3	2	5	10	10	0	11		0–0	1–2	1–2	—	0–1	5–0
5	Luxembourg	10	2	2	6	6	23	−17	8		0–3	0–3	1–1	0–0	—	2–0
6	Azerbaijan	10	1	0	9	4	30	−26	3		1–5	0–3	0–2	0–1	3–2	—

Source: UEFA

==== Group G ====
Pos	Team	Pld	W	D	L	GF	GA	GD	Pts	Qualification	Portugal	Croatia	Greece	Faroe Islands	Belarus	Andorra
1	Portugal	10	9	0	1	33	6	+27	27	Final tournament	—	5–1	2–0	4–0	6–1	3–0
2	Croatia	10	7	1	2	20	14	+6	22	Play-offs	0–2	—	3–2	2–1	2–0	2–0
3	Greece	10	5	2	3	16	10	+6	17		2–1	2–2	—	3–0	1–1	1–0
4	Faroe Islands	10	3	1	6	11	24	−13	10		1–3	2–4	0–4	—	1–0	2–2
5	Belarus	10	1	3	6	6	20	−14	6		0–5	0–1	1–0	2–3	—	0–0
6	Andorra	10	0	3	7	4	16	−12	3		1–2	0–3	0–1	0–1	1–1	—

Source: UEFA

==== Group H ====
Pos	Team	Pld	W	D	L	GF	GA	GD	Pts	Qualification	Slovenia	France	Austria	Cyprus	Bosnia and Herzegovina
1	Slovenia	8	5	2	1	13	7	+6	17	Final tournament	—	0–4	1–0	2–0	3–0
2	France	8	5	1	2	22	6	+16	16	Final tournament	1–1	—	1–2	9–0	2–0
3	Austria	8	4	3	1	12	6	+6	15		1–1	2–0	—	2–2	2–0
4	Cyprus	8	1	2	5	7	23	−16	5		0–3	0–3	1–1	—	1–2
5	Bosnia and Herzegovina	8	1	0	7	5	17	−12	3		1–2	1–2	0–2	1–3	—

Source: UEFA

==== Group I ====
Pos	Team	Pld	W	D	L	GF	GA	GD	Pts	Qualification	Denmark	Czech Republic	Wales	Iceland	Lithuania
1	Denmark	8	5	2	1	18	8	+10	17	Final tournament	—	5–0	2–2	2–0	3–0
2	Czech Republic	8	4	2	2	13	11	+2	14 (Note: Head-to-head points: Czech Republic 4, Wales 1)	Play-offs	0–0	—	1–1	4–1	3–0
3	Wales	8	4	2	2	13	11	+2	14		1–2	1–2	—	1–0	2–1
4	Iceland	8	3	0	5	9	14	−5	9		4–2	2–1	1–2	—	0–2
5	Lithuania	8	1	0	7	7	16	−9	3		1–2	1–2	2–3	0–1	—

Source: UEFA

=== Ranking of second-placed teams ===
Because two groups have one fewer team than the others, only the results of the second-placed teams against the first, third, fourth, and fifth-placed teams in their group are taken into account, while results against the sixth-placed team in six-team groups are not included. As a result, eight matches played by each second-placed team are counted for the purposes of determining the ranking. The top three teams qualify directly for the final tournament, while the other six teams enter the play-offs.

Pos	Grp	Team	Pld	W	D	L	GF	GA	GD	Pts	Qualification
1	F	Ukraine	8	6	0	2	16	7	+9	18	Final tournament
2	H	France	8	5	1	2	22	6	+16	16	Final tournament
3	D	Poland	8	5	1	2	20	8	+12	16	Final tournament
4	G	Croatia	8	5	1	2	15	14	+1	16	Play-offs
5	E	Finland	8	4	2	2	12	7	+5	14	Play-offs
6	I	Czech Republic	8	4	2	2	13	11	+2	14	Play-offs
7	A	Norway	8	4	1	3	17	11	+6	13	Play-offs
8	B	Belgium	8	4	1	3	8	5	+3	13	Play-offs
9	C	Georgia	8	4	1	3	10	10	0	13	Play-offs

Rules for classification: 1) points; 2) goal difference; 3) goals scored; 4) away goals scored; 5) wins; 6) away wins; 7) disciplinary points; 8) coefficient ranking.

== Play-offs ==
The draw for the play-offs was held on 17 October 2024 in Nyon, Switzerland.

Team 1	Agg.	Team 2	1st leg	2nd leg
Finland	6–3	Norway	5–1	1–2
Belgium	1–3	Czech Republic	0–2	1–1
Georgia	3–3 (7–6 p)	Croatia	1–0	2–3 (a.e.t.)

== Qualified teams ==
The following teams qualified for the final tournament.

Note: All appearance statistics include only U-21 era (since 1978).

Team	Qualification method	Date of qualification	Appearance(s)				Previous best performance (Note: Bold text indicates they hosted that edition.)	Rank
Team	Qualification method	Date of qualification	Total	First	Last	Streak	Previous best performance	Rank
Slovakia	Hosts	25 January 2023	3rd (Note: If Czechoslovakia's appearances are included, it is Slovakia's 9th time participating.)	2000	2017	1	Fourth place (2000)	23
Netherlands	Group C winners	9 September 2024	10th	1988	2023	3	Champions (2006, 2007)	4
Spain	Group B winners	10 September 2024	17th	1982	2023	5	Champions (1986, 1998, 2011, 2013, 2019)	1
Portugal	Group G winners	11 October 2024	11th	1994	2023	3	Runners-up (1994, 2015, 2021)	3
Germany	Group D winners	11 October 2024	15th	1982	2023	8	Champions (2009, 2017, 2021)	5
Denmark	Group I winners	11 October 2024	10th	1978	2021	1	Semi-finals (1992, 2015)	9
Ukraine	Three best runners-up	11 October 2024	4th (Note: If Soviet Union's appearances are included, it is Ukraine's 7th time participating.)	2006	2023	2	Runners-up (2006)	7
England	Group F winners	12 October 2024	18th	1978	2023	10	Champions (1982, 1984, 2023)	2
Romania	Group E winners	15 October 2024	5th	1998	2023	4	Semi-finals (2019)	10
Poland	Three best runners-up	15 October 2024	8th	1982	2019	1	Quarter-finals (1982, 1984, 1986, 1992, 1994)	14
Slovenia	Group H winners	15 October 2024	2nd (Note: If Yugoslavia's appearances are included, it is Slovenia's 7th time participating.)	2021		1	Group stage (2021)	19
France	Three best runners-up	15 October 2024	12th	1982	2023	4	Champions (1988)	6
Italy	Group A winners	15 October 2024	23rd	1978	2023	7	Champions (1992, 1994, 1996, 2000, 2004)	7
Finland	Play-offs winner	19 November 2024	2nd	2009		1	Group stage (2009)	20
Czech Republic	Play-offs winner	19 November 2024	10th (Note: If Czechoslovakia's appearances are included, it is Czech Republic's 16th time participating.)	1996	2023	3	Champions (2002)	13
Georgia	Play-offs winner	19 November 2024	2nd (Note: If Soviet Union's appearances are included, it is Georgia's 5th time participating.)	2023		2	Quarter-finals (2023)	17

== Top goalscorers ==
There have been 776 goals scored in 250 matches, for an average of 3.1 goals per match.

8 goals

- (Portugal) Fábio Silva

7 goals

- (England) Harvey Elliott
- (Finland) Otso Liimatta
- (Netherlands) Noah Ohio
- (Norway) Andreas Schjelderup

6 goals

- (Croatia) Marin Ljubičić
- (Italy) Francesco Pio Esposito
- (England) Noni Madueke
- (Spain) Samu Omorodion
- (Germany) Youssoufa Moukoko
- (Norway) Kristian Arnstad
- (Slovenia) Tio Cipot
- (Turkey) Erencan Yardımcı

5 goals

- (England) James McAtee
- (Spain) Mateo Joseph
- (Germany) Karim Adeyemi
- (Republic of Ireland) Rocco Vata
- (Netherlands) Million Manhoef
- (Poland) Filip Szymczak
- (Romania) Louis Munteanu

4 goals

- (Albania) Adrion Pajaziti
- (Belgium) Kazeem Olaigbe
- (Bulgaria) Nikola Iliev
- (Bulgaria) Georgi Nikolov
- (Czech Republic) Václav Sejk
- (Finland) Casper Terho
- (France) Arnaud Kalimuendo
- (Faroe Islands) Jørgen Nielsen
- (Germany) Nicolò Tresoldi
- (Germany) Nick Woltemade
- (Greece) Christos Tzolis
- (Republic of Ireland) Sinclair Armstrong
- (Iceland) Kristall Máni Ingason
- (Italy) Tommaso Baldanzi
- (Italy) Wilfried Gnonto
- (Moldova) Vlad Răileanu
- (Malta) Andrea Zammit
- (Portugal) Paulo Bernardo
- (Switzerland) Fabian Rieder
- (Sweden) Jusef Erabi
- (Ukraine) Nazar Voloshyn

For full lists of goalscorers, see sections in each group:

- Group A
- Group B
- Group C
- Group D
- Group E
- Group F
- Group G
- Group H
- Group I
