= Kazakhstan national under-21 football team =

National association football team

Kazakhstan Under-21
- Nickname: Жас Қаршығалар (The Young Hawks)
- Association: Football Federation of Kazakhstan
- Head coach: (Kazakhstan) Kairat Nurdauletov
- Captain: Adilbek Zhumakhanov
- Home stadium: Almaty Central Stadium
First colours	Second colours	Third colours

First international
- Iran 4–0 Kazakhstan (Al-Ahsa, Saudi Arabia, 15 May 1996)

Biggest win
- Kazakhstan 4–1 Georgia (16 October 2007); Luxembourg 0–3 Kazakhstan (28 March 2017)

Biggest defeat
- Greece 5–0 Kazakhstan (16 November 2004); Spain 5–0 Kazakhstan (25 March 2008)

UEFA U-21 Championship
- Appearances: None

The Kazakhstan national under-21 football team is the national under-21 football team of Kazakhstan and is administered by the Football Federation of Kazakhstan. The team competes in the UEFA European Under-21 Championship every two years.

== UEFA U-21 Championship Qualification Record ==
Year	Pos	Pld	W	D	L	GF	GA	GD	Pts	Best goalscorer
2006	7 out of 7	12	2	1	9	8	23	−15	7	Aleksey Shakin, Vadim Borovskiy - 2
2007	lost in Preliminary round									no one scored
2009	4 out of 5	8	2	0	6	9	18	−9	6	Yerzat Kenbayev - 4
2011	4 out of 5	8	1	2	5	7	17	−10	5	7 players scored 1 goal
2013	4 out of 5	8	0	4	4	2	14	−12	4	Abzal Beisebekov, Yermek Kuantayev - 1
2015	3 out of 5	8	3	0	5	8	18	−10	9	Roman Murtazayev - 3
2017	4 out of 5	8	1	1	6	3	14	−11	4	Abat Aimbetov, Miras Tuliyev, Didar Zhalmukan - 1
2019	4 out of 6	10	2	4	4	13	18	−5	10	Maxim Fedin - 3
2021	4 out of 6	10	3	1	6	12	21	-9	10	Oralkhan Omirtayev - 4
2023	5 out of 5	8	0	2	6	4	14	-10	2	Abylaikhan Zhumabek - 2
2025	TBD	0	0	0	0	0	0	0	0	TBD

== UEFA U-21 Euro 2025 qualification ==
Pos	Team	Pld	W	D	L	GF	GA	GD	Pts	Qualification	Spain	Belgium	Scotland	Hungary	Kazakhstan	Malta
1	Spain	10	9	1	0	28	5	+23	28	Final tournament	—	1–0	1–0	2–0	4–3	6–0
2	Belgium	10	6	1	3	13	6	+7	19	Play-offs	1–1	—	0–2	0–1	1–0	3–1
3	Scotland	10	5	1	4	19	11	+8	16 (Note: Head-to-head points: Scotland 4, Hungary 1.)		1–2	0–2	—	3–1	4–1	2–1
4	Hungary	10	5	1	4	12	8	+4	16		0–1	0–1	0–0	—	2–0	2–1
5	Kazakhstan	10	3	0	7	13	24	−11	9		0–4	0–3	3–2	0–3	—	4–1
6	Malta	10	0	0	10	4	35	−31	0		0–6	0–2	0–5	0–3	0–2	—

Source: UEFA
Rules for classification: Tiebreakers

== Current squad ==
- The following players were called up for the friendly matches.
- Match dates: 7 and 11 September 2022
- Opposition: Hungary and Belgium
- Caps and goals correct as of: 27 September 2022, after the match against Belarus
- Names in italics denote players who have been capped for the senior team

No.	Pos.	Player	Date of birth (age)	Caps	Goals	Club
	GK	Temirlan Anarbekov	14 October 2003 (age 23)	2	0	(Kazakhstan Football Federation) Kairat
	GK	Nikita Pivkin	27 March 2003 (age 23)	1	0	(Kazakhstan Football Federation) Yelimay
	GK	Danila Karpikov	15 October 2003 (age 23)	1	0	(Kazakhstan Football Federation) Shakhter Karagandy
	DF	Adilbek Zhumakhanov	27 December 2002 (age 23)	12	0	(Kazakhstan Football Federation) Atyrau
	DF	Egor Tkachenko	15 April 2003 (age 23)	3	0	(Kazakhstan Football Federation) Kairat
	DF	Adilkhan Dobay	30 July 2002 (age 24)	2	0	(Kazakhstan Football Federation) Maktaaral
	DF	Lev Kurgin	6 June 2002 (age 24)	2	0	(Kazakhstan Football Federation) Kairat
	DF	Aleksandr Shirobokov	2 January 2003 (age 23)	2	0	(Kazakhstan Football Federation) Kairat
	DF	Sultan Askarov	21 January 2004 (age 22)	0	0	(Kazakhstan Football Federation) Kairat-Zhastar
	DF	Aleksandr Mrynskiy	15 July 2004 (age 22)	0	0	(Kazakhstan Football Federation) Kairat
	MF	Abylaykhan Nazymkhanov	5 February 2002 (age 24)	4	0	(Kazakhstan Football Federation) Shakhter Karagandy
	MF	Meirambek Kalmyrza	15 December 2002 (age 23)	3	0	(Kazakhstan Football Federation) Okzhetpes
	MF	Nurgaini Buribayev	20 August 2002 (age 24)	2	1	(Kazakhstan Football Federation) Turan
	MF	Yersultan Kaldybekov	12 January 2002 (age 24)	2	0	(Kazakhstan Football Federation) Atyrau
	MF	Adilet Sadybekov	26 May 2002 (age 24)	0	0	(Kazakhstan Football Federation) Kairat
	MF	Alen Aiman	2 June 2002 (age 24)	0	0	(Kazakhstan Football Federation) Yelimay
	MF	Aybar Abdulla	22 January 2002 (age 24)	0	0	(Kazakhstan Football Federation) Shakhter Karagandy
	MF	David Esimbekov	11 September 2004 (age 22)	2	0	(Russian Football Union) Chernomorets Novorossiysk
	MF	Nurali Zhaksylyk	4 November 2004 (age 22)	0	0	(Kazakhstan Football Federation) Astana
	MF	Beibit Galym	25 October 2004 (age 22)	0	0	(Kazakhstan Football Federation) Tobol
	FW	Ivan Sviridov	28 June 2002 (age 24)	5	0	(Kazakhstan Football Federation) Shakhter Karagandy
	FW	Yan Trufanov	17 May 2004 (age 22)	0	0	(Kazakhstan Football Federation) Kairat
	FW	Denis Mitrofanov	9 January 2002 (age 24)	0	0	(Football Federation of Belarus) Isloch
	FW	Danil Ankudinov	31 July 2003 (age 23)	0	0	(Football Federation of Belarus) Dnepr

=== Recent call-ups ===
The following players have also been called up to the Kazakhstan's squad in the last 12 months and are still eligible to represent.

Pos.	Player	Date of birth (age)	Caps	Goals	Club	Latest call-up

Notes

- Players in italics are still active at international level.
- ^{PRE} Preliminary squad.
- ^{INJ} Injured after call up to squad.
- ^{WD} Player was withdrawn from the roster for non-injury related reasons.
- ^{SUS} Player was suspended for the next match.

== UEFA Under-21 Qualification ==
- 1978 to 1992 - see Soviet Union

#	Year	M	W	D	L	GF	GA	GD
1	1978 UEFA European Under-21 Championship	DNE						
2	1980 UEFA European Under-21 Championship	DNE						
3	1982 UEFA European Under-21 Championship	DNE						
4	1984 UEFA European Under-21 Championship	DNE						
5	1986 UEFA European Under-21 Championship	DNE						
6	1988 UEFA European Under-21 Championship	DNE						
7	1990 UEFA European Under-21 Championship	DNE						
8	1992 UEFA European Under-21 Championship	DNE						
9	1994 UEFA European Under-21 Championship qualification	DNE						
10	1996 UEFA European Under-21 Championship qualification	DNE						
11	1998 UEFA European Under-21 Championship qualification	DNE						
12	2000 UEFA European Under-21 Championship qualification	DNE						
13	2002 UEFA European Under-21 Championship qualification	DNE						
14	2004 UEFA European Under-21 Championship qualification	DNE						
15	2006 UEFA European Under-21 Championship qualification	12	2	1	9	8	23	-15
16	2007 UEFA European Under-21 Championship qualification	2	0	1	1	0	1	-1
17	2009 UEFA European Under-21 Championship qualification	8	2	0	6	9	18	-9
18	2011 UEFA European Under-21 Championship qualification	8	1	2	5	7	17	-10
19	2013 UEFA European Under-21 Championship qualification	8	0	4	4	2	14	-12
20	2015 UEFA European Under-21 Championship qualification	8	3	0	5	8	18	-10
21	2017 UEFA European Under-21 Championship qualification	8	1	1	6	3	14	-11
22	2019 UEFA European Under-21 Championship qualification	10	2	4	4	13	18	-5
23	2021 UEFA European Under-21 Championship qualification	10	3	1	6	12	21	-9
24	2023 UEFA European Under-21 Championship qualification	8	0	2	6	4	14	-10
25	2025 UEFA European Under-21 Championship qualification	10	3	0	7	13	24	-11
26	2027 UEFA European Under-21 Championship qualification	0	0	0	0	0	0	0
Total	12/26	92	17	16	59	79	182	-103

== Managerial history ==
- Asian Cup 1998, World Cup 1999
  - (Kazakhstan) Vladimir Fomichyov (1998–99)
- EURO 2004-06 Qualification
  - (Kazakhstan) Oyrat Saduov (2004)
  - (Kazakhstan) Anton Shokh (2005)
- EURO 2006-07 Qualification
  - (Netherlands) Anton Joore (2006)
- EURO 2008-09 Qualification
  - (Finland) Juha Malinen (2007)
  - (Netherlands) Anton Joore (2008)
  - (Kazakhstan) Evgeni Yarovenko (2008)
  - (Germany) Bernd Storck (2008)
- EURO 2009-10 Qualification
  - (Kazakhstan) Anton Shokh (February/March 2009)
  - (Kazakhstan) Sergei Gorokhovodatskiy (Caretaker) (March/June 2009)
  - (Belarus) Pavel Radnyonak (August 2009 - January 2011)
- EURO 2011-12 Qualification
  - (Serbia) Slobodan Krčmarević (May 2011 – December 2012)
- EURO 2013-14 Qualification
  - (Belarus) Sergei Borovsky (December 2012 – November 2013)
  - (Lithuania) Saulius Širmelis (2014/2015)
- EURO 2015-16 Qualification
  - (Kazakhstan) Vakhid Masudov (January/February 2016)
  - (Kazakhstan) Serik Abdualiyev (February/July 2016)
- EURO 2017-18 Qualification
  - (Kazakhstan) Vladimir Nikitenko (September 2017 – January 2018)
  - (Kazakhstan) Talgat Baysufinov (January 2018 – January 2019)
- EURO 2019-20 Qualification
  - (Kazakhstan) Alexandr Moskalenko (January 2019 – July 2020)
  - (Kazakhstan) Almas Kulshinbayev (July 2020 – December 2020)
- EURO 2021-22 Qualification and EURO 2023-24 Qualification campaigns
  - (Kazakhstan) Kairat Nurdauletov (December 2020 – current)
