= 2025 UEFA European Under-21 Championship qualification Group E =

Football tournament group stage

Group E of the 2025 UEFA European Under-21 Championship qualifying competition consists of six teams: Romania, Switzerland, Finland, Albania, Montenegro, and Armenia. The composition of the nine groups in the qualifying group stage was decided by the draw held on 2 February 2023 at the UEFA headquarters in Nyon, Switzerland, with the teams seeded according to their coefficient ranking.

== Standings ==
Pos	Team	Pld	W	D	L	GF	GA	GD	Pts	Qualification	Romania	Finland	Switzerland	Albania	Montenegro	Armenia
1	Romania	10	7	1	2	23	10	+13	22	Final tournament	—	1–0	3–1	5–0	1–0	2–0
2	Finland	10	6	2	2	21	8	+13	20	Play-offs	2–0	—	1–2	4–1	2–1	6–0
3	Switzerland	10	5	3	2	21	12	+9	18		2–2	1–1	—	1–2	4–2	5–0
4	Albania	10	5	1	4	12	17	−5	16		3–2	0–0	1–3	—	2–0	1–0
5	Montenegro	10	2	1	7	8	19	−11	7		2–6	1–2	0–2	1–0	—	0–0
6	Armenia	10	0	2	8	2	21	−19	2		0–1	1–3	0–0	1–2	0–1	—

Source: UEFA
Rules for classification: Tiebreakers

== Matches ==
Times are CET/CEST, (Note: CEST (UTC+2) for dates between 26 March and 29 October 2023 and between 31 March and 27 October 2024, and CET (UTC+1) for all other dates.) as listed by UEFA (local times, if different, are in parentheses).

8 September 2023
17:00 (19:00 AMT)

Armenia	1–2	Albania
Tarakhchyan 86'	Report	S. Shpendi 28'; Rexhepi 37'

City Stadium, Abovyan
Attendance: 1,200
Referee: Radoslav Gidzhenov (Bulgaria)

12 September 2023
17:00 (19:00 AMT)

Armenia	0–1	Montenegro
	Report	Tošković 85'

City Stadium, Abovyan
Attendance: 850
Referee: Edgars Maļcevs (Latvia)
12 September 2023
17:00 (18:00 EEST)

Finland	1–2	Switzerland
Liimatta 4'	Report	Muci 62'; Villiger 66'

Veritas Stadion, Turku
Attendance: 1,757
Referee: Atilla Karaoglan (Turkey)
12 September 2023
18:30

Albania	3–2	Romania
C. Shpendi 63'; Berisha 71'; Pajaziti 88'	Report	Grameni 47'; Borza 58'

Elbasan Arena, Elbasan
Attendance: 713
Referee: Bulat Sariyev (Kazakhstan)

13 October 2023
17:00 (18:00 EEST)

Finland	4–1	Albania
Liimatta 4', 6', 48'; Ylitolva 90+6'	Report	Pajaziti 80'

Veritas Stadion, Turku
Attendance: 2,247
Referee: Maria Sole Caputi (Italy)
13 October 2023
19:00

Switzerland	4–2	Montenegro
Rieder 22', 58'; Villiger 24'; Matoshi 30'	Report	Adžić 29'; Perović 86'

Stade de la Tuilière, Lausanne
Attendance: 5,666
Referee: Ivar Orri Kristjansson (Iceland)
13 October 2023
19:30 (20:30 EEST)

Romania	2–0	Armenia
Vulturar 37'; Baiaram 80'	Report

Stadionul Rapid-Giulești, Bucharest
Attendance: 2,346
Referee: Robertas Valikonis (Lithuania)

17 October 2023
14:30

Albania	2–0	Montenegro
Berisha 27' (pen.); S. Shpendi 73'	Report

Egnatia Arena, Rrogozhinë
Attendance: 512
Referee: Jarred Gavan Gillett (Australia)
17 October 2023
17:00 (19:00 AMT)

Armenia	0–0	Switzerland
	Report

Vazgen Sargsyan Republican Stadium, Yerevan
Attendance: 200
Referee: Ferenc Karakó (Hungary)
17 October 2023
17:00 (18:00 EEST)

Romania	1–0	Finland
M. Ilie 90+8'	Report

Stadionul Municipal, Sibiu
Attendance: 7,654
Referee: Luka Bilbija (Bosnia and Herzegovina)

17 November 2023
18:30

Switzerland	5–0	Armenia
Rieder 37' (pen.), 56' (pen.); Fink 51'; Sanches 71'; Muci 75'	Report

Stade de la Maladière, Neuchâtel
Attendance: 5,564
Referee: Kai Erik Steen (Norway)
17 November 2023
19:30 (20:30 EET)

Romania	5–0	Albania
Munteanu 7' (pen.); M. Ilie 15'; R. Ilie 37'; Grameni 55'; Danciu 86'	Report

Stadionul Rapid-Giulești, Bucharest
Attendance: 2,234
Referee: Matthew De Gabriele (Malta)

21 November 2023
17:00 (18:00 EET)

Finland	6–0	Armenia
Liimatta 25'; Keskinen 34', 53'; Talvitie 55'; Meriluoto 75'; Peltola 77'	Report

Veritas Stadion, Turku
Attendance: 678
Referee: Jérémy Muller (Luxembourg)
21 November 2023
18:30

Switzerland	2–2	Romania
Sanches 23'; Dos Santos Correia 88'	Report	R. Ilie 11'; Grameni 32'

Stade de la Maladière, Neuchâtel
Attendance: 5,359
Referee: Dominik Stary (Czechia)

22 March 2024
15:00

Montenegro	0–0	Armenia
	Report

Podgorica City Stadium, Podgorica
Attendance: 200
Referee: Goga Kikacheishvili (Georgia)
22 March 2024
17:00

Albania	0–0	Finland
	Report

Arena Kombëtare, Tirana
Attendance: 5,100
Referee: Michal Očenáš (Slovak)

26 March 2024
12:00 (15:00 AMT)

Armenia	0–1	Romania
	Report	Mihai 89'

Armavir City Stadium, Armavir
Attendance: 750
Referee: Damian Sylwestrzak (Poland)
26 March 2024
15:00

Montenegro	1–2	Finland
Đukanović 58'	Report	Koski 32'; Terho 87'

Podgorica City Stadium, Podgorica
Attendance: 150
Referee: Evangelos Manouchos (Greece)
26 March 2024
17:00

Albania	1–3	Switzerland
S. Shpendi 90+3'	Report	Surdez 28'; Sanches 59'; Keller 76'

Arena Kombëtare, Tirana
Attendance: 4,183
Referee: Adam Ladebäck (Sweden)

7 June 2024 (Note: The Montenegro v Albania match was originally to be played on 21 November 2023, 15:00.)
20:00

Montenegro	1–0	Albania
Franeta 90+2'	Report

DG Arena, Podgorica
Attendance: 200
Referee: Jonathan Lardot (Belgium)

6 September 2024
18:00 (20:00 AMT)

Armenia	1–3	Finland
Bashoyan 90+2'	Report	Liimatta 11'; Jukkola 17', 55'

FFA Academy Stadium, Yerevan
Attendance: 510
Referee: Igor Stojchevski (North Macedonia)
6 September 2024
18:30 (19:30 EEST)

Romania	1–0	Montenegro
Munteanu 8'	Report

Eugen Popescu, Târgoviște
Attendance: 5,954
Referee: David Dickinson (Scotland)
6 September 2024
19:30

Switzerland	1–2	Albania
Surdez 16'	Report	Pajaziti 18', 69'

Stade de la Tuilière, Lausanne
Attendance: 5,757
Referee: Atilla Karaoğlan (Turkey)

10 September 2024
17:00 (18:00 EEST)

Finland	2–0	Romania
Miettinen 22'; Liimatta 71'	Report

Tammelan Stadion, Tampere
Attendance: 2,014
Referee: Kristoffer Hagenes (Norway)
10 September 2024
19:30

Montenegro	0–2	Switzerland
	Report	Amenda 22'; Matoshi 27'

DG Arena, Podgorica
Attendance: 150
Referee: Christian-Petru Ciochirca (Austria)

11 October 2024
16:00

Montenegro	2–6	Romania
Janjić 21'; Mrvaljević 70'	Report	Munteanu 16', 27', 74'; R. Ilie 52'; Popescu 59'; Rădulescu 89'

City Stadium Nikšić, Nikšić
Attendance: 150
Referee: Jérémie Pignard (France)
11 October 2024
20:00

Switzerland	1–1	Finland
Jaquez 90+3'	Report	Terho 72'

Swissporarena, Lucerne
Attendance: 5,858
Referee: Alejandro Muñiz Ruiz (Spain)

15 October 2024
18:00

Albania	1–0	Armenia
Aventisian 57' (o.g.)	Report

Arena Kombëtare, Tirana
Attendance: 2,500
Referee: Kyriakos Athanasiou (Cyprus)
15 October 2024
18:00 (19:00 EEST)

Romania	3–1	Switzerland
Stoica 16', 35'; Akdağ 68'	Report	Hajdari 65'

Stadionul Rapid-Giulești, Bucharest
Attendance: 9,056
Referee: Marc Nagtegaal (Netherlands)
15 October 2024
19:00 (20:00 EEST)

Finland	2–1	Montenegro
Skyttä 10', 71'	Report	Naamo 5' (o.g.)

Tammelan Stadion, Tampere
Attendance: 3,916
Referee: Damian Kos (Poland)

== Goalscorers ==
There have been 87 goals scored in 30 matches, for an average of 2.9 goals per match.

7 goals

- (Finland) Otso Liimatta

5 goals

- (Romania) Louis Munteanu

4 goals

- (Albania) Adrion Pajaziti
- (Switzerland) Fabian Rieder

3 goals

- (Albania) Stiven Shpendi
- (Romania) Constantin Grameni
- (Romania) Rareș Ilie
- (Switzerland) Alvyn Sanches

2 goals

- (Albania) Medon Berisha
- (Finland) Oiva Jukkola
- (Finland) Topi Keskinen
- (Finland) Naatan Skyttä
- (Finland) Casper Terho
- (Romania) Matei Ilie
- (Romania) Ianis Stoica
- (Switzerland) Valmir Matoshi
- (Switzerland) Nikolas Muci
- (Switzerland) Frack Surdez
- (Switzerland) Lars Villiger

1 goal

- (Albania) Arlind Rexhepi
- (Albania) Cristian Shpendi
- (Armenia) Levon Bashoyan
- (Armenia) Gevorg Tarakhchyan
- (Finland) Ville Koski
- (Finland) Kai Meriluoto
- (Finland) Tony Miettinen
- (Finland) Matti Peltola
- (Finland) Juho Talvitie
- (Finland) Miska Ylitolva
- (Montenegro) Vasilije Adžić
- (Montenegro) Viktor Đukanović
- (Montenegro) Marko Franeta
- (Montenegro) Nikola Janjić
- (Montenegro) Balša Mrvaljević
- (Montenegro) Dejan Perović
- (Montenegro) Balša Tošković
- (Romania) Ümit Akdağ
- (Romania) Ștefan Baiaram
- (Romania) Andrei Borza
- (Romania) Marian Danciu
- (Romania) Cristian Mihai
- (Romania) Octavian Popescu
- (Romania) Mihnea Rădulescu
- (Romania) Cătălin Vulturar
- (Switzerland) Aurèle Amenda
- (Switzerland) Daniel Dos Santos Correia
- (Switzerland) Bradley Fink
- (Switzerland) Albian Hajdari
- (Switzerland) Luca Jaquez
- (Switzerland) Aaron Keller

1 own goal

- (Armenia) Aventis Aventisian (against Albania)
- (Finland) Dario Naamo (against Montenegro)
