= 2015 UEFA European Under-21 Championship squads =

Football team member listings

The following is a list of squads for all eight national teams that competed at the 2015 UEFA European Under-21 Championship. Each national team had to submit a final squad of 23 players, three of whom had to be goalkeepers. If a player was injured or ill severely enough to prevent his participation in the tournament before his team's first match, he could be replaced by another player.

Players in boldface have been capped at full international level either prior to the completion of the tournament or afterwards.

Age, caps, goals and club as of 17 June 2015.

== Group A ==
=== Czech Republic ===
On 25 May 2015, the Czech Republic named a 27-man provisional squad. On 7 June 2015, the final squad was announced.

Head coach: Jakub Dovalil

No.	Pos.	Player	Date of birth (age)	Caps	Goals	Club
1	GK	**Tomáš Koubek**	26 August 1992 (aged 22)	13	0	(Football Association of the Czech Republic) Hradec Králové
2	DF	**Pavel Kadeřábek**	25 April 1992 (aged 23)	4	0	(German Football Association) 1899 Hoffenheim
3	FW	**Václav Kadlec**	20 May 1992 (aged 23)	13	7	(Football Association of the Czech Republic) Sparta Prague
4	MF	Adam Jánoš	20 July 1992 (aged 22)	8	0	(Football Association of the Czech Republic) Vysočina Jihlava
5	DF	**Jakub Brabec**	6 August 1992 (aged 22)	10	0	(Football Association of the Czech Republic) Sparta Prague
6	MF	Ondřej Petrák	11 March 1992 (aged 23)	9	1	(German Football Association) 1. FC Nürnberg
7	MF	David Houska	29 June 1993 (aged 21)	12	0	(Football Association of the Czech Republic) Sigma Olomouc
8	MF	**Jaromír Zmrhal**	2 August 1993 (aged 21)	15	1	(Football Association of the Czech Republic) Slavia Prague
9	MF	**Jan Kliment**	1 September 1993 (aged 21)	0	0	(Football Association of the Czech Republic) Vysočina Jihlava
10	FW	**Jiří Skalák**	12 March 1992 (aged 23)	14	0	(Football Association of the Czech Republic) Mladá Boleslav
11	MF	**Martin Frýdek**	24 March 1992 (aged 23)	7	0	(Football Association of the Czech Republic) Slovan Liberec
12	MF	**Michal Trávník**	17 May 1994 (aged 21)	6	1	(Football Association of the Czech Republic) Slovácko
13	MF	**Ladislav Krejčí**	5 July 1992 (aged 22)	5	0	(Football Association of the Czech Republic) Sparta Prague
14	DF	Ladislav Takács	15 July 1996 (aged 18)	4	1	(Football Association of the Czech Republic) Teplice
15	DF	Jan Baránek	26 June 1993 (aged 21)	6	0	(Football Association of the Czech Republic) Viktoria Plzeň
16	GK	**Jiří Pavlenka**	14 April 1992 (aged 23)	5	0	(Football Association of the Czech Republic) Baník Ostrava
17	FW	Tomáš Přikryl	4 July 1992 (aged 22)	9	1	(Football Association of the Czech Republic) Dukla Prague
18	MF	**Lukáš Masopust**	12 February 1993 (aged 22)	7	0	(Football Association of the Czech Republic) Baumit Jablonec
19	DF	Matěj Hybš	3 January 1993 (aged 22)	8	0	(Football Association of the Czech Republic) Vysočina Jihlava
20	DF	**Jakub Jugas**	5 May 1992 (aged 23)	8	0	(Football Association of the Czech Republic) Zbrojovka Brno
21	DF	Matěj Hanousek	2 June 1993 (aged 22)	11	1	(Football Association of the Czech Republic) Dukla Prague
22	DF	**Tomáš Kalas**	15 May 1993 (aged 22)	19	0	(The Football Association) Chelsea
23	GK	Michal Reichl	14 September 1992 (aged 22)	1	0	(Football Association of the Czech Republic) Sigma Olomouc

=== Denmark ===
On 1 June 2015, Denmark named their squad. At the time, Jores Okore was in the selection, however Patrick Banggaard was named as a replacement, if Okore did not recover from his injury. The next day, Okore ruled himself out.

Head coach: Jess Thorup

No.	Pos.	Player	Date of birth (age)	Caps	Goals	Club
1	GK	Jakob Busk	12 September 1993 (aged 21)	12	0	(Norwegian Football Federation) Sandefjord
2	DF	Alexander Scholz	24 October 1992 (aged 22)	9	0	(Royal Belgian Football Association) Standard Liège
3	DF	**Frederik Sørensen**	14 April 1992 (aged 23)	15	0	(Italian Football Federation) Hellas Verona
4	DF	**Jannik Vestergaard**	3 August 1992 (aged 22)	24	3	(German Football Association) Werder Bremen
5	DF	**Jonas Knudsen**	16 September 1992 (aged 22)	13	0	(Danish Football Association) Esbjerg
6	DF	**Andreas Christensen**	10 April 1996 (aged 19)	15	1	(The Football Association) Chelsea
7	FW	**Viktor Fischer**	9 June 1994 (aged 21)	1	0	(Royal Dutch Football Association) Ajax
8	MF	Lasse Vigen Christensen	15 August 1994 (aged 20)	14	5	(The Football Association) Fulham
9	FW	**Yussuf Poulsen**	15 June 1994 (aged 21)	11	4	(German Football Association) RB Leipzig
10	MF	**Pierre-Emile Højbjerg**	5 August 1995 (aged 19)	5	4	(German Football Association) FC Augsburg
11	FW	**Uffe Bech**	13 January 1993 (aged 22)	5	1	(Danish Football Association) Nordsjælland
12	DF	Patrick Banggaard	4 April 1994 (aged 21)	6	1	(Danish Football Association) Midtjylland
13	DF	**Riza Durmisi**	8 January 1994 (aged 21)	6	1	(Danish Football Association) Brøndby
14	DF	Christoffer Remmer	16 January 1993 (aged 22)	10	2	(Danish Football Association) Copenhagen
15	MF	**Nicolaj Thomsen**	8 May 1993 (aged 22)	17	3	(Danish Football Association) AaB
16	GK	**Frederik Rønnow**	4 August 1992 (aged 22)	13	0	(Danish Football Association) Horsens
17	MF	**Christian Nørgaard**	10 March 1994 (aged 21)	7	0	(Danish Football Association) Brøndby
18	MF	**Rasmus Falk Jensen**	15 January 1992 (aged 23)	8	1	(Danish Football Association) OB
19	MF	**Jens Jønsson**	10 January 1993 (aged 22)	12	2	(Danish Football Association) AGF
20	FW	Nicolai Brock-Madsen	9 January 1993 (aged 22)	14	7	(Danish Football Association) Randers
21	FW	Emil Berggreen	10 May 1993 (aged 22)	5	1	(German Football Association) Eintracht Braunschweig
22	GK	David Jensen	25 March 1992 (aged 23)	4	0	(Danish Football Association) Nordsjælland
23	MF	**Pione Sisto**	4 February 1995 (aged 20)	0	0	(Danish Football Association) Midtjylland

=== Germany ===
On 26 May 2015, Germany named a 28-man provisional squad. The final squad was announced on 7 June 2015.

Head coach: Horst Hrubesch

No.	Pos.	Player	Date of birth (age)	Caps	Goals	Club
1	GK	**Bernd Leno**	4 March 1992 (aged 23)	14	0	(German Football Association) Bayer Leverkusen
2	DF	Julian Korb	21 March 1992 (aged 23)	6	0	(German Football Association) Borussia Mönchengladbach
3	DF	**Christian Günter**	28 February 1993 (aged 22)	6	0	(German Football Association) SC Freiburg
4	DF	**Matthias Ginter**	19 January 1994 (aged 21)	10	0	(German Football Association) Borussia Dortmund
5	DF	**Nico Schulz**	1 April 1993 (aged 22)	10	1	(German Football Association) Hertha BSC
6	MF	Johannes Geis	17 August 1993 (aged 21)	10	0	(German Football Association) Mainz 05
7	MF	Leonardo Bittencourt	19 December 1993 (aged 21)	16	3	(German Football Association) Hannover 96
8	MF	**Yunus Mallı** (Note: Capped for Turkey)	24 February 1992 (aged 23)	10	1	(German Football Association) Mainz 05
9	FW	**Kevin Volland** (captain)	30 July 1992 (aged 22)	18	9	(German Football Association) 1899 Hoffenheim
10	MF	Moritz Leitner	8 December 1992 (aged 22)	23	7	(German Football Association) VfB Stuttgart
11	MF	**Emre Can**	12 January 1994 (aged 21)	12	0	(The Football Association) Liverpool
12	GK	**Marc-André ter Stegen**	30 April 1992 (aged 23)	9	0	(Royal Spanish Football Federation) Barcelona
13	FW	Philipp Hofmann	30 March 1993 (aged 22)	15	9	(German Football Association) 1. FC Kaiserslautern
14	MF	**Kerem Demirbay**	3 July 1993 (aged 21)	0	0	(German Football Association) 1. FC Kaiserslautern
15	FW	**Serge Gnabry**	14 July 1995 (aged 19)	3	0	(The Football Association) Arsenal
16	DF	Robin Knoche	22 May 1992 (aged 23)	12	2	(German Football Association) VfL Wolfsburg
17	MF	**Joshua Kimmich**	8 February 1995 (aged 20)	4	0	(German Football Association) RB Leipzig
18	MF	**Maximilian Arnold**	27 May 1994 (aged 21)	8	0	(German Football Association) VfL Wolfsburg
19	MF	**Amin Younes**	6 August 1993 (aged 21)	14	3	(German Football Association) 1. FC Kaiserslautern
20	MF	**Max Meyer**	18 September 1995 (aged 19)	5	1	(German Football Association) Schalke 04
21	MF	Felix Klaus	13 September 1992 (aged 22)	2	0	(German Football Association) SC Freiburg
22	DF	Dominique Heintz	15 August 1993 (aged 21)	5	1	(German Football Association) 1. FC Kaiserslautern
23	GK	Timo Horn	12 May 1993 (aged 22)	4	0	(German Football Association) 1. FC Köln

=== Serbia ===
On 29 May 2015, Serbia named their squad.

Head coach: Mladen Dodić

No.	Pos.	Player	Date of birth (age)	Caps	Goals	Club
1	GK	**Marko Dmitrović**	24 January 1992 (aged 23)	15	0	(The Football Association) Charlton Athletic
2	MF	Aleksandar Kovačević	9 January 1992 (aged 23)	10	0	(Football Association of Serbia) Red Star
3	DF	**Marko Petković**	3 September 1992 (aged 22)	18	0	(Football Association of Serbia) Red Star
4	MF	**Srđan Mijailović**	10 November 1993 (aged 21)	12	0	(Turkish Football Federation) Kayserispor
5	DF	Uroš Ćosić	24 October 1992 (aged 22)	10	0	(Italian Football Federation) Pescara
6	DF	Aleksandar Pantić	11 April 1992 (aged 23)	16	1	(Royal Spanish Football Federation) Córdoba
7	MF	Goran Čaušić	5 May 1992 (aged 23)	10	1	(Turkish Football Federation) Eskişehirspor
8	MF	**Mirko Ivanić** (Note: Capped for Montenegro)	13 September 1993 (aged 21)	0	0	(Football Association of Serbia) Vojvodina
9	FW	**Aleksandar Pešić**	21 May 1992 (aged 23)	9	3	(French Football Federation) Toulouse
10	MF	**Filip Đuričić**	30 January 1992 (aged 23)	16	3	(Portuguese Football Federation) Benfica
11	FW	Aleksandar Čavrić	18 May 1994 (aged 21)	4	0	(Royal Belgian Football Association) Genk
12	GK	Nikola Perić	4 February 1992 (aged 23)	5	5	(Football Association of Serbia) Jagodina
13	DF	**Nemanja Petrović**	17 April 1992 (aged 23)	8	0	(Football Association of Serbia) Partizan
14	MF	**Darko Brašanac**	12 February 1992 (aged 23)	12	1	(Football Association of Serbia) Partizan
15	DF	**Uroš Spajić**	13 February 1993 (aged 22)	10	0	(French Football Federation) Toulouse
16	FW	Luka Milunović	21 December 1992 (aged 22)	16	5	(Hellenic Football Federation) Platanias
17	DF	Aleksandar Filipović	20 December 1994 (aged 20)	1	0	(Football Association of Serbia) Jagodina
18	MF	**Miloš Jojić**	19 March 1992 (aged 23)	16	3	(German Football Association) Borussia Dortmund
19	FW	Nikola Trujic	14 April 1992 (aged 23)	8	1	(Football Association of Serbia) Napredak Kruševac
20	DF	Lazar Ćirković	22 August 1992 (aged 22)	4	0	(Football Association of Serbia) Partizan
21	FW	Slavoljub Srnić	12 January 1992 (aged 23)	3	2	(Football Association of Serbia) Čukarički
22	DF	**Filip Stojković** (Note: Capped for Montenegro)	22 January 1993 (aged 22)	3	0	(Football Association of Serbia) Čukarički
23	GK	Nemanja Stevanović	5 May 1992 (aged 23)	0	0	(Football Association of Serbia) Čukarički

== Group B ==
=== England ===
On 20 May 2015, England named a 27-man provisional squad. On 2 June 2015, they named their final squad. On 18 June 2015, Benik Afobe replaced the injured Saido Berahino.

Head coach: Gareth Southgate

No.	Pos.	Player	Date of birth (age)	Caps	Goals	Club
1	GK	**Jack Butland**	10 March 1993 (aged 22)	29	0	(The Football Association) Stoke City
2	DF	**Carl Jenkinson**	8 February 1992 (aged 23)	19	2	(The Football Association) Arsenal
3	DF	Luke Garbutt	21 May 1993 (aged 22)	11	0	(The Football Association) Everton
4	MF	Jake Forster-Caskey	25 April 1994 (aged 21)	9	1	(The Football Association) Brighton & Hove Albion
5	DF	**John Stones**	28 May 1994 (aged 21)	17	0	(The Football Association) Everton
6	DF	Ben Gibson	15 January 1993 (aged 22)	7	1	(The Football Association) Middlesbrough
7	MF	Alex Pritchard	3 May 1993 (aged 22)	10	0	(The Football Association) Tottenham Hotspur
8	MF	**James Ward-Prowse**	1 November 1994 (aged 20)	14	3	(The Football Association) Southampton
9	FW	**Harry Kane**	28 July 1993 (aged 21)	18	12	(The Football Association) Tottenham Hotspur
10	MF	Tom Carroll	28 May 1992 (aged 23)	19	2	(The Football Association) Tottenham Hotspur
11	MF	**Nathan Redmond**	6 March 1994 (aged 21)	24	5	(The Football Association) Norwich City
12	GK	Jonathan Bond	19 May 1993 (aged 22)	5	0	(The Football Association) Watford
13	GK	Marcus Bettinelli	24 May 1992 (aged 23)	1	0	(The Football Association) Fulham
14	MF	**Nathaniel Chalobah**	12 December 1994 (aged 20)	23	0	(The Football Association) Chelsea
15	DF	**Michael Keane**	11 January 1993 (aged 22)	16	3	(The Football Association) Burnley
16	MF	**Jesse Lingard**	15 December 1992 (aged 22)	16	5	(The Football Association) Manchester United
17	FW	**Danny Ings**	23 July 1992 (aged 22)	16	4	(The Football Association) Burnley
18	FW	**Benik Afobe** (Note: Capped for DR Congo)	12 February 1993 (aged 22)	8	1	(The Football Association) Wolverhampton Wanderers
19	MF	Will Hughes	17 April 1995 (aged 20)	25	2	(The Football Association) Derby County
20	DF	**Liam Moore** (Note: Capped for Jamaica)	31 January 1993 (aged 22)	18	1	(The Football Association) Leicester City
21	DF	**Calum Chambers**	20 January 1995 (aged 20)	7	0	(The Football Association) Arsenal
22	DF	Matt Targett	18 September 1995 (aged 19)	1	0	(The Football Association) Southampton
23	MF	**Ruben Loftus-Cheek**	23 January 1996 (aged 19)	12	0	(The Football Association) Chelsea

=== Italy ===
On 1 June 2015, Italy named a 27-man provisional squad. On 7 June 2015, they named their final squad.

Head coach: Luigi Di Biagio

No.	Pos.	Player	Date of birth (age)	Caps	Goals	Club
1	GK	Francesco Bardi	18 January 1992 (aged 23)			(Italian Football Federation) Inter Milan
2	DF	Stefano Sabelli	13 January 1993 (aged 22)			(Italian Football Federation) Bari
3	DF	**Cristiano Biraghi**	1 September 1992 (aged 22)			(Italian Football Federation) Inter Milan
4	MF	Lorenzo Crisetig	20 January 1993 (aged 22)			(Italian Football Federation) Inter Milan
5	DF	**Daniele Rugani**	29 July 1994 (aged 20)			(Italian Football Federation) Empoli
6	DF	**Alessio Romagnoli**	12 January 1995 (aged 20)			(Italian Football Federation) Roma
7	MF	Federico Viviani	24 March 1992 (aged 23)			(Italian Football Federation) Roma
8	MF	**Stefano Sturaro**	9 March 1993 (aged 22)			(Italian Football Federation) Juventus
9	FW	**Andrea Belotti**	20 December 1993 (aged 21)			(Italian Football Federation) Palermo
10	FW	**Domenico Berardi**	1 August 1994 (aged 20)			(Italian Football Federation) Sassuolo
11	FW	**Federico Bernardeschi**	16 February 1994 (aged 21)			(Italian Football Federation) Fiorentina
12	DF	Federico Barba	1 September 1993 (aged 21)			(Italian Football Federation) Empoli
13	DF	Matteo Bianchetti (captain)	17 March 1993 (aged 22)			(Italian Football Federation) Hellas Verona
14	GK	Marco Sportiello	10 May 1992 (aged 23)			(Italian Football Federation) Atalanta
15	MF	Marco Benassi	8 September 1994 (aged 20)			(Italian Football Federation) Torino
16	MF	**Daniele Baselli**	12 March 1992 (aged 23)			(Italian Football Federation) Atalanta
17	DF	**Armando Izzo**	2 March 1992 (aged 23)			(Italian Football Federation) Genoa
18	MF	Cristian Battocchio	10 February 1992 (aged 23)			(Italian Football Federation) Virtus Entella
19	FW	Marcello Trotta	29 September 1992 (aged 22)			(Italian Football Federation) Avellino
20	GK	Nicola Leali	17 February 1993 (aged 22)			(Italian Football Federation) Juventus
21	MF	Danilo Cataldi	6 August 1994 (aged 20)			(Italian Football Federation) Lazio
22	DF	**Davide Zappacosta**	23 June 1992 (aged 22)			(Italian Football Federation) Atalanta
23	FW	**Simone Verdi**	12 July 1992 (aged 22)			(Italian Football Federation) Empoli

=== Portugal ===
On 1 June 2015, Portugal named a 25-man provisional squad.

Head coach: Rui Jorge

No.	Pos.	Player	Date of birth (age)	Caps	Goals	Club
1	GK	**José Sá**	17 January 1993 (aged 22)	11	0	(Portuguese Football Federation) Marítimo
2	DF	Ricardo Esgaio	16 May 1993 (aged 22)	13	3	(Portuguese Football Federation) Académica de Coimbra
3	DF	Tiago Ilori	26 February 1993 (aged 22)	6	1	(The Football Association) Liverpool
4	DF	**Paulo Oliveira**	8 January 1992 (aged 23)	18	1	(Portuguese Football Federation) Sporting CP
5	DF	**Raphaël Guerreiro**	22 December 1993 (aged 21)	8	0	(French Football Federation) Lorient
6	MF	**William Carvalho**	7 April 1992 (aged 23)	10	2	(Portuguese Football Federation) Sporting CP
7	MF	**Rafa Silva**	17 May 1993 (aged 22)	11	3	(Portuguese Football Federation) Braga
8	MF	**Sérgio Oliveira** (captain)	2 June 1992 (aged 23)	18	3	(Portuguese Football Federation) Paços de Ferreira
9	FW	**Gonçalo Paciência**	1 August 1994 (aged 20)	4	0	(Portuguese Football Federation) Porto
10	MF	**Bernardo Silva**	10 August 1994 (aged 20)	9	5	(French Football Federation) Monaco
11	FW	Iuri Medeiros	10 July 1994 (aged 20)	4	0	(Portuguese Football Federation) Arouca
12	GK	Daniel Fernandes	13 November 1992 (aged 22)	6	0	(German Football Association) SC Paderborn
13	DF	**João Cancelo**	27 May 1994 (aged 21)	3	0	(Royal Spanish Football Federation) Valencia
14	DF	Tobias Figueiredo	2 February 1994 (aged 21)	2	0	(Portuguese Football Federation) Sporting CP
15	DF	Frederico Venâncio	4 February 1993 (aged 22)	2	0	(Portuguese Football Federation) Vitória de Setúbal
16	MF	**Rúben Neves**	13 March 1997 (aged 18)	6	1	(Portuguese Football Federation) Porto
17	FW	**Carlos Mané** (Note: Capped for Guinea-Bissau)	11 March 1994 (aged 21)	9	2	(Portuguese Football Federation) Sporting CP
18	FW	**Ivan Cavaleiro**	18 October 1993 (aged 21)	10	6	(Portuguese Football Federation) Benfica
19	FW	**Ricardo Horta**	15 September 1994 (aged 20)	5	0	(Royal Spanish Football Federation) Málaga
20	MF	Tozé	14 January 1993 (aged 22)	10	0	(Portuguese Football Federation) Estoril
21	FW	**Ricardo Pereira**	6 October 1993 (aged 21)	14	6	(Portuguese Football Federation) Porto
22	GK	**Bruno Varela** (Note: Capped for Cape Verde)	4 November 1994 (aged 20)	1	0	(Portuguese Football Federation) Benfica
23	MF	**João Mário**	19 January 1993 (aged 22)	8	1	(Portuguese Football Federation) Sporting CP

=== Sweden ===
On 2 June 2015, Sweden named their squad. On 15 June 2015, defender Emil Krafth was ruled out of the tournament after a back injury, being replaced by defender Victor Lindelöf.

Head coach: Håkan Ericson

No.	Pos.	Player	Date of birth (age)	Caps	Goals	Club
1	GK	**Patrik Carlgren**	8 January 1992 (aged 23)	13	0	(Swedish Football Association) AIK
2	DF	**Victor Lindelöf**	17 July 1994 (aged 20)	4	0	(Portuguese Football Federation) Benfica
3	DF	**Alexander Milošević**	30 January 1992 (aged 23)	20	3	(Turkish Football Federation) Beşiktaş
4	DF	**Filip Helander**	22 April 1993 (aged 22)	14	0	(Swedish Football Association) Malmö FF
5	DF	**Ludwig Augustinsson**	21 April 1994 (aged 21)	11	0	(Danish Football Association) Copenhagen
6	MF	**Oscar Lewicki**	14 July 1992 (aged 22)	22	2	(Swedish Football Association) Malmö FF
7	MF	**Oscar Hiljemark** (captain)	28 June 1992 (aged 22)	32	3	(Royal Dutch Football Association) PSV Eindhoven
8	MF	**Abdul Khalili**	7 June 1992 (aged 23)	8	0	(Turkish Football Federation) Mersin İdman Yurdu
9	FW	**Branimir Hrgota**	12 January 1993 (aged 22)	13	3	(German Football Association) Borussia Mönchengladbach
10	FW	**John Guidetti**	15 April 1992 (aged 23)	18	10	(Scottish Football Association) Celtic
11	FW	**Isaac Kiese Thelin**	24 June 1992 (aged 22)	6	6	(French Football Federation) Bordeaux
12	GK	**Jacob Rinne**	20 June 1993 (aged 21)	3	0	(Swedish Football Association) Örebro SK
13	MF	**Arbër Zeneli** (Note: Capped for Kosovo)	25 February 1995 (aged 20)	5	1	(Swedish Football Association) IF Elfsborg
14	FW	**Mikael Ishak**	31 March 1993 (aged 22)	21	10	(Danish Football Association) Randers
15	MF	**Kristoffer Olsson**	30 June 1995 (aged 19)	10	3	(Danish Football Association) Midtjylland
16	MF	**Simon Tibbling**	7 September 1994 (aged 20)	14	0	(Royal Dutch Football Association) Groningen
17	DF	Joseph Baffoe	7 November 1992 (aged 22)	13	0	(Swedish Football Association) Halmstads BK
18	DF	**Sebastian Holmén**	29 April 1992 (aged 23)	12	0	(Swedish Football Association) IF Elfsborg
19	MF	**Sam Larsson**	10 April 1993 (aged 22)	7	1	(Royal Dutch Football Association) Heerenveen
20	MF	**Robin Quaison**	9 October 1993 (aged 21)	12	0	(Italian Football Federation) Palermo
21	DF	**Pa Konate** (Note: Capped for Guinea)	25 April 1994 (aged 21)	6	0	(Swedish Football Association) Malmö FF
22	MF	**Simon Gustafson**	11 January 1995 (aged 20)	7	3	(Swedish Football Association) BK Häcken
23	GK	**Andreas Linde**	24 July 1993 (aged 21)	4	0	(Norwegian Football Federation) Molde
