= Czech Republic national under-21 football team =

National under-21 football team of the Czech Republic

Czech Republic Under-21
- Nickname: Lvíčata (Baby Lions)
- Association: Fotbalová asociace České republiky (FAČR)
- Confederation: UEFA (Europe)
- Head coach: Michal Bílek
- Most caps: Jan Polák (45)
- Top scorer: Tomáš Pekhart (17)
First colours	Second colours

First international
- Czech Republic 1–0 Malta (Opava, Czech Republic; 5 September 1994)

Biggest win
- Czech Republic 8–0 Bulgaria (Teplice, Czech Republic; 5 October 2001); Czech Republic 8–0 Liechtenstein (Prague, Czech Republic; 11 September 2007); Czech Republic 8–0 San Marino (Serravalle, San Marino; 9 June 2009); Czech Republic 8–0 Andorra (Mladá Boleslav, Czech Republic; 10 August 2011)

Biggest defeat
- Denmark 5–0 Czech Republic (Vejle, Denmark; 10 September 2024) Records are for competitive matches only

UEFA U-21 Championship
- Appearances: 9 (first in 1996)
- Best result: Winners (2002)

The Czech Republic national under-21 football team is the national under-21 association football team of the Czech Republic and is controlled by the Football Association of the Czech Republic. The team competes in the UEFA European Under-21 Championship, held every two years.

Although the breakup of Czechoslovakia occurred officially on 1 January 1993, the under-21 team continued until the end of the 1994 championship. After that, the Czech Republic and the Slovakia under-21s became separate footballing entities.

For both nations, the first matches were played in September 1994 in qualification for the 1996 championship.

The Czech Republic under-21 team reached the quarter-finals in 1996, but failed to qualify for 1998. The team reached the final in both the 2000 and 2002 tournaments, winning the latter on penalties.

Subsequently, the team failed to qualify for the tournaments in 2004 and 2006. They qualified for the 2007 competition but finished last in the group stage. They once again failed to qualify for the 2009 competition. In the 2011 UEFA European Under-21 Championship, they placed fourth.

== Competitive record ==
=== Summer Olympics record ===
Summer Olympic record
Year	Round	Position	GP	W	D*	L	GS	GA	Squad
(Spain) 1992	did not qualify								
(United States) 1996	did not qualify								
(Australia) 2000	Group stage	14th	3	0	2	1	5	6	Squad
(Greece) 2004	did not qualify								
(China) 2008	did not qualify								
(United Kingdom) 2012	did not qualify								
(Brazil) 2016	did not qualify								
(Japan) 2020	did not qualify								
(France) 2024	did not qualify								
(United States) 2028	to be determined								
(Australia) 2032	to be determined								
Total	Group stage	14th	3	0	2	1	5	6	

=== UEFA European Under-21 Championship record ===
- 1978 to 1994 – see Czechoslovakia

UEFA European Under-21 Championship record								UEFA European Under-21 Championship Qualification record					
Year	Round	Pld	W	D*	L	GF	GA	Pld	W	D	L	GF	GA
(Spain) 1996	Quarter-finals	2	0	0	2	2	4	10	7	2	1	33	9
(Romania) 1998	did not qualify							8	3	0	5	13	13
(Slovakia) 2000	Runners-up	4	2	1	1	9	7	12	9	1	2	20	6
(Switzerland) 2002	Winners	5	2	2	1	5	5	12	9	2	1	29	6
(Germany) 2004	did not qualify							10	7	0	3	20	7
(Portugal) 2006	did not qualify							12	6	3	3	26	11
(Netherlands) 2007	Group stage	3	0	1	2	1	4	4	3	1	0	7	3
(Sweden) 2009	did not qualify							8	4	2	2	19	5
(Denmark) 2011	Fourth place	5	2	0	3	4	6	10	9	1	0	30	4
(Israel) 2013	did not qualify							10	6	3	1	26	7
(Czech Republic) 2015	Group stage	3	1	1	1	6	3	Qualified as hosts					
(Poland) 2017	Group stage	3	1	0	2	5	7	10	7	2	1	29	10
(Italy) (San Marino) 2019	did not qualify							10	5	1	4	14	15
(Hungary) (Slovenia) 2021	Group stage	3	0	2	1	2	4	10	6	3	1	20	4
(Romania) (Georgia (country)) 2023	Group stage	3	1	0	2	2	4	10	7	1	2	23	6
(Slovakia) 2025	Group stage	3	1	0	2	5	7	10	5	3	2	16	12
(Albania) (Serbia) 2027	qualified							10	5	3	2	17	6
Total	11/17	33	9	7	17	39	51	156	99	28	30	342	124

*Draws include knockout matches decided by penalty shootout.

== Individual awards ==
In addition to team victories, Czech players have won individual awards at the UEFA European Under-21 Football Championship.

Year	Golden Player	Golden Boot
(Switzerland) 2002	Petr Čech	
(Czech Republic) 2015		Jan Kliment

== UEFA European Under-21 Championship ==
=== 2025 UEFA European Under-21 Championship qualification ===
Pos	Team	Pld	W	D	L	GF	GA	GD	Pts	Qualification	Denmark	Czech Republic	Wales	Iceland	Lithuania
1	Denmark	8	5	2	1	18	8	+10	17	Final tournament	—	5–0	2–2	2–0	3–0
2	Czech Republic	8	4	2	2	13	11	+2	14 (Note: Head-to-head points: Czech Republic 4, Wales 1)	Play-offs	0–0	—	1–1	4–1	3–0
3	Wales	8	4	2	2	13	11	+2	14		1–2	1–2	—	1–0	2–1
4	Iceland	8	3	0	5	9	14	−5	9		4–2	2–1	1–2	—	0–2
5	Lithuania	8	1	0	7	7	16	−9	3		1–2	1–2	2–3	0–1	—

Source: UEFA
Legend: Blue = home team win; Yellow = draw; Red = away team win.
Rules for classification: Tiebreakers

==== 2025 UEFA European Under-21 Championship play-offs ====
The three play-off winners qualify for the final tournament.

Team 1	Agg.	Team 2	1st leg	2nd leg
Finland	6–3	Norway	5–1	1–2
Belgium	1–3	Czech Republic	0–2	1–1
Georgia	3–3 (7–6 p)	Croatia	1–0	2–3 (a.e.t.)

=== 2025 UEFA European Under-21 Championship (Final tournament) group stage ===
Pos	Team	Pld	W	D	L	GF	GA	GD	Pts	Qualification	GER	ENG	CZE	SVN
1	Germany	3	3	0	0	9	3	+6	9	Knockout stage	—			
2	England	3	1	1	1	4	3	+1	4	Knockout stage		—		
3	Czech Republic	3	1	0	2	5	7	−2	3				—	
4	Slovenia	3	0	1	2	0	5	−5	1					—

Source: UEFA
Legend: Blue = home team win; Yellow = draw; Red = away team win.
Rules for classification: Group stage tiebreakers

== Results and fixtures ==
Win Draw Loss

=== 2026 ===
27 March 2026 2027 UEFA U-21 Qualification	Scotland	0–0	Czech Republic	Dundee, Scotland
20:00 (19:00 UTC+0)		Report		Stadium: Dens Park; Attendance: 1,268; Referee: Alejandro Muñiz Ruiz (Spain)

31 March 2026 2027 UEFA U-21 Qualification	Czech Republic	5–0	Gibraltar	Chomutov, Czech Republic
17:00	Šiler 14'; Kričfaluši 45+3' (pen.); Mikulenka 47', 86', 89'	Report		Stadium: Letní stadion Attendance: 2,021; Referee: Peiman Simani (Finland)

30 September 2026 2027 UEFA U-21 Qualification	Czech Republic	1–0	Bulgaria	Hradec Králové, Czech Republic
18:00	Mašek 55'	Report		Stadium: Malšovická aréna Attendance: 7,030; Referee: Damian Kos (Poland)

6 October 2026 2027 UEFA U-21 Qualification	Portugal	2–0	Czech Republic	Leiria, Portugal
18:30 (17:30 UTC+1)	Banjaqui 28'; A. Moreira 55'	Report		Stadium: Estádio Dr. Magalhães Pessoa; Attendance: 4,021; Referee: Adam Ladebäck (Sweden)

13 November 2026 2027 UEFA U-21 Qualification play-offs	Turkey	0–1	Czech Republic	Rize, Turkey
17:00 (19:00 UTC+3)		Report	Kačor 48'	Stadium: Rize City Stadium; Attendance: 10,471; Referee: Jakob Sundberg (Denmark)

13 November 2026 2027 UEFA U-21 Qualification play-offs	Czech Republic	1–1	Turkey	Hradec Králové, Czech Republic
17:00	Škrkoň 35'	Report	İlkhan 82'	Stadium: Malšovická aréna Attendance: 8,017; Referee: Granit Maqedonci (Sweden)

== Players ==
=== Current squad ===
The following players are in the nomination for the 2027 UEFA European Under-21 Championship qualification play-offs against Turkey on 13 and 17 November 2026.

Caps and goals updated as of 17 November after the match against Turkey.

No.	Pos.	Player	Date of birth (age)	Caps	Goals	Club
	GK	Adam Dvořák	28 July 2004 (age 22)	1	0	(Latvian Football Federation) FS Jelgava
	GK	Martin Hrubý	22 March 2004 (age 22)	0	0	(Football Association of the Czech Republic) Baník Ostrava
	GK	Jan Koutný	14 October 2004 (age 22)	11	0	(Football Association of the Czech Republic) Sigma Olomouc
	DF	Mikuláš Konečný	2 June 2006 (age 20)	7	0	(Football Association of the Czech Republic) Slavia Prague
	DF	Filip Lissah	8 December 2004 (age 21)	7	1	(Scottish Football Association) Falkirk
	DF	Jiří Míček	7 June 2007 (age 19)	2	0	(Football Association of the Czech Republic) Baník Ostrava
	DF	Šimon Slončík	15 May 2007 (age 19)	2	0	(Football Association of the Czech Republic) Slovácko
	DF	Matěj Žitný	6 January 2005 (age 21)	1	0	(Football Association of the Czech Republic) Viktoria Žižkov
	MF	Tobias Boledovič	16 September 2006 (age 20)	1	0	(Football Association of the Czech Republic) Pardubice
	MF	Alexandr Bužek	2 August 2004 (age 22)	10	0	(Football Association of the Czech Republic) Slovan Liberec
	MF	Tomáš Jelínek	27 December 2005 (age 20)	12	0	(Football Association of the Czech Republic) Slavia Prague
	MF	Pavel Kačor	12 September 2006 (age 20)	6	1	(Football Association of the Czech Republic) Slavia Prague
	MF	Albert Labík	13 May 2004 (age 22)	17	0	(Football Association of the Czech Republic) Artis Brno
	MF	Dominik Pech	4 September 2006 (age 20)	8	0	(Swiss Football Association) Young Boys
	MF	David Planka	28 July 2005 (age 21)	9	1	(Football Association of the Czech Republic) Baník Ostrava
	MF	Matěj Šín	2 June 2004 (age 22)	14	1	(Royal Dutch Football Association) ADO Den Haag
	MF	Tom Slončík	21 December 2004 (age 21)	10	0	(Football Association of the Czech Republic) Hradec Králové
	MF	Hugo Sochůrek	7 June 2008 (age 18)	3	0	(Football Association of the Czech Republic) Sparta Prague
	FW	Yannick Eduardo	23 January 2006 (age 20)	8	2	(Royal Dutch Football Association) Dordrecht
	FW	Lukáš Mašek	8 May 2004 (age 22)	10	5	(Football Association of the Czech Republic) Slovan Liberec
	FW	Matěj Mikulenka	5 February 2004 (age 22)	8	3	(Football Association of the Czech Republic) Slovan Liberec
	FW	Vít Škrkoň	9 April 2008 (age 18)	4	1	(Football Association of the Czech Republic) Baník Ostrava
	FW	Tadeáš Vachoušek	11 January 2004 (age 22)	1	0	(Football Association of the Czech Republic) Zbrojovka Brno
	FW	Matyáš Vojta	26 February 2004 (age 22)	13	1	(Football Association of the Czech Republic) Sparta Prague

=== Recent call-ups ===
The following players have previously been called up to the under-21 squad in the last 12 months and remain eligible for selection.

Pos.	Player	Date of birth (age)	Caps	Goals	Club	Latest call-up
GK	Colin Andrew	25 February 2004 (age 22)	0	0	(Czech Republic) Zbrojovka Brno	v. Gibraltar, 31 March 2026
DF	Eric Hunal	21 January 2005 (age 21)	6	0	(Czech Republic) Zbrojovka Brno	v. Portugal, 18 September 2026
DF	Adam Ševínský	19 June 2004 (age 22)	9	0	(Czech Republic) Sparta Prague	v. Portugal, 18 September 2026
DF	Ondřej Kričfaluši	9 March 2004 (age 22)	17	2	(Belgium) Union Saint-Gilloise	v. Azerbaijan, 25 September 2026 ^{WD}
DF	Jan Chytrý	13 May 2004 (age 22)	5	0	(Czech Republic) Karviná	v. Gibraltar, 31 March 2026
DF	Ondřej Čoudek	25 October 2004 (age 22)	3	0	(Czech Republic) Artis Brno	v. Gibraltar, 31 March 2026
DF	Tomáš Král	26 October 2004 (age 22)	3	0	(Czech Republic) Slovácko	v. Gibraltar, 31 March 2026
DF	Sebastian Pech	5 January 2009 (age 17)	0	0	(Czech Republic) Teplice	v. Gibraltar, 31 March 2026
MF	Milan Lexa	21 August 2004 (age 22)	1	0	(Czech Republic) Slovan Liberec	v. Portugal, 18 September 2026
MF	Lukáš Ambros	5 June 2004 (age 22)	9	1	(Belgium) Anderlecht	v. Gibraltar, 31 March 2026
MF	Roman Horák	25 February 2005 (age 21)	2	0	(Czech Republic) Jablonec	v. Gibraltar, 31 March 2026
MF	Lukáš Penxa	6 June 2004 (age 22)	0	0	(Czech Republic) Dukla Prague	v. Gibraltar, 31 March 2026
FW	Radek Šiler	10 September 2004 (age 22)	1	1	(Portugal) Rio Ave	v. Gibraltar, 31 March 2026

^{WD} = Withdrew due to non-injury related reasons.

=== Previous squads ===
- 1996 UEFA European Under-21 Football Championship squads – Czech Republic
- 2000 UEFA European Under-21 Football Championship squads – Czech Republic
- 2002 UEFA European Under-21 Football Championship squads – Czech Republic
- 2007 UEFA European Under-21 Football Championship squads – Czech Republic
- 2011 UEFA European Under-21 Football Championship squads – Czech Republic
- 2015 UEFA European Under-21 Football Championship squads – Czech Republic
- 2017 UEFA European Under-21 Football Championship squads – Czech Republic
- 2021 UEFA European Under-21 Football Championship squads – Czech Republic
- 2023 UEFA European Under-21 Football Championship squads – Czech Republic
- 2025 UEFA European Under-21 Football Championship squads – Czech Republic

=== Most appearances ===
As of 18 November 2026.

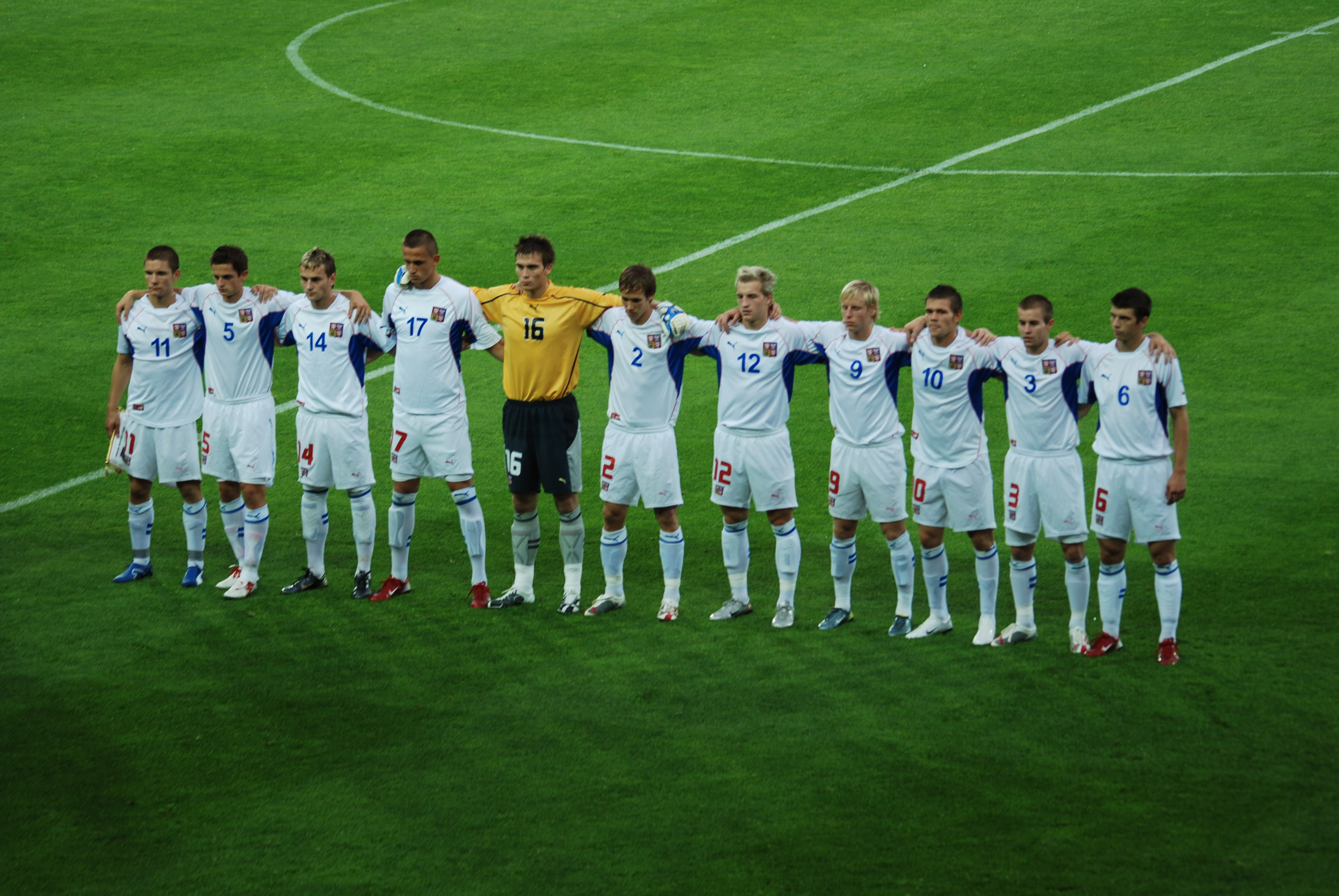
Czech U21 in 2007

#	Player	Caps
1	Jan Polák	45
2	Václav Sejk	36
3	David Kobylík	31
4	Michal Trávník	30
4	Adam Karabec	30
6	Bořek Dočkal	28
6	Josef Kaufman	28
8	Jan Lecjaks	27
8	Michal Papadopulos	27
10	Lukáš Došek	26
10	Michal Kadlec	26
10	Ondřej Mazuch	26
10	Tomáš Pekhart	26
10	Roman Týce	26
10	Tomáš Ujfaluši	26

=== Top goalscorers ===
As of 18 November 2026.

#	Player	Goals	Clubs during the player's time in the Under-21s.
1	Tomáš Pekhart	17	Tottenham Hotspur, Jablonec
2	Václav Sejk	13	Sparta Prague, Teplice, Jablonec, Roda Kerkrade, Zagłębie Lubin, Famalicão
3	Jan Chramosta	12	Mladá Boleslav
3	Daniel Fila	12	Mladá Boleslav, Slavia Prague, Teplice, Venezia
5	Patrik Schick	11	Bohemians 1905, Sampdoria
6	Milan Baroš	9	Baník Ostrava, Liverpool
6	Tomáš Došek	9	Viktoria Plzeň, Slavia Prague
6	Václav Černý	9	Ajax
9	Bořek Dočkal	8	Slavia Prague, Kladno, Slovan Liberec, Konyaspor
9	Pavel Novotný	8	Slavia Prague
9	Václav Svěrkoš	8	Baník Ostrava, Borussia Mönchengladbach, Hertha

== See also ==
- Czech Republic national football team
- Czech Republic national under-19 football team
- Czech Republic national under-18 football team
- Czech Republic national under-17 football team
