= Nikolas Koutsakos =

Cypriot footballer (born 2003)

Personal information
- Date of birth: 14 November 2003 (age 23)
- Place of birth: Nicosia, Cyprus
- Height: 1.80 m (5 ft 11 in)
- Position: Forward

Team information
- Current team: Start
- Number: 9

Youth career
- APOEL

Senior career*
Years	Team	Apps	(Gls)
2020–2026	APOEL	42	(10)
2022	→ PO Xylotymbou (loan)	17	(8)
2023	→ Ethnikos Achna (loan)	10	(0)
2023–2024	→ Achyronas Liopetriou (loan)	27	(8)
2024–2025	→ Omonia Aradippou (loan)	28	(5)
2026–	Start	2	(0)

International career^{‡}
2021	Cyprus U19		
2022–2024	Cyprus U21		
2025–	Cyprus	9	(1)
- * Club domestic league appearances and goals as of 10 September 2026 ‡ National team caps and goals as of 10 September 2026

Nikolas Koutsakos (Νικόλας Κούτσακος; born 14 November 2003) is a Cypriot footballer who plays as a forward for IK Start.

== Club career ==
Koutsakos ventured through the academy of APOEL. In August 2020 he signed a professional contract lasting three years. His first goals came in the 2020–21 Cypriot First Division, which was even a hat-trick, against Karmiotissa.

Koutsakos went on a string of loans to clubs in the second tier—PO Xylotymbou, Ethnikos Achna and Achyronas Liopetriou—before experiencing somewhat of a breakthrough in the First Division during his loan to Omonia Aradippou.

In June 2026 he extended his APOEL contract to 2029. In the summer, then, he was sold for 3 or 4 million kr to Norwegian club IK Start, in an effort to save the club from being relegated from the 2026 Eliteserien.

== International career ==
He was capped for Cyprus U19 and U21 before making his senior debut for Cyprus in June 2026 against Bulgaria. Koutsakos even scored in that match.
