= 2025 UEFA European Under-21 Championship qualification Group A =

Football tournament

Group A of the 2025 UEFA European Under-21 Championship qualifying competition consists of six teams: Italy, Ireland, Norway, Turkey, Latvia, and San Marino. The composition of the nine groups in the qualifying group stage was decided by the draw held on 2 February 2023 at the UEFA headquarters in Nyon, Switzerland, with the teams seeded according to their coefficient ranking.

== Standings ==
Pos	Team	Pld	W	D	L	GF	GA	GD	Pts	Qualification	Italy	Norway	Ireland	Turkey	Latvia	San Marino
1	Italy	10	6	4	0	27	4	+23	22	Final tournament	—	2–0	1–1	1–1	2–0	7–0
2	Norway	10	6	1	3	28	11	+17	19 (Note: Head-to-head points: Norway 4, Republic of Ireland 1.)	Play-offs	0–3	—	3–2	5–1	7–0	4–0
3	Republic of Ireland	10	5	4	1	24	12	+12	19		2–2	1–1	—	3–2	2–2	3–0
4	Turkey	10	4	1	5	21	15	+6	13		0–2	2–0	0–1	—	3–0	5–0
5	Latvia	10	3	2	5	10	18	−8	11		0–0	0–1	1–2	2–1	—	2–0
6	San Marino	10	0	0	10	1	51	−50	0		0–7	0–7	0–7	1–6	0–3	—

Source: UEFA
Rules for classification: Tiebreakers

== Matches ==
Times are CET/CEST, (Note: CEST (UTC+2) for dates between 26 March and 29 October 2023 and between 31 March and 27 October 2024, and CET (UTC+1) for all other dates.) as listed by UEFA (local times, if different, are in parentheses).

20 June 2023
17:00 (18:00 EEST)

Latvia	2–0	San Marino
Šits 38'; Melnis 86'	Report

Sloka Stadium, Jūrmala
Attendance: 300
Referee: Helgi Mikael Jónasson (Iceland)

7 September 2023
18:00

San Marino	0–7	Norway
	Report	Schjelderup 35', 45+2', 83'; Mannsverk 37'; Hansen-Aarøen 45'; Karlsbakk 88'; Edh 90+4'

San Marino Stadium, Serravalle
Attendance: 284
Referee: Mervan Bejtullahu (Kosovo)
8 September 2023
16:00 (17:00 EEST)

Latvia	0–0	Italy
	Report

Sloka Stadium, Jūrmala
Attendance: 348
Referee: Snir Levy (Israel)
8 September 2023
20:30 (19:30 BST)

Republic of Ireland	3–2	Turkey
Moran 56'; Gilsenan 87' (pen.); Emakhu 90+6'	Report	Yıldız 22' (pen.); Çanak 76'

Turners Cross, Cork
Attendance: 3,754
Referee: Joonas Jaanovits (Estonia)

12 September 2023
18:00

Norway	7–0	Latvia
Arnstad 12', 45+1', 52' (pen.); Bobb 62'; Schjelderup 67'; Gulliksen 83'; Mvuka 90'	Report

Marienlyst Stadion, Drammen
Attendance: 580
Referee: Roman Jitari (Moldova)
12 September 2023
18:45 (19:45 TRT)

Turkey	0–2	Italy
	Report	Miretti 45+2'; Nasti 79'

Sakarya Atatürk Stadium, Adapazarı
Attendance: 2,358
Referee: Pierre Gaillouste (France)
12 September 2023
20:30 (19:30 BST)

Republic of Ireland	3–0	San Marino
Vata 8', 45+2'; Matteoni 66' (o.g.)	Report

Turners Cross, Cork
Attendance: 3,826
Referee: Antoine Paul Chiaramonti (Andorra)

13 October 2023
14:00 (15:00 EEST)

Latvia	1–2	Republic of Ireland
Vapne 90+2'	Report	Oko-Flex 15', 57'

Zemgale Olympic Center, Jelgava
Attendance: 274
Referee: Oliver Reitala (Finland)
13 October 2023
18:45 (19:45 TRT)

Turkey	5–0	San Marino
Destan 5', 37'; Yardımcı 80', 82', 87'	Report

Ümraniye Stadyumu, Istanbul
Attendance: 472
Referee: Viktor Shimusik (Belarus)

17 October 2023
14:00 (15:00 EEST)

Latvia	2–1	Turkey
Vapne 25'; Melnis 79'	Report	Yardımcı 14'

Zemgale Olympic Center, Jelgava
Attendance: 237
Referee: Tim Marshall (Northern Ireland)
17 October 2023
17:45

Italy	2–0	Norway
Baldanzi 25'; Esposito 46'	Report

Stadio Druso, Bolzano
Attendance: 4,627
Referee: Jonathan Lardot (Belgium)

16 November 2023
18:30

San Marino	0–7	Italy
	Report	Pirola 5'; Gnonto 30', 39'; Volpato 46'; Fabbian 53'; Esposito 62' (pen.); Bianco 83'

Stadio Olimpico di San Marino, Serravalle
Attendance: 1,185
Referee: Joni Hyytiä (Finland)
17 November 2023
18:00

Norway	3–2	Republic of Ireland
Opsahl 20'; Arnstad 74' (pen.); Nordås 77'	Report	Emakhu 37'; Armstrong 53'

Marienlyst Stadion, Drammen
Attendance: 566
Referee: Walter Altmann (Austria)

21 November 2023
17:45 (19:45 TRT)

Turkey	2–0	Norway
Çanak 30'; Yardımcı 64'	Report

Alanya Oba Stadium, Alanya
Attendance: 457
Referee: Denys Shurman (Ukraine)
21 November 2023
18:30 (17:30 GMT)

Republic of Ireland	2–2	Italy
Phillips 31'; Armstrong 47'	Report	Gnonto 45+1' (pen.), 90+6'

Turners Cross, Cork
Attendance: 6,157
Referee: Lionel Tschudi (Switzerland)

22 March 2024
18:00

San Marino	0–7	Republic of Ireland
	Report	Armstrong 26'; Moran 53'; Benvenuti 57' (o.g.); Vata 62', 64', 90+2'; Oko-Flex 73'

San Marino Stadium, Serravalle
Attendance: 213
Referee: Viktor Kopiievskyi (Ukraine)
22 March 2024
18:15

Italy	2–0	Latvia
Casadei 32'; Fabbian 79'	Report

Stadio Dino Manuzzi, Cesena
Attendance: 4,315
Referee: Philip Farrugia (Malta)

26 March 2024
17:00

Norway	4–0	San Marino
Hansen-Aarøen 6', 61'; Østrøm 49'; Aasgaard 89'	Report

Viking Stadion, Stavanger
Attendance: 510
Referee: Daniyar Sakhi (Kazakhstan)
26 March 2024
18:15

Italy	1–1	Turkey
Ghilardi 50'	Report	Kılıçsoy 90+1'

Stadio Paolo Mazza, Ferrara
Attendance: 3,921
Referee: Cesar Soto Grado (Spain)

5 September 2024
16:00 (17:00 EEST)

Latvia	0–1	Norway
	Report	Arnstad 54' (pen.)

Sloka Stadium, Jūrmala
Attendance: 243
Referee: Joonas Jaanovits (Estonia)
5 September 2024
16:45

Italy	7–0	San Marino
Bove 35'; Matteoni 38' (o.g.); Esposito 58', 76', 78', 90+1'; Raimondo 81'	Report

Stadio Domenico Francioni, Latina
Attendance: 3,144
Referee: Marek Radina (Czech Republic)
6 September 2024
18:45 (19:45 TRT)

Turkey	0–1	Republic of Ireland
	Report	Curtis 84'

Esenler Stadium, Istanbul
Attendance: 2,188
Referee: Amine Kourgheli (Belarus)

10 September 2024
18:00 (17:00 BST)

Republic of Ireland	2–2	Latvia
Armstrong 16'; Roughan 65'	Report	Anmanis 42'; Patrikejevs 63'

Tallaght Stadium, Dublin
Attendance: 953
Referee: Stefan Ebner (Austria)
10 September 2024
18:30

Norway	0–3	Italy
	Report	Baldanzi 10', 72', 80'

Viking Stadion, Stavanger
Attendance: 2,141
Referee: Gergő Bogár (Hungary)
10 September 2024
20:30

San Marino	1–6	Turkey
M. Ciacci 16'	Report	Elmaz 9' (pen.), 14'; Burcu 32' (pen.); Çanak 36'; İnce 45'; Ortakaya 90+1'

San Marino Stadium, Serravalle
Attendance: 283
Referee: Matthew De Gabriele (Malta)

11 October 2024
18:30

Turkey	3–0	Latvia
Yardımcı 35'; Elmaz 56'; Yıldırım 65'	Report

Atatürk Olimpiyat Stadyumu, Istanbul
Attendance: 2,453
Referee: Daniyar Sakhi (Kazakhstan)
11 October 2024
20:00

Republic of Ireland	1–1	Norway
Roughan 75'	Report	Schjelderup 90+3'

Turners Cross, Cork
Attendance: 5,754
Referee: Javier Alberola Rojas (Spain)

15 October 2024
18:30

San Marino	0–3	Latvia
	Report	Vientiess 26'; Meļķis 39', 52'

San Marino Stadium, Serravalle
Attendance: 160
Referee: Martin Matoša (Slovenia)
15 October 2024
18:30

Norway	5–1	Turkey
Arnstad 20' (pen.); Nordås 33'; Schjelderup 53', 68'; Egeli 61'	Report	Akman 90+2'

Viking Stadion, Stavanger
Attendance: 1,146
Referee: Lothar D'hondt (Belgium)
15 October 2024
18:30

Italy	1–1	Republic of Ireland
Casadei 23'	Report	Moran 66'

Stadio Nereo Rocco, Trieste
Attendance: 1,730
Referee: Adam Ladebäck (Sweden)

== Goalscorers ==
There have been 111 goals scored in 30 matches, for an average of 3.7 goals per match.

6 goals

- (Italy) Francesco Pio Esposito
- (Norway) Kristian Arnstad
- (Norway) Andreas Schjelderup
- (Turkey) Erencan Yardımcı

5 goals

- (Republic of Ireland) Rocco Vata

4 goals

- (Italy) Tommaso Baldanzi
- (Italy) Wilfried Gnonto
- (Republic of Ireland) Sinclair Armstrong

3 goals

- (Norway) Isak Hansen-Aarøen
- (Republic of Ireland) Andrew Moran
- (Republic of Ireland) Armstrong Oko-Flex
- (Turkey) Cihan Çanak
- (Turkey) Bartuğ Elmaz

2 goals

- (Italy) Cesare Casadei
- (Italy) Giovanni Fabbian
- (Latvia) Bruno Melnis
- (Latvia) Lūkass Vapne
- (Norway) Lasse Selvåg Nordås
- (Republic of Ireland) Aidomo Emakhu
- (Republic of Ireland) Sean Roughan
- (Turkey) Enis Destan

1 goal

- (Italy) Alessandro Bianco
- (Italy) Edoardo Bove
- (Italy) Daniele Ghilardi
- (Italy) Fabio Miretti
- (Italy) Marco Nasti
- (Italy) Lorenzo Pirola
- (Italy) Cristian Volpato
- (Italy) Antonio Raimondo
- (Latvia) Kaspars Anmanis
- (Latvia) Roberts Meļķis
- (Latvia) Ivans Patrikejevs
- (Latvia) Dario Šits
- (Latvia) Oskars Vientiess
- (Norway) Thelo Aasgaard
- (Norway) Oscar Bobb
- (Norway) Eskil Edh
- (Norway) Sindre Walle Egeli
- (Norway) Tobias Fjeld Gulliksen
- (Norway) Daniel Karlsbakk
- (Norway) Sivert Mannsverk
- (Norway) Joel Mvuka
- (Norway) Halvor Rødølen Opsahl
- (Norway) Robin Østrøm
- (Republic of Ireland) Sam Curtis
- (Republic of Ireland) Zak Gilsenan
- (Republic of Ireland) Killian Phillips
- (San Marino) Mattia Ciacci
- (Turkey) Ali Akman
- (Turkey) Livan Burcu
- (Turkey) Burak İnce
- (Turkey) Semih Kılıçsoy
- (Turkey) Emir Ortakaya
- (Turkey) Poyraz Efe Yıldırım
- (Turkey) Kenan Yıldız

1 own goal

- (San Marino) Giacomo Benvenuti (against Republic of Ireland)

2 own goals

- (San Marino) Giacomo Matteoni (against Italy and Republic of Ireland)
