= 2025 UEFA European Under-21 Championship qualification Group F =

Association football qualifying group

Group F of the 2025 UEFA European Under-21 Championship qualifying competition consists of six teams: England, Ukraine, Serbia, Northern Ireland, Azerbaijan, and Luxembourg. The composition of the nine groups in the qualifying group stage was decided by the draw held on 2 February 2023 at the UEFA headquarters in Nyon, Switzerland, with the teams seeded according to their coefficient ranking.

== Standings ==
Pos	Team	Pld	W	D	L	GF	GA	GD	Pts	Qualification	England	Ukraine	Serbia		Luxembourg	Azerbaijan
1	England	10	8	1	1	41	6	+35	25	Final tournament	—	2–1	9–1	3–0	7–0	7–0
2	Ukraine	10	8	0	2	20	7	+13	24	Final tournament	3–2	—	2–1	1–0	4–0	1–0
3	Serbia	10	5	1	4	13	18	−5	16		0–3	1–0	—	1–2	2–0	2–0
4	Northern Ireland	10	3	2	5	10	10	0	11		0–0	1–2	1–2	—	0–1	5–0
5	Luxembourg	10	2	2	6	6	23	−17	8		0–3	0–3	1–1	0–0	—	2–0
6	Azerbaijan	10	1	0	9	4	30	−26	3		1–5	0–3	0–2	0–1	3–2	—

Source: UEFA
Rules for classification: Tiebreakers

== Matches ==
Times are CET/CEST, (Note: CEST (UTC+2) for dates between 26 March and 29 October 2023 and between 31 March and 27 October 2024, and CET (UTC+1) for all other dates.) as listed by UEFA (local times, if different, are in parentheses).

7 September 2023
15:00 (14:00 BST)

Northern Ireland	0–1	Luxembourg
	Report	Rodrigues 13'

Mourneview Park, Lurgan
Attendance: 333
Referee: Andreas Argyrou (Cyprus)

11 September 2023
18:00

Luxembourg	0–3	England
	Report	Delap 43'; Doyle 58'; Palmer 67'

Stade Municipal de la Ville de Differdange, Differdange
Attendance: 1,405
Referee: Miloš Savović (Montenegro)

12 September 2023
18:30

Ukraine	1–0	Northern Ireland
Roman 70'	Report

NTC Poprad, Poprad (Slovakia)
Attendance: 275
Referee: Kai Erik Steen (Norway)
12 September 2023
20:00

Serbia	2–0	Azerbaijan
Ilić 19', 26'	Report

Sportski centar FSS, Stara Pazova
Attendance: 412
Referee: Erkan Özdamar (Turkey)

12 October 2023
16:00 (18:00 AZT)

Azerbaijan	0–1	Northern Ireland
	Report	McGuckin 19'

Azersun Arena, Baku
Attendance: 300
Referee: Georgi Davidov (Bulgaria)
12 October 2023
19:30

Luxembourg	0–3	Ukraine
	Report	Krasnopir 45'; Vyunnyk 69'; Kvasnytsya 90+4'

Stade Émile Mayrisch, Esch-sur-Alzette
Attendance: 661
Referee: Vilhjálmur Alvar Þórarinsson (Iceland)
12 October 2023
20:45 (19:45 BST)

England	9–1	Serbia
Philogene 38', 63'; Delap 42'; Elliott 45+7', 90+1'; Madueke 53', 59'; Subotić 87' (o.g.); Rowe 89'	Report	Lučić 27'

City Ground, West Bridgford
Attendance: 14,753
Referee: Sven Jablonski (Germany)

16 October 2023
18:30

Ukraine	3–2	England
Voloshyn 31'; Ocheretko 43'; Kvasnytsia 90+4'	Report	Madueke 67'; Cresswell 89'

Košická futbalová aréna, Košice (Slovakia)
Attendance: 3,245
Referee: Gustavo Correia (Portugal)
16 October 2023
20:30 (19:30 BST)

Northern Ireland	1–2	Serbia
McGuckin 51' (pen.)	Report	Lučić 15'; Pantović 82'

Mourneview Park, Lurgan
Attendance: 433
Referee: Kristoffer Hagenes (Norway)
17 October 2023
16:00 (18:00 AZT)

Azerbaijan	3–2	Luxembourg
Akhundzade 41' (pen.); Torres 88' (o.g.); Salyanskiy 90+1'	Report	Berberi 45+4'; Elshan 54'

Azersun Arena, Baku
Attendance: 200
Referee: Dumitri Muntean (Moldova)

17 November 2023
19:00

Ukraine	4–0	Luxembourg
Vanat 35'; Batahov 64'; Voloshyn 66'; Krasnopir 74'	Report

Estadio Nueva Condomina, Murcia (Spain)
Attendance: 1,026
Referee: Sandi Putros (Denmark)
18 November 2023
17:00

Serbia	0–3	England
	Report	McAtee 5', 19'; Elliott 55'

TSC Arena, Bačka Topola
Attendance: 1,200
Referee: Peter Kjærsgaard (Denmark)

21 November 2023
19:00

Serbia	2–0	Luxembourg
Ratkov 13'; Lučić 30'	Report

Sportski centar FSS, Stara Pazova
Attendance: 300
Referee: Sigurd Kringstad (Norway)
21 November 2023
19:00

Ukraine	1–0	Azerbaijan
Brazhko 34' (pen.)	Report

Estadio Nueva Condomina, Murcia (Spain)
Attendance: 880
Referee: Irakli Kvirikashvili (Georgia)
21 November 2023
20:45 (19:45 GMT)

England	3–0	Northern Ireland
Morton 31'; Elliott 52', 80'	Report

Goodison Park, Liverpool
Attendance: 7,890
Referee: Lothar D'hondt (Belgium)

22 March 2024
13:00 (16:00 AZT)

Azerbaijan	1–5	England
Nasirli 86'	Report	Elliott 25', 67'; Madueke 29'; Philogene 53'; Gray 88'

Azersun Arena, Baku
Attendance: 500
Referee: Antoni Bandić (Bosnia and Herzegovina)
22 March 2024
19:30

Luxembourg	1–1	Serbia
Goncalves 51'	Report	Mitrović 4'

Stade Émile Mayrisch, Esch-sur-Alzette
Attendance: 973
Referee: Chrysovalantis Theouli (Cyprus)

26 March 2024
13:00 (16:00 AZT)

Azerbaijan	0–3	Ukraine
	Report	Yatsyk 25'; Ocheretko 40'; Rubchynskyi 56'

Azersun Arena, Baku
Attendance: 250
Referee: Dario Bel (Croatia)
26 March 2024
18:00

Serbia	1–2	Northern Ireland
Mitrović 39'	Report	Allen 56'; Farquhar 70'

Dubočica Stadium, Leskovac
Attendance: 2,958
Referee: Yigal Frid (Israel)
26 March 2024
20:00 (19:00 GMT)

England	7–0	Luxembourg
Madueke 23', 55'; Iling-Junior 41', 72'; Bynoe-Gittens 51'; Rogers 62', 82'	Report

Toughsheet Community Stadium, Bolton
Attendance: 11,620
Referee: Jasper Vergoote (Belgium)

6 September 2024
18:00 (19:00 EEST)

Ukraine	2–1	Serbia
Voloshyn 34'; Yarmolyuk 58' (pen.)	Report	Baždar 7'

LNK Sporta Parks, Riga (Latvia)
Attendance: 424
Referee: Simone Sozza (Italy)
6 September 2024
19:30

Luxembourg	2–0	Azerbaijan
Elshan 21', 45+2' (pen.)	Report

Stade Émile Mayrisch, Esch-sur-Alzette
Attendance: 256
Referee: Désirée Grundbacher (Switzerland)
6 September 2024
20:45 (19:45 BST)

Northern Ireland	0–0	England
	Report

The Showgrounds, Ballymena
Attendance: 3,237
Referee: David Šmajc (Slovenia)

10 September 2024
17:00 (19:00 AZT)

Azerbaijan	0–2	Serbia
	Report	Đurđević 19'; Mijatović 26'

Dalga Arena, Baku
Attendance: 180
Referee: Bastien Dechepy (France)
10 September 2024
20:45 (19:45 BST)

Northern Ireland	1–2	Ukraine
Allen 81' (pen.)	Report	Voloshyn 10'; Braharu 30'

The Showgrounds, Ballymena
Attendance: 697
Referee: Oliver Reitala (Finland)

11 October 2024
20:45

England	2–1	Ukraine
McAtee 88', 90+2'	Report	Mykhavko 70'

Dean Court, Bournemouth
Attendance: 9,858
Referee: Joakim Östling (Sweden)
12 October 2024
16:00 (15:00 BST)

Northern Ireland	5–0	Azerbaijan
Allen 11' (pen.); McKiernan 56'; Kelly 64'; Devenny 68'; Samigullin 81' (o.g.)	Report

The Showgrounds, Ballymena
Attendance: 440
Referee: Heini Ziskason Viðoy (Faroe Islands)

15 October 2024
20:30

Serbia	1–0	Ukraine
Aleksić 21'	Report

Sportski centar FSS, Stara Pazova
Attendance: 214
Referee: Robert Ian Jenkins (Wales)
15 October 2024
20:30 (19:30 BST)

England	7–0	Azerbaijan
Cresswell 2'; Doyle 27'; McAtee 55'; Hüseynov 70' (o.g.); Anderson 72'; Scarlett 86'; Hutchinson 90'	Report

Ashton Gate Stadium, Bristol
Attendance: 14,974
Referee: Ivana Martinčić (Croatia)
15 October 2024
20:30

Luxembourg	0–0	Northern Ireland
	Report

Stade Émile Mayrisch, Esch-sur-Alzette
Attendance: 257
Referee: Visar Kastrati (Kosovo)

== Goalscorers ==
There have been 94 goals scored in 30 matches, for an average of 3.13 goals per match (as of 16 October 2024).

7 goals

- (England) Harvey Elliott

6 goals

- (England) Noni Madueke

5 goals

- (England) James McAtee

4 goals

- (Ukraine) Nazar Voloshyn

3 goals

- (England) Jaden Philogene
- (Luxembourg) Leon Elshan
- (Northern Ireland) Charlie Allen
- (Serbia) Vladimir Lučić

2 goals

- (England) Charlie Cresswell
- (England) Liam Delap
- (England) Callum Doyle
- (England) Samuel Iling-Junior
- (England) Morgan Rogers
- (Northern Ireland) Ciaran McGuckin
- (Serbia) Mihajlo Ilić
- (Serbia) Stefan Mitrović
- (Ukraine) Ihor Krasnopir
- (Ukraine) Illya Kvasnytsya
- (Ukraine) Oleh Ocheretko

1 goal

- (Azerbaijan) Nariman Akhundzade
- (Azerbaijan) Ramin Nasirli
- (Azerbaijan) Agadadas Salyanskiy
- (England) Elliot Anderson
- (England) Jamie Bynoe-Gittens
- (England) Archie Gray
- (England) Omari Hutchinson
- (England) Tyler Morton
- (England) Cole Palmer
- (England) Jonathan Rowe
- (England) Dane Scarlett
- (Luxembourg) Rayan Berberi
- (Luxembourg) Miguel Fernandes Goncalves
- (Luxembourg) James Alves Rodrigues
- (Northern Ireland) Justin Devenny
- (Northern Ireland) Craig Farquhar
- (Northern Ireland) Patrick Kelly
- (Northern Ireland) JJ McKiernan
- (Serbia) Samed Baždar
- (Serbia) Milan Aleksić
- (Serbia) Vukašin Đurđević
- (Serbia) Jovan Mijatović
- (Serbia) Miloš Pantović
- (Serbia) Petar Ratkov
- (Ukraine) Arseniy Batahov
- (Ukraine) Maksym Braharu
- (Ukraine) Volodymyr Brazhko
- (Ukraine) Taras Mykhavko
- (Ukraine) Vitaliy Roman
- (Ukraine) Valentyn Rubchynskyi
- (Ukraine) Vladyslav Vanat
- (Ukraine) Bohdan Vyunnyk
- (Ukraine) Yehor Yarmolyuk
- (Ukraine) Oleksandr Yatsyk

1 own goal

- (Azerbaijan) Cəlal Hüseynov (against England)
- (Azerbaijan) Rustam Samigullin (against Northern Ireland)
- (Luxembourg) Yohann Torres (against Azerbaijan)
- (Serbia) Luka Subotić (against England)
