= Matthew Ellul =

Maltese footballer

Personal information
- Full name: Mathhew Elull
- Date of birth: 23 May 2002 (age 24)
- Position: Defender

Team information
- Current team: Hibernians
- Number: 5

Youth career
- 2018–2019: Hibernians

Senior career*
Years	Team	Apps	(Gls)
2019–	Hibernians	18	(1)

International career^{‡}
2018–2018	Malta U16		
2018–2018	Malta U17		
2018–2019	Malta U19		
2019–2024	Malta U21		
- * Club domestic league appearances and goals as of 16 June 2023, 14:07 (CEST) ‡ National team caps and goals as of 16 June 2023, 14:20 (CEST)

Matthew Ellul (born 23 May 2002) is a Maltese professional footballer who plays as a defender for Hibernians.

== Club career ==
Ellul started his youth career at the Hibernians academy when he was 16. He made his senior debut in July 2019. While at Hibernians he played in the Maltese Premier League and scored 1 goal there through his career. Ellul also played in Europe. He played in the Champions League qualifying in the 2021-22 season and the 2022-23 season. In the Europa League qualifying at the 2019-20 season and the 2020-21 season

== International career ==
Ellul made his international debut with Malta Under 16 national team at 24 April 2018 against the Andorra Under 16 national team. Ellul played a total of 249 mins (4 hrs 9 mins) with the Malta Under 16 team. Ellul made his debut at Malta under 17 national team at a match against North Macedonia under 17 national team played at 24 August 2018, Ellul played a total of 218 mins (3 hrs 38 mins) with the under-17 team. Ellul made his debut with Malta under 19 national team against Italy Under 19 national team. Ellul hasn't played any minutes with the Under-19 team because of being in the bench all matches. Ellul made his debut for the Malta Under 21 national team at a match played 4 September 2019 against Northern Ireland Under 21 national team. Ellul still plays for Malta Under 21 national team but has currently played a total of 899 minutes (14 hrs 59 mins) for the national team.

== Career statistics ==
=== club ===
Statistics accurate as of match played 21 April 2023.

Appearances and goals by club, season and competition
Club	Season	League			Maltese Cup		Europe		Other		Total	
Club	Season	Division	Apps	Goals	Apps	Goals	Apps	Goals	Apps	Goals	Apps	Goals
Hibernians	2019-20	Maltese Premier League	1	0	0	0	0	0	0	0	1	0
Hibernians	2020-21	Maltese Premier League	7	0	0	0	0	0	0	0	7	0
Hibernians	2021-22	Maltese Premier League	6	0	0	0	0	0	0	0	6	0
Hibernians	2022-23	Maltese Premier League	2	1	0	0	0	0	0	0	2	1
Career total			16	1	0	0	0	0	0	0	16	1

== Honours ==
- Maltese Premier League: 2021-22

== See also ==
- Hibernians F.C.
- Malta national under-17 football team
- Malta national under-19 football team
- Malta national under-21 football team
