= 2025 UEFA European Under-21 Championship qualification Group I =

Football tournament group stage

Group I of the 2025 UEFA European Under-21 Championship qualifying competition consists of five teams: Denmark, Czech Republic, Iceland, Wales, and Lithuania. The composition of the nine groups in the qualifying group stage was decided by the draw held on 2 February 2023 at the UEFA headquarters in Nyon, Switzerland, with the teams seeded according to their coefficient ranking.

== Standings ==
Pos	Team	Pld	W	D	L	GF	GA	GD	Pts	Qualification	Denmark	Czech Republic	Wales	Iceland	Lithuania
1	Denmark	8	5	2	1	18	8	+10	17	Final tournament	—	5–0	2–2	2–0	3–0
2	Czech Republic	8	4	2	2	13	11	+2	14 (Note: Head-to-head points: Czech Republic 4, Wales 1)	Play-offs	0–0	—	1–1	4–1	3–0
3	Wales	8	4	2	2	13	11	+2	14		1–2	1–2	—	1–0	2–1
4	Iceland	8	3	0	5	9	14	−5	9		4–2	2–1	1–2	—	0–2
5	Lithuania	8	1	0	7	7	16	−9	3		1–2	1–2	2–3	0–1	—

Source: UEFA
Rules for classification: Tiebreakers

== Matches ==
Times are CET/CEST, (Note: CEST (UTC+2) for dates between 26 March and 29 October 2023 and between 31 March and 27 October 2024, and CET (UTC+1) for all other dates.) as listed by UEFA (local times, if different, are in parentheses).

16 June 2023
17:00 (18:00 EEST)

Lithuania	1–2	Denmark
Kučys 19'	Report	Kjærgaard 9'; Hansen 11'

Jonava Stadium, Jonava
Attendance: 357
Referee: Henrik Nalbandyan (Armenia)

20 June 2023
18:00

Denmark	2–2	Wales
Kjærgaard 39' (pen.); Provstgaard 73'	Report	Colwill 48' (pen.), 60' (pen.)

Vejle Stadium, Vejle
Attendance: 2,260
Referee: Ante Čulina (Croatia)

12 September 2023
17:00 (18:00 EEST)

Lithuania	2–3	Wales
Steponavičius 90+1'; Keršys 90+2'	Report	Harris 34'; Stevens 46'; Cotterill 83'

Jonava Stadium, Jonava
Attendance: 267
Referee: Rauf Jabarov (Azerbaijan)
12 September 2023
18:30 (16:30 WET)

Iceland	2–1	Czech Republic
Guðjohnsen 44'; Baldursson 90+4'	Report	Kabongo 87'

Víkingsvöllur, Reykjavík
Attendance: 504
Referee: Jovan Kachevski (North Macedonia)

13 October 2023
18:00

Czech Republic	1–1	Wales
M. Jurásek 38'	Report	Ashford 90+6'

Stadion Střelecký ostrov, České Budějovice
Attendance: 4,011
Referee: Zaven Hovhannisyan (Armenia)

17 October 2023
17:00 (18:00 EEST)

Lithuania	0–1	Iceland
	Report	Jóhannsson 66'

Jonava Stadium, Jonava
Attendance: 110
Referee: Luis Teixeira (Andorra)
17 October 2023
18:00

Czech Republic	0–0	Denmark
	Report

Stadion Střelecký ostrov, České Budějovice
Attendance: 4,263
Referee: Jasmin Sabotic (Luxembourg)

16 November 2023
19:00 (18:00 GMT)

Wales	1–0	Iceland
Low 28'	Report

Rodney Parade, Newport
Attendance: 742
Referee: Antoni Bandić (Bosnia and Herzegovina)

20 November 2023
19:00 (18:00 GMT)

Wales	1–2	Denmark
Ashford 90+4'	Report	Bech 5'; Provstgaard 89'

Rodney Parade, Newport
Attendance: 1,094
Referee: José Luis Munuera Montero (Spain)

22 March 2024
19:00 (18:00 GMT)

Wales	2–1	Lithuania
Colwill 15'; Koumas 76'	Report	Burba 11'

Rodney Parade, Newport
Attendance: 1,311
Referee: Kristoffer Hagenes (Norway)

26 March 2024
17:30

Czech Republic	4–1	Iceland
Sejk 13'; Fila 20', 70'; Kabongo 51'	Report	Ingason 79' (pen.)

Všesportovní stadion, Hradec Králové
Attendance: 9,126
Referee: Radoslav Gidzhenov (Bulgaria)
26 March 2024
18:00

Denmark	3–0	Lithuania
Osula 7'; Sørensen 43', 56' (pen.)	Report

Vejle Stadium, Vejle
Attendance: 1,581
Referee: Donald Robertson (Scotland)

6 September 2024
14:30 (15:30 EEST)

Lithuania	1–2	Czech Republic
Jansonas 19'	Report	Alijagić 58'; Sejk 87'

Jonava Stadium, Jonava
Attendance: 328
Referee: Miloš Milanović (Serbia)
6 September 2024
17:00 (15:00 WET)

Iceland	4–2	Denmark
Ingason 28', 73' (pen.), 75'; Sigurpálsson 40'	Report	Osula 16'; Kvistgaarden 52'

Víkingsvöllur, Reykjavík
Attendance: 305
Referee: Oleksii Derevinskyi (Ukraine)

10 September 2024
17:30 (15:30 WET)

Iceland	1–2	Wales
Borgþórsson 90+3'	Report	Cotterill 47', 72'

Víkingsvöllur, Reykjavík
Attendance: 265
Referee: Miguel Nogueira (Portugal)
10 September 2024
18:00

Denmark	5–0	Czech Republic
Bøving 28'; Biereth 48'; Sørensen 54' (pen.); Kristensen 61'; Kvistgaarden 87'	Report

Vejle Stadium, Vejle
Attendance: 2,595
Referee: Alessandro Dudic (Switzerland)

10 October 2024
17:00 (15:00 WET)

Iceland	0–2	Lithuania
	Report	Steponavičius 16'; Jansonas 31'

Víkingsvöllur, Reykjavík
Attendance: 262
Referee: Dumitri Muntean (Moldova)

11 October 2024
18:30 (17:30 BST)

Wales	1–2	Czech Republic
Hoole 90+4'	Report	Baker 27' (o.g.); Sejk 50'

Rodney Parade, Newport
Attendance: 2,386
Referee: Walter Altmann (Austria)

15 October 2024
18:00

Czech Republic	3–0	Lithuania
Daněk 53'; Jurásek 55'; Sejk 72'	Report

Všesportovní stadion, Hradec Králové
Attendance: 8,915
Referee: Trustin Farrugia Cann (Malta)
15 October 2024
18:00

Denmark	2–0	Iceland
Chukwuani 32'; Kvistgaarden 59'	Report

Vejle Stadium, Vejle
Attendance: 3,386
Referee: Snir Levy (Israel)

== Goalscorers ==
There have been 60 goals scored in 20 matches, for an average of 3 goals per match.

4 goals

- (Czech Republic) Václav Sejk
- (Iceland) Kristall Máni Ingason

3 goals

- (Denmark) Mathias Kvistgaarden
- (Denmark) Oliver Sørensen
- (Wales) Rubin Colwill
- (Wales) Joel Cotterill

2 goals

- (Czech Republic) Daniel Fila
- (Czech Republic) Matěj Jurásek
- (Czech Republic) Christophe Kabongo
- (Denmark) Maurits Kjærgaard
- (Denmark) William Osula
- (Denmark) Oliver Provstgaard
- (Lithuania) Romualdas Jansonas
- (Lithuania) Faustas Steponavičius
- (Wales) Cian Ashford

1 goal

- (Czech Republic) Denis Alijagić
- (Czech Republic) Kryštof Daněk
- (Denmark) Tobias Bech
- (Denmark) Mika Biereth
- (Denmark) William Bøving
- (Denmark) Tochi Chukwuani
- (Denmark) Mads Hansen
- (Denmark) Thomas Kristensen
- (Iceland) Andri Baldursson
- (Iceland) Óskar Borgþórsson
- (Iceland) Andri Guðjohnsen
- (Iceland) Davíð Snær Jóhannsson
- (Iceland) Ari Sigurpálsson
- (Lithuania) Motiejus Burba
- (Lithuania) Kristupas Keršys
- (Lithuania) Armandas Kučys
- (Wales) Luke Harris
- (Wales) Luca Hoole
- (Wales) Lewis Koumas
- (Wales) Joe Low
- (Wales) Fin Stevens

1 own goal

- (Wales) Matt Baker (against Czech Republic)
