= Stavros Gavriil =

Cypriot footballer (born 2002)

Personal information
- Date of birth: 29 January 2002 (age 24)
- Place of birth: Nicosia, Cyprus
- Height: 1.78 m (5 ft 10 in)
- Position: Winger

Team information
- Current team: Nacional
- Number: 11

Youth career
- 2012–2020: APOEL

Senior career*
Years	Team	Apps	(Gls)
2020–2024	APOEL	33	(4)
2022–2023	→ Akritas Chlorakas (loan)	32	(5)
2024–2026	Zulte Waregem	59	(9)
2026–	Nacional	2	(0)

International career^{‡}
2018	Cyprus U17	3	(0)
2020	Cyprus U19	2	(0)
2020–	Cyprus U21	13	(3)
2023–	Cyprus	3	(0)
- * Club domestic league appearances and goals as of 16 August 2026 ‡ National team caps and goals as of 1 December 2024

Stavros Gavriil (Greek: Σταύρος Γαβριήλ; born 29 January 2002) is a Cypriot professional footballer who plays as a winger for Portuguese club Nacional and the Cyprus national team.

== Club career ==
Gavriil made his professional debut for APOEL in the Cypriot First Division on 25 November 2020, in a 2–0 home win over Doxa. he scored his first goal for APOEL in a 1–0 win against E.N.P scoring the only goal of the game.

On 23 January 2024, Gavriil signed a 2.5-year contract with Zulte Waregem in Belgium.

On 3 July 2026, Gavriil moved to Nacional in Primeira Liga for three seasons.

== Career statistics ==
=== Club ===
As of 16 July 2023

Club	Season	League			Cup		Continental		Other		Total	
Club	Season	Division	Apps	Goals	Apps	Goals	Apps	Goals	Apps	Goals	Apps	Goals
APOEL	2020–21	Cypriot First Division	17	1	3	1	—		—		20	2
APOEL	2021–22	Cypriot First Division	5	1	1	0	—		—		6	1
APOEL	Total		22	2	4	1	0	0	0	0	26	3
Akritas Chlorakas (loan)	2022–23	Cypriot First Division	32	5	2	0	—		—		34	5
Career total			54	7	6	1	0	0	0	0	60	8
