= Marian Danciu =

Romanian professional footballer

Personal information
- Date of birth: 24 April 2002 (age 24)
- Place of birth: Târgu Cărbunești, Romania
- Height: 1.75 m (5 ft 9 in)
- Position: Forward

Team information
- Current team: SCM Râmnicu Vâlcea

Youth career
- 2012–2017: Pandurii Târgu Jiu
- 2017–2020: Universitatea Craiova

Senior career*
Years	Team	Apps	(Gls)
2018–2023	Universitatea II Craiova	55	(9)
2020–2025	Universitatea Craiova	36	(2)
2023	→ CSM Slatina (loan)	4	(0)
2025	UTA Arad	13	(0)
2026	Universitatea II Craiova	0	(0)
2026–	SCM Râmnicu Vâlcea	0	(0)

International career^{‡}
2019–2020	Romania U18	5	(0)
2023–2024	Romania U21	1	(1)
- * Club domestic league appearances and goals as of 5 May 2025 ‡ National team caps and goals as of 17 November 2023

Marian Danciu (born 24 April 2002), is a Romanian professional footballer who plays as forward for Liga II club SCM Râmnicu Vâlcea.
