= Andrea Zammit =

Maltese footballer (born 2003)

Personal information
- Full name: Andrea Zammit
- Date of birth: April 5, 2003 (age 23)
- Position: Forward

Team information
- Current team: Valletta F.C.
- Number: 8

Youth career
- San Ġwann

Senior career*
Years	Team	Apps	(Gls)
2020–2022	San Ġwann	30	(16)
2022–2023	Valletta	47	(9)
2023	ACR Messina	3	(0)
2024	Birkirkara	26	(3)
2025–	Valletta	39	(10)

International career^{‡}
2020–2025	Malta U21	27	(9)
2025–	Malta	8	(1)
- * Club domestic league appearances and goals as of 17 November 2025 ‡ National team caps and goals as of 20:00, 13 November 2026 (UTC)

Andrea Zammit (born 5 April 2003) is a Maltese footballer who plays as a forward for Valletta F.C. and the Malta national team.

== Club career ==
Zammit came through the San Ġwann system and broke into senior football with the club, scoring 16 goals in 30 matches in the Maltese leagues. In January 2022 he joined Valletta on a three-year deal, making 47 appearances and scoring nine goals.

In the summer of 2023 he moved to Italian Serie C side ACR Messina but rescinded his contract due to a lack of first-team opportunities in late 2023. On 9 January 2024 he signed for Birkirkara on a two-and-a-half-year contract.

Valletta reached agreement to re-sign Zammit in January 2025; his player page lists him at Valletta with a long-term contract.

== International career ==
A regular with Malta's youth national teams, Zammit scored for the U-21s in UEFA qualifying, including a late goal in a 2–0 win away to Northern Ireland in 2023. Andrea Zammit is also listed as the all-time top scorer for the Malta U21 national team having scored 9 goals for Malta U21. He was also on target in a 2024 fixture.

Zammit made his senior international debut for Malta on 14 November 2025, coming on as a substitute in a World Cup qualifier away to Finland; Malta recorded a win.

=== International ===
As of match played 4 October 2026

Appearances and goals by national team and year
National team	Year	Apps	Goals
Malta	2026	7	1
Total		7	1

Scores and results list Malta's goal tally first, score column indicates score after each Zammit goal.

List of international goals scored by Andrea Zammit
No.	Date	Venue	Opponent	Score	Result	Competition
1	27 September 2026	National Stadium, Ta' Qali, Malta	Liechtenstein	2–0	2–0	Friendly

== Personal life ==
Zammit is the son of Maltese former footballer and current Birkirkara coach Paul Zammit.
