= 2025 UEFA European Under-21 Championship =

Majstrovstvá Európy vo futbale hráčov do 21 rokov 2025
- Age Means Nothing

Tournament details
- Host country: Slovakia
- Dates: 11–28 June
- Teams: 16 (from 1 confederation)
- Venues: 8 (in 8 host cities)

Final positions
- Champions: England (4th title)
- Runners-up: Germany

Tournament statistics
- Matches played: 31
- Goals scored: 101 (3.26 per match)
- Attendance: 250,492 (8,080 per match)
- Top scorer(s): (Germany) Nick Woltemade (6 goals)
- Best player: (England) Harvey Elliott

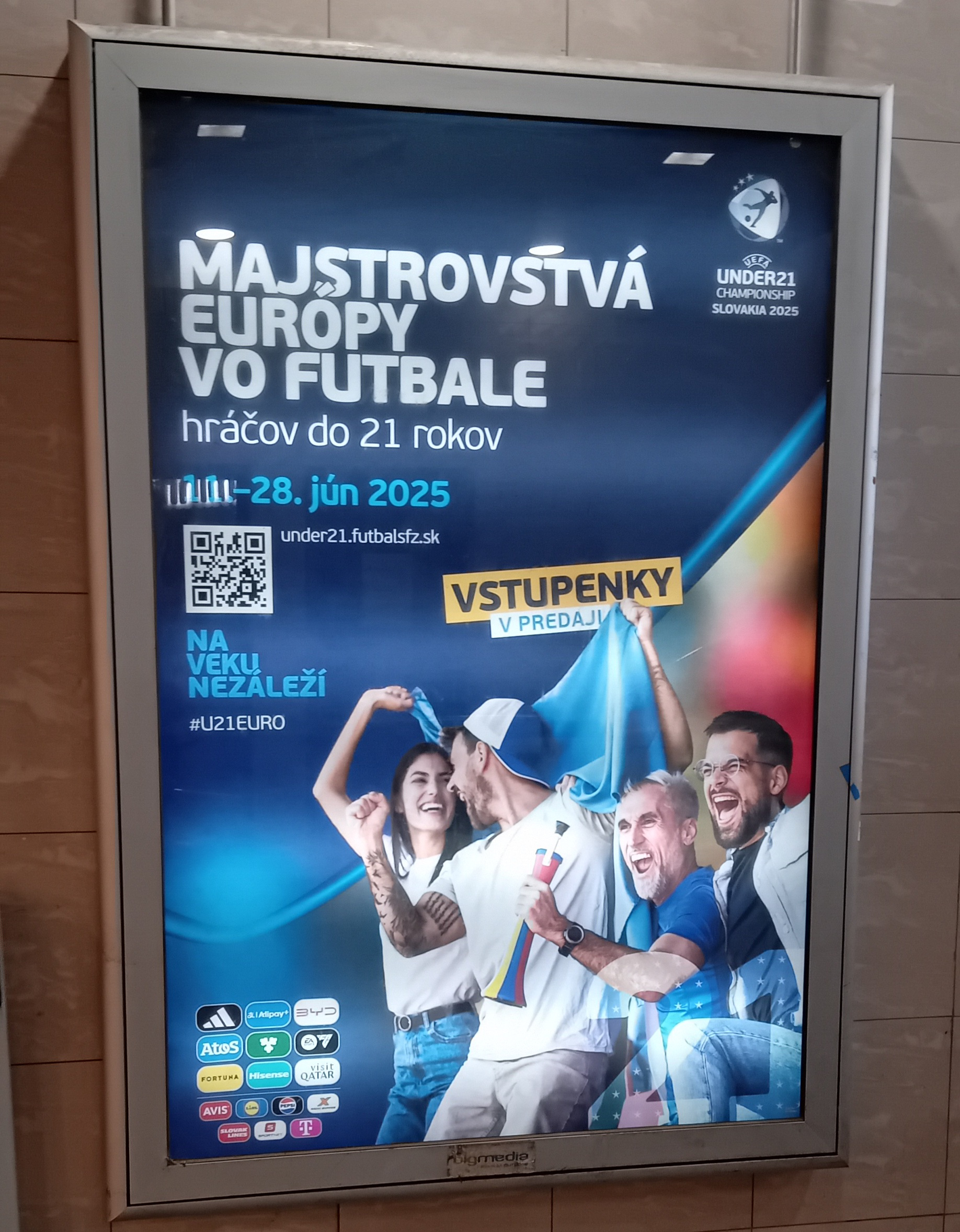
Event venue advertising panel in Slovak

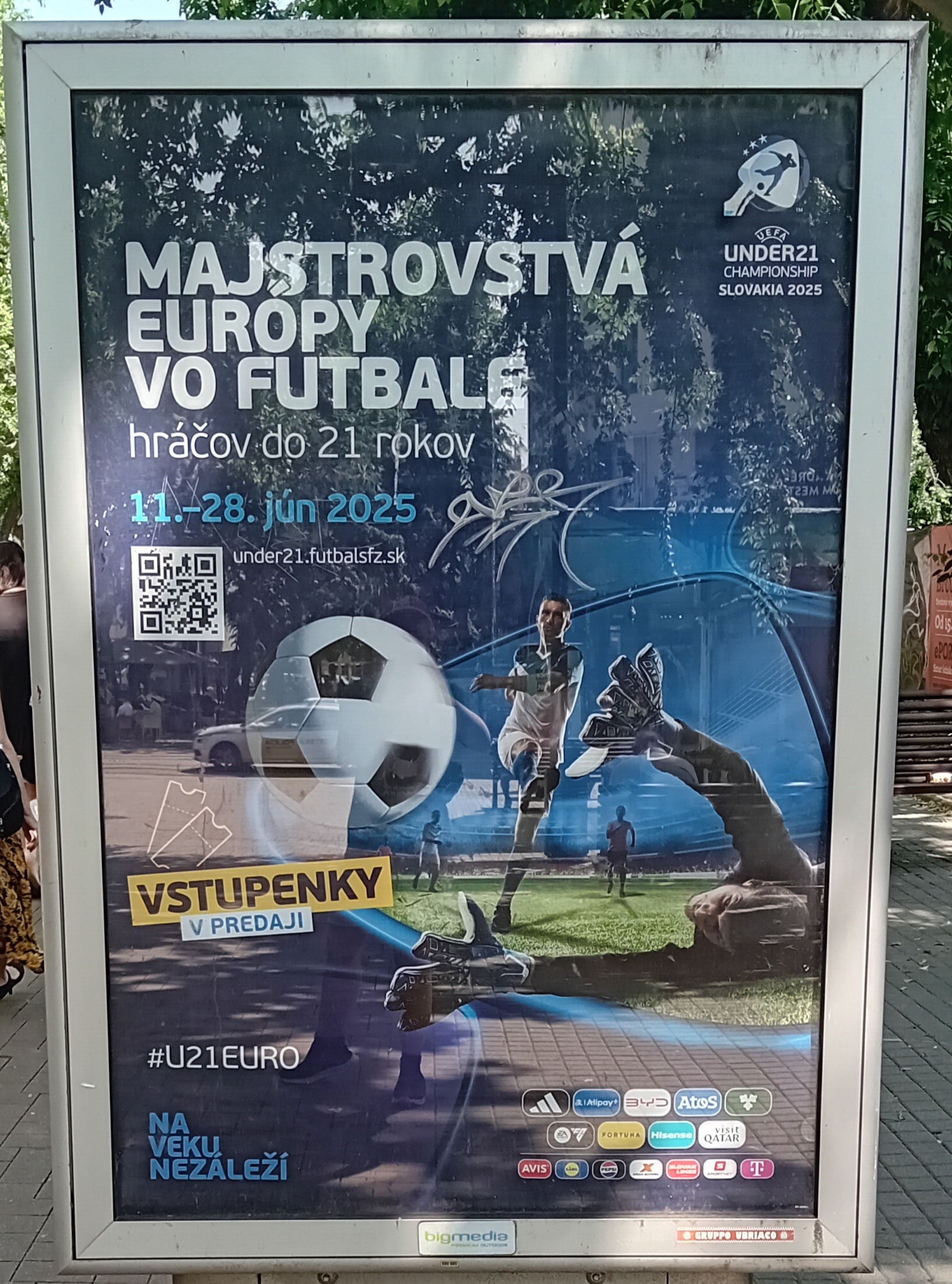
Event venue advertising panel in Slovak

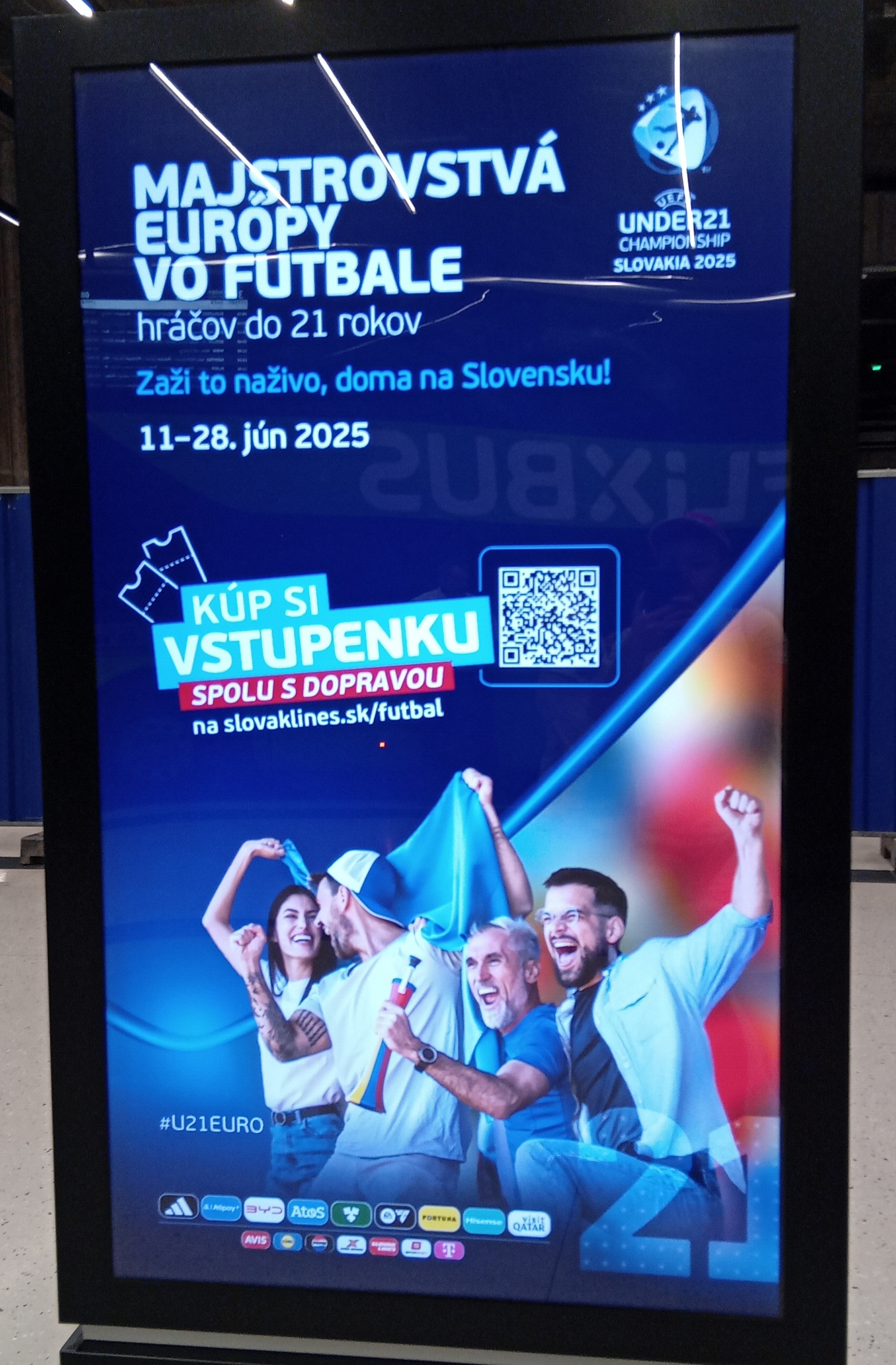
Event venue advertising panel in Slovak

The 2025 UEFA European Under-21 Championship (also known as UEFA Under-21 Euro 2025) was the 25th edition of the UEFA European Under-21 Championship (28th edition if the Under-23 era is also included), the biennial international youth football championship organised by UEFA for the men's under-21 national teams of Europe. A total of 16 teams played in the final tournament. Players born on or after 1 January 2002 were eligible to participate.

The tournament took place from 11 to 28 June 2025 and was hosted by Slovakia, who beat Belgium and Croatia in the bidding process. This is the Slovak's second time hosting after hosting the 2000 UEFA European Under-21 Championship. It was the first 16-team tournament which was hosted in a single country. This was Slovakia's biggest football tournament they ever held.

16 teams took part for the third time since 2021. Qualification took place between March 2023 and November 2024. Georgia and Slovenia qualified on merit for the first time after previously co-hosting the 2023 and 2021 editions respectively.

England defeated Germany 3–2 in the final after extra time in Bratislava, thereby successfully defending their 2023 title and winning their fourth title overall.

UEFA deemed the tournament a success, with records being broken. A record amount of sponsors were part of the tournament. Overall, a record 120 million people watched the tournament. However, the Slovak Football Association did not get a profit after hosting the event. President of Slovakia Peter Pellegrini also stated the event was a big success as he said it was a great advertisement of the country.

== Host selection ==
In July 2021, UEFA opened the bidding process. The following countries applied:

- Belgium – Slovak media reported that Belgium was also a candidate for the hosting rights.
- Croatia – Slovak media had stated that Croatia was a rival for Slovakia.
- Slovakia – On 1 December 2021, the Slovak Football Association submitted a candidacy for the tournament. Slovak federation president, Ján Kováčik, stated that they had the infrastructure for the event and it was the logical step for the country in its organisation of football tournaments as they cannot host anything bigger. The Slovak federation contemplated if they should bid for 3 months before they decided to proceed with the application. In autumn 2022, the Slovak federation met with UEFA president, Aleksander Čeferin, and reiterated to him that their bid was serious.

UEFA Executive Committee chose Slovakia as the host on 25 January 2023 at a meeting in Nyon. Slovakia's experience with hosting UEFA tournaments was deemed as a factor behind their successful bid. This is the Slovak's second time hosting, after 2000. Slovakia became the first country to host this tournament alone since the expansion to 16 teams. Other UEFA tournaments Slovakia have hosted are the 2013 UEFA European Under-17 Championship, 2016 UEFA Women's Under-19 Championship and 2022 UEFA European Under-19 Championship.

Organisers expected 50,000 people from across Europe to attend the event.

== Preparations ==
=== 2023 ===
- On 20 July 2023, members of the federation, alongside representatives of the host cities, had their first official meeting on organizing the European Under-21 Football Championship.
- In October 2023, UEFA officials came to Slovakia to further inspect their venues and were satisfied with them. At the same time, the Slovak federation proposed that the tournament is held from 18 June to 5 July.

=== 2024 ===
- In February 2024, the Slovak sports support fund gave 2.5 million euros for the organisation of the championship.
- In April 2024, UEFA had their second venue inspection visit, where it was confirmed that the Slovak Philharmonic in Bratislava will host the draw on 3 December 2024.
- On 9 June 2024, a meeting between the organizers and representatives of the Žilina city council took place.
- In August 2024, the secretary general of the Slovak Football Association, Peter Palenčík, expressed satisfaction with the preparations and stated that they were in the final phase of preparations; while also clarifying that a UEFA delegation will come for their third visit in September 2024.
- In late September 2024, UEFA inspected the stadiums in Košice, Trenčín and Žilina. They would later inspect the other five stadiums in early October 2024.
- On 16 October 2024, Ján Kováčik stated that his ambition is to have 300,000 spectators and 100 million people watch on televisions across the world.
- On 29 October 2024, former Slovak footballers, Marek Sapara and Vratislav Greško, alongside fitness coach Maroš Molnár, were unveiled as tournament ambassadors.
- On 17 December 2024, Chinese car manufacturer, BYD became a sponsor for the tournament.
- Between 3 and 15 December 2025, a trophy tour was organised throughout the eight host cities.

=== 2025 ===
- In February and March 2025, UEFA delegates had their fourth and final inspection visit.
- Between 27 and 29 March 2025, an event at the Nivy Station in Bratislava took place. Activities included taking a picture of the trophy and getting autographs by Slovak international footballers.
- On 22 April 2025, Czech betting company, Fortuna, was brought in as a sponsor.
- During April 2025, to recruit volunteers for the tournament, an volunteer roadshow was organised throughout every host city.
- On 28 May 2025, the championship's marketing director, Lukáš Donoval, stated that the preparations were almost finished for the competition and that this was one of the most logistically demanding tournaments the country has hosted.

==== During the tournament ====
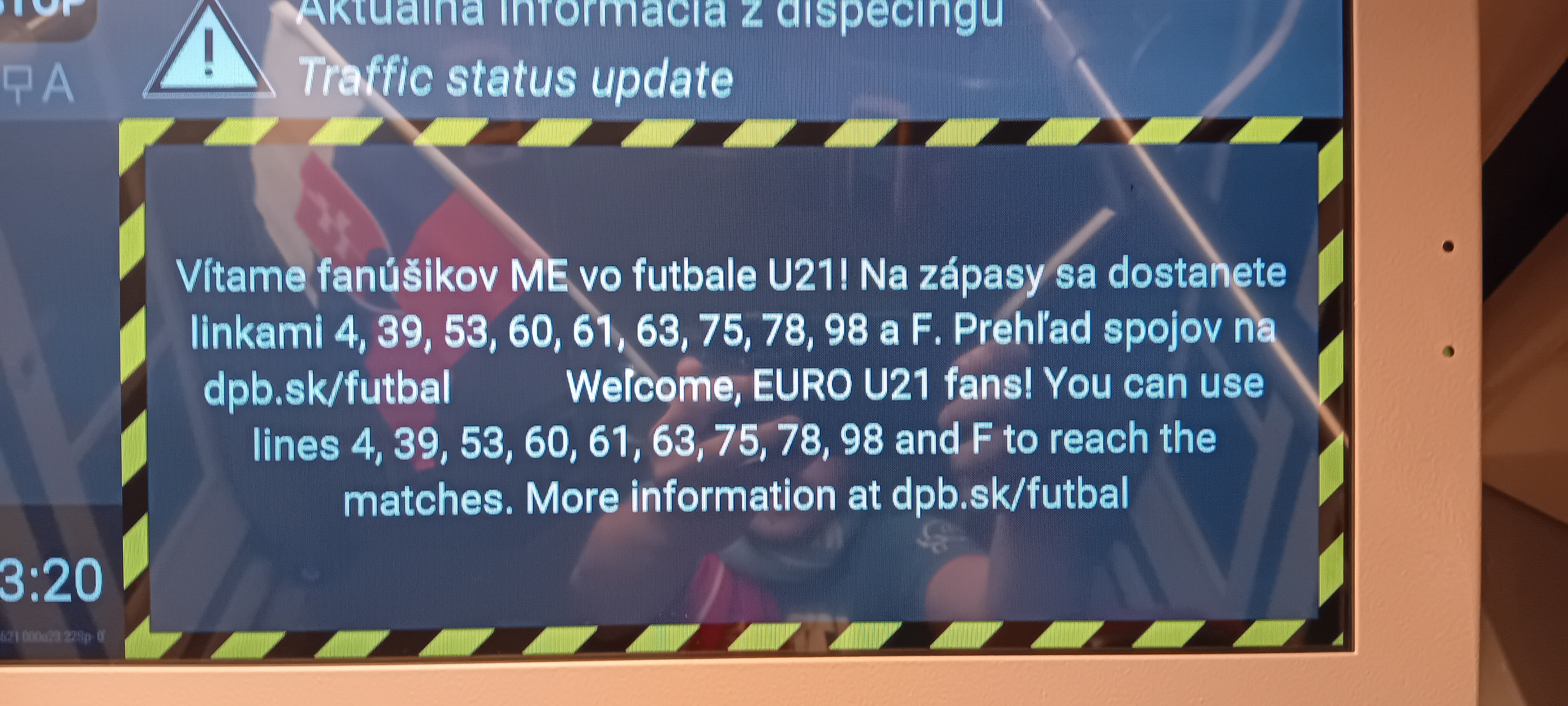
Bus sign for 2025 UEFA European Under-21 Championship in Bratislava.

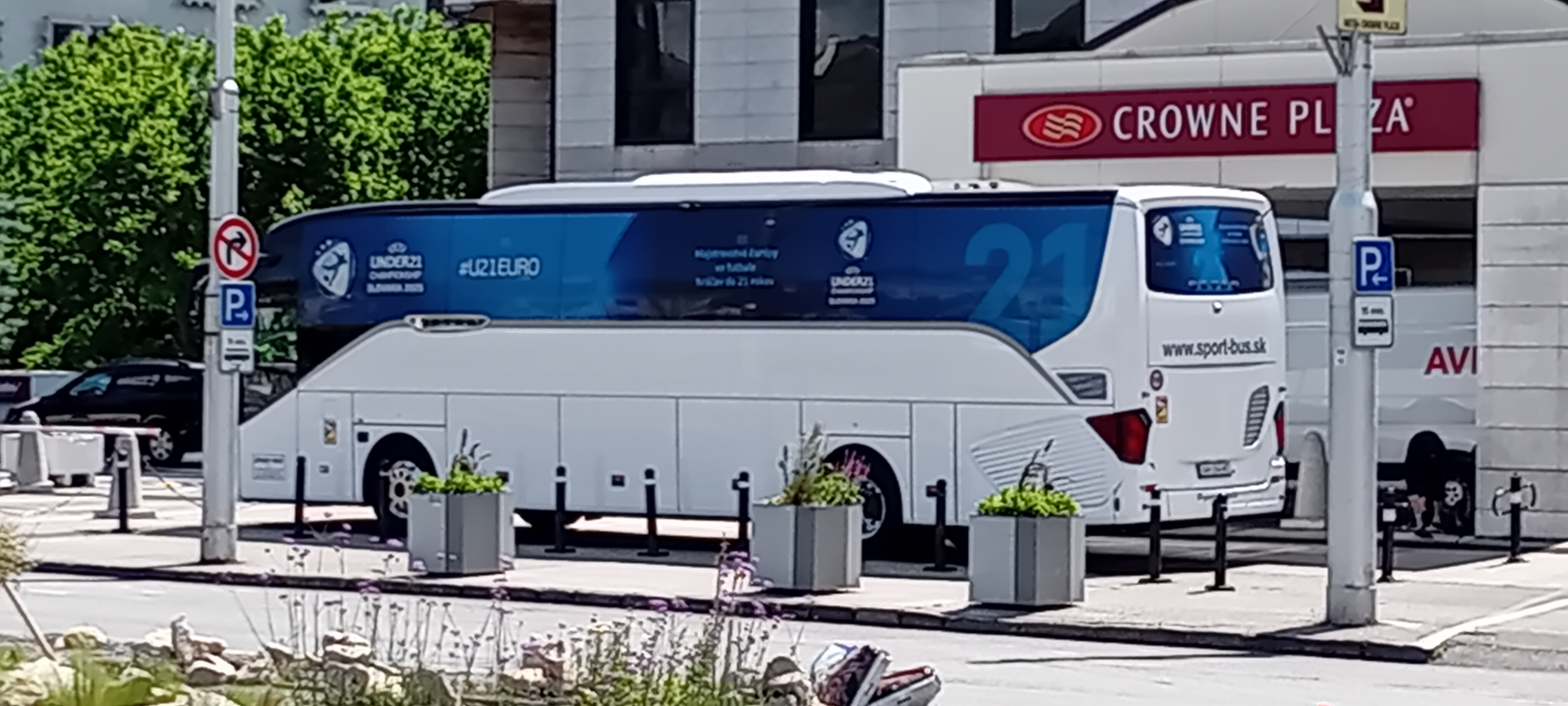
2025 UEFA European Under-21 Championship bus in Bratislava.

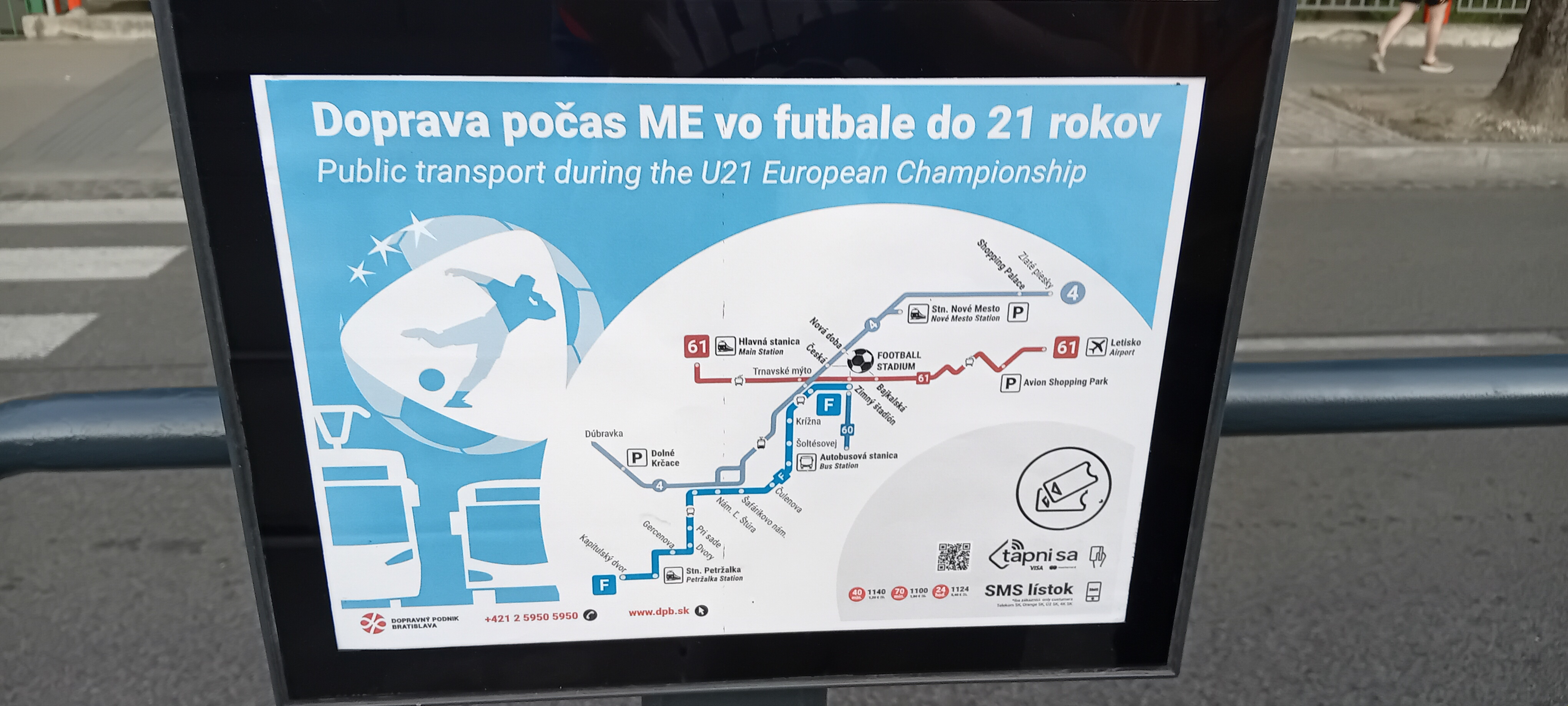
Transport sign for 2025 UEFA European Under-21 Championship in Bratislava.

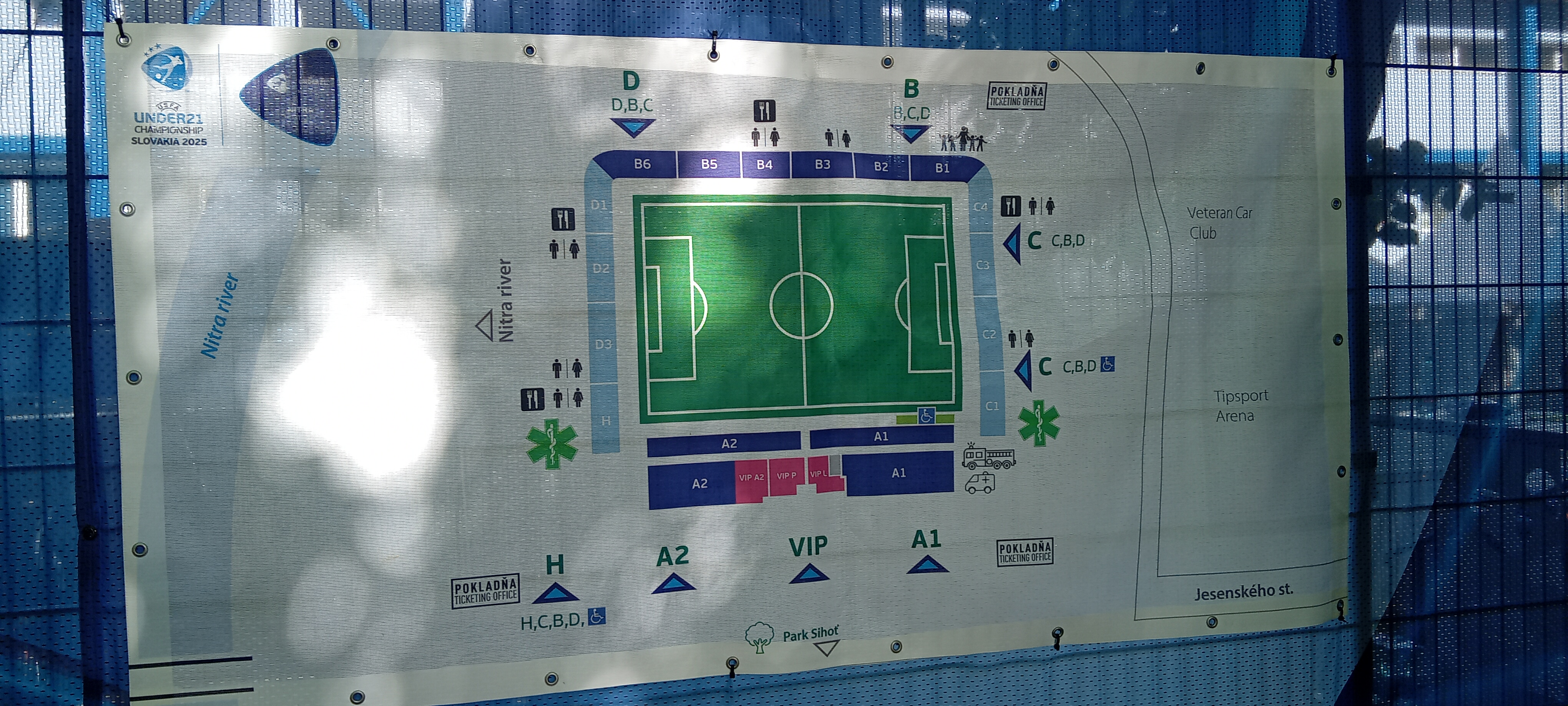
Nitra Stadium map before England vs Slovenia match at 2025 UEFA European Under-21 Championship.

- Due to traffic restrictions on matchdays in Žilina, public authorities increased the public transport services in the city. Similar provisions were put in place in Bratislava as well.
- Czech fans briefly criticised the organisation after the failure of the championship organizers to provide shuttle transport after their match vs England in Dunajská Streda.
- On 16 June 2025, Ján Kováčik stated he had received positive feedback about the start of the tournament.
- Due to already having a training session at the National Football Stadium in Bratislava earlier in the tournament, Romania had to train at FK Rača's (a team who play in the third tier) training facilities before their last game against Slovakia.
- During the tournament, 54 sustainability-focused activities took place.
- For the tournament, police officers from Czech Republic, Poland and Romania were used.

==== Televising rights ====
- In Slovakia, STVR broadcast the tournament.

=== Tickets ===
==== 2024 ====
- On 22 October 2024, the pre-sale ticket phase for Slovak fans who registered for tickets was opened. The pre-sale phase was opened to non-registered fans a week later on 29 October. Hours into the pre-sale, 12,513 tickets had already been sold. The pre-sale ticket sales reportedly exceeded UEFA's expectations.
- On 4 December 2024, tickets were put on sale for fans outside of Slovakia.
- A very limited amount of tickets were put on sale in Prešov at the beginning of the ticketing process, due to the contractor being forced to change the markings of some sections and seats, meaning it would have been unknown how many tickets would be on sale per section.

==== 2025 ====
- By March 2025, 150,000 tickets were sold.
- On 27 March 2025, a further 25,000 tickets were put on sale.
- On 14 April 2025, 1,800 extra tickets for Slovakia vs Italy in Trnava were released.
- On 21 May 2025, the final wave of tickets were released.
- Two weeks before the tournament, the organising committee stated that 235,000 tickets were sold.
- As of 6 June 2025, 250,000 tickets were purchased. That figure broke the record for most tickets sold before the tournament.
- As of 11 June 2025, 254,000 tickets were sold.
- On 24 June 2025, 1,000 new tickets for the final were made available.

The most tickets bought from a foreign country was from Czech Republic, followed by Finland, Germany, Romania and England. The organisers hoped for a 80% occupancy rate at the stadiums. In total, 358,393 tickets were made available. 250,492 total spectators were at the matches. SFZ marketing director, Lukáš Donoval, reported that 292,331 tickets were sold, an 82.5% occupancy rate.

=== Sponsors ===
- Adidas
- Alipay
- Avis
- Atos
- BYD
- Carlsberg
- EA Sports
- Fortuna
- Hisense
- Lidl
- Pepsi
- Rádio Expres
- Slovak Lines
- Sportnet
- Telekom
- Visit Qatar
- Qatar Airways

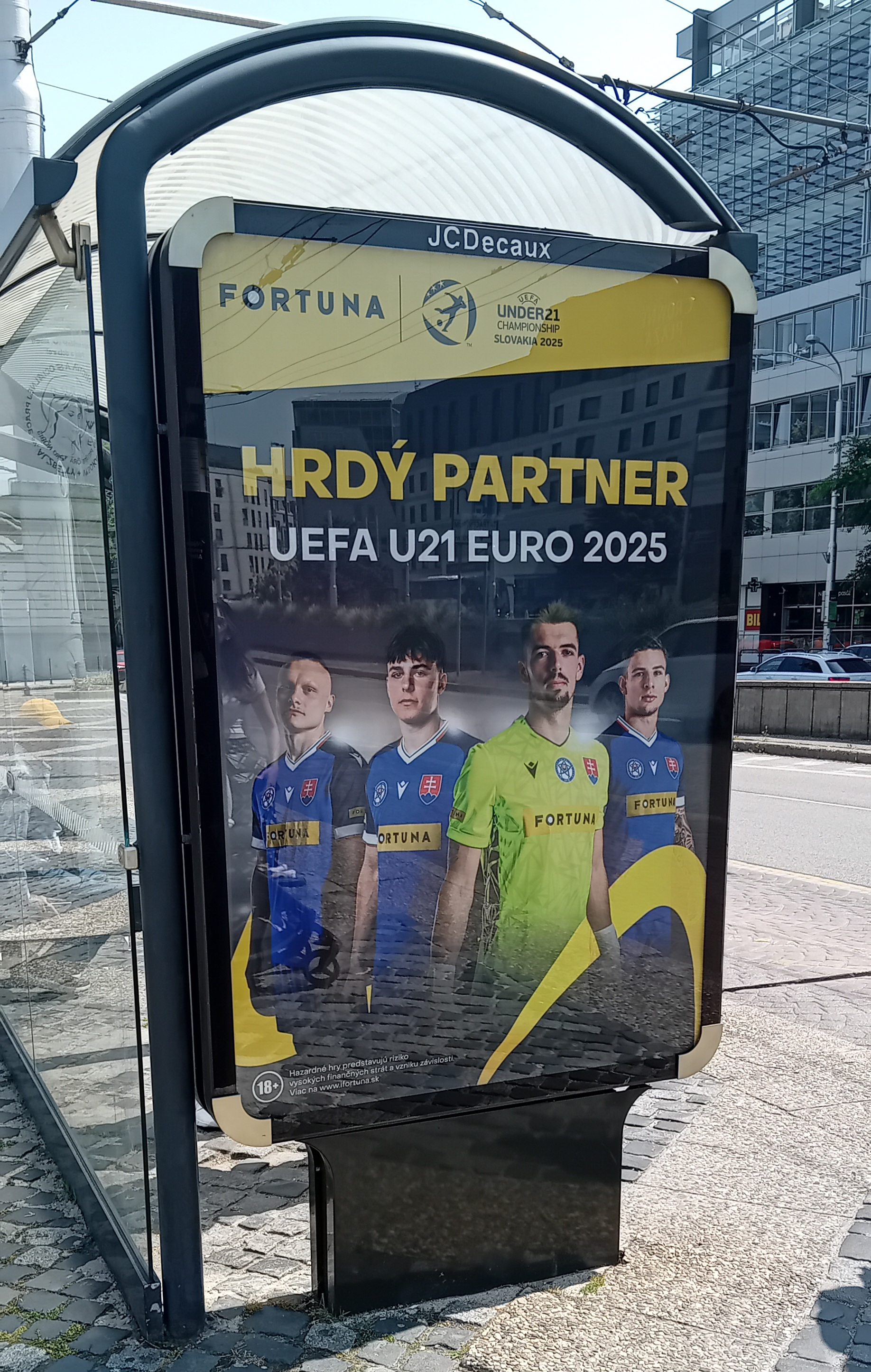
Fortuna advertising panel.

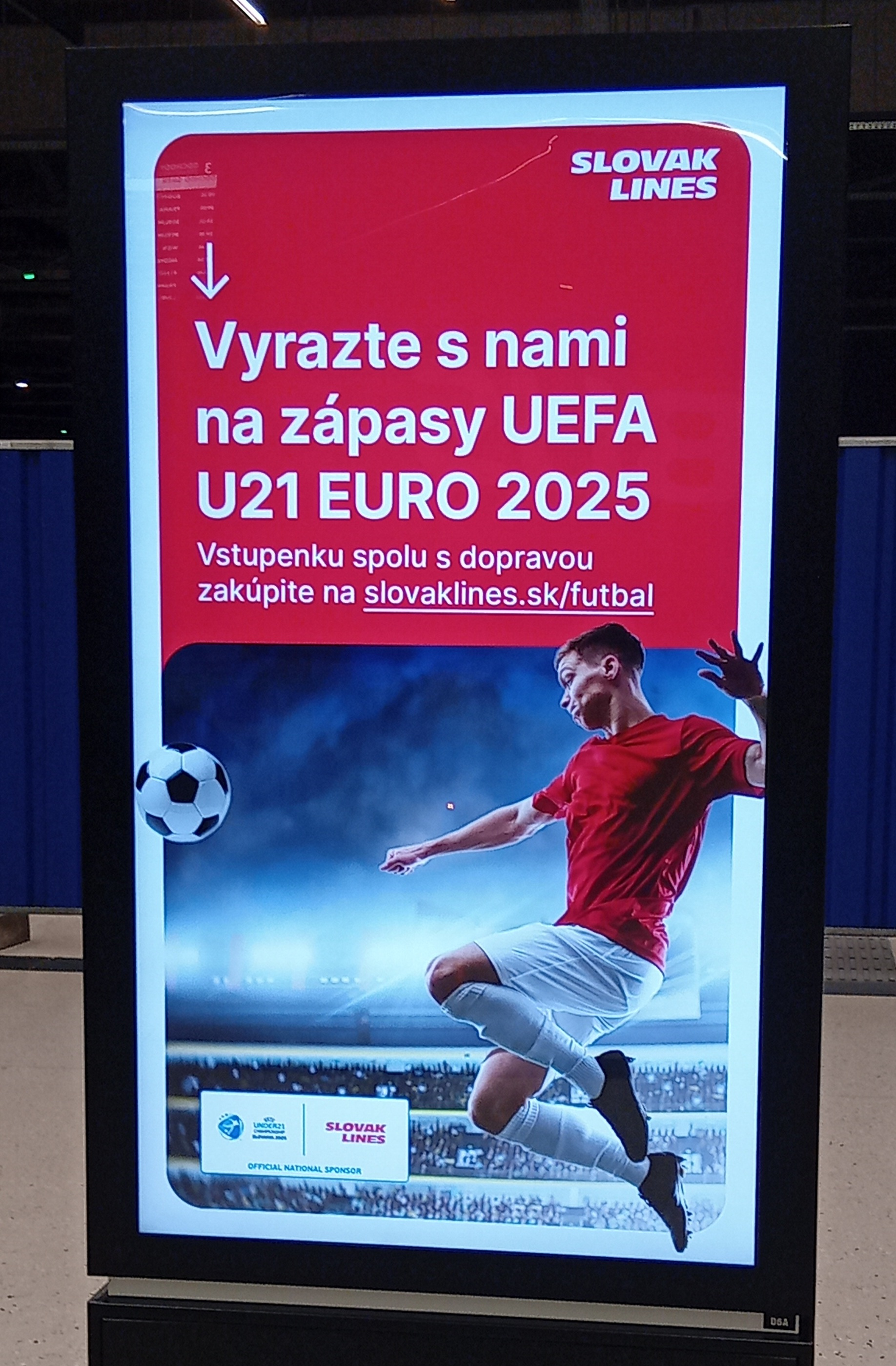
Slovak Lines advertising panel.

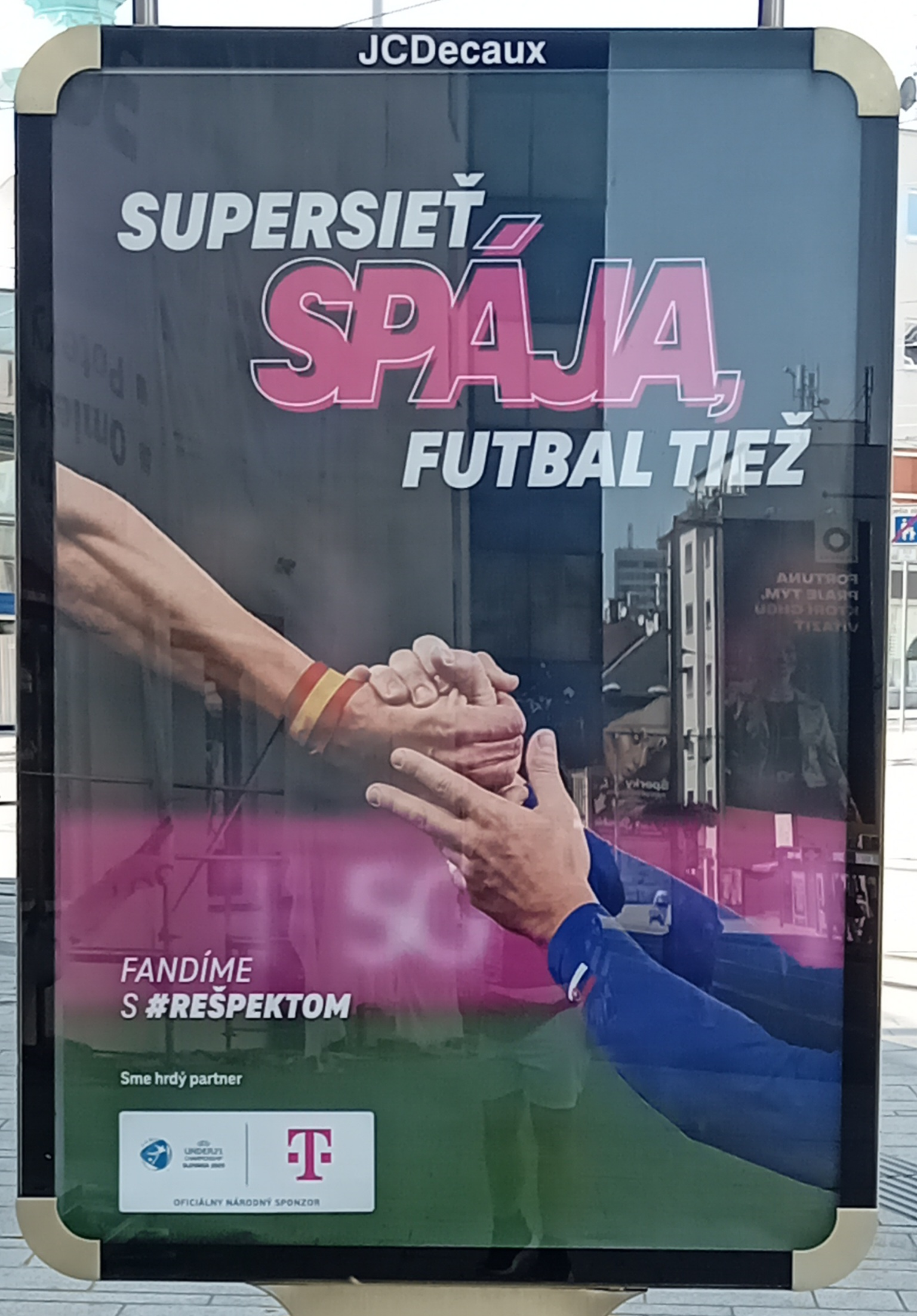
Telekom advertising panel.

== Venues ==
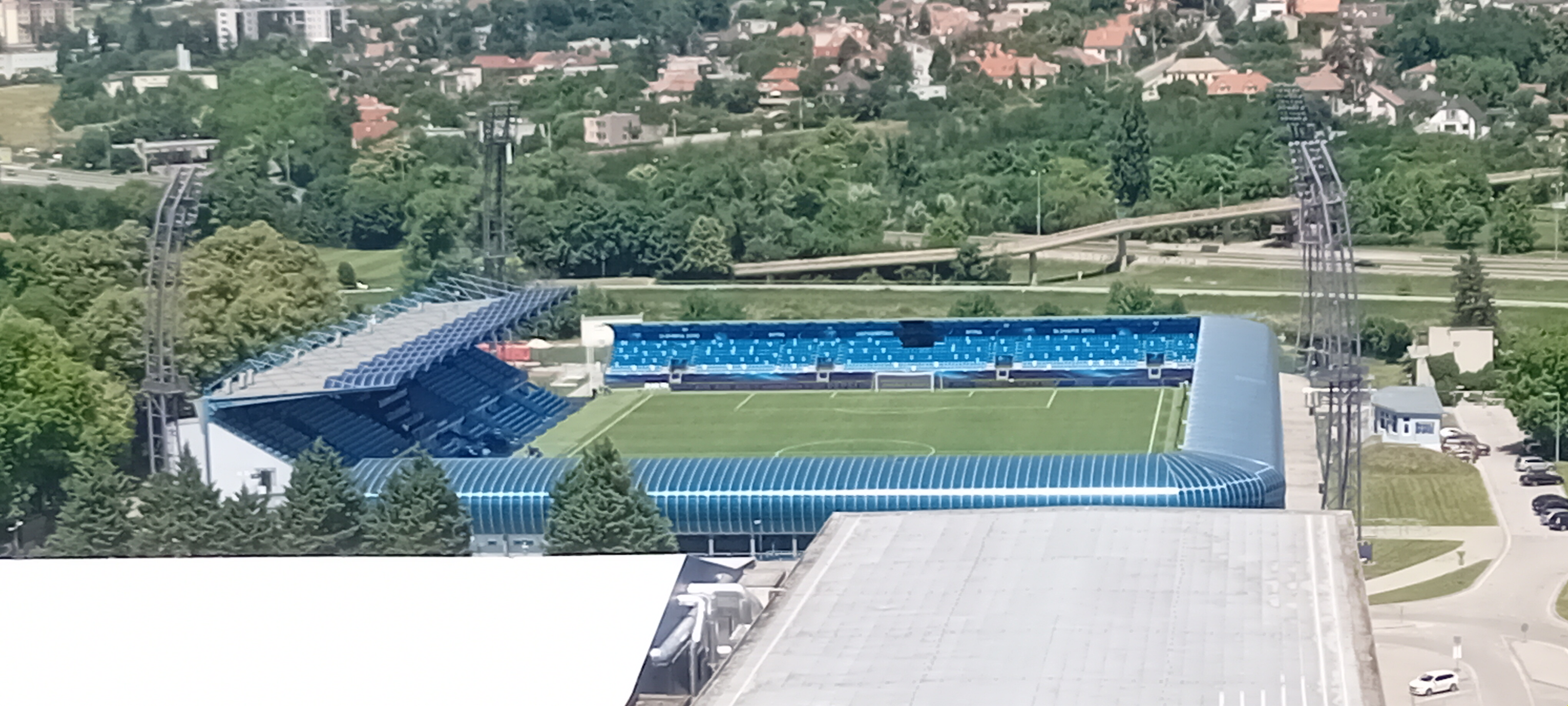
Nitra Stadium before England vs Slovenia match at 2025 UEFA European Under-21 Championship.

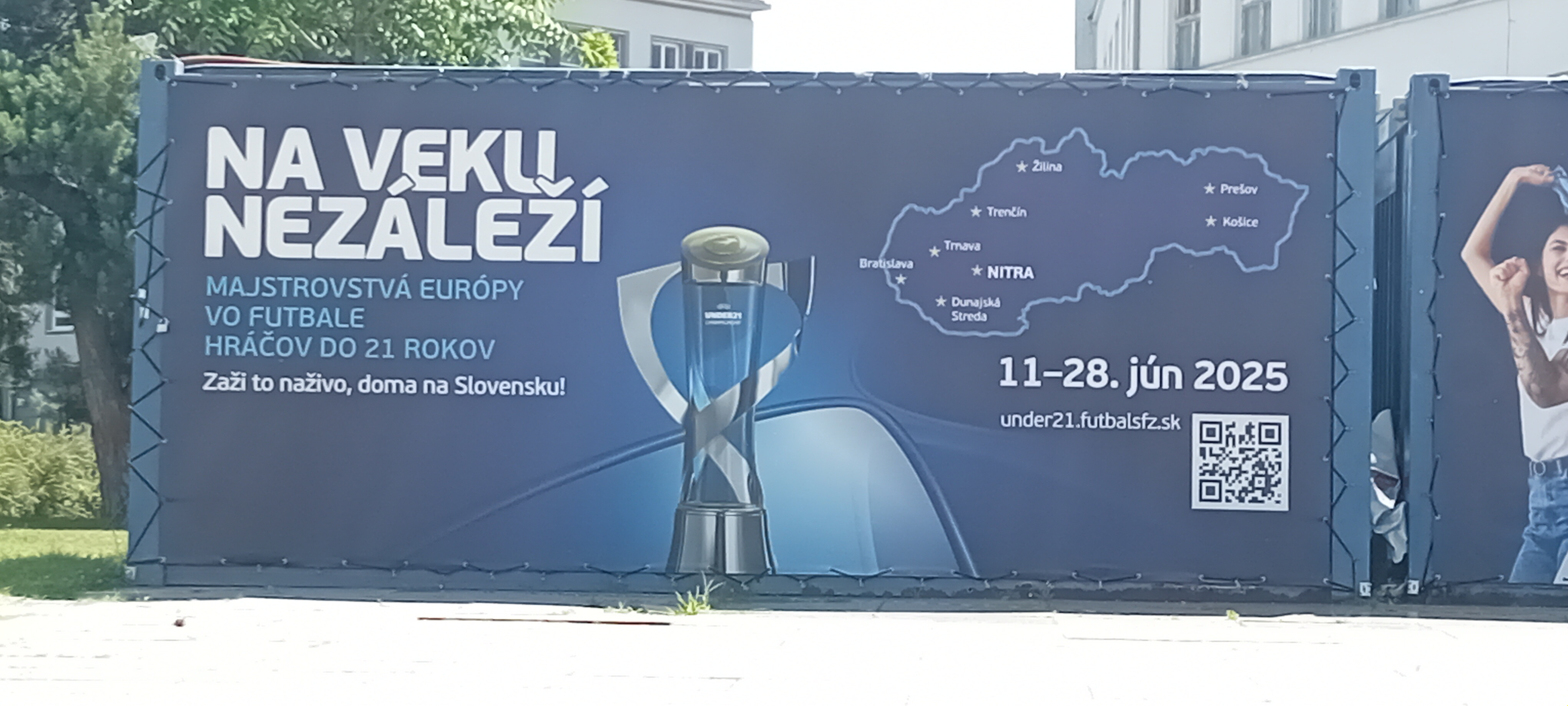
Advertising board in Nitra.

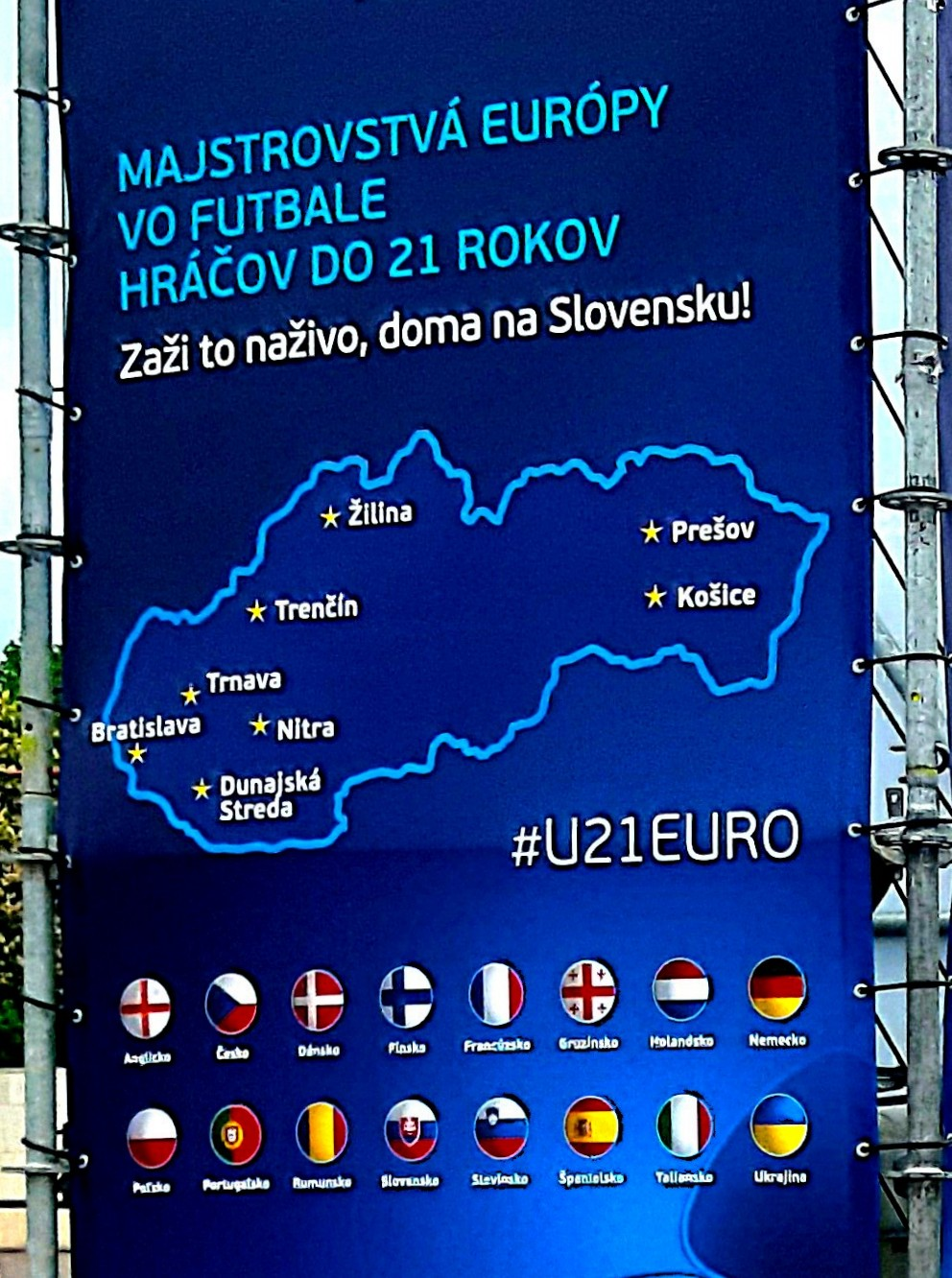
Event venue advertising panel in Slovak

Slovakia's eight proposed venues during the bidding process were used for the tournament. The eight stadiums were spread across seven of the eight Slovak regions, with the exception of Banská Bystrica Region. Trnava Region was the only region to have multiple host cities, Trnava and Dunajská Streda. The average capacity of the stadiums was 12,500. Six venues used for the competition were deemed category 4, with only Nitra and Prešov's stadiums being classified as category 3.

Seven stadiums were already built before the competition was given to Slovakia, with Prešov's being the only stadium being constructed during the tournament's preparations. Ján Kováčik had stated the if Prešov's stadium wasn't built in time, they had back-up options.

The implementation of natural grass pitches in Trenčín and Žilina was also done before the tournament. Košice's stadium was also upgraded during the tournament's preparations and was completed on 30 April 2024. Košice's upgrades include the installation of an LED screen, camera system and other accessories, plus an additional 6,719 seats were also added, bringing the final capacity to 12,555. 17 training areas were available for the championship, including one for referees.

Despite being already built and meeting requirements, concerns were brought up about the Štadión pod Zoborom (later renamed the Nitra Stadium for the tournament) in Nitra due to lack the lack of experience the stadium had hosting big events. Mária Berdisová, director of the organizing committee proclaimed that in terms of infrastructure readiness, Bratislava was the best prepared and Nitra was the least prepared, as the latter had the most adjustments that needed to be made for the tournament.

The group pairings were announced on 20 July 2023. The pairings were as follows: Bratislava and Trnava in Group A, Dunajská Streda and Nitra in Group B, Trenčín and Žilina in Group C and Košice being paired with Prešov in Group D.

The neighbouring Czechs who visited the country during the tournament were astonished with the quality of the Slovak's stadiums.

=== Construction of Prešov's stadium ===
The Tatran Arena in Prešov was the only venue that was completely under construction during the preparations of the championship. It was the most contentious point of the preparations as concerns were raised numerous times that the venue would not be built in time. Before Slovakia received the hosting rights, the city of Prešov had previously signed a memorandum of cooperation with the Slovak Football Association about hosting games. By May 2023, construction on the stadium had still not started, signaling more doubts about the venue's readiness. Although, the building of the venue was included in Slovakia's list of sports infrastructure of national importance a month before. The stadium finally started to be built on 27 June 2023. In October 2023, the Slovak federation stated their confidence that the stadium will be built on schedule. On 13 December 2023, the company, tasked with creating the stadium, reversed their decision to terminate their contract and continued to build the stadium. By April 2024, the situation calmed down significantly as the construction was going according to plan. In November 2024, a problem aroused when a criminal report was filed a month before surrounding the stadium and its ongoing construction. However, the problem was quickly fixed after the city and the construction company agreed on a date for the completion of the construction part of the works on the arena. In March 2025, the stadium was nearing its completion and was already handed over to the authorities in Prešov. In April 2025, the venue was finally complete. On 3 May 2025, the official opening of the stadium was done. The stadium was inaugurated with a match between the retired Tatran Prešov internationals and Slovakia internationals.

Tatran Arena in Prešov raised 500,000 Euros to host the event.

Tournament venues information
| Venue | Built | Rounds | Games | References |
|---|---|---|---|---|
| National Football Stadium, Bratislava | 2019 | Group A, Semi-finals and Final | 5 | |
| Košice Football Arena, Košice | 2024 | Group D and Semi-finals | 4 | |
| Anton Malatinský Stadium, Trnava | 2015 | Group A and Quarter-finals | 4 | |
| DAC Aréna, Dunajská Streda | 2019 | Group B and Quarter-finals | 4 | |
| MŠK Žilina Stadium, Žilina | 2015 | Group C and Quarter-finals | 4 | |
| Tatran Arena, Prešov | 2025 | Group A and Quarter-finals | 4 | |
| Nitra Stadium, Nitra | 2018 | Group B | 3 | |
| Sihoť Stadium, Trenčín | 2021 | Group C | 3 | |

| Bratislava | Trnava | Košice | Dunajská Streda |
|---|---|---|---|
| National Football Stadium | Anton Malatinský Stadium | Košice Football Arena | DAC Aréna |
| Capacity: 22,500 | Capacity: 18,100 | Capacity: 12,658 | Capacity: 12,525 |
2025 UEFA European Under-21 Championship (Slovakia)
| Žilina | Nitra | Prešov | Trenčín |
| MŠK Žilina Stadium | Nitra Stadium | Tatran Arena | Sihoť Stadium |
| Capacity: 11,200 | Capacity: 7,246 | Capacity: 6,448 | Capacity: 6,366 |

=== Fan zones ===
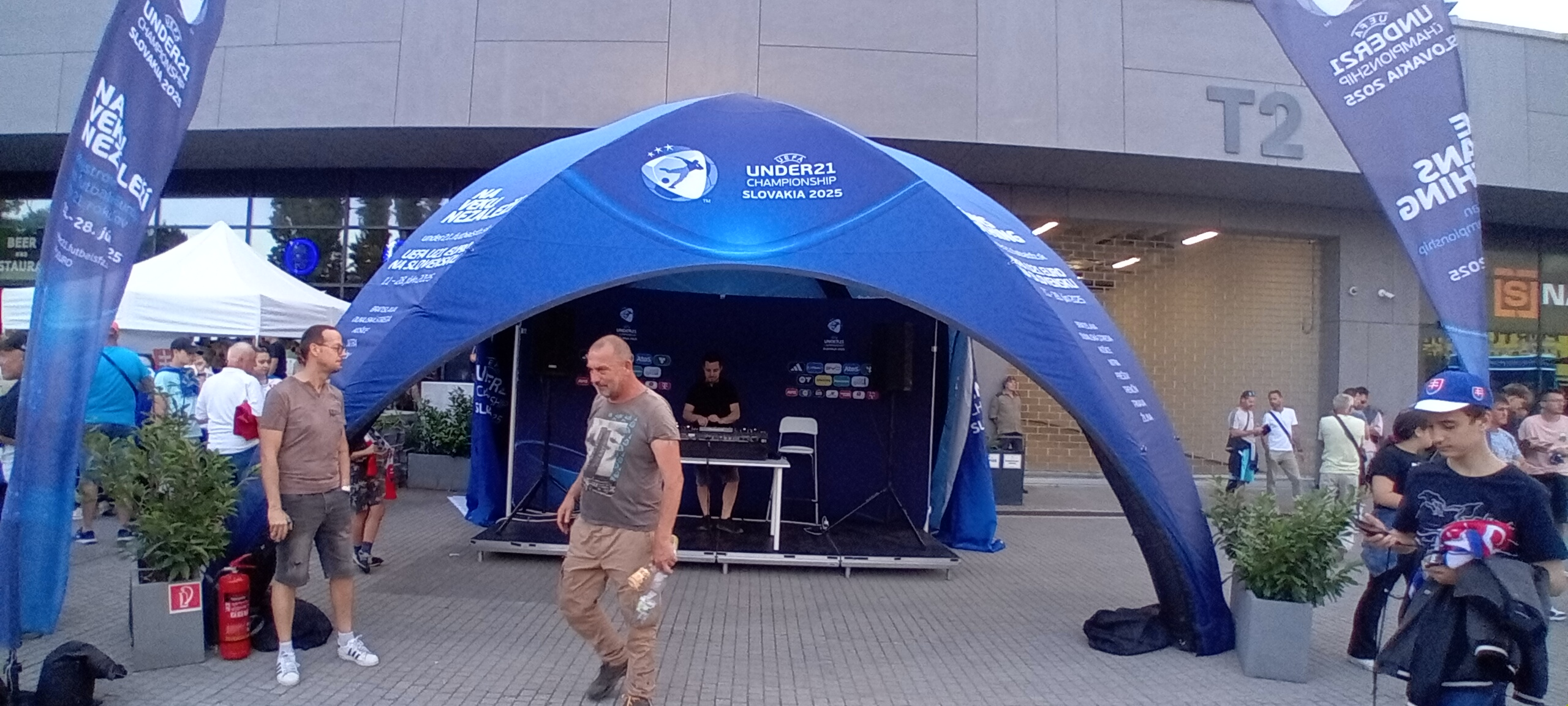
DJ booth at the fan zone near the National Football Stadium in Bratislava.

Fan zones were organised at every host city. In Trnava, the fan zone was at the SNP square near the city center. In Žilina, you could find the city's fan zone at the Hlinkov square. The other six fan zones, in Bratislava, Dunajská Streda, Košice, Nitra, Prešov and Trenčín, were next to the stadium.

== Qualification ==
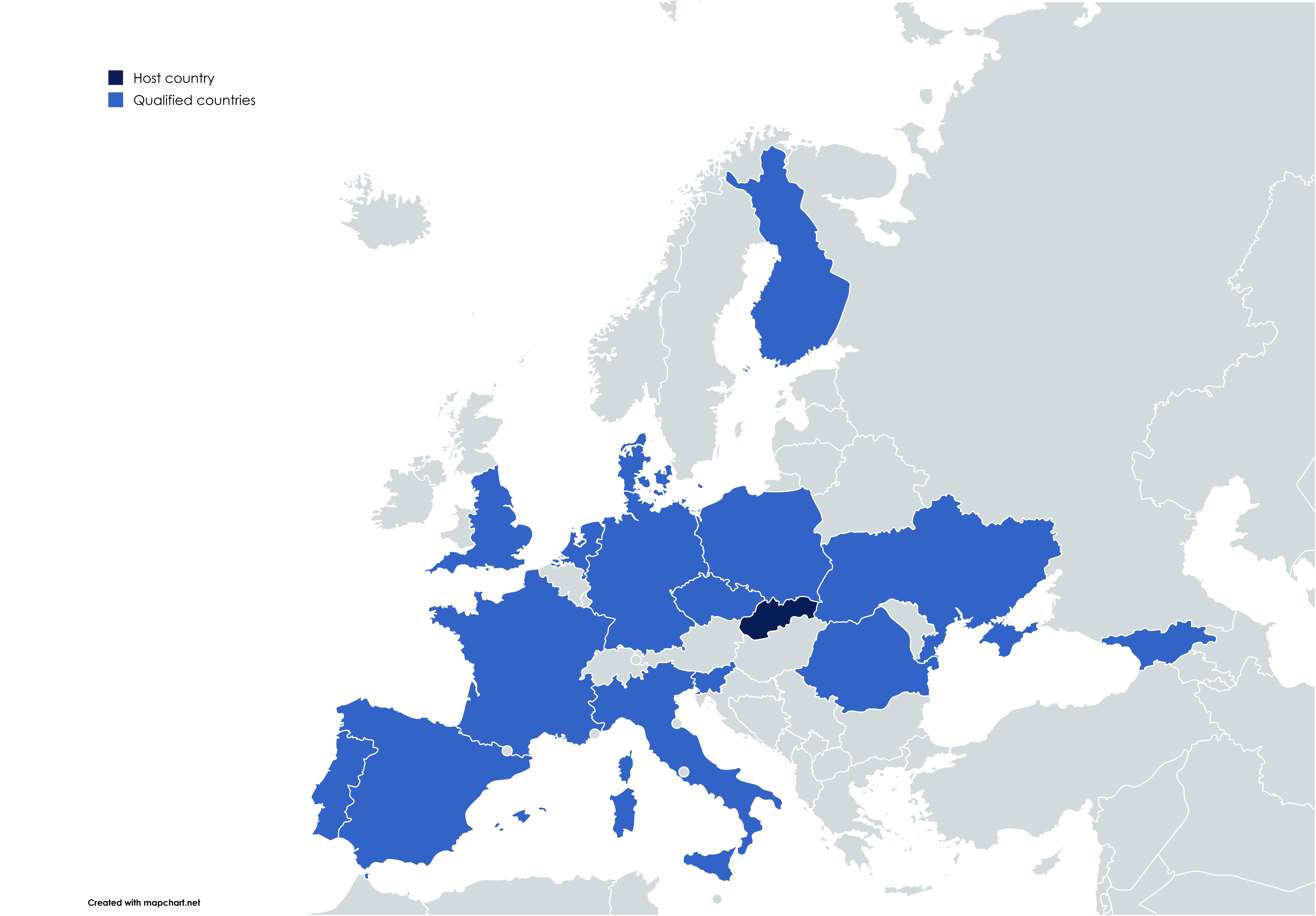
2025 UEFA European Under-21 Championship − Map of qualified countries

In the qualification group stage, 52 teams were drawn into nine groups: seven groups of six teams and two groups of five teams. The draw for the qualifying group stage was held on 2 February 2023 in Nyon at 08:00 CET. The qualifying group stage took place from 24 March 2023 to 15 October 2024. Each group was played in home-and-away round-robin format. The nine group winners and the three best runners-up (not counting results against the sixth-placed team) qualified directly for the final tournament, while the remaining six runners-up advanced to the play-offs.

In the play-offs, the six teams were drawn into three ties to play home-and-away two-legged matches to determine the last three qualified teams. The play-off draw took place on 17 October 2024 in Nyon. The qualifying group stage took place from 24 March 2023 to 15 October 2024, while the play-offs were held between the 15 to 19 November 2024.

Of the qualified teams, 11 were present at the previous edition. Georgia and Slovenia qualified on merit for the first time after previously co-hosting the 2023 and 2021 editions respectively. Finland had the longest absence, with their last appearance being in 2009. Hosts Slovakia came back after their last appearance in 2017. Poland returned, with the last time the Poles qualified being in 2019. Denmark qualified after missing out in 2023.

Of the absentees, Croatia couldn't make it after losing on penalties to Georgia in the play-offs, ending their three successive tournament qualification streak. Switzerland failed to qualify after making two consecutive appearances. Belgium, Israel and Norway all failed to qualify after their sporadic appearances in 2023.

According to the UEFA coefficient rankings as of February 2025, the highest ranked team to not qualify was Switzerland, ranked 11th. Excluding the hosts Slovakia, ranked 23rd, the lowest ranked team to qualify was Finland, placed 20th.

=== Qualified teams ===
The following teams qualified for the final tournament.

Note: All appearance statistics include only U-21 era (since 1978).

| Team | Qualification method | Date of qualification | Appearance(s) | | | | Previous best performance (Note: Bold text indicates they hosted that edition.) | Rank |
| Team | Qualification method | Date of qualification | Total | First | Last | Streak | Previous best performance | Rank |
|---|---|---|---|---|---|---|---|---|
| Slovakia | Hosts | 25 January 2023 | 3rd (Note: If Czechoslovakia's appearances are included, it is Slovakia's 9th time participating.) | 2000 | 2017 | 1 | Fourth place (2000) | 23 |
| Netherlands | Group C winners | 9 September 2024 | 10th | 1988 | 2023 | 3 | Champions (2006, 2007) | 4 |
| Spain | Group B winners | 10 September 2024 | 17th | 1982 | 2023 | 5 | Champions (1986, 1998, 2011, 2013, 2019) | 1 |
| Portugal | Group G winners | 11 October 2024 | 11th | 1994 | 2023 | 3 | Runners-up (1994, 2015, 2021) | 3 |
| Germany | Group D winners | 11 October 2024 | 15th | 1982 | 2023 | 7 | Champions (2009, 2017, 2021) | 5 |
| Denmark | Group I winners | 11 October 2024 | 10th | 1978 | 2021 | 1 | Semi-finals (1992, 2015) | 9 |
| Ukraine | Three best runners-up | 11 October 2024 | 4th (Note: If Soviet Union's appearances are included, it is Ukraine's 7th time participating.) | 2006 | 2023 | 2 | Runners-up (2006) | 7 |
| England | Group F winners | 12 October 2024 | 18th | 1978 | 2023 | 10 | Champions (1982, 1984, 2023) | 2 |
| Romania | Group E winners | 15 October 2024 | 5th | 1998 | 2023 | 4 | Semi-finals (2019) | 10 |
| Poland | Three best runners-up | 15 October 2024 | 8th | 1982 | 2019 | 1 | Quarter-finals (1982, 1984, 1986, 1992, 1994) | 14 |
| Slovenia | Group H winners | 15 October 2024 | 2nd (Note: If Yugoslavia's appearances are included, it is Slovenia's 7th time participating.) | 2021 | | 1 | Group stage (2021) | 19 |
| France | Three best runners-up | 15 October 2024 | 12th | 1982 | 2023 | 4 | Champions (1988) | 6 |
| Italy | Group A winners | 15 October 2024 | 23rd | 1978 | 2023 | 7 | Champions (1992, 1994, 1996, 2000, 2004) | 7 |
| Finland | Play-offs winner | 19 November 2024 | 2nd | 2009 | | 1 | Group stage (2009) | 20 |
| Czech Republic | Play-offs winner | 19 November 2024 | 10th (Note: If Czechoslovakia's appearances are included, it is Czech Republic's 16th time participating.) | 1996 | 2023 | 3 | Champions (2002) | 13 |
| Georgia | Play-offs winner | 19 November 2024 | 2nd (Note: If Soviet Union's appearances are included, it is Georgia's 5th time participating.) | 2023 | | 2 | Quarter-finals (2023) | 17 |

== Draw ==
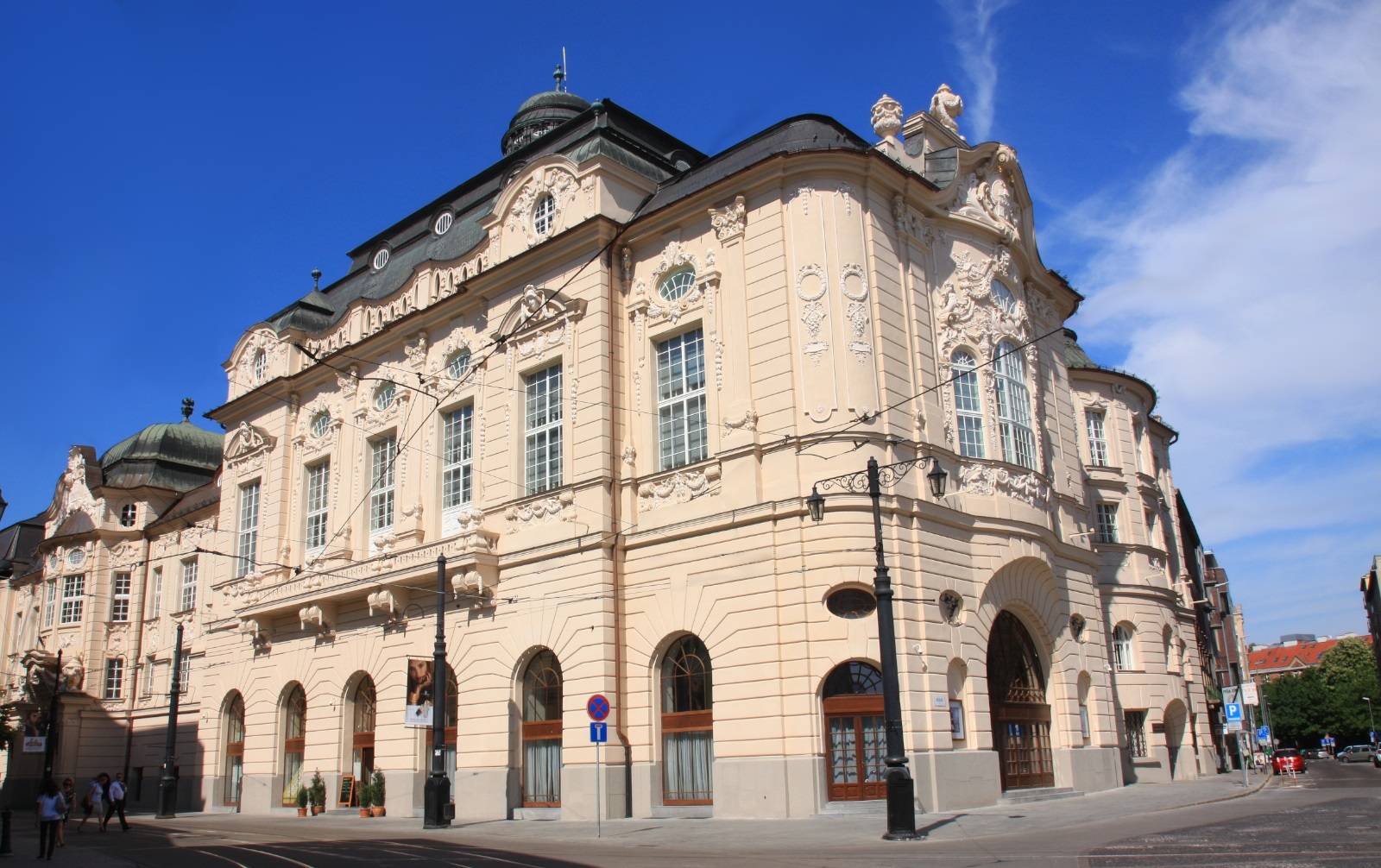
The Slovak Philharmonic in Bratislava hosted the draw.

The draw was held at 19:00 CET on 3 December 2024 at the Slovak Philharmonic in Bratislava, Slovakia. Slovak presenter, Vera Wisterová, hosted the draw. The guests were former Slovak footballers, Juraj Kucka and Vratislav Greško, whom are both ambassadors for the tournament and assisted with the draw. Before the draw started, hosts Slovakia were pre-allocated into position A1 in Group A. The draw started with, in order, pots 1, 2, 3 and 4 being drawn, with each team selected then allocated into the first available group alphabetically. The position for the team within the group would then be drawn (for the purpose of the schedule).

=== Seeding ===
The seeding was based on the UEFA men's U-21 national team coefficient rankings as of November 2024.

Pot 1
| Team | Rank | Coeff |
|---|---|---|
| Spain | 1 | 42,177 |
| England | 2 | 39,964 |
| Portugal | 3 | 39,098 |
| Netherlands | 4 | 38,730 |

Pot 2
| Team | Rank | Coeff |
|---|---|---|
| Germany | 5 | 36,793 |
| France | 6 | 35,632 |
| Ukraine | 7 | 33,734 |
| Italy | 8 | 33,701 |

Pot 3
| Team | Rank | Coeff |
|---|---|---|
| Denmark | 9 | 33,266 |
| Romania | 10 | 31,493 |
| Poland | 13 | 30,732 |
| Czech Republic | 14 | 30,100 |

Pot 4
| Team | Rank | Coeff |
|---|---|---|
| Georgia | 17 | 29,266 |
| Slovenia | 19 | 28,886 |
| Finland | 20 | 28,552 |
| Slovakia (H) | 23 | 27,248 |

=== Draw results ===
Group A
| Pos | Team |
|---|---|
| A1 | Slovakia (H) |
| A2 | Spain |
| A3 | Italy |
| A4 | Romania |

Group B
| Pos | Team |
|---|---|
| B1 | Czech Republic |
| B2 | England |
| B3 | Germany |
| B4 | Slovenia |

Group C
| Pos | Team |
|---|---|
| C1 | Portugal |
| C2 | France |
| C3 | Poland |
| C4 | Georgia |

Group D
| Pos | Team |
|---|---|
| D1 | Finland |
| D2 | Netherlands |
| D3 | Ukraine |
| D4 | Denmark |

- 2025 UEFA European Under-21 Championship – Draw
- Draw Live Streaming

=== Schedule ===
Schedule
| Round | Matchday | Date |
|---|---|---|
| Group stage | Matchday 1 | 11–12 June 2025 |
| Group stage | Matchday 2 | 14–15 June 2025 |
| Group stage | Matchday 3 | 17–18 June 2025 |
| Knockout stage | Quarter-finals | 21–22 June 2025 |
| Knockout stage | Semi-finals | 25 June 2025 |
| Knockout stage | Final | 28 June 2025 |

== Match officials ==
On 8 March 2025, the 12 refereeing teams were announced for the tournament, including a Venezuelan team selected as part of a co-operation agreement between the UEFA and CONMEBOL. Originally, an English refereeing team including referee John Brooks alongside assistants, Simon Bennett and Daniel Robatan was selected. However, due to an injury to John Brooks, they had to be withdrawn and a Lithuanian referee team replaced them.

| Country | Referee | Assistant referees |
|---|---|---|
| Azerbaijan | Elchin Masiyev | Elshad Abdullayev; Parvin Talibov |
| Denmark | Jakob Sundberg | Victor Skytte; Deniz Yurdakul |
| Georgia | Goga Kikacheishvili | David Akhvlediani; Davit Gabisonia |
| Greece | Vasilios Fotias | Andreas Meintanas; Mihalis Papadakis |
| Italy | Simone Sozza | Alessio Berti; Davide Imperiale |
| Lithuania | Manfredas Lukjančukas | Mangirdas Mirauskas; Aleksandras Stepanovas |
| Netherlands | Sander van der Eijk | Rens Bluemink; Stefan De Groot |
| Poland | Damian Sylwestrzak | Adam Karasewicz; Bartosz Heinig |
| Scotland | Nick Walsh | Daniel McFarlane; Calum Spence |
| Serbia | Nenad Minaković | Nikola Borović; Boško Božović |
| Switzerland | Alessandro Dudic | Pascal Hirzel; Nicolas Müller |
| Venezuela | Alexis Herrera | Lubin Torrealba; Alberto Ponte |

=== VARs ===
- (Belgium) Jan Boterberg
- (Bulgaria) Dragomir Draganov
- (Croatia) Mario Zebec
- (Denmark) Jonas Hansen
- (England) Michael Salisbury
- (France) Bastien Deshepy
- (Germany) Søren Storks
- (Greece) Angelos Evangelou
- (Italy) Daniele Chiffi
- (Netherlands) Clay Ruperti
- (Poland) Piotr Lyasyk
- (Scotland) Andrew Dallas
- (Spain) Cesar Soto Grado
- (Switzerland) Lukas Fendrich

=== Support referees ===
- (Kazakhstan) Bulat Sariyev
- (Malta) Ishmael Barbara
- (North Macedonia) Igor Stojčevski
- (Slovakia) Michal Očenaš

== Squads ==
Players born on or after 1 January 2002 are eligible to participate. Each national team had to submit a squad of 23 players, three of whom had to be goalkeepers. If a player was injured or ill severely enough to prevent his participation in the tournament before his team's first match, he could be replaced by another player.

== Group stage ==
The schedule was unveiled on 16 October 2024. The detailed schedule with the qualified teams involved was confirmed shortly after the draw. The group winners and runners-up advanced to the knockout stage, which began with the quarter-finals.

All times are local, CEST (UTC+2).

=== Opening ceremony ===
The singer Tina performed at the opening ceremony, accompanied by 32 dancers. A further 100 performers helped complete the opening choreography. The program was directed by dancer and choreographer Miňo Kereš.

=== Tiebreakers ===
The ranking of teams in the group stage was determined as follows:

1. Points obtained in all group matches;
2. Points in head-to-head matches among tied teams;
3. Goal difference in head-to-head matches among tied teams;
4. Goals scored in head-to-head matches among tied teams;
5. If more than two teams were tied, and after applying all head-to-head criteria above, a subset of teams were still tied, all head-to-head criteria above were reapplied exclusively to this subset of teams;
6. Goal difference in all group matches;
7. Goals scored in all group matches;
8. Penalty shoot-out if only two teams had the same number of points, and they met in the last round of the group and were tied after applying all criteria above (not used if more than two teams had the same number of points, or if their rankings were not relevant for qualification for the next stage);
9. Disciplinary points
  - Yellow card: −1 point;
  - Indirect red card (second yellow card): −3 points;
  - Direct red card: −3 points;
10. UEFA coefficient for the qualifying round draw;
11. Drawing of lots.

=== Group A ===
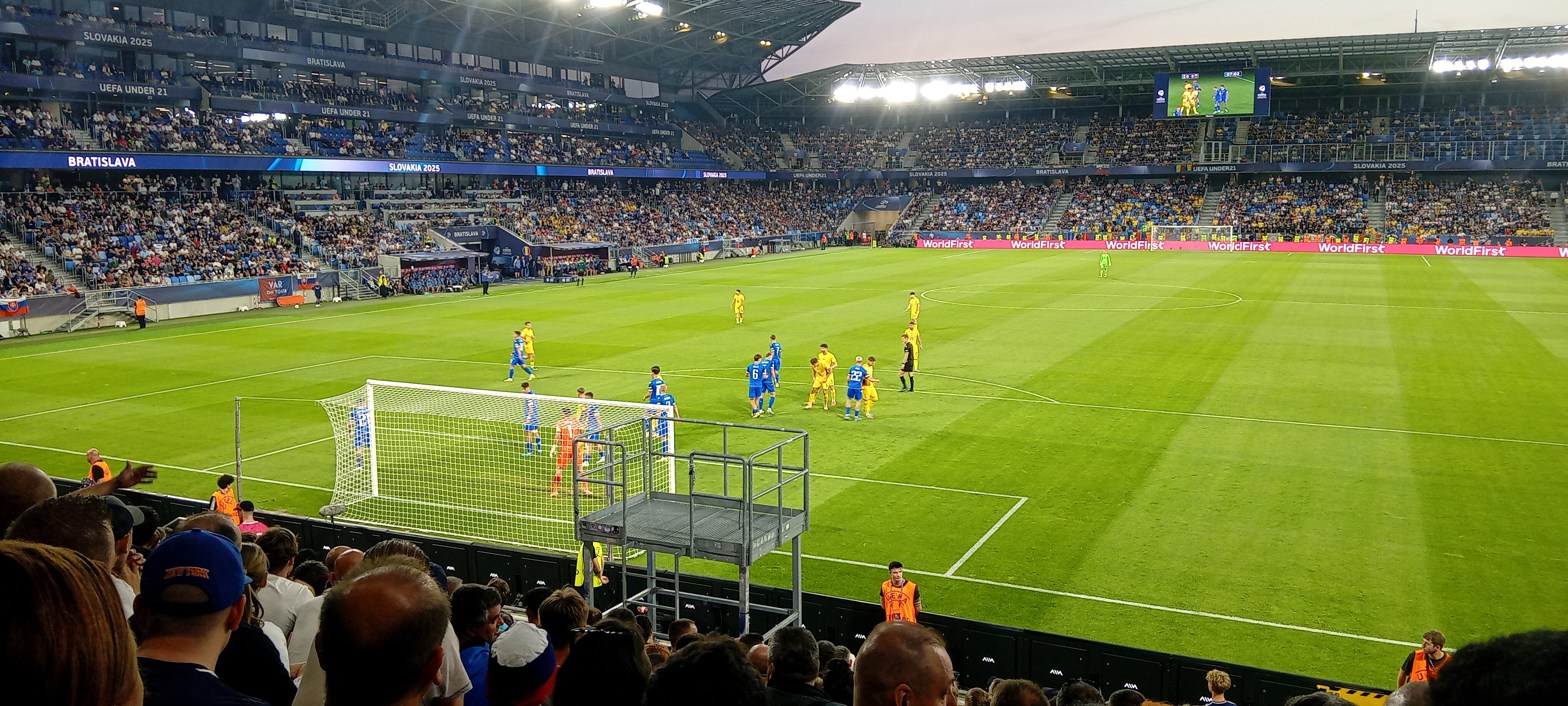
Slovakia vs Romania in Bratislava.

| Pos | Team | Pld | W | D | L | GF | GA | GD | Pts | Qualification |
|---|---|---|---|---|---|---|---|---|---|---|
| 1 | Spain | 3 | 2 | 1 | 0 | 6 | 4 | +2 | 7 | Knockout stage |
| 2 | Italy | 3 | 2 | 1 | 0 | 3 | 1 | +2 | 7 | Knockout stage |
| 3 | Slovakia (H) | 3 | 1 | 0 | 2 | 4 | 5 | −1 | 3 | |
| 4 | Romania | 3 | 0 | 0 | 3 | 2 | 5 | −3 | 0 | |

Source: UEFA
Rules for classification: Group stage tiebreakers
(H) Hosts
11 June 2025
18:00

| Slovakia | 2–3 | Spain |
|---|---|---|
| Kopásek 48'; Suslov 53' (pen.) | Report | Pubill 16'; Joseph 18'; Tárrega 90' |

National Football Stadium, Bratislava
Attendance: 19,964
Referee: Damian Sylwestrzak (Poland)
11 June 2025
21:00

| Italy | 1–0 | Romania |
|---|---|---|
| Baldanzi 26' | Report |

Anton Malatinský Stadium, Trnava
Attendance: 2,450
Referee: Vassilis Fotias (Greece)

14 June 2025
18:00

| Spain | 2−1 | Romania |
|---|---|---|
| Jauregizar 85'; Fernández 88' | Report | Munteanu 4' |

National Football Stadium, Bratislava
Attendance: 10,023
Referee: Sander van der Eijk (Netherlands)
14 June 2025
21:00

| Slovakia | 0–1 | Italy |
|---|---|---|
| | Report | Casadei 7' |

Anton Malatinský Stadium, Trnava
Attendance: 15,455
Referee: Nenad Minaković (Serbia)

17 June 2025
21:00

| Romania | 1–2 | Slovakia |
|---|---|---|
| Akdağ 67' | Report | Obert 11'; Suslov 57' |

National Football Stadium, Bratislava
Attendance: 17,058
Referee: Manfredas Lukjančukas (Lithuania)
17 June 2025
21:00

| Spain | 1–1 | Italy |
|---|---|---|
| Rodríguez 53' | Report | Pisilli 59' |

Anton Malatinský Stadium, Trnava
Attendance: 12,573
Referee: Nick Walsh (Scotland)

=== Group B ===
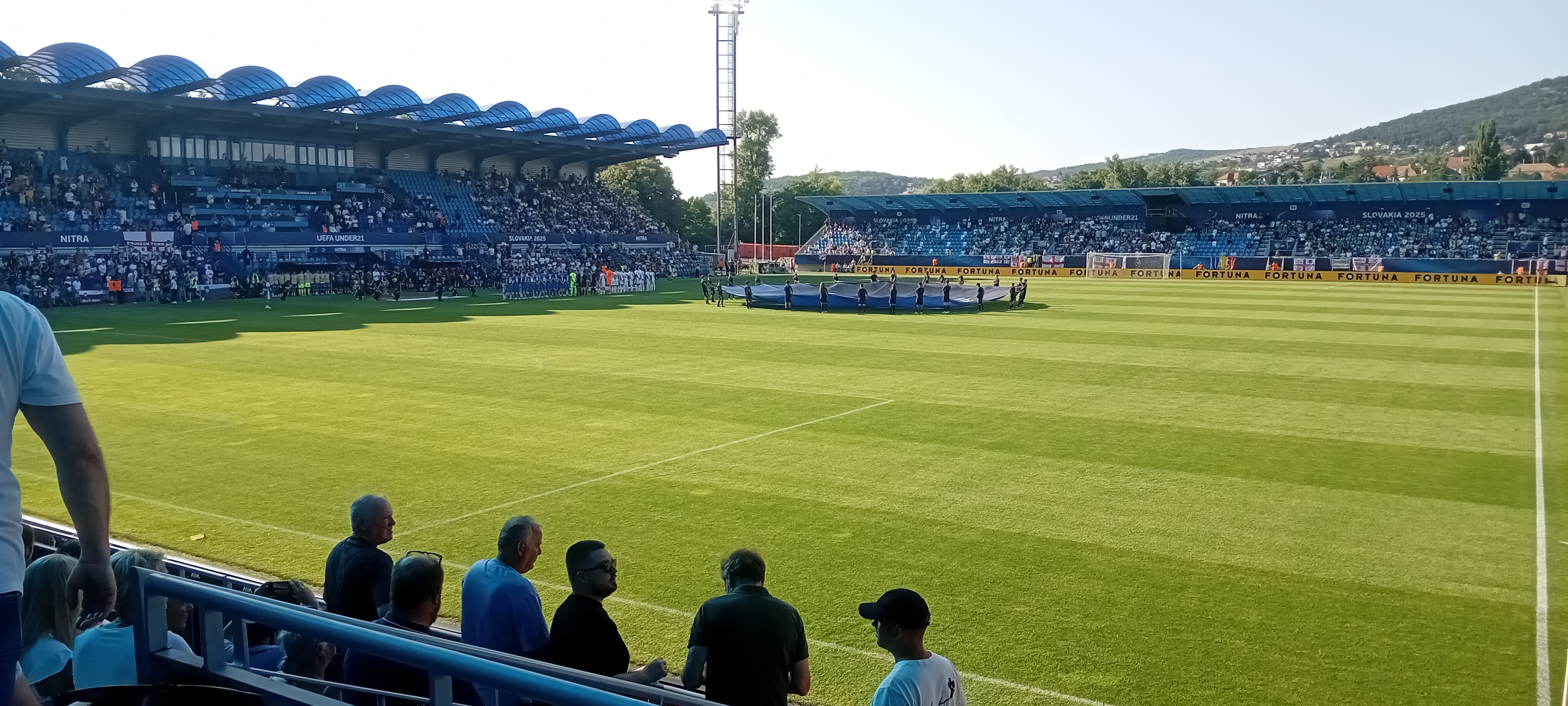
England vs Slovenia in Nitra.

| Pos | Team | Pld | W | D | L | GF | GA | GD | Pts | Qualification |
|---|---|---|---|---|---|---|---|---|---|---|
| 1 | Germany | 3 | 3 | 0 | 0 | 9 | 3 | +6 | 9 | Knockout stage |
| 2 | England | 3 | 1 | 1 | 1 | 4 | 3 | +1 | 4 | Knockout stage |
| 3 | Czech Republic | 3 | 1 | 0 | 2 | 5 | 7 | −2 | 3 | |
| 4 | Slovenia | 3 | 0 | 1 | 2 | 0 | 5 | −5 | 1 | |

Source: UEFA
Rules for classification: Group stage tiebreakers
12 June 2025
21:00

| Czech Republic | 1−3 | England |
|---|---|---|
| Fila 51' | Report | Elliott 39'; Rowe 48'; Cresswell 76' |

DAC Aréna, Dunajská Streda
Attendance: 8,087
Referee: Elchin Masiyev (Azerbaijan)
12 June 2025
21:00

| Germany | 3−0 | Slovenia |
|---|---|---|
| Woltemade 19', 42', 82' (pen.) | Report |

Nitra Stadium, Nitra
Attendance: 2,708
Referee: Jakob Sundberg (Denmark)

15 June 2025
18:00

| England | 0−0 | Slovenia |
|---|---|---|
| | Report |

Nitra Stadium, Nitra
Attendance: 5,217
Referee: Goga Kikacheishvili (Georgia)
15 June 2025
21:00

| Czech Republic | 2–4 | Germany |
|---|---|---|
| Arrey-Mbi 60' (o.g.); Spáčil 66' | Report | Tresoldi 34'; Nebel 41'; Woltemade 54'; Martel 58' |

DAC Aréna, Dunajská Streda
Attendance: 7,870
Referee: Alexis Herrera (Venezuela)

18 June 2025
21:00

| Slovenia | 0–2 | Czech Republic |
|---|---|---|
| | Report | Fila 48'; Sejk 59' |

DAC Aréna, Dunajská Streda
Attendance: 4,028
Referee: Simone Sozza (Italy)
18 June 2025
21:00

| England | 1–2 | Germany |
|---|---|---|
| Scott 76' | Report | Knauff 3'; Weiper 33' |

Nitra Stadium, Nitra
Attendance: 5,624
Referee: Sander van der Eijk (Netherlands)

=== Group C ===
| Pos | Team | Pld | W | D | L | GF | GA | GD | Pts | Qualification |
|---|---|---|---|---|---|---|---|---|---|---|
| 1 | Portugal | 3 | 2 | 1 | 0 | 9 | 0 | +9 | 7 | Knockout stage |
| 2 | France | 3 | 2 | 1 | 0 | 7 | 3 | +4 | 7 | Knockout stage |
| 3 | Georgia | 3 | 1 | 0 | 2 | 4 | 8 | −4 | 3 | |
| 4 | Poland | 3 | 0 | 0 | 3 | 2 | 11 | −9 | 0 | |

Source: UEFA
Rules for classification: Group stage tiebreakers
11 June 2025
21:00

| Portugal | 0–0 | France |
|---|---|---|
| | Report |

Sihoť Stadium, Trenčín
Attendance: 4,932
Referee: Manfredas Lukjančukas (Lithuania)
11 June 2025
21:00

| Poland | 1–2 | Georgia |
|---|---|---|
| Kałuziński 73' (pen.) | Report | Lominadze 55'; Gordeziani 90+4' |

MŠK Žilina Stadium, Žilina
Attendance: 2,218
Referee: Alessandro Dudic (Switzerland)

14 June 2025
21:00

| Portugal | 5–0 | Poland |
|---|---|---|
| Quenda 16', 24'; Araújo 30'; Bernardo 41'; Gomes 63' | Report |

Sihoť Stadium, Trenčín
Attendance: 4,469
Referee: Nick Walsh (Scotland)
14 June 2025
21:00

| France | 3–2 | Georgia |
|---|---|---|
| Tel 35' (pen.); Lepenant 89'; Barry 90+12' | Report | Abuashvili 76'; Sazonov 84' |

MŠK Žilina Stadium, Žilina
Attendance: 3,687
Referee: Jakob Sundberg (Denmark)

17 June 2025
18:00

| Georgia | 0–4 | Portugal |
|---|---|---|
| | Report | Pinheiro 24'; Quenda 62'; Gomes 87'; Araújo 90+5' (pen.) |

Sihoť Stadium, Trenčín
Attendance: 4,573
Referee: Elchin Masiyev (Azerbaijan)
17 June 2025
18:00

| France | 4–1 | Poland |
|---|---|---|
| Zézé 18'; Cissé 19', 29'; Abline 82' | Report | Mosór 61' |

MŠK Žilina Stadium, Žilina
Attendance: 7,288
Referee: Nenad Minaković (Serbia)

=== Group D ===
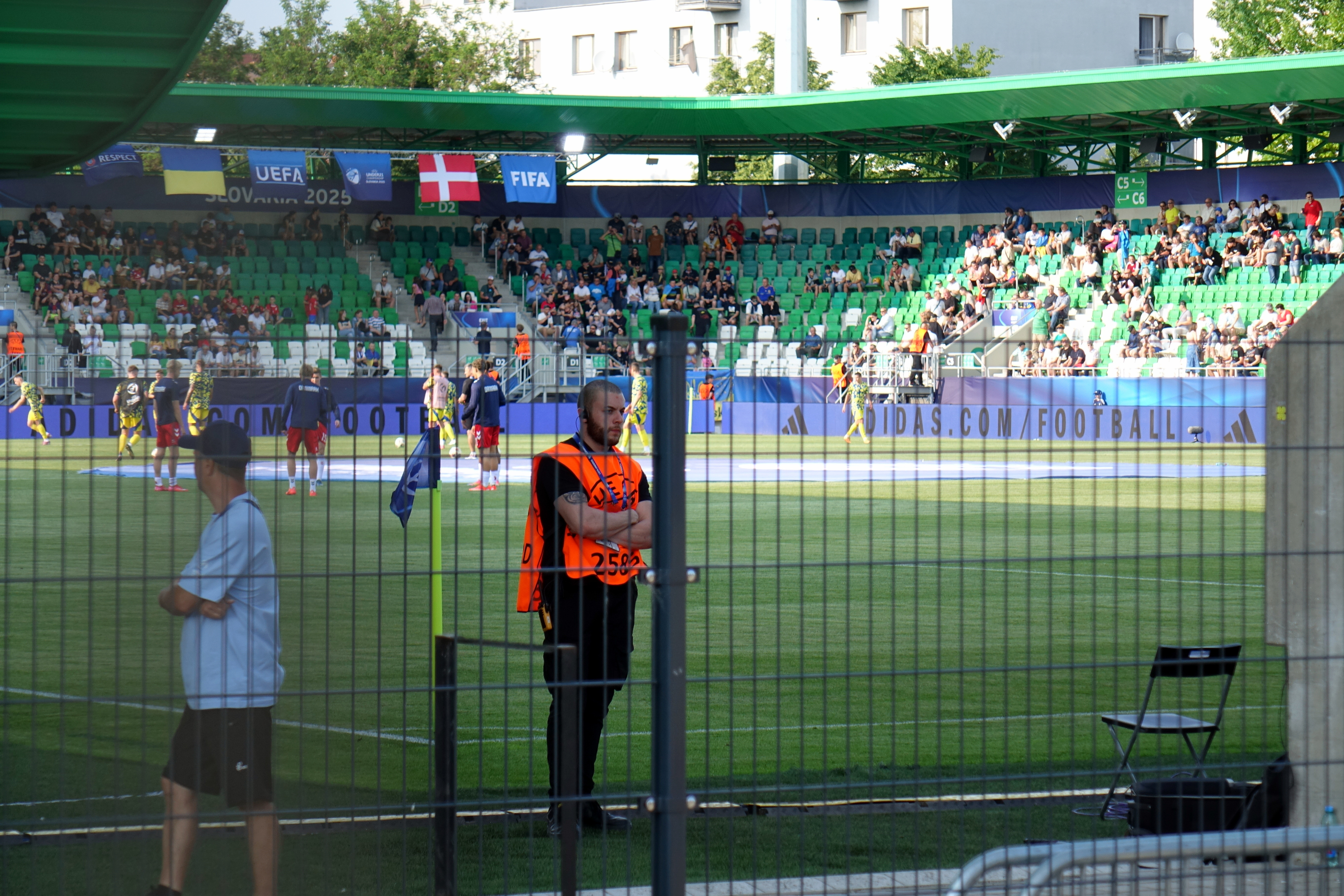
Ukraine v Denmark at Prešov.

| Pos | Team | Pld | W | D | L | GF | GA | GD | Pts | Qualification |
|---|---|---|---|---|---|---|---|---|---|---|
| 1 | Denmark | 3 | 2 | 1 | 0 | 7 | 5 | +2 | 7 | Knockout stage |
| 2 | Netherlands | 3 | 1 | 1 | 1 | 5 | 4 | +1 | 4 | Knockout stage |
| 3 | Ukraine | 3 | 1 | 0 | 2 | 4 | 5 | −1 | 3 | |
| 4 | Finland | 3 | 0 | 2 | 1 | 4 | 6 | −2 | 2 | |

Source: UEFA
Rules for classification: Group stage tiebreakers
12 June 2025
18:00

| Ukraine | 2–3 | Denmark |
|---|---|---|
| Voloshyn 22'; Braharu 78' | Report | Bischoff 62'; Bøving 81'; Osula 85' |

Tatran Arena, Prešov
Attendance: 5,458
Referee: Goga Kikacheishvili (Georgia)
12 June 2025
21:00

| Finland | 2−2 | Netherlands |
|---|---|---|
| Terho 25'; Keskinen 28' | Report | Valente 59'; Poku 90+3' |

Košice Football Arena, Košice
Attendance: 7,369
Referee: Alexis Herrera (Venezuela)

15 June 2025
18:00

| Finland | 0−2 | Ukraine |
|---|---|---|
| | Report | Vanat 28'; Braharu 49' |

Košice Football Arena, Košice
Attendance: 8,636
Referee: Alessandro Dudic (Switzerland)
15 June 2025
21:00

| Netherlands | 1–2 | Denmark |
|---|---|---|
| Provstgaard 19' (o.g.) | Report | Osula 35', 47' |

Tatran Arena, Prešov
Attendance: 5,484
Referee: Simone Sozza (Italy)

18 June 2025
18:00

| Denmark | 2–2 | Finland |
|---|---|---|
| Harder 10', 68' | Report | Skyttä 73'; Keskinen 82' |

Košice Football Arena, Košice
Attendance: 6,940
Referee: Damian Sylwestrzak (Poland)
18 June 2025
18:00

| Netherlands | 2–0 | Ukraine |
|---|---|---|
| Valente 34'; Van Bergen 57' | Report |

Tatran Arena, Prešov
Attendance: 5,216
Referee: Vassilis Fotias (Greece)

== Knockout stage ==
In the knockout stage, extra time and a penalty shoot-out were used to decide the winners if necessary.

=== Bracket ===
Quarter-finals
21 June – Trnava
Spain | 1
England | 3
21 June – Žilina
Portugal | 0
Netherlands | 1
22 June – Dunajská Streda
Germany (a.e.t.) | 3
Italy | 2
22 June – Prešov
Denmark | 2
France | 3

Semi-finals
25 June – Bratislava
England | 2
Netherlands | 1
25 June – Košice
Germany | 3
France | 0

Final
28 June – Bratislava
England (a.e.t.) | 3
Germany | 2

=== Quarter-finals ===
21 June 2025
18:00

| Portugal | 0–1 | Netherlands |
|---|---|---|
| | Report | Poku 84' |

MŠK Žilina Stadium, Žilina
Attendance: 7,117
Referee: Goga Kikacheishvili (Georgia)

21 June 2025
21:00

| Spain | 1–3 | England |
|---|---|---|
| Guerra 39' (pen.) | Report | McAtee 10'; Elliott 15'; Anderson 90+4' (pen.) |

Anton Malatinský Stadium, Trnava
Attendance: 8,247
Referee: Simone Sozza (Italy)

22 June 2025
18:00

| Denmark | 2–3 | France |
|---|---|---|
| Bischoff 18'; Sørensen 49' | Report | Cissé 44'; Merlin 84'; Tel 85' |

Tatran Arena, Prešov
Attendance: 5,513
Referee: Sander van der Eijk (Netherlands)

22 June 2025
21:00

| Germany | 3–2 (a.e.t.) | Italy |
|---|---|---|
| Woltemade 68'; Weiper 87'; Röhl 117' | Report | Koleosho 58'; Ambrosino 90+6' |

DAC Aréna, Dunajská Streda
Attendance: 6,503
Referee: Manfredas Lukjančukas (Lithuania)

=== Semi-finals ===
25 June 2025
18:00

| England | 2–1 | Netherlands |
|---|---|---|
| Elliott 63', 86' | Report | Ohio 72' |

National Football Stadium, Bratislava
Attendance: 14,719
Referee: Vassilis Fotias (Greece)

25 June 2025
21:00

| Germany | 3–0 | France |
|---|---|---|
| Weiper 8'; Woltemade 14'; Gruda 90+5' | Report |

Košice Football Arena, Košice
Attendance: 11,913
Referee: Nick Walsh (Scotland)

=== Final ===
28 June 2025
21:00

| England | 3–2 (a.e.t.) | Germany |
|---|---|---|
| Elliott 5'; Hutchinson 24'; Rowe 92' | Report | Weiper 45+1'; Nebel 61' |

Tehelné pole, Bratislava
Attendance: 19,153
Referee: Sander van der Eijk (Netherlands)

== Statistics ==
=== Goalscorers ===
There were 101 goals scored in 31 matches, for an average of 3.26 goals per match.

6 goals

- (Germany) Nick Woltemade

5 goals

- (England) Harvey Elliott

4 goals

- (Germany) Nelson Weiper

3 goals

- (Denmark) William Osula
- (France) Djaoui Cissé
- (Portugal) Geovany Quenda

2 goals

- (Czech Republic) Daniel Fila
- (Denmark) Clement Bischoff
- (Denmark) Conrad Harder
- (England) Jonathan Rowe
- (Finland) Topi Keskinen
- (France) Mathys Tel
- (Germany) Paul Nebel
- (Netherlands) Ernest Poku
- (Netherlands) Luciano Valente
- (Portugal) Henrique Araújo
- (Portugal) Rodrigo Gomes
- (Slovakia) Tomáš Suslov
- (Ukraine) Maksym Braharu

1 goal

- (Czech Republic) Václav Sejk
- (Czech Republic) Karel Spáčil
- (Denmark) William Bøving
- (Denmark) Oliver Sørensen
- (England) Elliot Anderson
- (England) Charlie Cresswell
- (England) Omari Hutchinson
- (England) James McAtee
- (England) Alex Scott
- (Finland) Naatan Skyttä
- (Finland) Casper Terho
- (France) Matthis Abline
- (France) Thierno Barry
- (France) Johann Lepenant
- (France) Quentin Merlin
- (France) Nathan Zézé
- (Georgia (country)) Giorgi Abuashvili
- (Georgia (country)) Vasilios Gordeziani
- (Georgia (country)) Nodar Lominadze
- (Georgia (country)) Saba Sazonov
- (Germany) Brajan Gruda
- (Germany) Ansgar Knauff
- (Germany) Eric Martel
- (Germany) Merlin Röhl
- (Germany) Nicolò Tresoldi
- (Italy) Giuseppe Ambrosino
- (Italy) Tommaso Baldanzi
- (Italy) Cesare Casadei
- (Italy) Luca Koleosho
- (Italy) Niccolò Pisilli
- (Netherlands) Thom van Bergen
- (Netherlands) Noah Ohio
- (Poland) Jakub Kałuziński
- (Poland) Ariel Mosór
- (Portugal) Paulo Bernardo
- (Portugal) Rodrigo Pinheiro
- (Romania) Ümit Akdağ
- (Romania) Louis Munteanu
- (Slovakia) Samuel Kopásek
- (Slovakia) Adam Obert
- (Spain) Roberto Fernández
- (Spain) Javi Guerra
- (Spain) Mikel Jauregizar
- (Spain) Mateo Joseph
- (Spain) Marc Pubill
- (Spain) Jesús Rodríguez
- (Spain) César Tárrega
- (Ukraine) Vladyslav Vanat
- (Ukraine) Nazar Voloshyn

1 own goal

- (Denmark) Oliver Provstgaard (against Netherlands)
- (Germany) Bright Arrey-Mbi (against Czech Republic)

=== Discipline ===
A player was automatically suspended for the next match for the following offences:

- Receiving a red card (red card suspensions could be extended for serious offences)
- Receiving two yellow cards in two matches; yellow cards expired after the completion of the quarter-finals (yellow card suspensions were not carried forward to any other future international matches)

The following suspensions were served during the tournament:

| Player | Offence(s) | Suspension(s) |
|---|---|---|
| (Romania) Vladislav Blanuta | (red card) in Group A vs Spain (matchday 2; 14 June) | Group A vs Slovakia (matchday 3; 17 June) |
| (Germany) Max Rosenfelder | (yellow card) in Group B vs Slovenia (matchday 1; 12 June); (yellow card) in Group B vs Czech Republic (matchday 2; 15 June) | Group B vs England (matchday 3; 18 June) |
| (Ukraine) Volodymyr Brazhko | (yellow card) (yellow-red card) in Group D vs Finland (matchday 2; 15 June) | Group D vs Netherlands (matchday 3; 18 June) |
| (Finland) Ville Koski | (yellow card) in Group D vs Netherlands (matchday 1; 12 June); (yellow card) in Group D vs Ukraine (matchday 2; 15 June) | Group B vs Denmark (matchday 3; 18 June) |
| (Georgia (country)) Lasha Odisharia | (red card) in Group C vs Portugal (matchday 3; 17 June) | Suspension served outside tournament |
| (Georgia (country)) Giorgi Kvernadze | (yellow card) in Group C vs Poland (matchday 1; 11 June); (yellow card) in Group C vs Portugal (matchday 3; 17 June) | Suspension served outside tournament |
| (Georgia (country)) Gizo Mamageishvili | (yellow card) in Group C vs Poland (matchday 1; 11 June); (yellow card) in Group C vs Portugal (matchday 3; 17 June) | Suspension served outside tournament |
| (Georgia (country)) Nodar Lominadze | (yellow card) in Group C vs France (matchday 2; 14 June); (yellow card) in Group C vs Portugal (matchday 3; 17 June) | Suspension served outside tournament |
| (Slovakia) Samuel Kopásek | (yellow card) in Group A vs Spain (matchday 1; 11 June); (yellow card) in Group A vs Romania (matchday 3; 17 June) | Suspension served outside tournament |
| (Romania) Ovidiu Perianu | (yellow card) in Group A vs Spain (matchday 2; 14 June); (yellow card) in Group A vs Slovakia (matchday 3; 17 June) | Suspension served outside tournament |
| (Netherlands) Youri Regeer | (red card) in Group D vs Ukraine (matchday 3; 18 June) | Quarter-finals vs Portugal (21 June) |
| (Slovenia) Srđan Kuzmić | (yellow card) in Group B vs Germany (matchday 1; 12 June); (yellow card) in Group B vs Czech Republic (matchday 3; 18 June) | Suspension served outside tournament |
| (Czech Republic) Patrik Vydra | (yellow card) in Group B vs Germany (matchday 2; 15 June); (yellow card) in Group B vs Slovenia (matchday 3; 18 June) | Suspension served outside tournament |
| (Czech Republic) Filip Vecheta | (yellow card) in Group B vs Germany (matchday 2; 15 June); (yellow card) in Group B vs Slovenia (matchday 3; 18 June) | Suspension served outside tournament |
| (Czech Republic) Josef Koželuh | (yellow card) in Group B vs Germany (matchday 2; 15 June); (yellow card) in Group B vs Slovenia (matchday 3; 18 June) | Suspension served outside tournament |
| (Netherlands) Ruben van Bommel | (yellow card) (yellow-red card) in Quarter-finals vs Portugal (21 June) | Semi-finals vs England (24 June) |
| (Netherlands) Devyne Rensch | (yellow card) in Group D vs Finland (matchday 1; 12 June); (yellow card) in Quarter-finals vs Portugal (21 June) | Semi-finals vs England (24 June) |
| (Netherlands) Kenneth Taylor | (yellow card) in Group D vs Denmark (matchday 2; 15 June); (yellow card) in Quarter-finals vs Portugal (21 June) | Semi-finals vs England (24 June) |
| (England) Tyler Morton | (yellow card) in Group B vs Slovenia (matchday 2; 15 June); (yellow card) in Quarter-finals vs Spain (21 June) | Semi-finals vs Netherlands (24 June) |
| (Spain) Rafa Marín | (red card) in Quarter-finals vs England (21 June) | Suspension served outside tournament |
| (Italy) Luca Koleosho | (yellow card) in Group A vs Slovakia (matchday 2; 14 June); (yellow card) in Quarter-finals vs Germany (22 June) | Suspension served outside tournament |
| (Italy) Wilfried Gnonto | (yellow card) (yellow-red card) in Quarter-finals vs Germany (22 June) | Suspension served outside tournament |
| (Italy) Mattia Zanotti | (yellow card) (yellow-red card) in Quarter-finals vs Germany (22 June) | Suspension served outside tournament |

=== Man of the match ===
The Man of the match award was given to player who was deemed as playing the best in the game. The award was given out for every game.

| Round | Team | Match | Team | Player |
|---|---|---|---|---|
| Group A | Slovakia | 2–3 | Spain | (Spain) César Tárrega |
| Group A | Italy | 1–0 | Romania | (Italy) Luca Koleosho |
| Group A | Spain | 2–1 | Romania | (Spain) Javi Guerra |
| Group A | Slovakia | 0–1 | Italy | (Italy) Cher Ndour |
| Group A | Romania | 1–2 | Slovakia | (Slovakia) Tomáš Suslov |
| Group A | Spain | 1–1 | Italy | (Spain) Raúl Moro |
| Group B | Czech Republic | 1–3 | England | (England) Tino Livramento |
| Group B | Germany | 3–0 | Slovenia | (Germany) Nick Woltemade |
| Group B | England | 0–0 | Slovenia | (England) Harvey Elliott |
| Group B | Czech Republic | 2–4 | Germany | (Germany) Nick Woltemade |
| Group B | England | 1–2 | Germany | (Germany) Ansgar Knauff |
| Group B | Slovenia | 0–2 | Czech Republic | (Czech Republic) Václav Sejk |
| Group C | Portugal | 0–0 | France | (France) Castello Lukeba |
| Group C | Poland | 1–2 | (Georgia (country)) Georgia | (Georgia (country)) Giorgi Maisuradze |
| Group C | Portugal | 5–0 | Poland | (Portugal) Geovany Quenda |
| Group C | France | 3–2 | (Georgia (country)) Georgia | (France) Mathys Tel |
| Group C | Georgia (Georgia (country)) | 0–4 | Portugal | (Portugal) Geovany Quenda |
| Group C | France | 4–1 | Poland | (France) Djaoui Cissé |
| Group D | Ukraine | 2–3 | Denmark | (Ukraine) Oleh Ocheretko |
| Group D | Finland | 2–2 | Netherlands | (Finland) Santeri Väänänen |
| Group D | Finland | 0–2 | Ukraine | (Ukraine) Vladyslav Vanat |
| Group D | Netherlands | 1–2 | Denmark | (Denmark) Clement Bischoff |
| Group D | Denmark | 2–2 | Finland | (Finland) Topi Keskinen |
| Group D | Netherlands | 2–0 | Ukraine | (Netherlands) Luciano Valente |
| Quarter-finals | Portugal | 0–1 | Netherlands | (Netherlands) Ian Maatsen |
| Quarter-finals | Spain | 1–3 | England | (England) James McAtee |
| Quarter-finals | Denmark | 2–3 | France | (France) Djaoui Cissé |
| Quarter-finals | Germany | 3–2 (a.e.t) | Italy | (Germany) Bright Arrey-Mbi |
| Semi-finals | England | 2–1 | Netherlands | (England) Harvey Elliott |
| Semi-finals | Germany | 3–0 | France | (Germany) Nick Woltemade |
| Final | England | 3–2 (a.e.t) | Germany | (England) James McAtee |

== Awards ==
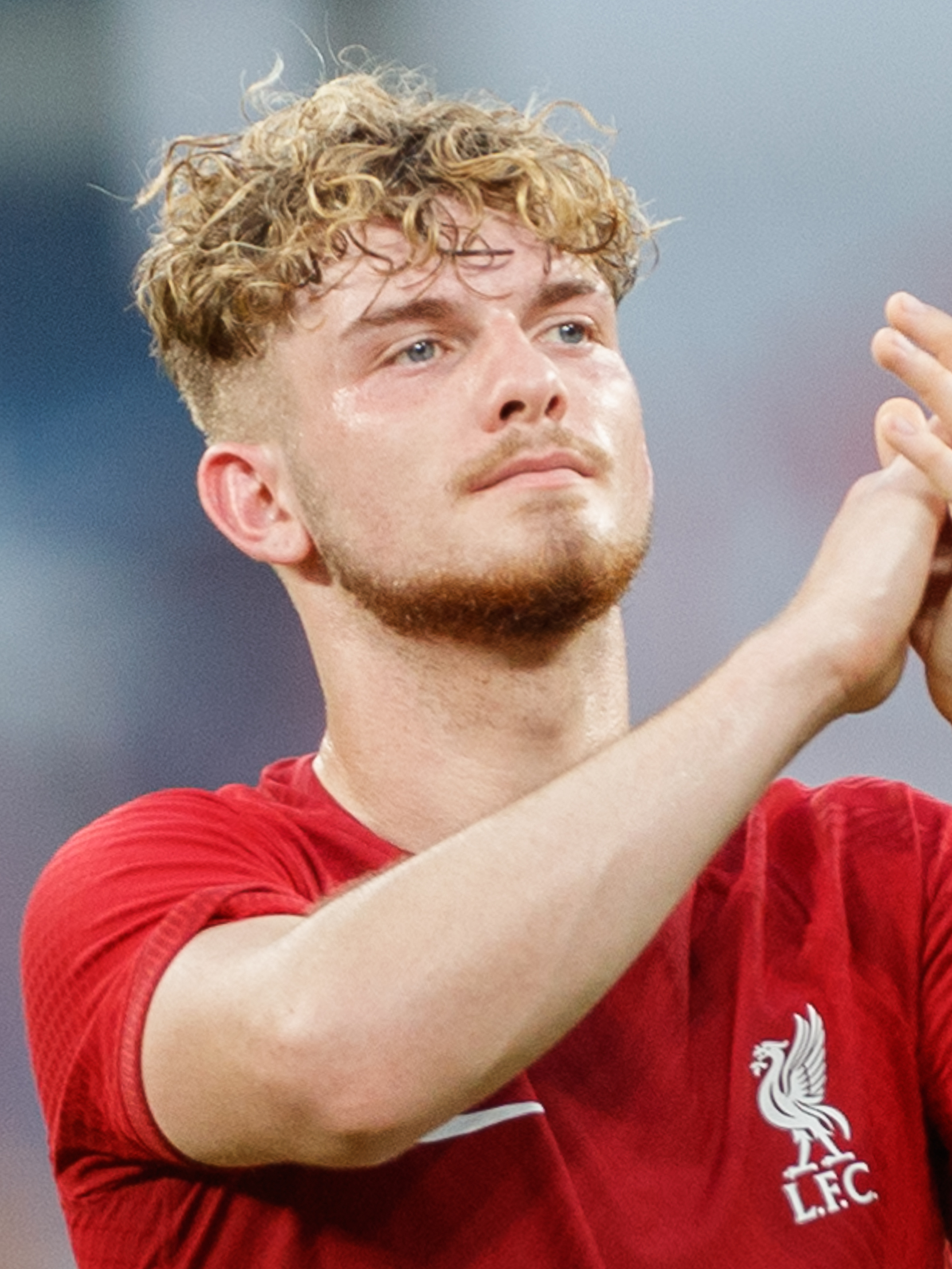
Harvey Elliott won Player of the Tournament.

The following awards were given at the conclusion of the tournament:

- Player of the Tournament: (England) Harvey Elliott
- Top Scorer: (Germany) Nick Woltemade (6 goals)

=== Team of the tournament ===
After the tournament the Under-21 Team of the Tournament was selected by the UEFA Technical Observers.

| Position | Player |
|---|---|
| Goalkeeper | (England) James Beadle |
| Defenders | (England) Tino Livramento |
| Defenders | (England) Charlie Cresswell |
| Defenders | (Germany) Bright Arrey-Mbi |
| Defenders | (France) Quentin Merlin |
| Midfielders | (England) Elliot Anderson |
| Midfielders | (Germany) Eric Martel |
| Midfielders | (England) James McAtee |
| Forwards | (England) Harvey Elliott |
| Forwards | (Germany) Nick Woltemade |
| Forwards | (Portugal) Geovany Quenda |
