= 2025 UEFA European Under-21 Championship qualification Group C =

Football tournament group stage

Group C of the 2025 UEFA European Under-21 Championship qualifying competition consists of six teams: the Netherlands, Sweden, Georgia, North Macedonia, Moldova, and Gibraltar. The composition of the nine groups in the qualifying group stage was decided by the draw held on 2 February 2023 at the UEFA headquarters in Nyon, Switzerland, with the teams seeded according to their coefficient ranking.

== Standings ==
Pos	Team	Pld	W	D	L	GF	GA	GD	Pts	Qualification	Netherlands	Georgia	Sweden	North Macedonia	Moldova	Gibraltar
1	Netherlands	10	10	0	0	32	3	+29	30	Final tournament	—	3–1	3–0	5–0	3–0	1–0
2	Georgia	10	6	1	3	14	10	+4	19	Play-offs	0–3	—	0–0	2–1	3–0	2–0
3	Sweden	10	5	2	3	25	10	+15	17		2–4	3–2	—	0–1	4–0	9–0
4	North Macedonia	10	4	0	6	8	15	−7	12		0–2	0–1	0–2	—	2–1	1–0
5	Moldova	10	2	1	7	7	20	−13	7		0–3	0–1	0–0	2–1	—	1–2
6	Gibraltar	10	1	0	9	3	31	−28	3		0–5	0–2	0–5	0–2	1–3	—

Source: UEFA
Rules for classification: Tiebreakers

== Matches ==
Times are CET/CEST, (Note: CEST (UTC+2) for dates between 26 March and 29 October 2023 and between 31 March and 27 October 2024, and CET (UTC+1) for all other dates.) as listed by UEFA (local times, if different, are in parentheses).

15 June 2023
13:00

Gibraltar	1–3	Moldova
Borge 3'	Report	Borș 27' (pen.); Răileanu 31', 67'

Victoria Stadium, Gibraltar
Attendance: 637
Referee: Jasmin Šabotić (Luxembourg)

19 June 2023
17:00

Gibraltar	0–5	Sweden
	Report	Prica 21'; Hasić 79'; Ayari 83'; Faraj 88'; Erabi 90+1'

Victoria Stadium, Gibraltar
Attendance: 259
Referee: Nathan Verboomen (Belgium)

6 September 2023
18:00 (20:00 GET)

Georgia	2–0	Gibraltar
O. Mamageishvili 10'; Gordeziani 17'	Report

Ramaz Shengelia Stadium, Kutaisi
Attendance: 5,413
Referee: Daniyar Sakhi (Kazakhstan)

8 September 2023
18:00

Sweden	0–1	North Macedonia
	Report	Nikolov 7'

Stadsparksvallen, Jönköping
Attendance: 2,431
Referee: David Dickinson (Scotland)
8 September 2023
18:30

Netherlands	3–0	Moldova
Proper 43'; Babadi 67'; Manhoef 73'	Report

Mandemakers Stadion, Waalwijk
Attendance: 3,094
Referee: Miloš Gigovic (Bosnia and Herzegovina)

12 September 2023
15:30

North Macedonia	0–2	Netherlands
	Report	Ohio 68'; Taylor 72' (pen.)

Petar Miloševski Training Centre, Skopje
Attendance: 408
Referee: Ishmael Barbara (Malta)
12 September 2023
18:00 (19:00 EEST)

Moldova	0–1	Georgia
	Report	Iobashvili 84'

Zimbru Stadium, Chișinău
Attendance: 1,278
Referee: Antti Munukka (Finland)

12 October 2023
16:00 (18:00 GET)

Georgia	0–3	Netherlands
	Report	Meijer 26', 45+1'; Ohio 57'

Batumi Stadium, Batumi
Attendance: 3,256
Referee: Alessandro Dudic (Switzerland)
13 October 2023
18:00

Sweden	4–0	Moldova
Vilhelmsson 8', 32'; Swedberg 19'; Bergvall 89'	Report

Falcon Alkoholfri Arena, Falkenberg
Attendance: 1,036
Referee: Trustin Farrugia Cann (Malta)

17 October 2023
16:00 (18:00 GET)

Georgia	0–0	Sweden
	Report

Batumi Stadium, Batumi
Attendance: 2,988
Referee: Michael Fabbri (Italy)
17 October 2023
17:00 (18:00 EEST)

Moldova	2–1	North Macedonia
Răileanu 55'; Lupan 85'	Report	Stankovski 60'

Zimbru Stadium, Chișinău
Attendance: 947
Referee: Robert Ian Jenkins (Wales)
17 October 2023
17:30

Gibraltar	0–5	Netherlands
	Report	Taylor 12'; Ohio 13'; Van Brederode 36'; Rensch 63'; Manhoef 65'

Victoria Stadium, Gibraltar
Attendance: 380
Referee: Menelaos Antoniou (Cyprus)

16 November 2023
13:00

North Macedonia	0–1	Georgia
	Report	Mamatsashvili 54'

Petar Miloševski Training Centre, Skopje
Attendance: 225
Referee: Rauf Jabarov (Azerbaijan)
16 November 2023
20:00

Netherlands	1–0	Gibraltar
Ohio 12'	Report

Yanmar Stadion, Almere
Attendance: 1,718
Referee: Luis Teixeira (Andorra)

20 November 2023
18:00

Sweden	2–4	Netherlands
Hansen 36' (o.g.); Persson 90+5'	Report	Hansen 39'; Van Bommel 64', 90+7'; Ohio 90+2'

Borås Arena, Borås
Attendance: 1,234
Referee: Rob Harvey (Republic of Ireland)
21 November 2023
17:00 (18:00 EEST)

Moldova	1–2	Gibraltar
Mișcov 80'	Report	Borge 29' (pen.); Carrington 57'

Zimbru Stadium, Chișinău
Attendance: 759
Referee: Ashot Ghaltakhchyan (Armenia)

21 March 2024
14:00

North Macedonia	1–0	Gibraltar
Abazi 52'	Report

Toše Proeski Arena, Skopje
Attendance: 471
Referee: Rob Hennessy (Republic of Ireland)

25 March 2024
19:30 (20:30 EET)

Moldova	0–3	Netherlands
	Report	Rensch 7'; Manhoef 45+1'; Van Bommel 49'

Zimbru Stadium, Chișinău
Attendance: 1,473
Referee: Henrik Nalbandyan (Armenia)
26 March 2024
14:00

Gibraltar	0–2	Georgia
	Report	Odisharia 22'; Kvernadze 75' (pen.)

Victoria Stadium, Gibraltar
Attendance: 211
Referee: Jakob Alexander Sundberg (Denmark)
26 March 2024
14:00

North Macedonia	0–2	Sweden
	Report	Rosengren 67'; Vilhelmsson 90+3'

Toše Proeski Arena, Skopje
Attendance: 458
Referee: Atilla Karaoğlan (Turkey)

5 September 2024
18:00 (20:00 GET)

Georgia	3–0	Moldova
O. Mamageishvili 14'; Kvernadze 49'; Abuashvili 72'	Report

Batumi Stadium, Batumi
Attendance: 5,250
Referee: Radoslav Gidzhenov (Bulgaria)
5 September 2024
20:00

Netherlands	5–0	North Macedonia
Regeer 2', 73'; Ohio 21'; Manhoef 60', 68'	Report

Yanmar Stadion, Almere
Attendance: 1,305
Referee: Ivar Orri Kristjansson (Iceland)
6 September 2024
18:00

Sweden	9–0	Gibraltar
Svensson 2'; Erabi 9', 17'; Bolin 31', 40'; Widell 59'; Caetano 70' (o.g.); Vinlöf 72', 80'	Report

Stadsparksvallen, Jönköping
Attendance: 1,382
Referee: Vitālijs Spasjoņņikovs (Latvia)

9 September 2024
13:00

Gibraltar	0–2	North Macedonia
	Report	Krstevski 24'; Ademi 42'

Europa Point Stadium, Gibraltar
Attendance: 178
Referee: Patrik Kolarić (Croatia)
9 September 2024
20:00

Netherlands	3–1	Georgia
Emegha 4', 18'; Ohio 71'	Report	O. Mamageishvili 30'

Covebo Stadion - De Koel, Venlo
Attendance: 3,458
Referee: Robert Schröder (Germany)
10 September 2024
15:00 (16:00 EEST)

Moldova	0–0	Sweden
	Report

Nisporeni Stadium, Nisporeni
Attendance: 2,070
Referee: Sayat Karabayev (Kazakhstan)

10 October 2024
18:00

Sweden	3–2	Georgia
Ondrejka 23'; Swedberg 38'; Erabi 50'	Report	Lominadze 12'; Dovin 51' (o.g.)

Stadsparksvallen, Jönköping
Attendance: 1,620
Referee: Iwan Arwel Griffith (Wales)
11 October 2024
14:00

North Macedonia	2–1	Moldova
Feta 11'; Kamberi 90+4'	Report	Răileanu 90+5'

Petar Miloševski Training Centre, Skopje
Attendance: 280
Referee: Martin Dohal (Slovakia)

14 October 2024
18:45

Netherlands	3–0	Sweden
Emegha 2'; van den Berg 18'; Eile 65' (o.g.)	Report

Goffertstadion, Nijmegen
Attendance: 7,149
Referee: Robert Jones (England)
15 October 2024
18:00

Georgia	2–1	North Macedonia
Gordeziani 61'; Lominadze 71'	Report	Isaki 52'

Ramaz Shengelia Stadium, Kutaisi
Attendance: 3,202
Referee: Viktor Shimusik (Belarus)

== Goalscorers ==
There have been 89 goals scored in 30 matches, for an average of 2.97 goals per match.

7 goals

- (Netherlands) Noah Ohio

5 goals

- (Netherlands) Million Manhoef

4 goals

- (Moldova) Vlad Răileanu
- (Sweden) Jusef Erabi

3 goals

- (Netherlands) Emanuel Emegha
- (Netherlands) Ruben van Bommel
- (Georgia (country)) Otar Mamageishvili
- (Sweden) Oscar Vilhelmsson

2 goals

- (Georgia (country)) Vasilios Gordeziani
- (Georgia (country)) Giorgi Kvernadze
- (Georgia (country)) Nodar Lominadze
- (Gibraltar) Dylan Borge
- (Netherlands) Bjorn Meijer
- (Netherlands) Devyne Rensch
- (Netherlands) Kenneth Taylor
- (Netherlands) Youri Regeer
- (Sweden) Hugo Bolin
- (Sweden) Matteo Pérez Vinlöf
- (Sweden) Williot Swedberg

1 goal

- (Georgia (country)) Jaduli Iobashvili
- (Georgia (country)) Saba Mamatsashvili
- (Georgia (country)) Lasha Odisharia
- (Georgia (country)) Giorgi Abuashvili
- (Gibraltar) Tayler Carrington
- (Moldova) Ion Borș
- (Moldova) Mihai Lupan
- (Moldova) Serghei Mișcov
- (Netherlands) Isaac Babadi
- (Netherlands) Sontje Hansen
- (Netherlands) Dirk Proper
- (Netherlands) Myron van Brederode
- (Netherlands) Rav van den Berg
- (North Macedonia) Luan Abazi
- (North Macedonia) Fiton Ademi
- (North Macedonia) Behar Feta
- (North Macedonia) Fisnik Isaki
- (North Macedonia) Bekim Kamberi
- (North Macedonia) Vane Krstevski
- (North Macedonia) Ivan Nikolov
- (North Macedonia) Luka Stankovski
- (Sweden) Yasin Ayari
- (Sweden) Lucas Bergvall
- (Sweden) Omar Faraj
- (Sweden) Emin Hasić
- (Sweden) Jacob Ondrejka
- (Sweden) Joakim Persson
- (Sweden) Tim Prica
- (Sweden) Otto Rosengren
- (Sweden) Daniel Svensson
- (Sweden) Casper Widell

1 own goal

- (Gibraltar) James Caetano (against Sweden)
- (Netherlands) Sontje Hansen (against Sweden)
- (Sweden) Oliver Dovin (against Georgia)
- (Sweden) Noah Eile (against Netherlands)
