= Iobashvili =

Iobashvili is a surname. Notable people with the surname include:

- Jaduli Iobashvili
- Nino Iobashvili
