= Giorgi Abuashvili =

Georgian footballer (born 2003)

Personal information
- Date of birth: 8 February 2003 (age 23)
- Place of birth: Tbilisi, Georgia
- Height: 1.75 m (5 ft 9 in)
- Position: Forward

Team information
- Current team: FC Metz (on loan from Kolkheti 1913)
- Number: 9

Youth career
- Dinamo Tbilisi

Senior career*
Years	Team	Apps	(Gls)
2019–2021	Dinamo Tbilisi	5	(0)
2021–2023	Porto B	5	(0)
2023–2024	Petrolul Ploiești	3	(0)
2024–	Kolkheti 1913	51	(18)
2025–	→ Metz (loan)	23	(2)

International career^{‡}
2019–2020	Georgia U17	6	(1)
2021	Georgia U19	5	(1)
2022–2025	Georgia U21	19	(3)
2025–	Georgia	2	(0)
- * Club domestic league appearances and goals as of 19 May 2026 ‡ National team caps and goals as of 18 November 2025

Giorgi Abuashvili (Georgian: გიორგი აბუაშვილი; born 8 February 2003) is a Georgian professional footballer who plays as a forward for Ligue 2 club Metz, on loan from Erovnuli Liga club Kolkheti 1913, and the Georgia national team.

Abuashvili has won the Erovnuli Liga and Supercup with Dinamo Tbilisi and represented his country in the national youth teams. Following the 2024 season, he was named in the Erovnuli Liga Team of the Year.

== Club career ==
Abuashvili started his career at Dinamo Tbilisi academy. Following several years at youth teams, the 16-year-old forward made his top-league debut in a 2–1 win over WIT Georgia on 16 June 2019. As a member of the squad, he won the champion's titles in 2019 and 2020.

In July 2021, Abuashvili signed a five-year contract with Portuguese club Porto, but he never got a chance to play for the senior team. Instead, he represented the youth team in the 2nd division and U19s who finished as runners-up in 2022.

Due to lack of playing time, Abuashvili moved to Romanian side Petrolul in August 2023. In total, he made five appearances for the team, scoring once in a 2–0 cup win over Cindia on 31 October 2023.

In early February 2024, the contract was terminated by mutual agreement which allowed Abuashvili to sign for Georgian club Kolkheti 1913 who had just earned promotion to the top tier. As he became a regular of the starting line-up, Abuashvili showed his goalscoring abilities as well. He netted in ten league matches with the first being against Samtredia on 26 April. Besides, Abuashvili scored three times in the cup campaign, including an extra-time brace against Gareji, helping the team reach the semifinals for a second successive season.

At the end of this season, Abuashvili became the team topscorer with 13 goals in both competitions combined. He was named Player of the Month by Erovnuli Liga sponsors Crystalbet in August 2024 and subsequently included in Team of the Season at an awards ceremony organized by the Georgian Football Federation in December.

On 17 July 2025, he was loaned by Kolkheti 1913 to Ligue 1 side FC Metz.

== International career ==
Abuashvili has played for each of the national youth teams. In 2017, he was called up to U15s for a four-team tournament held in Tbilisi and to U16s for friendly matches against Azerbaijan. The next autumn, Abuashvili joined the U17 team for 2019 European Championship qualifiers and a year later captained them in the 2020 European Championship 1st qualifying round against Portugal.

Abuashvili represented U19s for 2022 European Championship elite round, scoring against Romania as the team failed to advance to the final round.

His first goal for the under-21 team came in a friendly 2–1 loss to Turkey on 22 March 2024. Abuashvili made a significant contribution to U21s' successful 2025 UEFA European Championship qualifying campaign by taking part in 11 of the twelve matches. He sealed a 3–0 home win over Moldova on 5 September 2024. In a return play-off leg against Croatia on 19 November 2024, he converted from the spot in penalty shootout, which sent Georgia to the final stages of the competition.

Abuashvili played in all three Euro Under-21 games. As a substitute, he scored a leveller and later provided an assist against France, which earned him the highest rating point from Flashcore.

== Career statistics ==
=== Club ===
As of 17 May 2026

Appearances and goals by club, season and competition
Club	Season	League			National cup		Continental		Other		Total	
Club	Season	Division	Apps	Goals	Apps	Goals	Apps	Goals	Apps	Goals	Apps	Goals
Dinamo Tbilisi	2019	Erovnuli Liga	1	0	1	0	—		—		2	0
Dinamo Tbilisi	2020	Erovnuli Liga	0	0	—		—		—		0	0
Dinamo Tbilisi	2021	Erovnuli Liga	4	0	—		—		—		4	0
Dinamo Tbilisi	Total		5	0	1	0	0	0	0	0	6	0
Porto B	2021–22	Segunda Liga	0	0	—		—		—		0	0
Porto B	2022–23	Segunda Liga	5	0	—		—		—		5	0
Porto B	2023–24	Segunda Liga	0	0	—		—		—		0	0
Porto B	Total		5	0	0	0	0	0	0	0	5	0
Petrolul	2023–24	Liga 1	3	0	2	1	—		—		5	1
Kolkheti 1913	2024	Erovnuli Liga	33	10	4	3	—		—		37	13
Kolkheti 1913	2025	Erovnuli Liga	18	8	0	0	—		—		18	8
Kolkheti 1913	Total		51	18	4	3	0	0	0	0	55	21
Metz (loan)	2025–26	Ligue 1	23	2	1	0	—		—		24	2
Career total			81	17	8	4	0	0	0	0	89	21

=== International ===
As of match played 18 November 2025

Appearances and goals by national team and year
National team	Year	Apps	Goals
Georgia	2025	2	0
Total		2	0

== Honours ==
Dinamo Tbilisi

- Erovnuli Liga: 2019, 2020
- Georgian Super Cup: 2021

Individual

- Crystalsport Erovnuli Liga Player of the Month: August 2024
- Erovnuli Liga Team of the Year: 2024
