= Maroš Molnár =

Slovakian fitness coach and athlete

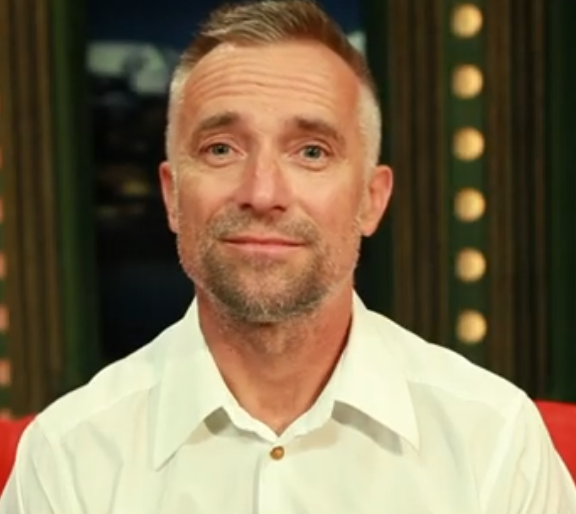
- On Show Jana Krause in 2023
- Born: February 28, 1973 (age 53); Žiar nad Hronom, Czechoslovakia
- Occupation: fitness coach

Maroš Molnár (born February 28, 1973) is a Slovak professional fitness coach and former track and field athlete. Molnár is currently working as a fitness head coach at the international EMPIRE Tennis Academy in Trnava, Slovakia.

== University ==
Maroš Molnár studied Physical Education and Biology at The Faculty of Physical Education and Sports of Comenius University in Bratislava, Slovakia. He was coached by Miroslav Vavák and Eugen Laco there and run 400 metres.
