= Rodrigo Pinheiro =

Portuguese footballer

Personal information
- Full name: Rodrigo Pinheiro Ferreira
- Date of birth: 28 August 2002 (age 24)
- Place of birth: Guimarães, Portugal
- Height: 1.83 m (6 ft 0 in)
- Positions: Right-back; left-back

Team information
- Current team: Famalicão
- Number: 17

Youth career
- 2011–2017: Vitória SC
- 2017–: Porto

Senior career*
| Years | Team | Apps | (Gls) |
| 2019–2024 | Porto B | 97 | (3) |
| 2024– | Famalicão | 58 | (3) |

International career^{‡}
| 2017 | Portugal U15 | 3 | (0) |
| 2019 | Portugal U18 | 6 | (0) |
| 2021 | Portugal U20 | 2 | (0) |
| 2024–2025 | Portugal U21 | 7 | (1) |
- * Club domestic league appearances and goals as of 25 May 2026 ‡ National team caps and goals as of 12 November 2025

Rodrigo Pinheiro Ferreira (born 28 August 2002) is a Portuguese professional footballer who plays as a right-back for Primeira Liga club Famalicão.

== Club career ==
Pinheiro made his senior debut for Porto B on 11 August 2019, starting in a 2–0 away loss at Sporting Covilhã in the LigaPro.

Pinheiro scored his first senior goal for Porto B on 28 December 2022, the opener in a 4–0 home victory over Farense, in the Liga Portugal 2.

== Career statistics ==
=== Club ===
As of match played 16 September 2023

Appearances and goals by club, season and competition
| Club | Season | League | | | National cup | | League cup | | Continental | | Total | |
| Club | Season | Division | Apps | Goals | Apps | Goals | Apps | Goals | Apps | Goals | Apps | Goals |
|---|---|---|---|---|---|---|---|---|---|---|---|---|
| Porto B | 2019–20 | LigaPro | 2 | 0 | — | | — | | — | | 2 | 0 |
| Porto B | 2020–21 | Liga Portugal 2 | 11 | 0 | — | | — | | — | | 11 | 0 |
| Porto B | 2021–22 | Liga Portugal 2 | 25 | 0 | — | | — | | — | | 25 | 0 |
| Porto B | 2022–23 | Liga Portugal 2 | 27 | 1 | — | | — | | — | | 27 | 1 |
| Porto B | 2023–24 | Liga Portugal 2 | 5 | 0 | — | | — | | — | | 5 | 0 |
| Porto B | Total | | 70 | 1 | — | | — | | — | | 70 | 1 |
| Career total | | | 70 | 1 | — | | — | | — | | 70 | 1 |
