= Lasha Odisharia =

Georgian footballer (born 2002)

Personal information
- Date of birth: 23 October 2002 (age 24)
- Place of birth: Georgia
- Height: 1.84 m (6 ft 0 in)
- Position: Midfielder

Team information
- Current team: RFS
- Number: 8

Youth career
- Salkhino Martvili
- Dinamo Tbilisi academy

Senior career*
Years	Team	Apps	(Gls)
2020–2023	Dinamo Tbilisi	27	(3)
2021	→ Merani Martvili (loan)	10	(1)
2021–2023	Dinamo Tbilisi II	44	(10)
2024–	RFS	68	(3)
2024	RFS II	1	(0)

International career^{‡}
2023–2025	Georgia U21	20	(1)
- * Club domestic league appearances and goals as of 12 November 2026 ‡ National team caps and goals as of 18 June 2025

Lasha Odisharia (Georgian: ლაშა ოდიშარია, born 23 October 2002) is a Georgian professional footballer who plays as a midfielder for Latvian Higher League club RFS.

He is the winner of Georgian Erovnuli Liga with Dinamo Tbilisi. In 2024, he won the Latvian Cup and national championship with RFS.

== Club career ==
Odisharia spent first ten years of his football career at Salkhino's academy in Martvili where he played as a forward. Since age 16, Odisharia has been playing as a winger on both flanks.

After representing Merani Martvili at U17 level, Odisharia was signed by Dinamo Tbilisi for their reserve team. Loaned for six months back to Merani, Odisharia took part in ten games in the 2nd division during the 2021 season. On 16 April, he netted his first official goal in a 2–1 loss to WIT Georgia. On 2 October 2022, Odisharia made a debut for the senior team in a goalless draw against Torpedo Kutaisi. He contributed to Dinamo's winning season with seven league appearances and one goal.

During the 2024 winter transfer window, Odisharia signed a three-year contract with Latvian champions Rigas FS. The club achieved the double this season, first winning the national cup on 30 October 2024, followed by the league trophy five days later.

On 3 October 2024, Odisharia opened his goal account in European competitions by scoring an equalizer in a UEFA Europa League 2–2 draw against Galatasaray.

== International career ==
Odisharia featured in all ten matches of Georgia U21's 2025 UEFA Championship qualifying campaign in 2023–24. As the team secured a play-off spot against Croatia, Odisharia scored against Gibraltar and provided four assists.

== Career statistics ==
As of 25 May 2026

Appearances and goals by club, season and competition
Club	Season	League			National cup (Note: Includes Georgian Cup, Latvian Cup)		Continental		Other		Total	
Club	Season	Division	Apps	Goals	Apps	Goals	Apps	Goals	Apps	Goals	Apps	Goals
Merani Martvili	2021	Erovnuli Liga 2	10	1	—		—		—		10	1
Dinamo Tbilisi-2	2022	Erovnuli Liga 2	14	2	2	0	—		—		16	2
Dinamo Tbilisi	2022	Erovnuli Liga	7	1	1	0	—		—		8	1
Dinamo Tbilisi	2023	Erovnuli Liga	20	2	2	1	1 (Note: Appearance in UEFA Conference League)	0	1 (Note: Appearance in Georgian Super Cup)	0	24	3
Dinamo Tbilisi	Total		27	3	3	1	1	0	1	0	32	4
RFS	2024	Latvian Higher League	24	2	3	0	9 (Note: Three appearances in UEFA Champions League, six appearances in UEFA Europa League)	1	1 (Note: Appearance in Latvian Supercup)	0	37	3
RFS	2025	Latvian Higher League	13	1	0	0	—		1	0	14	1
RFS	2026	Latvian Higher League	8	0	0	0	—		—		8	0
RFS	Total		45	3	3	0	9	1	2	0	59	4
Career total			96	9	8	1	10	1	3	0	117	11

== Honours ==
Dinamo Tbilisi

- Erovnuli Liga: 2022
- Georgian Super Cup: 2023

Dinamo 2 Tbilisi

- Liga 3: 2022
- Liga 4: 2021

RFS

- Latvian Higher League: 2024, 2026
- Latvian Cup: 2024
- Latvian Supercup: 2025
