= Jaduli Iobashvili =

Georgian footballer (born 2004)

Personal information
- Date of birth: 1 January 2004 (age 22)
- Place of birth: Chiatura, Georgia
- Height: 1.90 m (6 ft 3 in)
- Position: Forward

Team information
- Current team: Telavi
- Number: 9

Youth career
- 2015–2020: Dinamo Tbilisi

Senior career*
Years	Team	Apps	(Gls)
2021–	Dinamo Tbilisi	23	(2)
2023–2024	Dinamo Tbilisi-2	34	(10)
2025	→ Telavi (loan)	19	(4)
2026–	Telavi	15	(2)

International career^{‡}
2019–2021	Georgia U17	8	(1)
2022–2023	Georgia U19	8	(1)
2024–	Georgia U21	5	(1)
- * Club domestic league appearances and goals as of 11 July 2026 ‡ National team caps and goals as of 2 May 2025

Jaduli Iobashvili (Georgian: ჯადული იობაშვილი; born 1 January 2004) is a Georgian professional footballer who plays as a striker for Erovnuli Liga club Telavi.

He has won the Erovnuli Liga and Supercup and represented his country in the national youth teams.

== Club career ==
Iobashvili joined Dinamo Tbilisi at the age of 11 and played for their all youth teams before making his debut for the senior team in a 3–2 win over Locomotive on 4 December 2021. He opened his goal-scoring account two years later with an injury-time winner against Shukura. Iobashvili was a member of the squad that won the league in December 2022, followed by a Supercup title seven months later.

Iobashvili also played for Dinamo's reserve team in the 2nd division scoring ten times in 34 league appearances. After their coach Valery Gagua was appointed at Telavi in January 2025, Iobashvili followed him as a loanee.

== International career ==
Iobashvili has played for each of Georgia's youth teams. At the age of 15, he was called up to the national U17 team for two friendlies against Switzerland in May 2019. Two years later, Iobashvili joined the U19s for both rounds of their qualifying campaign. He netted twice in sixteen matches for these two teams combined.

As a member of the U21 team, Iobashvili scored a winner against Moldova on 12 September 2023 to help his team pick up three points and eventually reach play-offs, which paved the way for the final stage of the championship.

== Career statistics ==
As of 23 June 2026

Appearances and goals by club, season and competition
Club	Season	League			National cup		European		Other		Total	
Club	Season	Division	Apps	Goals	Apps	Goals	Apps	Goals	Apps	Goals	Apps	Goals
Dinamo Tbilisi	2021	Erovnuli Liga	1	0	—		—		—		1	0
Dinamo Tbilisi	2022	Erovnuli Liga	—		—		—		—		0	0
Dinamo Tbilisi	2023	Erovnuli Liga	7	1	1	0	—		1 (Note: Appearances in Georgian Super Cup)	0	9	1
Dinamo Tbilisi	2024	Erovnuli Liga	15	1	—		2 (Note: Appearances in UEFA Conference League qualifiers)	0	1	0	18	1
Dinamo Tbilisi	Total		23	2	1	0	2	0	2	0	28	2
Dinamo Tbilisi-2	2022	Erovnuli Liga 2	—		2	1	—		—		2	1
Dinamo Tbilisi-2	2023	Erovnuli Liga 2	19	8	–		—		—		19	8
Dinamo Tbilisi-2	2024	Erovnuli Liga 2	15	2	2	1	—		—		17	3
Dinamo Tbilisi-2	Total		34	10	4	2	0	0	0	0	38	12
Telavi (loan)	2025	Erovnuli Liga	19	4	0	0	—		—		19	4
Telavi	2026	Erovnuli Liga 2	15	2	0	0	—		—		15	2
Career total			91	18	5	2	2	0	2	0	100	20

== Honours ==
Dinamo Tbilisi

- Erovnuli Liga: 2022
- Georgian Super Cup: 2023
