= Northern Ireland national under-21 football team records and statistics =

This page details Northern Ireland national under-21 football team records and statistics; the most capped players, the players with the most goals, and Northern Ireland under-21's match record by opponent.

== Player records ==
=== Most appearances ===
Players still active are highlighted in green

Last updated after the match against Greece on 6 October 2026.

Rank	Player	Year(s)	U-21 Caps	U-21 Goals	First Cap	Last Cap
1	Liam Donnelly	2012–2018	24	5	13 November 2012 vs. (England)	16 October 2018 vs. (Slovakia)
2	Sean Friars	1998–2001	21	2	21 April 1998 vs. (Switzerland)	5 June 2001 vs. (Czech Republic)
2	Caolan Boyd-Munce	2017–2022	21	0	25 March 2019 vs. (Mexico)	25 September 2022 vs. (Scotland)
4	Kofi Balmer	2019–2022	20	0	22 March 2019 vs. (Bulgaria)	4 June 2022 vs. (Spain)
4	Ethan Galbraith	2019–2022	20	1	22 March 2019 vs. (Bulgaria)	7 June 2022 vs. (Lithuania)
4	Aaron Donnelly	2021–2024	20	0	2 June 2021 vs. (Scotland)	15 October 2024 vs. (Luxembourg)
4	Darren Robinson	2023–2026	20	0	7 September 2023 vs. (Luxembourg)	6 October 2026 vs. (Greece)
8	Terry McFlynn	2000–2003	19	2	28 March 2000 vs. (Malta)	10 October 2003 vs. (Greece)
8	Rory McArdle	2006–2008	19	1	6 February 2006 vs. (Israel)	26 March 2008 vs. (Romania)
8	Thomas Stewart	2006–2008	19	4	6 February 2006 vs. (Israel)	26 March 2008 vs. (Romania)
11	Chris Casement	2007–2009	18	2	6 February 2007 vs. (Wales)	17 November 2009 vs. (Czech Republic)
11	Cameron Dummigan	2014–2018	18	0	9 September 2014 vs. (Serbia)	16 October 2018 vs. (Slovakia)
11	Alfie McCalmont	2019–2022	18	3	25 March 2019 vs. (Mexico)	25 September 2022 vs. (Scotland)
14	Jeff Whitley	1998–2000	17	1	21 April 1998 vs. (Switzerland)	10 October 2000 vs. (Iceland)
14	Ciarán Toner	2000–2003	17	1	28 March 2000 vs. (Malta)	1 April 2003 vs. (Greece)
14	Josh Magennis	2009–2012	17	4	11 August 2009 vs. (Portugal)	13 November 2012 vs. (England)
14	David Parkhouse	2017–2020	17	3	8 June 2017 vs. (Estonia)	8 September 2020 vs. (Denmark)
14	Carl Johnston	2021–2024	17	0	2 June 2021 vs. (Scotland)	15 October 2024 vs. (Luxembourg)
14	Makenzie Kirk	2021–2026	17	2	6 September 2024 vs. (England)	6 October 2026 vs. (Greece)
20	Jake Dunwoody	2017–2020	16	1	8 June 2017 vs. (Estonia)	13 October 2020 vs. (Ukraine)
20	Patrick Kelly	2023–2025	16	1	7 September 2023 vs. (Luxembourg)	14 October 2025 vs. (Germany)
20	Tommy Fogarty	2023–2025	16	0	12 September 2023 vs. (Ukraine)	18 November 2025 vs. (Greece)
23	Richard Graham	1998–2001	15	0	9 October 1998 vs. (Finland)	5 June 2001 vs. (Czech Republic)
23	Aaron Callaghan	2006–2008	15	0	6 February 2006 vs. (Israel)	26 March 2008 vs. (Romania)
23	David Buchanan	2006–2008	15	2	16 May 2006 vs. (Scotland)	26 March 2008 vs. (Romania)
23	Trevor Carson	2006–2009	15	0	14 November 2006 vs. (Germany)	17 November 2009 vs. (Czech Republic)
23	Craig Cathcart	2006–2009	15	0	14 November 2006 vs. (Germany)	17 November 2009 vs. (Czech Republic)
23	Dale Gorman	2015–2018	15	1	5 September 2015 vs. (Scotland)	16 October 2018 vs. (Slovakia)
23	Dale Taylor	2021–2024	15	3	2 June 2021 vs. (Scotland)	15 October 2024 vs. (Luxembourg)

Players with an equal number of caps are ranked in chronological order of reaching the milestone.

=== Top goalscorers ===
Last updated after the match against Greece on 6 October 2026.

Rank	Player	Year(s)	U-21 Goals	U-21 Caps	Goals per game	First Goal	Last Goal
1	Liam Donnelly	2012–2018	5	24	0.21	8 June 2017 vs. (Estonia)	11 September 2018 vs. (Spain)
1	Shayne Lavery	2016–2020	5	14	0.36	10 November 2017 vs. (Albania)	25 March 2019 vs. (Mexico)
3	Adrian Coote	1998–1999	4	12	0.33	21 April 1998 vs. (Switzerland)	17 August 1999 vs. (France)
3	David Healy	1998–1999	4	8	0.5	17 November 1998 vs. (Moldova)	17 August 1999 vs. (France)
3	Sam Morrow	2005–2006	4	4	1	8 February 2005 vs. (Scotland)	12 April 2006 vs. (Liechtenstein)
3	Thomas Stewart	2006–2008	4	19	0.21	16 May 2006 vs. (Scotland)	26 March 2008 vs. (Romania)
3	Josh Magennis	2009–2012	4	17	0.24	8 September 2009 vs. (Iceland)	7 September 2012 vs. (North Macedonia)
3	Oliver Norwood	2009–2012	4	11	0.36	13 November 2009 vs. (Germany)	2 March 2010 vs. (San Marino)
3	Paul O'Neill	2019–2021	4	10	0.4	9 October 2020 vs. (Finland)	12 November 2021 vs. (Lithuania)
10	Gary Hamilton	2000–2001	3	12	0.25	2 June 2000 vs. (Wales)	10 October 2000 vs. (Iceland)
10	Mo Harkin	2000–2001	3	9	0.33	28 March 2000 vs. (Malta)	10 October 2000 vs. (Iceland)
10	Grant McCann	2000–2001	3	11	0.27	10 October 2000 vs. (Iceland)	5 October 2001 vs. (Malta)
10	Lee McEvilly	2002–2003	3	9	0.33	6 September 2002 vs. (Scotland)	1 April 2003 vs. (Greece)
10	Chris Turner	2006–2008	3	12	0.25	1 June 2007 vs. (Moldova)	16 November 2007 vs. (Luxembourg)
10	Andrew Little	2008–2010	3	6	0.5	18 November 2008 vs. (Scotland)	3 September 2010 vs. (San Marino)
10	Billy Kee	2009–2011	3	10	0.3	10 August 2011 vs. (Faroe Islands)	10 August 2011 vs. (Faroe Islands)
10	David Parkhouse	2017–2020	3	17	0.18	8 June 2017 vs. (Estonia)	4 September 2020 vs. (Malta)
10	Alfie McCalmont	2019–2022	3	18	0.17	14 November 2019 vs. (Hungary)	12 November 2021 vs. (Lithuania)
10	Dale Taylor	2021–2024	3	15	0.2	2 June 2021 vs. (Scotland)	25 September 2022 vs. (Scotland)
10	Charlie Allen	2021–2024	3	14	0.21	26 March 2024 vs. (Serbia)	12 October 2024 vs. (Azerbaijan)

Players with an equal number of goals are ranked in chronological order of reaching the milestone.

=== Hat-tricks ===
The result is presented with Northern Ireland's score first.

Player	Goals	Date	Opponent	Venue	Result	Type of Game	Ref
Billy Kee	3	10 August 2011	Faroe Islands	The Oval, Belfast, Northern Ireland	4–0	2013 UEFA U-21 Group 4 Qualifier	

More than a hat-trick scored *

=== Red cards ===
The result is presented with Northern Ireland's score first.

Player	Date	Opponent	Venue	Result	Type of Game	Ref
Dave Waterman	21 April 1998	Switzerland	Mourneview Park, Lurgan, Northern Ireland	2–1	International Friendly	
Damien Johnson	2 June 1999	Republic of Ireland	Caledonian Stadium, Inverness, Scotland	0–1	(Scotland) 1999 Presidents Cup	
Paul McAreavey	6 October 2000	Denmark	The Oval, Belfast, Northern Ireland	0–3	(Switzerland) 2002 UEFA U-21 Group 3 Qualifier	
Wayne Carlisle	10 October 2000	Iceland	Kaplakriki, Hafnarfjörður, Iceland	2–5	(Switzerland) 2002 UEFA U-21 Group 3 Qualifier	
Hugh Dickson	5 October 2001	Malta	National Stadium, Ta' Qali, Malta	2–2	(Switzerland) 2002 UEFA U-21 Group 3 Qualifier	
Paddy McCourt	1 April 2003	Greece	The Oval, Belfast, Northern Ireland	2–6	(Germany) 2004 UEFA U-21 Group 6 Qualifier	
Kieran McKenna	14 November 2006	Germany	Hafenstadion, Torgau, Germany	1–2	International Friendly	
Johnny Flynn	11 August 2009	Portugal	Estádio Municipal da Guarda, Guarda, Portugal	1–2	International Friendly	
James Knowles	10 August 2011	Faroe Islands	The Oval, Belfast, Northern Ireland	4–0	(Israel) 2013 UEFA U-21 Group 4 Qualifier	
Conor McLaughlin	2 September 2011	Serbia	Stadion Karađorđe, Novi Sad, Serbia	0–1	(Israel) 2013 UEFA U-21 Group 4 Qualifier	
Shane Ferguson	10 May 2012	Macedonia	Milano Arena, Kumanovo, Macedonia	0–1	(Israel) 2013 UEFA U-21 Group 4 Qualifier	
Conor McLaughlin	7 September 2012	Macedonia	The Oval, Belfast, Northern Ireland	1–3	(Israel) 2013 UEFA U-21 Group 4 Qualifier	
Liam Donnelly	9 September 2013	Belgium	Den Dreef, Leuven, Belgium	0–1	(Czech Republic) 2015 UEFA U-21 Group 9 Qualifier	
Dale Gorman	5 September 2015	Scotland	Mourneview Park, Lurgan, Northern Ireland	1–2	(Poland) 2017 UEFA U-21 Group 3 Qualifier	
Conor Hazard	14 October 2019	Romania	Stadionul Anghel Iordănescu, Voluntari, Romania	0–3	(Hungary) (Slovenia) 2021 UEFA U-21 Group 8 Qualifier	
Trai Hume	16 November 2021	Malta	Mourneview Park, Lurgan, Northern Ireland	0–2	(Georgia (country)) (Romania) 2023 UEFA U-21 Group C Qualifier	
Aaron Donnelly	10 October 2023	Azerbaijan	Dalga Arena, Baku, Azerbaijan	1–0	(Slovakia) 2025 UEFA U-21 Group F Qualifier	
Charlie Allen	15 October 2024	Luxembourg	Stade Émile Mayrisch, Esch-sur-Alzette, Luxembourg	0–0	(Slovakia) 2025 UEFA U-21 Group F Qualifier	
Darren Robinson	31 March 2026	Latvia	Daugava National Stadium, Riga, Latvia	3–1	(Albania) (Serbia) 2027 UEFA U-21 Group F Qualifier	

== Individual and Team records ==
=== Goal records ===
- First goal: Gary Blackledge – 8 March 1978 vs Republic of Ireland
- Most goals scored in one game by a player: 3 – Billy Kee, 10 August 2011 vs Faroe Islands

=== Firsts ===
- First under-21 international: 8 March 1978 vs Republic of Ireland
- First home under-21 international: 3 April 1990 vs Israel
- First win: 3 April 1990 vs Israel
- First overseas opponent: Israel, 3 April 1990
- First win over an overseas opponent: 3 April 1990 vs Israel

=== Streaks ===
- Most consecutive victories: 6
  - 6 February 2006 – 16 May 2016
  - 6 September 2018 – 25 March 2019
- Most consecutive matches without defeat: 11
  - 9 September 2003 – 16 May 2006
- Most consecutive draws: 3
  - 29 May 2000 – 1 September 2000
- Most consecutive matches without a draw: 25
  - 6 February 2006 – 18 November 2008
- Most consecutive matches without victory: 14
  - 2 September 2011 – 14 November 2013
- Most consecutive defeats: 14
  - 2 September 2011 – 14 November 2013
- Most consecutive matches scoring: 8
  - 8 February 2005 – 16 May 2006
- Most consecutive matches without scoring: 4
  - 2 September 2011 – 10 May 2012
- Most consecutive matches conceding a goal: 29
  - 2 June 1999 – 9 September 2003
- Most consecutive matches without conceding a goal: 3
  - 6 February 2006 – 28 February 2006
  - 11 October 2018 – 22 March 2019

=== Biggest wins ===
Best Results by Northern Ireland under-21's
	Date	Opponent	Round	Result	Difference
1	16 November 2007	Luxembourg	(Sweden) 2009 UEFA U-21 Group 9 Qualifier	5–0	+5
1	12 October 2024	Azerbaijan	(Slovakia) 2025 UEFA U-21 Group F Qualifier	5–0	+5
3	10 May 2006	Liechtenstein	(Netherlands) 2007 UEFA U-21 Qualification preliminary round	4–0	+4
3	3 September 2010	San Marino	(Denmark) 2011 UEFA U-21 Group 5 Qualifier	4–0	+4
3	10 August 2011	Faroe Islands	(Israel) 2013 UEFA U-21 Group 4 Qualifier	4–0	+4
3	12 November 2021	Lithuania	(Georgia (country)) (Romania) 2023 UEFA U-21 Group C Qualifier	4–0	+4
3	26 September 2026	Malta	(Albania) (Serbia) 2027 UEFA U-21 Group F Qualifier	4–0	+4
8	10 October 2000	Iceland	(Switzerland) 2002 UEFA U-21 Group 3 Qualifier	5–2	+3
8	12 April 2006	Liechtenstein	(Netherlands) 2007 UEFA U-21 Qualification preliminary round	4–1	+3
8	20 November 2007	Moldova	(Sweden) 2009 UEFA U-21 Group 9 Qualifier	3–0	+3
8	2 March 2010	San Marino	(Denmark) 2011 UEFA U-21 Group 5 Qualifier	3–0	+3

=== Heaviest defeats ===
Worst Results by Northern Ireland under-21's
	Date	Opponent	Round	Result	Difference
1	4 June 2022	Spain	(Georgia (country)) (Romania) 2023 UEFA U-21 Group C Qualifier	0–6	-6
2	28 March 2022	France	International Friendly	0–5	-5
3	1 April 2003	Greece	(Germany) 2004 UEFA U-21 Group 6 Qualifier	2–6	-4
3	8 September 2009	Iceland	(Denmark) 2011 UEFA U-21 Group 5 Qualifier	2–6	-4
3	5 June 2001	Czech Republic	(Switzerland) 2002 UEFA U-21 Group 3 Qualifier	0–4	-4
3	6 February 2007	Wales	International Friendly	0–4	-4
3	24 May 2007	Scotland	International Friendly	0–4	-4
3	18 November 2025	Greece	(Albania) (Serbia) 2027 UEFA U-21 Group F Qualifier	0–4	-4
3	3 June 2026	Portugal	International Friendly	0–4	-4
10	10 June 2003	Spain	(Germany) 2004 UEFA U-21 Group 6 Qualifier	1–4	-3
10	20 August 2008	Ukraine	(Ukraine) Valeriy Lobanovskyi Memorial Tournament	1–4	-3
10	14 August 2013	Denmark	International Friendly	1–4	-3
10	9 September 2014	Serbia	(Czech Republic) 2015 UEFA U-21 Group 9 Qualifier	1–4	-3
10	3 September 2021	Malta	(Georgia (country)) (Romania) 2023 UEFA U-21 Group C Qualifier	1–4	-3
10	6 October 2000	Denmark	(Switzerland) 2002 UEFA U-21 Group 3 Qualifier	0–3	-3
10	16 August 2006	Romania	(Netherlands) 2007 UEFA U-21 Group 10 Qualifier	0–3	-3
10	7 September 2007	Germany	(Sweden) 2009 UEFA U-21 Group 9 Qualifier	0–3	-3
10	5 September 2008	Germany	(Sweden) 2009 UEFA U-21 Group 9 Qualifier	0–3	-3
10	7 September 2010	Germany	(Denmark) 2011 UEFA U-21 Group 5 Qualifier	0–3	-3
10	6 September 2011	Denmark	(Israel) 2013 UEFA U-21 Group 4 Qualifier	0–3	-3
10	10 September 2012	Denmark	(Israel) 2013 UEFA U-21 Group 4 Qualifier	0–3	-3
10	31 May 2013	Cyprus	(Czech Republic) 2015 UEFA U-21 Group 9 Qualifier	0–3	-3
10	14 November 2013	Italy	(Czech Republic) 2015 UEFA U-21 Group 9 Qualifier	0–3	-3
10	11 October 2016	France	(Poland) 2017 UEFA U-21 Group 3 Qualifier	0–3	-3
10	14 October 2019	Romania	(Hungary) (Slovenia) 2021 UEFA U-21 Group 8 Qualifier	0–3	-3
10	17 November 2020	Ukraine	(Hungary) (Slovenia) 2021 UEFA U-21 Group 8 Qualifier	0–3	-3
10	12 October 2021	Spain	(Georgia (country)) (Romania) 2023 UEFA U-21 Group C Qualifier	0–3	-3
10	21 November 2023	England	(Slovakia) 2023 UEFA U-21 Group F Qualifier	0–3	-3

== Performance ==
=== Performance by competition ===
Last updated after the match against Greece on 6 October 2026.

Competition	Pld	W	D	L	GF	GA	GD	Win %	Draw %	Loss %
UEFA European Under-21 Championship	120	32	20	68	127	194	-67	26.67%	16.67%	56.67%
International Friendlies	44	17	9	18	48	69	-21	38.64%	20.45%	40.91%
Minor Tournaments	8	1	4	3	7	11	-4	12.50%	50.00%	37.50%
Total	172	50	33	89	182	274	-92	29.07%	19.19%	51.74%

=== Performance by manager ===
Current manager highlighted in green

Last updated after the match against Greece on 6 October 2026.

Manager	First Game	Last Game	Pld	W	D	L	GF	GA	GD	Win %	Draw %	Loss %
(Northern Ireland) Danny Blanchflower	8 March 1978 vs. (Republic of Ireland)	8 March 1978 vs. (Republic of Ireland)	1	0	1	0	1	1	0	0.00%	100.00%	0.00%
(Northern Ireland) Billy Bingham	3 April 1990 vs. (Israel)	3 April 1990 vs. (Israel)	1	1	0	0	2	1	+1	100.00%	0.00%	0.00%
(Northern Ireland) Bryan Hamilton	22 March 1994 vs. (Romania)	22 March 1994 vs. (Romania)	1	0	1	0	0	0	0	0.00%	100.00%	0.00%
(Northern Ireland) Roy Millar	21 April 1998 vs. (Switzerland)	21 April 1998 vs. (Switzerland)	1	1	0	0	2	1	+1	100.00%	0.00%	0.00%
(Northern Ireland) Chris Nicholl	20 May 1998 vs. (Scotland)	8 October 1999 vs. (Finland)	13	3	5	5	11	13	–2	23.08%	38.46%	38.46%
(Northern Ireland) Roy Millar	28 March 2000 vs. (Malta)	26 March 2008 vs. (Romania)	48	18	8	22	64	79	–15	37.50%	16.67%	45.83%
(England) Steve Beaglehole	19 August 2008 vs. (Poland)	15 November 2011 vs. (Serbia)	21	4	3	14	23	39	–16	19.05%	14.29%	66.67%
(Northern Ireland) Steve Robinson	10 May 2012 vs. (North Macedonia)	15 October 2013 vs. (Serbia)	10	0	0	10	5	24	–19	0.00%	0.00%	100.00%
(Northern Ireland) Jim Magilton	14 November 2013 vs. (Italy)	11 October 2016 vs. (France)	14	1	2	11	8	27	–19	7.14%	14.29%	78.57%
(England) Ian Baraclough	8 June 2017 vs. (Estonia)	19 November 2019 vs. (Romania)	19	9	6	4	22	19	+3	47.37%	31.58%	21.05%
(England) Andy Crosby**	4 September 2020 vs. (Malta)	5 June 2021 vs. (Scotland)	7	3	0	4	9	11	–2	42.86%	0.00%	57.14%
(England) John Schofield	3 September 2021 vs. (Malta)	25 September 2022 vs. (Scotland)	11	2	2	7	10	27	–17	18.18%	18.18%	63.64%
(Northern Ireland) Tommy Wright	7 September 2023 vs. (Luxembourg)		25	8	5	12	25	32	–7	32.00%	20.00%	48.00%
Total			172	50	33	89	182	274	-92	29.07%	19.19%	51.74%

- * first two games as caretaker manager
- ** all 7 games as caretaker manager

=== Performance by venue ===
Last updated after the match against Greece on 6 October 2026.

Venue	Played	Won	Drawn	Lost	GF	GA	GD	Win %	Draw %	Loss %
Home	78	25	16	37	103	124	-21	32.05%	20.51%	47.44%
Away	86	22	15	49	73	144	-71	25.58%	17.44%	56.98%
Neutral	8	3	2	3	6	6	0	37.50%	25.00%	37.50%
Total	172	50	33	89	182	274	-92	29.07%	19.19%	51.74%

=== Performance by decade ===
Still active decade highlighted in green

Last updated after the match against Greece on 6 October 2026.

Decade	Pld	W	D	L	GF	GA	GD	Win %	Draw %	Loss %
1970s	1	0	1	0	1	1	0	0.00%	100.00%	0.00%
1990s	16	5	6	5	15	15	0	31.25%	37.50%	31.25%
2000s	59	19	10	30	75	104	-29	32.20%	16.95%	50.85%
2010s	53	13	9	31	47	84	-37	24.53%	16.98%	58.49%
2020s	43	13	7	23	44	70	-26	30.23%	16.28%	53.49%
Total	172	50	33	89	182	274	-92	29.07%	19.19%	51.74%

== All-time records ==
=== Head to head records ===
Last updated after the match against Greece on 6 October 2026.

Positive Record Neutral Record Negative Record

Opponent	Confederation	Pld	W	D	L	GF	GA	GD	Win %	Draw %	Loss %
Albania	UEFA	2	1	1	0	2	1	+1	50.00%	50.00%	0.00%
Armenia	UEFA	2	1	0	1	3	3	0	50.00%	0.00%	50.00%
Azerbaijan	UEFA	2	2	0	0	6	0	+6	100.00%	0.00%	0.00%
Belgium	UEFA	2	0	0	2	0	2	-2	0.00%	0.00%	100.00%
Bulgaria	UEFA	3	1	1	1	2	3	-1	33.33%	33.33%	33.33%
Cyprus	UEFA	2	1	0	1	1	3	-2	50.00%	0.00%	50.00%
Czech Republic	UEFA	5	0	0	5	1	13	-12	0.00%	0.00%	100.00%
Denmark	UEFA	7	0	0	7	2	18	-16	0.00%	0.00%	100.00%
England	UEFA	3	0	1	2	0	5	-5	0.00%	33.33%	66.67%
Estonia	UEFA	2	2	0	0	6	3	+3	100.00%	0.00%	0.00%
Faroe Islands	UEFA	2	1	1	0	4	0	+4	50.00%	50.00%	0.00%
Finland	UEFA	6	2	2	2	10	9	+1	33.33%	33.33%	33.33%
France	UEFA	4	1	0	3	3	10	-7	25.00%	0.00%	75.00%
Georgia	UEFA	2	0	2	0	2	2	0	0.00%	100.00%	0.00%
Germany	UEFA	11	1	1	9	6	22	-16	9.09%	9.09%	81.82%
Greece	UEFA	4	1	0	3	3	11	-8	25.00%	0.00%	75.00%
Hungary	UEFA	2	0	1	1	3	4	-1	0.00%	50.00%	50.00%
Iceland	UEFA	8	2	2	4	11	15	-4	25.00%	25.00%	50.00%
Israel	UEFA	5	3	0	2	6	6	0	60.00%	0.00%	40.00%
Italy	UEFA	2	0	0	2	0	5	-5	0.00%	0.00%	100.00%
Latvia	UEFA	2	2	0	0	4	1	+3	100.00%	0.00%	0.00%
Liechtenstein	UEFA	2	2	0	0	8	1	+7	100.00%	0.00%	0.00%
Lithuania	UEFA	2	1	1	0	5	1	+4	50.00%	50.00%	0.00%
Luxembourg	UEFA	5	3	1	1	8	2	+6	60.00%	20.00%	20.00%
Malta	UEFA	9	5	2	2	16	9	+7	55.56%	22.22%	22.22%
Mexico	CONCACAF	1	1	0	0	2	1	+1	100.00%	0.00%	0.00%
Moldova	UEFA	5	2	3	0	6	2	+4	40.00%	60.00%	0.00%
North Macedonia	UEFA	4	0	0	4	2	8	-6	0.00%	0.00%	100.00%
Poland	UEFA	1	0	0	1	0	1	-1	0.00%	0.00%	100.00%
Portugal	UEFA	2	0	0	2	1	6	-5	0.00%	0.00%	100.00%
Republic of Ireland	UEFA	4	1	2	1	4	4	0	25.00%	50.00%	25.00%
Romania	UEFA	6	0	2	4	1	11	-10	0.00%	33.33%	66.67%
San Marino	UEFA	2	2	0	0	7	0	+7	100.00%	0.00%	0.00%
Scotland	UEFA	15	4	5	6	19	26	-7	26.67%	33.33%	40.00%
Serbia	UEFA	6	1	0	5	5	13	-8	16.67%	0.00%	83.33%
Slovakia	UEFA	4	2	0	2	3	3	0	50.00%	0.00%	50.00%
Spain	UEFA	6	1	0	5	6	20	-14	16.67%	0.00%	83.33%
Switzerland	UEFA	2	1	1	0	2	1	+1	50.00%	50.00%	0.00%
Turkey	UEFA	2	0	0	2	1	4	-3	0.00%	0.00%	100.00%
Ukraine	UEFA	11	1	3	7	7	17	-10	9.09%	27.27%	63.64%
Uzbekistan	AFC	1	1	0	0	1	0	+1	100.00%	0.00%	0.00%
Wales	UEFA	4	1	1	2	3	8	-5	25.00%	25.00%	50.00%
Total		172	50	33	89	182	274	-92	29.07%	19.19%	51.74%

=== UEFA under-21 teams yet to play against Northern Ireland ===
Last updated after the match against Greece on 6 October 2026.

UEFA Members
Andorra
Austria
Belarus
Bosnia and Herzegovina
Croatia
Gibraltar
Kazakhstan
Kosovo
Montenegro
Netherlands
Norway
Russia
Slovenia
Sweden

== Competitive record ==
Champions Runners-up Third Place Fourth Place

=== UEFA European Under-21 Championship Record ===
UEFA Under-21 Football Championship finals record										Qualification record						Manager(s)
Year	Round	Pos	Pld	W	D	L	GF	GA	Squad	Pld	W	D	L	GF	GA	Manager(s)
1978	Did not enter									Did not enter						None
1980	Did not enter									Did not enter						None
1982	Did not enter									Did not enter						None
1984	Did not enter									Did not enter						None
1986	Did not enter									Did not enter						None
1988	Did not enter									Did not enter						None
1990	Did not enter									Did not enter						None
1992	Did not enter									Did not enter						None
(France) 1994	Did not enter									Did not enter						None
(Spain) 1996	Did not enter									Did not enter						None
(Romania) 1998	Did not enter									Did not enter						None
(Slovakia) 2000	Did not qualify									8	1	3	4	5	9	Chris Nicholl
(Switzerland) 2002	Did not qualify									10	2	2	6	12	21	Roy Millar
(Germany) 2004	Did not qualify									8	2	1	5	8	16	Roy Millar
(Portugal) 2006	Did not enter									Did not enter						None
(Netherlands) 2007	Did not qualify									4	2	0	2	10	7	Roy Millar
(Sweden) 2009	Did not qualify									8	4	0	4	13	12	Roy Millar, Steve Beaglehole (Note: Roy Millar managed for the first seven qualifying matches. Steve Beaglehole managed the last game of the qualification campaign.)
(Denmark) 2011	Did not qualify									8	2	1	5	12	16	Steve Beaglehole
(Israel) 2013	Did not qualify									8	1	1	6	5	13	Steve Beaglehole, Stephen Robinson (Note: Steve Beaglehole managed for the first five qualifying matches. Stephen Robinson managed the remainder of the qualification campaign.)
(Czech Republic) 2015	Did not qualify									8	1	0	7	3	17	Stephen Robinson, Jim Magilton (Note: Stephen Robinson managed for the first four qualifying matches. Jim Magilton managed the remainder of the qualification campaign.)
(Poland) 2017	Did not qualify									10	0	2	8	6	18	Jim Magilton
(Italy) (San Marino) 2019	Did not qualify									10	6	2	2	15	11	Ian Baraclough
(Hungary) (Slovenia) 2021	Did not qualify									10	2	3	5	7	13	Ian Baraclough, Andy Crosby (Note: Ian Baraclough managed for the first five qualifying matches. Andy Crosby was appointed caretaker manager for the remainder of the qualification campaign.)
(Georgia (country)) (Romania) 2023	Did not qualify									8	2	1	5	8	18	John Schofield
(Slovakia) 2025	Did not qualify									10	3	2	5	10	10	Tommy Wright
(Albania) (Serbia) 2027	Did not qualify									10	4	2	4	13	13	Tommy Wright
Total	-	0/25	0	0	0	0	0	0	-	120	32	20	68	127	194	-

=== Minor tournaments ===
Year	Round	Pos	Pld	W	D	L	GF	GA	GD
(Republic of Ireland) 1998 Presidents Cup	Winners, group stage	1st	2	1	1	0	2	1	+1
(Scotland) 1999 Presidents Cup	Group stage	3rd	2	0	1	1	1	2	-1
(Northern Ireland) 2000 International Challenge Tournament	Group stage	2nd	2	0	2	0	3	3	0
(Ukraine) 2008 Valeriy Lobanovskyi Memorial Tournament	Group stage	4th	2	0	0	2	1	5	-4
Total			8	1	4	3	7	11	-4

== Honours ==
=== Titles ===
- Presidents Cup
  - Winners (1): 1998
