= 2007 UEFA European Under-21 Championship qualification preliminary round =

The qualification preliminary round matches were played from 12 April to 29 June 2006. Winners of the preliminary round were advanced to the group stage.

== Matches ==
| Team 1 | Agg. | Team 2 | 1st leg | 2nd leg |
|---|---|---|---|---|
| Estonia | 1–7 | Wales | 0–2 | 1–5 |
| Malta | 2–4 | Georgia | 1–2 | 1–2 |
| San Marino | 3–4 | Armenia | 3–0 | 0–4 |
| Liechtenstein | 1–8 | Northern Ireland | 1–4 | 0–4 |
| Kazakhstan | 0–1 | Moldova | 0–0 | 0–1 |
| Luxembourg | 0–5 | Macedonia | 0–3 | 0–2 |
| Andorra | 0–2 | Iceland | 0–0 | 0–2 |
| Azerbaijan | 0-6 | Republic of Ireland | 0-3* | 0–3 |

== First leg ==
12 April 2006
18:00

| Malta | 1 – 2 | Georgia |
|---|---|---|
| Falzon 83' | Report | Martsvaladze 15'; Pipia 41' |

Ta' Qali National Stadium, Ta' Qali
Attendance: 530
Referee: Adrian Mccourt (Northern Ireland)

12 April 2006
19:00

| Liechtenstein | 1 – 4 | Northern Ireland |
|---|---|---|
| Scullion 9' (o.g.) | Report | Morrow 33', 61'; Gilfilan 58'; Scullion 84' |

Rheinpark Stadion, Vaduz
Attendance: 550
Referee: Robert Kranjc (Slovenia)

12 April 2006
19:30

| Luxembourg | 0 – 3 | Macedonia |
|---|---|---|
| | Report | Bajrami 20'; Šikov 49'; Nedžipi 70' |

Stade de la Frontière, Esch-sur-Alzette
Attendance: 700
Referee: Aleksei Kulbakov (Belarus)

3 May 2006
18:00

| Andorra | 0 – 0 | Iceland |
|---|---|---|
| | Report |

Estadi Comunal, Andorra la Vella
Attendance: 230
Referee: Albano Janku (Albania)

10 May 2006
17:45

| Estonia | 0 – 2 | Wales |
|---|---|---|
| | Report | Cotterill 28' (pen.); A. Davies 76' |

A. Le Coq Arena, Tallinn
Attendance: 1,500
Referee: Markus Strömbergsson (Sweden)

11 May 2006
15:00

| Azerbaijan | 0 – 3 (awarded) | Republic of Ireland |
|---|---|---|
| Aghakishiyev 21' | Report | A. Keogh 59', 90' |

Shafa Stadium, Baku
Attendance: 500
Referee: Goran Spirkoski (Macedonia)

Match originally ended as a 2–1 victory for Republic of Ireland, but UEFA later awarded the match as a 3–0 forfeit win to the same team due to Azerbaijan including ineligible players in their squad.

17 May 2006
17:30

| San Marino | 3 – 0 (awarded) | Armenia |
|---|---|---|
| Valli 69' | Report | Petrosyan 11'; Arzumanyan 31' |

San Marino Stadium, Serravalle
Attendance: 200
Referee: Heraklis Tsikinis (Greece)

Match originally ended as a 2–1 victory for Armenia, but UEFA later awarded the match as a 3–0 forfeit win to San Marino due to Armenia including ineligible players in their squad.

9 June 2006
14:00

| Kazakhstan | 0 – 0 | Moldova |
|---|---|---|
| | Report |

Central Stadium, Almaty
Attendance: 4,500
Referee: Cem Papila (Turkey)

== Second leg ==
26 April 2006
10:00

| Georgia | 2 – 1 | Malta |
|---|---|---|
| Khubutia 41'; Chelidze 63' (pen.) | Report | Falzon 82' |

Central Stadium, Zestaponi
Attendance: 5,000
Referee: Veaceslav Banari (Moldova)

Georgia won 4–2 on aggregate

26 April 2006
16:00

| Macedonia | 2 – 0 | Luxembourg |
|---|---|---|
| Tasevski 3' (pen.); Nedžipi 39' | Report |

Stadion Goce Delčev, Prilep
Attendance: 300
Referee: Claudio Circhetta (Switzerland)

Macedonia won 5–0 on aggregate

10 May 2006
20:30

| Northern Ireland | 4 – 0 | Liechtenstein |
|---|---|---|
| Thompson 9'; Clarke 41'; Shiels 42'; McArdle 77' | Report |

Windsor Park, Belfast
Attendance: 497
Referee: Sten Kaldma (Estonia)

Northern Ireland won 8–1 on aggregate

18 May 2006
20:30

| Republic of Ireland | 3 – 0 | Azerbaijan |
|---|---|---|
| O'Donovan 37'; Foley 69'; A. Keogh 75' | Report |

Buckley Park, Kilkenny
Attendance: 1,600
Referee: Adrian D. Casha (Malta)

Republic of Ireland won 6–0 on aggregate

24 May 2006
18:30

| Wales | 5 – 1 | Estonia |
|---|---|---|
| C. Davies 3', 27', 45'; A. Davies 43', 73' | Report | Gussev 60' |

The Racecourse Ground, Wrexham
Attendance: 1,575
Referee: Garðar Örn Hinriksson (Iceland)

Wales won 7–1 on aggregate

1 June 2006
20:15

| Iceland | 2 – 0 | Andorra |
|---|---|---|
| Hallfreðsson 79' (pen.); Gíslason 90+2' | Report |

Akranesvöllur, Akranes
Attendance: 200
Referee: Luc Wilmes (Luxembourg)

Iceland won 2–0 on aggregate

9 June 2006
14:00

| Armenia | 4 – 0 | San Marino |
|---|---|---|
| Palazzi 52' (o.g.); Ghazaryan 67'; Sargsyan 72'; Arzumanyan 85' | Report |

Republican Stadium, Yerevan
Attendance: 3,900
Referee: William Collum (Scotland)

Armenia won 4–3 on aggregate

29 June 2006
19:00

| Moldova | 1 – 0 | Kazakhstan |
|---|---|---|
| Namasco 90+1' (pen.) | Report |

Zimbru Stadium, Chișinău
Attendance: 2,800
Referee: Marek Mikołajewski (Poland)

Moldova won 1–0 on aggregate
