= 1996 UEFA European Under-21 Championship qualification =

Football tournament qualification stage

The 1996 UEFA European Under-21 Championship qualification began in 1994 and finished in early 1996. The final tournament was held in 1996 in Spain.

The 44 national teams were divided into 8 groups (four groups of 5 + four groups of 6). The group winners qualify to the quarterfinals.

== Qualifying ==
=== Draw ===
The allocation of teams into qualifying groups was based on that of UEFA Euro 1996 qualifying tournament with several changes, reflecting the absence of some nations:

- Groups 1, 2, 3, 4 and 5 featured the same nations
- Group 6 did not include Northern Ireland, and Liechtenstein, but included England (who did not participate in senior Euro qualification)
- Group 7 did not include Albania
- Group 8 did not include Faroe Islands

=== Group 1 ===
Qualifying Group 1		P	W	D	L	F	A	Pts
1	France	10	6	3	1	25	3	21
2	Poland	10	5	2	3	18	18	17
3	Romania	10	4	4	2	17	10	16
4	Slovakia	10	4	2	4	11	10	14
5	Israel	10	3	3	4	12	11	12
6	Azerbaijan	10	1	0	9	5	36	3

- Israel 2–2 Poland
- Romania 5–2 Azerbaijan
- Slovakia 0–3 France
- France 0–0 Romania
- Israel 2–0 Slovakia
- Poland 5–0 Azerbaijan
- Romania 0–0 Slovakia
- Poland 0–4 France
- Azerbaijan 1–2 Israel
- Israel 0–1 Romania
- Azerbaijan 0–5 France
- Israel 1–1 France
- Romania 1–2 Poland
- Slovakia 3–0 Azerbaijan
- Poland 1–0 Israel
- Azerbaijan 0–5 Romania
- France 0–1 Slovakia
- Poland 1–0 Slovakia
- Romania 1–0 Israel
- Azerbaijan 1–0 Slovakia
- France 4–1 Poland
- Poland 3–3 Romania
- Slovakia 1–1 Israel
- France 5–0 Azerbaijan
- Israel 4–0 Azerbaijan
- Slovakia 3–1 Poland
- Romania 0–0 France
- Azerbaijan 1–2 Poland
- Slovakia 3–1 Romania
- France 3–0 Israel

France qualify as group winners

=== Group 2 ===
Qualifying Group 2		P	W	D	L	F	A	Pts
1	Spain	10	7	2	1	27	10	23
2	Belgium	10	5	4	1	26	10	19
3	Denmark	10	6	1	3	31	15	19
4	Macedonia	10	4	0	6	16	27	12
5	Cyprus	10	3	1	6	10	25	10
6	Armenia	10	1	0	9	8	31	3

- Belgium 7–0 Armenia
- Cyprus 0–6 Spain
- R.Macedonia 5–3 Denmark
- Armenia 1–2 Cyprus
- Denmark 0–1 Belgium
- R.Macedonia 0–1 Spain
- Belgium 7–0 R.Macedonia
- Spain 1–0 Denmark
- Cyprus 2–1 Armenia
- Belgium 3–3 Spain
- R.Macedonia 1–0 Cyprus
- Spain 1–1 Belgium
- Cyprus 1–5 Denmark
- Belgium 1–0 Cyprus
- Denmark 5–2 R.Macedonia
- Armenia 0–3 Spain
- Armenia 2–0 R.Macedonia
- Spain 4–0 Armenia
- Denmark 4–0 Cyprus
- R.Macedonia 3–0 Belgium
- Armenia 2–3 Denmark
- Belgium 2–2 Denmark
- R.Macedonia 3–2 Armenia
- Spain 3–1 Cyprus
- Armenia 0–3 Belgium
- Denmark 5–1 Spain
- Cyprus 3–2 R.Macedonia
- Denmark 4–0 Armenia
- Spain 4–0 R.Macedonia
- Cyprus 1–1 Belgium

Spain qualify as group winners

=== Group 3 ===
Qualifying Group 3		P	W	D	L	F	A	Pts
1	Hungary	8	6	1	1	14	8	19
2	Sweden	8	5	1	2	15	4	16
3	Turkey	8	4	2	2	13	12	14
4	Switzerland	8	2	1	5	9	16	7
5	Iceland	8	0	1	7	7	18	1

- Hungary 2–1 Turkey
- Iceland 0–1 Sweden
- Switzerland 0–5 Sweden
- Turkey 3–0 Iceland
- Sweden 0–1 Hungary
- Switzerland 2–1 Iceland
- Turkey 1–1 Switzerland
- Hungary 1–0 Switzerland
- Turkey 0–0 Sweden
- Hungary 2–1 Sweden
- Switzerland 0–2 Turkey
- Sweden 1–0 Iceland
- Iceland 1–1 Hungary
- Iceland 2–4 Switzerland
- Sweden 1–0 Switzerland
- Turkey 2–1 Hungary
- Iceland 2–3 Turkey
- Switzerland 2–3 Hungary
- Hungary 3–1 Iceland
- Sweden 6–1 Turkey

Hungary qualify as group winners

=== Group 4 ===
Qualifying Group 4		P	W	D	L	F	A	Pts
1	Italy	10	6	3	1	22	8	21
2	Ukraine	10	6	2	2	24	12	20
3	Slovenia	10	6	1	3	19	12	19
4	Croatia	10	5	2	3	13	12	17
5	Lithuania	10	2	2	6	14	16	8
6	Estonia	10	0	0	10	5	37	0

- Estonia 1–2 Croatia
- Ukraine 3–2 Lithuania
- Slovenia 1–1 Italy
- Estonia 1–4 Italy
- Croatia 2–0 Lithuania
- Ukraine 1–0 Slovenia
- Ukraine 3–0 Estonia
- Slovenia 3–0 Lithuania
- Italy 2–1 Croatia
- Italy 7–0 Estonia
- Croatia 1–0 Ukraine
- Lithuania 0–1 Croatia
- Slovenia 5–0 Estonia
- Ukraine 2–1 Italy
- Croatia 0–2 Slovenia
- Estonia 2–5 Ukraine
- Lithuania 0–2 Italy
- Lithuania 1–2 Slovenia
- Estonia 1–2 Slovenia
- Ukraine 1–1 Croatia
- Estonia 0–5 Lithuania
- Croatia 1–0 Estonia
- Lithuania 3–3 Ukraine
- Italy 1–0 Slovenia
- Croatia 2–2 Italy
- Lithuania 3–0 Estonia
- Slovenia 0–5 Ukraine
- Italy 2–1 Ukraine
- Slovenia 4–2 Croatia
- Italy 0–0 Lithuania

Italy qualify as group winners

=== Group 5 ===
Qualifying Group 5		P	W	D	L	F	A	Pts
1	Czech Republic	10	7	2	1	33	9	23
2	Norway	10	7	0	3	32	13	21
3	Netherlands	10	6	2	2	23	9	20
4	Belarus	10	5	1	4	20	16	16
5	Malta	10	1	2	7	4	25	5
6	Luxembourg	10	0	1	9	0	40	1

- Czech Rep. 1–0 Malta
- Luxembourg 0–4 Netherlands
- Norway 4–0 Belarus
- Malta 0–7 Czech Republic
- Norway 1–0 Netherlands
- Belarus 3–0 Luxembourg
- Netherlands 2–2 Czech Rep.
- Malta 2–3 Norway
- Netherlands 3–0 Luxembourg
- Malta 1–0 Luxembourg
- Luxembourg 0–8 Norway
- Netherlands 4–0 Malta
- Czech Rep. 2–0 Belarus
- Norway 5–0 Luxembourg
- Belarus 4–0 Malta
- Czech Rep. 2–2 Netherlands
- Belarus 4–2 Norway
- Luxembourg 0–7 Czech Rep.
- Norway 3–0 Malta
- Belarus 3–1 Netherlands
- Norway 3–4 Czech Rep.
- Luxembourg 0–0 Malta
- Netherlands 3–0 Belarus
- Czech Rep. 1–2 Norway
- Belarus 0–3 Czech Rep.
- Luxembourg 0–5 Belarus
- Malta 0–2 Netherlands
- Malta 1–1 Belarus
- Netherlands 2–1 Norway
- Czech Rep. 4–0 Luxembourg

Czech Republic qualify as group winners

=== Group 6 ===
Qualifying Group 6		P	W	D	L	F	A	Pts
1	Portugal	8	6	2	0	14	2	20
2	England	8	6	1	1	13	4	19
3	Republic of Ireland	8	2	2	4	7	9	8
4	Austria	8	2	1	5	5	11	7
5	Latvia	8	0	2	6	1	14	2

- England 0–0 Portugal
- Latvia 1–1 Ireland
- Latvia 0–1 Portugal
- Austria 1–3 England
- Portugal 2–0 Austria
- England 1–0 Ireland
- Ireland 0–2 England
- Austria 0–0 Latvia
- Ireland 1–1 Portugal
- Latvia 0–1 England
- Portugal 4–0 Latvia
- England 4–0 Latvia
- Ireland 3–0 Austria
- Latvia 0–2 Austria
- Portugal 2–0 England
- Austria 1–0 Ireland
- Austria 0–1 Portugal
- Ireland 1–0 Latvia
- England 2–1 Austria
- Portugal 3–1 Ireland

Portugal qualify as group winners

=== Group 7 ===
Qualifying Group 7		P	W	D	L	F	A	Pts
1	Germany	8	6	1	1	22	5	19
2	Bulgaria	8	5	2	1	11	10	17
3	Wales	8	3	1	4	11	13	10
4	Moldova	8	2	2	4	5	11	8
5	Georgia	8	1	0	7	7	17	3

- Georgia 3–0 Moldova
- Bulgaria 1–0 Georgia
- Moldova 1–0 Wales
- Bulgaria 2–0 Moldova
- Georgia 1–2 Wales
- Wales 1–1 Bulgaria
- Moldova 1–1 Germany
- Bulgaria 3–1 Wales
- Georgia 0–2 Germany
- Germany 1–0 Wales
- Moldova 0–0 Bulgaria
- Bulgaria 2–0 Germany
- Wales 5–1 Georgia
- Germany 3–0 Georgia
- Wales 1–0 Moldova
- Germany 3–1 Moldova
- Wales 1–5 Germany
- Georgia 1–2 Bulgaria
- Germany 7–0 Bulgaria
- Moldova 2–1 Georgia

Germany qualify as group winners

=== Group 8 ===
Qualifying Group 8		P	W	D	L	F	A	Pts
1	Scotland	8	7	0	1	16	4	21
2	Finland	8	5	1	2	17	12	16
3	Russia	8	4	1	3	17	6	13
4	Greece	8	3	0	5	12	12	9
5	San Marino	8	0	0	8	1	29	0

- Finland 1–0 Scotland
- Greece 3–4 Finland
- Russia 3–0 San Marino
- Greece 4–0 San Marino
- Scotland 2–1 Russia
- Finland 4–0 San Marino
- Greece 1–2 Scotland
- San Marino 0–6 Finland
- Russia 1–2 Scotland
- Greece 0–1 Russia
- San Marino 0–1 Scotland
- San Marino 0–7 Russia
- Finland 1–0 Greece
- Finland 1–1 Russia
- Scotland 3–0 Greece
- San Marino 1–3 Greece
- Scotland 5–0 Finland
- Russia 0–1 Greece
- Scotland 1–0 San Marino
- Russia 3–0 Finland

Scotland qualify as group winners

== See also ==
- 1996 UEFA European Under-21 Championship
