= 2009 UEFA European Under-21 Championship qualification Group 9 =

Football tournament qualification stage

The teams competing in group 9 of the 2009 UEFA European Under-21 Championship qualifying competition are Germany, Israel, Luxembourg, Moldova and Northern Ireland.

== Standings ==
Team	Pld	W	D	L	GF	GA	GD	Pts
Germany	8	5	2	1	24	3	+21	17
Israel	8	5	2	1	16	5	+11	17
Northern Ireland	8	4	0	4	13	12	+1	12
Moldova	8	4	0	4	6	8	−2	12
Luxembourg	8	0	0	8	1	32	−31	0

Key: Pts Points, Pld Matches played, W Won, D Drawn, L Lost, GF Goals for, GA Goals against, GD Goal Difference

== Matches ==
1 June 2007
19:00 CEST

Moldova	0 – 1	Northern Ireland
	Report	Turner 2'

Sheriff Stadium, Tiraspol
Referee: Aleksandr Gvardis (Russia)

7 September 2007
16:00 CEST

Israel	3 – 0	Luxembourg
Buzaglo 19'; Shechter 25' (pen.); Gabay 80'	Report

Ramat Gan Stadium, Ramat Gan
Referee: Stefano Podeschi (San Marino)
7 September 2007
20:30 CEST

Northern Ireland	0 – 3	Germany
	Report	Ebert 78'; Özil 90'; Hennings 90+2'

Mourneview Park, Lurgan
Referee: Paolo Tagliavento (Italy)

11 September 2007
18:00 EEST

Moldova	1 – 0	Israel
Stinga 89'	Report

Sheriff Stadium, Tiraspol
Referee: Draženko Kovačić (Croatia)
12 September 2007
17:00 EEST

Luxembourg	1 – 2	Northern Ireland
Sagramola 9'	Report	Fordyce 53'; Waterworth 74'

Stade rue Henri Dunant, Beggen
Referee: Ninoslav Spasić (Serbia)

12 October 2007
14:00 CET

Israel	2 – 2	Germany
Buzaglo 43'; Azriel 70'	Report	Hennings 18', 78'

Ramat Gan Stadium, Ramat Gan
Referee: Alfonso Perez Burrull (Spain)
13 October 2007
15:30 CET

Luxembourg	0 – 2	Moldova
	Report	Frantuz 76' (pen.); Stinga 83'

Op Flohr Stadion, Grevenmacher
Referee: Ararat Tchagharyan (Armenia)

16 October 2007
20:15 CET

Germany	3 – 0	Moldova
Özil 36', 69'; Hennings 90+3'	Report

Sportpark Husterhöhe, Pirmasens
Referee: Mark Whitby (Wales)
17 October 2007
18:00 CET

Northern Ireland	1 – 3	Israel
Turner 5'	Report	Buzaglo 1'; Shechter 51'; Azriel 81'

Mourneview Park, Lurgan
Referee: Daniel Stalhammar (Sweden)

16 November 2007
20:30 CET

Northern Ireland	5 – 0	Luxembourg
Buchanan 2'; Waterworth 5'; O'Connor 8'; Turner 56'; Ward 27'	Report

Mourneview Park, Lurgan
Referee: Johannes Valgeirsson (Iceland)

20 November 2007
19:45 CET

Luxembourg	0 – 7	Germany
	Report	Hennings 8', 44'; Kruska 12' (pen.); Rosenthal 19', 23'; Özbek 30'; Dejagah 90'

Stade Josy Barthel, Luxembourg City
Referee: Jan Jilej (Czech Republic)
20 November 2007
14:30 CET

Northern Ireland	3 – 0	Moldova
O'Connor 4'; Ward 10'; Buchanan 11'	Report

Mourneview Park, Lurgan
Referee: Fırat Aydınus (Turkey)

6 February 2008
17:00 CET

Israel	2 – 1	Northern Ireland
Sahar 66'; Srur 86'	Report	Stewart 81'

Ramat Gan Stadium, Ramat Gan
Referee: Mechalis Germanakos (Greece)

25 March 2008
20:15 CEST

Germany	6 – 0	Luxembourg
Khedira 28', 47', 58'; Özil 50'; Hennings 54'; Özbek 85'	Report

BRITA-Arena, Wiesbaden
Referee: Svein-Erik Edvartsen (Norway)
26 March 2008
16:00 CEST

Israel	1 – 0	Moldova
Sahar 7'	Report

Ramat Gan Stadium, Ramat Gan
Referee: Angel Angelov (Bulgaria)

19 August 2008
18:00 CEST

Moldova	1 – 0	Germany
Aogo 15'(o.g.)	Report

Sheriff Stadium, Tiraspol
Referee: Marijo Strahonja (Croatia)

5 September 2008
20:15 CEST

Luxembourg	0 – 5	Israel
	Report	Rafaelov 14', 42'; Avidor 31'; Jan 70'; Kahlon 88'

Stade de la Frontière, Esch-sur-Alzette
Referee: Simon Lee Evans (Wales)
5 September 2008
20:15 CEST

Germany	3 – 0	Northern Ireland
Kroos 11'; Halfar 38'; Aogo 61'	Report

Stadion am Zoo, Wuppertal
Referee: Michail Koukoulakis (Greece)

9 September 2008
19:00 CEST

Germany	0 – 0	Israel
	Report

MSV Arena, Duisburg
Attendance: 3,885
Referee: Steve Tanner (England)
9 September 2008
18:00 CEST

Moldova	2 – 0	Luxembourg
Livandovschi 53'; Patras 72'	Report

Sheriff Stadium, Tiraspol
Referee: Dimitar Meckarovski (Macedonia)

== Goalscorers ==
Pos	Player	Country	Goals
1	Rouwen Hennings	Germany	7
2	Mesut Özil	Germany	4
3	Maor Buzaglo	Israel	3
3	Sami Khedira	Germany	3
3	Chris Turner	Northern Ireland	3
6	Hen Azriel	Israel	2
6	David Buchanan	Northern Ireland	2
6	Michael O'Connor	Northern Ireland	2
6	Barış Özbek	Germany	2
6	Lior Rafaelov	Israel	2
6	Jan Rosenthal	Germany	2
6	Ben Sahar	Israel	2
6	Itay Shechter	Israel	2
6	Petru Stinga	Moldova	2
6	Jamie Ward	Northern Ireland	2
6	Andrew Waterworth	Northern Ireland	2

1 goal

- Germany: Dennis Aogo, Ashkan Dejagah, Patrick Ebert, Daniel Halfar, Toni Kroos, Marc-André Kruska
- Israel: Yuval Avidor, Dovev Gabay, Tamir Kahlon, Idan Srur, Lior Jan
- Luxembourg: Chris Sagramola
- Moldova: Maxim Frantuz, Iurie Livandovschi, Artur Pătraş
- Northern Ireland: Daryl Fordyce, Thomas Stewart

Own goals

- Germany: Dennis Aogo
