= David Scullion =

Northern Irish footballer

Personal information
- Full name: David Scullion
- Date of birth: 27 April 1984 (age 42)
- Place of birth: Lurgan, Northern Ireland
- Height: 1.70 m (5 ft 7 in)
- Position: Winger

Youth career
- 2000: Portadown
- 2000–2002: Aston Villa

Senior career*
Years	Team	Apps	(Gls)
2000	Portadown	10	(0)
2001–2002	Aston Villa	0	(0)
2002–2003	Glenavon	27	(1)
2003–2007	Dungannon Swifts	?	(?)
2007–2009	Glentoran	?	(11)
2009–2010	Derry City	21	(3)
2010	Richmond	12	(1)
2010–2013	Coleraine	56	(9)
2013–2017	Glentoran	174	(34)
2017–2019	Larne		

International career
2005–2006	Northern Ireland U21		
- * Club domestic league appearances and goals

David Scullion (born 27 April 1984 in Lurgan) is a Northern Irish former footballer.

== Career ==
A midfielder who began his career at Portadown. Aged 16, and after only 10 league appearances at Shamrock Park he signed for Aston Villa. At Villa, he was part of the 2002 FA Youth Cup winning side, but was unable to break into the first team.

David returned home and joined home town club Glenavon, before moving to Dungannon Swifts in 2003.

Under Joe McAree, Scullion was a key member of the Dungannon Swifts team and played a huge role in guiding the club to a 4th-place finish in the Carling Premier league (Now the Danske Bank NIFL Premiership) in the 2005/06 campaign and with that success brought Dungannon Swifts Setanta cup football and the season after the club's first ever European outing against Icelandic Opposition.

David was also a key member of Roy Millar's Northern Ireland Under 21 squad for the 2005/06 season and retained his place for the European qualifiers at the start of the new domestic season. Scullion is an attacking midfielder and finished his last season with the Swifts with 13 goals.

He joined Glentoran on 16 June 2007 for a fee believed to be around the £10,000 mark and scored 15 goals in 64 appearances in his time with the club.

On 23 February 2009 Scullion joined Derry City in a one-year deal on the last day of the League of Ireland transfer window.

In July 2010, David signed a 1-year deal with Irish Premier League side Coleraine

Scored in the Europa League in August 2009.

On 1 July 2013 Scullion rejoined Glentoran F.C. on a three-year contract. In February 2015, he signed a two-year contract extension. On 2 May 2015, Scullion scored the winning goal in the 2014-15 Irish Cup final to grant Glentoran their 22nd Cup win. In May 2016, he was transfer listed as a part of Alan Kernaghan restructuring of the squad.

He joined Larne F.C. in the autumn of 2017 and helped the club win the Championship title in 2018/19.

== Honours ==
Aston Villa

- FA Youth Cup: 2001–02

Glentoran

- Irish Cup: 2023–24
- Larne
- NIFL Championship (tier 2) (1): 2018–19
