= Paolo Tagliavento =

Italian football referee

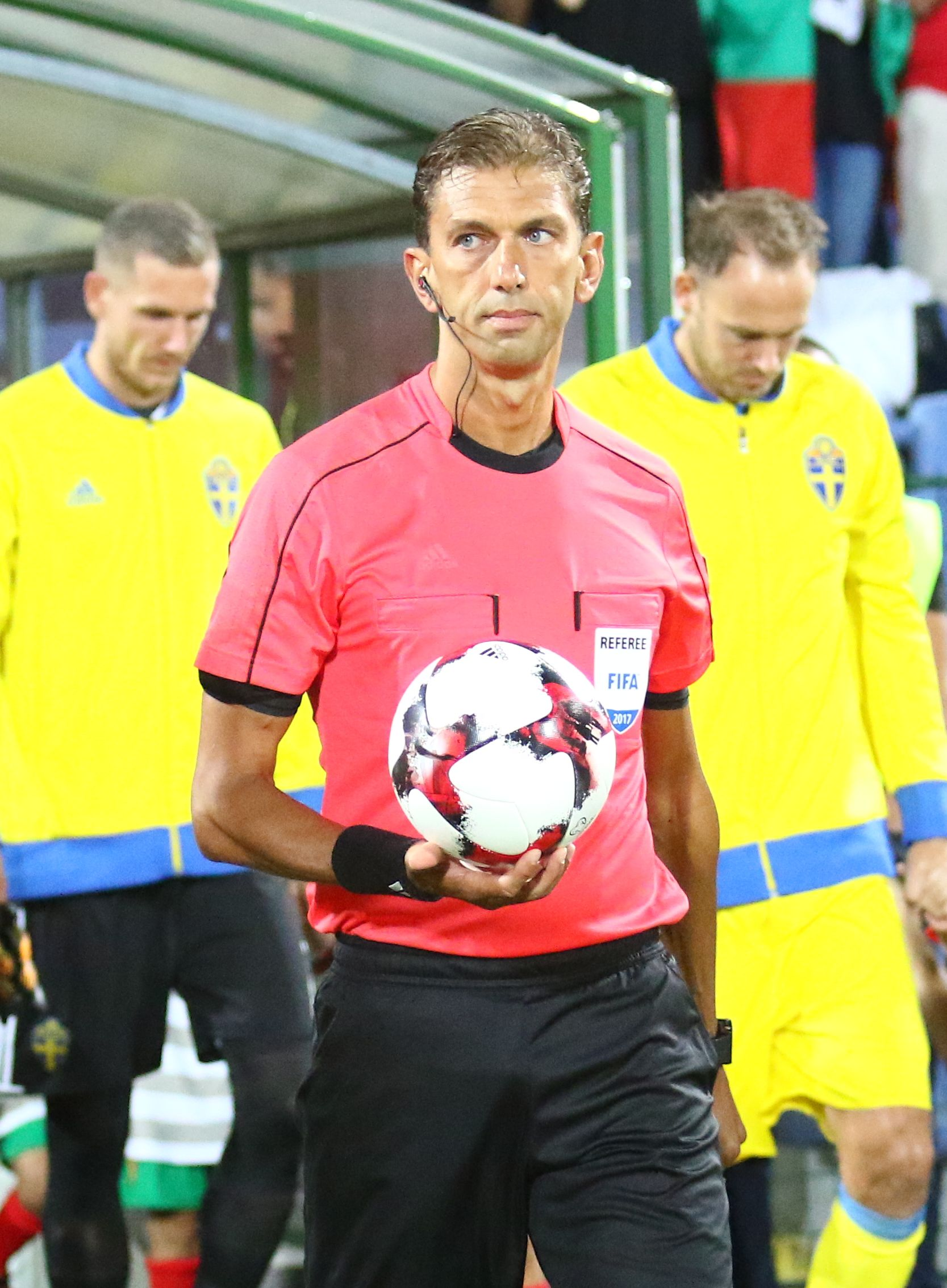
- Tagliavento in 2017
- Full name: Paolo Tagliavento
- Born: 19 September 1972 (age 54); Terni, Italy
- Other occupation: Hairdresser

Domestic
Years	League	Role
2003–2010	Serie B	Referee
2004–2018	Serie A	Referee

International
Years	League	Role
2006–2018	UEFA	Referee
2007–2017	FIFA listed	Referee

Paolo Tagliavento (Italian pronunciation: [ˈpaːolo taʎʎaˈvɛnto]; born 19 September 1972) is a former Italian association football referee officiated in the Serie A and UEFA competitions; namely the UEFA Champions League and UEFA Europa League.

== Career ==
=== Club ===
Tagliavento began refereeing in Serie A in 2004, officiating over 200 matches in his fourteen year career. In the Serie B he notched up over 80 games, whilst he also officiated Coppa Italia matches, as well as a relegation match in 2009.

On 8 December 2010, Tagliavento debuted as a referee in the UEFA Champions League, in a match between Arsenal and Partizan. He would go on to officiate over 20 additional Champions League games.

Tagliavento retired from refereeing on 30 May 2018.

On 3 July 2018, Tagliavento was named club manager of Ternana. After having been promoted to vice-chairman, on 18 June 2023 Tagliavento was named new Ternana chairman, following the election of club owner and chairman Stefano Bandecchi as mayor of Terni. He left the club a month later, after the club was sold to entrepreneur Nicola Guida.

=== International ===
Tagliavento officiated international friendlies, U-21 European qualifiers, as well as FIFA World Cup qualification matches in Europe. He was also a referee at the 2011 UEFA European Under-21 Championship.

International matches officiated

Date	Home	Away	Result	Competition
8 September 2007	Northern Ireland	Germany	0–3	2009 UEFA U-21 Championship qualification
7 February 2008	Turkey	Sweden	0–0	Friendly
11 September 2008	Lithuania	Austria	2–0	2010 FIFA World Cup qualification
16 October 2008	France	Germany	0–1	2009 UEFA U-21 Championship qualification
7 June 2009	(North Macedonia) Macedonia	Norway	0–0	2010 FIFA World Cup qualification
12 August 2010	Slovenia	Australia	2–0	Friendly

== See also ==
- List of FIFA international referees
