= Moldova national under-21 football team =

National U-21 association football team

Moldova Under-21
- Nickname: Tricolorii mici (The Young Tricolours)
- Association: Moldovan Football Federation (FMF)
- Confederation: UEFA (Europe)
- Head coach: Serghei Cebotari
- Captain: Artiom Dijinari
- Home stadium: Various
- FIFA code: MDA
First colours	Second colours

First international
- Moldova 0–1 Belarus (Chișinău, Moldova; 30 August 1992)

Biggest win
- Moldova 5–1 Georgia (Valletta, Malta; 27 February 2006); Gibraltar 0–4 Moldova (Gibraltar; 29 March 2022)

Biggest defeat
- Greece 8–0 Moldova (Sparta, Greece; 23 October 1996)
- Website: fmf.md (in Romanian)

The Moldova national under-21 football team represents Moldova in international football at this age level and is controlled by the Moldovan Football Federation, the governing body for football in Moldova. The team is considered to be the feeder team for the senior Moldovan national football team. The team competes to qualify for the UEFA European Under-21 Championship, held every two years. Since the establishment of the Moldovan under-21 team, the under-21 side has never reached a final tournament of the UEFA European Under-21 Championship, but has produced many players, who have become regular internationals for the senior side. The team is coached by Serghei Cebotari.

This team is for Moldovan players aged 21 or under at the start of a two-year European Under-21 Championship campaign, so players can be, and often are, up to 23 years old. Players born on or after 1 January 2006 are eligible for the 2029 UEFA European Under-21 Championship qualification.

Moldova U21s began their first competitive campaign in 1994, in which they tried to qualify for the 1996 finals. They eventually finished fourth in a five-team group, with two wins out of eight games. The U-21 team plays its home matches in many different venues all around the country, including Chișinău, Nisporeni and Orhei.

== Results and fixtures ==
The following is a list of match results in the last 12 months, as well as any future matches that have been scheduled.

Win Draw Loss

=== 2025 ===
13 November 2025 Friendly	Moldova	0–1	Albania	Vadul lui Vodă, Moldova
		Report	Alili 18'	Stadium: Stadionul CPSM; Referee: Dumitru Muntean (Moldova)

17 November 2025 2027 UEFA Euro Under-21 qualifying	Kazakhstan	1–1	Moldova	Astana, Kazakhstan
	Bagdat 6'	Report	Rotaru 90' (pen.)	Stadium: Astana Arena; Attendance: 5,421; Referee: Pavle Ilić (Serbia)

=== 2026 ===
26 March 2026 2027 UEFA Euro Under-21 qualifying	Republic of Ireland	1–1	Moldova	Dublin, Republic of Ireland
	Mullins 26'	Report	Luchița 20'	Stadium: Tallaght Stadium; Attendance: 860; Referee: Walter Altmann (Austria)

31 March 2026 2027 UEFA Euro Under-21 qualifying	England	4–1	Moldova	Norwich, England
	Nwaneri 11', 73'; Gray 61'; Esse 82'	Report	Luchița 48'	Stadium: Carrow Road; Attendance: 11,547; Referee: Patryk Gryckiewicz (Poland)

4 June 2026 Friendly	Moldova	3–0	Malta	Orhei, Moldova
	Lupan 3'; Dijinari 40', 86'	Report		Stadium: CSR Orhei; Attendance: 300; Referee: Ion Orlic (Moldova)

9 June 2026 Friendly	Moldova	3–2	Georgia	Nisporeni, Moldova
	Lupan 45+2' (pen.); Luchița 48'; Radu 62'	Report	Kokhreidze 70'; Grigalava 73'	Stadium: Stadionul Central Nisporeni; Referee: Dumitru Muntean (Moldova)

2 October 2026 2027 UEFA Euro Under-21 qualifying	Andorra	0–0	Moldova	Andorra la Vella, Andorra
		Report		Stadium: Estadi Nacional; Attendance: 362; Referee: Aleko Aptsiauri (Georgia)

6 October 2026 2027 UEFA Euro Under-21 qualifying	Moldova	3–2	Kazakhstan	Nisporeni, Moldova
	Luchița 42'; Țurcan 72', 90'	Report	Popov 13'; Omatay 39'	Stadium: Stadionul Central Nisporeni; Attendance: 444; Referee: Christos Vergetis (Greece)

=== 2027 UEFA European Under-21 Championship qualification ===
==== Group D ====
Pos	Team	Pld	W	D	L	GF	GA	GD	Pts	Qualification
1	England	10	7	2	1	23	7	+16	23	Final tournament
2	Republic of Ireland	10	6	2	2	16	14	+2	20 (Note: Head-to-head points: Republic of Ireland 4, Slovakia 1.)	Play-offs
3	Slovakia	10	6	2	2	17	13	+4	20	
4	Moldova	10	2	3	5	12	19	−7	9	
5	Andorra	10	2	2	6	7	12	−5	8	
6	Kazakhstan	10	1	1	8	11	21	−10	4	

Source: UEFA

== Coaching staff ==
=== Current coaching staff ===
Position	Staff
Head coach	(Moldova) Serghei Cebotari
Assistant coach	(Moldova) Stanislav Luca
Goalkeeping coach	(Moldova) Igor Josan
Fitness coach	(Moldova) Victor Martin

Last updated: 17 March 2026
Source: FMF

=== Manager history ===
Coach	Nat.	Period
Anatol Teslev	(Moldova)	1995–1996
Alexandru Spiridon	(Moldova)	2000–2001
Alexandru Guzun	(Moldova)	2002–2003
Vladimir Vusatîi	(Moldova)	2003–2004
Boris Tropaneț	(Moldova)	2004–2007
Ilie Carp	(Moldova)	2007–2008
Sergiu Chirilov	(Moldova)	2008–2011
Alexandru Curtianu	(Moldova)	2011–2014
Igor Ursachi	(Moldova)	2014–2015
Dănuț Oprea	(Romania)	2015–2017
Serghei Cleșcenco	(Moldova)	2019–2020
Alexandru Guzun	(Moldova)	2020
Ștefan Stoica	(Romania)	2021–2025
Serghei Cebotari	(Moldova)	2025–

== Players ==
=== Current squad ===
The following players were selected for the 2027 UEFA Euro U21 qualifying matches against Andorra and Kazakhstan on 2 and 6 October 2026, respectively.

Caps and goals are correct as of 6 October 2026, after the match against Kazakhstan.

No.	Pos.	Player	Date of birth (age)	Caps	Goals	Club
1	GK	Artur Nazarciuc	6 January 2004 (age 22)	6	0	(Moldovan Football Federation) Bălți
12	GK	Roman Dumenco	30 July 2004 (age 22)	10	0	(Moldovan Football Federation) Dacia Buiucani
2	DF	Daniel Cucer	1 September 2006 (age 20)	0	0	(Moldovan Football Federation) Politehnica UTM
3	DF	Ivan Graminschii	5 February 2007 (age 19)	6	0	(Football Association of Ireland) St Patrick's Athletic Academy
4	DF	Daniel Tonica	31 July 2007 (age 19)	5	0	(Italian Football Federation) Torino Primavera
5	DF	Artiom Dijinari (captain)	26 October 2005 (age 21)	19	2	(Moldovan Football Federation) Dacia Buiucani
14	DF	Petar Gospodinov	9 March 2005 (age 21)	11	0	(Bulgarian Football Union) Septemvri Sofia
15	DF	Cristian Gonța	1 January 2006 (age 20)	1	0	(Moldovan Football Federation) Zimbru Chișinău
18	DF	Vlad Coliș	24 January 2004 (age 22)	12	0	(Moldovan Football Federation) Dacia Buiucani
6	MF	Vladislav Costin	24 February 2004 (age 22)	14	4	(Moldovan Football Federation) Sheriff Tiraspol
7	MF	Lucian Radu	1 November 2005 (age 21)	12	1	(Moldovan Football Federation) Real Sireți
8	MF	Vasile Luchița	16 July 2004 (age 22)	10	4	(Moldovan Football Federation) Milsami Orhei
16	MF	Alexandru Mardari	31 May 2006 (age 20)	2	0	(Moldovan Football Federation) Politehnica UTM
17	MF	Serghei Țurcan	27 July 2004 (age 22)	9	2	(Moldovan Football Federation) Dacia Buiucani
19	MF	Gheorghe Moșneagu	30 April 2007 (age 19)	4	0	(Football Association of Ireland) Shelbourne Academy
20	MF	Victor Ciumașu	24 June 2005 (age 21)	8	0	(Moldovan Football Federation) Dacia Buiucani
9	FW	Alexandru Bețivu	21 June 2007 (age 19)	1	0	(Moldovan Football Federation) Zimbru Chișinău
10	FW	Mihai Lupan	8 September 2004 (age 22)	24	5	(Moldovan Football Federation) Petrocub Hîncești
11	FW	Dan-Angelo Boțan	19 February 2005 (age 21)	11	0	(Moldovan Football Federation) Sheriff Tiraspol
13	FW	Cristian Nagurnea	31 August 2005 (age 21)	2	0	(Moldovan Football Federation) Dacia Buiucani

=== Recent call-ups ===
Players born in or after 2004 are eligible for the 2027 UEFA European Under-21 Championship.

The following players have also been called up in the past to the Moldova under-21 squad and remain eligible to play in the qualification matches for 2027 UEFA European Under-21 Championship:

Pos.	Player	Date of birth (age)	Caps	Goals	Club	Latest call-up
GK	Pavel Socolov	10 October 2006 (age 20)	0	0	(Moldova) Politehnica UTM	v. Kazakhstan, 6 October 2026 ^{PRE}
GK	Ciprian Tuhar	13 October 2005 (age 21)	0	0	(Moldova) Dacia Buiucani	v. Georgia, 9 June 2026
GK	Daniel Vîrlan	18 September 2005 (age 21)	2	0	(Moldova) Spartanii Sportul	v. Kazakhstan, 17 November 2025
GK	Victor Dodon	1 March 2004 (age 22)	6	0	(Moldova) Petrocub Hîncești	v. Slovakia, 14 October 2025
DF	David Sîrbu	31 August 2006 (age 20)	5	0	(Moldova) Milsami Orhei	v. Andorra, 2 October 2026 ^{PRE}
DF	Matteo Obleac	23 June 2006 (age 20)	6	0	(Italy) Casarano	v. Andorra, 2 October 2026 ^{PRE}
DF	Nichita Lipcan	4 October 2007 (age 19)	1	0	(Moldova) Politehnica UTM	v. Georgia, 9 June 2026
DF	Vladislav Boico	14 September 2006 (age 20)	2	0	(Moldova) Zimbru Chișinău	v. Georgia, 9 June 2026
DF	Vlad Pascari	14 September 2006 (age 20)	2	0	(Moldova) Petrocub Hîncești	v. England, 31 March 2026
DF	Leo Saca	3 January 2007 (age 19)	13	0	(Romania) CFR Cluj	v. England, 31 March 2026
DF	Danil Andreiciu	11 September 2006 (age 20)	5	0	(Moldova) Politehnica UTM	v. Kazakhstan, 17 November 2025
DF	Pavel Nazari	12 June 2005 (age 21)	4	0	(Moldova) Petrocub Hîncești	v. Kazakhstan, 17 November 2025
DF	Maxim Cononenco	1 August 2005 (age 21)	1	0	Free agent	v. Albania, 13 November 2025
DF	Denis Gușpit	30 April 2006 (age 20)	0	0	(Moldova) Oguz Comrat	v. England, 10 October 2025 ^{PRE}
MF	Nicolae Covalschi	17 April 2004 (age 22)	2	0	(Moldova) Real Sireți	v. Andorra, 2 October 2026 ^{PRE}
MF	Cristian Păscăluță	8 September 2005 (age 21)	15	0	(England) Leyton Orient	v. Georgia, 9 June 2026
MF	Vadim Bejenaru	28 February 2007 (age 19)	0	0	(Switzerland) Paradiso II	v. Malta, 4 June 2026 ^{PRE}
MF	Ovidiu David	24 October 2006 (age 20)	10	0	(Moldova) Petrocub Hîncești	v. England, 31 March 2026
MF	Ștefan Bîtca	25 September 2005 (age 21)	8	0	(Moldova) Sheriff Tiraspol	v. Slovakia, 14 October 2025
FW	Artur Sprinsean	21 January 2006 (age 20)	2	0	(Moldova) Politehnica UTM	v. Andorra, 2 October 2026 ^{PRE}
FW	Nicolae Rotaru	19 December 2005 (age 20)	12	4	(Hungary) ETO Győr	v. Andorra, 2 October 2026 ^{INJ}
FW	Veaceslav Cozma	1 March 2005 (age 21)	11	0	(Moldova) Sheriff Tiraspol	v. Georgia, 9 June 2026
FW	Nichita Caragheorghi	4 October 2007 (age 19)	4	0	(Moldova) Zimbru-2 Chișinău	v. Georgia, 9 June 2026
FW	Igor Sava	24 March 2006 (age 20)	1	0	(Spain) Leganés B	v. Georgia, 9 June 2026
FW	Nicolae Țelic	26 February 2004 (age 22)	6	0	(Moldova) Spartanii Sportul	v. Georgia, 9 June 2026
FW	Cristian Antonciuc	12 February 2006 (age 20)	3	0	Free agent	v. England, 31 March 2026
FW	Eduard Creciun	9 November 2005 (age 21)	2	0	(Moldova) Edineț	v. Albania, 13 November 2025
FW	Vlad Lupașco	11 February 2005 (age 21)	14	0	(Moldova) Dacia Buiucani	v. Slovakia, 14 October 2025
^{INJ} Withdrew due to injury^{PRE} Preliminary squad / standby^{SUS} Serving suspension^{WD} Player withdrew from the squad due to non-injury issue.

== Competition history ==
=== UEFA European Under-21 Championship ===
- 1978 to 1992 – see Soviet Union

UEFA U-21 European Championship										UEFA U-21 Qualification record							
Year	Round	Position	Pld	W	D	L	GF	GA	Squad	Pld	W	D	L	GF	GA	Campaign	
(Spain) 1996	Did not qualify									8	2	2	4	5	11	1996	
(Romania) 1998	Did not qualify									8	1	1	6	5	17	1998	
(Slovakia) 2000	Did not qualify									8	0	4	4	3	10	2000	
(Switzerland) 2002	Did not qualify									10	2	3	5	6	13	2002	
(Germany) 2004	Did not qualify									8	0	2	6	3	14	2004	
(Portugal) 2006	Did not qualify									10	3	2	5	8	12	2006	
(Netherlands) 2007	Did not qualify									4	1	2	1	4	5	2007	2007
(Sweden) 2009	Did not qualify									8	4	0	4	6	8	2009	
(Denmark) 2011	Did not qualify									10	4	2	4	9	13	2011	
(Israel) 2013	Did not qualify									8	2	1	5	10	24	2013	
(Czech Republic) 2015	Did not qualify									10	5	1	4	12	6	2015	
(Poland) 2017	Did not qualify									10	2	1	7	8	18	2017	
(Italy) (San Marino) 2019	Did not qualify									10	2	1	7	8	23	2019	
(Hungary) (Slovenia) 2021	Did not qualify									8	2	1	5	6	22	2021	
(Georgia (country)) (Romania) 2023	Did not qualify									10	3	3	4	7	12	2023	
(Slovakia) 2025	Did not qualify									10	2	1	7	7	20	2025	
(Albania) (Serbia) 2027	Did not qualify									10	2	3	5	12	19	2027	
Total	0/17									150	37	30	83	119	247		

== Head-to-head record ==
Friendly games are not included and correct as of last competitive match played on 6 October 2026.

Opponents	Pld	W	D	L	GF	GA	GD
Albania	2	1	0	1	5	5	0
Andorra	4	3	1	0	7	1	+6
Armenia	0	0	0	0	0	0	0
Austria	2	0	0	2	0	2	−2
Azerbaijan	2	1	1	0	1	0	+1
Belarus	6	2	1	3	8	12	−4
Belgium	4	1	0	3	3	8	−5
Bosnia and Herzegovina	2	0	1	1	1	5	−4
Bulgaria	4	0	2	2	0	4	−4
Croatia	2	0	0	2	0	7	−7
Cyprus	0	0	0	0	0	0	0
Czechia	6	0	0	6	3	16	−13
Denmark	0	0	0	0	0	0	0
England	7	0	1	6	3	17	−14
Estonia	0	0	0	0	0	0	0
Faroe Islands	2	1	1	0	2	1	+1
Finland	4	1	1	2	2	3	−1
France	0	0	0	0	0	0	0
Georgia	6	1	1	4	2	9	−7
Germany	8	1	1	6	4	20	−16
Gibraltar	4	3	0	1	9	3	+6
Greece	2	0	0	2	1	7	−6
Hungary	0	0	0	0	0	0	0
Iceland	0	0	0	0	0	0	0
Ireland	2	0	1	1	2	3	−1
Israel	2	1	0	1	1	1	0
Italy	4	0	0	4	0	11	−11
Kazakhstan	4	2	2	0	5	3	+2
Kosovo	0	0	0	0	0	0	0
Latvia	4	2	1	1	4	4	0
Liechtenstein	0	0	0	0	0	0	0
Lithuania	2	2	0	0	6	0	+6
Luxembourg	2	2	0	0	4	0	+4
Malta	2	0	1	1	2	3	−1
Montenegro	2	1	0	1	1	1	0
Netherlands	6	0	2	4	2	14	−12
North Macedonia	4	2	0	2	6	5	+1
Northern Ireland	4	0	2	2	1	5	−4
Norway	2	1	0	1	3	4	−1
Poland	4	2	0	2	8	8	0
Portugal	2	0	0	2	0	7	−7
Romania	2	0	0	2	0	4	−4
Russia	4	0	1	3	3	14	−11
San Marino	4	4	0	0	8	0	+8
Scotland	2	0	2	0	0	0	0
Serbia	0	0	0	0	0	0	0
Slovakia	4	0	1	3	2	8	−6
Slovenia	2	0	0	2	1	4	−3
Spain	0	0	0	0	0	0	0
Sweden	4	0	1	3	0	9	−9
Switzerland	3	0	1	2	2	7	−5
Turkey	4	0	2	2	3	6	−3
Ukraine	0	0	0	0	0	0	0
Wales	8	3	2	3	4	6	−2
Total	150	37	30	83	119	247	−128

== See also ==
- Moldova national football team
- Moldova national under-19 football team
- Moldova national under-17 football team
