= 2007 UEFA European Under-21 Championship qualification group stage =

Football tournament qualification stage

The qualification group stage matches were played from 15 August to 6 September 2006. Winners of the group stage were advanced to the play-offs.

== Group 1 ==
Team	Pld	W	D	L	GF	GA	GD	Pts
Bosnia and Herzegovina	2	1	1	0	4	3	+1	4
Armenia	2	1	0	1	3	3	0	3
Norway	2	0	1	1	1	2	−1	1

16 August 2006
17:00

Bosnia and Herzegovina	3 – 2	Armenia
Ibričić 16'; Džeko 38'; Vršajević 82'	Report	Petrosyan 12'; Ghazaryan 90+2'

Bilino Polje, Zenica
Referee: Radek Matějek (Czech Republic)

2 September 2006
14:00

Armenia	1 – 0	Norway
Gharabaghtsyan 22'	Report

Republican Stadium, Yerevan
Referee: Albert Toussaint (Luxembourg)

6 September 2006
17:00

Norway	1 – 1	Bosnia and Herzegovina
Johannesen 24'	Report	Ibišević 79'

Viking Stadion, Stavanger
Referee: Igor Zakharov (Russia)

== Group 2 ==
Team	Pld	W	D	L	GF	GA	GD	Pts
Spain	2	2	0	0	7	2	+5	6
Slovakia	2	0	1	1	2	4	−2	1
Albania	2	0	1	1	0	3	−3	1

16 August 2006
19:00

Slovakia	0 – 0	Albania
	Report

NTC Senec, Senec
Referee: Veaceslav Banari (Moldova)

1 September 2006
15:30

Albania	0 – 3	Spain
	Report	Silva 40', 72'; Kepa 57'

Selman Stërmasi Stadium, Tirana
Referee: Siniša Zrnić (Bosnia and Herzegovina)

5 September 2006
22:00

Spain	4 – 2	Slovakia
Kepa 59'; Valera 87'; Soldado 88'; Silva 90+1'	Report	Kopúnek 25'; Jendrišek 77'

Estadio Luis Suner, Alzira
Referee: Bülent Demirlek (Turkey)

== Group 3 ==
Team	Pld	W	D	L	GF	GA	GD	Pts
Serbia	2	2	0	0	5	1	+4	6
Lithuania	2	1	0	1	1	2	−1	3
Georgia	2	0	0	2	1	4	−3	0

16 August 2006
18:00

Lithuania	1 – 0	Georgia
Panka 14' (pen.)	Report

S. Darius and S. Girėnas Stadium, Kaunas
Referee: Petteri Kari (Finland)

3 September 2006
18:30

Georgia	1 – 3	Serbia
Iashvili 45'	Report	Mrđa 17'; Babović 45+1'; Milovanović 66' (pen.)

Mikheil Meskhi Stadium, Tbilisi
Referee: Serbastian Coltescu (Romania)

6 September 2006
17:00

Serbia	2 – 0	Lithuania
Janković 29'; Smiljanić 65'	Report

Stadion Vojvodine, Novi Sad
Referee: Asaf Kenan (Israel)

== Group 4 ==
Team	Pld	W	D	L	GF	GA	GD	Pts
Belgium	2	2	0	0	3	1	+2	6
Republic of Ireland	2	1	0	1	2	1	+1	3
Greece	2	0	0	2	1	4	−3	0

16 August 2006
19:00

Greece	0 – 2	Republic of Ireland
	Report	McShane 10'; Whelan 52'

Panionios Stadium, Athens
Referee: Ivan Bebek (Croatia)

1 September 2006
20:30

Republic of Ireland	0 – 1	Belgium
	Report	Martens 58'

Terryland Park, Galway
Referee: Per Ivar Staberg (Norway)

6 September 2006
20:30

Belgium	2 – 1	Greece
Haroun 69', 88'	Report	Vandelannoite 67' (o.g.)

Olympisch Stadion, Antwerp
Referee: Peter Sippel (Germany)

== Group 5 ==
Team	Pld	W	D	L	GF	GA	GD	Pts
Italy	2	2	0	0	2	0	+2	6
Austria	2	0	1	1	0	1	−1	1
Iceland	2	0	1	1	0	1	−1	1

16 August 2006
17:00

Austria	0 – 0	Iceland
	Report

Sonnenseestadion, Ritzing
Referee: Tsvetan Georgiev (Bulgaria)

1 September 2006
21:00

Iceland	0 – 1	Italy
	Report	Montolivo 56'

Laugardalsvöllur, Reykjavík
Referee: Anders Hermansen (Denmark)

5 September 2006
21:00

Italy	1 – 0	Austria
Montolivo 83'	Report

T. Morgnani, Forlì
Referee: Pavel Královec (Czech Republic)

== Group 6 ==
Team	Pld	W	D	L	GF	GA	GD	Pts
Russia	2	2	0	0	8	2	+6	6
Hungary	2	1	0	1	6	3	+3	3
Finland	2	0	0	2	1	10	−9	0

16 August 2006
18:00

Hungary	5 – 0	Finland
Priskin 25', 78'; Feczesin 44', 81'; Balogh 72'	Report

Megyeri úti stadion, Újpest
Referee: Thomas Einwaller (Austria)

3 September 2006
18:00

Finland	1 – 5	Russia
Lampi 41'	Report	Bazhenov 3', 89'; Savin 53', 80'; Denisov 75'

Turku Stadium, Turku
Referee: Johny Ver Eecke (Belgium)

6 September 2006
14:00

Russia	3 – 1	Hungary
Denisov 21'; Bazhenov 54', 76'	Report	Feczesin 84'

Eduard Streltsov Stadium, Moscow
Referee: Daniel Stålhammar (Sweden)

== Group 7 ==
Team	Pld	W	D	L	GF	GA	GD	Pts
Portugal	2	2	0	0	4	0	+4	6
Poland	2	1	0	1	3	3	0	3
Latvia	2	0	0	2	1	5	−4	0

16 August 2006
17:30

Poland	3 – 1	Latvia
Błaszczykowski 43'; Kucharski 50' (pen.); Szałachowski 90+2'	Report	Višņakovs 2'

Polonia Stadium, Warsaw
Attendance: 700
Referee: Sergiy Berezka (Ukraine)

1 September 2006
18:00

Latvia	0 – 2	Portugal
	Report	Varela 62'; Machado 88'

Daugava Stadium, Riga
Attendance: 500
Referee: Jérôme Laperrière (Switzerland)

5 September 2006
22:00

Portugal	2 – 0	Poland
da Costa 53'; Machado 56'	Report

Estàdio Dr. Jorge Sampaio, Vila Nova de Gaia
Attendance: 8322
Referee: Craig Alexander Thomson (Scotland)

== Group 8 ==
Team	Pld	W	D	L	GF	GA	GD	Pts
England	2	1	1	0	5	4	+1	4
Switzerland	2	1	0	1	5	4	+1	3
Moldova	2	0	1	1	3	5	−2	1

15 August 2006
21:00

England	2 – 2	Moldova
Walcott 3'; Nugent 76'	Report	Alexeev 75'; Zislis 86'

Portman Road, Ipswich
Referee: Vusal Aliyev (Azerbaijan)

1 September 2006
18:00

Moldova	1 – 3	Switzerland
Suvorov 47'	Report	Džemaili 13', 19'; Estéban 28'

Sheriff Stadium, Tiraspol
Referee: Manuel Jorge De Sousa (Portugal)

6 September 2006
19:30

Switzerland	2 – 3	England
Vonlanthen 29' (pen.); Barnetta 70'	Report	Walcott 13'; Nugent 19'; Milner 88'

Stadion Allmend, Lucerne
Referee: Stéphane Lannoy (France)

== Group 9 ==
Team	Pld	W	D	L	GF	GA	GD	Pts
Czech Republic	2	2	0	0	4	1	+3	6
Belarus	2	1	0	1	2	2	0	3
Cyprus	2	0	0	2	0	3	−3	0

16 August 2006
17:00

Belarus	1 – 0	Cyprus
Pavlyuchek 72'	Report

City Stadium, Borisov
Attendance: 4,000
Referee: Pavel Olšiak (Slovakia)

2 September 2006
18:00

Cyprus	0 – 2	Czech Republic
	Report	Dimitriou 16' (o.g.); Holenda 66'

Dasaki Stadium, Akhna
Attendance: 200
Referee: Kevin Blom (Netherlands)

6 September 2006
16:30

Czech Republic	2 – 1	Belarus
Frejlach 68', 85'	Report	Kovel 90+3'

Městský fotbalový stadion, Uherské Hradiště
Attendance: 1,305
Referee: David McKeon (Ireland)

== Group 10 ==
Team	Pld	W	D	L	GF	GA	GD	Pts
Germany	2	2	0	0	8	3	+5	6
Romania	2	1	0	1	4	5	−1	3
Northern Ireland	2	0	0	2	2	6	−4	0

16 August 2006
17:00

Romania	3 – 0	Northern Ireland
Pulhac 33'; Keserü 41'; Florescu 84' (pen.)	Report

Stadionul Tineretului, Urziceni
Referee: Christoforos Zografos (Greece)

1 September 2006
20:30

Northern Ireland	2 – 3	Germany
Shiels 69' (pen.); Stewart 81'	Report	Hilbert 13'; Helmes 36'; Trochowski 66'

Mourneview Park, Lurgan
Referee: Peter Rasmussen (Denmark)

5 September 2006
20:20

Germany	5 – 1	Romania
Gómez 13'; Helmes 19', 40'; Castro 78'; Hunt 84'	Report	Pulhac 74'

Jadestadion, Wilhelmshaven
Referee: Serge Gumienny (Belgium)

== Group 11 ==
Team	Pld	W	D	L	GF	GA	GD	Pts
Sweden	2	2	0	0	5	1	+4	6
Denmark	2	1	0	1	3	2	+1	3
Macedonia	2	0	0	2	1	6	−5	0

16 August 2006
18:30

Sweden	3 – 1	Macedonia
Goitom 15', 83'; Farnerud 65'	Report	Ivanovski 81'

Tingvalla IP, Karlstad
Referee: Andrejs Sipailo (Latvia)

2 September 2006
20:00

Macedonia	0 – 3	Denmark
	Report	Curth 21', 69'; Lorentzen 50'

Gradski stadion, Skopje
Referee: Panayiotis Kailis (Cyprus)

5 September 2006
19:00

Denmark	0 – 2	Sweden
	Report	Holmén 84'; Zengin 89'

Farum Park, Farum
Referee: Mark Clattenburg (England)

== Group 12 ==
Team	Pld	W	D	L	GF	GA	GD	Pts
Bulgaria	2	2	0	0	5	1	+4	6
Ukraine	2	1	0	1	2	4	−2	3
Croatia	2	0	0	2	2	4	−2	0

16 August 2006
19:00

Ukraine	0 – 3	Bulgaria
	Report	Atanasov 43'; Bojinov 57', 64' (pen.)

Bannikov Stadium, Kyiv
Referee: Mark Whitby (Wales)

3 September 2006
18:00

Bulgaria	2 – 1	Croatia
Bojinov 53'; Popov 81'	Report	Brkljača 58' (pen.)

Balgarska Armiya Stadium, Sofia
Referee: Martin Atkinson (England)

6 September 2006
20:30

Croatia	1 – 2	Ukraine
Bušić 61'	Report	Feshchuk 29'; Yatsenko 84'

Stadion Kantrida, Rijeka
Referee: Viktor Kassai (Hungary)

== Group 13 ==
Team	Pld	W	D	L	GF	GA	GD	Pts
Israel	2	1	1	0	3	2	+1	4
Turkey	2	0	2	0	0	0	0	2
Wales	2	0	1	1	2	3	−1	1

16 August 2006
15:00

Israel	3 – 2	Wales
Tamuz 26'; Srur 64'; Refaelov 79' (pen.)	Report	Williams 60', 66'

Mandemakers Stadion, Waalwijk
Referee: Paulius Malžinskas (Lithuania)

2 September 2006
16:00

Wales	0 – 0	Turkey
	Report

Ninian Park, Cardiff
Referee: Dragomir Tanović (Serbia)

6 September 2006
18:00

Turkey	0 – 0	Israel
	Report

19 Mayıs Stadium, Ankara
Referee: Damir Skomina (Slovenia)

== Group 14 ==
Team	Pld	W	D	L	GF	GA	GD	Pts
France	2	2	0	0	5	1	+4	6
Slovenia	2	1	0	1	1	2	−1	3
Scotland	2	0	0	2	1	4	−3	0

16 August 2006
17:00

Slovenia	1 – 0	Scotland
Burgič 56'	Report

Fazanerija City Stadium, Murska Sobota
Referee: Marek Mikołajewski (Poland)

1 September 2006
20:45

Scotland	1 – 3	France
Adam 86' (pen.)	Report	Briand 3', 83'; Zubar 16'

Pittodrie Stadium, Aberdeen
Referee: Tiziano Pieri (Italy)

5 September 2006
20:30

France	2 – 0	Slovenia
Gourcuff 65'; Sinama Pongolle 80'	Report

Stade de la Licorne, Amiens
Referee: Cristian Balaj (Romania)
