= Charlie Allen (footballer, born 2003) =

Northern Irish footballer

Personal information
- Full name: Charlie Steven Allen
- Date of birth: 22 November 2003 (age 22)
- Place of birth: Carrickfergus, Northern Ireland
- Height: 1.85 m (6 ft 1 in)
- Positions: Attacking midfielder; forward

Team information
- Current team: Linfield
- Number: 10

Youth career
- Linfield

Senior career*
Years	Team	Apps	(Gls)
2019–2020	Linfield	4	(0)
2020–2024	Leeds United	0	(0)
2024	→ York City (loan)	4	(0)
2024–	Linfield	43	(4)

International career^{‡}
2018	Northern Ireland U16	3	(0)
2018–2019	Northern Ireland U17	4	(1)
2021	Northern Ireland U19	3	(0)
2022–2024	Northern Ireland U21	14	(3)
- * Club domestic league appearances and goals as of 29 April 2026 ‡ National team caps and goals as of 10:14, 13 June 2025 (UTC)

Charlie Steven Allen (born 22 November 2003) is a Northern Irish footballer who plays as a midfielder or forward for Linfield and the Northern Ireland Under-21 team.

== Club career ==
=== Linfield ===
Having progressed through the academy of local club Linfield, Allen made his senior debut for the club on 27 April 2019 in a 1–1 draw with Coleraine. Upon making his debut, aged 15 years, five months and five days, he became the club's youngest debutant and set teammate Daniel Reynolds up for Linfield's goal.

He was named in Linfield's 25 man Champions League squad against Rosenborg BK by manager David Healy.

=== Leeds United ===
On 27 July 2020, the Yorkshire Evening Post revealed that Allen had agreed a deal with newly-promoted Premier League side Leeds United. The move was officially announced on 11 August, with Allen signing a three-year deal. Allen made his competitive debut for Leeds by playing for Leeds United Under 21's playing in the EFL Trophy defeat against Accrington Stanley on 8 September 2020, Allen was given the squad number 70 for the 2020–21 Leeds United season. He signed his first professional contract with Leeds United in December 2020, agreeing a deal lasting until summer 2023. In August 2022 his contract was extended to the end of the 2023–24 season. On 19 February 2024, Allen joined National League side York City on an initial one-month loan before being cut short.

Allen was released by Leeds in June 2024 at the conclusion of his contract.

=== Return to Linfield ===
On 9 August 2024, Allen returned to NIFL Premiership side Linfield on a two-year contract.

== Career statistics ==
As of match played 29 July 2020

Appearances and goals by club, season and competition
Club	Season	League			National Cup		League Cup		Continental		Total	
Club	Season	Division	Apps	Goals	Apps	Goals	Apps	Goals	Apps	Goals	Apps	Goals
Linfield	2018–19	NIFL Premiership	1	0	0	0	0	0	0	0	1	0
Linfield	2019–20	NIFL Premiership	3	0	0	0	1	0	1 (Note: Appearances and goals in Unite the Union Champions Cup)	0	5	0
Linfield	Total		4	0	0	0	1	0	1	0	6	0
Leeds United	2020–21	Premier League	0	0	0	0	0	0	0	0	0	0
Career total			4	0	0	0	1	0	1	0	6	0
