= Steve Beaglehole =

English football manager

Personal information
- Full name: Steven Beaglehole
- Date of birth: 17 October 1960 (age 66)

Managerial career
- Years: Team
- 1991-1993: Doncaster Rovers

Steven Beaglehole (born 17 October 1960) is an English football coach who is currently working at Leicester City with youth squads. He managed Doncaster Rovers from 1991 to 1993.

== Playing career ==
Beaglehole's playing career included appearances for England at Under-18 and Under-19 level and he turned out in the reserves for Barnsley and Sheffield United.

== Coaching career ==
Beaglehole holds a degree in Sports Science and is also a qualified Physical Education teacher. He became the youngest person to obtain the 'A' licence badge at the age of 21.

His managerial experience included leading the Doncaster Rovers, his hometown team, between 1991 and 1993. He joined Leicester City in October 2000 to work in the Academy and has worked with Jon Rudkin to recruit some strong young players.

After holding youth team coaching positions at Doncaster Rovers and Middlesbrough, Beaglehole became reserve team coach at Nottingham Forest and Leeds United, where he worked with Alan Hill, the former Leicester Academy Director.

He was promoted from youth coach after the departure of boss Billy Bremner and was one of the youngest managers in the league, younger even than some of his players. In his only full season in charge, the team finished five places higher in Division Three so progress had been made. One of his highlights there was guiding the team to the FA Youth Cup Final against Arsenal.

== Leicester City ==
Beaglehole worked as a youth coach under Martin O'Neill at Leicester in the late 1990s. Beaglehole remained at the club under subsequent managers and jointly took over as caretaker manager for one game, alongside Jon Rudkin and Mike Stowell, following Martin Allen's brief spell as manager in 2007. Rudkin, Stowell and Beaglehole would take charge of a further 3 games between Sven-Göran Eriksson leaving the club on 24 October 2011 and Nigel Pearson returning as manager on 15 November.

Beaglehole was appointed as manager of Northern Ireland's Under-21 and Under-19 teams on 12 June 2008. He continued as youth team and reserve team coach at Leicester City.

From the start of the 2012-2013 season Beaglehole took charge of Leicester City new 'development squad' which takes part in the Under-21 Professional Development League 2 North division. The team won 9 out of their first 12 games before Christmas 2012, sitting top of the league going into the new year. The team eventually went on to comfortably win the league with a game to go, but subsequently lost the national play-off semi-final to Cardiff City. Beaglehole and Jon Rudkin then took a team of under-21 and under-18 players to the end of season HKFC International Soccer Sevens tournament, winning the competition thanks to a 2-0 victory over Newcastle United in the final.

By January 2019 he was under-23 manager at Leicester City.
