= Matteo Valli =

Sammarinese footballer

Personal information
- Full name: Matteo Valli
- Date of birth: September 11, 1986 (age 40)
- Place of birth: San Marino, San Marino
- Height: 1.80 m (5 ft 11 in)
- Position: Striker

Team information
- Current team: S.P. Tre Penne

Senior career*
Years	Team	Apps	(Gls)
2005–2007	San Marino	9	(0)
2008–2009	Cesena	5	(1)
2009–2018	S.P. Tre Penne	136	(30)

International career
- San Marino U17
2002–2004	San Marino U19	1	(0)
2004–2009	San Marino U21	11	(4)
- * Club domestic league appearances and goals

Matteo Valli (born 11 September 1986) is a retired Sanmarinese football striker.

Valli briefly played professionally for San Marino Calcio in Serie C2.

He scored for U-21 side against Lithuania U21, Bosnia-Herzegovina U-21, Spain U-21 and Armenia U-21.

He was not yet call up to qualifying round of 2009 edition

In 2010 FIFA World Cup qualification (UEFA), he appeared as unused against Northern Ireland and Czech Republic.

As in 2010 has won back all matches in a cup of Regions, for the basic national team and even could score one goal.

He was part of Tre Penne's squad to win San Marino's first game on international club level during the first qualifying round in the 2013–14 UEFA Champions League campaign, beating Shirak F.C. of Armenia 1–0.
