= Mo Harkin =

Northern Irish footballer (born 1979)

Personal information
- Full name: Maurice Harkin
- Date of birth: 16 August 1979 (age 47)
- Place of birth: Derry, Northern Ireland
- Position: Midfielder

Team information
- Current team: Walton and Hersham

Youth career
- –1996: Wycombe Wanderers

Senior career*
Years	Team	Apps	(Gls)
1996–2001	Wycombe Wanderers	53	(2)
2001	Carlisle United	4	(0)
2001–2002	Aldershot Town	2	(0)
2002	Nuneaton Borough	14	(1)
2002–2005	Crawley Town	?	(?)
2005	Forest Green Rovers	6	(0)
2005–2006	Lewes	?	(?)
2006–2008	Havant & Waterlooville	56	(3)
2008–2009	Eastbourne Borough	17	(1)
2009–2009	Farnborough	18	(1)
- Walton and Hersham
2009–2012;	Kingstonian	56	(1)
2011	→ Hanwell Town (loan)		(1)
2012–	Egham Town		

International career
2000–2001	Northern Ireland U21	9	(3)
- * Club domestic league appearances and goals

Maurice Harkin (born 16 August 1979) is a Northern Irish former footballer who played as a midfielder. Harkin has played international football for Northern Ireland at both youth and under-20 level.

== Wycombe Wanderers & Carlisle United ==
Started his playing career at Wycombe Wanderers when he was the first player to progress from the youth team in the summer of 1996. His first game was against Barnet in the second round of the 1996–97 F.A. Cup where he came on as a substitute in the 60th minute. His first goal did not arrive until 26 August 1997 with a 25-yard chip past the Fulham goalkeeper, a result that ended in a 4–4 draw. Between the 2000 and 2001 season, Harkin was called up to the Northern Ireland U21 team nine times, making his debut and scoring a goal as a substitute in the 2–1 win over Malta. Harkin was also on the score sheet in the 5–2 against Iceland. Local media stated that Aston Villa offered Wycombe £800,000 for Harkin, but the deal ended when he picked up an injury. At the end of the 2000–01 season, at the age of 21, the then manager, Lawrie Sanchez, decided not to renew his contract with the club stating that there was no future for him at Wycombe and maybe a fresh start at another club could restart his football career. Harkin signed with Carlisle on 20 August 2001 on a month deal but was not renewed.

== Non-League football ==
Harkin moved south and joined the Hampshire team of Aldershot Town, who were in the Isthmian League at the time. He only made 2 appearances before going north to Nuneaton Borough on 2 January 2002, before returning south to the Sussex team of Crawley Town in June 2002.

In 2005, he had a short stint at Forest Green Rovers before going to Lewes.

Mo joined his second Hampshire team, Havant & Waterlooville, in June 2006 who were playing in the Conference South. He made history for Havant by scoring the only goal in the 2007–08 1st round of the FA Cup against York City and sending them into the second round for the first time. He featured in the FA Cup fourth round tie against Liverpool at Anfield. Although Havant lost 5–2 to the Premier League outfit, he was the man on the match.

He joined the newly promoted Conference National side Eastbourne Borough in July 2008. on a free transfer. He made 6 starts for Eastbourne, scoring 1 goal. On Boxing Day, he suffered with a mystery vision problem whilst warming up against Lewes. Harkin was released by Eastbourne at the end of January 2009 transferring to Southern League Premier Division team Farnborough. | In August 2009 Harkin moved to Kingstonian With his first match being a 3–0 win over Hendon in an Isthmian Premier League match. During his time at Kingstonian he was loaned out to Hanwell Town
