= Roy Millar =

Northern Irish football administrator

Frederick Roy Millar is a Northern Irish football administrator. He is the Irish Football Association's director of coaching and former head coach of the Northern Ireland national under-21 football team. Born in Belfast, he previously played in the Irish League first for Portadown F.C. then for Cliftonville F.C. and finally finishing his playing career with Dundela F.C. in the old 'B' Division. Since joining the Irish FA in 1975 as a coach and as an international coach from 1982 Millar has at some point taken charge of all youth teams from Under-16 to Under-19 and also the Northern Ireland B team and the Northern Ireland Elite (Under-19) squad that takes part in the Milk Cup.

On 29 April 2008, the Irish FA announced a restructuring of their coaching framework with Millar stepping down from his role as Northern Ireland Under-21 coach due to retirement. At the same time Mal Donaghy and Kenny Shiels also left their positions as Under-19 and Under-17 teams respectively. Millar retained his position as Director of Coaching through to 2009.

Millar was appointed Member of the Order of the British Empire (MBE) in the 2010 New Year Honours "for services to Youth Football in Northern Ireland."
