= 1996 UEFA European Under-21 Championship =

Tournament details
- Host country: Spain
- Dates: 12 March – 31 May
- Teams: 8 (from 1 confederation)
- Venue: 1 (in 1 host city)

Final positions
- Champions: Italy (3rd title)
- Runners-up: Spain
- Third place: France
- Fourth place: Scotland

Tournament statistics
- Matches played: 12
- Goals scored: 28 (2.33 per match)
- Attendance: 197,229 (16,436 per match)
- Top scorer: (Spain) Raúl (3 goals)
- Best player: (Italy) Fabio Cannavaro

The 1996 UEFA European Under-21 Championship, which spanned two years (1994–96), had 44 entrants. After the quarter-finals stage, Spain were chosen as the hosts of the final stages, consisting of four matches in total. Italy U-21s won the competition for the third consecutive time.

== Format ==
No fewer than 13 newly independent nations competed for the first time – due mainly to the fall of Socialist rule in Europe in the early 1990s.

Russia, who competed in 1994 were joined by nine further former Soviet Union states: Armenia, Azerbaijan, Belarus, Estonia, Georgia, Latvia, Lithuania, Moldova and Ukraine.

The exclusion (for political reasons) of the team from Serbia and Montenegro, then known as the Federal Republic of Yugoslavia continued. Croatia, Slovenia and the Republic of Macedonia were three former states of Yugoslavia who did compete though.

Czechoslovakia became two separate nations – teams from the Czech Republic and Slovakia complete the list of new entrants.

The 44 national teams were divided into eight groups (four groups of 5 + four groups of 6). The group winners played off against each other on a two-legged home-and-away basis to determine the final four, one of whom would host the last four matches. The top five nations qualify for the Atlanta '96 Olympics.

== Qualification ==
=== List of qualified teams ===
Country	Qualified as	Previous appearances in tournament^{1}
France	Group 1 winner	5 (1982, 1984, 1986, **1988**, 1994)
Spain	Group 2 winner	5 (1982, 1984, **1986**, 1988, 1990)
Hungary	Group 3 winner	3 (1978, 1980, 1986)
Italy	Group 4 winner	9 (1978, 1980, 1982, 1984, 1986, 1988, 1990, **1992**, **1994**)
Czech Republic	Group 5 winner	6 (1978^{2}, 1980^{2}, 1988^{2}, 1990^{2}, 1992^{2}, 1994^{2})
Portugal	Group 6 winner	1 (1994)
Germany	Group 7 winner	3 (1982^{3}, 1990^{3}, 1992)
Scotland	Group 8 winner	4 (1980, 1982, 1984, 1988)

^{1} Bold indicates champion for that year
^{2} As Czechoslovakia
^{3} As West Germany

== Results ==
=== Quarter-finals ===
==== First leg ====
12 March 1996

Hungary	2–1	Scotland
Szanyó 14'; Zavadszky 79'	Report	Glass 34'

Üllői út, Budapest, Hungary
Attendance: 15,000
Referee: Ryszard Wójcik (Poland)

13 March 1996

Germany	0–0	France
	Report

Stadion an der Bremer Brücke, Osnabrück, Germany
Attendance: 20,000
Referee: Rune Pedersen (Norway)

13 March 1996

Portugal	1–0	Italy
Porfírio 18'	Report

Estádio da Luz, Lisbon, Portugal
Attendance: 29,774
Referee: Markus Merk (Germany)

13 March 1996

Spain	2–1	Czech Republic
Dani 28'; Roberto 41'	Report	Šmicer 50'

Estadio Nuevo Los Cármenes, Granada, Spain
Attendance: 17,000
Referee: Michel Piraux (Belgium)

==== Second leg ====
26 March 1996

Scotland	3–1	Hungary
Dailly 42'; Hamilton 84'; Donnelly 86'	Report	Egressy 30'

Easter Road, Edinburgh
Attendance: 9,143
Referee: Rune Pedersen (Norway)

26 March 1996

France	4–1	Germany
Pires 28', 32'; Maurice 41', 70'	Report	Nerlinger 76' (pen.)

Stade Saint-Symphorien, Metz, France
Attendance: 24,077
Referee: Pierluigi Pairetto (Italy)

27 March 1996

Italy	2–0	Portugal
Vieri 41'; Peixe 55' (o.g.)	Report

La Favorita, Palermo, Italy
Attendance: 16,543
Referee: David Elleray (England)

27 March 1996

Czech Republic	1–2	Spain
Vágner 54'	Report	Raúl 71', 89'

Velký strahovský stadion, Prague, Czech Republic
Attendance: 12,092
Referee: Alain Sars (France)

=== Semi-finals ===
28 May 1996
17:30

Italy	1–0	France
Totti 49'	Report

Estadi Olímpic de Montjuïc, Barcelona, Spain
Attendance: 1,500
Referee: Peter Mikkelsen (Denmark)

28 May 1996
20:00

Spain	2–1	Scotland
Óscar 26'; De la Peña 35'	Report	Marshall 28'

Estadi Olímpic de Montjuïc, Barcelona, Spain
Attendance: 15,500
Referee: Rune Pedersen (Norway)

=== Third-place play-off ===
31 May 1996

France	1–0	Scotland
Moreau 50'	Report

Estadi Olímpic de Montjuïc, Barcelona, Spain
Attendance: 2,000
Referee: Karol Ihring (Slovakia)

=== Final ===
31 May 1996

Italy	1–1 (a.e.t.)	Spain
Totti 11'	Report	Raúl 42'
Penalties
Panucci (penalty missed); Pistone (penalty scored); Fresi (penalty scored); Nesta (penalty scored); Morfeo (penalty scored)	4–2	(penalty missed) De la Peña; (penalty scored) De Pedro; (penalty scored) Aranzábal; (penalty missed) Raúl

Estadi Olímpic de Montjuïc, Barcelona, Spain
Attendance: 34,600
Referee: Günter Benkö (Austria)

== Goalscorers ==
3 goals

- (Spain) Raúl

2 goals

- (Italy) Francesco Totti
- (France) Florian Maurice
- (France) Robert Pires

1 goal

- (Czech Republic) Vladimír Šmicer
- (Czech Republic) Robert Vágner
- (France) Patrick Moreau
- (Germany) Christian Nerlinger
- (Hungary) Gábor Egressy
- (Hungary) Károly Szanyó
- (Hungary) Gábor Zavadszky
- (Italy) Christian Vieri
- (Portugal) Hugo Porfírio
- (Spain) Dani
- (Spain) Óscar
- (Spain) Iván de la Peña
- (Spain) Roberto Fresnedoso
- (Scotland) Christian Dailly
- (Scotland) Simon Donnelly
- (Scotland) Stephen Glass
- (Scotland) Jim Hamilton
- (Scotland) Scott Marshall

Own goal

- (Portugal) Emílio Peixe (playing against Italy)
- (Spain) Iñigo Idiakez (playing against Italy)

== Medal table and Olympic qualifiers ==
- France, Italy and Spain qualify for Olympic Games finals.
- Best losing quarter-finalists Hungary and Portugal also qualify.
- Scotland do not compete in the Olympic Football Tournament (See Great Britain Olympic football team).

Pos	Team	Pld	W	D	L	GF	GA	GD	Pts	Final result
1st place, gold medalist(s)	Italy	4	2	1	1	4	2	+2	5	Gold medal
2nd place, silver medalist(s)	Spain (H)	4	3	1	0	7	4	+3	7	Silver medal
3rd place, bronze medalist(s)	France	4	2	1	1	5	2	+3	5	Bronze medal
4	Scotland	4	1	0	3	5	6	−1	2	Fourth place
5	Hungary	2	1	0	1	3	4	−1	2	Eliminated in quarter-finals
6	Portugal	2	1	0	1	1	2	−1	2	Eliminated in quarter-finals
7	Germany	2	0	1	1	1	4	−3	1	Eliminated in quarter-finals
8	Czech Republic	2	0	0	2	2	4	−2	0	Eliminated in quarter-finals

Source: [ ]
(H) Hosts
