= Thomas Stewart (Irish footballer) =

Northern Irish footballer (born 1986)

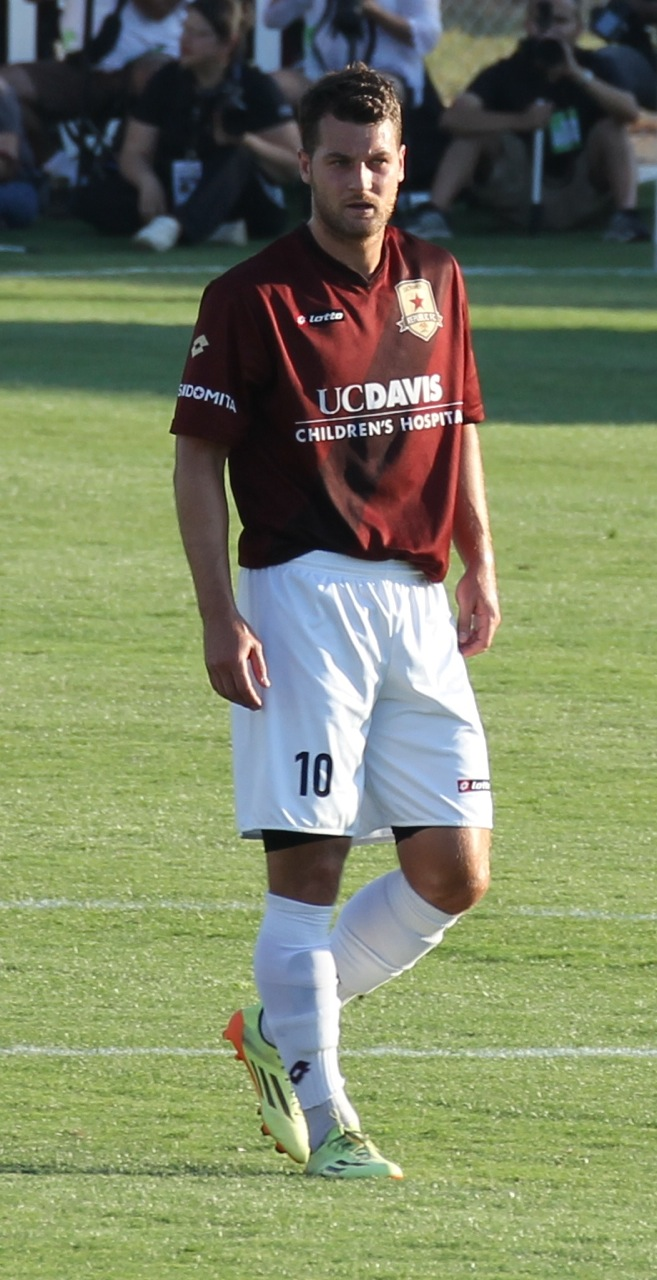

Personal information
- Full name: Thomas Stewart
- Date of birth: 12 November 1986 (age 39)
- Place of birth: Craigavon, Northern Ireland
- Height: 1.81 m (5 ft 11 in)
- Position: Forward

Team information
- Current team: IFK Norrköping (Assistant)

Youth career
- 2001–2003: Portadown
- 2003–2006: Wolverhampton Wanderers

Senior career*
Years	Team	Apps	(Gls)
2006–2008	Linfield	46	(16)
2008–2009	Derry City	43	(14)
2010	Shamrock Rovers	32	(10)
2011–2012	Partick Thistle	17	(6)
2012–2013	Shamrock Rovers	42	(11)
2014–2016	Sacramento Republic	47	(22)
2016	Ottawa Fury	17	(4)
2017	Dundalk	23	(6)
2018–2019	Larne	21	(11)
Total		288	(100)

International career
2006–2008	Northern Ireland U21	19	(4)
2007–2008	Northern Ireland U23	2	(0)
2007	Irish Football League XI	1	(0)

Managerial career
- 2023–2024: Ytterhogdals IK (Head Coach)
- 2025–: Sandvikens IF (Assistant)
- 2026: IFK Norrköping (Assistant)
- * Club domestic league appearances and goals

Thomas Stewart (born 12 November 1986) is a Northern Irish football coach and former player. Current assistant at IFK Norrköping. https://www.nt.se/sport/fotboll/artikel/nordirlandare-klar-for-ifk-aterforenas-med-abdulic/r90deyzr. He was manager of Swedish league side Ytterhogdals IK until November 2024.

Stewart became Assistant Head Coach in January 2025 with Sandvikens IF, in the Swedish Superettan league.

== Playing career ==
=== Derry City ===
Stewart signed for Stephen Kenny's Derry City in June 2008 on a two-and-a-half-year full-time contract. He made his debut in Sligo on 5 July. Stewart scored on his home debut the following week. He was the second opposition player to score at Tallaght Stadium in March 2009. He had a productive couple of seasons at the Brandywell winning the FAI League Cup and playing and scoring in the UEFA Europa League.

=== Shamrock Rovers ===
Despite agreeing terms with Carolina Railhawks in March 2010 the player returned home to sign for Shamrock Rovers. He made his debut against University College Dublin A.F.C. on 2 April. He scored Rovers' winner in the Europa League tie against Bnei Yehuda in July 2010 which set up the glamour tie against Italian giants Juventus. Stewart proved to be a big game player and in the last league game of the 2010 League of Ireland season he scored on the night Rovers secured their 16th domestic crown.

=== Return to Rovers ===
In July 2012 Stewart signed back for The Hoops scoring 11 times the following 2013 season.

=== Sacramento Republic ===
Stewart made the move to North America in 2014, signing with United Soccer League (3rd div.) club Sacramento Republic. In the 2014 season, he made 28 appearances and 17 starts in all competitions, scoring 13 goals and helping Sacramento to its first championship in its first-ever season.

In 2015 Stewart scored 8 goals in 24 appearances in all competitions, including 3 goals in 17 league appearances. That year he became the first Northern Irish player to score a hat-trick in the U.S. Open Cup, scoring three against Sonoma County Sol.

In 2016 Stewart scored 1 goal in 6 league starts for Sacramento with 2 assists.

=== Ottawa Fury ===
Stewart was transferred to the NASL's Ottawa Fury on 12 July 2016.

=== Dundalk ===
Stewart signed for Dundalk on 17 February 2017.

== Coaching career ==
Following the conclusion of his playing career, Stewart took up a managerial role with Swedish fourth division side Ytterhogdals IK.

In January 2025, Stewart became Assistant Head Coach of Sandvikens IF, in the Superettan league and finished the season in 10th place, qualifying for the 2026 Swedish Cup.

Stewart is currently Assistant at IFK Norrköping.

== Honours ==
Linfield

- Irish Premier League (2): 2006–07, 2007–08
- Irish Cup (2): 2006–07, 2007–08

Derry City

- League of Ireland Cup (1): 2008

Shamrock Rovers

- League of Ireland Premier Division (1): 2010
- Setanta Sports Cup (1): 2013

Dundalk

- League of Ireland Cup:
  - 2017

Sacramento Republic

• 2014 Championship Winner
