= Northern Ireland national under-21 football team =

Football team representing Northern Ireland

Northern Ireland Under-21
- Association: Irish Football Association
- Head coach: Tommy Wright
- Most caps: Liam Donnelly (24)
- Top scorer: Liam Donnelly; Shayne Lavery (5)
| First colours | Second colours |

First international
- Republic of Ireland 1–1 Northern Ireland (Phibsborough, Republic of Ireland; 8 March 1978)

Biggest win
- Northern Ireland 5–0 Luxembourg (Lurgan, Northern Ireland; 16 November 2007); Northern Ireland 5–0 Azerbaijan (Ballymena, Northern Ireland; 12 October 2024)

Biggest defeat
- Northern Ireland 0–6 Spain (Larne, Northern Ireland; 3 June 2022)

UEFA U-21 Championship
- Appearances: 0

The Northern Ireland national under-21 football team also known as the Northern Ireland under-21s or Northern Ireland U21s, is the national under-21 football team of Northern Ireland and is controlled by the Irish Football Association. The team competes in the UEFA European Under-21 Football Championship, held every two years. To date Northern Ireland haven't yet qualified for the finals tournament.

The national under-21 team is the highest level of youth football in Northern Ireland, and is open to any players who were born in Northern Ireland or whose parents or grandparents were born in Northern Ireland. This team is for Northern Irish players aged 21 or under at the start of a two-year European Under-21 Football Championship campaign, so players can be, and often are, up to 23 years old. As long as they are eligible, players can play at any level, making it possible to play for the U21s, senior side and again for the U21s.

== Competitive Record ==
For the all-time record of the national team against opposing nations, see the team's all-time record page

=== UEFA European Under-21 Championship Record ===
| UEFA European Under-21 Championship finals record | | | | | | | | | | Qualification record | | | | | | Manager(s) |
| Year | Round | Pos | Pld | W | D | L | GF | GA | Squad | Pld | W | D | L | GF | GA | Manager(s) |
|---|---|---|---|---|---|---|---|---|---|---|---|---|---|---|---|---|
| 1978 | did not enter | | | | | | | | | did not enter | | | | | | None |
| 1980 | did not enter | | | | | | | | | did not enter | | | | | | None |
| 1982 | did not enter | | | | | | | | | did not enter | | | | | | None |
| 1984 | did not enter | | | | | | | | | did not enter | | | | | | None |
| 1986 | did not enter | | | | | | | | | did not enter | | | | | | None |
| 1988 | did not enter | | | | | | | | | did not enter | | | | | | None |
| 1990 | did not enter | | | | | | | | | did not enter | | | | | | None |
| 1992 | did not enter | | | | | | | | | did not enter | | | | | | None |
| (France) 1994 | did not enter | | | | | | | | | did not enter | | | | | | None |
| (Spain) 1996 | did not enter | | | | | | | | | did not enter | | | | | | None |
| (Romania) 1998 | did not enter | | | | | | | | | did not enter | | | | | | None |
| (Slovakia) 2000 | did not qualify | | | | | | | | | 8 | 1 | 3 | 4 | 5 | 9 | Chris Nicholl |
| (Switzerland) 2002 | did not qualify | | | | | | | | | 10 | 2 | 2 | 6 | 12 | 21 | Roy Millar |
| (Germany) 2004 | did not qualify | | | | | | | | | 8 | 2 | 1 | 5 | 8 | 16 | Roy Millar |
| (Portugal) 2006 | did not enter | | | | | | | | | did not enter | | | | | | None |
| (Netherlands) 2007 | did not qualify | | | | | | | | | 4 | 2 | 0 | 2 | 10 | 7 | Roy Millar |
| (Sweden) 2009 | did not qualify | | | | | | | | | 8 | 4 | 0 | 4 | 13 | 12 | Roy Millar, Steve Beaglehole |
| (Denmark) 2011 | did not qualify | | | | | | | | | 8 | 2 | 1 | 5 | 12 | 16 | Steve Beaglehole |
| (Israel) 2013 | did not qualify | | | | | | | | | 8 | 1 | 1 | 6 | 5 | 13 | Steve Beaglehole, Stephen Robinson |
| (Czech Republic) 2015 | did not qualify | | | | | | | | | 8 | 1 | 0 | 7 | 3 | 17 | Stephen Robinson, Jim Magilton |
| (Poland) 2017 | did not qualify | | | | | | | | | 10 | 0 | 2 | 8 | 6 | 18 | Jim Magilton |
| (Italy) (San Marino) 2019 | did not qualify | | | | | | | | | 10 | 6 | 2 | 2 | 15 | 11 | Ian Baraclough |
| (Hungary) (Slovenia) 2021 | did not qualify | | | | | | | | | 10 | 2 | 3 | 5 | 7 | 13 | Ian Baraclough, Andy Crosby |
| (Georgia (country)) (Romania) 2023 | did not qualify | | | | | | | | | 8 | 2 | 1 | 5 | 8 | 18 | John Schofield |
| (Slovakia) 2025 | did not qualify | | | | | | | | | 10 | 3 | 2 | 5 | 10 | 10 | Tommy Wright |
| (Albania) (Serbia) 2027 | did not qualify | | | | | | | | | 7 | 3 | 1 | 3 | 8 | 11 | Tommy Wright |
| Total | - | 0/25 | 0 | 0 | 0 | 0 | 0 | 0 | - | 117 | 31 | 19 | 67 | 122 | 192 | - |

== Results and fixtures ==
=== 2025 ===
| 13 November 2027 UEFA U-21 Group F Qualifier | Northern Ireland | 1–0 | Latvia | Belfast, Northern Ireland |
| 19:45 GMT | Glenfield 60' | Report | | Stadium: The Oval; Attendance: 487; Referee: Ivar Orri Kristjansson (Iceland) |

| 18 November 2027 UEFA U-21 Group F Qualifier | Greece | 4–0 | Northern Ireland | Livadeia, Greece |
| 14:00 GMT | Alexiou 19'; Goumas 26'; Tzimas 63' (pen.); Smyrlis 81' | Report | | Stadium: Levadia Municipal Stadium; Attendance: 2,433; Referee: Alejandro Muñiz Ruiz (Spain) |

=== 2026 ===
| 27 March 2027 UEFA U-21 Group F Qualifier | Germany | 3–0 | Northern Ireland | Braunschweig, Germany |
| 17:00 GMT | Tresoldi 11' (pen.), 41'; Weiper 90' | Report | | Stadium: Eintracht-Stadion; Attendance: 10,391; Referee: Jakob Sundberg (Denmark) |

| 31 March 2027 UEFA U-21 Group F Qualifier | Latvia | 1–3 | Northern Ireland | Riga, Latvia |
| 12:00 BST | Mežsargs 14' | Report | Kirk 29'; Kenny 68'; Moses 90+5' | Stadium: Daugava National Stadium; Attendance: 145; Referee: Sandi Putros (Denmark) |

| 3 June Friendly | Portugal | 4–0 | Northern Ireland | Estoril, Portugal |
| 18:30 BST | Sa 14'; Quenda 35', 72'; Lynch 90' (o.g.) | Report | | Stadium: Estádio António Coimbra da Mota; Referee: Mathieu Vernice (France) |

| 26 September 2027 UEFA U-21 Group F Qualifier | Malta | 0–4 | Northern Ireland | Ta' Qali, Malta |
| 18:00 BST | | Report | Kearney 31'; Patterson 43', 63'; McCann 73' | Stadium: Centenary Stadium; Attendance: 203; Referee: Ioannis Christodoulou (Cyprus) |

| 1 October 2027 UEFA U-21 Group F Qualifier | Northern Ireland | 1–1 | Georgia | Ballymena, Northern Ireland |
| 19:45 BST | Brannigan 72' | Report | Doltmourziev 54' | Stadium: Ballymena Showgrounds; Attendance: 414; Referee: Dovydas Švėgžda (Lithuania) |

| 6 October 2027 UEFA U-21 Group F Qualifier | Northern Ireland | 0–1 | Greece | Lurgan, Northern Ireland |
| 17:00 BST | | Report | Mythou 32' | Stadium: Mourneview Park; Attendance: Mohammad Usman Aslam (Norway) |

== UEFA European Under-21 Championship ==
=== 2027 UEFA European Under-21 Championship qualification ===
| Pos | Team | Pld | W | D | L | GF | GA | GD | Pts | Qualification | Germany | Greece | | Georgia | Latvia | Malta |
|---|---|---|---|---|---|---|---|---|---|---|---|---|---|---|---|---|
| 1 | Germany | 10 | 9 | 0 | 1 | 32 | 5 | +27 | 27 (Note: Tied on head-to-head points (3). Head-to-head goal difference: Germany +1, Greece −1.) | Final tournament | — | 2–3 | 3–0 | 2–0 | 5–0 | 6–0 |
| 2 | Greece | 10 | 9 | 0 | 1 | 29 | 6 | +23 | 27 | Play-offs | 0–2 | — | 4–0 | 3–0 | 4–2 | 5–0 |
| 3 | Northern Ireland | 10 | 4 | 2 | 4 | 13 | 13 | 0 | 14 | | 1–2 | 0–1 | — | 1–1 | 1–0 | 2–0 |
| 4 | Georgia | 10 | 2 | 4 | 4 | 13 | 15 | −2 | 10 | | 0–2 | 0–3 | 1–1 | — | 1–1 | 4–1 |
| 5 | Latvia | 10 | 2 | 2 | 6 | 8 | 20 | −12 | 8 | | 0–4 | 0–1 | 1–3 | 1–1 | — | 2–0 |
| 6 | Malta | 10 | 0 | 0 | 10 | 2 | 38 | −36 | 0 | | 1–4 | 0–5 | 0–4 | 0–5 | 0–1 | — |

Source: UEFA
Legend: Blue = home team win; Yellow = draw; Red = away team win.
Rules for classification: Tiebreakers

== Coaching staff ==
=== Current coaching staff ===
As of 27 August 2025

| Position | Name |
|---|---|
| Manager | (Northern Ireland) Tommy Wright |
| Assistant Manager | (Scotland) Steven MacLean |
| Coach | (Northern Ireland) Corry Evans |
| Goalkeeping Coach | (Northern Ireland) Conor Brennan |
| Analyst | (England) Josh Wall |

=== Manager history ===
Current manager highlighted in green

Last updated after the match against Greece on 6 October 2026.

| Manager | First Game | Last Game | Pld | W | D | L | GF | GA | GD | Win % | Draw % | Loss % |
|---|---|---|---|---|---|---|---|---|---|---|---|---|
| (Northern Ireland) Danny Blanchflower | 8 March 1978 vs. (Republic of Ireland) | 8 March 1978 vs. (Republic of Ireland) | 1 | 0 | 1 | 0 | 1 | 1 | 0 | 0.00% | 100.00% | 0.00% |
| (Northern Ireland) Billy Bingham | 3 April 1990 vs. (Israel) | 3 April 1990 vs. (Israel) | 1 | 1 | 0 | 0 | 2 | 1 | +1 | 100.00% | 0.00% | 0.00% |
| (Northern Ireland) Bryan Hamilton | 22 March 1994 vs. (Romania) | 22 March 1994 vs. (Romania) | 1 | 0 | 1 | 0 | 0 | 0 | 0 | 0.00% | 100.00% | 0.00% |
| (Northern Ireland) Roy Millar | 21 April 1998 vs. (Switzerland) | 21 April 1998 vs. (Switzerland) | 1 | 1 | 0 | 0 | 2 | 1 | +1 | 100.00% | 0.00% | 0.00% |
| (Northern Ireland) Chris Nicholl | 20 May 1998 vs. (Scotland) | 8 October 1999 vs. (Finland) | 13 | 3 | 5 | 5 | 11 | 13 | –2 | 23.08% | 38.46% | 38.46% |
| (Northern Ireland) Roy Millar | 28 March 2000 vs. (Malta) | 26 March 2008 vs. (Romania) | 48 | 18 | 8 | 22 | 64 | 79 | –15 | 37.50% | 16.67% | 45.83% |
| (England) Steve Beaglehole | 19 August 2008 vs. (Poland) | 15 November 2011 vs. (Serbia) | 21 | 4 | 3 | 14 | 23 | 39 | –16 | 19.05% | 14.29% | 66.67% |
| (Northern Ireland) Steve Robinson | 10 May 2012 vs. (North Macedonia) | 15 October 2013 vs. (Serbia) | 10 | 0 | 0 | 10 | 5 | 24 | –19 | 0.00% | 0.00% | 100.00% |
| (Northern Ireland) Jim Magilton* | 14 November 2013 vs. (Italy) | 11 October 2016 vs. (France) | 14 | 1 | 2 | 11 | 8 | 27 | –19 | 7.14% | 14.29% | 78.57% |
| (England) Ian Baraclough | 8 June 2017 vs. (Estonia) | 19 November 2019 vs. (Romania) | 19 | 9 | 6 | 4 | 22 | 19 | +3 | 47.37% | 31.58% | 21.05% |
| (England) Andy Crosby** | 4 September 2020 vs. (Malta) | 5 June 2021 vs. (Scotland) | 7 | 3 | 0 | 4 | 9 | 11 | –2 | 42.86% | 0.00% | 57.14% |
| (England) John Schofield | 3 September 2021 vs. (Malta) | 25 September 2022 vs. (Scotland) | 11 | 2 | 2 | 7 | 10 | 27 | –17 | 18.18% | 18.18% | 63.64% |
| (Northern Ireland) Tommy Wright | 7 September 2023 vs. (Luxembourg) | | 25 | 8 | 5 | 12 | 25 | 32 | –7 | 32.00% | 20.00% | 48.00% |
| Total | | | 172 | 50 | 33 | 89 | 182 | 274 | -92 | 29.07% | 19.19% | 51.74% |

- * first two games as caretaker manager
- ** caretaker manager for all 7 games

== Players ==
=== Current squad ===
Players born on or after 1 January 2004 will be eligible until the completion of the 2027 UEFA European Under-21 Championship.

The following players were named in the squad for the 2027 UEFA European Under-21 Championship qualification Group F matches against Malta, Georgia and Greece on 26 September, 1 and 6 October 2026; respecitvely.

Caps and goals correct as of 6 October 2026, after the match against Greece

| No. | Pos. | Player | Date of birth (age) | Caps | Goals | Club |
|---|---|---|---|---|---|---|
| | GK | Stephen McMullan | 31 December 2004 (age 21) | 13 | 0 | (Football Association of Ireland) Waterford |
| | GK | Fraser Barnsley | 6 October 2004 (age 22) | 5 | 0 | (The Football Association) Everton |
| | GK | Josh Gracey | 14 December 2007 (age 18) | 1 | 0 | (The Football Association) Wolverhampton Wanderers |
| | DF | Shea Kearney | 26 March 2004 (age 22) | 12 | 1 | (Scottish Football Association) Dunfermline Athletic |
| | DF | Jonny Russell | 19 September 2004 (age 22) | 12 | 0 | (The Football Association) Crawley Town |
| | DF | Conor Barr | 19 December 2005 (age 20) | 11 | 0 | (Football Association of Ireland) Derry City |
| | DF | Sam Inwood | 17 September 2005 (age 21) | 7 | 0 | (The Football Association) Swindon Town |
| | DF | Bayley McCann | 8 December 2005 (age 20) | 6 | 1 | (The Football Association) Doncaster Rovers |
| | DF | Josh Briggs | 14 March 2006 (age 20) | 6 | 0 | (The Football Association) West Ham United |
| | DF | Matthew Orr | 16 April 2007 (age 19) | 5 | 1 | (The Football Association) Nottingham Forest |
| | DF | Conor Haughey | 29 May 2007 (age 19) | 2 | 0 | (The Football Association) Fleetwood Town |
| | MF | Darren Robinson | 29 December 2004 (age 21) | 20 | 0 | (The Football Association) Doncaster Rovers |
| | MF | Jack Patterson | 16 October 2005 (age 21) | 4 | 2 | (The Football Association) Everton |
| | MF | Ryan Donnelly | 4 September 2006 (age 20) | 9 | 0 | (The Football Association) Leicester City |
| | MF | Sam Glenfield | 10 May 2005 (age 21) | 6 | 1 | (Football Association of Ireland) Waterford |
| | MF | James Simpson | 5 April 2007 (age 19) | 4 | 0 | (Irish Football Association) Larne |
| | FW | Makenzie Kirk | 6 February 2004 (age 22) | 17 | 2 | (The Football Association) Barnsley |
| | FW | Eoin Kenny | 30 December 2005 (age 20) | 11 | 1 | (The Football Association) Portsmouth |
| | FW | Aodhan Doherty | 3 May 2006 (age 20) | 6 | 0 | (Scottish Football Association) Falkirk |
| | FW | Cole Brannigan | 12 May 2007 (age 19) | 6 | 1 | (The Football Association) Aston Villa |
| | FW | Devlan Moses | 17 October 2005 (age 21) | 4 | 1 | (The Football Association) Buxton |
| | FW | Callum Burnside | 16 January 2007 (age 19) | 3 | 0 | (Scottish Football Association) Airdrieonians |
| | FW | Braiden Graham | 7 November 2007 (age 18) | 1 | 0 | (The Football Association) Everton |
| | FW | Paul McGovern | 9 January 2008 (age 18) | 1 | 0 | (Scottish Football Association) Falkirk |
| | FW | Kalum Thompson | 27 September 2008 (age 18) | 1 | 0 | (The Football Association) Nottingham Forest |

=== Recent call-ups ===
The following players have previously been called up to the Northern Ireland under-21 squad within the last twelve months and remain eligible.

| Pos. | Player | Date of birth (age) | Caps | Goals | Club | Latest call-up |
|---|---|---|---|---|---|---|
| GK | Mason Munn | 30 March 2006 (age 20) | 2 | 0 | (Scotland) Rangers | v. Portugal, 3 June 2026 |
| DF | Harry Lynch | 16 May 2006 (age 20) | 1 | 0 | (Northern Ireland) Bangor | v. Portugal, 3 June 2026 |
| DF | Tom Atcheson | 22 September 2006 (age 20) | 4 | 0 | (England) Blackburn Rovers | v. Germany, 27 March 2026 ^{SEN} |
| DF | Broghan Sewell | 13 October 2008 (age 18) | 1 | 0 | (England) Southampton | v. Germany, 14 October 2025 |
| DF | George Goodman | 1 December 2006 (age 19) | 0 | 0 | (England) Bradford City | v. Germany, 14 October 2025 |
| MF | Francis Turley | 14 January 2006 (age 20) | 2 | 1 | (Scotland) Celtic | v. Malta, 26 September 2026 ^{WTD} |
| MF | Joe Sheridan | 29 October 2007 (age 19) | 1 | 0 | (Northern Ireland) Cliftonville | v. Germany, 14 October 2025 |
| FW | George Feeney | 19 January 2008 (age 18) | 1 | 0 | (England) Tottenham Hotspur | v. Portugal, 3 June 2026 |
| FW | Kieran Morrison | 9 November 2006 (age 19) | 3 | 0 | (England) Liverpool | v. Greece, 18 November 2025 |
| FW | Ceadach O'Neill | 10 April 2008 (age 18) | 3 | 0 | (England) Arsenal | v. Germany, 14 October 2025 |
^{INJ} = Player withdrew from the squad before any games had been played.^{PRE} = Preliminary squad / standby.^{SEN} = Player withdrew from the squad due to a call up to the senior team.^{SUS} = Suspended from national team.^{WTD} = Withdrew due to other reasons.

== Player records ==
=== Most appearances ===
Players still active are highlighted in green

Last updated after the match against Greece on 6 October 2026.

| Rank | Player | Year(s) | U-21 Caps | U-21 Goals | First Cap | Last Cap |
|---|---|---|---|---|---|---|
| 1 | Liam Donnelly | 2012–2018 | 24 | 5 | 13 November 2012 vs. (England) | 16 October 2018 vs. (Slovakia) |
| 2 | Sean Friars | 1998–2001 | 21 | 2 | 21 April 1998 vs. (Switzerland) | 5 June 2001 vs. (Czech Republic) |
| 2 | Caolan Boyd-Munce | 2017–2022 | 21 | 0 | 25 March 2019 vs. (Mexico) | 25 September 2022 vs. (Scotland) |
| 4 | Kofi Balmer | 2019–2022 | 20 | 0 | 22 March 2019 vs. (Bulgaria) | 4 June 2022 vs. (Spain) |
| 4 | Ethan Galbraith | 2019–2022 | 20 | 1 | 22 March 2019 vs. (Bulgaria) | 7 June 2022 vs. (Lithuania) |
| 4 | Aaron Donnelly | 2021–2024 | 20 | 0 | 2 June 2021 vs. (Scotland) | 15 October 2024 vs. (Luxembourg) |
| 4 | Darren Robinson | 2023–2026 | 20 | 0 | 7 September 2023 vs. (Luxembourg) | 6 October 2026 vs. (Greece) |
| 8 | Terry McFlynn | 2000–2003 | 19 | 2 | 28 March 2000 vs. (Malta) | 10 October 2003 vs. (Greece) |
| 8 | Rory McArdle | 2006–2008 | 19 | 1 | 6 February 2006 vs. (Israel) | 26 March 2008 vs. (Romania) |
| 8 | Thomas Stewart | 2006–2008 | 19 | 4 | 6 February 2006 vs. (Israel) | 26 March 2008 vs. (Romania) |
| 11 | Chris Casement | 2007–2009 | 18 | 2 | 6 February 2007 vs. (Wales) | 17 November 2009 vs. (Czech Republic) |
| 11 | Cameron Dummigan | 2014–2018 | 18 | 0 | 9 September 2014 vs. (Serbia) | 16 October 2018 vs. (Slovakia) |
| 11 | Alfie McCalmont | 2019–2022 | 18 | 3 | 25 March 2019 vs. (Mexico) | 25 September 2022 vs. (Scotland) |

=== Leading Goalscorers ===
Players still active are highlighted in green

Last updated after the match against Greece on 6 October 2026.

| Rank | Player | Year(s) | U-21 Goals | U-21 Caps | Goals per game | First Goal | Last Goal |
|---|---|---|---|---|---|---|---|
| 1 | Liam Donnelly | 2012–2018 | 5 | 24 | 0.21 | 8 June 2017 vs. (Estonia) | 11 September 2018 vs. (Spain) |
| 1 | Shayne Lavery | 2016–2020 | 5 | 14 | 0.36 | 10 November 2017 vs. (Albania) | 25 March 2019 vs. (Mexico) |
| 3 | Adrian Coote | 1998–1999 | 4 | 12 | 0.33 | 21 April 1998 vs. (Switzerland) | 17 August 1999 vs. (France) |
| 3 | David Healy | 1998–1999 | 4 | 8 | 0.5 | 17 November 1998 vs. (Moldova) | 17 August 1999 vs. (France) |
| 3 | Sam Morrow | 2005–2006 | 4 | 4 | 1 | 8 February 2005 vs. (Scotland) | 12 April 2006 vs. (Liechtenstein) |
| 3 | Thomas Stewart | 2006–2008 | 4 | 19 | 0.21 | 16 May 2006 vs. (Scotland) | 26 March 2008 vs. (Romania) |
| 3 | Josh Magennis | 2009–2012 | 4 | 17 | 0.24 | 8 September 2009 vs. (Iceland) | 7 September 2012 vs. (North Macedonia) |
| 3 | Oliver Norwood | 2009–2012 | 4 | 11 | 0.36 | 13 November 2009 vs. (Germany) | 2 March 2010 vs. (San Marino) |
| 3 | Paul O'Neill | 2019–2021 | 4 | 10 | 0.4 | 9 October 2020 vs. (Finland) | 12 November 2021 vs. (Lithuania) |
| 10 | Gary Hamilton | 2000–2001 | 3 | 12 | 0.25 | 2 June 2000 vs. (Wales) | 10 October 2000 vs. (Iceland) |
| 10 | Mo Harkin | 2000–2001 | 3 | 9 | 0.33 | 28 March 2000 vs. (Malta) | 10 October 2000 vs. (Iceland) |
| 10 | Grant McCann | 2000–2001 | 3 | 11 | 0.27 | 10 October 2000 vs. (Iceland) | 5 October 2001 vs. (Malta) |
| 10 | Lee McEvilly | 2002–2003 | 3 | 9 | 0.33 | 6 September 2002 vs. (Scotland) | 1 April 2003 vs. (Greece) |
| 10 | Chris Turner | 2006–2008 | 3 | 12 | 0.25 | 1 June 2007 vs. (Moldova) | 16 November 2007 vs. (Luxembourg) |
| 10 | Andrew Little | 2008–2010 | 3 | 6 | 0.5 | 18 November 2008 vs. (Scotland) | 3 September 2010 vs. (San Marino) |
| 10 | Billy Kee | 2009–2011 | 3 | 10 | 0.3 | 10 August 2011 vs. (Faroe Islands) | 10 August 2011 vs. (Faroe Islands) |
| 10 | David Parkhouse | 2017–2020 | 3 | 17 | 0.18 | 8 June 2017 vs. (Estonia) | 4 September 2020 vs. (Malta) |
| 10 | Alfie McCalmont | 2019–2022 | 3 | 18 | 0.17 | 14 November 2019 vs. (Hungary) | 12 November 2021 vs. (Lithuania) |
| 10 | Dale Taylor | 2021–2024 | 3 | 15 | 0.2 | 2 June 2021 vs. (Scotland) | 25 September 2022 vs. (Scotland) |
| 10 | Charlie Allen | 2022–2024 | 3 | 14 | 0.21 | 26 March 2024 vs. (Serbia) | 12 October 2024 vs. (Azerbaijan) |

== See also ==
- Northern Ireland national football team
- Northern Ireland national under-17 football team
- Northern Ireland national under-19 football team
