= 2011–12 in Danish football =

Football in Denmark
- Season: 2011–12

The 2011–12 in Danish football season was the 122nd edition of competitive football in Denmark.

== Club football ==
=== Domestic football ===
==== Superliga ====
The 22nd edition of the Danish Superliga was set to start on 16 July 2011 and end on 25 May 2012.

===== League table =====
Pos	Team	Pld	W	D	L	GF	GA	GD	Pts	Qualification or relegation
1	Nordsjælland (C)	33	21	5	7	49	22	+27	68	Qualification to Champions League group stage
2	Copenhagen	33	19	9	5	55	26	+29	66	Qualification to Champions League third qualifying round
3	Midtjylland	33	17	7	9	50	40	+10	58	Qualification to Europa League play-off round (Note: Because 2011–12 Danish Cup winners Copenhagen qualified for the Champions League, and runners-up Horsens qualified for the Europa League through league position, the distribution of the Europa League spots reverted to league positions.)
4	Horsens	33	17	6	10	53	39	+14	57	Qualification to Europa League third qualifying round
5	AGF	33	12	12	9	47	40	+7	48	Qualification to Europa League second qualifying round
6	SønderjyskE	33	11	11	11	48	51	−3	44	
7	AaB	33	12	8	13	42	48	−6	44	
8	Silkeborg IF	33	11	10	12	51	47	+4	43	
9	Brøndby	33	9	9	15	35	46	−11	36	
10	OB	33	8	10	15	46	50	−4	34	
11	Lyngby Boldklub (Note: Lyngby Boldklub were originally deducted 3 points on 22 September 2011 for failing to have had the contract of former player Lasse Rise approved by the Danish FA, however they appealed the verdict and were returned the 3 points on 19 October 2011) (R)	33	8	4	21	32	60	−28	28	Relegation to Danish 1st Division
12	HB Køge (R)	33	4	7	22	32	71	−39	19	Relegation to Danish 1st Division

Source: Danish Football Association
Rules for classification: 1) points; 2) goal difference; 3) number of goals scored.
(C) Champions; (R) Relegated

==== First Division ====
The First Division was set to start on 12 August 2011 and end on 10 June 2012.

===== League table =====
Pos	Team	Pld	W	D	L	GF	GA	GD	Pts	Promotion or relegation
1	Esbjerg fB (C)	26	21	3	2	60	19	+41	66	Promotion to Danish Superliga
2	Randers FC (P)	26	15	4	7	38	22	+16	49	Promotion to Danish Superliga
3	Vejle Kolding	26	12	8	6	58	32	+26	44	
4	Viborg FF	26	10	10	6	45	34	+11	40	
5	Brønshøj	26	10	10	6	35	34	+1	40	
6	Vestsjælland	26	10	8	8	42	35	+7	38	
7	Fredericia	26	9	8	9	33	30	+3	35	
8	Skive IK	26	9	7	10	31	41	−10	34	
9	Hobro	26	8	9	9	37	35	+2	33	
10	Hjørring	26	8	7	11	31	42	−11	31	
11	AB	26	7	8	11	32	44	−12	29	
12	FC Roskilde (R)	26	8	3	15	28	38	−10	27	Relegation to Danish 2nd Divisions
13	Næstved BK (R)	26	6	4	16	32	51	−19	22	Relegation to Danish 2nd Divisions
14	Blokhus (R)	26	2	5	19	27	72	−45	11	Relegation to Danish 2nd Divisions

Source: Danish Football Association
Rules for classification: 1) points; 2) goal difference; 3) number of goals scored.
(C) Champions; (P) Promoted; (R) Relegated

==== Second Division ====
The Second Divisions was set to begin on 7 August 2011 and end on 16 June 2012.

===== League tables =====
Pos	Team	Pld	W	D	L	GF	GA	GD	Pts	Promotion or relegation
1	HIK	30	23	2	5	69	44	+25	71	Qualification to Promotion game
2	Hvidovre IF	30	21	3	6	79	36	+43	66	
3	Herlev	30	15	3	12	56	42	+14	48	
4	Rishøj BK	30	13	8	9	49	40	+9	47	
5	Fremad Amager	30	12	8	10	50	47	+3	44	
6	Svebølle B&I	30	12	7	11	54	55	−1	43	
7	B 1908	30	11	10	9	37	39	−2	43	
8	Nordvest FC	30	10	11	9	46	41	+5	41	
9	Elite 3000	30	12	5	13	51	54	−3	41	
10	Avarta	30	11	6	13	41	38	+3	39	
11	IF Skjold Birkerød	30	11	6	13	41	46	−5	39	
12	Søllerød-Vedbæk	30	11	6	13	38	43	−5	39	
13	Vanløse IF (R)	30	9	8	13	41	48	−7	35	Relegation to Denmark Series
14	B.93 (R)	30	8	9	13	37	44	−7	33	Relegation to Denmark Series
15	SC Egedal (R)	30	8	8	14	47	50	−3	32	Relegation to Denmark Series
16	BGA (R)	30	1	2	27	21	93	−72	5	Relegation to Denmark Series

Updated to match(es) played on 16 June 2012. Source: Danish FA
Rules for classification: 1) points; 2) goal difference; 3) number of goals scored.
(R) Relegated

Pos	Team	Pld	W	D	L	GF	GA	GD	Pts	Promotion or relegation
1	Fyn (P)	30	23	3	4	71	21	+50	72	Qualification to Promotion game
2	Næsby BK	30	22	4	4	77	29	+48	70	
3	Varde IF	30	14	13	3	42	27	+15	55	
4	Thisted FC	30	15	8	7	64	39	+25	53	
5	Aarhus Fremad	30	12	10	8	59	43	+16	46	
6	Marienlyst	30	12	9	9	56	55	+1	45	
7	FC Svendborg	30	10	13	7	50	39	+11	43	
8	Skovbakken IK	30	13	2	15	44	50	−6	41	
9	LFA	30	10	8	12	47	58	−11	38	
10	Kjellerup	30	9	9	12	39	43	−4	36	
11	Otterup B&I	30	8	9	13	42	64	−22	33	
12	Brabrand	30	8	8	14	36	40	−4	32	
13	Aarup BK (R)	30	7	8	15	38	66	−28	29	Relegation to Denmark Series
14	Lindholm IF (R)	30	7	7	16	32	62	−30	28	Relegation to Denmark Series
15	Skjold (R)	30	5	6	19	38	59	−21	21	Relegation to Denmark Series
16	Viby IF (R)	30	4	5	21	27	67	−40	17	Relegation to Denmark Series

Updated to match(es) played on 16 June 2012. Source: Danish FA
Rules for classification: 1) points; 2) goal difference; 3) number of goals scored.
(P) Promoted; (R) Relegated

==== Cup ====
The Cup was scheduled to play its first round matches on 9–11 August 2011 and hold its final on Ascension day, 17 May.

=== Continental football ===
For the first time since the 2000–01 season, two Danish teams would participate in the UEFA Champions League. F.C. Copenhagen qualified for the champions' path's third qualifying round as Danish champions, and OB qualified for the league path's third qualifying round as runners-up.

FC Nordsjælland qualified for the play-offs of the Europa League as cup winners, while Brøndby IF qualified as third in the league for the third qualifying round and FC Midtjylland qualified for the second qualifying round as fourth in the league.

==== Champions League ====
F.C. Copenhagen and OB entered in the third qualifying round and although they both qualified for the play-off round, they both lost in this round and thus dropped into the 2011–12 UEFA Europa League tournament.

27 July 2011 QR3	Copenhagen (Denmark)	1 – 0	(Republic of Ireland) Shamrock Rovers	Parken, Copenhagen
20:00	Ottesen 4'	Report		Attendance: 11,571; Referee: Pavle Radovanović, Montenegro

27 July 2011 QR3	OB (Denmark)	1 – 1	(Greece) Panathinaikos	TRE-FOR Park, Odense
20:00	Reginiussen 90'	Report	Leto 47'	Attendance: 10,055; Referee: Carlos Clos Gómez (Spain)

2 August 2011 QR3	Panathinaikos (Greece)	3 – 4 (4 – 5 agg.)	(Denmark) OB	Olympic Stadium, Athens
20:45	Boumsong 35'; Toché 50'; Petropoulos 90+5'	Report	Johansson 12'; Ruud 58'; Kadrii 80'; Andreasen 88'	Referee: Andre Marriner (England)

2 August 2011 QR3	Shamrock Rovers (Republic of Ireland)	0 – 2 (0 – 3 agg.)	(Denmark) Copenhagen	Tallaght Stadium, Dublin
20:45		Report	N'Doye 42'; Bolaños 73'	Referee: Halis Özkahya (Turkey)

16 August 2011 P-O	Copenhagen (Denmark)	1 – 3	(Czech Republic) FC Viktoria Plzeň	Parken, Copenhagen
20:45	Ottesen 69'	Report	Ottesen 52' (o.g.); Pilař 59'; Fillo 79'	Referee: Martin Atkinson (England)

17 August 2011 P-O	OB (Denmark)	1 – 0	(Spain) Villarreal	TRE-FOR Park, Odense
20:45	Andreasen 84'	Report		Referee: Damir Skomina (Slovenia)

23 August 2011 P-O	Villarreal (Spain)	3 – 0 (3 – 1 agg.)	(Denmark) Odense	Estadio El Madrigal, Villarreal
20:45	Rossi 50', 66'; Marchena 82'	Report	(yellow card) 18' (yellow-red card) 71' Kadrii	Referee: Craig Thomson (Scotland)

24 August 2011 P-O	Viktoria Plzeň (Czech Republic)	2 – 1 (5 – 2 agg.)	(Denmark) Copenhagen	Synot Tip Aréna, Prague^{12}
20:45	Bakoš 67'; Ďuriš 90+3'	Report	Bolaños 32'	Attendance: 19,350; Referee: Carlos Velasco Carballo (Spain)

==== Europa League ====
FC Nordsjælland entered in the play-offs, Brøndby IF entered in the third qualifying round where they were eliminated by Austrian SV Ried, FC Midtjylland entered in the second qualifying round and made it to the third qualifying round, losing out to Vitória SC.

14 July 2011 QR2	The New Saints (Wales)	1 – 3	(Denmark) FC Midtjylland	Park Hall, Oswestry
20:00	Evans 59'	Report	Hassan 65'; Olsen 86' (pen.); Albæk 90+3'	Attendance: 914; Referee: Mihaly Fabian (Hungary)

21 July 2011 QR2	FC Midtjylland (Denmark)	5 – 2 (8 – 3 agg.)	(Wales) The New Saints	MCH Arena, Herning
19:15	Igboun 23'; Nworuh 24', 52'; Olsen 32' (pen.); Hvilsom 90+1'	Report	Darlington 55', 90'	Referee: Levan Kvaratskhelia (Georgia)

28 July 2011 QR3	FC Midtjylland (Denmark)	0 – 0	(Portugal) Vitória SC	MCH Arena, Herning
21:00		Report

28 July 2011 QR3	SV Ried (Austria)	2 – 0	(Denmark) Brøndby IF	Keine Sorgen Arena, Ried im Innkreis
21:05	Mader 33'; Royer 46'	Report

4 August 2011 QR3	Brøndby IF (Denmark)	4 – 2 (4 – 4 agg.)	(Austria) SV Ried	Brøndby Stadion, Brøndby
19:00	Kristiansen 40'; Krohn-Dehli 45' (pen.); Akharraz 53', 55'	Report	Royer 71'; Anel Hadzic 88'	Referee: Thorsten Kinhöfer (Germany)

4 August 2011 QR3	Vitória SC (Portugal)	2 – 1 (2 – 1 agg.)	(Denmark) FC Midtjylland	Estádio D. Afonso Henriques, Guimarães
21:15	Faouzi 45'; Targino 76'	Report	Bak Nielsen 28'	Referee: Richard Liesveld (Netherlands)

18 August 2011 P-O	FC Nordsjælland (Denmark)	0 – 0	(Portugal) Sporting CP	Farum Park, Farum
20:00		Report		Referee: Mark Courtney (Northern Ireland)

25 August 2011 P-O	Sporting CP (Portugal)	2 – 1 (2 – 1 agg.)	(Denmark) Nordsjælland	Estádio José Alvalade, Lisbon
22:15	André Santos 77'; Evaldo 82'	Report	Laudrup 90+3'	Attendance: 24,028; Referee: Ovidiu Alin Hategan (Romania)

15 September 2011 GS	Copenhagen (Denmark)	1 – 0	(Ukraine) Vorskla Poltava	Parken Stadium, Copenhagen
19:00	Nordstrand 54' (pen.)	Report		Attendance: 10,420; Referee: Stanislav Todorov (Bulgaria)

15 September 2011 GS	Wisła Kraków (Poland)	1 – 3	(Denmark) Odense	Stadion im. Henryka Reymana, Kraków
21:05	Kirm 54'	Report	Johansson 35'; Utaka 80'; Falk 90+2'	Attendance: 12,920; Referee: Sascha Kever (Switzerland)

29 September 2011 GS	Odense (Denmark)	0 – 2	(England) Fulham	TRE-FOR Park, Odense
19:00		Report	Johnson 36', 88'	Attendance: 7,969; Referee: Maksim Layushkin (Russia)

29 September 2011 GS	Standard Liège (Belgium)	3 – 0	(Denmark) Copenhagen	Stade Maurice Dufrasne, Liège
21:05	Seijas 57'; Felipe 72'; Kanu 79'	Report		Attendance: 13,368; Referee: Anastassios Kakos (Greece)

20 October 2011 GS	Odense (Denmark)	1 – 4	(Netherlands) Twente	TRE-FOR Park, Odense
19:00	Fall 71'	Report	Brama 13'; Bajrami 31'; Chadli 65'; De Jong 82'	Attendance: 8,036; Referee: David Fernández Borbalán (Spain)

20 October 2011 GS	Hannover 96 (Germany)	2 – 2	(Denmark) Copenhagen	AWD-Arena, Hanover
21:05	Pander 29'; Pinto 82'	Report	N'Doye 68'; Santin 89'	Attendance: 43,100; Referee: Laurent Duhamel (France)

3 November 2011 GS	Copenhagen (Denmark)	1 – 2	(Germany) Hannover 96	Parken Stadium, Copenhagen
19:00	N'Doye 67'	Report	Schlaudraff 71'; Stindl 74'	Attendance: 27,853; Referee: Eric Braamhaar (Netherlands)

3 November 2011 GS	Twente (Netherlands)	3 – 2	(Denmark) Odense	De Grolsch Veste, Enschede
21:05	Høegh 35' (o.g.); Landzaat 37'; Fer 82'	Report	Fall 11', 62'	Attendance: 20,000; Referee: Ovidiu Alin Hategan (Romania)

30 November 2011 GS	Vorskla Poltava (Ukraine)	1 - 1	(Denmark) Copenhagen	Butovsky Vorskla Stadium, Poltava
21:05		Report

1 December 2011 GS	Odense (Denmark)	1 - 2	(Poland) Wisła Kraków	TRE-FOR Park, Odense
19:00		Report

14 December 2011 GS	Fulham (England)	2 - 2	(Denmark) Odense	Craven Cottage, London
21:05		Report

15 December 2011 GS	Copenhagen (Denmark)	0 - 1	(Belgium) Standard Liège	Parken Stadium, Copenhagen
19:00		Report

== National team football ==
=== Men's national football team ===
The men's national football team ended their qualifying campaign for Euro 2012 with three victories over Norway, Cyprus and Portugal, securing the overall group win and qualification for their first European Championship since 2004.

==== Euro 2012 ====
Pos	Team	Pld	W	D	L	GF	GA	GD	Pts	Qualification	(Denmark)	(Portugal)	(Norway)	(Iceland)	(Cyprus)
1	Denmark	8	6	1	1	15	6	+9	19	Qualify for final tournament	—	2–1	2–0	1–0	2–0
2	Portugal	8	5	1	2	21	12	+9	16 (Note: Tied on head-to-head results. Overall goal difference was used as the tiebreaker.)	Advance to play-offs	3–1	—	1–0	5–3	4–4
3	Norway	8	5	1	2	10	7	+3	16		1–1	1–0	—	1–0	3–1
4	Iceland	8	1	1	6	6	14	−8	4		0–2	1–3	1–2	—	1–0
5	Cyprus	8	0	2	6	7	20	−13	2		1–4	0–4	1–2	0–0	—

Source: UEFA
Rules for classification: Qualification tiebreakers
Notes:

6 September 2011	Denmark	2 – 0	Norway	Parken, Copenhagen
20:15 CEST (UTC+02)	Bendtner 24', 44'	Report		Referee: Stéphane Lannoy, France

7 October 2011	Cyprus	1 – 4	Denmark	GSP Stadium, Nicosia
21:30 EEST (UTC+03)	Avraam 45+1'	Report	Jacobsen 7'; Rommedahl 11', 22'; Michael Krohn-Dehli 20'	Referee: Marijo Strahonja, Croatia

11 October 2011	Denmark	2 – 1	Portugal	Parken, Copenhagen
20:15 CEST (UTC+02)	Krohn-Dehli 13'; Bendtner 63'	Report	C. Ronaldo 90+2'	Referee: Nicola Rizzoli Italy

==== Euro 2012 finals ====
Denmark were drawn into the so-called "group of death" for the tournament along with 2010 FIFA World Cup finalists Netherlands, third-place finishers Germany, as well as eighth-finalists Portugal.

Pos	Team	Pld	W	D	L	GF	GA	GD	Pts	Qualification
1	Germany	3	3	0	0	5	2	+3	9	Advance to knockout stage
2	Portugal	3	2	0	1	5	4	+1	6	Advance to knockout stage
3	Denmark	3	1	0	2	4	5	−1	3	
4	Netherlands	3	0	0	3	2	5	−3	0	

Source: UEFA
Rules for classification: Group stage tiebreakers

9 June 2012	Netherlands	0 – 1	Denmark	Metalist Stadium, Kharkiv
19:00 EEST (UTC+03)

13 June 2012	Denmark	2 – 3	Portugal	Arena Lviv, Lviv
19:00 EEST (UTC+03)

17 June 2012	Denmark	1 – 2	Germany	Arena Lviv, Lviv
21:45 EEST (UTC+03)

==== Friendlies ====
10 August 2011	Scotland	2 – 1	Denmark	Hampden Park, Glasgow
19:45 WEST (UTC+01)	Kvist 22' (o.g.); Snodgrass 44'	Report (in Danish)	Eriksen 31'	Attendance: 17,582; Referee: Marco Borg (Malta)

11 November 2011	Denmark	2 – 0	Sweden	Parken, Copenhagen
CEST (UTC+02)	Bendtner 35'; Michael Krohn-Dehli 80'	Report (in Danish)		Referee: Svein Oddvar Moen, Norway

15 November 2011	Denmark	2 – 1	Finland	Blue Water Arena, Esbjerg
CEST (UTC+02)	Eremenko 18'	Report (in Danish)	Agger 57'; Bendtner 59'	Referee: Kristinn Jakobsson Iceland

Another friendly match date was set for 29 February 2012.

=== Women's national football team ===
The women's national team will begin their qualification for UEFA Women's Euro 2013, where they will attempt to make their first appearance since 2005.

==== Euro 2013 qualifying ====
Team	Pld	W	D	L	GF	GA	GD	Pts
Denmark	8	7	0	1	28	3	+25	21
Austria	8	6	1	1	16	9	+7	19
Czech Republic	8	4	1	3	16	9	+7	13
Portugal	8	2	0	6	16	13	+3	6
Armenia	8	0	0	8	2	44	−42	0

Source: UEFA.com

21 September 2011	Armenia	0 – 5	Denmark	Mika Stadium, Yerevan
14:00		Report	Kr. Pedersen 4'; Troelsgaard 29'; Harder 49'; Jensen 72'; Nielsen 90+3'	Attendance: 302; Referee: Lilach Asulin (Israel)

22 October 2011	Denmark	3 – 0	Austria	Vejle Stadion, Vejle
19:30	Harder 32', 41', 90+2'	Report		Attendance: 1,695; Referee: Efthalia Mitsi (Greece)

26 October 2011	Portugal	0 – 3	Denmark	Municipal Stadium, Barcelos
16:00		Report	Christiansen 13'; Petersen 77'; Nielsen 87'	Attendance: 612; Referee: Esther Staubli (Switzerland)

23 November 2011	Denmark	11 – 0	Armenia	Vejle Stadion, Vejle
18:15	Troelsgaard 3', 24', 53'; Røddik Hansen 28', 86'; Harder 36', 44', 88'; Christiansen 42'; Pedersen 58'; Bukh 90+2'	Report		Referee: Anja Kunick (Germany)

4 April 2012	Czech Republic	0 - 2	Denmark	FK Viktoria Stadion, Prague
15:30	Martínková (yellow card) 52'	Report	Veje 35'; Harder 53'; Hansen (yellow card) 63'	Attendance: 886; Referee: (Ukraine) Kateryna Monzul; Assistant referees: (Ukraine) Natalia Rachynska (Ukraine) Yana Sashchyna; Fourth official: (Czech Republic) Gabriela Hanakova

20 June 2012	Denmark	1 - 0	Czech Republic	Vejle Stadion, Vejle

15 September 2012	Austria	3 - 1	Denmark	NV Arena, St. Pölten

19 September 2012	Denmark	2 - 0	Portugal	Vejle Stadion, Vejle

==== Algarve Cup ====
The team will take part in the 2012 Algarve Cup.

=== Men's national under-21 team ===
The men's under-21 side will begin their qualification towards the 2013 U-21 European Championship in Israel.

==== U-21 Euro 2013 qualifying ====
Pos	Team	Pld	W	D	L	GF	GA	GD	Pts	Qualification	(Serbia)	(Denmark)	(North Macedonia)	(Northern Ireland)	(Faroe Islands)
1	Serbia	8	5	3	0	17	4	+13	18	Play-offs	—	0–0	5–1	1–0	5–1
2	Denmark	8	4	4	0	19	8	+11	16	Play-offs	1–1	—	6–5	3–0	4–0
3	Macedonia	8	3	3	2	14	15	−1	12		1–1	1–1	—	1–0	1–0
4	Northern Ireland	8	1	1	6	5	13	−8	4		0–2	0–3	1–3	—	4–0
5	Faroe Islands	8	0	3	5	3	18	−15	3		0–2	1–1	1–1	0–0	—

=== Men's youth national teams ===
The men's under-19 team will begin qualification for the 2012 UEFA European Under-19 Football Championship in Estonia. In the qualifying, they were placed in Group 12 alongside Austria (who will host the group), Malta and Albania. Should they finish in the top 2, or as the best third placed team of the 12 groups, they will qualify for the elite round.

The under-17 team will attempt to qualify for the 2012 UEFA European Under-17 Football Championship in Slovenia. Denmark will host Group 5 of the initial qualifying round and face Italy, Austria and Cyprus. A top 2 finish or a record as one of the two best teams in third position will qualify the squad for the elite round of qualifying.
