= 2015 UEFA European Under-21 Championship qualification Group 6 =

Football tournament qualification stage

The teams competing in Group 6 of the 2015 UEFA European Under-21 Championships qualifying competition were Germany, Romania, Montenegro, Republic of Ireland and Faroe Islands.

The ten group winners and the four best second-placed teams advanced to the play-offs.

== Standings ==
Pos	Team	Pld	W	D	L	GF	GA	GD	Pts	Qualification	Germany	Romania	Montenegro	Ireland	Faroe Islands
1	Germany	8	6	2	0	25	5	+20	20	Play-offs	—	8–0	2–0	2–0	3–2
2	Romania	8	3	3	2	14	19	−5	12		2–2	—	4–3	0–0	3–1
3	Montenegro	8	3	2	3	12	11	+1	11		1–1	3–2	—	0–0	3–0
4	Republic of Ireland	8	2	2	4	10	12	−2	8		0–4	0–1	1–2	—	5–2
5	Faroe Islands	8	1	1	6	9	23	−14	4		0–3	2–2	1–0	1–4	—

Source: UEFA
Rules for classification: Tiebreakers

== Results and fixtures ==
All times are CEST (UTC+02:00) during summer and CET (UTC+01:00) during winter.

7 June 2013
18:45

Faroe Islands	2–2	Romania
Zachariasen 29'; Ingason 90+4'	Report	Iancu 47'; Buș 85'

Svangaskarð, Toftir
Referee: Eiko Saar (Estonia)

11 June 2013
20:30

Montenegro	3–0	Faroe Islands
Mugoša 4', 66'; Boljević 51'	Report

Podgorica City Stadium, Podgorica
Referee: Denis Scherbakov (Belarus)

14 August 2013
20:00

Faroe Islands	1–4	Republic of Ireland
Sørensen 13'	Report	Carruthers 23'; Doherty 68', 88'; O'Brien 90'

Svangaskarð, Toftir
Referee: Petr Ardeleánu (Czech Republic)

6 September 2013
20:45

Faroe Islands	0–3	Germany
	Report	Leitner 7'; J. Hofmann 52'; Bittencourt 80'

Tórsvøllur, Tórshavn
Referee: Tore Hansen (Norway)

9 September 2013
20:45

Republic of Ireland	0–4	Germany
	Report	Leitner 12'; Volland 22', 24'; P. Hofmann 84'

Showgrounds, Sligo
Referee: Domagoj Vučkov (Croatia)
10 September 2013
20:30

Montenegro	3–2	Romania
Vukčević 11'; Mugoša 25'; Zorić 83'	Report	Roman 59', 90' (pen.)

Podgorica City Stadium, Podgorica
Referee: Alexandre Boucaut (Belgium)

11 October 2013
18:30

Germany	2–0	Montenegro
P. Hofmann 25'; Volland 90+2'	Report

BRITA-Arena, Wiesbaden
Referee: Mikhail Vilkov (Russia)
11 October 2013
18:30

Romania	0–0	Republic of Ireland
	Report

Stadionul Ceahlăul, Piatra Neamț
Referee: Yuriy Mozharovskyi (Ukraine)

15 October 2013
16:00

Republic of Ireland	0–1	Romania
	Report	Martin 54'

Showgrounds, Sligo
Referee: Mete Kalkavan (Turkey)
15 October 2013
18:30

Germany	3–2	Faroe Islands
Knoche 40'; Volland 74'; Younes 82'	Report	Fredriksberg 11'; Askham 69'

Auestadion, Kassel
Referee: Dennis Antamo (Finland)

15 November 2013
16:45

Republic of Ireland	5–2	Faroe Islands
Carruthers 17'; O'Brien 20', 42'; Grealish 25'; Forde 39'	Report	Zachariasen 26', 37' (pen.)

Showgrounds, Sligo
Referee: Alexandr Aliyev (Kazakhstan)
15 November 2013
17:00

Montenegro	1–1	Germany
Mugoša 50' (pen.)	Report	P. Hofmann 87'

Podgorica City Stadium, Podgorica
Referee: Kevin Clancy (Scotland)

19 November 2013
17:00

Montenegro	0–0	Republic of Ireland
	Report

Podgorica City Stadium, Podgorica
Referee: Vladimir Vnuk (Slovakia)
19 November 2013
18:00

Romania	2–2	Germany
Bumba 24'; Benzar 75'	Report	P. Hofmann 29' (pen.); Rüdiger 52'

Stadionul Marin Anastasovici, Giurgiu
Referee: Harald Lechner (Austria)

5 March 2014
14:00

Romania	3–1	Faroe Islands
Kalsø 18' (o.g.); Martin 56'; Gavra 66'	Report	Zachariasen 58' (pen.)

Stadionul Mogoșoaia, Mogoșoaia
Referee: Christos Nicolaides (Cyprus)
5 March 2014
16:00

Republic of Ireland	1–2	Montenegro
Doherty 11'	Report	Đorđević 75'; Mugoša 77'

Tallaght Stadium, Dublin
Referee: Nikolaj Hänni (Switzerland)

4 September 2014
18:30

Romania	4–3	Montenegro
Boldor 10'; Puşcaş 67'; Bumba 79' (pen.); Tănase 82'	Report	Đorđević 15', 33', 35'

Stadionul Dinamo, Bucharest
Referee: Eitan Shemeulevitch (Israel)
5 September 2014
18:00

Germany	2–0	Republic of Ireland
P. Hofmann 47'; J. Hofmann 50'	Report

Erdgas Sportpark, Halle
Referee: Andreas Ekberg (Sweden)

9 September 2014
18:00

Germany	8–0	Romania
Mallı 1'; P. Hofmann 12'; Younes 16'; J. Hofmann 44', 89'; Schulz 63'; Da Costa 80'; Stark 86'	Report

MDCC-Arena, Magdeburg
Referee: Benoît Bastien (France)
9 September 2014
18:00

Faroe Islands	1–0	Montenegro
Jonsson 31'	Report

Svangaskarð, Toftir
Referee: Ville Nevalainen (Finland)

== Goalscorers ==
6 goals

- (Germany) Philipp Hofmann

5 goals

- (Montenegro) Stefan Mugoša

4 goals

- (Faroe Islands) Gunnar Zachariasen
- (Germany) Jonas Hofmann
- (Germany) Kevin Volland
- (Montenegro) Luka Đorđević

3 goals

- (Republic of Ireland) Matthew Doherty
- (Republic of Ireland) Aiden O'Brien

2 goals

- (Germany) Moritz Leitner
- (Germany) Amin Younes
- (Republic of Ireland) Samir Carruthers
- (Romania) Claudiu Bumba
- (Romania) Mădălin Martin
- (Romania) Mihai Roman

1 goal

- (Faroe Islands) Hørður Askham
- (Faroe Islands) Árni Frederiksberg
- (Faroe Islands) Poul Ingason
- (Faroe Islands) Ari Jonsson
- (Faroe Islands) Gilli Sørensen
- (Germany) Leonardo Bittencourt
- (Germany) Danny da Costa
- (Germany) Robin Knoche
- (Germany) Yunus Mallı
- (Germany) Antonio Rüdiger
- (Germany) Nico Schulz
- (Germany) Niklas Stark
- (Montenegro) Aleksandar Boljević
- (Montenegro) Marko Vukčević
- (Montenegro) Darko Zorić
- (Republic of Ireland) Anthony Forde
- (Republic of Ireland) Jack Grealish
- (Romania) Romario Benzar
- (Romania) Deian Boldor
- (Romania) Sergiu Buș
- (Romania) Cristian Gavra
- (Romania) Gabriel Iancu
- (Romania) George Pușcaș
- (Romania) Florin Tănase

1 own goal

- (Faroe Islands) Sørmund Kalsø (against Romania)
