= Auestadion =

Football stadium

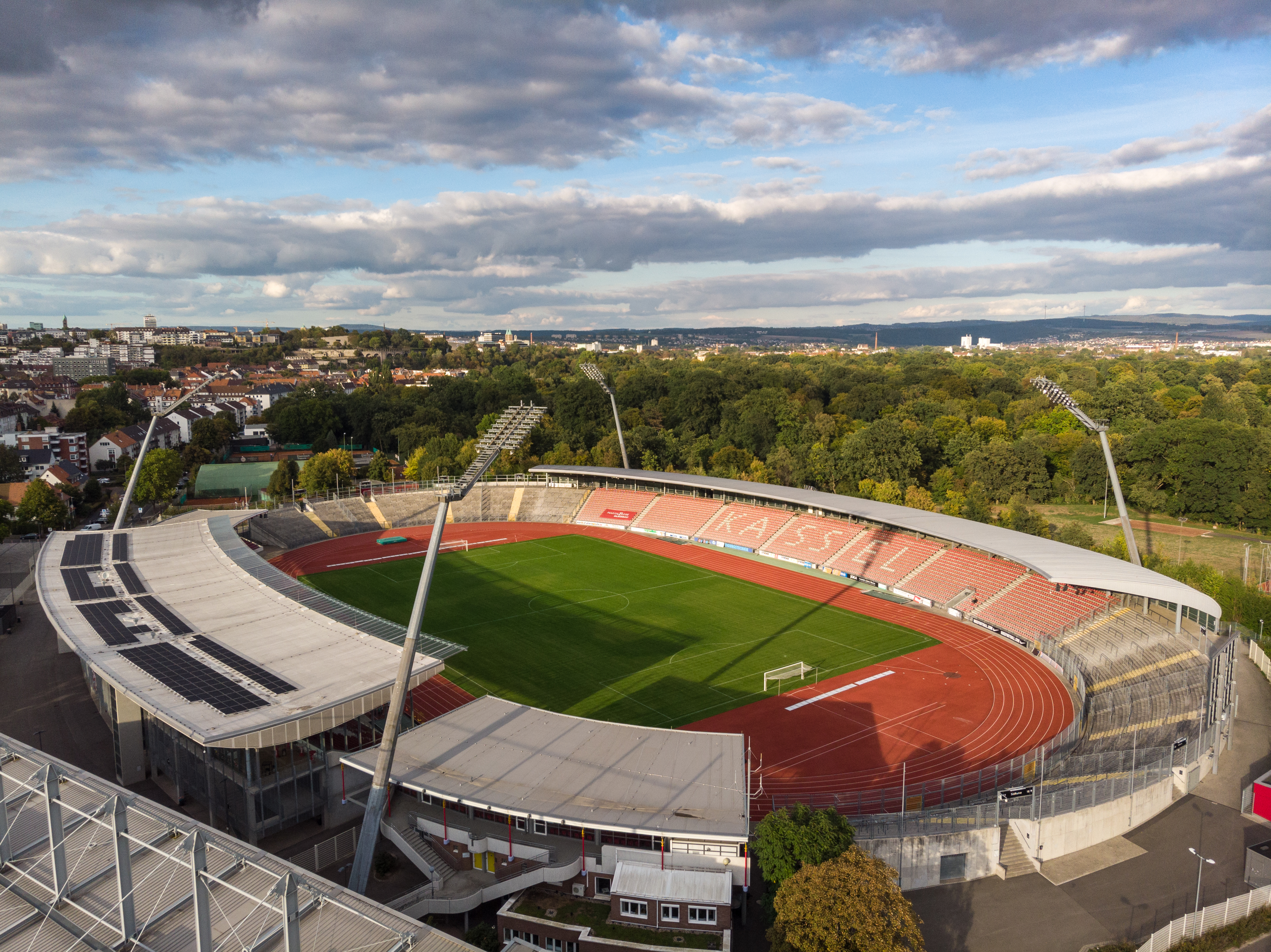
- Interactive map of Auestadion
- Address: Frankfurter Str. 143, 34121 Kassel, Germany
- Location: Kassel, Hesse, Germany
- Coordinates: 51°17′55″N 9°29′3″E
- Owner: City of Kassel
- Capacity: 18,737; 8,700 (seats)
- Surface: grass
- Scoreboard: yes (one)
- Record attendance: 37,000; 6 June 1964; Kassel vs Hannover; 1964 Bundesliga playoff
- Field size: 106 x 65 m
- Public transit: Auestadion (Trams 5 & 6); Auestadion (RegioTram RT5)

Construction
- Groundbreaking: 1950
- Built: 1953 (73 years ago)
- Opened: 23 August 1953
- Renovated: 1983–1993; 2003−2010
- Cost: DM 1.7m (1953); DM 4m (1983−1993) €23m (2003−2010)

Tenants
- KSV Hessen Kassel (1953−Present); KSV Baunatal (1976−1979)

Auestadion (German pronunciation: [ˈaʊəˌʃtaːdi̯ɔn], lit. 'Meadow Stadium') is a multi-use stadium in Kassel, Germany, close to the Karlsaue park. It is used mainly for football matches and athletic events and is the home stadium of KSV Hessen Kassel. The stadium is able to hold 18,737 people with 8,700 seats and standing terraces. It was opened on 23 August 1953, and renovated between 1983–1993 and between 2003 and 2010. It is the largest stadium in Northern Hesse.

== History ==
=== Construction ===
The City of Kassel first started considering a new stadium being built on the eventual Auestadion site in 1948. The site had previously been used as a parade ground. Construction started on a new stadium in 1950. The foundations for the new stadium grandstand was built from 100,000 m3 of World War II debris from the city centre of Kassel. The grandstand was built to hold 2,200 fans. It had a cantilevered steel roof, enabling uninterrupted views of the playing surface from the stand for the supporters. It was only the second stadium in Germany to incorporate a cantilevered roof, following the Heinz Hilten designed Rosenaustadion in Augsburg that was built two years prior in 1951. In additional to the roof and seating capacity, the grandstand incorporated glazed exterior walls, a dedicated section for the media and change rooms for players and officials. A six lane running track made out of red cinder was installed around the outside of the football pitch.

=== Opening ===
On 23 August 1953, the Auestadion was officially opened by Hessian Prime Minister Georg-August Zinn in front of 20,000 people. A top division football match between Auestadian's first tenants KSV Hessen Kassel and Bavarian opponents Viktoria Aschaffenburg was played to inaugurate the opening. Hessen Kassel lost the match 2–1. The athletics facilities at the stadium was completed in 1956. On 17 June 1956, to mark the completion, an inauguration ceremony was held along with an athletics festival attended by 12,000 spectators. Local and national athletes turned out for the festival, which was billed by local media at the time as good preparation for the Olynpic Games held in Melbourne, Australia later that year.

=== Renovations ===
1983 to 1993

The first renovation and rejuvenation of the Auestadion occurred between 1983 and 1993. During those ten years, two new seating stands were built either side of the main grandstand on the western side of the stadium. Designed by Norbert Harle, each of these new stands had a cantilevered roof like the grandstand and seating capacity for 700 people. In addition to the new stands, the running track was upgraded with a new artificial surface and other athletic facilities were installed to ensure the viability of the stadium for future athletic competitions.

2003 to 2009

Between 2003 and 2009 the City of Kassel planned two phases of upgrades to the stadium to improve both athletics and football experiences at the venue.

The first phase began construction in 2003 and was completed in 2006. The East stand (opposite side of the stadium from the main grandstand) was built. The decision was taken to build it out of steel to match the main grandstand's style. This included building a new steel roof, the first time the east stand had a roof. The seating capacity of the new east stand was 4,700. There was also new terracing sections installed around the corners either side of the stand. This accommodated an additional 1,000 people. A new tunnel on the eastern side of the stadium was built to connect the playing ground to the warm-up and training area. On 25 November 2006, the new east stand was inaugurated with a football match between KSV Hessen Kassel and FC Bayern Munich II. The match ended in a 1–1 draw.

The second phase began in mid-2007 and was completed in 2009. The running track was expanded from 6 to 8 lanes, the standing terraces of the north and south sides of the stadium were renovated and a new floodlight system was installed. The planned renovations to the main grandstand however was scrapped at the beginning of 2009 when it was discovered the concrete used in the 50 year old grandstand was dilapidated. Instead the City of Kassel put out to tender to demolish the current stand and build a new one.

2009 to 2011

The discovery of the poor quality concrete in the main grandstand kick-started a new project to demolish and rebuild a new grandstand at the stadium. The City of Kassel created a tender process to select the company to complete this project. The project had a budget of €9.4 million and would consist of demolition of the old grandstand, building a new grandstand with a capacity of 2,644 seats and various function rooms, renovation of the stadium forecourt and upgrade to the Kassel tram stop for the stadium. The City decided to postpone the German Athletics Championships from 2010 to 2011 and move the Askina Sports Festival to Bauntal for two years to provide time for the project to be completed. The demolition of the old grandstand occurred in June 2009. A legal dispute regarding the tender process then delayed construction of the new grandstand. The matter was finally settled in favour of the City of Kassel by the Frankfurt Higher Regional Court on 11 December 2009 and construction work finally began. The new grandstand and the project was completed on 14 October 2010 with the new total spectator capacity of the Auestadion brought up to 18,737. The opening of the new grandstand occurred on 24 October 2010. The City of Kassel hosted a festival ahead of the scheduled regionalliga KSV Hessen Kassel football match against Nürnberg II. There was music, stadium tours, hands-on activities by the Kassel athletics clubs and an appearance by the Police Motorsport Club.

Between 2003 and 2010 the City of Kassel had spent a total of €23 million on upgrades to the Auestadion.

In 2011, the City of Kassel, state of Hesse and KSV Hessen Kassel raised €400,000 between them to install a 72 square meter video wall at the stadium. The video wall was a condition stipulated in the awarding of the 2011 German Athletics Championship to Auestadion by the German Athletics Association. The video wall became operational on 13 July 2011.

== Events ==
The stadium has been the venue for the final of the DFB-Pokal twice. The first final held at Auestadion was the 1958 DFB-Pokal Final, the fifteenth edition of the cup competition. Fortuna Düsseldorf met VfB Stuttgart in the final in front of 28,000 spectators. Stuttgart won the final 4−3 with an extra time goal by VfB striker Lothar Weise in the 113th minute. It was Stuttgart's second Pokal success and the third time Düsseldorf had lost the Pokal final. The second final held at the Auestadion was the 1959 DFB-Pokal Final. In front of 20,000 fans, Schwarz-Weiß Essen faced Borussia Neunkirchen in the final. In a high scoring match, Essen defeated Neunkirchen 5−2 to claim their maiden Pokal title.

The Auestadion was one of two host venues for the inaugural 1965 Athletics European Cup. The European Cup idea had been born by Bruno Zauli, who at the time was president of the International Association of Athletics Federation, to bring together East and West Europe into one athletics event. The men's event was held on 11–12 September at the Neckarstadion in Stuttgart. The women's event was held one week later on 19 September at the Auestadion in Kassel. There were eleven disciplines contested at the women's event including running, hurdles, high and long jump, shot put, discus and javelin throwing. Eastern European athletes dominated the medal tally at the event. Gold medals were given out to athletes from Poland, East Germany, Soviet Union and Hungary. The Soviet Union topped the standings at the end of the event with 59 points. East Germany came second and Poland finished third.

Between 1998-2008 and 2011 the Auestadion hosted an annual international athletics festival named Askina Sports Festival (German: Askina-Sportfest). The annual event was organised by Heinz Hüsselmann and his Bochum based agency Performance Promotion GmbH. The festival was named after a product produced by major sponsor B. Braun. The event was supported by the European Athletics Association (EAA), German Athletics Association (DLV), Hessen Athletics Association (HLV) and the City of Kassel. The Askina Sports Festival attracted top level athletes from Germany, Europe and the rest of the world. It was used both as a warm-up and qualifying meeting for major international tournaments. The event was moved away from Auestadion in 2009 and 2010 due to the construction work on the new grandstand at the stadium. Baunatal Park Stadium in Baunatal hosted the festival for those two years. In 2011 the event returned to Auestadion one last time. In 2012 the event was cancelled due to sponsors pulling out and the City of Kassel withdrawing support.

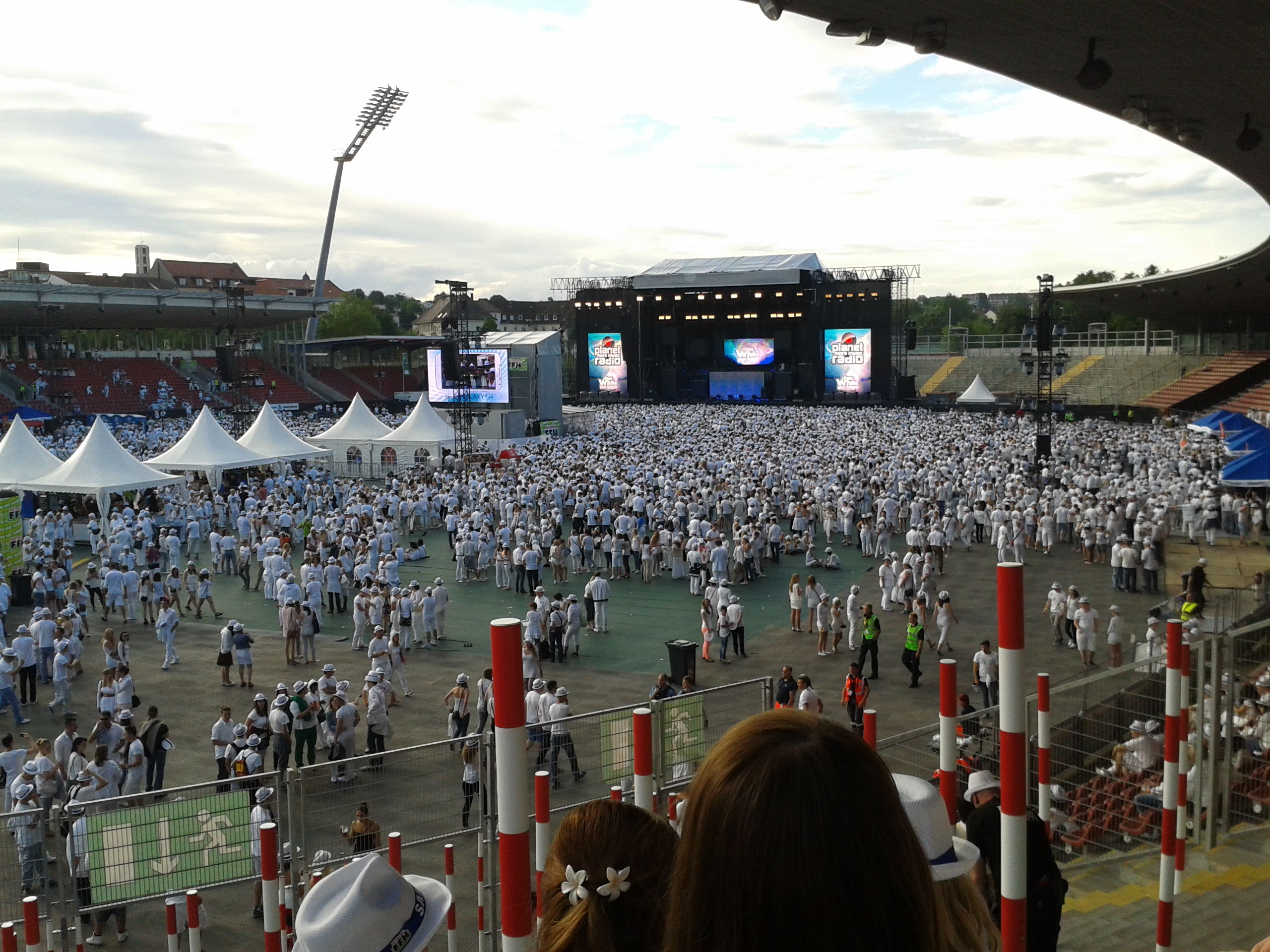
Just White theme at Auestadion music event for Hessentag 2013

The Auestadion has twice hosted the German Athletics Championships in 2011 and 2016. Established in 1898, the German Athletics Championships is a major annual national tournament for German track and field athletics for both men and women. The Auestadion is one of fourteen venues to host the German Championships since the Championships resumed post World War II. The 2011 edition was hosted over two days on 23–24 July 2011. Two championship records were set at the stadium for women's hammer throw by Betty Heidler and javelin throw by Christina Obergföll. The 2016 Championships were contested on 18–19 June 2016. One championship record was set by Gesa Felicitas Krause in the women's 3000 metres steeplechase.

=== Hessentag ===
The Auestadion has hosted musical concerts during the two Hessentag festivals Kassel has hosted in 1964 and 2013. In 1964 it was estimated that 50,000 people packed into the stadium for the music concert. No official number was counted as the rush of people meant the stadium gates were just opened. The Auestadion event included acts from 350 members of the Federal Border Police who danced before laying on the stadium grass to form the letters Hessentag with their bodies. There was a 1,000 person choir as well as international military bands from the United States, England, Belgium and France. In addition, there was also the Army Music Corps II, the motorcycle squadron of the riot police as well as folk dance and costume groups. In 2013 the stadium hosted 3 Doors Down, Die Toten Hosen, Unheilig, Helene Fischer, Philipp Poisel, David Garrett, Die Ärzte and held a Just White at the Hessentag 2013 theme.

== Domestic league football ==
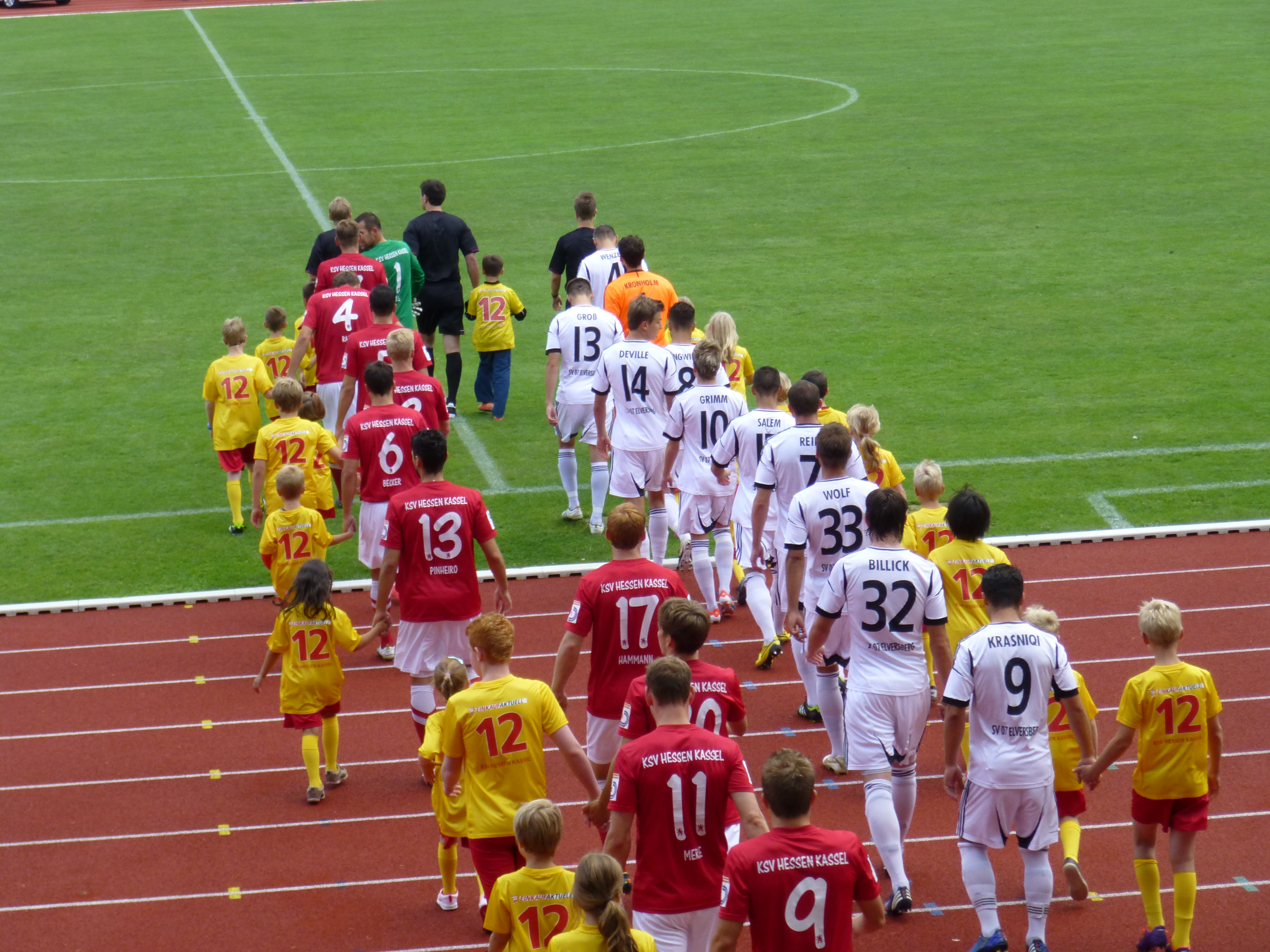
Hessen Kassel team walking out onto the Auestadion pitch for a Regionalliga football match in 2012 vs SV Elversberg

=== KSV Hessen Kassel ===
As of 2020, KSV Hessen Kassel are the current football tenant of the Auestadion. It has been their home ground since opening in August 1953. Hessen Kassel did re-located for three seasons away from Auestadion between 1998 and 2001. The club had been relegated from division three to division eight as it had filed for bankruptcy and re-formed. Kassel did not need to play in such a large stadium in the lower leagues. KSV instead played in a neighbouring field, the G-Platz, with a spectator capacity of 2,000. Kassel fans dubbed this small ground the "lion cage". Once KSV had got themselves promoted to division five (Landesliga) in 2001, they returned to playing home matches at the Auestadion.

=== KSV Baunatal ===
For four years between 1976 and 1979, KSV Baunatal played home matches at the Auestadion. Baunatal were crowned champions of Oberliga Hessen in 1975/76 and were promoted to 2.Bundesliga. Their normal home ground, the Parkstadion Baunatal, was too small for the 2.Bundesliga so they moved into the Auestadion. After KSV Baunatal finished nineteenth in 1978/79 and were relegated, they left Auestadion and returned to their spiritual home, Parkstadion Baunatal. The highest attendance Baunatal drew at Auestadion was 22,000 fans on 25 August 1976. KSV Baunatal faced 1. FC Nürnberg in the 2.Bundesliga. The match ended in a 2−2 stalemate with Siegfried Bronnert and Jochem Ziegert scoring for KSV and Rudolf Sturz and Dieter Nüssing scoring for the Bavarians.

== International football matches ==
Over the years German national football teams have come to play matches at the Auestadion. In August 2019, the German national women's team faced Montenegro at the stadium in a European Championship 2021 qualifier. The German team, who were world champions at the time, defeated Montenegro 10−0 with German captain Alexandra Popp scoring a hat-trick of goals before being substituted just before the hour mark. The match was watched by 6,275 fans inside the stadium. The German women's team had previously played two other matches at the stadium. In May 2008 when they faced and defeated Wales 4−0 in a Euro 2009 qualifier. In September 2001, The German women took on England in a FIFA World Cup qualifier in front of 7,720 fans. Germany defeated England 3−1 with two goals to striker Sandra Smisek, one goal to Martina Müller and a consolation goal for England scored by Rachel Yankey. The German women's U20 national team under the guidance of Maren Meinert played a friendly at the stadium in October 2015 against Sweden. Both sides used the match as preparation for the 2016 FIFA U-20 Women's World Cup in Papua New Guinea. Sweden won the match 1−0 with the second half goal in the 53rd minute to Anna Oskarsson. The City of Kassel arranged for 200 refugees to attend the match. In September 2016, the German U21 national team played a friendly match at Auestadion against Slovakia. The match marked the U21 national team head coach debut of Stefan Kuntz. In front of 6,890 fans, Germany won the match 3−0 with goals to Grischa Prömel, Niklas Stark and Levin Öztunali. Previously, the U21 national men's team had played two matches at the stadium. In October 2013, Germany played the Faroe Islands in a 2015 U21 Euro qualifier. In a close match, Germany prevailed 3−2 winners in front of 8,340 spectators. Robin Knoche, Kevin Volland and Amin Younes scored the goals for the home team, Árni Frederiksberg and Hørður Askham scored for the visitors. In March 2011. Germany took on Italy U21s in a friendly match. With 16,368 supporters in attendance, Italy and Germany played out a 2−2 draw. Germany took a 2−0 lead through two goals to Lewis Holtby before Italy staged a comeback to draw level with late second half goals to Manolo Gabbiadini and Fabio Borini. The attendance for the match broke a German record for an under 21 game. On 16 September 2011, the German U17 national team played at the stadium in a friendly match against Israel. Germany proved too good for the visitors and claimed a 5−0 victory. Said Benkarit scored a hat-trick before Max Meyer and Serge Gnabry completed the rout.

German National Team football matches at Auestadion
Date	Type	Event	Home	Result	Away	Attendance
27 SEP 2001	Women's international	2003 FIFA Women's World Cup qualifier	Germany	3:1	England	7,720
29 MAY 2008	Women's international	2009 UEFA Women's Euro qualifier	Germany	4:0	Wales	16,283
29 MAR 2011	U21 men's international	Friendly	Germany	2:2	Italy	16,368
16 SEP 2011	U17 men's international	Friendly	Germany	5:0	Israel	−
15 OCT 2013	U21 men's international	2015 UEFA U21 Men's Euro qualifier	Germany	3:2	Faroe Islands	8,340
21 OCT 2015	U20 Women's international	Friendly	Germany	0:1	Sweden	−
2 SEP 2016	U21 men's international	Friendly	Germany	3:0	Slovakia	6,890
31 AUG 2019	Women's international	2021 UEFA Women's Euro qualifier	Germany	10:0	Montenegro	6,275

== Records ==
The official attendance record for the Auestadion is 37,000 spectators. This record was set in 1964 with the Bundesliga promotion play-off match between KSV Hessen Kassel and Hannover 96. Hannover defeated the home team to win the match 2–1. There is however a report of 40,000 people attending a DFB-Pokal match in January 1965 at the stadium. KSV played Bundesliga club Hamburger SV (HSV, Hamburg) and lost 2–0 with goals to Uwe Seeler (12th minute) and Charly Dörfel (57th minute). The official crowd number was 33,000 but Kassel police reported there was 40,000 spectators in attendance. The number of fans buckled the railings in the standing areas. Children were passed down onto the playing ground to ensure their safety. The right hand side gate of the grandstand was pushed down and fans flooded into the playing area. The stewards and the police were powerless, and spectators were standing all around the corner flags. The referee, Wilfried Hilker, delayed the start of the match so authorities could regain control and push the fans back from the edge of the field but eventually he got the match underway when it became apparent this was impossible to do.

== Gallery ==
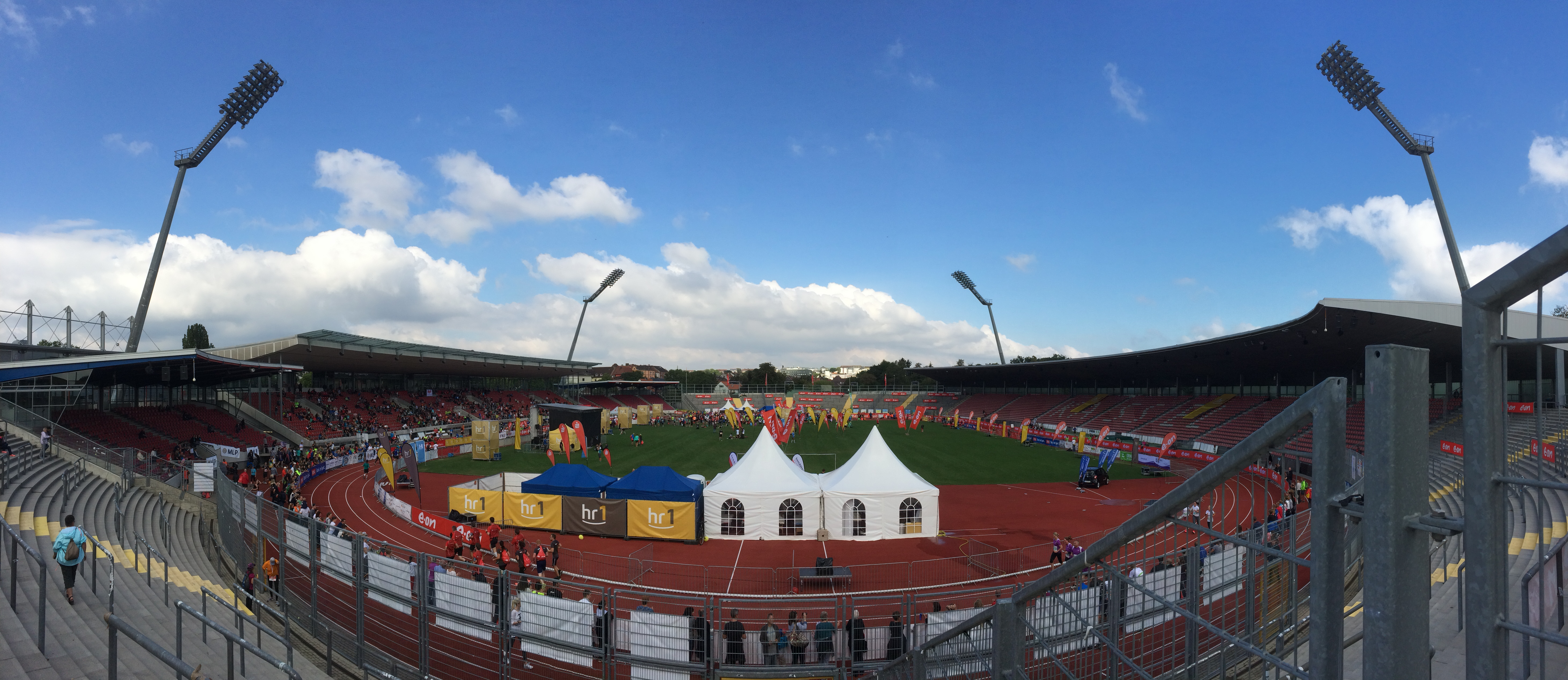
Auestadion, 2016, E.ON Kassel-Marathon
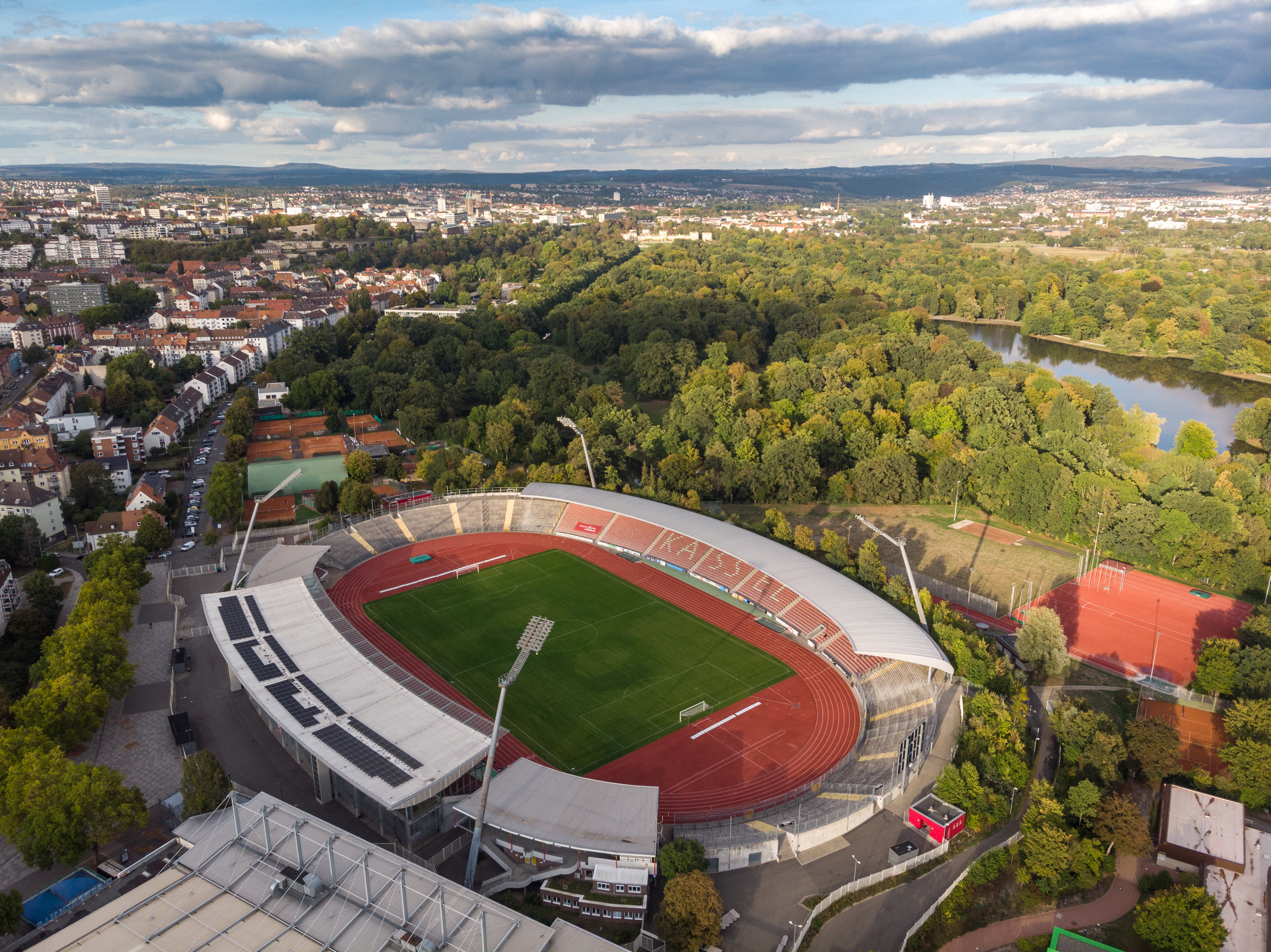
Aerial view of Auestadion and part of Karlsaue park

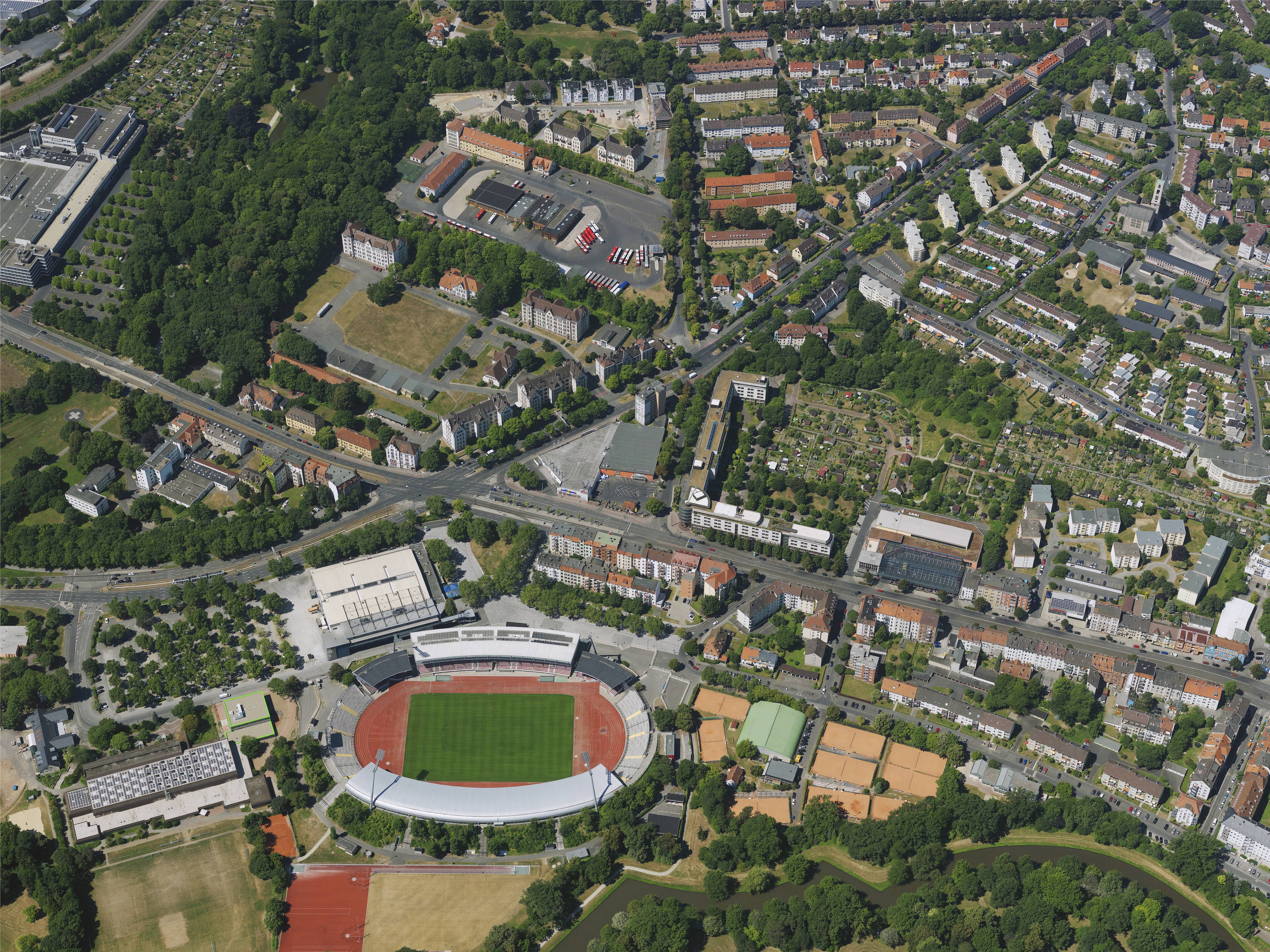
High aerial view of Auestadion and surrounds

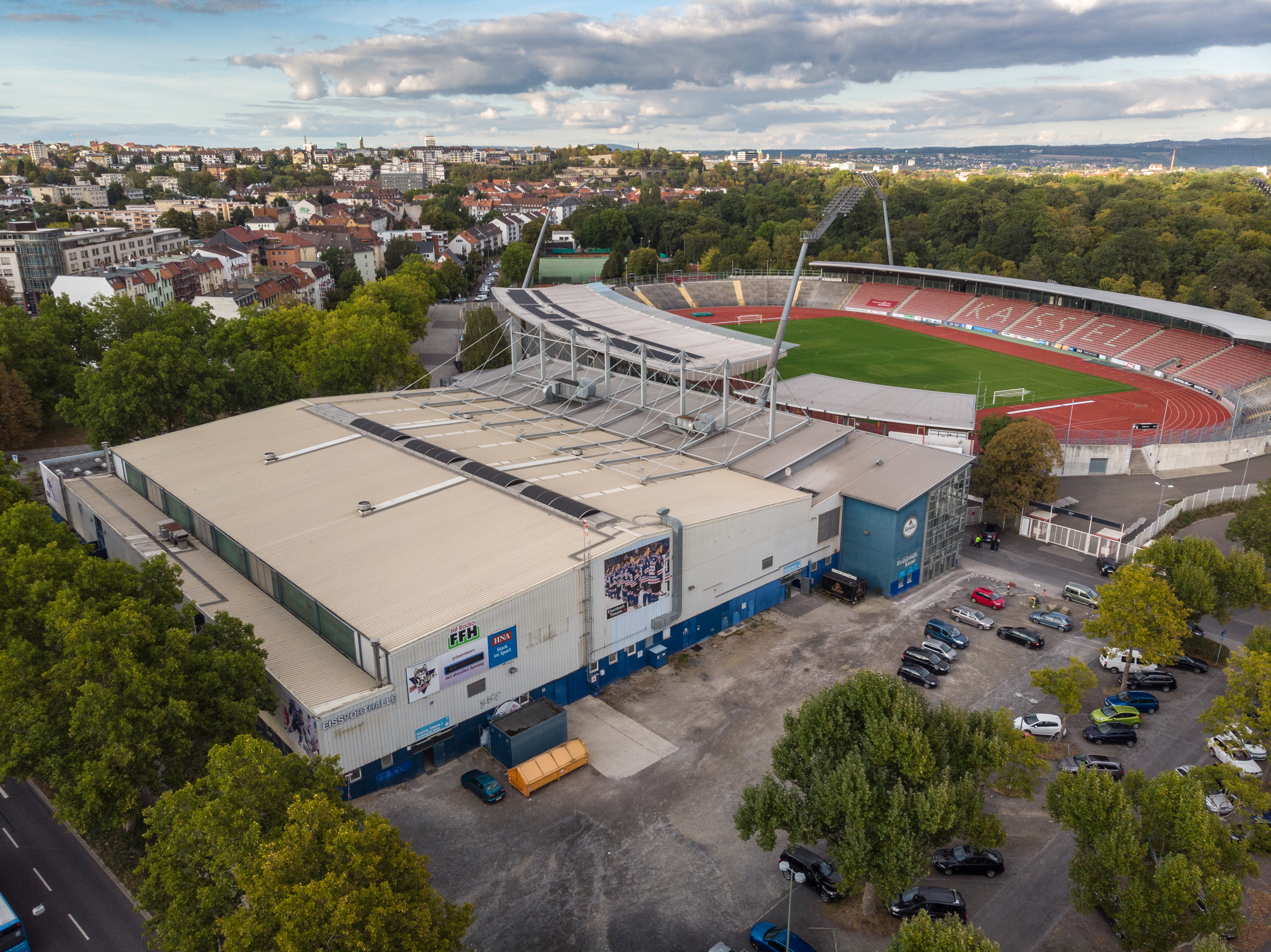
Aerial view of Auestadion and Eissporthalle Kassel

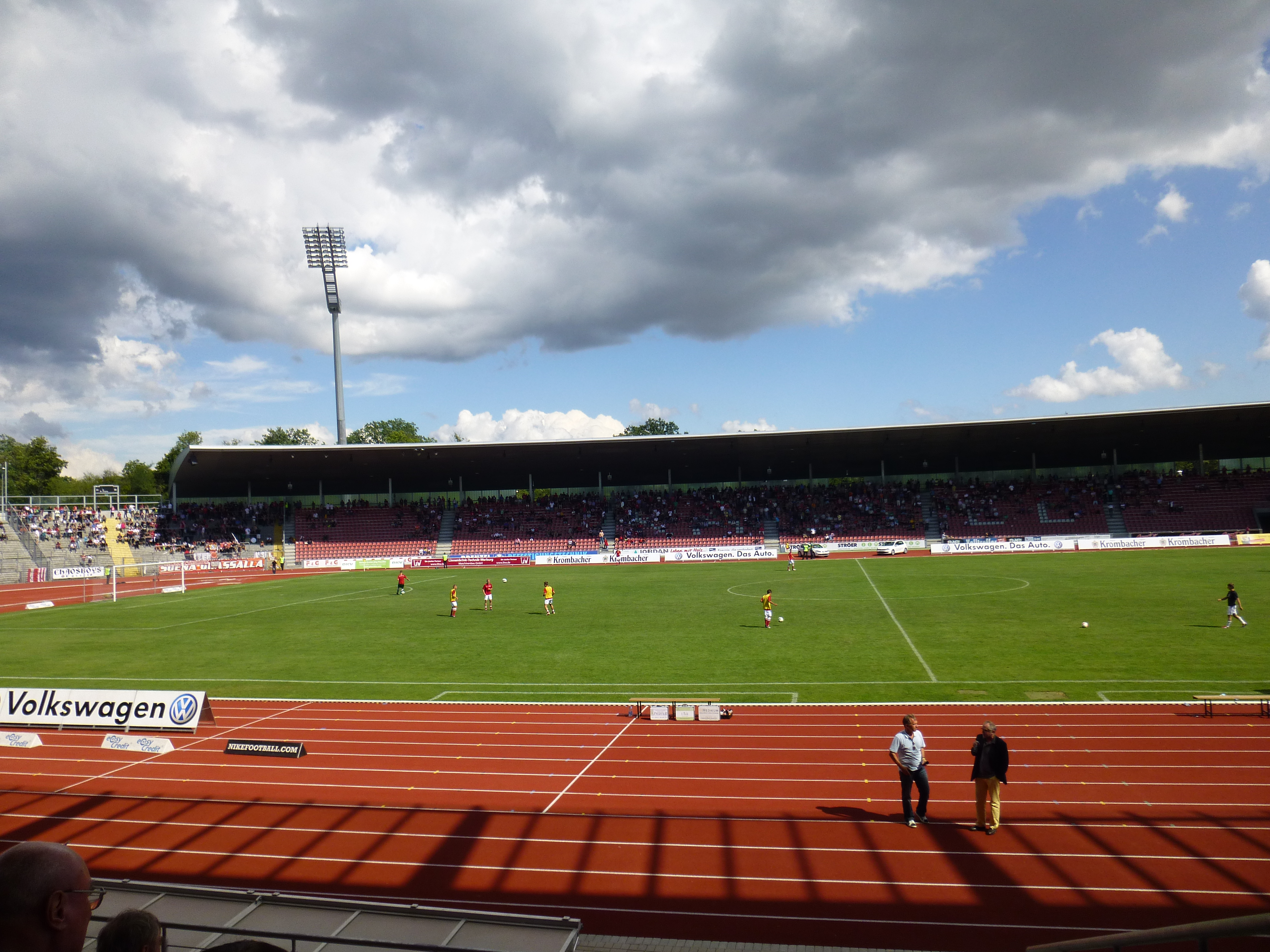
View from the new Auestadian grandstand across the field of play towards the eastern stand

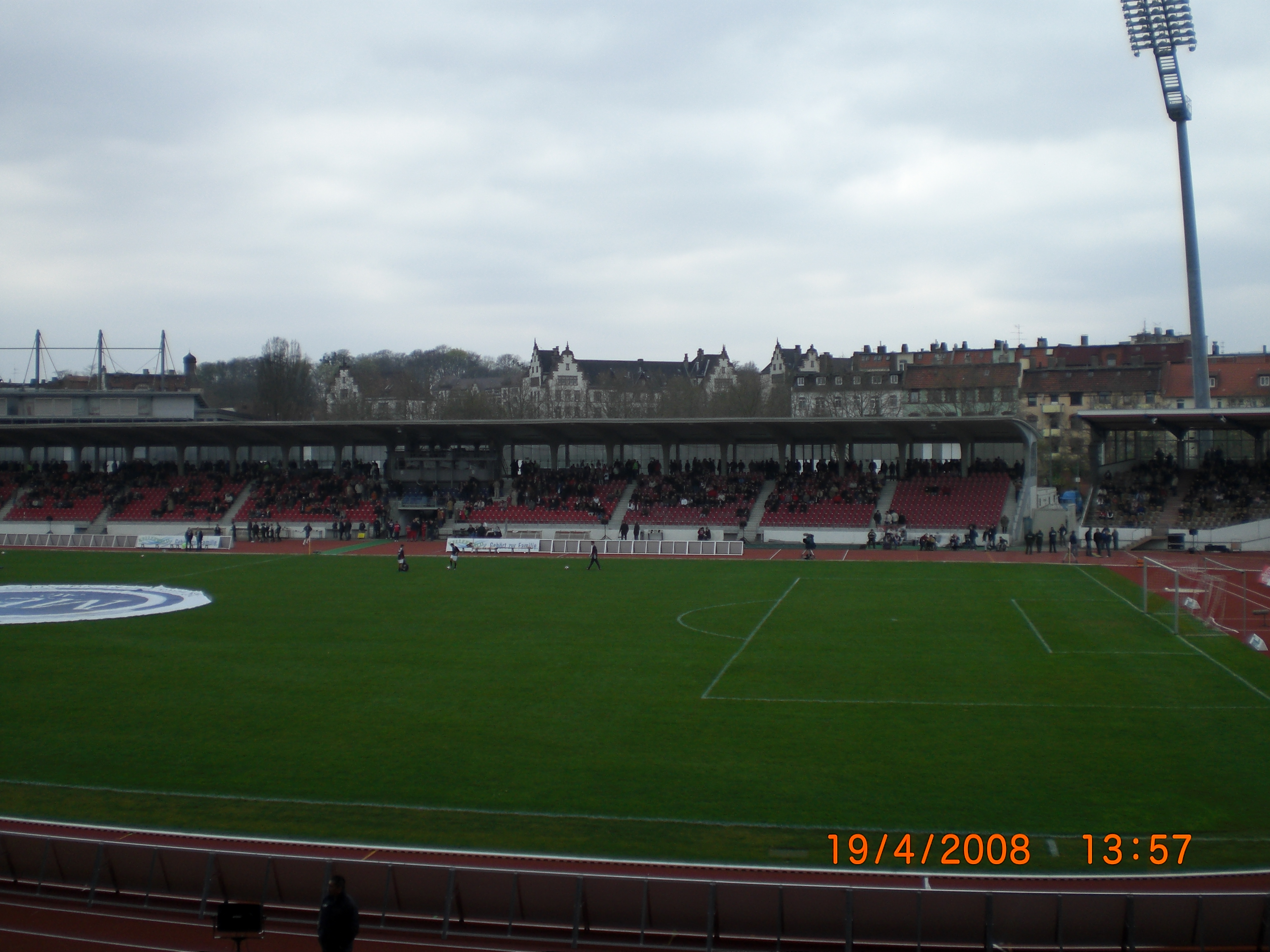
View of the old Auestadian grandstand from 2008

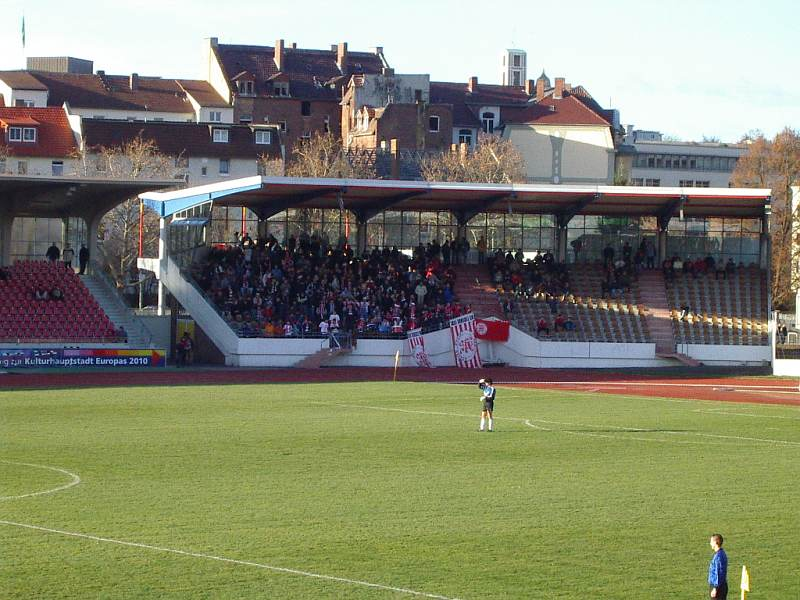
View of KSV fans inside one of the stands designed by Norbert Harle and built in the 1980s

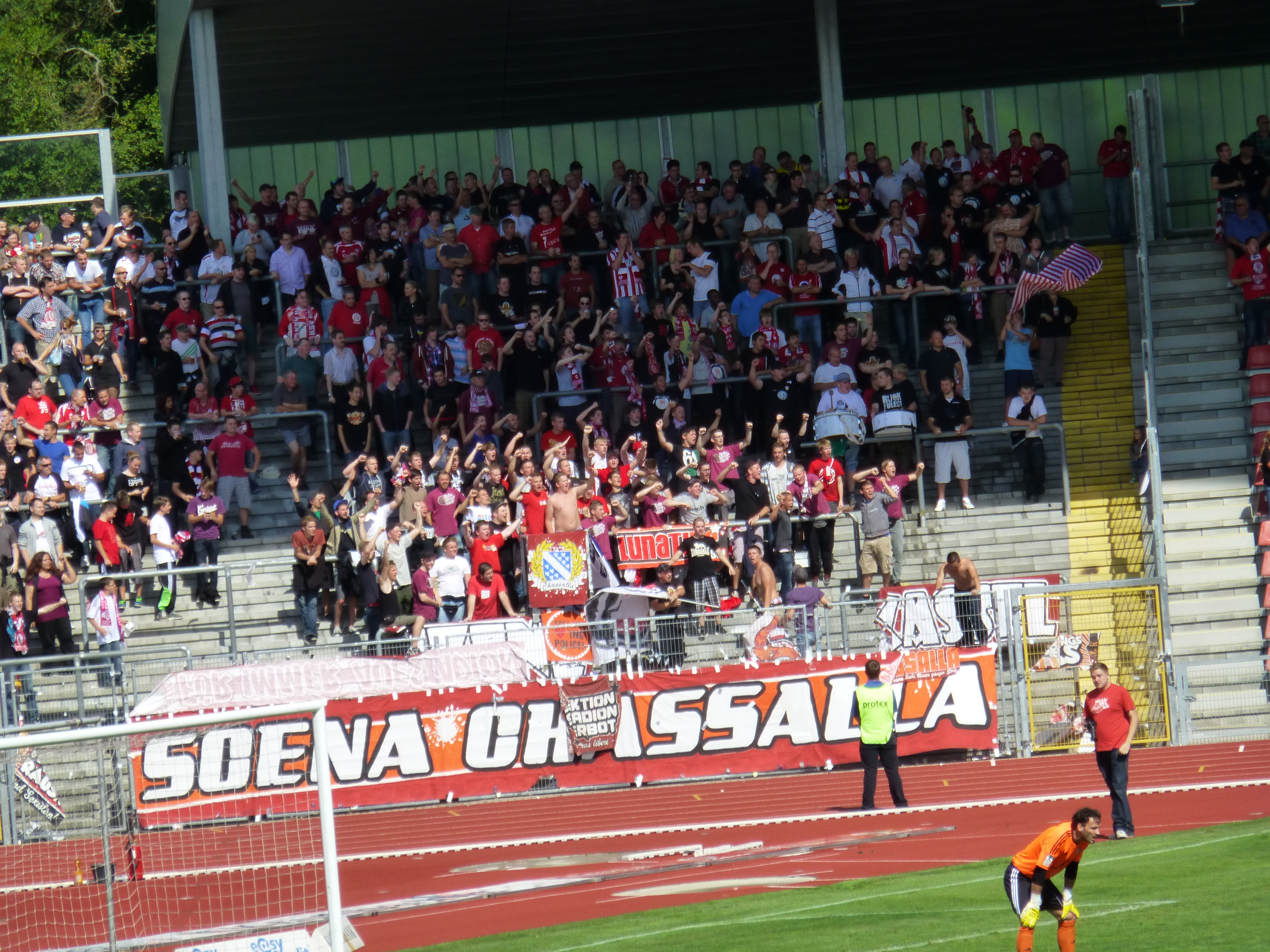
KSV Hessen Kassel fans in Block 30 of the Auestadion
