= Radomir Antić Stadium =

Stadium in Serbia

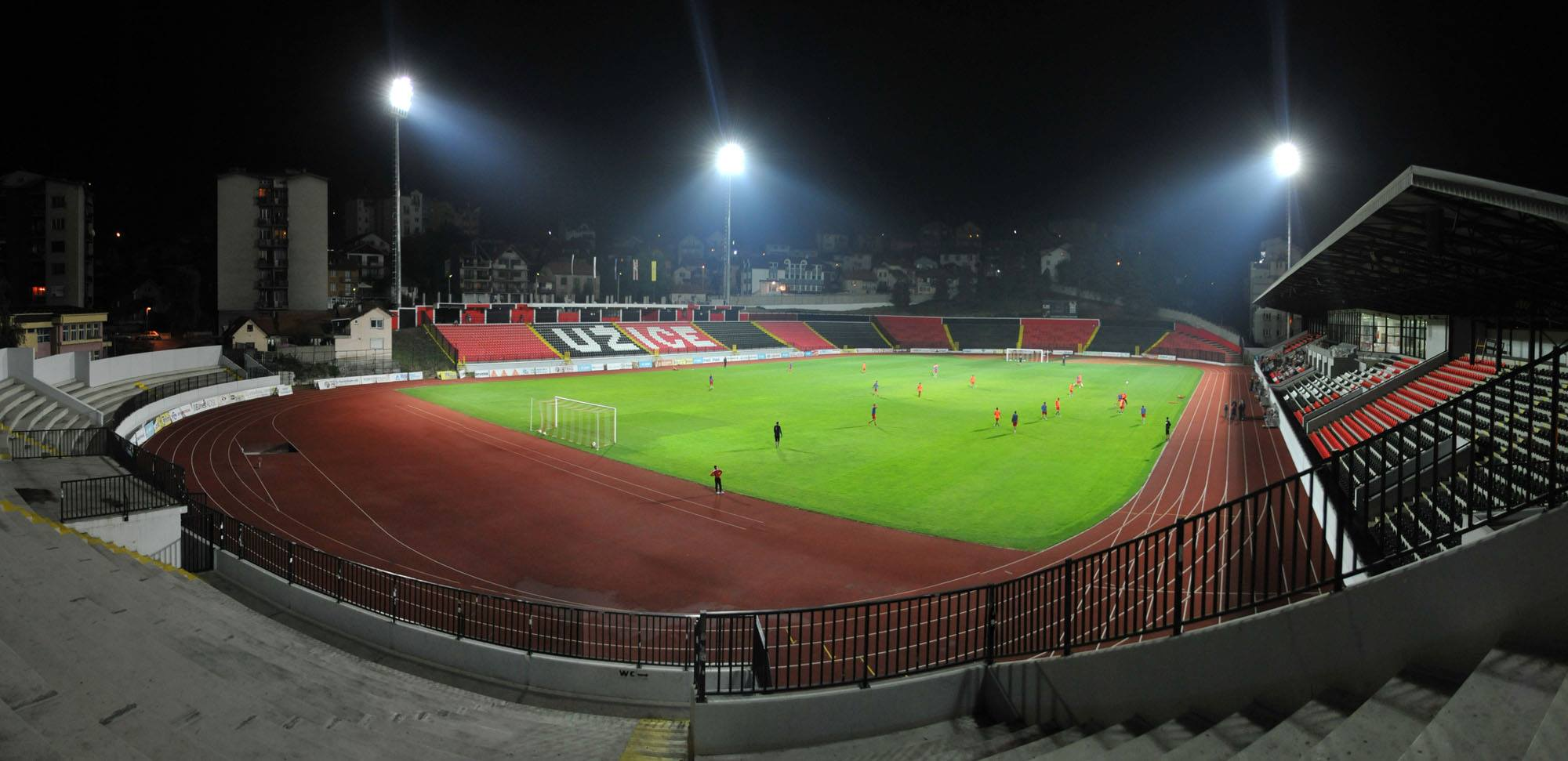
- The stadium pictured at night in 2013
- Interactive map of Radomir Antić Stadium
- Former names: Stadion 24. September; Stadion Željko Rašić; Užice City Stadium
- Location: Užice, Serbia
- Coordinates: 43.851564°N 19.846796°E
- Owner: City of Užice
- Capacity: 9,949
- Surface: Grass

Construction
- Opened: 24 September 1946; 79 years ago
- Renovated: 2011

Tenants
- FK Sloboda Užice (2011—present); FK Zlatibor Čajetina (2020—2022)

The Radomir Antić Stadium (Serbian: Стадион Радомир Антић / Stadion Radomir Antić), also nicknamed Begluk, is a multi-purpose stadium in Užice, Serbia. It is mainly used for football matches and hosts the home matches of FK Sloboda Užice of the Serbian First League. The stadium has a total capacity of 12,000.

== History ==
The stadium was opened on 24 September 1946. It underwent full renovation in 2011. The first official match on the renovated stadium was on 21 August 2011 between Sloboda and Partizan. In front of 12,000 supporters, Sloboda recorded their first ever win over Partizan in that match, with a goal from Slavko Marić in the 93rd minute. On 6 September 2011, the Serbia U21s played against Faroe Islands in their 2013 UEFA European U21 Championship qualifying match and won 5–1.

In July 2013, it was announced that the stadium will have floodlights for the first time in the club's history, and that the first game under the floodlights would be 2 months later, against Partizan on 14 September 2013. On 19 November 2013, the Serbia national team played the "Media Selection team" in a revival match. The national team won the game 2–0.

On 25 May 2016, the stadium was the host to a friendly match between Serbia and Cyprus. It was Slavoljub Muslin's first game in charge as the head coach of the national team. Serbia won the game 2–1 with the help of Aleksandar Mitrović and Dušan Tadić goals.

On 12 August 2021, the name of the stadium was officially changed to Radomir Antić Stadium in honour of Radomir Antić.

=== International football matches ===
Date		Result		Competition
6 September 2011	Serbia U21	5–1	Faroe Islands U21	2013 UEFA European U21 Championship qualifying
25 May 2016	Serbia	2–1	Cyprus	Friendly
