= Filip Timov =

German-born Macedonian footballer (born 1992)

Personal information
- Date of birth: 22 May 1992 (age 34)
- Place of birth: Bonn, Germany
- Height: 1.82 m (6 ft 0 in)
- Position: Striker

Team information
- Current team: FV Bonn-Endenich

Senior career*
Years	Team	Apps	(Gls)
–2011	Belasica		
2011	Koper	4	(0)
2011	→ Ankaran Hrvatini (loan)		
2012–2013	Impulse	38	(8)
2013–2014	Aris Limassol	24	(4)
2014	Concordia Chiajna	4	(0)
2015	Banants	12	(1)
2015–2016	Horizont Turnovo	14	(4)
2017–2018	Sileks	41	(6)
2018-	FV Bonn-Endenich	12	(7)

International career
2008	Macedonia U17	3	(0)
2010–2011	Macedonia U19	12	(2)
2012–2013	Macedonia U21	11	(1)
- * Club domestic league appearances and goals as of 28 August 2017

Filip Timov (born 22 May 1992) is a German-born Macedonian footballer who plays for German lower league side FV Bonn-Endenich as a winger.

== Club career ==
In the 2012–13 season he played for Armenian Club Impulse where he finished the season as one of the top 10 Scorers of the Armenian Premier League that year.

In 2013, he joined Aris Limassol in Cyprus.

== International career ==
In 2012, he debuted for the Macedonian U21 National Team, and since then he has made 11 appearances and scored 1 goal in an away game against Northern Ireland U21 during the Euro U21 2013 Qualifications.
