= 2013 UEFA European Under-21 Championship qualification Group 4 =

Football tournament qualification stage

The teams competing in Group 4 of the 2013 UEFA European Under-21 Championship qualifying competition were Denmark, Faroe Islands, Macedonia, Northern Ireland, and Serbia.

== Standings ==
Pos	Team	Pld	W	D	L	GF	GA	GD	Pts	Qualification	(Serbia)	(Denmark)	(North Macedonia)	(Northern Ireland)	(Faroe Islands)
1	Serbia	8	5	3	0	17	4	+13	18	Play-offs	—	0–0	5–1	1–0	5–1
2	Denmark	8	4	4	0	19	8	+11	16	Play-offs	1–1	—	6–5	3–0	4–0
3	Macedonia	8	3	3	2	14	15	−1	12		1–1	1–1	—	1–0	1–0
4	Northern Ireland	8	1	1	6	5	13	−8	4		0–2	0–3	1–3	—	4–0
5	Faroe Islands	8	0	3	5	3	18	−15	3		0–2	1–1	1–1	0–0	—

== Results and fixtures ==
31 May 2011
20:00

Faroe Islands	0–0	Northern Ireland
	Report

Gundadalur, Tórshavn
Referee: Andris Treimanis (Latvia)

10 August 2011
15:00

Northern Ireland	4–0	Faroe Islands
Kee 25', 29', 75'; Magennis 32'	Report

The Oval, Belfast
Referee: Tero Nieminen (Finland)

2 September 2011
16:30

Serbia	1–0	Northern Ireland
Milivojević 17'	Report

Stadion Karađorđe, Novi Sad
Referee: Danny Makkelie (Netherlands)

6 September 2011
15:00

Northern Ireland	0–3	Denmark
	Report	Helenius 6'; Laudrup 81'; Larsen 88'

The Oval, Belfast
Referee: Deniz Aytekin (Germany)
6 September 2011
16:30

Serbia	5–1	Faroe Islands
Kojić 15'; Nastasić 18'; Lazović 26', 81'; Milunović 39'	Report	Jakobsen 7'

Gradski stadion, Užice
Referee: Enea Jorgji (Albania)

7 October 2011
15:00

Macedonia	1–1	Serbia
Hasani 89' (pen.)	Report	Marković 73'

Boris Trajkovski Stadium, Skopje
Referee: Serhiy Boiko (Ukraine)
7 October 2011
18:00

Denmark	4–0	Faroe Islands
Falk 15'; Albæk 17'; Helenius 60'; Larsen 69'	Report

Aalborg Stadion, Aalborg
Referee: István Kovács (Romania)

11 October 2011
15:00

Serbia	0–0	Denmark
	Report

Stadion Čika Dača, Kragujevac
Referee: Liran Liany (Israel)

11 November 2011
13:00

Macedonia	1–0	Faroe Islands
Fazli 41'	Report

Boris Trajkovski Stadium, Skopje
Referee: Thoroddur Hjaltalin (Iceland)

15 November 2011
13:00

Macedonia	1–1	Denmark
Nestorovski 78'	Report	Helenius 73'

Boris Trajkovski Stadium, Skopje
Referee: João Capela (Portugal)
15 November 2011
15:00

Northern Ireland	0–2	Serbia
	Report	Marković 80'; Gudelj 83' (pen.)

The Showgrounds, Coleraine
Referee: Sergejus Slyva (Lithuania)

10 May 2012
16:30

Macedonia	1–0	Northern Ireland
Urdinov 83' (pen.)	Report

Milano Arena, Kumanovo
Referee: Davit Kharitonashvili (Georgia)

1 June 2012
20:00

Faroe Islands	1–1	Macedonia
Ristevski 54' (o.g.)	Report	Nestorovski 77'

Gundadalur, Tórshavn
Referee: Nerijus Dunauskas (Lithuania)

5 June 2012
14:30

Denmark	6–5	Macedonia
Albæk 6' (pen.); Christiansen 19', 37'; Sviatchenko 25'; Helenius 45'; Larsen 55'	Report	Spirovski 26'; Nestorovski 65'; Bogdanović 68'; Tairi 83'; Fazli 88'

Aalborg Stadion, Aalborg
Referee: Bobby Madden (Scotland)
5 June 2012
20:00

Faroe Islands	0–2	Serbia
	Report	Malbašić 30'; Gudelj 67' (pen.)

Gundadalur, Tórshavn
Referee: Padraig Sutton (Republic of Ireland)

15 August 2012
20:00

Faroe Islands	1–1	Denmark
Jakobsen 87'	Report	Makienok 42'

Gundadalur, Tórshavn
Referee: Gerhard Grobelnik (Austria)

7 September 2012
18:00

Denmark	1–1	Serbia
Makienok 36'	Report	Ninković 84'

Aalborg Stadion, Aalborg
Referee: Clément Turpin (France)
7 September 2012
20:30

Northern Ireland	1–3	Macedonia
Magennis 10'	Report	Spirovski 48'; Timov 72'; Stankov 90+2'

The Oval, Belfast
Referee: Mihály Fábián (Hungary)

10 September 2012
19:00

Denmark	3–0	Northern Ireland
Larsen 8'; Albæk 28' (pen.); Laudrup 45+1'	Report

Aalborg Stadion, Aalborg
Referee: Alan Mario Sant (Malta)
10 September 2012
19:00

Serbia	5–1	Macedonia
Mudrinski 10'; Milunović 39'; Jojić 67', 70'; Malbašić 81'	Report	Fazli 77'

Stadion Mladost, Kruševac
Referee: Oliver Drachta (Austria)

== Goalscorers ==
4 goals

- (Denmark) Nicklas Helenius
- (Denmark) Emil Larsen

3 goals

- (Denmark) Mads Albæk
- (North Macedonia) Samir Fazli
- (North Macedonia) Ilija Nestorovski
- (Northern Ireland) Billy Kee

2 goals

- (Denmark) Anders Christiansen
- (Denmark) Andreas Laudrup
- (Denmark) Simon Makienok
- (Faroe Islands) Róaldur Jakobsen
- (North Macedonia) Stefan Spirovski
- (Northern Ireland) Josh Magennis
- (Serbia) Nemanja Gudelj
- (Serbia) Miloš Jojić
- (Serbia) Darko Lazović
- (Serbia) Filip Malbašić
- (Serbia) Saša Marković
- (Serbia) Luka Milunović

1 goal

- (Denmark) Rasmus Falk
- (Denmark) Erik Sviatchenko
- (North Macedonia) Goran Bogdanović
- (North Macedonia) Ferhan Hasani
- (North Macedonia) Aleksandar Stankov
- (North Macedonia) Flamur Tairi
- (North Macedonia) Filip Timov
- (North Macedonia) Yani Urdinov
- (Serbia) Nemanja Kojić
- (Serbia) Luka Milivojević
- (Serbia) Ognjen Mudrinski
- (Serbia) Matija Nastasić
- (Serbia) Nikola Ninković

1 own goal

- (North Macedonia) Kire Ristevski (playing against Faroe Islands)
