= 2021 UEFA European Under-21 Championship qualification Group 6 =

Football tournament qualification stage

Group 6 of the 2021 UEFA European Under-21 Championship qualifying competition consisted of six teams: Spain, Israel, Montenegro, North Macedonia, Kazakhstan, and Faroe Islands. The composition of the nine groups in the qualifying group stage was decided by the draw held on 11 December 2018, 09:00 CET (UTC+1), at the UEFA headquarters in Nyon, Switzerland, with the teams seeded according to their coefficient ranking.

The group was originally scheduled to be played in home-and-away round-robin format between 6 June 2019 and 13 October 2020. Under the original format, the group winners and the best runners-up among all nine groups (not counting results against the sixth-placed team) would qualify directly for the final tournament, while the remaining eight runners-up would advance to the play-offs.

On 17 March 2020, all matches were put on hold due to the COVID-19 pandemic. On 17 June 2020, UEFA announced that the qualifying group stage would be extended and end on 17 November 2020, while the play-offs, originally scheduled to be played in November 2020, would be cancelled. Instead, the group winners and the five best runners-up among all nine groups (not counting results against the sixth-placed team) would qualify for the final tournament.

== Standings ==
| Pos | Team | Pld | W | D | L | GF | GA | GD | Pts | Qualification | Spain | North Macedonia | Israel | Kazakhstan | Faroe Islands | Montenegro |
|---|---|---|---|---|---|---|---|---|---|---|---|---|---|---|---|---|
| 1 | Spain | 10 | 9 | 1 | 0 | 20 | 1 | +19 | 28 | Final tournament | — | 3–0 | 3–0 | 3–0 | 2–0 | 2–0 |
| 2 | North Macedonia | 10 | 5 | 3 | 2 | 20 | 12 | +8 | 18 | | 0–1 | — | 1–1 | 1–1 | 7–1 | 2–1 |
| 3 | Israel | 10 | 3 | 4 | 3 | 12 | 14 | −2 | 13 | | 1–1 | 1–1 | — | 1–2 | 3–1 | 0–0 |
| 4 | Kazakhstan | 10 | 3 | 1 | 6 | 12 | 21 | −9 | 10 | | 0–1 | 1–4 | 1–2 | — | 2–3 | 0–4 |
| 5 | Faroe Islands | 10 | 3 | 0 | 7 | 11 | 25 | −14 | 9 | | 0–2 | 1–2 | 3–1 | 1–3 | — | 1–0 |
| 6 | Montenegro | 10 | 2 | 1 | 7 | 11 | 13 | −2 | 7 | | 0–2 | 1–2 | 1–2 | 1–2 | 3–0 | — |

Source: UEFA
Rules for classification: Tiebreakers

== Matches ==
Times are CET/CEST, (Note: CEST (UTC+2) for dates between 31 March and 26 October 2019 and between 29 March and 24 October 2020, and CET (UTC+1) for all other dates.) as listed by UEFA (local times, if different, are in parentheses).

6 June 2019
18:00 (17:00 WEST)

| Faroe Islands | 1–3 | Kazakhstan |
|---|---|---|
| Radosavljevic 85' | Report | Bakhtiyarov 2'; Bachek 68'; Prokopenko 90+4' |

Svangaskarð, Toftir
Attendance: 213
Referee: Iwan Arwel Griffith (Wales)

11 June 2019
20:30

| Montenegro | 1–2 | Kazakhstan |
|---|---|---|
| Tursynbay 3' (o.g.) | Report | Seydakhmet 62'; Karimov 90+4' |

Podgorica City Stadium, Podgorica
Attendance: 1,000
Referee: Giorgi Kruashvili (Georgia)

6 September 2019
15:00 (19:00 ALMT)

| Kazakhstan | 0–1 | Spain |
|---|---|---|
| | Report | Olmo 28' (pen.) |

Astana Arena, Nur-Sultan
Attendance: 5,149
Referee: Nicholas Walsh (Scotland)
6 September 2019
20:00

| Montenegro | 3–0 | Faroe Islands |
|---|---|---|
| Krstović 19', 30' (pen.); Vukotić 44' (pen.) | Report |

Gradski stadion, Nikšić
Attendance: 438
Referee: Barbeno Luca (San Marino)

10 September 2019
15:00 (19:00 ALMT)

| Kazakhstan | 1–2 | Israel |
|---|---|---|
| Shvyrev 22' | Report | Almog 2'; Yosefi 83' |

Astana Arena, Nur-Sultan
Attendance: 1,500
Referee: Zaven Hovhannisyan (Armenia)
10 September 2019
16:00

| North Macedonia | 7–1 | Faroe Islands |
|---|---|---|
| Mitrovski 26', 45+3', 85'; Churlinov 32', 88'; Daci 59'; Lichina 62' | Report | Andreasen 19' (pen.) |

Petar Miloševski Training Centre, Skopje
Attendance: 278
Referee: Jason Barcelo (Gibraltar)
10 September 2019
19:45

| Spain | 2–0 | Montenegro |
|---|---|---|
| Olmo 3', 9' | Report |

Nou Estadi Castàlia, Castellón de la Plana
Attendance: 4,669
Referee: Aleksei Matyunin (Russia)

10 October 2019
17:00

| Montenegro | 1–2 | North Macedonia |
|---|---|---|
| Skenderović 10' | Report | Atanasov 14', 33' (pen.) |

DG Arena, Podgorica
Attendance: 1,000
Referee: Stephan Klossner (Switzerland)

15 October 2019
14:30

| North Macedonia | 1–1 | Kazakhstan |
|---|---|---|
| Ristovski 20' | Report | Omirtayev 75' |

Petar Miloševski Training Centre, Skopje
Attendance: 680
Referee: Mykola Balakin (Ukraine)
15 October 2019
18:35 (19:35 IDT)

| Israel | 3–1 | Faroe Islands |
|---|---|---|
| Baribo 8', 53'; Malede 86' | Report | Samuelsen 64' |

HaMoshava Stadium, Petah Tikva
Attendance: 1,050
Referee: Ian McNabb (Northern Ireland)
15 October 2019
18:45

| Montenegro | 0–2 | Spain |
|---|---|---|
| | Report | Buñuel 34'; Cucurella 62' |

Podgorica City Stadium, Podgorica
Attendance: 2,458
Referee: Halil Umut Meler (Turkey)

14 November 2019
19:05 (20:05 IST)

| Israel | 0–0 | Montenegro |
|---|---|---|
| | Report |

Sammy Ofer Stadium, Haifa
Attendance: 2,050
Referee: Iwan Arwel Griffith (Wales)
14 November 2019
19:45

| Spain | 3–0 | North Macedonia |
|---|---|---|
| García 7'; Serafimov 47' (o.g.); Pedrosa 87' | Report |

Estadio Municipal de Santo Domingo, Alcorcón
Attendance: 2,033
Referee: Mads-Kristoffer Kristoffersen (Denmark)

19 November 2019
18:30 (19:30 IST)

| Israel | 1–1 | Spain |
|---|---|---|
| Karzev 81' (pen.) | Report | Óscar 50' |

Ramat Gan Stadium, Ramat Gan
Attendance: 4030
Referee: Duje Strukan (Croatia)

2 September 2020
18:00 (17:00 WEST)

| Faroe Islands | 3–1 | Israel |
|---|---|---|
| Mikkelsen 53'; Radosavljevic 78'; Knudsen 84' | Report | Yosefi 36' (pen.) |

Svangaskarð, Toftir
Attendance: 0 (Note: Due to the COVID-19 pandemic in Europe, all matches scheduled for September 2020 were played behind closed doors.)
Referee: Helgi Mikael Jónasson (Iceland)
3 September 2020
15:00 (19:00 ALMT)

| Kazakhstan | 0–4 | Montenegro |
|---|---|---|
| | Report | Osmajić 59', 65'; Rakonjac 80'; Vukotić 90+3' |

Almaty Central Stadium, Almaty
Attendance: 0
Referee: Rahim Hasanov (Azerbaijan)
3 September 2020 (Note: Five matches originally scheduled to be played in September and October 2020 were rescheduled following postponements to other matches due to the COVID-19 pandemic in Europe.)
18:45

| North Macedonia | 0–1 | Spain |
|---|---|---|
| | Report | Duro 84' (pen.) |

Toše Proeski Arena, Skopje
Attendance: 0
Referee: Horatiu Fesnic (Romania)

8 September 2020 (Note: The match between Faroe Islands and North Macedonia was originally scheduled on 19 November 2019, 17:00 WET, at Tórsvøllur, Tórshavn, but was postponed due to a frozen field. It was originally rescheduled to 4 June 2020, but was postponed to 8 September 2020 due to the COVID-19 pandemic in Europe.)
15:00 (14:00 WEST)

| Faroe Islands | 1–2 | North Macedonia |
|---|---|---|
| Knudsen 85' | Report | Ristovski 17'; Ackovski 81' |

Tórsvøllur, Tórshavn
Attendance: 0
Referee: Rohit Saggi (Norway)
8 September 2020
18:40 (19:40 IDT)

| Israel | 1–2 | Kazakhstan |
|---|---|---|
| Shviro 90+2' | Report | Astanov 45+2'; Omirtayev 90+5' |

Green Stadium, Nof HaGalil
Attendance: 0
Referee: Genc Nuza (Kosovo)

8 October 2020
13:00 (17:00 ALMT)

| Kazakhstan | 1–4 | North Macedonia |
|---|---|---|
| Omirtayev 52' | Report | Churlinov 38', 48'; Atanasov 41'; Mitrovski 67' |

Almaty Central Stadium, Almaty
Attendance: 0
Referee: Lukas Fähndrich (Switzerland)
8 October 2020
18:00

| Montenegro | 1–2 | Israel |
|---|---|---|
| Krstović 50' | Report | Almog 15' (pen.), 83' |

DG Arena, Podgorica
Attendance: 0
Referee: Denys Shurman (Ukraine)
8 October 2020 (Note: All matches originally scheduled to be played in March 2020 were postponed due to the COVID-19 pandemic in Europe. These matches were subsequently rescheduled to be played in October and November 2020.)
18:45 (17:45 WEST)

| Faroe Islands | 0–2 | Spain |
|---|---|---|
| | Report | Brahim 51', 90+1' |

Tórsvøllur, Tórshavn
Attendance: 121
Referee: David Munro (Scotland)

13 October 2020
14:30

| North Macedonia | 1–1 | Israel |
|---|---|---|
| Atanasov 90+5' | Report | Elias 21' |

Petar Miloševski Training Centre, Skopje
Attendance: 0
Referee: Nicholas Walsh (Scotland)
13 October 2020
18:00 (17:00 WEST)

| Faroe Islands | 1–0 | Montenegro |
|---|---|---|
| Radosavljevic 29' | Report |

Svangaskarð, Toftir
Attendance: 0
Referee: Athanasios Tzilos (Greece)
13 October 2020
18:45

| Spain | 3–0 | Kazakhstan |
|---|---|---|
| Guillamón 65'; Gómez 71', 85' | Report |

Estadio Municipal de Santo Domingo, Alcorcón
Attendance: 0
Referee: Volen Chinkov (Bulgaria)

12 November 2020
18:30 (19:30 IST)

| Israel | 1–1 | North Macedonia |
|---|---|---|
| Yosefi 1' | Report | Atanasov 76' |

Netanya Stadium, Netanya
Attendance: 0
Referee: Denys Shurman (Ukraine)
12 November 2020
19:00

| Spain | 2–0 | Faroe Islands |
|---|---|---|
| Pedrosa 67'; López 87' | Report |

Estadio Municipal de Marbella, Marbella
Attendance: 0
Referee: Admir Šehović (Bosnia and Herzegovina)

17 November 2020
12:00 (17:00 ALMT)

| Kazakhstan | 2–3 | Faroe Islands |
|---|---|---|
| Karimov 65'; Omirtayev 81' (pen.) | Report | Radosavljevic 20'; Knudsen 50'; Johannesen 64' |

Kazhymukan Munaitpasov Stadium, Shymkent
Attendance: 0
Referee: Lazar Lukic (Serbia)
17 November 2020
13:30

| North Macedonia | 2–1 | Montenegro |
|---|---|---|
| Gjorgjievski 13'; Miovski 78' (pen.) | Report | N. Krstović 86' |

Petar Miloševski Training Centre, Skopje
Attendance: 0
Referee: Christopher Jaeger (Austria)
17 November 2020
18:45

| Spain | 3–0 | Israel |
|---|---|---|
| López 65' (pen.); Barrenetxea 75'; Moncayola 89' | Report |

Estadio Municipal de Marbella, Marbella
Attendance: 0
Referee: Mario Zebec (Croatia)

== Goalscorers ==
There were 85 goals scored in 30 matches, for an average of 2.83 goals per match.

5 goals

- (North Macedonia) Jani Atanasov

4 goals

- (Faroe Islands) Stefan Radosavljevic
- (Kazakhstan) Oralkhan Omirtayev
- (North Macedonia) Darko Churlinov
- (North Macedonia) Dimitar Mitrovski
- (Montenegro) Nikola Krstović

3 goals

- (Faroe Islands) Petur Knudsen
- (Israel) Eylon Almog
- (Israel) Tomer Yosefi
- (Spain) Dani Olmo

2 goals

- (Israel) Tai Baribo
- (Kazakhstan) Ramazan Karimov
- (Montenegro) Milutin Osmajić
- (Montenegro) Ilija Vukotić
- (North Macedonia) Milan Ristovski
- (Spain) Brahim Díaz
- (Spain) Roberto López
- (Spain) Adrià Pedrosa

1 goal

- (Faroe Islands) Jákup Andreasen
- (Faroe Islands) Jonn Johannesen
- (Faroe Islands) Mads Mikkelsen
- (Faroe Islands) Hugin Samuelsen
- (Israel) Shay Elias
- (Israel) Eden Karzev
- (Israel) Yonas Malede
- (Israel) Itamar Shviro
- (Kazakhstan) Elkhan Astanov
- (Kazakhstan) Dmitriy Bachek
- (Kazakhstan) Akmal Bakhtiyarov
- (Kazakhstan) Vladislav Prokopenko
- (Kazakhstan) Yerkebulan Seydakhmet
- (Kazakhstan) Vyacheslav Shvyrev
- (Montenegro) Marko Rakonjac
- (Montenegro) Meris Skenderović
- (North Macedonia) Kristijan Ackovski
- (North Macedonia) Erdon Daci
- (North Macedonia) Marko Gjorgjievski
- (North Macedonia) Esmin Lichina
- (North Macedonia) Bojan Miovski
- (Spain) Ander Barrenetxea
- (Spain) Aitor Buñuel
- (Spain) Marc Cucurella
- (Spain) Hugo Duro
- (Spain) Manu García
- (Spain) Daniel Gómez
- (Spain) Hugo Guillamón
- (Spain) Jon Moncayola
- (Spain) Óscar

1 own goal

- (North Macedonia) Nikola Serafimov (against Spain)
- (Kazakhstan) Sagadat Tursynbay (against Montenegro)
