= Mădălin Martin =

Romanian footballer

Personal information
- Full name: Mădălin Florin Martin
- Date of birth: 21 June 1992 (age 34)
- Place of birth: Peretu, Romania
- Height: 1.83 m (6 ft 0 in)
- Position: Forward

Team information
- Current team: Axiopolis Cernavodă
- Number: 23

Youth career
- Rapid București

Senior career*
Years	Team	Apps	(Gls)
2013–2016	Rapid București	80	(11)
2016–2017	Politehnica Iași	2	(0)
2017	Metaloglobus București	13	(3)
2018	Argeș Pitești	4	(0)
2019	Daco-Getica București	13	(0)
2019	Progresul 2005		
2020	Farul Constanța	0	(0)
2020–	Axiopolis Cernavodă	10	(1)

International career^{‡}
2013–2014	Romania U-21	5	(2)
- * Club domestic league appearances and goals as of 30 April 2021 ‡ National team caps and goals as of 30 April 2021

Mădălin Florin Martin (born 21 June 1992) is a Romanian professional footballer who plays as a forward for Axiopolis Cernavodă.
