= Hørður Askham =

Faroese footballer (born 1994)

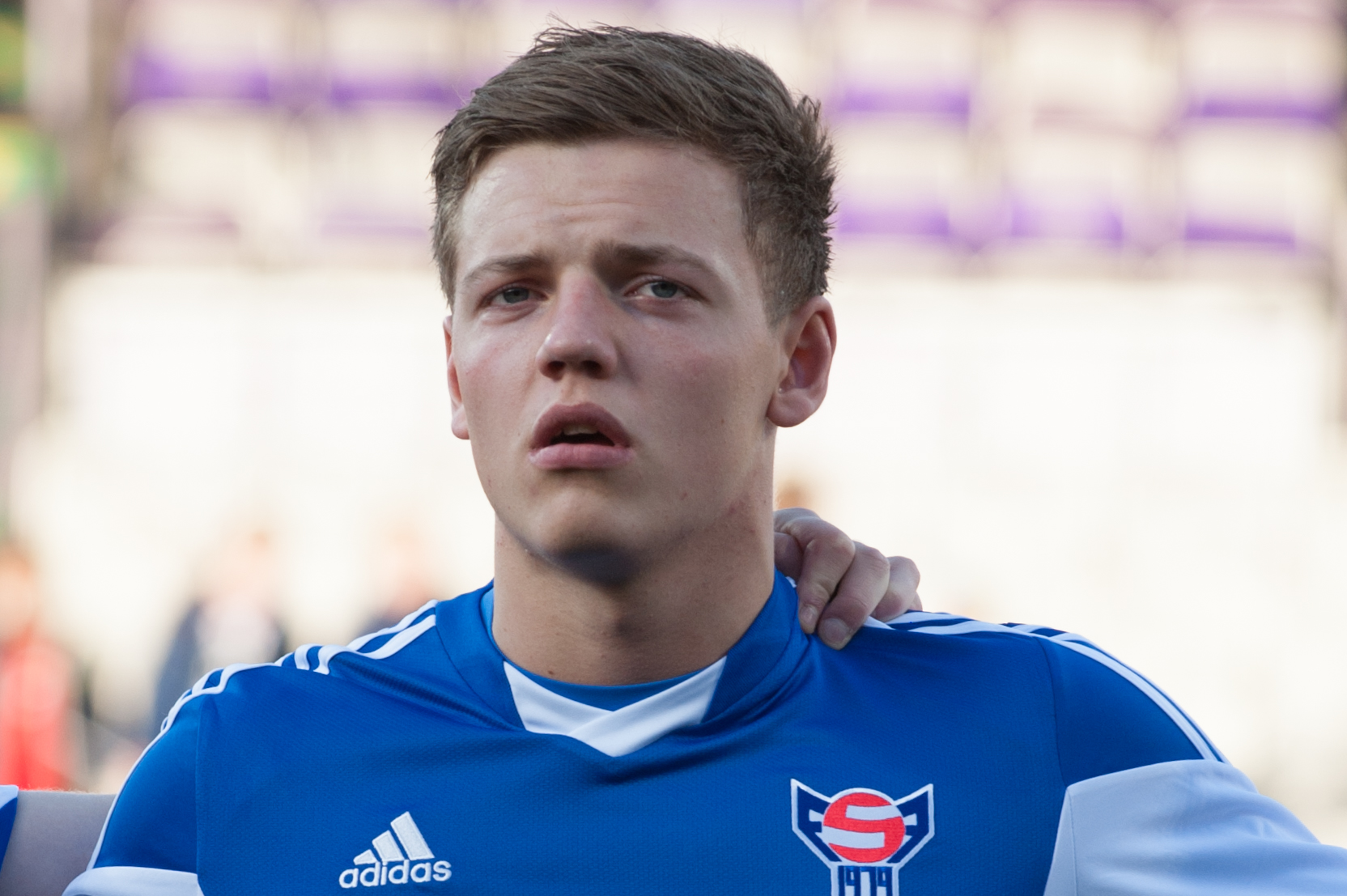

Personal information
- Full name: Hørður Heðinsson Askham
- Date of birth: 22 September 1994 (age 32)
- Place of birth: Faroe Islands
- Position: Midfielder

Team information
- Current team: FC Roskilde
- Number: 5

Senior career*
Years	Team	Apps	(Gls)
2011–2017	B36 Tórshavn	93	(5)
2012–2013	→ 07 Vestur (loan)	11	(1)
2017–2019	KÍ	52	(1)
2019–2023	HB	86	(7)
2023–2024	AB	18	(2)
2024-2026	FC Roskilde	25	(0)

International career^{‡}
2012	Faroe Islands U19	3	(0)
2013–2016	Faroe Islands U21	11	(1)
2019–	Faroe Islands	16	(0)
- * Club domestic league appearances and goals as of 7 October 2025 ‡ National team caps and goals as of 1 April 2024

Hørður Heðinsson Askham (born 22 September 1994) is a Faroese footballer who plays as a midfielder for Danish 2nd Division club FC Roskilde and the Faroe Islands national team.

== Career ==
Askham made his international debut for Faroe Islands on 5 September 2019 in a UEFA Euro 2020 qualifying match against Sweden, which finished as a 0–4 home loss.

On 25 July 2023, Askham moved to Denmark, to play for Danish 2nd Division club AB Gladsaxe. He signed a contract until 30 June 2025. On 15 August 2024 it was confirmed that Askham moved to newly promoted Danish 1st Division club FC Roskilde on a deal until June 2026. He will leave the club on 30 June 2026, when his contract expires.

== Career statistics ==
=== International ===
As of 5 September 2019

Faroe Islands
Year	Apps	Goals
2019	1	0
Total	1	0

== Personal life ==
Askham works as a Builder while also playing football.
