= 2012 Danish Cup final =

- Event: 2011–12 Danish Cup
AC Horsens	F.C. Copenhagen
0	1
- Date: 17 May 2012
- Venue: Parken, Copenhagen
- Man of the Match: Bryan Oviedo
- Referee: Lars Christoffersen
- Attendance: 21,963
- Weather: Few clouds, 11 °C (52 °F)

The 2012 Danish Cup final was a football match that decided the winner of the 2011–12 Danish Cup. It was played on 17 May 2012 at 18:00 CEST.

== Road to the Final ==
As decided by the results of last season's Superliga, Horsens entered the Cup in the second round, Copenhagen in the third round.

AC Horsens	Round	F.C. Copenhagen
Holstebro BK (away); Won 5–0	Second round	—N/a
Akademisk Boldklub (away); Won 3–0	Third round	FC Vestsjælland (away); Won 2–0
Herlev IF (away); Won 3–2	Fourth round	Brøndby IF (away); Won 3–0
FC Fredericia (away); Won 2–1	Quarter-finals	FC Nordsjælland (at home); Won 2–0
HB Køge; Drew first leg (away) 2–2; Won second leg (at home) 1–0; Advanced with 3–2 on aggregate	Semi-finals	SønderjyskE; Won first leg (at home) 1–0; Lost second leg (away) 3–4; Advanced with 4–4 on aggregate on the away goals rule

== Match ==
17 May 2012
18:00 CEST (UTC+02)

AC Horsens	0–1	F.C. Copenhagen
		Claudemir 42'

Parken, Copenhagen
Attendance: 21,963
Referee: Lars Christoffersen

AC Horsens	F.C. Copenhagen

AC HORSENS (4–4–2):
GK	30	(Denmark) Frederik Rønnow
RB	5	(Denmark) Alexander Juel Andersen
CB	3	(Denmark) Morten Rasmussen
CB	4	(Pakistan) Nabil Aslam
LB	2	(Denmark) Anders Nøhr	(substituted off) 80'
RM	15	(Denmark) Lasse Kryger
CM	14	(Denmark) Martin Retov
CM	20	(Denmark) Janus Drachmann
LM	18	(Denmark) Jeppe Mehl
CF	10	(Denmark) Martin Spelmann	(substituted off) 32'
CF	8	(Sweden) Ken Fagerberg	(substituted off) 63'
Substitutions:
	11	(Denmark) Niels Lodberg	(substituted on) 32'
	29	(Denmark) André Bjerregaard	(substituted on) 63'
	13	(Denmark) Thomas Kortegaard	(substituted on) 80'
Manager:
(Denmark) Johnny Mølby

F.C. COPENHAGEN (4–4–2):
GK	1	(Denmark) Kim Christensen
RB	2	(Denmark) Lars Jacobsen
CB	4	(Denmark) Kris Stadsgaard
CB	25	(Denmark) Mathias Jørgensen
LB	19	(Costa Rica) Bryan Oviedo
RM	20	(Denmark) Martin Vingaard
CM	6	(Brazil) Claudemir	(yellow card) 85'
CM	8	(Norway) Christian Grindheim
LM	13	(Senegal) Pape Paté Diouf		(substituted off) 63'
CF	7	(Norway) Mostafa Abdellaoue		(substituted off) 83'
CF	9	(Denmark) Morten Nordstrand		(substituted off) 77'
Substitutions:
	16	(Denmark) Thomas Kristensen		(substituted on) 63'
	14	(Senegal) Dame N'Doye		(substituted on) 77'
	17	(Iceland) Ragnar Sigurðsson		(substituted on) 83'
Manager:
(Denmark) Carsten V. Jensen

Man of the Match (Pokalfighter):
Bryan Oviedo (F.C. Copenhagen)

Assistant referees:
Jakob Bille
Dennis Wollenberg Rasmussen
Fourth official:
Michael Johansen

Match rules:

- 90 minutes
- 30 minutes of extra time if scores level
- Penalty shoot-out if scores still level
- 7 substitutes named, of which three may be used
