= Montenegro national under-21 football team =

National association football team

Montenegro
- Nickname: Hrabri Sokoli (The Brave Falcons)
- Association: Football Association of Montenegro
- Confederation: UEFA (Europe)
- Head coach: Goran Perišić
- Home stadium: Podgorica City Stadium
- FIFA code: MNE
First colours	Second colours

First international
- Montenegro 2–1 Albania (Shkodër, Albania; 2 May 2007)

Biggest win
- Malta 0–6 Montenegro (26 September 2022)

Biggest defeat
- Poland 6–0 Montenegro (10 October 2016)

The Montenegro national under-21 football team is the national under-21 football team of Montenegro and is controlled by the Football Association of Montenegro. The team competes in the UEFA European Under-21 Championship, held every two years.

== Competitive record ==
=== UEFA European Under-21 Championship Record ===
Year	Round	GP	W	D*	L	GS	GA
1994-2006	Part of Serbia and Montenegro						
(Sweden) 2009	Qualifying Stage	8	2	2	4	5	12
(Denmark) 2011	Qualifying Stage	8	4	1	3	9	11
(Israel) 2013	Qualifying Stage	8	3	2	3	14	8
(Czech Republic) 2015	Qualifying Stage	8	3	2	3	12	11
(Poland) 2017	Qualifying Stage	10	4	4	2	13	11
(Italy) 2019	Qualifying Stage	10	3	2	5	15	15
(Hungary) (Slovenia) 2021	Qualifying Stage	10	2	1	7	11	13
(Georgia (country)) (Romania) 2023	Qualifying Stage	10	3	2	5	14	17
(Slovakia) 2025	Qualifying Stage	10	2	1	7	8	19
(Albania) (Serbia) 2027	Qualifying Stage						
Total	0/10	87	27	19	40	106	125

== 2027 UEFA European Under-21 Football Championship qualification ==
Pos	Team	Pld	W	D	L	GF	GA	GD	Pts	Qualification	Italy	Poland	Sweden	Montenegro	North Macedonia	Armenia
1	Italy	10	9	0	1	32	7	+25	27 (Note: Tied on head-to-head points (3). Head-to-head goal difference: Italy +3, Poland −3.)	Final tournament	—	6–2	4–0	2–1	4–0	5–1
2	Poland	10	9	0	1	28	8	+20	27	Final tournament	2–1	—	3–0	2–0	3–0	4–1
3	Sweden	10	4	1	5	12	22	−10	13		0–4	0–6	—	2–2	2–0	3–0
4	Montenegro	10	3	3	4	13	16	−3	12		1–4	0–1	2–0	—	3–2	1–1
5	North Macedonia	10	2	1	7	8	20	−12	7		0–1	0–1	1–4	1–1	—	2–1
6	Armenia	10	0	1	9	5	25	−20	1		0–1	0–4	0–1	1–2	0–2	—

Source: UEFA

== Players ==
=== Current squad ===
The following players were called up for the European championship qualification matches against Armenia and Italy on 14 and 18 November 2025 respectively.

Caps and goals correct as of 14 October 2025, after the match against North Macedonia.

No.	Pos.	Player	Date of birth (age)	Caps	Goals	Club
1	GK	Benjamin Krijestarac	18 February 2005 (age 21)	5	0	(Football Association of Montenegro) Bokelj
22	GK	Balša Radanović	2 May 2007 (age 19)	1	0	(Football Association of Montenegro) Rudar
12	GK	Vasilije Stojanović	15 December 2006 (age 19)	0	0	(Football Association of Montenegro) Mornar
	DF	Velimir Ljutica	1 November 2005 (age 21)	3	0	(Football Association of Montenegro) Mornar
	DF	Stefan Melentijević	20 March 2004 (age 22)	11	0	(Football Association of Slovenia) Primorje
	DF	Milan Roganović	28 October 2005 (age 21)	3	0	(Football Association of Serbia) Partizan
	DF	Damjan Dakić	26 May 2003 (age 23)	9	0	(Football Association of Montenegro) Budućnost
	DF	Marko Franeta	12 December 2004 (age 21)	6	1	(Football Association of Montenegro) Petrovac
	DF	Nikola Vuković	5 December 2004 (age 21)	15	0	(Football Association of Montenegro) Petrovac
	DF	Bojan Damjanović	6 June 2006 (age 20)	5	1	(Football Association of Montenegro) Sutjeska
	DF	Balša Vukotić	27 July 2004 (age 22)	5	0	(Football Association of Serbia) Grafičar
	MF	Nemanja Carević	8 April 2004 (age 22)	4	0	(Football Association of Montenegro) Petrovac
	MF	Dragan Miranović	11 January 2005 (age 21)	8	0	(Football Association of Montenegro) Petrovac
	MF	Kristijan Radunović	8 September 2004 (age 22)	1	0	(Football Association of Montenegro) Bokelj
	MF	Lazar Savović	12 January 2008 (age 18)	2	0	(Football Association of Montenegro) Budućnost
	MF	Danilo Vukanić	11 August 2006 (age 20)	4	1	(Football Association of Montenegro) Budućnost
	MF	Medo Juković	31 December 2004 (age 21)	9	2	(Football Association of Montenegro) Sutjeska
	MF	Nenad Krivokapić	10 June 2002 (age 24)	7	0	(Football Association of Montenegro) Sutjeska
	MF	Lazar Knežević	24 October 2004 (age 22)	7	0	(Football Association of Montenegro) Mladost DG
	FW	Balša Radusinović	3 July 2004 (age 22)	2	0	(Football Association of Montenegro) Dečić
8	FW	Balša Mrvaljević	3 September 2005 (age 21)	10	3	(Football Association of Montenegro) Mladost DG
	FW	Vladimir Perišić	26 August 2004 (age 22)	8	1	(Slovak Football Association) Košice
	FW	Filip Perović	18 July 2006 (age 20)	20	6	(Austrian Football Association) LASK

=== Recent call-ups ===
Pos.	Player	Date of birth (age)	Caps	Goals	Club	Latest call-up

== See also ==
- Montenegro national football team
- Montenegro national under-19 football team
- Montenegro national under-17 football team
