= Andreas Laudrup =

Danish footballer (born 1990)

Personal information
- Full name: Andreas Retz Laudrup
- Date of birth: 10 November 1990 (age 35)
- Place of birth: Barcelona, Spain
- Height: 1.75 m (5 ft 9 in)
- Position: Midfielder

Youth career
- 2003–2005: BSV
- 2005–2007: Lyngby BK
- 2007–2008: Real Madrid
- 2008–2009: Lyngby BK

Senior career*
Years	Team	Apps	(Gls)
2008–2009	Lyngby BK	1	(0)
2009–2014	FC Nordsjælland	77	(8)
2013	→ AS Saint-Étienne (loan)	0	(0)
2014–2015	AGF	12	(0)
Total		90	(8)

International career
2006	Denmark U16	2	(0)
2006	Denmark U17	5	(0)
2007–2008	Denmark U18	3	(0)
2009	Denmark U19	2	(0)
2011	Denmark U20	1	(0)
2010–2012	Denmark U21	14	(3)
- * Club domestic league appearances and goals

Andreas Retz Laudrup (born 10 November 1990) is a Danish football pundit and former professional footballer who played as a midfielder. He is the younger son of former Danish international Michael Laudrup.

After his retirement in 2015, Laudrup worked as a pundit and commentator for TV 2 and as a player agent.

== Club career ==
While at Real Madrid Juvenil B Laudrup was considered one of the most promising players, having gained good reviews by both Real Madrid's Youth Staff and Denmark's Youth coaching staff. In Real Madrid Juvenil B he chose to be called simply by Andreas without his last name.

When his father left Getafe CF and Madrid to become head coach at Spartak Moscow, it was decided that Andreas should return to Denmark to join Lyngby BK. He then later joined Danish Superliga side FC Nordsjælland.

On 10 April 2011 he scored a brace when FC Nordsjælland beat SønderjyskE 2–0. He also scored in his team's final match in the 2011–12 Danish Superliga, helping Nordsjælland clinch their maiden domestic league title.

On 9 January 2013, he moved to Saint-Etienne in France on a 6-month loan deal, with an option to buy.

On 1 July 2014, he signed a one-year deal with Aarhus outfit AGF.

On 4 May 2015 he was forced to retire due to arthritis.

== International career ==
A Danish international since the U-17 level, Laudrup has been capped at every level. In the summer of 2009, he was called up to the U-21 side that took part in the Milk Cup in Northern Ireland. He made his U-21 debut against Mexico on 17 January 2010.

== Post-retirement activity ==
In 2018, it was announced that Laudrup had established a sports agency with lawyer Mads Staberg. The company was among other involved the transfer of Matej Delač from Chelsea to AC Horsens in April 2018.

In 2020, Laudrup signed a contract with TV 2, where he would star as a pundit and commentator for their coverage of La Liga.

== Personal life ==
He and his older half brother Mads Laudrup have followed their father Michael Laudrup into professional football. His uncle is former Danish international Brian Laudrup and his grandfather is former Danish international Finn Laudrup. His cousin Nicolai Laudrup, son of Brian Laudrup, is also a professional footballer with Danish club Lyngby BK U/Squard.

== Honours ==
FC Nordsjælland

- Danish Superliga: 2011–12
- Danish Cup: 2009–10, 2010–11
