= Faroe Islands national under-21 football team =

Faroe Islands U21
- Association: Faroe Islands; Football Association
- Confederation: UEFA (Europe)
- Head coach: Ólavur Mikkelsen
- Most caps: Jóannes Bjartalíð (18)
- Top scorer: Gunnar Zachariasen; Stefan Radosavljevic; Meinhard Olsen (4)
- Home stadium: Tórsvøllur and Svangaskarð
- FIFA code: FRO
First colours	Second colours

First international
- Croatia 2 – 0 Faroe Islands (Varaždin, Croatia; 2 June, 2007)

Biggest win
- Faroe Islands 3 – 1 Andorra (Tórshavn, Faroe Islands; 11 August 2010); Faroe Islands 3 – 1 Georgia (Tórshavn, Faroe Islands; 10 October 2017); Faroe Islands 3 – 1 Israel (Toftir, Faroe Islands; 2 September 2020)

Biggest defeat
- North Macedonia 7 – 1 Faroe Islands (Skopje, 10 September 2019)

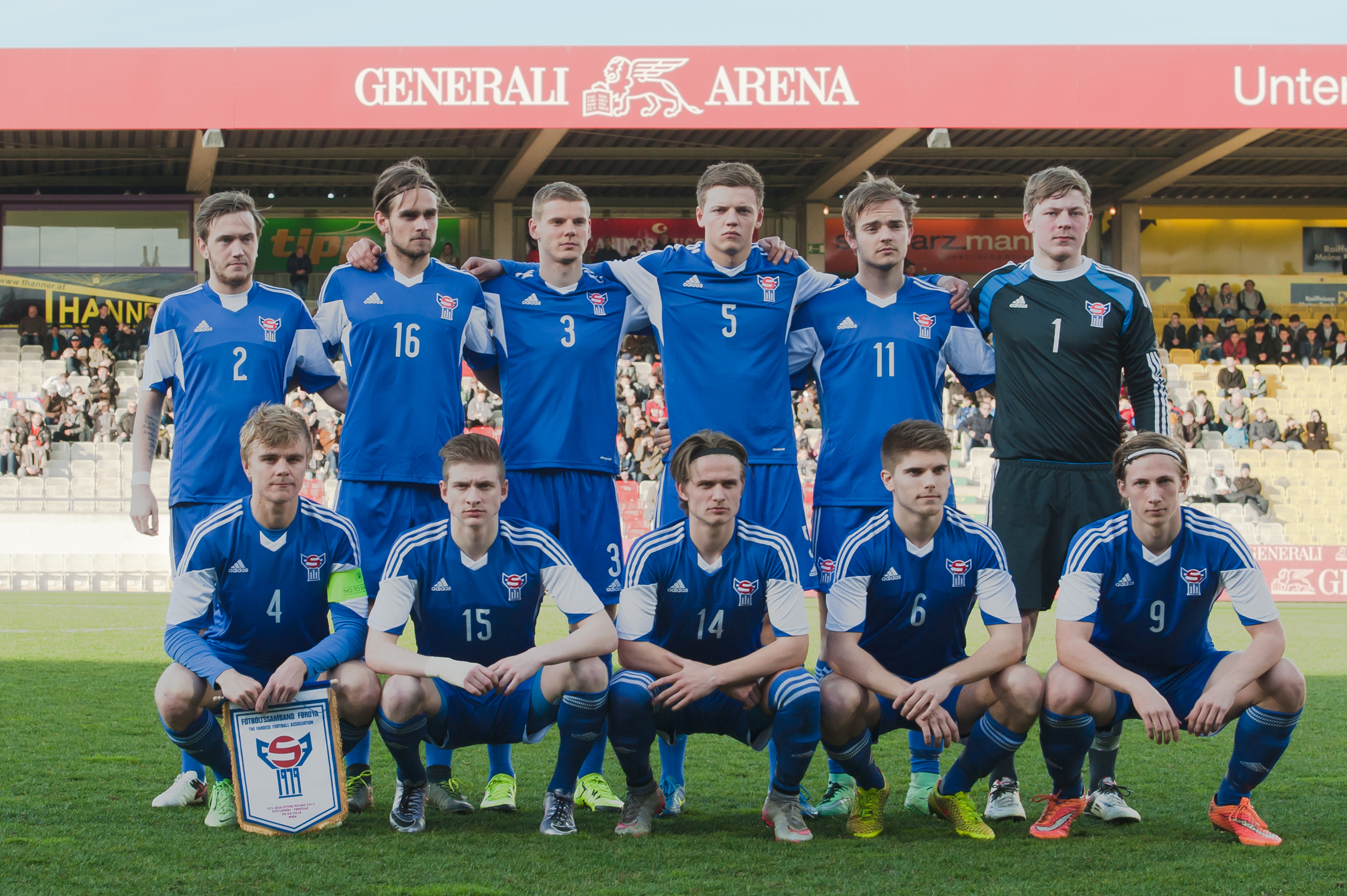
2016

The Faroe Islands national under-21 football team are a feeder team to the Faroe Islands national football team. The Faroe Islands U21 team was first formed in 2006 and took part in UEFA European Under-21 Championship qualifying for the first time in 2007 and 2008. Before this there was no step between the U-19 team and the senior team.

== History ==
In 2006, it was announced that the Faroe Islands will have an under-21 team and will take part in qualification for the UEFA European Under-21 Championship. From then on the Faroe Islands are now represented in all age groups, U-15, U-17, U-19 and U-21 also. In early 2007 the Faroese Football Association appointed two coaches, Heðin Askham and Bill McLeod Jacobsen, both have been coaches for several other Faroese youth national teams. A squad of 34 players was selected for the first training season. A 20-man squad was named for the first two matches against Croatia and Albania in the 2009 UEFA Under-21 Championship qualifying. Faroe Islands lost the first match 2-0, with Croatia scoring their second goal in the last minute. They lost the second match 1-0, Albania scored the only goal of the match in the second half from a penalty kick. Faroe Islands had to wait until their fourth match for the first under-21 victory, it came when they beat Azerbaijan 1-0 in Toftir. Their only other point was also against Azerbaijan, in the away match. Faroe Islands finished the group in 5th place, 1 point above Azerbaijan.

In the 2011 UEFA Under-21 Championship qualifying, on 9 June 2009 Faroe Islands under-21 recorded a famous victory over Russia U21, beating them 1-0 after a goal in the first minute. This was followed by a 1-1 draw against Moldova in September, but Faroe Islands lost the next match 3-1 against Latvia. Russia had their revenge in the away match and defeated Faroe Islands 2-0. They also lost both matches against Romania. In November 2009 Faroe Islands beat Latvia 1-0 and were held to a 1-1 draw against Andorra. Faroe Islands won the home match against Andorra 3-1. Faroe Islands had the chance of finishing third in the group going into the final match against Moldova, in Tiraspol. The score remained 0-0 until Moldova scored a goal with 10 minutes left to play and the Faroe Islands had a player sent off minutes later.

Faroe Islands U21 began the 2013 UEFA Under-21 Championship qualifying with two matches against Northern Ireland. In the first match, with the score at 0-0, the Faroe Islands were awarded a penalty just before injury-time in the second-half. Captain Rógvi Holm missed the spotkick and the chance to give the team victory. In the away match against Northern Ireland, Faroe Islands lost 4-0. This was followed by away defeats to Serbia, Macedonia, and Denmark. The next matches were verses Macedonia and Serbia in June 2012 and were the first matches at home in just over a year for the team. Faroe Islands drew 1-1 with Macedonia, ending a run of four straight defeats, but lost the other match 2-0 to Serbia. The final match of the group for the Faroe Islands was against Denmark, in which the Faroe Islands secured a 1-1 draw after scoring a late equaliser.

In October 2014, the Faroese Football Association (FSF) announced that Heðin Askham did not wish to continue as the coach for the Faroe Islands U21 in 2015, instead he was the new head coach for HB Tórshavn. In January 2015 FSF announced that they had decided to promote the former assisting coach Bill McLeod Jacobsen to be head coach for the team. On 14 January 2015 FSF announced that Eli Hentze was the new assisting coach.

== Results ==
=== 2011 UEFA European Under-21 Championship qualification ===
Team	Pld	W	D	L	GF	GA	GD	Pts	(Romania)	(Russia)	(Moldova)	(Latvia)	(Faroe Islands)	(Andorra)
Romania	10	8	1	1	23	6	+17	25	—	3–0	3–0	4–1	3–0	2–0
Russia	10	7	1	2	22	6	+16	22	0–0	—	3–1	2–1	2–0	4–0
Moldova	10	4	2	4	9	13	−4	14	0–1	0–3	—	1–0	1–0	1–0
Latvia	10	4	1	5	16	15	+1	13	5–1	0–4	1–1	—	0–1	4–0
Faroe Islands	10	3	2	5	8	16	−8	11	0–4	1–0	1–1	1–3	—	3–1
Andorra	10	0	1	9	3	25	−22	1	0–2	0–4	1–3	0–1	1–1	—

Legend: Blue = home team win; Yellow = draw; Red = away team win.

=== 2013 UEFA European Under-21 Championship qualification ===
Pos	Team	Pld	W	D	L	GF	GA	GD	Pts	Qualification	(Serbia)	(Denmark)	(North Macedonia)	(Northern Ireland)	(Faroe Islands)
1	Serbia	8	5	3	0	17	4	+13	18	Play-offs	—	0–0	5–1	1–0	5–1
2	Denmark	8	4	4	0	19	8	+11	16	Play-offs	1–1	—	6–5	3–0	4–0
3	Macedonia	8	3	3	2	14	15	−1	12		1–1	1–1	—	1–0	1–0
4	Northern Ireland	8	1	1	6	5	13	−8	4		0–2	0–3	1–3	—	4–0
5	Faroe Islands	8	0	3	5	3	18	−15	3		0–2	1–1	1–1	0–0	—

=== 2015 UEFA European Under-21 Championship qualification ===
Pos	Team	Pld	W	D	L	GF	GA	GD	Pts	Qualification	Germany	Romania	Montenegro	Ireland	Faroe Islands
1	Germany	8	6	2	0	25	5	+20	20	Play-offs	—	8–0	2–0	2–0	3–2
2	Romania	8	3	3	2	14	19	−5	12		2–2	—	4–3	0–0	3–1
3	Montenegro	8	3	2	3	12	11	+1	11		1–1	3–2	—	0–0	3–0
4	Republic of Ireland	8	2	2	4	10	12	−2	8		0–4	0–1	1–2	—	5–2
5	Faroe Islands	8	1	1	6	9	23	−14	4		0–3	2–2	1–0	1–4	—

Source: UEFA

=== 2017 UEFA European Under-21 Championship qualification ===
Pos	Team	Pld	W	D	L	GF	GA	GD	Pts	Qualification	Germany	Austria	Finland	Azerbaijan	Russia	Faroe Islands
1	Germany	10	10	0	0	35	8	+27	30	Final tournament	—	4–2	4–0	3–1	4–3	4–1
2	Austria	10	7	1	2	22	12	+10	22	Play-offs	1–4	—	2–0	7–0	4–3	1–0
3	Finland	10	4	2	4	13	10	+3	14		0–1	0–1	—	0–0	2–0	3–0
4	Azerbaijan	10	2	3	5	8	19	−11	9		0–3	0–2	0–1	—	3–0	1–1
5	Russia	10	2	3	5	15	19	−4	9		0–2	1–1	1–1	2–2	—	2–0
6	Faroe Islands	10	0	1	9	3	28	−25	1		0–6	0–1	1–6	0–1	0–3	—

Source: UEFA

=== 2019 UEFA European Under-21 Championship qualification ===
Pos	Team	Pld	W	D	L	GF	GA	GD	Pts	Qualification	Denmark	Poland	Georgia	Finland	Lithuania	Faroe Islands
1	Denmark	10	7	2	1	30	8	+22	23	Final tournament	—	1–1	5–2	2–0	6–0	3–0
2	Poland	10	6	4	0	22	9	+13	22	Play-offs	3–1	—	3–0	3–3	1–0	1–1
3	Georgia	10	3	3	4	11	19	−8	12		2–2	0–3	—	2–2	1–0	1–0
4	Finland	10	2	3	5	13	21	−8	9		0–5	1–3	1–2	—	0–2	1–1
5	Lithuania	10	2	2	6	7	16	−9	8		0–2	0–2	0–0	0–2	—	3–0
6	Faroe Islands	10	1	4	5	10	20	−10	7		0–3	2–2	3–1	1–3	2–2	—

Source: UEFA

=== 2021 UEFA European Under-21 Championship qualification ===
Pos	Team	Pld	W	D	L	GF	GA	GD	Pts	Qualification	Spain	North Macedonia	Israel	Kazakhstan	Faroe Islands	Montenegro
1	Spain	10	9	1	0	20	1	+19	28	Final tournament	—	3–0	3–0	3–0	2–0	2–0
2	North Macedonia	10	5	3	2	20	12	+8	18		0–1	—	1–1	1–1	7–1	2–1
3	Israel	10	3	4	3	12	14	−2	13		1–1	1–1	—	1–2	3–1	0–0
4	Kazakhstan	10	3	1	6	12	21	−9	10		0–1	1–4	1–2	—	2–3	0–4
5	Faroe Islands	10	3	0	7	11	25	−14	9		0–2	1–2	3–1	1–3	—	1–0
6	Montenegro	10	2	1	7	11	13	−2	7		0–2	1–2	1–2	1–2	3–0	—

Source: UEFA

=== 2023 UEFA European Under-21 Championship qualification ===
Pos	Team	Pld	W	D	L	GF	GA	GD	Pts	Qualification	France	Ukraine	Serbia	Faroe Islands	North Macedonia	Armenia
1	France	10	8	2	0	31	5	+26	26	Final tournament	—	5–0	2–0	2–0	3–0	7–0
2	Ukraine	10	7	2	1	20	11	+9	23	Play-offs	3–3	—	2–1	1–0	4–0	2–1
3	Serbia	10	3	3	4	10	11	−1	12		0–3	0–1	—	0–0	2–1	2–0
4	Faroe Islands	10	2	4	4	6	12	−6	10		1–1	0–4	1–1	—	1–1	2–0
5	North Macedonia	10	2	3	5	8	15	−7	9		0–1	1–1	0–0	0–1	—	3–1
6	Armenia	10	1	0	9	7	28	−21	3		1–4	0–2	1–4	2–0	1–2	—

Source: UEFA

== Current squad ==
The following players were called up for the 2027 UEFA European Under-21 Championship qualification matches against Estonia on September 25, Luxembourg on September 30, and Iceland on October 6.

Caps and goals updated as of 27 March 2026, after the match against Switzerland.

No.	Pos.	Player	Date of birth (age)	Caps	Goals	Club
	GK	Hans Jákup Arngrímsson	29 March 2004 (age 22)	8	0	(Faroe Islands Football Association) Skála
	GK	Sámal á Steig	2 December 2006 (age 19)	0	0	(Faroe Islands Football Association) 07 Vestur
	DF	Ingi Arngrímsson	17 February 2006 (age 20)	8	0	(Faroe Islands Football Association) Víkingur
	DF	Ejvind Restorff Mouritsen	14 February 2004 (age 22)	10	0	(Faroe Islands Football Association) HB
	DF	Sjúrður Henriksen	31 October 2007 (age 19)	0	0	(Faroe Islands Football Association) AB
	DF	Jákup Vilhelmsen	30 January 2004 (age 22)	10	0	(Faroe Islands Football Association) Víkingur
	DF	Virgar Jónsson	13 June 2006 (age 20)	8	0	(Faroe Islands Football Association) EB/Streymur
	DF	Jónas Prior	24 May 2006 (age 20)	2	0	(Faroe Islands Football Association) 07 Vestur
	DF	Jósef Ólavsson Gleðisheygg	15 November 2007 (age 18)	1	0	(Faroe Islands Football Association) Víkingur
	DF	Bjarti Thorleifsson	28 January 2004 (age 22)	6	0	(Faroe Islands Football Association) Skála
	MF	Arnór Brandsson	3 January 2007 (age 19)	0	0	(Faroe Islands Football Association) Víkingur
	MF	Árni Nóa Atlason	15 January 2006 (age 20)	8	0	(Danish Football Association) Vendsyssel FF
	MF	Heini Sørensen	27 January 2004 (age 22)	19	0	(Faroe Islands Football Association) HB
	MF	Dávid Andreasen	27 June 2004 (age 22)	8	0	(Faroe Islands Football Association) B36
	MF	Hanus Højgaard	3 December 2005 (age 20)	7	0	(Faroe Islands Football Association) B68 Toftir
	MF	Jógvan Gullfoss	25 May 2004 (age 22)	4	0	(Faroe Islands Football Association) B36
	MF	Jón Steingrímsson	12 December 2005 (age 20)	0	0	(Faroe Islands Football Association) AB
	MF	Marjus Nón	11 April 2004 (age 22)	1	0	(Faroe Islands Football Association) B68 Toftir
	FW	Dávid Reynheim	24 January 2008 (age 18)	5	1	(Faroe Islands Football Association) KÍ
	FW	Aron Benjaminsen	2 November 2007 (age 19)	3	0	(Scottish Football Association) Hearts
