= 2015 UEFA European Under-21 Championship qualification Group 2 =

Football tournament qualification stage

The teams competing in Group 2 of the 2015 UEFA European Under-21 Championships qualifying competition were Estonia, Denmark, Andorra, Slovenia, Bulgaria and Russia.

The ten group winners and the four best second-placed teams advanced to the play-offs.

== Standings ==
Pos	Team	Pld	W	D	L	GF	GA	GD	Pts	Qualification	Denmark	Russia	Slovenia	Bulgaria	Estonia	Andorra
1	Denmark	10	8	2	0	37	9	+28	26	Play-offs	—	4–2	2–2	7–1	8–0	6–0
2	Russia	10	7	1	2	22	12	+10	22		0–2	—	2–1	3–1	1–0	5–0
3	Slovenia	10	5	2	3	29	11	+18	17		2–2	0–1	—	2–1	0–1	5–0
4	Bulgaria	10	2	3	5	18	26	−8	9		2–3	3–3	1–5	—	1–1	3–0
5	Estonia	10	2	3	5	9	23	−14	9		0–1	1–2	1–7	2–2	—	1–1
6	Andorra	10	0	1	9	1	35	−34	1		0–2	0–3	0–5	0–3	0–2	—

Source: UEFA
Rules for classification: Tiebreakers

== Results and fixtures ==
All times are CEST (UTC+02:00) during summer and CET (UTC+01:00) during winter.

26 March 2013
16:00

Andorra	0–3	Russia
	Report	Mitrishev 10'; Korotayev 18'; Obukhov 90+3' (pen.)

Estadi Comunal, Andorra la Vella
Referee: Laurent Kopriwa (Luxembourg)

1 June 2013
18:00

Bulgaria	3–0	Andorra
Nedelev 19'; Petkov 45'; Chochev 50'	Report

Lovech Stadium, Lovech
Referee: Johnny Casanova (San Marino)

5 June 2013
17:00

Andorra	0–3	Bulgaria
	Report	Nedelev 45+2' (pen.), 73'; Kirilov 53'

Estadi Comunal, Andorra la Vella
Referee: Rob Rogers (Republic of Ireland)
7 June 2013
16:30

Estonia	0–1	Denmark
	Report	Jradi 54'

Kadriorg Stadium, Tallinn
Referee: Thorvaldur Árnason (Iceland)

11 June 2013
16:30

Estonia	1–1	Andorra
Podholjuzin 35'	Report	L. San Nicolas 52'

Kadriorg Stadium, Tallinn
Referee: Jari Järvinen (Finland)

14 August 2013
20:00

Slovenia	0–1	Estonia
	Report	Rättel 22'

Ob Jezeru City Stadium, Velenje
Referee: Anatolii Zhabchenko (Ukraine)

6 September 2013
15:00

Russia	2–1	Slovenia
Bazelyuk 59', 86'	Report	Vučkić 56'

Arena Khimki, Khimki
Referee: Peter Kráľovič (Slovakia)
6 September 2013
18:00

Bulgaria	1–1	Estonia
Kirilov 20'	Report	Baranov 90+4'

Lovech Stadium, Lovech
Referee: Tornike Gvantseladze (Georgia)
6 September 2013
18:30

Denmark	6–0	Andorra
Remmer 6', 40'; Zohore 20', 34'; Brock-Madsen 89'; Andersen 90+3'	Report

Nordjyske Arena, Aalborg
Referee: Enea Jorgji (Albania)

10 September 2013
15:00

Russia	3–1	Bulgaria
Obukhov 19' (pen.), 48'; Bazelyuk 63'	Report	Kolev 45+4'

Arena Khimki, Khimki
Referee: Andreas Ekberg (Sweden)
10 September 2013
16:30

Slovenia	2–2	Denmark
Vučkić 32'; Šporar 38'	Report	Brock-Madsen 30'; L. Christensen 66'

Ajdovščina Football Stadium, Ajdovščina
Referee: Nikolaj Hänni (Switzerland)

11 October 2013
17:00

Bulgaria	3–3	Russia
Velkov 13'; Chochev 37'; Kolev 66'	Report	Bazelyuk 8', 56'; Kozlov 63'

Beroe Stadium, Stara Zagora
Referee: Sebastian Coltescu (Romania)
11 October 2013
18:00

Denmark	2–2	Slovenia
Højbjerg 46', 74'	Report	Jelenič 17'; Šporar 24'

Nordjyske Arena, Aalborg
Referee: Andreas Pappas (Greece)

15 October 2013
16:30

Russia	0–2	Denmark
	Report	Jønsson 49'; Brock-Madsen 52'

Rodina Stadium, Khimki
Referee: Eitan Shemeulevitch (Israel)
15 October 2013
17:00

Slovenia	2–1	Bulgaria
Georgiev 24' (o.g.); Šporar 90+2'	Report	Jordanov 53'

Nova Gorica Sports Park, Nova Gorica
Referee: Arnold Hunter (Northern Ireland)

15 November 2013
15:30

Slovenia	0–1	Russia
	Report	Nikitin 90+2'

Bonifika Stadium, Koper
Referee: Marius Avram (Romania)
15 November 2013
16:00

Andorra	0–2	Estonia
	Report	Lipin 51'; Kulinitš 60'

Estadi Comunal, Andorra la Vella
Referee: Sergiu Derenov (Moldova)
15 November 2013
17:00

Bulgaria	2–3	Denmark
Jordanov 19'; Gamakov 27'	Report	Poulsen 8', 87'; Vestergaard 53'

Beroe Stadium, Stara Zagora
Referee: Hugo Miguel (Portugal)

19 November 2013
13:30

Bulgaria	1–5	Slovenia
Kolev 28'	Report	Pučko 24'; Jelenič 34'; Benedičič 64'; Bratanović 74', 90+1'

Beroe Stadium, Stara Zagora
Referee: Eli Hacmon (Israel)
19 November 2013
16:00

Andorra	0–2	Denmark
	Report	Zohore 15'; Poulsen 31'

Estadi Comunal, Andorra la Vella
Referee: Aleksandrs Anufrijevs (Latvia)
19 November 2013
17:00

Russia	1–0	Estonia
Nurov 84'	Report

Kuban Stadium, Krasnodar
Referee: Igor Pristovnik (Croatia)

5 March 2014
18:30

Denmark	8–0	Estonia
Højbjerg 12' (pen.), 16'; Cornelius 21'; Poulsen 52'; Thomsen 61', 71'; L. Christensen 67', 84'	Report

Farum Park, Farum
Referee: Sven Bindels (Luxembourg)

30 May 2014
17:00

Andorra	0–5	Slovenia
	Report	Dobrovoljc 27'; Bratanović 39', 53'; Majer 42'; Jelenič 87' (pen.)

Estadi Comunal, Andorra la Vella
Referee: Alexandre Boucaut (Belgium)
31 May 2014
17:00

Estonia	1–2	Russia
Gussev 22'	Report	Mogilevets 6'; Nikitin 20'

A. Le Coq Arena, Tallinn
Referee: Tore Hansen (Norway)

3 September 2014
17:00

Slovenia	5–0	Andorra
Vučkić 18'; Bratanović 55'; Stojanović 60'; Lotrič 82', 88'	Report

Ajdovščina Football Stadium, Ajdovščina
Referee: Eiko Saar (Estonia)
3 September 2014
18:00

Estonia	2–2	Bulgaria
Vihmann 49'; Anier 65' (pen.)	Report	Kolev 8'; Chunchukov 79'

A. Le Coq Arena, Tallinn
Referee: Bryn Markham-Jones (Wales)
3 September 2014
18:00

Denmark	4–2	Russia
L. Christensen 5', 44'; Vestergaard 56'; A. Christensen 73'	Report	Koryan 33'; Davydov 89'

Nordjyske Arena, Aalborg
Referee: Jesús Gil Manzano (Spain)

8 September 2014
16:00

Estonia	1–7	Slovenia
Liivak 83' (pen.)	Report	Mitrović 16'; Šporar 18' (pen.); Vrhovec 27'; Verbič 32'; Krajnc 63'; Hotić 80', 89'

Rakvere linnastaadion, Rakvere
Referee: Lasha Silagava (Georgia)
9 September 2014
18:00

Denmark	7–1	Bulgaria
Andersen 18', 32'; Durmisi 36'; Vestergaard 42'; Berggreen 65'; Bech 67'; Zohore 78'	Report	Karachanakov 49'

Nordjyske Arena, Aalborg
Referee: István Kovács (Romania)
9 September 2014
18:00

Russia	5–0	Andorra
Serderov 2'; Davydov 34', 44'; Khodzhaniyazov 75'; Mogilevets 90+2'	Report

Luzhniki Stadium, Moscow
Referee: Nikola Dabanović (Montenegro)

== Goalscorers ==
5 goals

- (Denmark) Lasse Vigen Christensen
- (Russia) Konstantin Bazelyuk
- (Slovenia) Elvis Bratanović

4 goals

- (Bulgaria) Aleksandar Kolev
- (Denmark) Yussuf Poulsen
- (Denmark) Kenneth Zohore
- (Slovenia) Andraž Šporar

3 goals

- (Bulgaria) Todor Nedelev
- (Denmark) Lucas Andersen
- (Denmark) Nicolai Brock-Madsen
- (Denmark) Pierre-Emile Højbjerg
- (Denmark) Jannik Vestergaard
- (Russia) Denis Davydov
- (Russia) Vladimir Obukhov
- (Slovenia) Enej Jelenič
- (Slovenia) Haris Vučkić

2 goals

- (Bulgaria) Ivaylo Chochev
- (Bulgaria) Edisson Jordanov
- (Bulgaria) Radoslav Kirilov
- (Denmark) Nicolaj Thomsen
- (Denmark) Christoffer Remmer
- (Russia) Pavel Mogilevets
- (Russia) Aleksei Nikitin
- (Slovenia) Dino Hotić

1 goal

- (Andorra) Luigi San Nicolas
- (Bulgaria) Tsvetelin Chunchukov
- (Bulgaria) Milen Gamakov
- (Bulgaria) Anton Karachanakov
- (Bulgaria) Zhivko Petkov
- (Bulgaria) Stefan Velkov
- (Denmark) Uffe Bech
- (Denmark) Emil Berggren
- (Denmark) Andreas Christensen
- (Denmark) Andreas Cornelius
- (Denmark) Riza Durmisi
- (Denmark) Bassel Jradi
- (Denmark) Jens Jønsson
- (Estonia) Hannes Anier
- (Estonia) Nikita Baranov
- (Estonia) Maksim Gussev
- (Estonia) Aleksandr Kulinitš
- (Estonia) Frank Liivak
- (Estonia) Maksim Lipin
- (Estonia) Maksim Podholjuzin
- (Estonia) Artur Rättel
- (Estonia) Madis Vihmann
- (Russia) Dzhamaldin Khodzhaniyazov
- (Russia) Aleksandr Korotayev
- (Russia) Arshak Koryan
- (Russia) Aleksandr Kozlov
- (Russia) Magomed Mitrishev
- (Russia) Georgi Nurov
- (Russia) Serder Serderov
- (Slovenia) Žan Benedičič
- (Slovenia) Gaber Dobrovoljc
- (Slovenia) Luka Krajnc
- (Slovenia) Mitja Lotrič
- (Slovenia) Žan Majer
- (Slovenia) Nemanja Mitrović
- (Slovenia) Matej Pučko
- (Slovenia) Petar Stojanović
- (Slovenia) Benjamin Verbič
- (Slovenia) Blaž Vrhovec

1 own goal

- (Bulgaria) Asen Georgiev (against Slovenia)
