= 2015 UEFA European Under-21 Championship qualification Group 7 =

Football tournament qualification stage

The teams competing in Group 7 of the 2015 UEFA European Under-21 Championships qualifying competition were Sweden, Turkey, Greece, Poland and Malta.

The ten group winners and the four best second-placed teams advanced to the play-offs.

== Standings ==
| Pos | Team | Pld | W | D | L | GF | GA | GD | Pts | Qualification | Sweden | Greece | Poland | Turkey | Malta |
|---|---|---|---|---|---|---|---|---|---|---|---|---|---|---|---|
| 1 | Sweden | 8 | 5 | 1 | 2 | 20 | 14 | +6 | 16 | Play-offs | — | 3–0 | 3–1 | 4–3 | 5–0 |
| 2 | Greece | 8 | 5 | 0 | 3 | 20 | 10 | +10 | 15 | | 5–1 | — | 3–1 | 2–1 | 5–0 |
| 3 | Poland | 8 | 5 | 0 | 3 | 17 | 10 | +7 | 15 | | 2–0 | 3–1 | — | 3–1 | 2–0 |
| 4 | Turkey | 8 | 4 | 1 | 3 | 16 | 11 | +5 | 13 | | 2–2 | 1–0 | 1–0 | — | 4–0 |
| 5 | Malta | 8 | 0 | 0 | 8 | 2 | 30 | −28 | 0 | | 1–2 | 0–4 | 1–5 | 0–3 | — |

Source: UEFA
Rules for classification: Tiebreakers

== Results and fixtures ==
All times are CEST (UTC+02:00) during summer and CET (UTC+01:00) during winter.

6 June 2013
20:45

| Poland | 2–0 | Malta |
|---|---|---|
| Milik 85'; Chrapek 90' | Report |

Marshal Józef Piłsudski Stadium, Kraków
Referee: Alexander Harkam (Austria)

13 August 2013
20:30

| Poland | 3–1 | Turkey |
|---|---|---|
| Pawłowski 8'; Milik 24', 31' | Report | Kocabaş 55' |

Pepsi Arena, Warsaw
Referee: Danilo Grujić (Serbia)

5 September 2013
18:00

| Turkey | 4–0 | Malta |
|---|---|---|
| Şahiner 26', 40'; Koyunlu 44'; Ünal 72' | Report |

Recep Tayyip Erdoğan Stadium, Istanbul
Referee: Sergey Tsinkevich (Belarus)
6 September 2013
18:30

| Sweden | 3–1 | Poland |
|---|---|---|
| Thern 15'; Hrgota 21'; Ishak 56' | Report | Milošević 10' (o.g.) |

Swedbank Stadion, Malmö
Referee: Georgi Kabakov (Bulgaria)

10 September 2013
17:30

| Greece | 5–0 | Malta |
|---|---|---|
| Karelis 5', 13'; Kitsiou 72'; Diamantakos 78'; Gianniotas 90' | Report |

Peristeri Stadium, Athens
Referee: Michael Johansen (Denmark)
10 September 2013
18:00

| Turkey | 2–2 | Sweden |
|---|---|---|
| Çağıran 42'; Koyunlu 87' | Report | Hallberg 31'; Gustafson 90+3' |

Recep Tayyip Erdoğan Stadium, Istanbul
Referee: Javier Estrada (Spain)

The match was abandoned after 21 minutes due to tear gas in the stadium, and was resumed on 19:00, from the point of abandonment.

11 October 2013
18:00

| Turkey | 1–0 | Greece |
|---|---|---|
| Çağıran 11' | Report |

Antalya Atatürk Stadium, Antalya
Referee: Steven McLean (Scotland)
12 October 2013
20:30

| Poland | 2–0 | Sweden |
|---|---|---|
| Furman 33'; Żyro 42' | Report |

Marshal Józef Piłsudski Stadium, Kraków
Referee: Marco Fritz (Germany)

15 October 2013
16:00

| Malta | 0–4 | Greece |
|---|---|---|
| | Report | Potouridis 17' (pen.); Kolovos 45+1', 90'; Diamantakos 90+4' |

Ta' Qali National Stadium, Ta' Qali
Referee: Thoroddur Hjaltalin (Iceland)
15 October 2013
17:30

| Turkey | 1–0 | Poland |
|---|---|---|
| Çağıran 66' | Report |

Antalya Atatürk Stadium, Antalya
Referee: Anthony Taylor (England)

15 November 2013
16:00

| Greece | 5–1 | Sweden |
|---|---|---|
| Diamantakos 4'; Mavrias 19'; Potouridis 44' (pen.); Kolovos 47'; Karelis 88' | Report | Ishak 38' |

Katerini Stadium, Katerini
Referee: Ruddy Buquet (France)
15 November 2013
18:00

| Malta | 1–5 | Poland |
|---|---|---|
| Pisani 90+2' (pen.) | Report | Milik 28', 43', 65'; Chrapek 55'; Pawłowski 60' |

Hibernians Ground, Paola
Referee: Jari Järvinen (Finland)

19 November 2013
17:30

| Poland | 3–1 | Greece |
|---|---|---|
| Milik 61', 79', 90+5' | Report | Karelis 85' |

Marshal Józef Piłsudski Stadium, Kraków
Referee: Vitali Meshkov (Russia)
19 November 2013
18:00

| Sweden | 5–0 | Malta |
|---|---|---|
| Guidetti 11', 27'; Claesson 20'; Hrgota 34'; Nyman 69' | Report |

Swedbank Stadion, Malmö
Referee: Georgi Vadachkoria (Georgia)

5 March 2014
14:30

| Malta | 1–2 | Sweden |
|---|---|---|
| Scicluna 10' | Report | Milošević 29'; Guidetti 70' |

Ta' Qali National Stadium, Ta' Qali
Referee: Enea Jorgji (Albania)
5 March 2014
15:30

| Greece | 2–1 | Turkey |
|---|---|---|
| Karelis 61'; Bouchalakis 89' | Report | Başsan 11' (pen.) |

Katerini Stadium, Katerini
Referee: Artur Dias (Portugal)

5 September 2014
18:00

| Malta | 0–3 | Turkey |
|---|---|---|
| | Report | Başsan 11', 48'; Demir 83' |

Ta' Qali National Stadium, Ta' Qali
Referee: Neil Doyle (Ireland)
5 September 2014
18:00

| Sweden | 3–0 | Greece |
|---|---|---|
| Guidetti 52'; Thelin 73', 90+1' | Report |

Örjans Vall, Halmstad
Referee: Davide Massa (Italy)

9 September 2014
18:30

| Sweden | 4–3 | Turkey |
|---|---|---|
| Olsson 34', 58', 71'; Hiljemark 90+2' | Report | Başsan 29'; Koyunlu 84'; Ünal 86' |

Örjans Vall, Halmstad
Referee: Kevin Clancy (Scotland)
9 September 2014
18:30

| Greece | 3–1 | Poland |
|---|---|---|
| Karelis 12'; Gianniotas 88' (pen.), 90+3' | Report | Przybyłko 24' |

Katerini Stadium, Katerini
Referee: Bastian Dankert (Germany)

== Goalscorers ==
9 goals

- (Poland) Arkadiusz Milik

6 goals

- (Greece) Nikolaos Karelis

4 goals

- (Sweden) John Guidetti
- (Turkey) Emrah Başsan

3 goals

- (Greece) Dimitrios Diamantakos
- (Greece) Giannis Gianniotas
- (Greece) Dimitris Kolovos
- (Sweden) Kristoffer Olsson
- (Turkey) Musa Çağıran
- (Turkey) Kerim Koyunlu

2 goals

- (Greece) Ioannis Potouridis
- (Poland) Michal Chrapek
- (Poland) Bartłomiej Pawłowski
- (Sweden) Branimir Hrgota
- (Sweden) Mikael Ishak
- (Sweden) Isaac Kiese Thelin
- (Turkey) Ömer Ali Şahiner
- (Turkey) Enes Ünal

1 goal

- (Greece) Andreas Bouchalakis
- (Greece) Stelios Kitsiou
- (Greece) Charalampos Mavrias
- (Malta) Stephen Pisani
- (Malta) Ryan Scicluna
- (Poland) Dominik Furman
- (Poland) Kacper Przybyłko
- (Poland) Michał Żyro
- (Sweden) Viktor Claesson
- (Sweden) Simon Gustafson
- (Sweden) Melker Hallberg
- (Sweden) Oscar Hiljemark
- (Sweden) Alexander Milošević
- (Sweden) Christoffer Nyman
- (Sweden) Simon Thern
- (Turkey) Muhammet Demir
- (Turkey) Bertul Kocabaş

1 own goal

- (Sweden) Alexander Milošević (against Poland)
