= 2014–15 in Israeli football =

Football in Israel
- Season: 2014–15

Men's football
- Israeli Premier League: Maccabi Tel Aviv
- Liga Leumit: Bnei Yehuda
- State Cup: Maccabi Tel Aviv
- Toto Cup Al: Maccabi Tel Aviv

The 2014–15 season was the 67th season of competitive football in Israel, and the 89th season under the Israeli Football Association, established in 1928, during the British Mandate.

The season saw Maccabi Tel Aviv winning all three major trophies, the league, the State Cup and the Toto Cup, the first time all three trophies are won by one club during a season.

At the end of the season, Israel hosted the 2015 UEFA Women's Under-19 Championship, the fourth official tournament hosted by Israel (following the 1964 AFC Asian Cup, the 2000 UEFA European Under-16 Championship and the 2013 UEFA European Under-21 Championship), and the first ever women's football tournament was hosted by Israel.

== IFA Competitions ==
=== League Competitions ===
==== Men's senior competitions ====
Competition		Winner	Promotion	Relegated
Israeli Premier League		Maccabi Tel Aviv		Hapoel Petah Tikva; F.C. Ashdod
Liga Leumit		Bnei Yehuda	Hapoel Kfar Saba	Ironi Tiberias; Hakoah Amidar Ramat Gan
Liga Alef	North	Hapoel Katamon Jerusalem		Hapoel Asi Gilboa; Beitar Nahariya; Maccabi Umm al-Fahm
Liga Alef	South	Hapoel Ashkelon		Maccabi Be'er Sheva; Maccabi Kiryat Malakhi
Liga Bet	North A	Hapoel Kafr Kanna		Ahva Arraba; Hapoel Ironi Bnei I'billin
Liga Bet	North B	Hapoel Baqa al-Gharbiyye	Hapoel Iksal	Hapoel Bnei Nujeidat; Hapoel Umm al-Ghanem Nein
Liga Bet	South A	Hapoel Bik'at HaYarden		Maccabi Bnei Jaljulia; Otzma F.C. Holon
Liga Bet	South B	Bnei Eilat		F.C. Bnei Ra'anana; Hapoel Arad
Liga Gimel	Upper Galilee	Beitar Kafr Kanna	Maccabi Bnei Nahf	
Liga Gimel	Lower Galilee	F.C. Tzeirei Kafr Kanna	Ahi Bir al-Maksur	
Liga Gimel	Jezreel	Ihud Bnei Baqa	Hapoel Bnei Zalafa	
Liga Gimel	Samaria	F.C. Haifa Ruby Shapira		
Liga Gimel	Sharon	Hapoel Pardesiya		
Liga Gimel	Tel Aviv	Ironi Beit Dagan		
Liga Gimel	Center	F.C. Holon Yaniv		
Liga Gimel	South	Maccabi Segev Shalom		

==== Women's senior competitions ====
Competition	Winner	Relegated
Ligat Nashim Rishona	ASA Tel Aviv University	Maccabi Tzur Shalom Bialik
Ligat Nashim Shniya	Maccabi Be'er Sheva	

==== Youth competitions ====
Competition		Winner	Runners-up
Noar Premier (U-19)		Maccabi Tel Aviv	Maccabi Haifa
Ne'arim A (U-18)		Maccabi Haifa	Maccabi Tel Aviv
Ne'arim B (U-17)	North	Maccabi Haifa	Maccabi Netanya
Ne'arim B (U-17)	South	Maccabi Tel Aviv	Maccabi Petah Tikva
Ne'arot (women's U-19)		Bnot Sakhnin	ASA Tel Aviv University

=== Cup Competitions ===
Competition		Winner	Runner-up
2014–15 Israel State Cup		Maccabi Tel Aviv	Hapoel Be'er Sheva
Toto Cup	Al	Maccabi Tel Aviv	Maccabi Haifa
Toto Cup	Leumit	Hapoel Bnei Lod	Bnei Yehuda
Israeli Women's Cup		Maccabi Kishronot Hadera	ASA Tel Aviv University
Israel Youth State Cup		Hapoel Tel Aviv	Ironi Kiryat Shmona

== International Club Competitions ==
=== Champions League ===
==== Second qualifying round ====
Team 1	Agg.	Team 2	1st leg	2nd leg
FC Santa Coloma (Andorra)	0–3 (Note: Order of legs reversed after original draw, due to the 2014 Israel–Gaza conflict.)	(Israel) Maccabi Tel Aviv	0–1	0–2

==== Third qualifying round ====
Team 1	Agg.	Team 2	1st leg	2nd leg
Maribor (Slovenia)	3–2	(Israel) Maccabi Tel Aviv	1–0	2–2

=== Europa League ===
==== Second qualifying round ====
Team 1	Agg.	Team 2	1st leg	2nd leg
RNK Split (Croatia)	2–1	(Israel) Hapoel Be'er Sheva	2–1	0–0
Astana (Kazakhstan)	3–1	(Israel) Hapoel Tel Aviv	3–0	0–1

==== Third qualifying round ====
Team 1	Agg.	Team 2	1st leg	2nd leg
Dynamo Moscow (Russia)	3–2	(Israel) Ironi Kiryat Shmona	1–1	2–1

==== Play-off round ====
Team 1	Agg.	Team 2	1st leg	2nd leg
Asteras Tripolis (Greece)	3–3 (a)	(Israel) Maccabi Tel Aviv	2–0	1–3

=== Women's Champions League ===
==== Qualifying round (Group 8) ====
Pos	Team	Pld	W	D	L	GF	GA	GD	Pts	Qualification	OUR	LIE	TEL	CAR
1	(Portugal) Atlético Ouriense (H)	3	2	0	1	4	3	+1	6	Advance to knockout phase	—	—	2–1	—
2	(Belgium) Standard Liège	3	2	0	1	11	1	+10	6		0–1	—	—	10–0
3	(Israel) ASA Tel Aviv	3	1	0	2	3	3	0	3		—	0–1	—	2–0
4	(Wales) Cardiff Met.	3	1	0	2	2	13	−11	3		2–1	—	—	—

Source: UEFA
Rules for classification: Group stage tiebreakers
(H) Hosts

== National teams ==
=== National team ===
==== UEFA Euro 2016 qualifying Group B ====
Pos	Team	Pld	W	D	L	GF	GA	GD	Pts	Qualification
1	Belgium	10	7	2	1	24	5	+19	23	Qualify for final tournament
2	Wales	10	6	3	1	11	4	+7	21	Qualify for final tournament
3	Bosnia and Herzegovina	10	5	2	3	17	12	+5	17	Advance to play-offs
4	Israel	10	4	1	5	16	14	+2	13	
5	Cyprus	10	4	0	6	16	17	−1	12	
6	Andorra	10	0	0	10	4	36	−32	0	

Source: UEFA
Rules for classification: Qualification tiebreakers

==== 2014–15 matches ====
10 October 2014 UEFA Euro 2016 Q	Cyprus	1–2	Israel	Nicosia
21:45 UTC+3	Makrides 67'	Report	Damari 38'; Ben Haim 45'	Stadium: GSP Stadium; Attendance: 19,164; Referee: (Italy) Daniele Orsato

13 October 2014 UEFA Euro 2016 Q	Andorra	1–4	Israel	Andorra la Vella
20:45	Lima 15' (pen.)	Report	Damari 3', 41', 82'; Hemed 90+6' (pen.)	Stadium: Estadi Comunal; Attendance: 800; Referee: (Romania) Cristian Balaj

16 November 2014 UEFA Euro 2016 Q	Israel	3–0	Bosnia and Herzegovina	Haifa
21:45	Vermouth 36'; Damari 45'; Zahavi 70'	Report		Stadium: Sammy Ofer Stadium; Attendance: 30,874; Referee: (Spain) Antonio Mateu Lahoz

28 March 2015 UEFA Euro 2016 Q	Israel	0–3	Wales	Haifa
22:00 UTC+3 (Note: The Israel v Wales match was originally to kick off at 20:45 (22:45 UTC+3), but was moved to 18:00 (20:00 UTC+3) as matches cannot kick off later than 22:00 local time according to UEFA's guidelines.)	Tibi (red card) 51'	Report	Ramsey 45+1'; Bale 50', 77'	Stadium: Sammy Ofer Stadium; Attendance: 30,200; Referee: (Serbia) Milorad Mažić

31 March 2015 UEFA Euro 2016 Q	Israel	0–1	Belgium	Jerusalem
21:45 UTC+3		Report	Fellaini 9'; Kompany (red card) 64'	Stadium: Teddy Stadium; Referee: (England) Mark Clattenburg

12 June 2015 UEFA Euro 2016 Q	Bosnia and Herzegovina	3–1	Israel	Zenica
20:45	Višća 42', 75'; Džeko 45+2' (pen.)	Report	Ben Haim 41'	Stadium: Bilino Polje; Referee: (France) Ruddy Buquet

=== Women's national team ===
==== 2015 Women's World Cup qualification (group 3) ====
Pos	Team	Pld	W	D	L	GF	GA	GD	Pts	Qualification
1	Switzerland	10	9	1	0	53	1	+52	28	Women's World Cup
2	Iceland	10	6	1	3	29	9	+20	19	
3	Denmark	10	5	3	2	25	6	+19	18	
4	Israel	10	4	0	6	9	27	−18	12	
5	Serbia	10	3	1	6	16	34	−18	10	
6	Malta	10	0	0	10	0	55	−55	0	

Source: UEFA
Rules for classification: Tiebreakers

==== 2014–15 matches ====
21 August 2014 2015 WWC Q	Serbia	3–0	Israel	Pećinci
17:00	Smiljković 31', 34'; Bradić 82'	Report		Stadium: Suvača Sportcenter; Attendance: 200; Referee: (Bulgaria) Aneliya Sinabova

13 September 2014 2015 WWC Q	Iceland	3–0	Israel	Reykjavík
19:00	Brynjarsdóttir 2'; Friðriksdóttir 26'; Gunnarsdóttir 90+1'	Report		Stadium: Laugardalsvöllur; Attendance: 622; Referee: (Hungary) Gyöngyi Gaál

17 September 2014 2015 WWC Q	Denmark	0–1	Israel	Vejle
18:00		Report	Falkon 10'	Stadium: Vejle Stadion; Attendance: 657; Referee: (Russia) Anastasia Pustovoitova

=== U-21 National team ===
==== 2015 European U-21 qualifying round (Group 8) ====
Pos	Team	Pld	W	D	L	GF	GA	GD	Pts	Qualification	Portugal	Israel	Norway	Azerbaijan	North Macedonia
1	Portugal	8	8	0	0	22	6	+16	24	Play-offs	—	3–0	5–1	3–1	2–0
2	Israel	8	5	0	3	22	15	+7	15		3–4	—	4–1	7–2	2–1
3	Norway	8	3	0	5	11	19	−8	9		1–2	1–3	—	1–3	2–1
4	Azerbaijan	8	2	1	5	9	15	−6	7		0–2	3–0	0–1	—	0–0
5	Macedonia	8	1	1	6	4	13	−9	4		0–1	0–3	1–3	1–0	—

Source: UEFA
Rules for classification: Tiebreakers

==== 2014–15 matches ====
13 August 2014 2015 U-21 Euro Q	North Macedonia	0–3	Israel	Skopje
20:00		Report	Mizrahi 33', 41'; Gozlan 81'	Stadium: Philip II Arena; Referee: (Estonia) Kristo Tohver

3 September 2014 2015 U-21 Euro Q	Azerbaijan	3–0	Israel	Baku
16:00	Ramazanov 22'; Hajiyev 31', 87'	Report		Stadium: Dalga Arena; Referee: (Latvia) Andris Treimanis

9 September 2014 2015 U-21 Euro Q	Israel	2–1	North Macedonia	Larnaca (Note: The Israel v Macedonia will be played outside Israel due to the 2014 Israel–Gaza conflict.)
17:00	Micha 25'; Dabour 54' (pen.)	Report	Sulejmanov 48'	Stadium: Antonis Papadopoulos; Referee: (Cyprus) Marios Panayi

26 March 2014 Friendly	Cyprus	2–4	Israel	Larnaca
	Kyriajou 37'; Konomis 86'	Report (in Hebrew); Report (in Greek)	altman 4' (pen.), 54'; Jaber 42'; Reichert 82'	Stadium: Antonis Papadopoulos; Referee: (Cyprus) Dimitrios Massias

7 June 2015 2017 U-21 Euro Q	Liechtenstein	0–4	Israel	Vaduz
18:00		Report	Kinda 5'; Altman 49', 62'; Abu Abaid 58'	Stadium: Rheinpark Stadion; Referee: (Georgia (country)) Giorgi Kruashvili

=== U-19 National team ===
==== 2015 UEFA European Under-19 Championship qualification ====
Pos	Team	Pld	W	D	L	GF	GA	GD	Pts	Qualification
1	Ukraine	3	2	1	0	12	3	+9	7	Elite round
2	Sweden	3	2	1	0	8	3	+5	7	Elite round
3	Israel (H)	3	1	0	2	2	7	−5	3	
4	Bulgaria	3	0	0	3	3	12	−9	0	

Source: UEFA
Rules for classification: Qualification tiebreakers
(H) Hosts

==== 2014–15 matches ====
4 September 2014 Tournament Cele	Israel	3–0	Belgium	Subotica
16:30	Inebrum 48', 79'; Hozez 85'	Report (in Hebrew)		Stadium: Stadion na Somborskoj kapiji

5 September 2014 Tournament Cele	Israel	3–0	Hungary	Bačka Topola
16:30	Hozez 52'; Hasidim 76'; Yogev 90'	Report (in Hebrew)		Stadium: Gradski stadion

8 November 2014 Tournament Cele	Serbia	2–1	Israel	Subotica
16:30	Grujić 73'; Gajić 84'	Summary (in Serbian)	Inebrum 31' (pen.)	Stadium: Stadion na Somborskoj kapiji

13 October 2014 Friendly	Israel	0–2	Slovakia	Netanya
17:00		Summary (in Slovak)	Vestenický 44', 84'	Stadium: Beit HaNivcharot; Referee: (Israel) Oren Siminyan

15 October 2014 Friendly	Israel	0–3	Slovakia	Netanya
11:00		Summary (in Slovak)	Čmelík 43'; Bénes 47'; Špalek 53'	Stadium: Beit HaNivcharot; Referee: (Israel) Yigal Frid

12 November 2014 2015 U-19 Euro Q	Israel	2–1	Bulgaria	Netanya
16:00	Inebrum 36'; Hozez 80'	Report	Lyubomirov 30'	Stadium: Netanya Stadium; Referee: (Slovakia) Ján Valášek

14 November 2014 2015 U-19 Euro Q	Israel	0–1	Sweden	Netanya
12:00		Report	Nordin 90+3'	Stadium: Netanya Stadium; Referee: (Slovakia) Ján Valášek

17 November 2014 2015 U-19 Euro Q	Israel	0–5	Ukraine	Netanya
16:00		Report	Besyedin 18'; Arendaruk 27'; Kovalenko 58'; Boryachuk 66'; Zubkov 82'	Stadium: Netanya Stadium; Referee: (England) Anthony Taylor

=== U-19 Women's National team ===
==== 2015 UEFA Women's Under-19 Championship ====
Pos	Team	Pld	W	D	L	GF	GA	GD	Pts	Qualification
1	France	3	3	0	0	6	0	+6	9	Advance to knockout stage 2016 FIFA U-20 Women's World Cup
2	Sweden	3	2	0	1	4	1	+3	6	Advance to knockout stage 2016 FIFA U-20 Women's World Cup
3	Denmark	3	1	0	2	2	3	−1	3	
4	Israel (H)	3	0	0	3	1	9	−8	0	

Source: UEFA
(H) Hosts

==== 2014–15 matches ====
7 March 2015 Kuban Spring	Israel	2–0	Estonia	Sochi
17:00	Metkalov 68'; Awad 80'	Report (in Hebrew)

9 March 2015 Kuban Spring	Israel	6–1	Bulgaria	Sochi
16:10	Avital 40', 41'; Kedem 42'; Awad 53'; Mishel 65'; Dakwar 73'	Report (in Hebrew)	90'

11 March 2015 Kuban Spring	Russia	0–3	Israel	Sochi
13:00		Report (in Hebrew)	Mishel 11'; Avita 53'; Awad 57'

13 March 2015 Kuban Spring (QF)	Israel	1–0	Poland	Sochi
16:00	Avital 58'	(in Hebrew)

15 March 2015 Kuban Spring (SF)	Russia	0–4	Israel	Sochi
16:00	Chernomyrdina 11' (pen.); Andreeva 23'; Shakhova 48'; Belomyttseva 52'	Summary (in Russian)

17 March 2015 Kuban Spring (3/4M)	Israel	2–0	Romania	Sochi
12:30	Avital 36'; Dakwar 76'	Report (in Hebrew)

15 July 2015 2015 W U19 Euro	Israel	0–3	Sweden	Lod
21:15		Report	Björn 22'; Blackstenius 28', 72'	Stadium: Municipal Stadium; Attendance: 2,500; Referee: Rhona Daly (Republic of Ireland)

18 July 2015 2015 W U19 Euro	Israel	0–4	France	Netanya
21:15		Report	Mateo 10'; Carage 26'; Gathrat 63'; Léger 90'	Stadium: Netanya Stadium; Attendance: 2,630; Referee: Lina Lehtovaara (Finland)

21 July 2015 2015 W U19 Euro	Israel	1–2	Denmark	Lod
19:30		Report		Stadium: Municipal Stadium; Attendance: 2,300; Referee: Eleni Lampadariou (Greece)

- In addition to these matches, the national team competed in the Women's League, finishing 5th, with 8 victories, 4 draws and 12 losses, scoring 69 goals and conceding 36 goals.

=== U-17 National team ===
==== 2015 UEFA European Under-17 Championship ====
===== Qualifying round (Group 7) =====
Pos	Team	Pld	W	D	L	GF	GA	GD	Pts	Qualification
1	Croatia	3	2	1	0	10	2	+8	7	Elite round
2	Hungary (H)	3	2	0	1	3	2	+1	6	Elite round
3	Israel	3	1	1	1	6	1	+5	4	Elite round
4	Kazakhstan	3	0	0	3	1	15	−14	0	

Source: UEFA
Rules for classification: Qualification tiebreakers
(H) Hosts

===== Elite round (Group 1) =====
Pos	Team	Pld	W	D	L	GF	GA	GD	Pts	Qualification
1	France	3	2	1	0	9	2	+7	7	Final tournament
2	Spain (H)	3	1	2	0	3	1	+2	5	Final tournament
3	Israel	3	1	1	1	2	1	+1	4	
4	Sweden	3	0	0	3	1	11	−10	0	

Source: UEFA
Rules for classification: Qualification tiebreakers
(H) Hosts

==== 2014–15 matches ====
10 September 2014 Four Nations Tournament	Israel	0–0	Italy	Germany
		Report (in Hebrew)

12 September 2014 Four Nations Tournament	Netherlands	1–0	Israel	Germany
	Konings 10'	Summary(in Dutch)

14 September 2014 Four Nations Tournament	Germany	4–0	Israel	Germany
	Petermann 23'; Schmidt 64', 74'; Eggestein 71'	Summary (in German)

21 October 2014 2015 U-17 Euro Q	Hungary	1–0	Israel	Telki
13:30	At. Szalai 26' (pen.)	Report		Stadium: Globall Football Park; Referee: (Italy) Davide Massa

23 October 2014 2015 U-17 Euro Q	Croatia	0–0	Israel	Tatabánya
13:30		Report		Stadium: Grosics Gyula Stadion; Referee: (Iceland) Gunnar Jarl Jónsson

26 October 2014 2015 U-17 Euro Q	Israel	6–0	Kazakhstan	Tatabánya
13:30	Ronen 9', 33'; Kazimov 18' (o.g.); Cohen 26'; Kataby 64'; Mahamid 70'	Report		Stadium: Grosics Gyula Stadion; Referee: (Iceland) Gunnar Jarl Jónsson

2 March 2015 Friendly	Israel	0–0	Ukraine	Netanya
14:00		Report (in Hebrew)		Stadium: Beit HaNivcharot

4 March 2015 Friendly	Israel	1–0	Ukraine	Netanya
11:00	Altman 21' (pen.)	Report (in Hebrew)		Stadium: Beit HaNivcharot

20 March 2015 2015 U-17 Euro Q	France	1–0	Israel	Benidorm
12:00	Boutobba 46'	Report		Stadium: Estadio Municipal Guillermo Amor; Referee: (Bosnia and Herzegovina) Irfan Peljto

22 March 2015 2015 U-17 Euro Q	Spain	0–0	Israel	Benidorm
18:00		Report		Stadium: Estadio Municipal Guillermo Amor; Referee: (Moldova) Dumitri Muntean

25 March 2015 2015 U-17 Euro Q	Israel	2–0	Sweden	Alcoy
18:00	Cohen 22'; Mahamid 71'	Report		Stadium: Estadio El Collao; Referee: (Bosnia and Herzegovina) Irfan Peljto

=== U-17 Women's national team ===
==== 2015 European U-17 qualifying round (Group 10) ====
Pos	Team	Pld	W	D	L	GF	GA	GD	Pts	Qualification
1	Netherlands	3	2	1	0	7	3	+4	7	Elite round
2	Slovakia	3	2	0	1	4	3	+1	6	Elite round
3	Israel	3	1	0	2	2	4	−2	3	
4	Slovenia (H)	3	0	1	2	3	6	−3	1	

Source: UEFA
Rules for classification: Qualification tiebreakers
(H) Hosts

==== 2014–15 results ====
22 October 2014 2015 W U17 Euro Q	Netherlands	3–0	Israel	Bakovci
15:00	Nouwen 19'; De Beer 30'; Van Velzen 38'	Report		Stadium: ŠRC Bakovci Stadium; Referee: (Scotland) Lorraine Clark

24 October 2014 2015 W U17 Euro Q	Israel	2–0	Slovenia	Bakovci
15:00	Goor 59'; Hazan 67'	Report		Stadium: ŠRC Bakovci Stadium; Referee: Valentina Garoffolo

27 October 2014 2015 W U17 Euro Q	Slovakia	1–0	Israel	Bakovci
14:00	Šurnovská 70' (pen.)	Report		Stadium: ŠRC Bakovci Stadium; Referee: (Azerbaijan) Sabayel Gurbanova
