= 2015 UEFA European Under-21 Championship qualification Group 4 =

Football tournament qualification stage

The teams competing in Group 4 of the 2015 UEFA European Under-21 Championships qualifying competition were Spain, Austria, Hungary, Bosnia and Herzegovina and Albania.

The ten group winners and the four best second-placed teams advanced to the play-offs.

== Standings ==
Pos	Team	Pld	W	D	L	GF	GA	GD	Pts	Qualification	Spain	Austria	Hungary	Bosnia and Herzegovina	Albania
1	Spain	8	7	1	0	24	6	+18	22	Play-offs	—	1–1	1–0	3–2	4–0
2	Austria	8	5	1	2	15	12	+3	16		2–6	—	4–2	2–0	1–3
3	Hungary	8	3	0	5	12	13	−1	9		0–1	0–2	—	4–1	0–2
4	Bosnia and Herzegovina	8	2	0	6	10	22	−12	6		1–6	0–2	1–4	—	4–1
5	Albania	8	2	0	6	7	15	−8	6		0–2	0–1	1–2	0–1	—

Source: UEFA
Rules for classification: Tiebreakers

== Results and fixtures ==
All times are CEST (UTC+02:00) during summer and CET (UTC+01:00) during winter.

7 June 2013
17:30

Albania	1–2	Hungary
Taipi 28' (pen.)	Report	Adorján 30'; Windecker 69'

Niko Dovana Stadium, Durrës
Referee: Jonathan Lardot (Belgium)

11 June 2013
18:00

Bosnia and Herzegovina	4–1	Albania
Mešanović 17', 67'; Čajić 29'; Duljević 90+1'	Report	Hoxha 45+1'

Bilino Polje, Zenica
Referee: Aleksandrs Anufrijevs (Latvia)

14 August 2013
17:30

Albania	0–1	Austria
	Report	Žulj 54'

Flamurtari Stadium, Vlorë
Referee: Sergey Lapochkin (Russia)

5 September 2013
18:00

Hungary	4–1	Bosnia and Herzegovina
Holman 50', 71'; Baráth 59'; Adorján 84' (pen.)	Report	Prcić 8'

Széktói Stadion, Kecskemét
Referee: Anatoliy Abdula (Ukraine)
5 September 2013
20:30

Austria	2–6	Spain
Kainz 20'; Carvajal 83' (o.g.)	Report	Carvajal 3'; Morata 12', 17', 45+4', 86'; Jesé 90+1'

UPC-Arena, Graz
Referee: Nicolas Rainville (France)

9 September 2013
17:00

Bosnia and Herzegovina	0–2	Austria
	Report	Schaub 30'; Stöger 45'

Bilino Polje, Zenica
Referee: Barış Şimşek (Turkey)
9 September 2013
20:30

Spain	4–0	Albania
Muniain 35', 52'; Morata 59'; Jesé 73'	Report

Estadio Las Gaunas, Logroño
Referee: Radu Petrescu (Romania)

10 October 2013
17:00

Hungary	0–2	Austria
	Report	Schaub 13'; Žulj 66'

ETO Park, Győr
Referee: Padraig Sutton (Republic of Ireland)
10 October 2013
20:30

Spain	3–2	Bosnia and Herzegovina
Roberto 29'; Saúl 50'; Morata 69'	Report	Grahovac 13'; Kvesić 86'

Estadio Nueva Condomina, Murcia
Referee: Ivaylo Stoyanov (Bulgaria)

14 October 2013
22:00

Spain	1–0	Hungary
Morata 9'	Report

Estadio Cartagonova, Cartagena
Referee: Miroslav Zelinka (Czech Republic)
15 October 2013
15:00

Albania	0–1	Bosnia and Herzegovina
	Report	Kvesić 38' (pen.)

Ruzhdi Bizhuta Stadium, Elbasan
Referee: Sascha Amhof (Switzerland)

14 November 2013
17:00

Hungary	0–2	Albania
	Report	Shkurti 75'; Shala 83'

Bozsik Stadion, Budapest
Referee: Rahim Hasanov (Azerbaijan)
14 November 2013
20:30

Bosnia and Herzegovina	1–6	Spain
Prcić 15'	Report	Barišić 33' (o.g.); Óliver 44', 65'; Morata 45+4' (pen.); Muniain 61'; Deulofeu 69' (pen.)

Bilino Polje, Zenica
Referee: Jakob Kehlet (Denmark)

18 November 2013
14:00

Albania	0–2	Spain
	Report	Muniain 66'; Deulofeu 88'

Ruzhdi Bizhuta Stadium, Elbasan
Referee: Marios Panayi (Cyprus)
18 November 2013
20:30

Austria	4–2	Hungary
Offenbacher 8'; Žulj 54'; Stöger 67'; Friesenbichler 83'	Report	Radó 18'; Holman 26'

UPC-Arena, Graz
Referee: Vlado Glođović (Serbia)

5 March 2014
18:15

Austria	1–3	Albania
Gregoritsch 90+3' (pen.)	Report	Gavazaj 19'; Shkurti 43'; Shala 57'

UPC-Arena, Graz
Referee: Mervyn Smyth (Northern Ireland)

4 September 2014
16:00

Hungary	0–1	Spain
	Report	Saúl 66'

Pancho Arena, Felcsút
Referee: Orel Grinfeld (Israel)
5 September 2014
20:30

Austria	2–0	Bosnia and Herzegovina
Stöger 11'; Djuricin 33'	Report

NV Arena, Sankt Pölten
Referee: Erik Lambrechts (Belgium)

8 September 2014
17:00

Bosnia and Herzegovina	1–4	Hungary
Zolotić 87'	Report	Vécsei 1'; Kleinheisler 18'; Bacsa 51'; Bese 53'

Asim Ferhatović Hase Stadium, Sarajevo
Referee: Thorvaldur Árnason (Iceland)
9 September 2014
19:00

Spain	1–1	Austria
Sarabia 50'	Report	Gregoritsch 90+5'

Estadio Ciudad de Puertollano, Puertollano
Referee: Stephan Klossner (Switzerland)

== Goalscorers ==
8 goals

- (Spain) Álvaro Morata

4 goals

- (Spain) Iker Muniain

3 goals

- (Austria) Kevin Stöger
- (Austria) Robert Žulj

2 goals

- (Albania) Herolind Shala
- (Albania) Vasil Shkurti
- (Austria) Michael Gregoritsch
- (Austria) Louis Schaub
- (Bosnia and Herzegovina) Mario Kvesić
- (Bosnia and Herzegovina) Jasmin Mešanović
- (Bosnia and Herzegovina) Sanjin Prcić
- (Hungary) Krisztián Adorján
- (Hungary) Dávid Holman
- (Spain) Gerard Deulofeu
- (Spain) Jesé
- (Spain) Óliver
- (Spain) Saúl

1 goal

- (Albania) Enis Gavazaj
- (Albania) Fabio Hoxha
- (Albania) Gjelbrim Taipi
- (Austria) Marco Djuricin
- (Austria) Kevin Friesenbichler
- (Austria) Florian Kainz
- (Austria) Daniel Offenbacher
- (Bosnia and Herzegovina) Aldin Čajić
- (Bosnia and Herzegovina) Haris Duljević
- (Bosnia and Herzegovina) Srđan Grahovac
- (Bosnia and Herzegovina) Nermin Zolotić
- (Hungary) Patrik Bacsa
- (Hungary) Botond Baráth
- (Hungary) Barnabás Bese
- (Hungary) László Kleinheisler
- (Hungary) András Radó
- (Hungary) Bálint Vécsei
- (Hungary) József Windecker
- (Spain) Dani Carvajal
- (Spain) Sergi Roberto
- (Spain) Pablo Sarabia

1 own goal

- (Bosnia and Herzegovina) Tomislav Barišić (against Spain)
- (Spain) Dani Carvajal (against Austria)
