= Stadion Beroe =

Sports venue in Stara Zagora, Bulgaria

- Стадион „Бeрое“
- The Temple
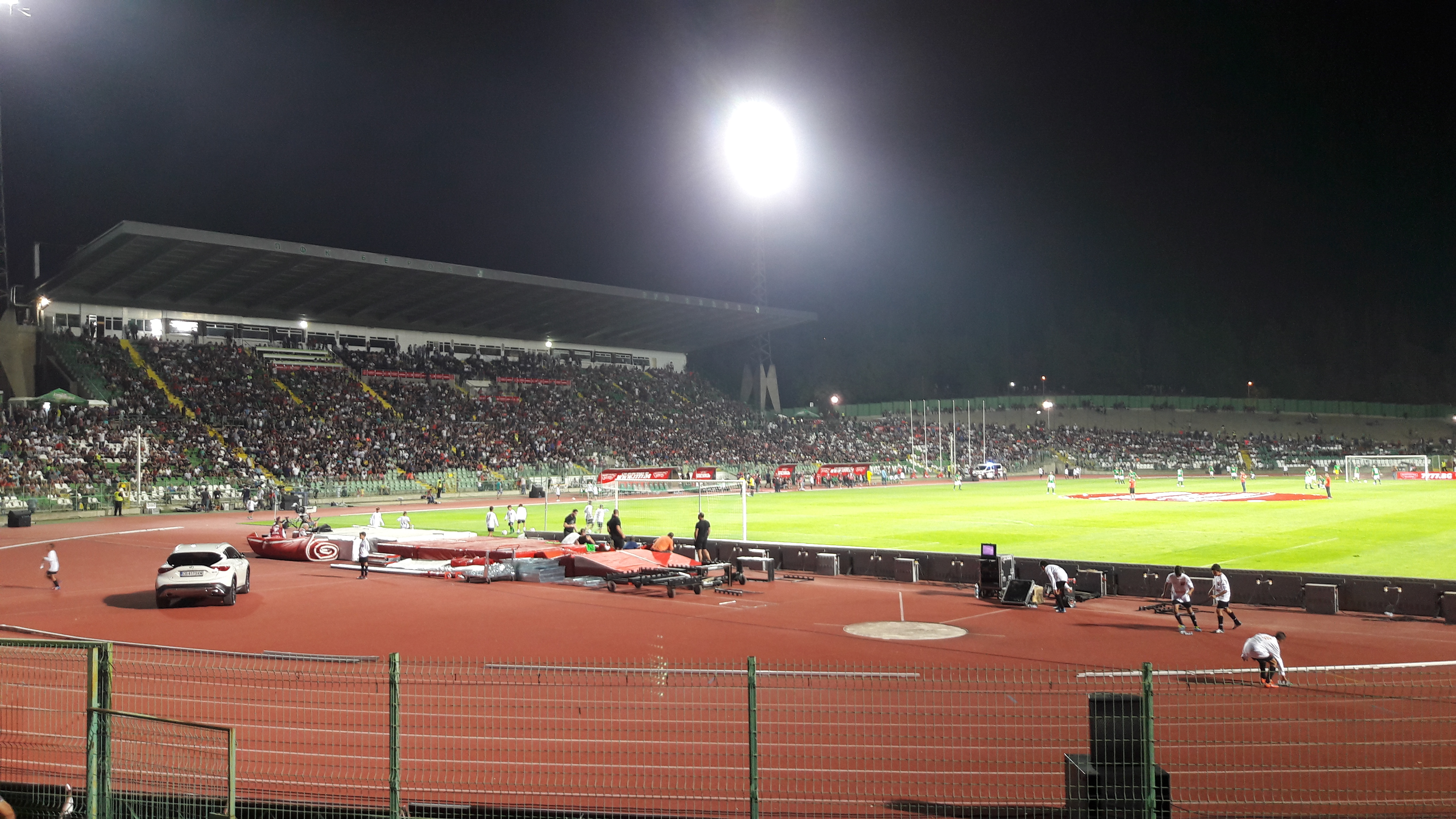
- Interactive map of Stadion Beroe
- Location: Stara Zagora, Bulgaria
- Coordinates: 42°25′58″N 25°36′55″E
- Owner: Stara Zagora municipality
- Operator: PFC Beroe Stara Zagora
- Capacity: 12,128
- Surface: Grass

Construction
- Groundbreaking: 1955
- Built: 1955 - 1959
- Opened: April 4, 1959
- Renovated: 2004, 2007, 2011-2013
- Cost: BGN 2,400,000

Tenant
- PFC Beroe Stara Zagora (1959–present)

Stadion Beroe (Bulgarian: Стадион „Бeрое“, English: 'Beroe Stadium') (also nicknamed The Temple) is a multi-purpose stadium in Stara Zagora, Bulgaria. It is located in the north-western part of the city, near the park Ayazmoto. Currently, the venue is used for football matches and athletic competitions and is also the home ground of the local football club PFC Beroe Stara Zagora. The stadium has a seating capacity of 12,128 spectators and it was officially inaugurated on April 4, 1959.

- The stadium's athletic lane meets all of the IAAF requirements to host international competitions.
- In October 2011, a new floodlight system and a new scoreboard were installed.
- The record attendance of the stadium is 42,000 and it was achieved in an A Group match between Beroe and Levski Sofia in 1972.

== National team matches ==
2013 UEFA Euro U-17 Q

21 October 2012
18:00

Bulgaria	1 – 0	Spain
Ivaylov 40+2'	Report

Beroe Stadium, Stara Zagora
Attendance: 1,500
Referee: Michael Johansen (Denmark)

2015 UEFA Euro U-21 Q

11 October 2013
17:00

Bulgaria	3 – 3	Russia
Velkov 13'; Chochev 37'; Kolev 66'	Report	Bazelyuk 8', 56'; Kozlov 63'

Beroe Stadium, Stara Zagora
Attendance: 1,200
Referee: Sebastian Coltescu (Romania)

2015 UEFA Euro U-21 Q

15 November 2013
17:00

Bulgaria	2 – 3	Denmark
Jordanov 19'; Gamakov 27'	Report	Poulsen 8', 87'; Vestergaard 53'

Beroe Stadium, Stara Zagora
Attendance: 500
Referee: Hugo Miguel (Portugal)

2015 UEFA Euro U-21 Q

19 November 2013
13:30

Bulgaria	1 – 5	Slovenia
Kolev 28'	Report	Pučko 24'; Jelenič 34'; Benedičič 64'; Bratanović 74', 90+1'

Beroe Stadium, Stara Zagora
Attendance: 500
Referee: Eli Hacmon (Israel)

2015 UEFA European Under-17 Championship - OPENING MATCH

6 May 2015
19:00

Bulgaria	0 – 2	Croatia
	Report	Matko Babić 52'; Adrian Blečić 80+3'

Beroe Stadium, Stara Zagora
Attendance: 10,640
Referee: Paweł Raczkowski (Poland)

== See also ==
- List of football stadiums in Bulgaria
