= 2015 UEFA European Under-21 Championship qualification Group 5 =

Football tournament qualification stage

The teams competing in Group 5 of the 2015 UEFA European Under-21 Championships qualifying competition were Switzerland, Ukraine, Croatia, Latvia and Liechtenstein.

The ten group winners and the four best second-placed teams advanced to the play-offs.

== Standings ==
Pos	Team	Pld	W	D	L	GF	GA	GD	Pts	Qualification	Croatia	Ukraine	Switzerland	Latvia	Liechtenstein
1	Croatia	8	6	1	1	20	5	+15	19	Play-offs	—	1–1	0–2	3–1	4–0
2	Ukraine	8	6	1	1	20	8	+12	19	Play-offs	0–2	—	2–0	2–1	3–0
3	Switzerland	8	5	0	3	23	8	+15	15		0–2	1–2	—	7–1	5–1
4	Latvia	8	2	0	6	11	22	−11	6		1–3	1–5	0–2	—	4–0
5	Liechtenstein	8	0	0	8	3	34	−31	0		0–5	2–5	0–6	0–2	—

Source: UEFA
Rules for classification: Tiebreakers

== Results and fixtures ==
All times are CEST (UTC+02:00) during summer and CET (UTC+01:00) during winter.

11 June 2013
17:30

Latvia	4–0	Liechtenstein
Šabala 30', 65'; Rakels 53', 62'	Report

Slokas Stadium, Jurmala
Attendance: 800
Referee: Peter Reinert (Faroe Islands)

13 August 2013
17:00

Liechtenstein	0–5	Croatia
	Report	Brozović 23', 56'; Petković 62'; Mišić 67'; Zimmermann 76' (o.g.)

Rheinpark Stadion, Vaduz
Referee: Mads-Kristoffer Kristoffersen (Denmark)

5 September 2013
16:00

Latvia	0–2	Switzerland
	Report	Kasami 24'; Jevtić 36'

Slokas Stadium, Jurmala
Attendance: 1500
Referee: Christos Nicolaides (Cyprus)

9 September 2013
18:30

Ukraine	0–2	Croatia
	Report	Rebić 16'; Brozović 19'

Arena Lviv, Lviv
Referee: Antonis Giachos (Greece)
9 September 2013
19:00

Liechtenstein	0–6	Switzerland
	Report	Kasami 63'; Brahimi 69'; Veloso 74'; Jevtić 75'; Tabaković 81'; Ben Khalifa 87'

Rheinpark Stadion, Vaduz
Referee: Dumitri Muntean (Moldova)

10 October 2013
18:00

Croatia	4–0	Liechtenstein
Šitum 14', 22'; Brozović 44'; Oršić 65'	Report

Stadion Kranjčevićeva, Zagreb
Referee: Aliyar Aghayev (Azerbaijan)

14 October 2013
14:00

Latvia	1–5	Ukraine
Rei 65'	Report	Ryzhuk 7'; Buyalskyi 27'; Budkivskiy 30', 50', 65'

Zemgale Olympic Center, Jelgava
Attendance: 520
Referee: Svein-Erik Edvartsen (Norway)
14 October 2013
18:30

Switzerland	0–2	Croatia
	Report	Brozović 38', 76'

Cornaredo Stadium, Lugano
Referee: Carlos del Cerro Grande (Spain)

14 November 2013
18:00

Croatia	0–2	Switzerland
	Report	Frey 19'; Jevtić 47'

Stadion Aldo Drosina, Pula
Referee: Serdar Gözübüyük (Netherlands)
15 November 2013
18:30

Liechtenstein	0–2	Latvia
	Report	Savaļnieks 61'; Karašausks 73'

Sportpark Eschen-Mauren, Eschen
Attendance: 274
Referee: Laurent Kopriwa (Luxembourg)

18 November 2013
18:30

Switzerland	1–2	Ukraine
Bertone 86'	Report	Kalitvintsev 8'; Babenko 15'

Arena Thun, Thun
Referee: Jovan Kaluđerović (Montenegro)
19 November 2013
16:00

Croatia	3–1	Latvia
Jedvaj 4'; Brozović 8' (pen.); Perica 33'	Report	Rei 81'

Stadion Aldo Drosina, Pula
Attendance: 850
Referee: Jonathan Lardot (Belgium)

5 March 2014
18:30

Switzerland	5–1	Liechtenstein
Freuler 32'; Kasami 36'; Frey 41'; Widmer 49'; Tabaković 90+1'	Report	Kühne 62'

Arena Thun, Thun
Referee: Sergejus Slyva (Lithuania)

28 May 2014
19:00

Croatia	1–1	Ukraine
Rebić 56'	Report	Malinovskyi 62'

Stadion Kranjčevićeva, Zagreb
Referee: Andreas Ekberg (Sweden)

4 June 2014
16:00

Liechtenstein	2–5	Ukraine
Kühne 36' (pen.), 50'	Report	Noyok 41', 70'; Totovytskyi 44', 90+2'; Yusov 77'

Sportpark Eschen-Mauren, Eschen
Referee: Thoroddur Hjaltalin (Iceland)

8 June 2014
17:00

Ukraine	2–1	Latvia
Kalitvintsev 54'; Totovytskyi 90+5'	Report	Gutkovskis 63'

Tsentralnyi Stadion Cherkasy, Cherkasy
Attendance: 6700
Referee: Marius Avram (Romania)

3 September 2014
16:00

Latvia	1–3	Croatia
Gutkovskis 55'	Report	Bagarić 48'; Rebić 52' (pen.); Župarić 70'

Olympic Sports Center of Zemgale, Jelgava
Attendance: 460
Referee: Peter Kralović (Slovakia)
4 September 2014
17:30

Ukraine	2–0	Switzerland
Ryzhuk 7'; Memeshev 77'	Report

Tsentralnyi Stadion Cherkasy, Cherkasy
Referee: Anthony Taylor (England)

8 September 2014
18:30

Ukraine	3–0	Liechtenstein
Kulach 23', 58'; Zahn 62' (o.g.)	Report

Tsentralnyi Stadion Cherkasy, Cherkasy
Referee: Nerijus Dunauskas (Latvia)
8 September 2014
18:30

Switzerland	7–1	Latvia
Jevtić 5' (pen.), 60' (pen.); Brahimi 14'; Tarashaj 26'; Rodríguez 47'; Tabaković 69', 73'	Report	Klimaševičs 64'

Cornaredo Stadium, Lugano
Attendance: 3154
Referee: Aliyar Aghayev (Azerbaijan)

== Goalscorers ==
7 goals

- (Croatia) Marcelo Brozović

5 goals

- (Switzerland) Darko Jevtić

4 goals

- (Switzerland) Haris Tabaković

3 goals

- (Croatia) Ante Rebić
- (Switzerland) Pajtim Kasami
- (Liechtenstein) Simon Kühne
- (Ukraine) Pylyp Budkivskyi
- (Ukraine) Andriy Totovytskyi

2 goals

- (Croatia) Mario Šitum
- (Latvia) Vladislavs Gutkovskis
- (Latvia) Deniss Rakels
- (Latvia) Igors Denis Rei
- (Latvia) Valerijs Šabala
- (Switzerland) Mërgim Brahimi
- (Switzerland) Michael Frey
- (Ukraine) Oleksandr Noyok
- (Ukraine) Vladyslav Kalytvyntsev
- (Ukraine) Vladyslav Kulach
- (Ukraine) Dmytro Ryzhuk

1 goal

- (Croatia) Dražen Bagarić
- (Croatia) Tin Jedvaj
- (Croatia) Petar Mišić
- (Croatia) Stipe Perica
- (Croatia) Bruno Petković
- (Croatia) Mislav Oršić
- (Croatia) Dario Župarić
- (Latvia) Artūrs Karašausks
- (Latvia) Dmitrijs Klimaševičs
- (Latvia) Roberts Savaļnieks
- (Switzerland) Nassim Ben Khalifa
- (Switzerland) Leonardo Bertone
- (Switzerland) Remo Freuler
- (Switzerland) Francisco Rodríguez
- (Switzerland) Shani Tarashaj
- (Switzerland) Max Veloso
- (Switzerland) Silvan Widmer
- (Ukraine) Ruslan Babenko
- (Ukraine) Vitaliy Buyalskyi
- (Ukraine) Ruslan Malinovskyi
- (Ukraine) Redvan Memeshev
- (Ukraine) Dmytro Yusov

1 own goal

- (Liechtenstein) Simon Zahn (against Ukraine)
- (Liechtenstein) Samuel Zimmermann (against Croatia)
