= 2015 UEFA European Under-21 Championship qualification Group 3 =

Football tournament qualification stage

The teams competing in Group 3 of the 2015 UEFA European Under-21 Championships qualifying competition were Netherlands, Scotland, Slovakia, Georgia and Luxembourg.

The ten group winners and the four best second-placed teams advanced to the play-offs.

== Standings ==
Pos	Team	Pld	W	D	L	GF	GA	GD	Pts	Qualification	Slovakia	Netherlands	Scotland	Georgia	Luxembourg
1	Slovakia	8	5	2	1	19	7	+12	17	Play-offs	—	2–2	1–1	1–0	3–0
2	Netherlands	8	5	1	2	22	6	+16	16	Play-offs	0–1	—	4–0	0–1	3–1
3	Scotland	8	3	2	3	12	15	−3	11		2–1	1–6	—	1–1	3–0
4	Georgia	8	3	1	4	8	15	−7	10		1–3	0–6	2–1	—	0–3 (Note: Match originally ended as a 1–1 draw, but UEFA later awarded the match as a 3–0 forfeit win to Luxembourg.)
5	Luxembourg	8	1	0	7	5	23	−18	3		1–7	0–1	0–3	0–3	—

Source: UEFA
Rules for classification: Tiebreakers

== Results and fixtures ==
All times are CEST (UTC+02:00) during summer and CET (UTC+01:00) during winter.

25 March 2013
20:30

Scotland	3–0	Luxembourg
Walker 45+2'; Watt 66'; Toshney 84'	Report

St Mirren Park, Paisley
Referee: Dennis Antamo (Finland)

11 June 2013
19:00

Luxembourg	1–7	Slovakia
Luisi 55'	Report	Schranz 2', 15', 39'; Paur 19'; Škvarka 29' (pen.); Hrošovský 61'; Janec 73'

Stade Am Deich, Ettelbruck
Referee: Bardhyl Pashaj (Albania)

5 September 2013
18:00

Luxembourg	0–3	Georgia
	Report	Skhirtladze 18'; Kobakhidze 72'; Chanturia 78'

Stade de la Frontière, Esch-sur-Alzette
Referee: Bryn Markham-Jones (Wales)
5 September 2013
18:30

Netherlands	4–0	Scotland
Vilhena 52'; Castaignos 69'; Van der Hoorn 74'; Drost 78'	Report

Stadion de Goffert, Nijmegen
Referee: Paolo Valeri (Italy)

9 September 2013
18:00

Luxembourg	0–1	Netherlands
	Report	Van Ginkel 18' (pen.)

Stade Jos Nosbaum, Dudelange
Referee: Andris Treimanis (Latvia)
9 September 2013
19:00

Slovakia	1–0	Georgia
Zreľák 18'	Report

NTC Senec, Senec
Referee: Alan Mario Sant (Malta)

10 October 2013
16:00

Georgia	0–6	Netherlands
	Report	Boëtius 14'; Castaignos 45+1', 48', 78'; Promes 67', 71'

Mikheil Meskhi Stadium, Tbilisi
Referee: Paweł Raczkowski (Poland)
10 October 2013
20:30

Scotland	2–1	Slovakia
Armstrong 31'; May 36'	Report	Malec 69'

St Mirren Park, Paisley
Referee: Damir Batinić (Croatia)

14 October 2013
13:00

Georgia	2–1	Scotland
Kazaishvili 39'; Jigauri 70'	Report	Macleod 81'

Mikheil Meskhi Stadium, Tbilisi
Referee: Sergey Tsinkevich (Belarus)
14 October 2013
19:00

Slovakia	3–0	Luxembourg
Duda 60' (pen.); Zreľák 77'; Pauschek 87'	Report

NTC Senec, Senec
Referee: Robert Rogers (Republic of Ireland)

14 November 2013
20:15

Slovakia	2–2	Netherlands
Zreľák 37'; Malec 76'	Report	Castaignos 52'; Vilhena 67' (pen.)

NTC Senec, Senec
Referee: Ken Henry Johnsen (Norway)
14 November 2013
20:30

Scotland	1–1	Georgia
Paterson 84'	Report	Chanturia 35'

St Mirren Park, Paisley
Referee: Alain Bieri (Switzerland)

18 November 2013
11:00

Georgia	1–3	Slovakia
Kazaishvili 21'	Report	Mészáros 25'; Duda 61'; Schranz 90+3'

Tengiz Burjanadze Stadium, Gori
Referee: Nikola Popov (Bulgaria)

5 March 2014
11:00

Georgia	0–3 (awarded)	Luxembourg
Jigauri 39'	Report	Lascak 13'

Tengiz Burjanadze Stadium, Gori
Referee: Anatoliy Vishnichenko (Kazakhstan)

28 May 2014
20:45

Scotland	1–6	Netherlands
May 85'	Report	Promes 26', 40', 42'; Rekik 50'; Ziyech 76', 79'

St Mirren Park, Paisley
Referee: Christian Dingert (Germany)

3 June 2014
19:00

Netherlands	3–1	Luxembourg
Castaignos 54'; Promes 56', 61'	Report	Borges 59'

De Geusselt, Maastricht
Referee: Johnny Casanova (San Marino)

4 September 2014
18:30

Netherlands	0–1	Georgia
	Report	Jigauri 71'

De Adelaarshorst, Deventer
Referee: Markus Hameter (Austria)
4 September 2014
20:30

Slovakia	1–1	Scotland
Duda 90'	Report	Fraser 67'

NTC Senec, Senec
Referee: Anatolii Zhabchenko (Ukraine)

8 September 2014
17:00

Luxembourg	0–3	Scotland
	Report	Gauld 32', 63'; McLeod 36'

Stade Municipal de Differdange, Differdange
Referee: Dejan Jakimovski (Macedonia)
8 September 2014
18:30

Netherlands	0–1	Slovakia
	Report	Zreľák 72'

Koning Willem II Stadion, Tilburg
Referee: Javier Estrada (Spain)

== Goalscorers ==
7 goals

- (Netherlands) Quincy Promes

6 goals

- (Netherlands) Luc Castaignos

4 goals

- (Slovakia) Ivan Schranz
- (Slovakia) Adam Zreľák

3 goals

- (Slovakia) Ondrej Duda

2 goals

- (Georgia (country)) Giorgi Chanturia
- (Georgia (country)) Jambul Jigauri
- (Georgia (country)) Valeri Kazaishvili
- (Netherlands) Tonny Vilhena
- (Netherlands) Hakim Ziyech
- (Slovakia) Tomáš Malec
- (Scotland) Ryan Gauld
- (Scotland) Stevie May
- (Scotland) Lewis Macleod

1 goal

- (Georgia (country)) Mamuka Kobakhidze
- (Georgia (country)) Davit Skhirtladze
- (Luxembourg) Antonio Luisi
- (Luxembourg) Clenn Borges
- (Netherlands) Jean-Paul Boëtius
- (Netherlands) Jesper Drost
- (Netherlands) Karim Rekik
- (Netherlands) Marco van Ginkel
- (Netherlands) Mike van der Hoorn
- (Scotland) Stuart Armstrong
- (Scotland) Ryan Fraser
- (Scotland) Callum Paterson
- (Scotland) Lewis Toshney
- (Scotland) Jamie Walker
- (Scotland) Tony Watt
- (Slovakia) Patrik Hrošovský
- (Slovakia) Michal Janec
- (Slovakia) Karol Mészáros
- (Slovakia) Jakub Paur
- (Slovakia) Lukáš Pauschek
- (Slovakia) Michal Škvarka
