= 2015 UEFA European Under-21 Championship qualification Group 10 =

Football tournament qualification stage

The teams competing in Group 10 of the 2015 UEFA European Under-21 Championships qualifying competition are France, Belarus, Armenia, Iceland and Kazakhstan.

The ten group winners and the four best second-placed teams advanced to the play-offs.

== Standings ==
Pos	Team	Pld	W	D	L	GF	GA	GD	Pts	Qualification	France	Iceland	Kazakhstan	Armenia	Belarus
1	France	8	7	1	0	28	7	+21	22	Play-offs	—	1–1	5–0	6–0	1–0
2	Iceland	8	5	1	2	20	11	+9	16	Play-offs	3–4	—	2–0	4–0	4–1
3	Kazakhstan	8	3	0	5	8	18	−10	9		1–5	3–2	—	0–1	1–2
4	Armenia	8	3	0	5	7	19	−12	9		1–4	1–2	1–2	—	2–1
5	Belarus	8	1	0	7	6	14	−8	3		1–2	1–2	0–1	0–1	—

Source: UEFA
Rules for classification: Tiebreakers

== Results and fixtures ==
All times are CEST (UTC+02:00) during summer and CET (UTC+01:00) during winter.

26 March 2013
14:00

Belarus	1–2	Iceland
Kavalewski 73' (pen.)	Report	Böðvarsson 4'; Atlason 51'

Torpedo Stadium, Zhodino
Attendance: 3,500
Referee: Stephan Klossner (Switzerland)

6 June 2013
17:00

Armenia	1–2	Iceland
Sardaryan 67'	Report	Atlason 43', 90'

Hrazdan Stadium, Yerevan
Attendance: 3,000
Referee: Jovan Kaluđerović (Montenegro)
11 June 2013
17:00

Belarus	0–1	Kazakhstan
	Report	Islamkhan 55' (pen.)

City Stadium, Borisov
Attendance: 2,600
Referee: Vasilis Dimitriou (Cyprus)

11 August 2013
15:00

Kazakhstan	0–1	Armenia
	Report	Poghosyan 4'

Astana Arena, Astana
Attendance: 9,500
Referee: Vladimir Vnuk (Slovakia)
14 August 2013
19:00

Iceland	4–1	Belarus
Atlason 7', 37', 71'; Böðvarsson 35'	Report	Kavalyow 56'

Hlíðarendi, Reykjavík
Attendance: 562
Referee: Mitja Žganec (Slovenia)

5 September 2013
20:50

France	5–0	Kazakhstan
Ferri 10'; Ntep de Madiba 13'; Martial 17'; Landre 57'; Benzia 60'	Report

Stade Michel d'Ornano, Caen
Attendance: 13,703
Referee: Sergėjus Slyva (Lithuania)

9 September 2013
20:30

Belarus	1–2	France
Saroka 2'	Report	Ntep de Madiba 65' (pen.), 75'

City Stadium, Borisov
Attendance: 1,200
Referee: Ognjen Valjić (Bosnia and Herzegovina)
10 September 2013
18:00

Iceland	2–0	Kazakhstan
Traustason 57'; Atlason 85'	Report

Kópavogsvöllur, Kópavogur
Attendance: 300
Referee: Mervyn Smyth (Northern Ireland)

10 October 2013
16:00

Kazakhstan	1–2	Belarus
Islamkhan 32'	Report	Savitskiy 13'; Valadzko 35'

Almaty Central Stadium, Almaty
Attendance: 3,000
Referee: Lasha Silagava (Georgia)
10 October 2013
19:00

Armenia	1–4	France
Hakobyan 84'	Report	Benzia 12'; Thauvin 53', 64'; Ntep de Madiba 62'

Hrazdan Stadium, Yerevan
Attendance: 2,000
Referee: Alexander Harkam (Austria)

14 October 2013
16:00

Armenia	1–2	Kazakhstan
Hakobyan 48'	Report	Murtazayev 31'; Beisebekov 72'

Republican Stadium, Yerevan
Attendance: 1,000
Referee: Chris Reisch (Luxembourg)
14 October 2013
20:30

Iceland	3–4	France
Ingason 9'; Rose 57' (o.g.); Friðjónsson 76' (pen.)	Report	Rose 41'; Benzia 67', 69'; Ntep de Madiba 83' (pen.)

Laugardalsvöllur, Reykjavík
Attendance: 1,100
Referee: Martin Strömbergsson (Sweden)

14 November 2013
20:50

France	6–0	Armenia
Martial 27'; Landre 31'; Thauvin 41', 55', 71' (pen.); Haller 87'	Report

Stade Ernest-Wallon, Toulouse
Attendance: 4,250
Referee: Yaroslav Kozyk (Ukraine)

19 November 2013
17:00

Belarus	0–1	Armenia
	Report	Bakalyan 8'

City Stadium, Borisov
Attendance: 500
Referee: Bardhyl Pashaj (Albania)

4 March 2014
20:50

France	1–0	Belarus
Zouma 90+2'	Report

MMArena, Le Mans
Attendance: 10,000
Referee: Dumitri Muntean (Moldova)
5 March 2014
14:00

Kazakhstan	3–2	Iceland
Lunin 7'; Murtazayev 12'; Kuat 89'	Report	Friðjónsson 60'; Hermannsson 67'

Astana Arena, Astana
Attendance: 1,500
Referee: Domagoj Vučkov (Croatia)

3 September 2014
18:30

Iceland	4–0	Armenia
Friðjónsson 24', 57' (pen.); Atlason 68'; Finsen 90'	Report

Fylkisvöllur, Reykjavík
Attendance: 250
Referee: Jakob Kehlet (Denmark)
4 September 2014
16:15

Kazakhstan	1–5	France
Murtazayev 36'	Report	Sanson 17'; Kurzawa 31', 42'; Sanogo 50', 53'

Astana Arena, Astana
Attendance: 5,200
Referee: Tamás Bognár (Hungary)

8 September 2014
21:00

France	1–1	Iceland
Sanogo 63'	Report	Emilsson 80'

Stade de l'Abbé-Deschamps, Auxerre
Attendance: 6,511
Referee: Sergey Lapochkin (Russia)
9 September 2014
18:00

Armenia	2–1	Belarus
Papikyan 61'; Hakobyan 90'	Report	Saroka 71'

Hrazdan Stadium, Yerevan
Attendance: 300
Referee: Fran Jović (Croatia)

== Goalscorers ==
8 goals

- (Iceland) Emil Atlason

5 goals

- (France) Paul-Georges Ntep de Madiba
- (France) Florian Thauvin

4 goals

- (France) Yassine Benzia
- (Iceland) Hólmbert Friðjónsson

3 goals

- (Armenia) Davit Hakobyan
- (France) Yaya Sanogo
- (Kazakhstan) Roman Murtazayev

2 goals

- (Belarus) Anton Saroka
- (France) Layvin Kurzawa
- (France) Loïck Landre
- (France) Anthony Martial
- (Iceland) Jón Daði Böðvarsson
- (Kazakhstan) Baurzhan Islamkhan

1 goal

- (Armenia) Vardan Bakalyan
- (Armenia) Aghvan Papikyan
- (Armenia) Gagik Poghosyan
- (Armenia) Ashot Sardaryan
- (Belarus) Dzyanis Kavalewski
- (Belarus) Yury Kavalyow
- (Belarus) Pavel Savitskiy
- (Belarus) Maksim Valadzko
- (France) Jordan Ferri
- (France) Sébastien Haller
- (France) Lindsay Rose
- (France) Morgan Sanson
- (France) Kurt Zouma
- (Iceland) Ólafur Karl Finsen
- (Iceland) Kristján Emilsson
- (Iceland) Sverrir Ingi Ingason
- (Iceland) Hjörtur Hermannsson
- (Iceland) Arnór Ingvi Traustason
- (Kazakhstan) Abzal Beisebekov
- (Kazakhstan) Islambek Kuat
- (Kazakhstan) Stanislav Lunin

1 own goal

- (France) Lindsay Rose (playing against Iceland)
