= 2015 UEFA European Under-21 Championship qualification Group 9 =

Football tournament qualification stage

The teams competing in Group 9 of the 2015 UEFA European Under-21 Championships qualifying competition were Italy, Serbia, Belgium, Cyprus and Northern Ireland.

The ten group winners and the four best second-placed teams advanced to the play-offs.

== Standings ==
Pos	Team	Pld	W	D	L	GF	GA	GD	Pts	Qualification	Italy	Serbia	Belgium	Cyprus	
1	Italy	8	6	0	2	19	7	+12	18	Play-offs	—	3–2	1–3	7–1	3–0
2	Serbia	8	5	1	2	18	10	+8	16	Play-offs	1–0	—	2–2	2–1	3–1
3	Belgium	8	5	1	2	15	7	+8	16		0–1	0–3	—	2–0	1–0
4	Cyprus	8	2	0	6	7	21	−14	6		0–2	2–1	0–6	—	3–0
5	Northern Ireland	8	1	0	7	3	17	−14	3		0–2	1–4	0–1	1–0	—

Source: UEFA
Rules for classification: Tiebreakers

== Results and fixtures ==
All times are CEST (UTC+02:00) during summer and CET (UTC+01:00) during winter.

25 March 2013
20:00

Belgium	2–0	Cyprus
M'Poku 3'; Lestienne 53' (pen.)	Report

Den Dreef, Leuven
Referee: Markus Hameter (Austria)

30 May 2013
17:00

Cyprus	3–0	Northern Ireland
Roushias 19'; Theodorou 59'; Sotiriou 69'	Report

Makario Stadium, Nicosia
Referee: Michael Tykgaard (Denmark)

5 September 2013
20:00

Serbia	2–1	Cyprus
Milunović 41', 47'	Report	Kyriacou 65'

Metalac Stadium, Gornji Milanovac
Referee: Sándor Andó-Szabó (Hungary)
5 September 2013
21:00

Italy	1–3	Belgium
Battocchio 39'	Report	Hazard 47'; Malanda 52'; Carrasco 90+2'

Stadio Centro d'Italia – Manlio Scopigno, Rieti
Referee: Daniel Stefański (Poland)

9 September 2013
15:00

Cyprus	0–2	Italy
	Report	Fedato 67'; Improta 90+3'

Makario Stadium, Nicosia
Referee: Orel Greenfeld (Israel)
9 September 2013
20:00

Belgium	1–0	Northern Ireland
Batshuayi 43'	Report

Den Dreef, Leuven
Referee: Aleksandr Gauzer (Kazakhstan)

11 October 2013
16:00

Northern Ireland	0–1	Belgium
	Report	Batshuayi 44'

Mourneview Park, Lurgan
Referee: Ján Valášek (Slovakia)
11 October 2013
19:00

Cyprus	2–1	Serbia
Froxylias 54' (pen.); Thalassitis 71'	Report	Mitrović 84' (pen.)

Dasaki Stadium, Achna
Referee: Kristo Tohver (Estonia)

14 October 2013
20:30

Belgium	0–1	Italy
	Report	Battocchio 4'

Cristal Arena, Genk
Referee: Artur Dias (Portugal)
15 October 2013
18:00

Serbia	3–1	Northern Ireland
Morgan 63' (o.g.); Milunović 64'; Vitas 74'	Report	Gray 54'

Metalac Stadium, Gornji Milanovac
Referee: Oliver Drachta (Austria)

14 November 2013
21:00

Italy	3–0	Northern Ireland
Viviani 26'; Rozzi 86'; Belotti 88'	Report

Mapei Stadium – Città del Tricolore, Reggio Emilia
Referee: Mitja Žganec (Slovenia)
15 November 2013
17:00

Serbia	2–2	Belgium
Đurđević 4'; Mitrović 85'	Report	M'Poku 77'; Ngawa 90+4'

Metalac Stadium, Gornji Milanovac
Referee: Ilias Spathas (Greece)

19 November 2013
17:00

Serbia	1–0	Italy
Čaušić 60'	Report

Metalac Stadium, Gornji Milanovac
Referee: Halis Özkahya (Turkey)
19 November 2013
20:30

Northern Ireland	1–0	Cyprus
Gorman 85'	Report

Mourneview Park, Lurgan
Referee: Suren Baliyan (Armenia)

5 March 2014
17:00

Northern Ireland	0–2	Italy
	Report	Rugani 59'; Trotta 89'

Mourneview Park, Lurgan
Referee: Georgi Kabakov (Bulgaria)
5 March 2014
18:00

Belgium	0–3	Serbia
	Report	Mitrović 11', 56'; Brašanac 53'

Den Dreef, Leuven
Referee: Felix Zwayer (Germany)

5 September 2014
17:00

Cyprus	0–6	Belgium
	Report	Tielemans 13'; Denayer 57'; M'Poku 63'; Batshuayi 74', 83'; Kabasele 90+2'

Ammochostos Stadium, Larnaca
Referee: Artyom Kuchin (Kazakhstan)
5 September 2014
21:00

Italy	3–2	Serbia
Belotti 23', 45+4' (pen.); Berardi 75'	Report	Pešić 8', 13'

Stadio Adriatico - Giovanni Cornacchia, Pescara
Referee: Serdar Gözübüyük (Netherlands)

9 September 2014
17:00

Northern Ireland	1–4	Serbia
Brobbel 67'	Report	Pešić 34'; Srnić 36', 56'; Kostić 58'

Shamrock Park, Portadown
Referee: Hugo Miguel (Portugal)
9 September 2014
17:00

Italy	7–1	Cyprus
Bernardeschi 42'; Panayiotou 45+2' (o.g.); Sturaro 56'; Belotti 62'; Dezi 70'; Longo 76'; Rugani 80'	Report	Sotiriou 29'

Stadio Teofilo Patini, Castel di Sangro
Referee: Sascha Amhof (Switzerland)

== Goalscorers ==
4 goals

- (Belgium) Michy Batshuayi
- (Italy) Andrea Belotti
- (Serbia) Aleksandar Mitrović

3 goals

- (Belgium) Paul-José M'Poku
- (Serbia) Luka Milunović
- (Serbia) Aleksandar Pešić

2 goals

- (Cyprus) Pieros Sotiriou
- (Italy) Cristian Battocchio
- (Italy) Daniele Rugani
- (Serbia) Slavoljub Srnić

1 goal

- (Belgium) Jason Denayer
- (Belgium) Yannick Carrasco
- (Belgium) Thorgan Hazard
- (Belgium) Nathan Kabasele
- (Belgium) Maxime Lestienne
- (Belgium) Junior Malanda
- (Belgium) Pierre-Yves Ngawa
- (Belgium) Youri Tielemans
- (Cyprus) Dimitris Froxylias
- (Cyprus) Andreas Kyriakou
- (Cyprus) Onisiforos Roushias
- (Cyprus) Michael Thalassitis
- (Cyprus) Zacharias Theodorou
- (Italy) Domenico Berardi
- (Italy) Federico Bernardeschi
- (Italy) Jacopo Dezi
- (Italy) Francesco Fedato
- (Italy) Riccardo Improta
- (Italy) Samuele Longo
- (Italy) Antonio Rozzi
- (Italy) Stefano Sturaro
- (Italy) Marcello Trotta
- (Italy) Federico Viviani
- (Northern Ireland) Ryan Brobbel
- (Northern Ireland) Johnny Gorman
- (Northern Ireland) James Gray
- (Serbia) Darko Brašanac
- (Serbia) Goran Čaušić
- (Serbia) Uroš Đurđević
- (Serbia) Filip Kostić
- (Serbia) Uroš Vitas

1 own goal

- (Cyprus) Emilios Panayiotou (against Italy)
- (Northern Ireland) David Morgan (against Serbia)
