= 2015 UEFA European Under-21 Championship qualification Group 8 =

Football tournament qualification stage

The teams competing in Group 8 of the 2015 UEFA European Under-21 Championships qualifying competition were Israel, Portugal, Norway, Macedonia and Azerbaijan.

The ten group winners and the four best second-placed teams advanced to the play-offs.

== Standings ==
Pos	Team	Pld	W	D	L	GF	GA	GD	Pts	Qualification	Portugal	Israel	Norway	Azerbaijan	North Macedonia
1	Portugal	8	8	0	0	22	6	+16	24	Play-offs	—	3–0	5–1	3–1	2–0
2	Israel	8	5	0	3	22	15	+7	15		3–4	—	4–1	7–2	2–1
3	Norway	8	3	0	5	11	19	−8	9		1–2	1–3	—	1–3	2–1
4	Azerbaijan	8	2	1	5	9	15	−6	7		0–2	3–0	0–1	—	0–0
5	Macedonia	8	1	1	6	4	13	−9	4		0–1	0–3	1–3	1–0	—

Source: UEFA
Rules for classification: Tiebreakers

== Results and fixtures ==
All times are CEST (UTC+02:00) during summer and CET (UTC+01:00) during winter.

8 June 2013
15:00

Azerbaijan	0–0	Macedonia
	Report

Dalga Arena, Baku
Referee: Nikola Popov (Bulgaria)

5 September 2013
22:15

Portugal	5–1	Norway
Betinho 30'; Cavaleiro 35'; Oliveira 45+1'; Carvalho 63' (pen.); Pereira 78'	Report	Bakenga 15' (pen.)

Estádio Cidade de Barcelos, Barcelos
Referee: Tobias Welz (Germany)

8 September 2013
18:00

Israel	7–2	Azerbaijan
Dabbur 3', 51'; Micha 4' (pen.), 65'; Mizrahi 72', 84'; Saba 90+2'	Report	Erat 25'; Abasiyev 77'

Netanya Stadium, Netanya
Referee: Gerhard Grobelnik (Austria)
10 September 2013
17:00

Norway	2–1	Macedonia
Groven 3'; Bakenga 24' (pen.)	Report	Nikolov 72'

Marienlyst Stadion, Drammen
Referee: John Beaton (Scotland)

10 October 2013
17:00

Norway	1–3	Azerbaijan
Hussain 54'	Report	Erat 56', 90+5'; Ramazanov 69'

Marienlyst Stadion, Drammen
Referee: Michael Tykgaard (Denmark)
10 October 2013
19:15

Portugal	3–0	Israel
Carvalho 15'; Bruma 45'; Tawatha 78' (o.g.)	Report

Estádio Municipal da Marinha Grande, Marinha Grande
Referee: Stavros Tritsonis (Greece)

15 October 2013
13:00

Azerbaijan	0–2	Portugal
	Report	R. Silva 53'; Cavaleiro 64'

Bayil Stadium, Baku
Referee: Antti Munukka (Finland)
15 October 2013
17:00

Norway	1–3	Israel
Hussain 12'	Report	Dabbur 29'; Itzhak 38'; Agayov 85'

Marienlyst Stadion, Drammen
Referee: Aleksei Eskov (Russia)

15 November 2013
13:00

Israel	4–1	Norway
Dabbur 37', 49', 84'; Grøgaard 88' (o.g.)	Report	Ben-Shimon 83' (o.g.)

HaMoshava Stadium, Petah Tikva
Referee: Neil Doyle (Ireland)
15 November 2013
17:00

Macedonia	1–0	Azerbaijan
Velkovski 69'	Report

Philip II Arena, Skopje
Referee: Petr Ardeleánu (Czech Republic)

18 November 2013
18:30

Israel	3–4	Portugal
Dabbur 9'; Saba 55'; Tawatha 74'	Report	Cavaleiro 16'; Pereira 59'; B. Silva 64', 86'

HaMoshava Stadium, Petah Tikva
Referee: Stephan Klossner (Switzerland)
19 November 2013
19:30

Macedonia	1–3	Norway
Velkovski 45'	Report	Rashani 47'; Berisha 54' (pen.); Nielsen 71'

Philip II Arena, Skopje
Referee: Clayton Pisani (Malta)

5 March 2014
19:00

Portugal	2–0	Macedonia
B. Silva 51'; Esgaio 59' (pen.)	Report

Estádio Cidade de Barcelos, Barcelos
Referee: Barış Şimşek (Turkey)

23 May 2014
18:00

Macedonia	0–1	Portugal
	Report	Ilori 64'

Philip II Arena, Skopje
Referee: Robert Rogers (Republic of Ireland)

1 June 2014
17:00

Azerbaijan	0–1	Norway
	Report	Omoijuanfo 84'

Bayil Stadium, Baku
Referee: Anatoliy Abdula (Ukraine)

13 August 2014
20:00

Macedonia	0–3	Israel
	Report	Mizrahi 33', 41'; Gozlan 81'

Philip II Arena, Skopje
Referee: Kristo Tohver (Estonia)

3 September 2014
16:00

Azerbaijan	3–0	Israel
Ramazanov 22'; Hajiyev 31', 87'	Report

Dalga Arena, Baku
Referee: Andris Treimanis (Latvia)
4 September 2014
19:00

Norway	1–2	Portugal
Bakenga 66'	Report	Mané 22'; Pereira 62'

Marienlyst Stadion, Drammen
Referee: Arnold Hunter (Northern Ireland)

9 September 2014
17:00

Israel	2–1	Macedonia
Micha 25'; Dabbur 54' (pen.)	Report	Sulejmanov 48'

Antonis Papadopoulos, Larnaca
Referee: Marios Panayi (Cyprus)
9 September 2014
18:00

Portugal	3–1	Azerbaijan
R. Silva 13'; Ié 82'; Esgaio 90+1' (pen.)	Report	Abasiyev 55'

Estádio Municipal de Rio Maior, Rio Maior
Referee: Clayton Pisani (Malta)

== Goalscorers ==
8 goals

- (Israel) Mu'nas Dabbur

4 goals

- (Israel) Ofir Mizrahi

3 goals

- (Azerbaijan) Tuğrul Erat
- (Israel) Dor Micha
- (Norway) Mushaga Bakenga
- (Portugal) Ivan Cavaleiro
- (Portugal) Ricardo Pereira
- (Portugal) Bernardo Silva

2 goals

- (Azerbaijan) Abdulla Abatsiyev
- (Azerbaijan) Rahman Hajiyev
- (Azerbaijan) Ağabala Ramazanov
- (Israel) Dia Saba
- (North Macedonia) Darko Velkovski
- (Norway) Etzaz Hussain
- (Portugal) William Carvalho
- (Portugal) Ricardo Esgaio
- (Portugal) Rafa Silva

1 goal

- (Israel) Amir Agayov
- (Israel) Shoval Gozlan
- (Israel) Gil Itzhak
- (Israel) Taleb Tawatha
- (North Macedonia) Boban Nikolov
- (North Macedonia) Tauljant Sulejmanov
- (Norway) Valon Berisha
- (Norway) Alexander Groven
- (Norway) Håvard Nielsen
- (Norway) Ohi Omoijuanfo
- (Norway) Elbasan Rashani
- (Portugal) Betinho
- (Portugal) Bruma
- (Portugal) Edgar Ié
- (Portugal) Carlos Mané
- (Portugal) Sérgio Oliveira
- (Portugal) Tiago Ilori

1 own goal

- (Israel) Amir Ben-Shimon (against Norway)
- (Israel) Taleb Tawatha (against Portugal)
- (Norway) Thomas Grøgaard (against Israel)

== Notes ==
1. The Israel v Macedonia will be played outside Israel due to the 2014 Israel–Gaza conflict.
