= Aleksandr Kulinitš =

Estonian footballer

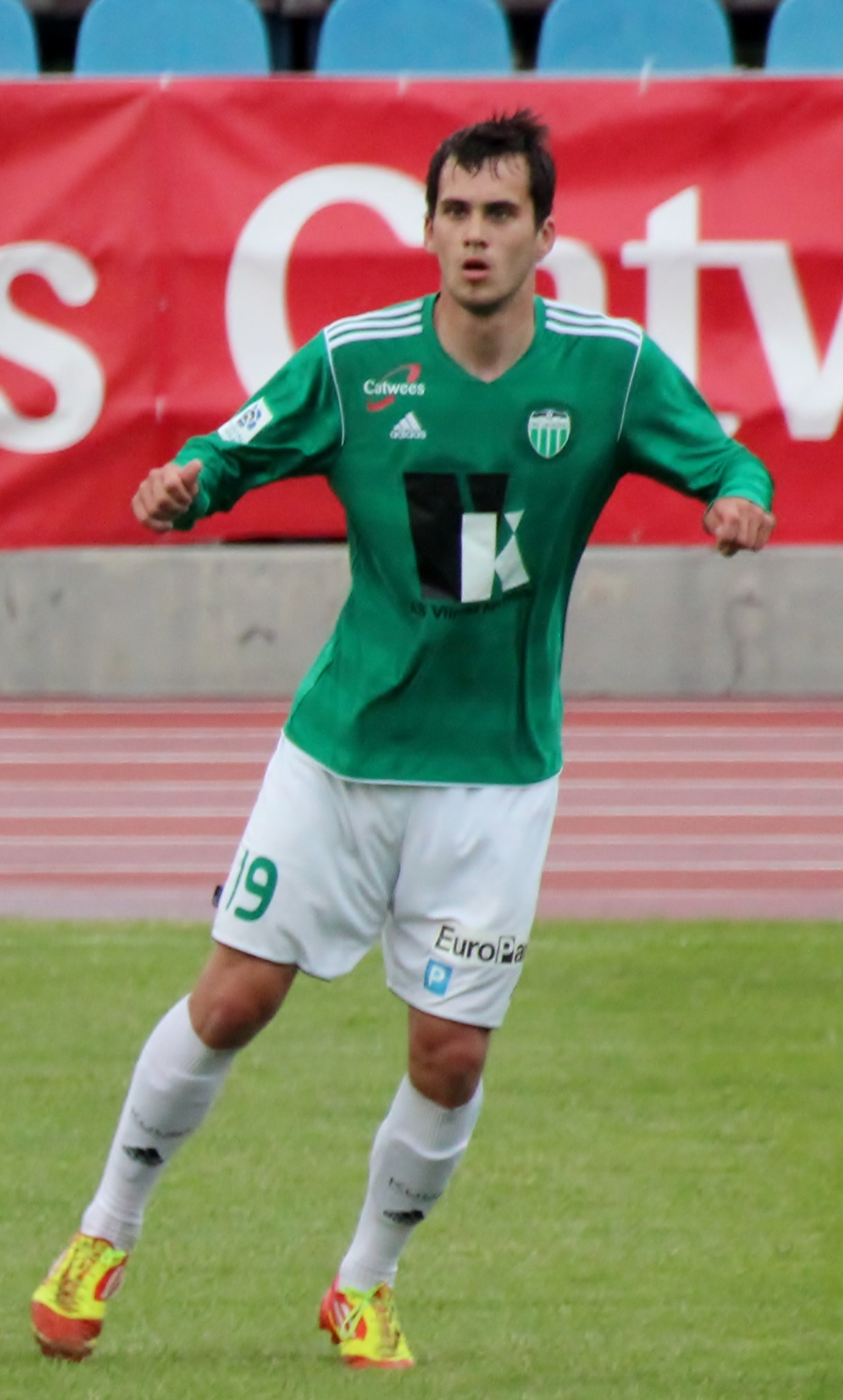
- Kulinitš in 2012

Personal information
- Date of birth: 24 May 1992 (age 34)
- Place of birth: Tallinn, Estonia
- Height: 1.88 m (6 ft 2 in)
- Position: Defender

Team information
- Current team: Maardu Linnameeskond
- Number: 19

Youth career
- 2002–2005: TJK
- 2006–2008: FCI Levadia

Senior career*
Years	Team	Apps	(Gls)
2008–2014	FCI Levadia	93	(3)
2008–2014	→ Levadia II	99	(2)
2015–2017	FCI Tallinn	81	(13)
2015	→ FCI Tallinn II	10	(1)
2018–2019	Krško	31	(2)
2019–2021	Nõmme Kalju	83	(6)
2022–2023	Narva Trans	49	(0)
2024–	Maardu Linnameeskond	75	(5)

International career
2008	Estonia U17	8	(0)
2010	Estonia U18	3	(0)
2009–2011	Estonia U19	21	(0)
2012–2014	Estonia U21	17	(1)
- * Club domestic league appearances and goals as of 24 July 2026

Aleksandr Kulinitš (born 24 May 1992) is an Estonian footballer who plays as a defender for Estonian club Maardu Linnameeskond.

== Career ==
Kulinits started his senior career with FCI Levadia Tallinn. In 2018, he signed for NK Krško in the Slovenian PrvaLiga, where he made thirty-five appearances and scored three goals.

In January 2019 he returned to Estonia and joined Nõmme Kalju.
