= 2015 UEFA European Under-21 Championship qualification =

Tournament details
- Dates: 22 March 2013 – 14 October 2014
- Teams: 52 (from 1 confederation)

Tournament statistics
- Matches played: 234
- Goals scored: 790 (3.38 per match)
- Top scorer: (England) Saido Berahino (10 goals)

The 2015 UEFA European Under-21 Championship started with a qualifying competition which began in March 2013 and finished in September 2014. The final tournament was held in the Czech Republic. The draw for the qualifying rounds was held on 31 January 2013 in Nyon, with matches played between March 2013 and September 2014.

There were ten groups. Two of these groups had six teams; the remaining eight groups consisted of five teams. Group competition was a double round robin: each team hosted a game with every other team in its group. At the conclusion of qualifying, the 10 teams at the top of each group and four best second-placed teams qualified for the two-legged play-offs scheduled in October 2014, with the seven winners of the play-off ties joining Czech Republic in the finals.

== Seeding ==
A total of fifty-two participating teams were divided in five draw pots based on the UEFA Under-21 coefficient ranking. Pots A through D contained ten teams, while pot E twelve teams.

Pot A	Pot B	Pot C	Pot D	Pot E
Spain; England; Netherlands; Italy; Germany; Switzerland; Russia; France; Sweden; Israel	Romania; Serbia; Turkey; Ukraine; Scotland; Portugal; Austria; Denmark; Belarus; Wales	Greece; Slovakia; Belgium; Hungary; Armenia; Croatia; Norway; Montenegro; Finland; Slovenia	Bosnia and Herzegovina; Poland; Georgia; Iceland; Moldova; Republic of Ireland; Bulgaria; Cyprus; Macedonia; Latvia	Northern Ireland; Albania; Faroe Islands; Lithuania; Azerbaijan; Kazakhstan; Estonia; Malta; Luxembourg; Andorra; Liechtenstein; San Marino

Before the draw UEFA confirmed that, for political reasons, Armenia would not be drawn against Azerbaijan (due to the dispute concerning territory of Nagorno-Karabakh) and Georgia would not be drawn against Russia (due to the dispute regarding the territory of South Ossetia and Abkhazia) in the qualifiers for 2015 UEFA European Under-21 Football Championship.

== Tiebreakers ==
If two or more teams are equal on points on completion of the group matches, the following criteria are applied to determine the rankings.

1. Higher number of points obtained in the group matches played among the teams in question
2. Superior goal difference from the group matches played among the teams in question
3. Higher number of goals scored in the group matches played among the teams in question
4. Higher number of goals scored away from home in the group matches played among the teams in question
5. If, after applying criteria 1) to 4) to several teams, two or more teams still have an equal ranking, the criteria 1) to 4) will be reapplied to determine the ranking of these teams. If this procedure does not lead to a decision, criteria 6) and 7) will apply
6. Results of all group matches:
  1. Superior goal difference
  2. Higher number of goals scored
  3. Higher number of goals scored away from home
7. Position in the UEFA Under-21 coefficient ranking used for the group stage draw

== Qualifying group stage ==
Key to colours in group tables
Group winners and four best runners up advance to the play-offs

=== Group 1 ===
Pos	Team	Pld	W	D	L	GF	GA	GD	Pts	Qualification	England	Finland	Moldova	Wales	Lithuania	San Marino
1	England	10	9	1	0	31	2	+29	28	Play-offs	—	3–0	1–0	1–0	5–0	9–0
2	Finland	10	4	4	2	17	10	+7	16		1–1	—	1–0	2–2	2–2	5–0
3	Moldova	10	5	1	4	12	6	+6	16		0–3	1–0	—	0–0	3–0	2–0
4	Wales	10	3	3	4	12	13	−1	12		1–3	1–5	1–0	—	2–0	4–0
5	Lithuania	10	2	2	6	6	19	−13	8		0–1	0–1	0–3	1–1	—	2–1
6	San Marino	10	1	1	8	2	30	−28	4		0–4	0–0	0–3	1–0	0–1	—

Source: UEFA

=== Group 2 ===
Pos	Team	Pld	W	D	L	GF	GA	GD	Pts	Qualification	Denmark	Russia	Slovenia	Bulgaria	Estonia	Andorra
1	Denmark	10	8	2	0	37	9	+28	26	Play-offs	—	4–2	2–2	7–1	8–0	6–0
2	Russia	10	7	1	2	22	12	+10	22		0–2	—	2–1	3–1	1–0	5–0
3	Slovenia	10	5	2	3	29	11	+18	17		2–2	0–1	—	2–1	0–1	5–0
4	Bulgaria	10	2	3	5	18	26	−8	9		2–3	3–3	1–5	—	1–1	3–0
5	Estonia	10	2	3	5	9	23	−14	9		0–1	1–2	1–7	2–2	—	1–1
6	Andorra	10	0	1	9	1	35	−34	1		0–2	0–3	0–5	0–3	0–2	—

Source: UEFA

=== Group 3 ===
Pos	Team	Pld	W	D	L	GF	GA	GD	Pts	Qualification	Slovakia	Netherlands	Scotland	Georgia	Luxembourg
1	Slovakia	8	5	2	1	19	7	+12	17	Play-offs	—	2–2	1–1	1–0	3–0
2	Netherlands	8	5	1	2	22	6	+16	16	Play-offs	0–1	—	4–0	0–1	3–1
3	Scotland	8	3	2	3	12	15	−3	11		2–1	1–6	—	1–1	3–0
4	Georgia	8	3	1	4	8	15	−7	10		1–3	0–6	2–1	—	0–3 (Note: Match originally ended as a 1–1 draw, but UEFA later awarded the match as a 3–0 forfeit win to Luxembourg.)
5	Luxembourg	8	1	0	7	5	23	−18	3		1–7	0–1	0–3	0–3	—

Source: UEFA

=== Group 4 ===
Pos	Team	Pld	W	D	L	GF	GA	GD	Pts	Qualification	Spain	Austria	Hungary	Bosnia and Herzegovina	Albania
1	Spain	8	7	1	0	24	6	+18	22	Play-offs	—	1–1	1–0	3–2	4–0
2	Austria	8	5	1	2	15	12	+3	16		2–6	—	4–2	2–0	1–3
3	Hungary	8	3	0	5	12	13	−1	9		0–1	0–2	—	4–1	0–2
4	Bosnia and Herzegovina	8	2	0	6	10	22	−12	6		1–6	0–2	1–4	—	4–1
5	Albania	8	2	0	6	7	15	−8	6		0–2	0–1	1–2	0–1	—

Source: UEFA

=== Group 5 ===
Pos	Team	Pld	W	D	L	GF	GA	GD	Pts	Qualification	Croatia	Ukraine	Switzerland	Latvia	Liechtenstein
1	Croatia	8	6	1	1	20	5	+15	19	Play-offs	—	1–1	0–2	3–1	4–0
2	Ukraine	8	6	1	1	20	8	+12	19	Play-offs	0–2	—	2–0	2–1	3–0
3	Switzerland	8	5	0	3	23	8	+15	15		0–2	1–2	—	7–1	5–1
4	Latvia	8	2	0	6	11	22	−11	6		1–3	1–5	0–2	—	4–0
5	Liechtenstein	8	0	0	8	3	34	−31	0		0–5	2–5	0–6	0–2	—

Source: UEFA

=== Group 6 ===
Pos	Team	Pld	W	D	L	GF	GA	GD	Pts	Qualification	Germany	Romania	Montenegro	Ireland	Faroe Islands
1	Germany	8	6	2	0	25	5	+20	20	Play-offs	—	8–0	2–0	2–0	3–2
2	Romania	8	3	3	2	14	19	−5	12		2–2	—	4–3	0–0	3–1
3	Montenegro	8	3	2	3	12	11	+1	11		1–1	3–2	—	0–0	3–0
4	Republic of Ireland	8	2	2	4	10	12	−2	8		0–4	0–1	1–2	—	5–2
5	Faroe Islands	8	1	1	6	9	23	−14	4		0–3	2–2	1–0	1–4	—

Source: UEFA

=== Group 7 ===
Pos	Team	Pld	W	D	L	GF	GA	GD	Pts	Qualification	Sweden	Greece	Poland	Turkey	Malta
1	Sweden	8	5	1	2	20	14	+6	16	Play-offs	—	3–0	3–1	4–3	5–0
2	Greece	8	5	0	3	20	10	+10	15		5–1	—	3–1	2–1	5–0
3	Poland	8	5	0	3	17	10	+7	15		2–0	3–1	—	3–1	2–0
4	Turkey	8	4	1	3	16	11	+5	13		2–2	1–0	1–0	—	4–0
5	Malta	8	0	0	8	2	30	−28	0		1–2	0–4	1–5	0–3	—

Source: UEFA

=== Group 8 ===
Pos	Team	Pld	W	D	L	GF	GA	GD	Pts	Qualification	Portugal	Israel	Norway	Azerbaijan	North Macedonia
1	Portugal	8	8	0	0	22	6	+16	24	Play-offs	—	3–0	5–1	3–1	2–0
2	Israel	8	5	0	3	22	15	+7	15		3–4	—	4–1	7–2	2–1
3	Norway	8	3	0	5	11	19	−8	9		1–2	1–3	—	1–3	2–1
4	Azerbaijan	8	2	1	5	9	15	−6	7		0–2	3–0	0–1	—	0–0
5	Macedonia	8	1	1	6	4	13	−9	4		0–1	0–3	1–3	1–0	—

Source: UEFA

=== Group 9 ===
Pos	Team	Pld	W	D	L	GF	GA	GD	Pts	Qualification	Italy	Serbia	Belgium	Cyprus	
1	Italy	8	6	0	2	19	7	+12	18	Play-offs	—	3–2	1–3	7–1	3–0
2	Serbia	8	5	1	2	18	10	+8	16	Play-offs	1–0	—	2–2	2–1	3–1
3	Belgium	8	5	1	2	15	7	+8	16		0–1	0–3	—	2–0	1–0
4	Cyprus	8	2	0	6	7	21	−14	6		0–2	2–1	0–6	—	3–0
5	Northern Ireland	8	1	0	7	3	17	−14	3		0–2	1–4	0–1	1–0	—

Source: UEFA

=== Group 10 ===
Pos	Team	Pld	W	D	L	GF	GA	GD	Pts	Qualification	France	Iceland	Kazakhstan	Armenia	Belarus
1	France	8	7	1	0	28	7	+21	22	Play-offs	—	1–1	5–0	6–0	1–0
2	Iceland	8	5	1	2	20	11	+9	16	Play-offs	3–4	—	2–0	4–0	4–1
3	Kazakhstan	8	3	0	5	8	18	−10	9		1–5	3–2	—	0–1	1–2
4	Armenia	8	3	0	5	7	19	−12	9		1–4	1–2	1–2	—	2–1
5	Belarus	8	1	0	7	6	14	−8	3		1–2	1–2	0–1	0–1	—

Source: UEFA

=== Ranking of second-placed teams ===
Because some groups contain six teams and some five, matches against the sixth-placed team in each group are not included in this ranking. As a result, eight matches played by each team will count for the purposes of the second-placed table.

The following criteria are applied to determine the rankings.

1. Higher number of points obtained in these matches
2. Superior goal difference from these matches
3. Higher number of goals scored in these matches
4. Higher number of away goals scored in these matches
5. Position in the UEFA Under-21 coefficient ranking used for the group stage draw

Pos	Grp	Team	Pld	W	D	L	GF	GA	GD	Pts	Qualification
1	5	Ukraine	8	6	1	1	20	8	+12	19	Play-offs
2	3	Netherlands	8	5	1	2	22	6	+16	16	Play-offs
3	10	Iceland	8	5	1	2	20	11	+9	16	Play-offs
4	9	Serbia	8	5	1	2	18	10	+8	16	Play-offs
5	4	Austria	8	5	1	2	15	12	+3	16	
6	2	Russia	8	5	1	2	14	12	+2	16	
7	7	Greece	8	5	0	3	20	10	+10	15	
8	8	Israel	8	5	0	3	22	15	+7	15	
9	1	Finland	8	3	3	2	12	10	+2	12	
10	6	Romania	8	3	3	2	14	19	−5	12	

Source: UEFA
Rules for classification: 1) Points; 2) Goal difference; 3) Goals scored; 4) Away goals scored; 5) National team coefficient.

== Play-offs ==
The play-offs for the tournament finals were held on 9,10 and 14 October 2014. The seven winners qualify for the final tournament in Czech Republic.

=== Seedings ===
The draw for the play-offs was held on 12 September 2014 in Nyon to determine the seven pairings as well as the order of the home and away ties. The seven group winners with the highest competition coefficients were seeded and were drawn against the unseeded teams. Nations from the same group could not be drawn against each other.

Each nation's coefficient was generated by calculating:

- 40% of the average ranking points per game earned in the 2015 UEFA European Under-21 Championship qualifying group stage.
- 40% of the average ranking points per game earned in the 2013 UEFA European Under-21 Championship qualifying stage and final tournament.
- 20% of the average ranking points per game earned in the 2011 UEFA European Under-21 Championship qualifying stage and final tournament.

Seeded

- Spain
- Italy
- England
- France
- Germany
- Portugal
- Denmark

Unseeded

- Sweden
- Slovakia
- Croatia
- Ukraine
- Netherlands
- Iceland
- Serbia

=== Matches ===
Team 1	Agg.	Team 2	1st leg	2nd leg
Slovakia	2–4	Italy	1–1	1–3
France	3–4	Sweden	2–0	1–4
Denmark	1–1 (a)	Iceland	0–0	1–1
England	4–2	Croatia	2–1	2–1
Netherlands	4–7	Portugal	0–2	4–5
Ukraine	0–5	Germany	0–3	0–2
Serbia	2–1	Spain	0–0	2–1

== Top goalscorers ==
The top scorers in the 2015 UEFA European Under-21 Championship qualification were as follows. Players in italics have also played in the play-offs.

Rank	Name	Goals	Apps	Minutes played
1	(England) Saido Berahino	10	10	800
2	(Poland) Arkadiusz Milik	9	6	517
3	(Spain) Álvaro Morata	8	7	583
3	(Iceland) Emil Atlason	8	10	599
3	(Israel) Mu'nas Dabbur	8	7	616
6	(Croatia) Marcelo Brozović	7	7	586
6	(Netherlands) Quincy Promes	7	7	596
6	(Germany) Philipp Hofmann	7	10	726
