= Fabio Hoxha =

Albanian footballer (born 1993)

Personal information
- Full name: Fabio Hoxha
- Date of birth: 7 May 1993 (age 33)
- Place of birth: Durrës, Albania
- Height: 1.77 m (5 ft 10 in)
- Position: Striker

Team information
- Current team: ASD Salsomaggiore

Youth career
- 2003–2010: Inter Milan
- 2010–2011: → Piacenza (loan)
- 2011–2012: Varese

Senior career*
Years	Team	Apps	(Gls)
2012	Tirana	2	(0)
2013	US Giubiasco		
2013–2014	Team Ticino	10	(2)
2013–2014	ASD Brugherio Calcio		
2013–2014	SSD Luciano Manara 09		
2013–2014	ASD Nibbiano & Valtidone		
2018-	ASD Salsomaggiore		

International career
2009	Albania U17	3	(1)
2009–2011	Albania U19	5	(2)
2011–	Albania U21	8	(1)
- * Club domestic league appearances and goals

Fabio Hoxha (born 7 May 1993 in Durrës) is an Albanian football player who currently plays for Italian lower league side Salsomaggiore.

== Club career ==
Hoxha joined the Inter Milan academy in 2003 where he played through the age groups before being loaned out to Piacenza for the 2010–11 season. He left Inter Milan once his loan with Piacenza ended, joining Varese in the summer of 2011.

Hoxha joined Albanian side KF Tirana in August 2012, where he made his professional debut. He was released by the club in March 2013.

He signed for Swiss side Team Ticino from Giubiasco in the summer of 2013, joining the club's U21 team for the 2013–14 season. In November 2018, he joined Salsomaggiore after an unsuccessful spell at Nibbiano & Valtidone.
