= Ryan Scicluna =

Maltese footballer

Personal information
- Date of birth: 30 July 1993 (age 33)
- Height: 1.76 m (5 ft 9 1/2 in)
- Position: Midfielder

Team information
- Current team: Żabbar St. Patrick
- Number: 30

Senior career*
Years	Team	Apps	(Gls)
2009–2020	Birkirkara	170	(13)
2019–2020	→ Balzan (loan)	9	(0)
2020–2021	Sirens	18	(0)
2021–2023	Birkirkara	26	(0)
2023–2025	Marsaxlokk	54	(0)
2025–	Żabbar St. Patrick	23	(0)

International career
2014–2016	Malta	6	(0)
- * Club domestic league appearances and goals as of 18 May 2026

Ryan Scicluna (born 30 July 1993) is a Maltese international footballer who plays for Żabbar St. Patrick as a midfielder.

== Career ==
Scicluna has played club football for Birkirkara.

He made his international debut for Malta in 2014.

On 11 August 2019, Scicluna was loaned out from Birkirkara to Balzan until June 2020.
