= Tomislav Barišić =

Bosnian footballer

Personal information
- Date of birth: 6 March 1993 (age 33)
- Place of birth: Posušje, Bosnia and Herzegovina
- Height: 1.81 m (5 ft 11 in)
- Position: Right-back

Youth career
- Dinamo Zagreb
- –2012: Zagreb

Senior career*
Years	Team	Apps	(Gls)
2012–2014	Zagreb	18	(0)
2013	→ Rudeš (loan)	7	(0)
2014–2016	Velež Mostar	27	(0)
2016–2017	Rudeš	19	(1)
2017	Celje	8	(0)
2017–2018	Lučko	28	(3)
2018–2019	Dinamo Zagreb II	23	(0)
2019–2020	Zrinjski Mostar	7	(0)

International career
2013	Bosnia and Herzegovina U21	6	(0)
- * Club domestic league appearances and goals as of 23 November 2019

Tomislav Barišić (born 6 March 1993) is a Bosnian professional footballer who plays as a right-back. He most recently played for Bosnian Premier League club Zrinjski Mostar.

== Honours ==
Zagreb

- 2. HNL: 2013–14
