= Stevan Vilotić =

Yugoslav footballer and manager

Personal information
- Date of birth: 15 September 1925
- Place of birth: Šabac, Kingdom of Serbs, Croats, and Slovenes
- Date of death: 27 June 1989 (aged 63)
- Place of death: Belgrade, SFR Yugoslavia

Senior career*
Years	Team	Apps	(Gls)
1947–1948	Metalac Beograd	5	(0)
1948–1955	Mačva Šabac		

Managerial career
- Mačva Šabac
- 1967: Partizan
- 1969: Partizan
- 1971–1972: Rijeka
- 1977: Yugoslavia
- 1978: Yugoslavia
- * Club domestic league appearances and goals

Stevan "Ćele" Vilotić (Serbian Cyrillic: Стеван "Ћеле" Вилотић; 15 September 1925 – 27 June 1989) was a Yugoslav football manager and player. He managed numerous teams, most notably Partizan and the Yugoslavia national team.
