= Steve Pisani =

Maltese footballer

Personal information
- Full name: Steve Pisani
- Date of birth: 7 August 1992 (age 34)
- Place of birth: Malta
- Position: Winger

Team information
- Current team: Sliema Wanderers
- Number: 70

Senior career*
Years	Team	Apps	(Gls)
2010–2012	Hibernians	48	(7)
2012–2018	Floriana	162	(15)
2019–2021	Balzan	8	(0)
2021–2023	Gżira United	50	(3)
2023–2024	St. Lucia	22	(2)
2024–	Sliema Wanderers	55	(3)

International career^{‡}
2010–2011	Malta U19	4	(0)
2013–2015	Malta U21	14	(1)
2016–	Malta	43	(1)
- * Club domestic league appearances and goals as of 18 May 2026 ‡ National team caps and goals as of 20:00, 13 November 2026 (UTC)

Steve Pisani (born 7 August 1992) is a Maltese footballer who plays for Sliema Wanderers and the Malta national team. Pisani has also played for the Malta U19 and U21 teams.
