= Simon Kühne =

Liechtenstein footballer

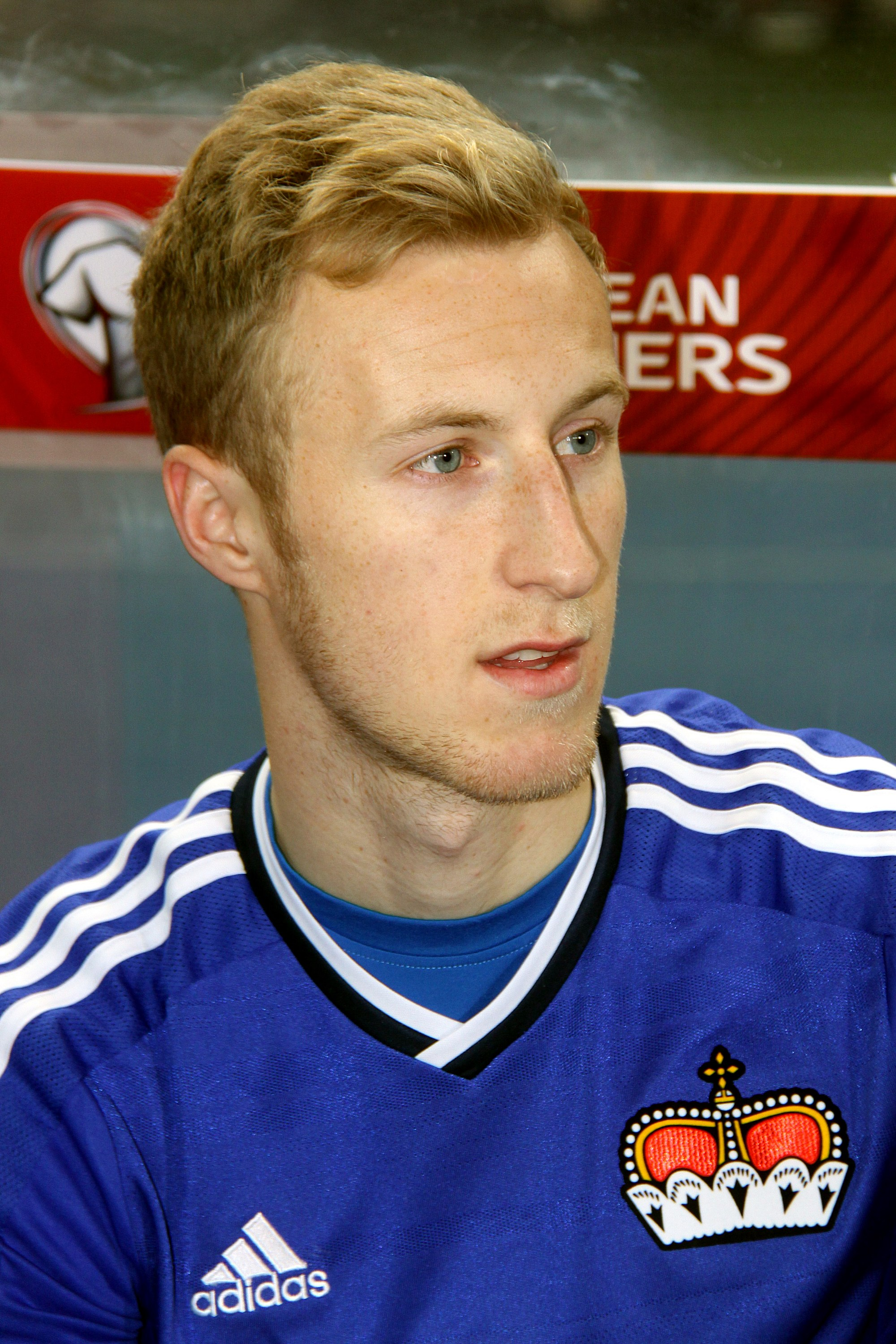

Personal information
- Date of birth: 30 April 1994 (age 32)
- Place of birth: Austria
- Height: 1.79 m (5 ft 10 1/2 in)
- Position: Winger

Team information
- Current team: SK Meiningen

Senior career*
Years	Team	Apps	(Gls)
2012–2014	Austria Lustenau	10	(0)
2014	FC St. Gallen II	10	(0)
2014–2015	USV Eschen/Mauren	12	(2)
2015–2016	FC St. Gallen II	24	(4)
2016–2022	USV Eschen/Mauren	68	(10)
2022–	SK Meiningen	39	(17)

International career^{‡}
2013–2016	Liechtenstein U21	10	(3)
2014–2020	Liechtenstein	25	(0)
- * Club domestic league appearances and goals as of 6 June 2026 ‡ National team caps and goals as of 18 October 2020

Simon Kühne (born 30 April 1994) is a footballer who plays for SK Meiningen as a winger. Born in Austria, he represents the Liechtenstein national team.

== Career ==
Born in Austria, Kühne has also played for Austria Lustenau, USV Eschen/Mauren and FC St. Gallen.

He made his senior international debut for Liechtenstein in 2014, having previously played for the under-21 team, where he is currently the nation's all-time top goalscorer with three.
