= Bertul Kocabaş =

Turkish footballer

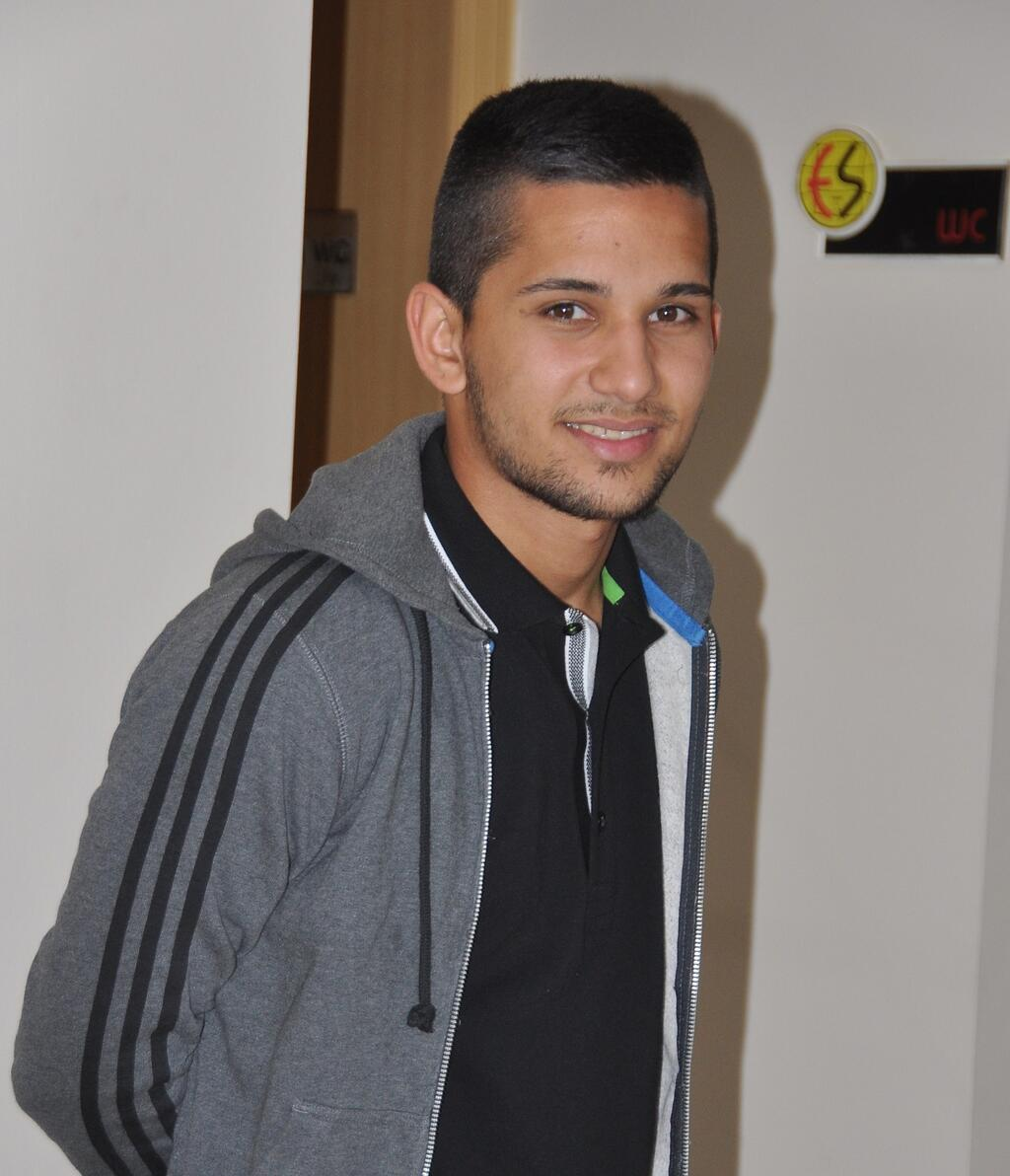

Personal information
- Date of birth: 15 February 1992 (age 34)
- Place of birth: Hamm, Germany
- Height: 1.71 m (5 ft 7 in)
- Position: Forward

Team information
- Current team: İskenderunspor
- Number: 78

Senior career*
Years	Team	Apps	(Gls)
2010	Rot Weiss Ahlen	0	(0)
2011–2012	Hamburger SV II	48	(15)
2012–2015	Karabükspor	13	(0)
2013–2014	→ Eskişehirspor (loan)	2	(0)
2015–2016	Rot-Weiß Oberhausen	15	(3)
2016–2023	Sarıyer	207	(27)
2023–	İskenderunspor	12	(0)

International career^{‡}
2012–2013	Turkey U21	7	(5)
- * Club domestic league appearances and goals as of 1 October 2023 ‡ National team caps and goals as of 18:17, 9 September 2014 (UTC)

Bertul Kocabaş (born 15 February 1992) is a footballer who plays for İskenderunspor. He made his Süper Lig debut against Antalyaspor on 21 September 2012. Born in Germany, he represented Turkey at under-21 international level.
