= Enej Jelenič =

Slovenian footballer (born 1992)

Personal information
- Date of birth: 11 December 1992 (age 33)
- Place of birth: Koper, Slovenia
- Height: 1.81 m (5 ft 11 in)
- Positions: Attacking midfielder; winger

Youth career
- –2009: Jadran Dekani
- 2009–2010: Koper

Senior career*
Years	Team	Apps	(Gls)
2009	Jadran Dekani	5	(0)
2010–2011	Koper	12	(2)
2011	Genoa	2	(0)
2011–2014	Padova	42	(1)
2014–2017	Livorno	73	(9)
2017–2020	Carpi	77	(10)
2020–2023	Padova	102	(11)
2023–2024	Koper	27	(5)
2024–2025	Novara	1	(0)
2025	→ Koper (loan)	4	(1)

International career
2010	Slovenia U19	5	(2)
2011–2012	Slovenia U20	2	(0)
2010–2014	Slovenia U21	24	(6)
2016	Slovenia	1	(0)
- * Club domestic league appearances and goals

Enej Jelenič (born 11 December 1992) is a retired Slovenian footballer who played as a midfielder.

== Club career ==
On 10 September 2020, Jelenič signed a two-year contract with Padova.

== International career ==
Jelenič was a youth international for Slovenia. He made his senior international debut on 23 March 2016 against Macedonia.
