= Milen Gamakov =

Bulgarian footballer (born 1994)

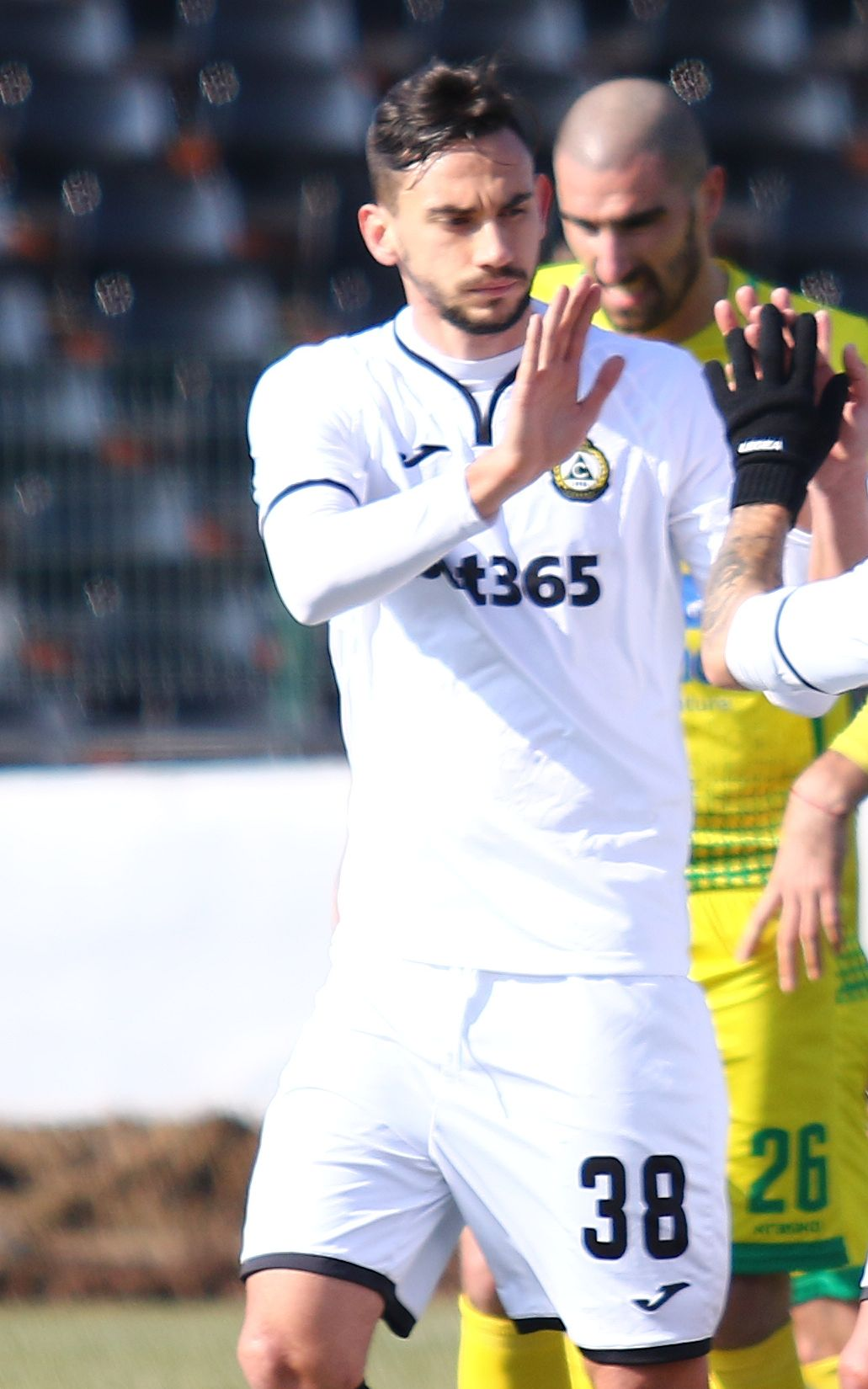

Personal information
- Full name: Milen Georgiev Gamakov
- Date of birth: 12 April 1994 (age 32)
- Place of birth: Burgas, Bulgaria
- Height: 1.89 m (6 ft 2 1/2 in)
- Positions: Centre back; defensive midfielder

Team information
- Current team: Neftochimic Burgas

Youth career
- 2009–2012: Chernomorets Burgas

Senior career*
| Years | Team | Apps | (Gls) |
| 2013–2014 | Chernomorets Burgas | 27 | (0) |
| 2013 | → Neftochimic 1986 (loan) | 8 | (0) |
| 2014–2016 | Botev Plovdiv | 55 | (4) |
| 2016–2018 | Lechia Gdańsk | 4 | (0) |
| 2017 | → Ruch Chorzów (loan) | 2 | (0) |
| 2017 | → Stomil Olsztyn (loan) | 11 | (0) |
| 2018–2021 | Slavia Sofia | 71 | (0) |
| 2021 | Žalgiris | 20 | (1) |
| 2022 | Taraz | 22 | (1) |
| 2023 | Sozopol | 14 | (2) |
| 2023–2024 | Dobrudzha | 31 | (0) |
| 2024 | Hebar | 15 | (0) |
| 2025 | Peyia 2014 | 13 | (0) |
| 2025–2026 | Belasitsa Petrich | 16 | (0) |
| 2026– | Neftochimic Burgas | | |

International career
| 2010 | Bulgaria U17 | 3 | (0) |
| 2011–2013 | Bulgaria U19 | 2 | (0) |
| 2013–2016 | Bulgaria U21 | 20 | (2) |
- * Club domestic league appearances and goals as of 5 March 2026

Milen Georgiev Gamakov (Bulgarian: Милен Георгиев Гамаков; born 12 April 1994) is a Bulgarian professional footballer who plays as a defender or midfielder for Neftochimic Burgas.

== Career ==
=== Early career and loan ===
Gamakov is youth player of Chernomorets Burgas since 2009. In 2013, he was sent on loan at Neftochimic Burgas till end of season 2013. He won promotion in A group with the team.

=== Chernomorets Burgas ===
After the 2012–13 season and his good performances at Neftochimic, he returned to Chernomorets. He made his debut for the team in the first match of 2013–14 season against Cherno More Varna as a substitute.

=== Botev Plovdiv ===
On 12 July 2014, Gamakov signed with Botev Plovdiv.

On 13 August, he scored a goal in the Bulgarian Supercup final, but despite his performance Botev lost 1–3 to Ludogorets Razgrad.

Milen scored the opening goal in the derby game against Beroe Stara Zagora on 24 October. He was among the best players in the match although he was substituted at the 68th minute of a 3–1 win.

On 15 March 2015, Gamakov scored the first goal with a header in a 2–0 home win over CSKA Sofia.

On 16 and 23 May Milen Gamakov was included in the starting lineup as a defensive midfielder for the 3–2 home win over CSKA Sofia and the 1–2 away defeat to Beroe Stara Zagora. He played well, but received yellow cards in both games.

Milen Gamakov was named the second-place winner of the best youth player in A Grupa for the 2014–15 season. His teammate Tsvetelin Chunchukov won the first prize.

==== 2015–16 season ====
For Botev, the 2015–16 season was marked with a lot of managerial changes. Despite this, Gamakov was regularly included in the starting lineup. In February 2016, due to a lot of injuries of his teammates, Nikolay Kostov started using Gamakov as a central defender.

On 13 March 2016, Gamakov played as a midfielder and scored one of the goals in a 3–1 win over Cherno More Varna.

=== Lechia Gdańsk ===
In June 2016, Gamakov signed with Polish Ekstraklasa side Lechia Gdańsk. He spent the second half of the 2016–17 season on loan at Ruch Chorzów.

=== Slavia Sofia ===
On 1 June 2018, Gamakov signed a two-year contract with Slavia Sofia.

=== Belasitsa Petrich ===
In June 2025, he joined B PFG club Belasitsa Petrich.

== International career ==
=== Under-21 ===
Gamakov made him international debut for Bulgaria U21 in a 3–1 friendly win against Azerbaijan, with Gamakov scoring in the additional time.

Antoni Zdravkov was appointed manager of the under-21 team in October 2014 and selected Gamakov as the new captain.

Gamakov missed the game against Wales due to a ban. In the next game, on 9 June 2015, he played 90 minutes during a 1–0 win in a friendly game over Cyprus.

In September 2015, Gamakov was in the starting lineup for a 0–2 away victory over Romania and a 3–0 home win over Luxembourg. He was the captain of the team and played 90 minutes in both games.

On 25 March 2016, Gamakov was in the starting lineup as a captain for the goalless draw with Wales. Four days later, on 29 March, he played in another goalless draw, this time against Luxembourg.

On 21 May 2016, Gamakov was in the starting lineup during the 0–1 defeat from France. On 6 June he played during the 0–2 defeat in a friendly game from Norway U21.

=== Senior ===
Gamakov was included in the Bulgaria national football team for the first time on 6 November 2014. He remained an unused substitute for a 1–1 draw with Malta.

== Club statistics ==
As of 27 May 2016

| Club performance | | | League | | Cup | | Continental | | Other | | Total | |
| Club | League | Season | Apps | Goals | Apps | Goals | Apps | Goals | Apps | Goals | Apps | Goals |
| Bulgaria | | | League | | CCB Cup | | Europe | | Other (Note: Includes Bulgarian Supercup matches.) | | Total | |
|---|---|---|---|---|---|---|---|---|---|---|---|---|
| Chernomorets Burgas | A Group | 2012–13 | 0 | 0 | 0 | 0 | – | | – | | 0 | 0 |
| Neftochimic Burgas (loan) | B Group | 2012–13 | 8 | 0 | 0 | 0 | – | | – | | 8 | 0 |
| Chernomorets Burgas | A Group | 2013–14 | 27 | 0 | 2 | 0 | – | | – | | 29 | 0 |
| Chernomorets Burgas | Total | | 27 | 0 | 2 | 0 | 0 | 0 | 0 | 0 | 29 | 0 |
| Botev Plovdiv | A Group | 2014–15 | 28 | 3 | 1 | 0 | 2 | 0 | 1 | 1 | 32 | 4 |
| Botev Plovdiv | A Group | 2015–16 | 27 | 1 | 1 | 0 | – | | – | | 28 | 1 |
| Botev Plovdiv | Total | | 55 | 4 | 2 | 0 | 2 | 0 | 1 | 1 | 60 | 5 |
| Career Total | | | 90 | 4 | 4 | 0 | 2 | 0 | 1 | 1 | 97 | 5 |

== Honours ==
Žalgiris

- A Lyga: 2021
- Lithuanian Cup: 2021
