= 2015 UEFA European Under-21 Championship qualification play-offs =

The 2015 UEFA European Under-21 Championship qualification play-offs constituted the second and final round of the 2015 UEFA European Under-21 Championship qualification tournament. The ties were contested over two legs, with the first leg played on 9 and 10 October and the second leg played on 14 October 2014. The seven winners qualified for the final tournament in Czech Republic.

== Seedings ==
The draw for the play-offs was held on 12 September 2014 in Nyon to determine the seven pairings as well as the order of the home and away ties. The seven group winners with the highest competition coefficients were seeded and those teams were drawn against the unseeded teams. Nations from the same group could not be drawn against each other.

Each nation's coefficient was generated by calculating:

- 40% of the average ranking points per game earned in the 2015 UEFA European Under-21 Championship qualifying group stage.
- 40% of the average ranking points per game earned in the 2013 UEFA European Under-21 Championship qualifying stage and final tournament.
- 20% of the average ranking points per game earned in the 2011 UEFA European Under-21 Championship qualifying stage and final tournament.

Seeded

- Spain
- Italy
- England
- France
- Germany
- Portugal
- Denmark

Unseeded

- Sweden
- Slovakia
- Croatia
- Ukraine
- Netherlands
- Iceland
- Serbia

== Matches ==
Team 1	Agg.	Team 2	1st leg	2nd leg
Slovakia	2–4	Italy	1–1	1–3
France	3–4	Sweden	2–0	1–4
Denmark	1–1 (a)	Iceland	0–0	1–1
England	4–2	Croatia	2–1	2–1
Netherlands	4–7	Portugal	0–2	4–5
Ukraine	0–5	Germany	0–3	0–2
Serbia	2–1	Spain	0–0	2–1

All times listed are CEST (UTC+02:00).

=== First leg ===
9 October 2014
18:30

Netherlands	0−2	Portugal
	Report	Oliveira 45' (pen.); Mané 82'

AFAS Stadion, Alkmaar
Attendance: 11,659
Referee: Anastasios Sidiropoulos (Greece)

10 October 2014
17:00

Serbia	0–0	Spain
	Report

Jagodina City Stadium, Jagodina
Attendance: 7,500
Referee: Sergei Karasev (Russia)

10 October 2014
17:00

Slovakia	1–1	Italy
Zreľák 69'	Report	Belotti 54'

Štadión FC ViOn, Zlaté Moravce
Attendance: 3,847
Referee: Artur Soares Dias (Portugal)

10 October 2014
17:30

Ukraine	0–3	Germany
	Report	P. Hofmann 35'; Volland 61'; J. Hofmann 79'

Tsentralnyi Stadion, Cherkasy
Attendance: 9,442
Referee: Halis Özkahya (Turkey)

10 October 2014
18:00

Denmark	0–0	Iceland
	Report

Nordjyske Arena, Aalborg
Attendance: 6,125
Referee: Liran Liany (Israel)

10 October 2014
18:45

England	2–1	Croatia
Kane 58'; Berahino 85' (pen.)	Report	Livaja 13'

Molineux Stadium, Wolverhampton
Attendance: 23,107
Referee: Javier Estrada Fernández (Spain)

10 October 2014
18:45

France	2–0	Sweden
Thauvin 44' (pen.); Kondogbia 81'	Report

MMArena, Le Mans
Attendance: 8,896
Referee: Kenn Hansen (Denmark)

=== Second leg ===
14 October 2014
16:00

Italy	3−1	Slovakia
Bernardeschi 5'; Belotti 15' (pen.); Longo 90'	Report	Lobotka 63'

Mapei Stadium – Città del Tricolore, Reggio Emilia
Attendance: 5,149
Referee: Steven McLean (Scotland)

Italy won 4–2 on aggregate.

14 October 2014
18:00

Croatia	1–2	England
Livaja 38'	Report	Moore 9'; Hughes 73'

Stadion HNK Cibalia, Vinkovci
Attendance: 6,352
Referee: Clément Turpin (France)

England won 4–2 on aggregate.

14 October 2014
18:00

Germany	2–0	Ukraine
Volland 89'; Bittencourt 90+1'	Report

Stadion Essen, Essen
Attendance: 5,128
Referee: Danny Makkelie (Netherlands)

Germany won 5–0 on aggregate.

14 October 2014
18:00

Portugal	5–4	Netherlands
Vezo 13'; Neves 20'; Ricardo 50', 66'; B. Silva 87'	Report	Weghorst 15'; Kongolo 45+2'; Aké 64', 89' (pen.)

Estádio da Mata Real, Paços de Ferreira
Attendance: 4,480
Referee: Michael Oliver (England)

Portugal won 7–4 on aggregate.

14 October 2014
18:00

Spain	1–2	Serbia
Roberto 90+2'	Report	Gayà 31' (o.g.); Kostić 90+3'

Estadio Ramón de Carranza, Cádiz
Attendance: 17,200
Referee: Felix Zwayer (Germany)

Serbia won 2–1 on aggregate.

14 October 2014
18:15

Iceland	1–1	Denmark
Friðjónsson 90+3' (pen.)	Report	Thomsen 90'

Laugardalsvöllur, Reykjavík
Attendance: 2,503
Referee: István Vad (Hungary)

1–1 on aggregate. Denmark won on away goals rule.

14 October 2014
20:00

Sweden	4–1	France
Kiese Thelin 3', 35'; Lewicki 71', 88'	Report	Kurzawa 87'

Örjans Vall, Halmstad
Attendance: 2,863
Referee: Ivan Kružliak (Slovakia)

Sweden won 4–3 on aggregate.
