= Kerger =

Kerger is a surname. Notable people with the surname include:

- Camille Kerger (born 1957), Luxembourgish composer, opera singer, and music teacher
- Kevin Kerger (born 1994), Luxembourgish footballer
- Paula Kerger (born 1957), American media executive

== See also ==
- Kerber (surname)
