= 2017 UEFA European Under-21 Championship qualification Group 6 =

Football tournament qualification stage

Group 6 of the 2017 UEFA European Under-21 Championship qualifying competition consisted of six teams: Spain, Sweden, Croatia, Georgia, Estonia, and San Marino. The composition of the nine groups in the qualifying group stage was decided by the draw held on 5 February 2015.

The group was played in home-and-away round-robin format. The group winners qualified directly for the final tournament, while the runners-up advanced to the play-offs if they were one of the four best runners-up among all nine groups (not counting results against the sixth-placed team).

== Standings ==
| Pos | Team | Pld | W | D | L | GF | GA | GD | Pts | Qualification | Sweden | Spain | Croatia | Georgia | Estonia | San Marino |
|---|---|---|---|---|---|---|---|---|---|---|---|---|---|---|---|---|
| 1 | Sweden | 10 | 7 | 3 | 0 | 24 | 7 | +17 | 24 | Final tournament | — | 1–1 | 4–2 | 3–2 | 5–0 | 3–0 |
| 2 | Spain | 10 | 7 | 2 | 1 | 31 | 9 | +22 | 23 | Play-offs | 1–1 | — | 0–3 | 5–0 | 5–0 | 6–0 |
| 3 | Croatia | 10 | 6 | 2 | 2 | 24 | 11 | +13 | 20 | | 1–1 | 2–3 | — | 1–0 | 2–1 | 4–0 |
| 4 | Georgia | 10 | 4 | 1 | 5 | 17 | 17 | 0 | 13 | | 0–1 | 2–5 | 2–2 | — | 3–0 | 4–0 |
| 5 | Estonia | 10 | 1 | 1 | 8 | 3 | 26 | −23 | 4 | | 0–3 | 0–2 | 0–4 | 0–1 | — | 0–0 |
| 6 | San Marino | 10 | 0 | 1 | 9 | 1 | 30 | −29 | 1 | | 0–2 | 0–3 | 0–3 | 0–3 | 1–2 | — |

Source: UEFA
Rules for classification: Qualification tiebreakers

== Matches ==
Times are CEST (UTC+2) for dates between 29 March and 24 October 2015 and between 27 March and 29 October 2016, for other dates times are CET (UTC+1).

3 June 2015
20:30

| San Marino | 0–3 | Georgia |
|---|---|---|
| | Report | Kacharava 44', 58'; Papunashvili 81' |

San Marino Stadium, Serravalle
Referee: Enea Jorgji (Albania)

16 June 2015
18:00

| Estonia | 0–0 | San Marino |
|---|---|---|
| | Report |

Haapsalu linnastaadion, Haapsalu
Referee: Dennis Antamo (Finland)

2 September 2015
18:45

| Estonia | 0–2 | Spain |
|---|---|---|
| | Report | Gayà 82'; Deulofeu 90+2' (pen.) |

A. Le Coq Arena, Tallinn
Referee: Mads-Kristoffer Kristoffersen (Denmark)

3 September 2015
16:00

| Croatia | 1–0 | Georgia |
|---|---|---|
| Milić 23' | Report |

Gradski stadion, Koprivnica
Referee: Svein-Erik Edvartsen (Norway)
3 September 2015
18:00

| Sweden | 3–0 | San Marino |
|---|---|---|
| Olsson 22'; Tanković 69'; Mrabti 87' | Report |

Strandvallen, Sölvesborg
Referee: Tim Marshall (Northern Ireland)

7 September 2015
18:00

| Estonia | 0–4 | Croatia |
|---|---|---|
| | Report | Milić 22'; Pašalić 35', 66' (pen.); Radošević 80' |

Tamme Stadium, Tartu
Referee: Bardhyl Pashaj (Albania)

7 October 2015
19:00

| Georgia | 2–5 | Spain |
|---|---|---|
| Tsintsadze 4'; Lobzhanidze 60' | Report | Munir 2', 73'; Asensio 62'; Mayoral 67'; Ceballos 90' |

Mikheil Meskhi Stadium, Tbilisi
Referee: Erez Papir (Israel)
7 October 2015
20:30

| San Marino | 0–3 | Croatia |
|---|---|---|
| | Report | Marić 7', 32'; Pašalić 12' |

San Marino Stadium, Serravalle
Referee: Tolga Özkalfa (Turkey)

9 October 2015
18:45

| Sweden | 5–0 | Estonia |
|---|---|---|
| Engvall 10', 31'; Hallberg 13'; Ayaz 81', 90+1' | Report |

Studenternas IP, Uppsala
Referee: Vilhjálmur Þórarinsson (Iceland)

13 October 2015
17:00

| Georgia | 3–0 | Estonia |
|---|---|---|
| Kakabadze 11'; Kacharava 20'; Kiteishvili 36' | Report |

Mikheil Meskhi Stadium, Tbilisi
Referee: Dejan Jakimovski (Macedonia)
13 October 2015
18:45

| Spain | 1–1 | Sweden |
|---|---|---|
| Óliver 20' | Report | Engvall 60' |

Heliodoro Rodríguez López, Santa Cruz de Tenerife
Referee: Daniel Siebert (Germany)

11 November 2015
17:00

| Croatia | 4–0 | San Marino |
|---|---|---|
| Man. Battistini 12' (o.g.); Milić 44'; Perić 47'; Pjaca 51' | Report |

Stadion Šubićevac, Šibenik
Referee: Orkhan Mammadov (Azerbaijan)
12 November 2015
18:45

| Spain | 5–0 | Georgia |
|---|---|---|
| Deulofeu 17', 33', 84'; Williams 56'; Ceballos 65' | Report |

Mediterráneo, Almería
Referee: Christos Nicolaides (Cyprus)

15 November 2015
16:00

| San Marino | 1–2 | Estonia |
|---|---|---|
| Cesarini 50' | Report | Käit 26'; Cesarini 48' (o.g.) |

San Marino Stadium, Serravalle
Referee: Sven Bindels (Luxembourg)

17 November 2015
11:00

| Georgia | 0–1 | Sweden |
|---|---|---|
| | Report | Mrabti 72' |

Tengiz Burjanadze Stadium, Gori
Referee: Benoît Millot (France)
17 November 2015
18:45

| Croatia | 2–3 | Spain |
|---|---|---|
| Pašalić 64'; Radošević 81' (pen.) | Report | Deulofeu 19' (pen.), 54'; Asensio 41' |

Stadion Rujevica, Rijeka
Referee: Serdar Gözübüyük (Netherlands)

23 March 2016
18:00

| Georgia | 4–0 | San Marino |
|---|---|---|
| Kharaishvili 10'; Kacharava 33' (pen.), 48'; Shengelia 81' | Report |

Mikheil Meskhi Stadium, Tbilisi
Referee: Alexandru Tean (Moldova)
24 March 2016
18:00

| Spain | 0–3 | Croatia |
|---|---|---|
| | Report | Ćaleta-Car 36'; Perica 42', 48' |

El Plantío, Burgos
Referee: Craig Pawson (England)

27 March 2016
19:30

| San Marino | 0–2 | Sweden |
|---|---|---|
| | Report | Fransson 37'; Sam. Gustafson 81' (pen.) |

San Marino Stadium, Serravalle
Referee: Yaroslav Kozyk (Ukraine)
28 March 2016
18:00

| Croatia | 2–1 | Estonia |
|---|---|---|
| Pavičić 5'; Perica 41' | Report | Kirss 53' |

Stadion ŠRC Zaprešić, Zaprešić
Referee: Dimitrios Massias (Cyprus)

3 June 2016
19:45

| Sweden | 3–2 | Georgia |
|---|---|---|
| Olsson 27' (pen.); Krafth 77'; Larsson 90+5' | Report | Arabuli 35'; Kiteishvili 89' |

Rimnersvallen, Uddevalla
Attendance: 2,200
Referee: Markus Hameter (Australia)

1 September 2016
18:00

| Croatia | 1–1 | Sweden |
|---|---|---|
| Perica 78' | Report | Cibicki 57' |

Gradski stadion, Koprivnica
Referee: Bastian Dankert (Germany)
1 September 2016
18:00

| Estonia | 0–1 | Georgia |
|---|---|---|
| | Report | Kacharava 39' |

A. Le Coq Arena, Tallinn
Referee: Rob Harvey (Republic of Ireland)
1 September 2016
18:45

| Spain | 6–0 | San Marino |
|---|---|---|
| González 14'; Munir 17', 36'; Mina 45', 84'; Williams 88' | Report |

Castàlia, Castellón de la Plana
Referee: Farrugia Cann Trustin (Malta)

5 September 2016
18:45

| Sweden | 1–1 | Spain |
|---|---|---|
| Merino 86' (o.g.) | Report | Deulofeu 50' |

Swedbank Stadion, Malmö
Referee: Hugo Miguel (Portugal)
6 September 2016
17:30

| Georgia | 2–2 | Croatia |
|---|---|---|
| Papunashvili 1'; Livaković 50' (o.g.) | Report | Perica 43', 61' |

David Abashidze Stadium, Zestaponi
Referee: Ivaylo Stoyanov (Bulgaria)

5 October 2016
19:30

| San Marino | 0–3 | Spain |
|---|---|---|
| | Report | Munir 16'; Denis Suárez 68'; Meré 79' |

San Marino Stadium, Serravalle
Referee: Martin Lundby (Norway)
6 October 2016
17:00

| Estonia | 0–3 | Sweden |
|---|---|---|
| | Report | Dagerstål 9'; Tanković 44'; Asoro 53' |

Pärnu Rannastaadion, Pärnu
Referee: Stephan Klossner (Switzerland)

10 October 2016
18:45

| Spain | 5–0 | Estonia |
|---|---|---|
| Denis Suárez 36'; Asensio 38', 90'; Munir 86', 90+3' | Report |

Pasarón, Pontevedra
Referee: Gunnar Jarl Jónsson (Iceland)
10 October 2016
18:45

| Sweden | 4–2 | Croatia |
|---|---|---|
| Wahlqvist 26' (pen.); Olsson 53'; Hallberg 58'; Strandberg 64' | Report | Perica 23'; Benković 67' |

Vångavallen, Trelleborg
Referee: Bartosz Frankowski (Poland)

== Goalscorers ==
7 goals

- (Croatia) Stipe Perica
- (Spain) Gerard Deulofeu
- (Spain) Munir

6 goals

- (Georgia (country)) Nika Kacharava

4 goals

- (Croatia) Mario Pašalić
- (Spain) Marco Asensio

3 goals

- (Croatia) Antonio Milić
- (Sweden) Gustav Engvall
- (Sweden) Kristoffer Olsson

2 goals

- (Croatia) Mirko Marić
- (Croatia) Josip Radošević
- (Georgia (country)) Otar Kiteishvili
- (Georgia (country)) Giorgi Papunashvili
- (Spain) Dani Ceballos
- (Spain) Santi Mina
- (Spain) Denis Suárez
- (Spain) Iñaki Williams
- (Sweden) Ferhad Ayaz
- (Sweden) Melker Hallberg
- (Sweden) Kerim Mrabti
- (Sweden) Muamer Tanković

1 goal

- (Croatia) Filip Benković
- (Croatia) Duje Ćaleta-Car
- (Croatia) Domagoj Pavičić
- (Croatia) Dino Perić
- (Croatia) Marko Pjaca
- (Estonia) Mattias Käit
- (Estonia) Robert Kirss
- (Georgia (country)) Bachana Arabuli
- (Georgia (country)) Otar Kakabadze
- (Georgia (country)) Giorgi Kharaishvili
- (Georgia (country)) Saba Lobzhanidze
- (Georgia (country)) Levan Shengelia
- (Georgia (country)) Mate Tsintsadze
- (Spain) José Gayà
- (Spain) Diego González
- (Spain) Borja Mayoral
- (Spain) Jorge Meré
- (Spain) Óliver Torres
- (San Marino) Davide Cesarini
- (Sweden) Joel Asoro
- (Sweden) Paweł Cibicki
- (Sweden) Filip Dagerstål
- (Sweden) Alexander Fransson
- (Sweden) Samuel Gustafson
- (Sweden) Emil Krafth
- (Sweden) Jordan Larsson
- (Sweden) Carlos Strandberg
- (Sweden) Linus Wahlqvist

1 own goal

- (Croatia) Dominik Livaković (against Georgia)
- (San Marino) Manuel Battistini (against Croatia)
- (San Marino) Davide Cesarini (against Estonia)
- (Spain) Mikel Merino (against Sweden)
