= 2017 UEFA European Under-21 Championship qualification Group 5 =

Football tournament qualification stage

Group 5 of the 2017 UEFA European Under-21 Championship qualifying competition consisted of six teams: Denmark, Romania, Armenia, Wales, Bulgaria, and Luxembourg. The composition of the nine groups in the qualifying group stage was decided by the draw held on 5 February 2015.

The group was played in home-and-away round-robin format. The group winners qualified directly for the final tournament, while the runners-up advanced to the play-offs if they were one of the four best runners-up among all nine groups (not counting results against the sixth-placed team).

== Standings ==
Pos	Team	Pld	W	D	L	GF	GA	GD	Pts	Qualification	Denmark	Bulgaria	Romania	Wales	Luxembourg	Armenia
1	Denmark	10	9	1	0	24	3	+21	28	Final tournament	—	1–0	3–1	0–0	4–1	2–0
2	Bulgaria	10	5	2	3	11	7	+4	17		0–3	—	2–0	0–0	3–0	2–0
3	Romania	10	5	1	4	15	14	+1	16		0–3	0–2	—	2–1	4–0	3–0
4	Wales	10	4	4	2	14	12	+2	16		0–4	3–1	1–1	—	1–1	2–1
5	Luxembourg	10	1	3	6	5	18	−13	6		0–1	0–0	0–1	1–3	—	1–0
6	Armenia	10	0	1	9	6	21	−15	1		1–3	0–1	2–3	1–3	1–1	—

Source: UEFA
Rules for classification: Qualification tiebreakers

== Matches ==
Times are CEST (UTC+2) for dates between 29 March and 24 October 2015 and between 27 March and 29 October 2016, for other dates times are CET (UTC+1).

31 March 2015
20:00

Wales	3–1	Bulgaria
O'Sullivan 9', 13'; Yorwerth 25'	Report	Kolev 51'

Cardiff City Stadium, Cardiff
Attendance: 1,175
Referee: Bart Vertenten (Belgium)

16 June 2015
19:00

Romania	3–0	Armenia
Pușcaș 16'; Păun 32'; Tănase 90+2'	Report

Stadionul Trans-Sil, Târgu Mureș
Attendance: 285
Referee: Srđan Jovanović (Serbia)

4 September 2015
18:30

Luxembourg	1–3	Wales
Sinani 90+2'	Report	Burns 35', 72'; Wilson 63'

Stade de la Frontière, Esch-sur-Alzette
Attendance: 323
Referee: Fábio Veríssimo (Portugal)
4 September 2015
18:45

Romania	0–2	Bulgaria
	Report	Minchev 16'; Kolev 89'

Stadionul Trans-Sil, Târgu Mureș
Attendance: 150
Referee: Yaroslav Kozyk (Ukraine)

8 September 2015
17:00

Armenia	2–3	Romania
Malakyan 47'; Simonyan 90+2'	Report	Păun 35', 38'; Pușcaș 60'

Football Academy Stadium, Yerevan
Attendance: 460
Referee: Manuel Schüttengruber (Austria)
8 September 2015
18:30

Bulgaria	3–0	Luxembourg
B. Tsonev 17'; Vutov 35'; Despodov 78'	Report

Ludogorets Arena, Razgrad
Attendance: 2,200
Referee: Sergejus Slyva (Lithuania)

9 October 2015
18:00

Bulgaria	2–0	Armenia
Malinov 68'; Minchev 81'	Report

Beroe Stadium, Stara Zagora
Attendance: 2,140
Referee: Christos Nicolaides (Cyprus)
9 October 2015
18:00

Luxembourg	0–1	Romania
	Report	Pușcaș 36'

Stade Municipal de la Ville de Differdange, Differdange
Attendance: 287
Referee: Eiko Saar (Estonia)
9 October 2015
18:45

Denmark	0–0	Wales
	Report

Nordjyske Arena, Aalborg
Attendance: 1,854
Referee: Juan Martínez Munuera (Spain)

13 October 2015
14:00

Armenia	1–1	Luxembourg
Shakhnazaryan 67'	Report	Pinto 23' (pen.)

Football Academy Stadium, Yerevan
Attendance: 300
Referee: Oleksandr Derdo (Ukraine)
13 October 2015
18:45

Denmark	1–0	Bulgaria
Hjulsager 71'	Report

Nordjyske Arena, Aalborg
Attendance: 2,877
Referee: Ádám Farkas (Hungary)

13 November 2015
15:00

Wales	2–1	Armenia
Harrison 9' (pen.); Wilson 90+1'	Report	Malakyan 59'

Nantporth, Bangor
Attendance: 362
Referee: Petur Reinert (Faroe Islands)
13 November 2015
18:45

Romania	0–3	Denmark
	Report	Børsting 8', 30'; Zohore 79'

Stadionul Marin Anastasovici, Giurgiu
Attendance: 1,250
Referee: Enea Jorgji (Albania)

17 November 2015
18:45

Denmark	2–0	Armenia
Banggaard 49'; Ingvartsen 82'	Report

Nordjyske Arena, Aalborg
Attendance: 1,547
Referee: Þóroddur Hjaltalín (Iceland)
17 November 2015
19:00

Wales	1–1	Romania
Burns 14'	Report	Nedelcearu 2'

Racecourse Ground, Wrexham
Attendance: 642
Referee: Mitja Žganec (Slovenia)

25 March 2016
17:30

Bulgaria	0–0	Wales
	Report

Beroe Stadium, Stara Zagora
Attendance: 1,560
Referee: Srđan Jovanović (Serbia)
25 March 2016
17:30

Luxembourg	0–1	Denmark
	Report	Nielsen 90'

Stade Municipal de la Ville de Differdange, Differdange
Attendance: 403
Referee: Aleksandrs Anufrijevs (Latvia)

29 March 2016
16:00

Armenia	1–3	Denmark
Malakyan 35' (pen.)	Report	Fischer 28'; Andersen 30'; Nielsen 90+2'

Vazgen Sargsyan Republican Stadium, Yerevan
Attendance: 700
Referee: Denis Scherbakov (Belarus)
29 March 2016
17:00

Romania	2–1	Wales
Hodorogea 37'; Ioniță 58'	Report	Charles 90+2'

Stadionul Gaz Metan, Mediaș
Attendance: 1,722
Referee: Tore Hansen (Norway)
29 March 2016
17:30

Luxembourg	0–0	Bulgaria
	Report

Stade rue Henri Dunant, Beggen
Attendance: 412
Referee: Bardhyl Pashaj (Albania)

2 September 2016
18:00

Wales	0–4	Denmark
	Report	Ingvartsen 21'; Sisto 40', 49'; Dolberg 83'

Racecourse Ground, Wrexham
Attendance: 668
Referee: Daniel Stefański (Poland)
2 September 2016
19:30

Romania	4–0	Luxembourg
Țîru 13'; Bumba 29'; Ioniţă 45'; Popescu 75'	Report

Stadionul Gaz Metan, Mediaș
Attendance: 1,957
Referee: Mario Zebec (Croatia)

6 September 2016
16:00

Armenia	0–1	Bulgaria
	Report	Nenov 79'

Football Academy Stadium, Yerevan
Attendance: 750
Referee: Anastasios Papapetrou (Greece)
6 September 2016
18:00

Wales	1–1	Luxembourg
Charles 90+1'	Report	Kerger 15'

Nantporth, Bangor
Attendance: 768
Referee: Vasilis Dimitriou (Cyprus)
6 September 2016
18:45

Denmark	3–1	Romania
Sisto 10'; Ingvartsen 35' (pen.), 39'	Report	Miron 68'

Nordjyske Arena, Aalborg
Attendance: 4,527
Referee: Davide Massa (Italy)

7 October 2016
16:30

Luxembourg	1–0	Armenia
Todorovic 83'	Report

Stade de la Frontière, Esch-sur-Alzette
Referee: Fyodor Zammit (Malta)
7 October 2016
17:00

Bulgaria	0–3	Denmark
	Report	Ingvartsen 13' (pen.), 28', 62'

Beroe Stadium, Stara Zagora
Referee: Orel Grinfeld (Israel)

11 October 2016
17:00

Armenia	1–3	Wales
Simonyan 69'	Report	Harrison 19'; Shakhnazaryan 69' (o.g.); O'Sullivan 90'

Football Academy Stadium, Yerevan
Referee: Alexander Harkam (Austria)
11 October 2016
17:00

Bulgaria	2–0	Romania
Tasev 16'; Georgiev 35'	Report

Beroe Stadium, Stara Zagora
Referee: Alper Ulusoy (Turkey)
11 October 2016
18:00

Denmark	4–1	Luxembourg
Ingvartsen 71'; Hjulsager 73'; Hansen 76'; Mahmutović 79' (o.g.)	Report	Borges 90+3'

Nordjyske Arena, Aalborg
Referee: Juri Frischer (Estonia)

== Goalscorers ==
8 goals

- (Denmark) Marcus Ingvartsen

3 goals

- (Armenia) Gor Malakyan
- (Denmark) Pione Sisto
- (Romania) Adrian Păun
- (Romania) George Pușcaș
- (Wales) Wes Burns
- (Wales) Tommy O'Sullivan

2 goals

- (Armenia) Artem Simonyan
- (Bulgaria) Nikola Kolev
- (Bulgaria) Georgi Minchev
- (Denmark) Frederik Børsting
- (Denmark) Andrew Hjulsager
- (Denmark) Casper Nielsen
- (Romania) Alexandru Ioniță
- (Wales) Jake Charles
- (Wales) Ellis Harrison
- (Wales) Harry Wilson

1 goal

- (Armenia) Aram Shakhnazaryan
- (Bulgaria) Kiril Despodov
- (Bulgaria) Aleksandar Georgiev
- (Bulgaria) Kristiyan Malinov
- (Bulgaria) Yuliyan Nenov
- (Bulgaria) Toni Tasev
- (Bulgaria) Borislav Tsonev
- (Bulgaria) Antonio Vutov
- (Denmark) Lucas Andersen
- (Denmark) Patrick Banggaard
- (Denmark) Kasper Dolberg
- (Denmark) Viktor Fischer
- (Denmark) Emiliano Hansen
- (Denmark) Kenneth Zohore
- (Luxembourg) Glenn Borges
- (Luxembourg) Kevin Kerger
- (Luxembourg) Ricardo Pinto
- (Luxembourg) Danel Sinani
- (Luxembourg) Milos Todorovic
- (Romania) Claudiu Bumba
- (Romania) Robert Hodorogea
- (Romania) George Miron
- (Romania) Ionuț Nedelcearu
- (Romania) Ovidiu Popescu
- (Romania) Florin Tănase
- (Romania) Bogdan Țîru
- (Wales) Josh Yorwerth

1 own goal

- (Armenia) Aram Shakhnazaryan (against Wales)
- (Luxembourg) Enes Mahmutović (against Denmark)
