= 2017 UEFA European Under-21 Championship qualification Group 1 =

Football tournament qualification stage

Group 1 of the 2017 UEFA European Under-21 Championship qualifying competition consisted of six teams: Czech Republic, Belgium, Montenegro, Moldova, Latvia, and Malta. The composition of the nine groups in the qualifying group stage was decided by the draw held on 5 February 2015.

The group was played in home-and-away round-robin format. The group winners qualified directly for the final tournament, while the runners-up advanced to the play-offs if they were one of the four best runners-up among all nine groups (not counting results against the sixth-placed team).

== Standings ==
Pos	Team	Pld	W	D	L	GF	GA	GD	Pts	Qualification	Czech Republic	Belgium	Montenegro	Malta	Latvia	Moldova
1	Czech Republic	10	7	2	1	29	10	+19	23	Final tournament	—	1–0	3–3	4–1	2–1	4–1
2	Belgium	10	6	0	4	14	11	+3	18		2–1	—	1–2	2–0	0–1	2–1
3	Montenegro	10	4	4	2	13	11	+2	16		0–3	3–0	—	0–0	3–3	1–0
4	Malta	10	3	2	5	9	20	−11	11		0–7	2–3	0–1	—	1–0	3–2
5	Latvia	10	2	3	5	10	13	−3	9		1–1	0–2	0–0	1–2	—	0–2
6	Moldova	10	2	1	7	8	18	−10	7		1–3	0–2	1–0	0–0	0–3	—

Source: UEFA
Rules for classification: Qualification tiebreakers

== Matches ==
Times are CEST (UTC+2) for dates between 29 March and 24 October 2015 and between 27 March and 29 October 2016, for other dates times are CET (UTC+1).

30 March 2015
20:00

Belgium	2–1	Moldova
Tielemans 14'; Castagne 45'	Report	Spătaru 50'

Den Dreef, Leuven
Referee: Paul Mclaughlin (Republic of Ireland)

11 June 2015
18:00

Moldova	0–0	Malta
	Report

Zimbru Stadium, Chișinău
Referee: Zaven Hovhannisyan (Armenia)

15 June 2015
20:30

Montenegro	1–0	Moldova
Savićević 40'	Report

Podgorica City Stadium, Podgorica
Referee: Orkhan Mammadov (Azerbaijan)
16 June 2015
17:30

Latvia	1–2	Malta
Stuglis 43'	Report	Camenzuli 55'; Montebello 78'

Daugava Stadium, Liepāja
Attendance: 1881
Referee: Jens Maae (Denmark)

4 September 2015
15:00

Moldova	1–0	Montenegro
Spătaru 31'	Report

CSR Orhei, Orhei
Referee: Laurent Kopriwa (Luxembourg)
4 September 2015
17:00

Latvia	0–2	Belgium
	Report	Kabasele 5'; Praet 18'

Olympic Sports Center of Zemgale, Jelgava
Attendance: 1088
Referee: Andrew Dallas (Scotland)
4 September 2015
18:00

Czech Republic	4–1	Malta
Schick 10', 21'; Čermák 40'; Hrubý 56'	Report	Montebello 37'

Stadion Střelnice, Jablonec nad Nisou
Referee: Rahim Hasanov (Azerbaijan)

8 September 2015
17:00

Latvia	1–1	Czech Republic
Šadčins 53'	Report	Klobása 85'

Olympic Sports Center of Zemgale, Jelgava
Attendance: 318
Referee: Roi Reinshreiber (Israel)
8 September 2015
18:30

Montenegro	0–0	Malta
	Report

Podgorica City Stadium, Podgorica
Referee: Charalambos Kalogeropoulos (Greece)

9 October 2015
18:45

Belgium	2–0	Malta
Tielemans 75' (pen.); De Sart 78'	Report

Den Dreef, Leuven
Referee: Fran Jović (Croatia)
11 October 2015
14:00

Moldova	0–3	Latvia
	Report	Klimaševičs 26'; Kazačoks 45' (pen.); Gutkovskis 54'

CSR Orhei, Orhei
Attendance: 300
Referee: Edin Jakupović (Bosnia and Herzegovina)
13 October 2015
18:00

Czech Republic	3–3	Montenegro
Havlík 42'; Čermák 44'; Černý 57'	Report	Raspopović 51'; Janković 65'; Jovović 81'

Městský fotbalový stadion Miroslava Valenty, Uherské Hradiště
Referee: John Beaton (Scotland)

12 November 2015
17:00

Czech Republic	1–0	Belgium
Schick 11'	Report

Stadion Střelnice, Jablonec nad Nisou
Referee: Ali Palabıyık (Turkey)
13 November 2015
17:00

Montenegro	3–3	Latvia
Đorđević 60', 69' (pen.); Savićević 85'	Report	Kazačoks 17', 52'; Gutkovskis 62'

Podgorica City Stadium, Podgorica
Attendance: 1300
Referee: Paul Mclaughlin (Republic of Ireland)

16 November 2015
13:00

Moldova	1–3	Czech Republic
Havel 13' (o.g.)	Report	Souček 37'; Rozgoniuc 53' (o.g.); Barák 81'

CSR Orhei, Orhei
Referee: Georgi Vadachkoria (Georgia)

23 March 2016
17:00

Moldova	0–2	Belgium
	Report	Heylen 72'; Kayembe 90+4'

Zimbru Stadium, Chișinău
Referee: Erez Papir (Israel)
23 March 2016
18:00

Malta	0–1	Montenegro
	Report	Kartal 18'

Hibernians Ground, Paola
Referee: Giorgi Kruashvili (Georgia)
25 March 2016
18:00

Czech Republic	2–1	Latvia
Schick 22', 48'	Report	Ikaunieks 33'

Městský fotbalový stadion Miroslava Valenty, Uherské Hradiště
Attendance: 3076
Referee: Ádám Farkas (Hungary)

28 March 2016
17:00

Belgium	1–2	Montenegro
Bongonda 45'	Report	Lagator 6'; Savićević 41'

Den Dreef, Leuven
Referee: Radu Petrescu (Romania)
29 March 2016
18:00

Malta	0–7	Czech Republic
	Report	Schick 20' (pen.), 42', 89'; Čermák 25', 75'; Černý 36'; Havel 57'

Ta' Qali National Stadium, Ta' Qali
Referee: Sergey Lapochkin (Russia)

1 September 2016
20:30

Montenegro	0–3	Czech Republic
	Report	Schick 6' (pen.), 9'; Čermák 16'

Podgorica City Stadium, Podgorica
Referee: Stephan Klossner (Switzerland)
2 September 2016
16:00

Latvia	0–2	Moldova
	Report	Zommers 65' (o.g.); Graur 90+1'

Olympic Sports Center of Zemgale, Jelgava
Attendance: 500
Referee: Alex Troleis (Faroe Islands)
2 September 2016
18:00

Malta	2–3	Belgium
Degabriele 74'; Heylen 84' (o.g.)	Report	Tielemans 3' (pen.); Bongonda 24'; Engels 90'

Hibernians Ground, Paola
Referee: Ola Hobber Nilsen (Norway)

6 September 2016
16:00

Latvia	0–0	Montenegro
	Report

Olympic Sports Center of Zemgale, Jelgava
Attendance: 316
Referee: Sergey Tsinkevich (Belarus)
6 September 2016
18:45

Belgium	2–1	Czech Republic
Praet 12'; Tielemans 88'	Report	Čermák 21'

Den Dreef, Leuven
Referee: Andreas Ekberg (Sweden)

7 October 2016
18:00

Czech Republic	4–1	Moldova
Jankto 45+1', 74'; Juliš 67'; Černý 77'	Report	Rebenja 90+2'

Městský stadion, Znojmo
Referee: Ivaylo Stoyanov (Bulgaria)
7 October 2016
18:00

Malta	1–0	Latvia
Grech 46'	Report

Hibernians Ground, Paola
Attendance: 213
Referee: Andrew Davey (Northern Ireland)
7 October 2016
19:00

Montenegro	3–0	Belgium
Jovović 17'; Boljević 26', 37'	Report

Gradski stadion, Nikšić
Referee: Hugo Miguel (Portugal)

11 October 2016
18:00

Malta	3–2	Moldova
J. Borg 40'; Camenzuli 45'; Mbong 67'	Report	Taras 53'; Svinarenco 65' (pen.)

Hibernians Ground, Paola
Referee: Stavros Mantalos (Greece)
11 October 2016
18:45

Belgium	0–1	Latvia
	Report	Černomordijs 88'

Den Dreef, Leuven
Attendance: 1720
Referee: Fedayi San (Switzerland)

== Goalscorers ==
10 goals

- (Czech Republic) Patrik Schick

6 goals

- (Czech Republic) Aleš Čermák

4 goals

- (Belgium) Youri Tielemans

3 goals

- (Czech Republic) Václav Černý
- (Latvia) Jevgēņijs Kazačoks
- (Montenegro) Vukan Savićević

2 goals

- (Belgium) Theo Bongonda
- (Belgium) Dennis Praet
- (Czech Republic) Jakub Jankto
- (Latvia) Vladislavs Gutkovskis
- (Malta) Ryan Camenzuli
- (Malta) Luke Montebello
- (Moldova) Dan Spătaru
- (Montenegro) Aleksandar Boljević
- (Montenegro) Luka Đorđević
- (Montenegro) Vladimir Jovović

1 goal

- (Belgium) Timothy Castagne
- (Belgium) Julien De Sart
- (Belgium) Björn Engels
- (Belgium) Michaël Heylen
- (Belgium) Nathan Kabasele
- (Belgium) Joris Kayembe
- (Czech Republic) Antonín Barák
- (Czech Republic) Milan Havel
- (Czech Republic) Marek Havlík
- (Czech Republic) Robert Hrubý
- (Czech Republic) Lukáš Juliš
- (Czech Republic) Stanislav Klobása
- (Czech Republic) Tomáš Souček
- (Latvia) Antonijs Černomordijs
- (Latvia) Dāvis Ikaunieks
- (Latvia) Dmitrijs Klimaševičs
- (Latvia) Ilja Šadčins
- (Latvia) Ingars Stuglis
- (Malta) Jean Borg
- (Malta) Jurgen Degabriele
- (Malta) Jake Grech
- (Malta) Joseph Mbong
- (Moldova) Dinu Graur
- (Moldova) Eugeniu Rebenja
- (Moldova) Serghei Svinarenco
- (Moldova) Dan Taras
- (Montenegro) Marko Janković
- (Montenegro) Nemanja Kartal
- (Montenegro) Dušan Lagator
- (Montenegro) Momcilo Raspopović

1 own goal

- (Belgium) Michaël Heylen (against Malta)
- (Czech Republic) Milan Havel (against Moldova)
- (Latvia) Kristaps Zommers (against Moldova)
- (Moldova) Artiom Rozgoniuc (against Czech Republic)
