= 2017 UEFA European Under-21 Championship qualification =

Tournament details
- Dates: 26 March 2015 – 15 November 2016
- Teams: 52 (from 1 confederation)

Tournament statistics
- Matches played: 254
- Goals scored: 713 (2.81 per match)
- Top scorer: (Czech Republic) Patrik Schick (10 goals)

The 2017 UEFA European Under-21 Championship qualifying competition was a men's under-21 football competition that determined the 11 teams joining the automatically qualified hosts Poland in the 2017 UEFA European Under-21 Championship tournament final.

A total of 52 UEFA member national teams entered the qualifying competition, with Gibraltar as the only absentee. Players born on or after 1 January 1994 are eligible to participate.

== Format ==
The qualifying competition consists of two rounds:

- Qualifying group stage: The 52 teams are drawn into nine groups – seven groups of six teams and two groups of five teams. Each group is played in home-and-away round-robin format. The nine group winners qualify directly for the tournament final, while the four best runners-up (not counting results against the sixth-placed team) advance to the play-offs.
- Play-offs: The four teams are drawn into two ties to play home-and-away two-legged matches to determine the last two qualified teams.

=== Tiebreakers ===
The teams are ranked according to points (3 points for a win, 1 point for a draw, 0 points for a loss). If two or more teams are equal on points on completion of a group, the following tie-breaking criteria are applied, in the order given, to determine the rankings (Regulations Article 14.01):

1. Higher number of points obtained in the group matches played among the teams in question;
2. Superior goal difference from the group matches played among the teams in question;
3. Higher number of goals scored in the group matches played among the teams in question;
4. Higher number of goals scored away from home in the group matches played among the teams in question;
5. If, after having applied criteria 1 to 4, teams still have an equal ranking, criteria 1 to 4 are reapplied exclusively to the group matches between the teams in question to determine their final rankings. If this procedure does not lead to a decision, criteria 6 to 10 apply;
6. Superior goal difference in all group matches;
7. Higher number of goals scored in all group matches;
8. Higher number of away goals scored in all group matches;
9. Lower disciplinary points total based only on yellow and red cards received in all group matches (red card = 3 points, yellow card = 1 point, expulsion for two yellow cards in one match = 3 points);
10. Position in the UEFA Under-21 national team coefficient ranking for the qualifying group stage draw.

To determine the four best runners-up from the qualifying group stage, the results against the teams in sixth place are discarded. The following criteria are applied (Regulations Article 14.02):

1. Higher number of points;
2. Superior goal difference;
3. Higher number of goals scored;
4. Higher number of away goals scored;
5. Lower disciplinary points total based only on yellow and red cards received (red card = 3 points, yellow card = 1 point, expulsion for two yellow cards in one match = 3 points);
6. Position in the UEFA Under-21 national team coefficient ranking for the qualifying group stage draw.

In the play-offs, the team that scores more goals on aggregate over the two legs qualifies for the tournament final. If the aggregate score is level, the away goals rule is applied, i.e., the team that scores more goals away from home over the two legs advances. If away goals are also equal, extra time is played. The away goals rule is again applied after extra time, i.e., if there are goals scored during extra time and the aggregate score is still level, the visiting team advances by virtue of more away goals scored. If no goals are scored during extra time, the tie is decided by penalty shoot-out (Regulations Articles 15.01 and 15.02).

== Schedule ==
The qualifying matches are played on dates that fall within the FIFA International Match Calendar.

Stage	FIFA International Dates
Qualifying group stage	23–31 March 2015
Qualifying group stage	8–16 June 2015
Qualifying group stage	31 August – 8 September 2015
Qualifying group stage	5–13 October 2015
Qualifying group stage	9–17 November 2015
Qualifying group stage	21–29 March 2016
Qualifying group stage	29 August – 6 September 2016
Qualifying group stage	3–11 October 2016
Play-offs	7–15 November 2016

== Qualifying group stage ==
=== Draw ===
The draw for the qualifying group stage was held on 5 February 2015, 09:00 CET (UTC+1), at the UEFA headquarters in Nyon, Switzerland.

The teams were seeded according to their coefficient ranking calculation based on the following:

- 2011 UEFA European Under-21 Championship tournament final and qualifying competition
- 2013 UEFA European Under-21 Championship tournament final and qualifying competition
- 2015 UEFA European Under-21 Championship qualifying competition

Groups 1–7 each contained one team from each of Pots A–F, and Group 8–9 each contained one team from each of Pots A–E. Precautions: certain national teams were not drawn up in the same group. Azerbaijan and Armenia continued to dispute the status of Nagorno-Karabakh, and Russia's continued 2014-15 intervention in Ukraine.

tournament final hosts
Team	Coeff	Rank
**Poland**	25,402	24

Teams entering qualifying group stage

Pot A
Team	Coeff	Rank
**Spain**	41,470	1
**England**	36,252	2
**Italy**	36,129	3
**Germany**	35,370	4
France	35,107	5
**Czech Republic**	34,516	6
**Portugal**	33,887	7
Netherlands	33,422	8
**Denmark**	31,989	9

Pot D
Team	Coeff	Rank
Finland	23,851	29
Wales	23,818	30
Hungary	23,776	31
Iceland	23,521	32
Bosnia and Herzegovina	22,912	33
Georgia	22,606	34
Moldova	22,431	35
Republic of Ireland	21,936	36
Belarus	20,638	37

Pot B
Team	Coeff	Rank
Russia	31,346	10
Switzerland	31,296	11
**Sweden**	30,365	12
**Serbia**	29,837	13
Israel	29,766	14
Ukraine	28,950	15
**Slovakia**	27,982	16
Romania	27,668	17
Belgium	27,539	18

Pot E
Team	Coeff	Rank
Bulgaria	20,317	38
Cyprus	18,809	39
**Macedonia**	18,126	40
Lithuania	17,511	41
Azerbaijan	17,414	42
Kazakhstan	17,076	43
Albania	16,014	44
Latvia	15,836	45
Estonia	15,726	46

Pot C
Team	Coeff	Rank
Turkey	27,497	19
Slovenia	27,252	20
Austria	27,177	21
Greece	26,982	22
Scotland	25,812	23
Croatia	25,286	25
Norway	24,859	26
Armenia	24,441	27
Montenegro	24,402	28

Pot F
Team	Coeff	Rank
Faroe Islands	14,896	47
Northern Ireland	14,651	48
Luxembourg	11,251	49
Malta	10,838	50
San Marino	10,163	51
Andorra	8,950	52
Liechtenstein	8,125	53

Notes

- Teams marked in **bold** have qualified for the tournament final.

Did not enter
Team	Coeff	Rank
Gibraltar	0	54

=== Groups ===
The nine group winners qualified directly for the tournament final.
The four best group runners-up (not counting results against sixth-placed team) advanced to the play-offs.

==== Group 1 ====
Pos	Team	Pld	W	D	L	GF	GA	GD	Pts	Qualification	Czech Republic	Belgium	Montenegro	Malta	Latvia	Moldova
1	Czech Republic	10	7	2	1	29	10	+19	23	Final tournament	—	1–0	3–3	4–1	2–1	4–1
2	Belgium	10	6	0	4	14	11	+3	18		2–1	—	1–2	2–0	0–1	2–1
3	Montenegro	10	4	4	2	13	11	+2	16		0–3	3–0	—	0–0	3–3	1–0
4	Malta	10	3	2	5	9	20	−11	11		0–7	2–3	0–1	—	1–0	3–2
5	Latvia	10	2	3	5	10	13	−3	9		1–1	0–2	0–0	1–2	—	0–2
6	Moldova	10	2	1	7	8	18	−10	7		1–3	0–2	1–0	0–0	0–3	—

Source: UEFA

==== Group 2 ====
Pos	Team	Pld	W	D	L	GF	GA	GD	Pts	Qualification	Italy	Serbia	Slovenia	Ireland	Lithuania	Andorra
1	Italy	10	7	3	0	17	3	+14	24	Final tournament	—	1–1	1–0	1–0	2–0	3–0
2	Serbia	10	7	2	1	27	8	+19	23	Play-offs	1–1	—	3–1	3–2	5–0	5–0
3	Slovenia	10	5	0	5	18	11	+7	15		0–3	2–0	—	3–1	3–0	4–0
4	Republic of Ireland	10	4	0	6	14	17	−3	12		1–4	1–3	2–0	—	3–0	1–0
5	Lithuania	10	3	1	6	5	17	−12	10		0–0	0–2	1–0	3–1	—	1–0
6	Andorra	10	1	0	9	1	26	−25	3		0–1	0–4	0–5	0–2	1–0	—

Source: UEFA

==== Group 3 ====
Pos	Team	Pld	W	D	L	GF	GA	GD	Pts	Qualification	North Macedonia	France	Iceland	Ukraine	Scotland	
1	Macedonia	10	6	3	1	13	7	+6	21	Final tournament	—	2–2	0–0	1–0	2–0	2–0
2	France	10	6	2	2	17	8	+9	20		1–1	—	2–0	2–0	2–0	1–0
3	Iceland	10	5	3	2	13	9	+4	18		3–0	3–2	—	2–4	2–0	1–1
4	Ukraine	10	4	2	4	14	12	+2	14		0–2	1–0	0–1	—	4–0	1–1
5	Scotland	10	2	2	6	8	17	−9	8		0–1	1–2	0–0	2–2	—	3–1
6	Northern Ireland	10	0	2	8	6	18	−12	2		1–2	0–3	0–1	1–2	1–2	—

Source: UEFA

==== Group 4 ====
Pos	Team	Pld	W	D	L	GF	GA	GD	Pts	Qualification	Portugal	Israel	Greece	Albania	Hungary	Liechtenstein
1	Portugal	10	8	2	0	34	5	+29	26	Final tournament	—	0–0	1–0	4–0	2–0	4–0
2	Israel	10	6	3	1	21	4	+17	21		0–3	—	4–0	4–0	3–0	4–0
3	Greece	10	4	1	5	13	14	−1	13		0–4	0–1	—	2–1	3–1	5–0
4	Albania	10	3	3	4	11	20	−9	12		1–6	1–1	0–0	—	2–1	2–0
5	Hungary	10	3	3	4	19	16	+3	12		3–3	0–0	2–1	2–2	—	4–0
6	Liechtenstein	10	0	0	10	1	40	−39	0		1–7	0–4	0–2	0–2	0–6	—

Source: UEFA

==== Group 5 ====
Pos	Team	Pld	W	D	L	GF	GA	GD	Pts	Qualification	Denmark	Bulgaria	Romania	Wales	Luxembourg	Armenia
1	Denmark	10	9	1	0	24	3	+21	28	Final tournament	—	1–0	3–1	0–0	4–1	2–0
2	Bulgaria	10	5	2	3	11	7	+4	17		0–3	—	2–0	0–0	3–0	2–0
3	Romania	10	5	1	4	15	14	+1	16		0–3	0–2	—	2–1	4–0	3–0
4	Wales	10	4	4	2	14	12	+2	16		0–4	3–1	1–1	—	1–1	2–1
5	Luxembourg	10	1	3	6	5	18	−13	6		0–1	0–0	0–1	1–3	—	1–0
6	Armenia	10	0	1	9	6	21	−15	1		1–3	0–1	2–3	1–3	1–1	—

Source: UEFA

==== Group 6 ====
Pos	Team	Pld	W	D	L	GF	GA	GD	Pts	Qualification	Sweden	Spain	Croatia	Georgia	Estonia	San Marino
1	Sweden	10	7	3	0	24	7	+17	24	Final tournament	—	1–1	4–2	3–2	5–0	3–0
2	Spain	10	7	2	1	31	9	+22	23	Play-offs	1–1	—	0–3	5–0	5–0	6–0
3	Croatia	10	6	2	2	24	11	+13	20		1–1	2–3	—	1–0	2–1	4–0
4	Georgia	10	4	1	5	17	17	0	13		0–1	2–5	2–2	—	3–0	4–0
5	Estonia	10	1	1	8	3	26	−23	4		0–3	0–2	0–4	0–1	—	0–0
6	San Marino	10	0	1	9	1	30	−29	1		0–2	0–3	0–3	0–3	1–2	—

Source: UEFA

==== Group 7 ====
Pos	Team	Pld	W	D	L	GF	GA	GD	Pts	Qualification	Germany	Austria	Finland	Azerbaijan	Russia	Faroe Islands
1	Germany	10	10	0	0	35	8	+27	30	Final tournament	—	4–2	4–0	3–1	4–3	4–1
2	Austria	10	7	1	2	22	12	+10	22	Play-offs	1–4	—	2–0	7–0	4–3	1–0
3	Finland	10	4	2	4	13	10	+3	14		0–1	0–1	—	0–0	2–0	3–0
4	Azerbaijan	10	2	3	5	8	19	−11	9		0–3	0–2	0–1	—	3–0	1–1
5	Russia	10	2	3	5	15	19	−4	9		0–2	1–1	1–1	2–2	—	2–0
6	Faroe Islands	10	0	1	9	3	28	−25	1		0–6	0–1	1–6	0–1	0–3	—

Source: UEFA

==== Group 8 ====
Pos	Team	Pld	W	D	L	GF	GA	GD	Pts	Qualification	Slovakia	Netherlands	Turkey	Belarus	Cyprus
1	Slovakia	8	6	1	1	21	6	+15	**19**	Final tournament	—	4–2	5–0	3–1	2–0
2	Netherlands	8	4	2	2	15	10	+5	**14**		1–3	—	0–0	1–0	4–0
3	Turkey	8	3	2	3	7	8	−1	**11**		1–1	0–1	—	1–0	0–1
4	Belarus	8	2	2	4	7	11	−4	**8**		1–0	2–2	0–2	—	2–2
5	Cyprus	8	1	1	6	4	19	−15	**4**		0–3	1–4	0–3	0–1	—

Source: UEFA

==== Group 9 ====
Pos	Team	Pld	W	D	L	GF	GA	GD	Pts	Qualification	England	Norway	Switzerland	Kazakhstan	Bosnia and Herzegovina
1	England	8	6	2	0	20	3	+17	**20**	Final tournament	—	6–1	3–1	3–0	5–0
2	Norway	8	5	1	2	12	10	+2	**16**	Play-offs	0–1	—	2–1	2–1	2–0
3	Switzerland	8	3	3	2	11	8	+3	**12**		1–1	1–1	—	3–0	3–1
4	Kazakhstan	8	1	1	6	3	14	−11	**4**		0–1	0–3	0–1	—	0–0
5	Bosnia and Herzegovina	8	0	3	5	2	13	−11	**3**		0–0	0–1	0–0	1–2	—

Source: UEFA

=== Ranking of second-placed teams ===
To determine the four best second-placed teams from the qualifying group stage which advance to the play-offs, only the results of the second-placed teams against the first, third, fourth and fifth-placed teams in their group are taken into account, while results against the sixth-placed team (for groups with six teams) are not included. As a result, eight matches played by each second-placed team will count for the purposes of determining the ranking.

Pos	Grp	Team	Pld	W	D	L	GF	GA	GD	Pts	Qualification
1	6	Spain	8	5	2	1	22	9	+13	17	Play-offs
2	2	Serbia	8	5	2	1	18	8	+10	17	Play-offs
3	7	Austria	8	5	1	2	20	12	+8	16	Play-offs
4	9	Norway	8	5	1	2	12	10	+2	16	Play-offs
5	4	Israel	8	4	3	1	13	4	+9	15	
6	8	Netherlands	8	4	2	2	15	10	+5	14	
7	3	France	8	4	2	2	13	8	+5	14	
8	1	Belgium	8	4	0	4	10	10	0	12	
9	5	Bulgaria	8	3	2	3	8	7	+1	11	

Source: UEFA
Rules for classification: 1) points; 2) goal difference; 3) goals scored; 4) away goals scored; 5) disciplinary points; 6) coefficient.

== Play-offs ==
=== Draw ===
The draw for the play-offs was held on 14 October 2016, 13:00 CEST (UTC+2), at the UEFA headquarters in Nyon, Switzerland.

=== Matches ===
The two play-off winners qualify for the tournament final.

Team 1	Agg.	Team 2	1st leg	2nd leg
Serbia	2–1	Norway	2–0	0–1
Austria	1–1 (a)	Spain	1–1	0–0

== Qualified teams ==
The following 12 teams qualify for the tournament final.

Team	Qualified as	Qualified on	Previous appearances in tournament^{1} only U-21 era (since 1978)
Poland	Hosts	26 January 2015	5 (1982, 1984, 1986, 1992, 1994)
Czech Republic	Group 1 winners	7 October 2016	12 (1978^{2}, 1980^{2}, 1988^{2}, 1990^{2}, 1992^{2}, 1994^{2}, 1996, 2000, **2002**, 2007, 2011, 2015)
Italy	Group 2 winners	11 October 2016	18 (1978, 1980, 1982, 1984, 1986, 1988, 1990, **1992**, **1994**, **1996**, **2000**, 2002, **2004**, 2006, 2007, 2009, 2013, 2015)
Macedonia	Group 3 winners	11 October 2016	0 (debut)
Portugal	Group 4 winners	6 September 2016	7 (1994, 1996, 2002, 2004, 2006, 2007, 2015)
Denmark	Group 5 winners	6 September 2016	6 (1978, 1986, 1992, 2006, 2011, 2015)
Sweden	Group 6 winners	10 October 2016	7 (1986, 1990, 1992, 1998, 2004, 2009, **2015**)
Germany	Group 7 winners	7 October 2016	10 (1982^{3}, 1990^{3}, 1992, 1996, 1998, 2004, 2006, **2009**, 2013, 2015)
Slovakia	Group 8 winners	6 October 2016	7 (1978^{2}, 1980^{2}, 1988^{2}, 1990^{2}, 1992^{2}, 1994^{2}, 2000)
England	Group 9 winners	6 October 2016	13 (1978, 1980, **1982**, **1984**, 1986, 1988, 2000, 2002, 2007, 2009, 2011, 2013, 2015)
Serbia	Play-off winners	15 November 2016	9 (**1978**^{4}, 1980^{4}, 1984^{4}, 1990^{4}, 2004^{5}, 2006^{5}, 2007, 2009, 2015)
Spain	Play-off winners	15 November 2016	12 (1982, 1984, **1986**, 1988, 1990, 1994, 1996, **1998**, 2000, 2009, **2011**, **2013**)

^{1} Bold indicates champion for that year. Italic indicates host for that year.
^{2} As Czechoslovakia
^{3} As West Germany
^{4} As Yugoslavia
^{5} As Serbia and Montenegro

== Top goalscorers ==
Players with six goals or more.

10 goals

- (Czech Republic) Patrik Schick

9 goals

- (Austria) Michael Gregoritsch
- (Serbia) Uroš Đurđević

8 goals

- (Denmark) Marcus Ingvartsen
- (Spain) Gerard Deulofeu

7 goals

- (Croatia) Stipe Perica
- (Germany) Davie Selke
- (Spain) Munir

6 goals

- (Czech Republic) Aleš Čermák
- (Georgia (country)) Nika Kacharava
- (Netherlands) Vincent Janssen
