= 2017 UEFA European Under-21 Championship qualification Group 2 =

Football tournament qualification stage

Group 2 of the 2017 UEFA European Under-21 Championship qualifying competition consisted of six teams: Italy, Serbia, Slovenia, Republic of Ireland, Lithuania, and Andorra. The composition of the nine groups in the qualifying group stage was decided by the draw held on 5 February 2015.

The group was played in home-and-away round-robin format. The group winners qualified directly for the final tournament, while the runners-up advanced to the play-offs if they were one of the four best runners-up among all nine groups (not counting results against the sixth-placed team).

== Standings ==
Pos	Team	Pld	W	D	L	GF	GA	GD	Pts	Qualification	Italy	Serbia	Slovenia	Ireland	Lithuania	Andorra
1	Italy	10	7	3	0	17	3	+14	24	Final tournament	—	1–1	1–0	1–0	2–0	3–0
2	Serbia	10	7	2	1	27	8	+19	23	Play-offs	1–1	—	3–1	3–2	5–0	5–0
3	Slovenia	10	5	0	5	18	11	+7	15		0–3	2–0	—	3–1	3–0	4–0
4	Republic of Ireland	10	4	0	6	14	17	−3	12		1–4	1–3	2–0	—	3–0	1–0
5	Lithuania	10	3	1	6	5	17	−12	10		0–0	0–2	1–0	3–1	—	1–0
6	Andorra	10	1	0	9	1	26	−25	3		0–1	0–4	0–5	0–2	1–0	—

Source: UEFA
Rules for classification: Qualification tiebreakers

== Matches ==
Times are CEST (UTC+2) for dates between 29 March and 24 October 2015 and between 27 March and 29 October 2016, for other dates times are CET (UTC+1).

26 March 2015
20:45

Republic of Ireland	1–0	Andorra
Connolly 31'	Report

Waterford Regional Sports Centre, Waterford
Referee: Tsvetan Krastev (Bulgaria)

8 June 2015
17:30

Slovenia	4–0	Andorra
Šporar 14'; Kastrevec 21'; Zahović 29'; Stankovič 74'	Report

Ajdovščina Stadium, Ajdovščina
Referee: Alexandr Aliyev (Kazakhstan)

16 June 2015
18:00

Andorra	1–0	Lithuania
A. Sánchez 51' (pen.)	Report

Estadi Comunal, Andorra la Vella
Referee: Alain Durieux (Luxembourg)

4 September 2015
18:30

Slovenia	3–0	Lithuania
Hotić 31'; Šporar 65'; Štulac 81'	Report

Arena Petrol, Celje
Referee: Suren Baliyan (Armenia)

8 September 2015
17:00

Andorra	0–2	Republic of Ireland
	Report	Hoban 13'; Cullen 21'

Estadi Comunal, Andorra la Vella
Referee: Irfan Peljto (Bosnia and Herzegovina)
8 September 2015
17:00

Italy	1–0	Slovenia
Bernardeschi 51' (pen.)	Report

Mapei Stadium, Reggio Emilia
Referee: Sandro Schärer (Switzerland)
8 September 2015
18:30

Serbia	5–0	Lithuania
Đurđević 29', 36' (pen.); Milinković-Savić 44', 75'; Ožegović 49'	Report

Metalac Stadium, Gornji Milanovac
Referee: Dimitrios Massias (Cyprus)

7 October 2015
18:00

Serbia	5–0	Andorra
Luković 9', 52'; Ožegović 38' (pen.), 47'; Mulić 64'	Report

Karađorđe Stadium, Novi Sad
Referee: Vladimir Vnuk (Slovakia)
8 October 2015
18:30

Slovenia	0–3	Italy
	Report	Monachello 71', 84'; Benassi 87'

Bonifika Stadium, Koper
Referee: Bartosz Frankowski (Poland)
9 October 2015
18:45

Republic of Ireland	3–0	Lithuania
O'Dowda 27'; Wilkinson 30'; Browne 77'	Report

Waterford Regional Sports Centre, Waterford
Referee: Johnny Casanova (San Marino)

13 October 2015
17:00

Italy	1–0	Republic of Ireland
Parigini 66'	Report

Stadio Romeo Menti, Vicenza
Referee: Aliyar Aghayev (Azerbaijan)
13 October 2015
17:30

Lithuania	0–2	Serbia
	Report	Čavrić 19', 44'

Darius and Girėnas Stadium, Kaunas
Referee: Mikhail Vilkov (Russia)
13 October 2015
18:30

Andorra	0–5	Slovenia
	Report	Gorenc Stankovič 6'; Štulac 48', 52'; Kastrevec 55', 81'

Estadi Comunal, Andorra la Vella
Referee: Bryn Markham-Jones (Wales)

13 November 2015
17:30

Lithuania	3–1	Republic of Ireland
Spalvis 22'; Stankevičius 45'; Kazlauskas 73'	Report	Wilkinson 44'

LFF Stadium, Vilnius
Referee: Petr Ardeleánu (Czech Republic)
13 November 2015
18:30

Serbia	1–1	Italy
Milinković-Savić 47'	Report	Cataldi 56'

Karađorđe Stadium, Novi Sad
Referee: Marius Avram (Romania)

17 November 2015
16:30

Slovenia	2–0	Serbia
Šporar 61'; Hotić 83'	Report

Bonifika Stadium, Koper
Referee: Fábio Veríssimo (Portugal)
17 November 2015
17:00

Italy	2–0	Lithuania
Berardi 2'; Benassi 24'	Report

Stadio Teofilo Patini, Castel di Sangro
Referee: Roi Reinshreiber (Israel)

24 March 2016
19:00

Republic of Ireland	1–4	Italy
Mandragora 17' (o.g.)	Report	Benassi 28'; Rosseti 36'; Romagnoli 59'; Lenihan 82' (o.g.)

Waterford Regional Sports Centre, Waterford
Referee: Bart Vertenten (Belgium)
25 March 2016
16:00

Andorra	0–4	Serbia
	Report	Babić 29'; Đurđević 40'; Ožegović 59' (pen.); Maraš 87'

Estadi Comunal, Andorra la Vella
Referee: Dennis Antamo (Finland)

28 March 2016
18:00

Slovenia	3–1	Republic of Ireland
Krajnc 14'; Bajde 55' (pen.); Zajc 72'	Report	O'Dowda 65'

Bonifika Stadium, Koper
Referee: Andris Treimanis (Latvia)
29 March 2016
18:30

Andorra	0–1	Italy
	Report	Cerri 79'

Estadi Comunal, Andorra la Vella
Referee: Tim Marshall (Northern Ireland)

1 September 2016
17:30

Lithuania	1–0	Andorra
Sirgėdas 34'	Report

LFF Stadium, Vilnius
Referee: Ferenc Karakó (Hungary)
2 September 2016
18:30

Italy	1–1	Serbia
Cerri 54' (pen.)	Report	Gajić 33'

Stadio Romeo Menti, Vicenza
Referee: Carlos del Cerro Grande (Spain)
2 September 2016
20:30

Republic of Ireland	2–0	Slovenia
Charsley 87'; Maguire 90+1'	Report

Waterford Regional Sports Centre, Waterford
Referee: Þorvaldur Árnason (Iceland)

6 September 2016
18:00

Serbia	3–2	Republic of Ireland
Đurđević 12', 72' (pen.); Lazić 65'	Report	O'Dowda 69'; Maguire 81'

Karađorđe Stadium, Novi Sad
Referee: Orel Grinfeld (Israel)
6 September 2016
18:30

Italy	3–0	Andorra
Di Francesco 48', 73'; Pellegrini 88'	Report

Stadio Alberto Picco, La Spezia
Referee: Aleksandrs Golubevs (Latvia)

7 October 2016
17:30

Lithuania	1–0	Slovenia
Ruzgis 72'	Report

Darius and Girėnas Stadium, Kaunas
Referee: Glenn Nyberg (Sweden)
7 October 2016
18:45

Republic of Ireland	1–3	Serbia
Duffus 49'	Report	Mihajlović 64'; Gaćinović 67'; Lukić 88'

Waterford Regional Sports Centre, Waterford
Referee: Kirill Levnikov (Russia)

11 October 2016
17:00

Lithuania	0–0	Italy
	Report

Darius and Girėnas Stadium, Kaunas
Referee: Andris Treimanis (Latvia)
11 October 2016
17:00

Serbia	3–1	Slovenia
Đurđević 8', 25' (pen.), 86'	Report	Lotrič 19'

Metalac Stadium, Gornji Milanovac
Referee: Mete Kalkavan (Turkey)

== Goalscorers ==
8 goals

- (Serbia) Uroš Đurđević

4 goals

- (Serbia) Ognjen Ožegović

3 goals

- (Italy) Marco Benassi
- (Republic of Ireland) Callum O'Dowda
- (Serbia) Sergej Milinković-Savić
- (Slovenia) Žiga Kastrevec
- (Slovenia) Andraž Šporar
- (Slovenia) Leo Štulac

2 goals

- (Italy) Alberto Cerri
- (Italy) Federico Di Francesco
- (Italy) Gaetano Monachello
- (Republic of Ireland) Sean Maguire
- (Republic of Ireland) Conor Wilkinson
- (Serbia) Aleksandar Čavrić
- (Serbia) Andrija Luković
- (Slovenia) Jon Gorenc Stanković
- (Slovenia) Dino Hotić

1 goal

- (Andorra) Aarón Sánchez
- (Italy) Domenico Berardi
- (Italy) Federico Bernardeschi
- (Italy) Danilo Cataldi
- (Italy) Vittorio Parigini
- (Italy) Lorenzo Pellegrini
- (Italy) Alessio Romagnoli
- (Italy) Lorenzo Rosseti
- (Lithuania) Donatas Kazlauskas
- (Lithuania) Manfredas Ruzgis
- (Lithuania) Gratas Sirgėdas
- (Lithuania) Lukas Spalvis
- (Lithuania) Simonas Stankevičius
- (Republic of Ireland) Alan Browne
- (Republic of Ireland) Harry Charsley
- (Republic of Ireland) Dylan Connolly
- (Republic of Ireland) Josh Cullen
- (Republic of Ireland) Courtney Duffus
- (Republic of Ireland) Tommie Hoban
- (Serbia) Srđan Babić
- (Serbia) Mijat Gaćinović
- (Serbia) Milan Gajić
- (Serbia) Darko Lazić
- (Serbia) Saša Lukić
- (Serbia) Nikola Maraš
- (Serbia) Nemanja Mihajlović
- (Serbia) Fejsal Mulić
- (Slovenia) Gregor Bajde
- (Slovenia) Luka Krajnc
- (Slovenia) Mitja Lotrič
- (Slovenia) Luka Zahović
- (Slovenia) Miha Zajc

1 own goal

- (Italy) Rolando Mandragora (against Republic of Ireland)
- (Republic of Ireland) Darragh Lenihan (against Italy)
