= 2017 UEFA European Under-21 Championship qualification play-offs =

Football tournament qualification play-offs

The play-offs of the 2017 UEFA European Under-21 Championship qualifying competition involve the four runners-up with the best records among all nine groups in the qualifying group stage: Austria, Norway, Serbia, and Spain. The draw for the play-offs was held on 14 October 2016.

The play-offs are played in home-and-away two-legged format. The two play-off winners qualify for the final tournament.

== Ranking of second-placed teams ==
To determine the four best second-placed teams from the qualifying group stage which advance to the play-offs, only the results of the second-placed teams against the first, third, fourth and fifth-placed teams in their group are taken into account, while results against the sixth-placed team (for groups with six teams) are not included. As a result, eight matches played by each second-placed team will count for the purposes of determining the ranking.

Pos	Grp	Team	Pld	W	D	L	GF	GA	GD	Pts	Qualification
1	6	Spain	8	5	2	1	22	9	+13	17	Play-offs
2	2	Serbia	8	5	2	1	18	8	+10	17	Play-offs
3	7	Austria	8	5	1	2	20	12	+8	16	Play-offs
4	9	Norway	8	5	1	2	12	10	+2	16	Play-offs
5	4	Israel	8	4	3	1	13	4	+9	15	
6	8	Netherlands	8	4	2	2	15	10	+5	14	
7	3	France	8	4	2	2	13	8	+5	14	
8	1	Belgium	8	4	0	4	10	10	0	12	
9	5	Bulgaria	8	3	2	3	8	7	+1	11	

Source: UEFA
Rules for classification: 1) points; 2) goal difference; 3) goals scored; 4) away goals scored; 5) disciplinary points; 6) coefficient.

== Matches ==
All times are CET (UTC+1).

Team 1	Agg.	Team 2	1st leg	2nd leg
Serbia	2–1	Norway	2–0	0–1
Austria	1–1 (a)	Spain	1–1	0–0

11 November 2016
18:00

Serbia	2–0	Norway
Đurđević 6'; Haraldseid 69' (o.g.)	Report

Partizan Stadium, Belgrade
Attendance: 8,450
Referee: Michael Oliver (England)
15 November 2016
19:00

Norway	1–0	Serbia
Elyounoussi 70'	Report

Marienlyst Stadion, Drammen
Attendance: 4,838
Referee: Ivan Kružliak (Slovakia)

Serbia qualified for the final tournament.

11 November 2016
18:30

Austria	1–1	Spain
Castro 61' (o.g.)	Report	Deulofeu 45+2' (pen.)

NV Arena, Sankt Pölten
Attendance: 1,503
Referee: Benoît Bastien (France)
15 November 2016
18:00

Spain	0–0	Austria
	Report

Estadio Carlos Belmonte, Albacete
Attendance: 12,500
Referee: Serdar Gözübüyük (Netherlands)

Spain qualified for the final tournament.
