= 2017 UEFA European Under-21 Championship qualification Group 8 =

Football tournament qualification stage

Group 8 of the 2017 UEFA European Under-21 Championship qualifying competition consisted of five teams: Netherlands, Slovakia, Turkey, Belarus, and Cyprus. The composition of the nine groups in the qualifying group stage was decided by the draw held on 5 February 2015.

The group was played in home-and-away round-robin format. The group winners qualified directly for the final tournament, while the runners-up advanced to the play-offs if they were one of the four best runners-up among all nine groups (not counting results against the sixth-placed team).

== Standings ==
Pos	Team	Pld	W	D	L	GF	GA	GD	Pts	Qualification	Slovakia	Netherlands	Turkey	Belarus	Cyprus
1	Slovakia	8	6	1	1	21	6	+15	19	Final tournament	—	4–2	5–0	3–1	2–0
2	Netherlands	8	4	2	2	15	10	+5	14		1–3	—	0–0	1–0	4–0
3	Turkey	8	3	2	3	7	8	−1	11		1–1	0–1	—	1–0	0–1
4	Belarus	8	2	2	4	7	11	−4	8		1–0	2–2	0–2	—	2–2
5	Cyprus	8	1	1	6	4	19	−15	4		0–3	1–4	0–3	0–1	—

Source: UEFA
Rules for classification: Qualification tiebreakers

== Matches ==
Times are CEST (UTC+2) for dates between 29 March and 24 October 2015 and between 27 March and 29 October 2016, for other dates times are CET (UTC+1).

4 September 2015
18:30

Netherlands	4–0	Cyprus
Hateboer 4'; Janssen 23', 66'; Bazoer 53'	Report

De Adelaarshorst, Deventer
Attendance: 6,856
Referee: Thorvaldur Árnason (Iceland)
6 September 2015
15:00

Belarus	1–0	Slovakia
Yarotsky 39'	Report

City Stadium, Slutsk
Attendance: 1,100
Referee: Danilo Grujić (Serbia)

8 September 2015
18:45

Turkey	0–1	Netherlands
	Report	Boëtius 35'

Recep Tayyip Erdoğan Stadium, Istanbul
Attendance: 300
Referee: Davide Massa (Italy)

8 October 2015
17:20

Slovakia	2–0	Cyprus
Mihalík 62'; Zreľák 70'	Report

Stadium Myjava, Myjava
Attendance: 2,187
Referee: Ville Nevalainen (Finland)
9 October 2015
13:00

Belarus	0–2	Turkey
	Report	Şahin 27'; Karaman 79'

City Stadium, Slutsk
Attendance: 1,018
Referee: Rob Rogers (Republic of Ireland)

11 October 2015
14:30

Netherlands	1–3	Slovakia
Janssen 16'	Report	Chrien 44'; Škriniar 64'; Bero 69'

Stadion de Goffert, Nijmegen
Attendance: 7,240
Referee: Eitan Shemeulevitch (Israel)
13 October 2015
16:00

Cyprus	0–1	Belarus
	Report	Klimovich 84'

Ammochostos Stadium, Larnaca
Attendance: 300
Referee: Nikola Dabanović (Montenegro)

12 November 2015
13:30

Cyprus	0–3	Turkey
	Report	Başaçıkoğlu 33'; Ayhan 53'; Mouhtaris 67' (o.g.)

Ammochostos Stadium, Larnaca
Attendance: 745
Referee: Jonathan Lardot (Belgium)
12 November 2015
18:30

Netherlands	1–0	Belarus
Janssen 25'	Report

Koning Willem II Stadion, Tilburg
Attendance: 4,615
Referee: Anatolii Zhabchenko (Ukraine)

17 November 2015
16:30

Belarus	2–2	Cyprus
Rassadkin 10'; Savitski 48'	Report	Antoniou 6'; Makris 42'

Haradski Stadium, Barysaw
Attendance: 250
Referee: Roomer Tarajev (Estonia)
17 November 2015
18:00

Slovakia	4–2	Netherlands
Mihalík 50'; Rusnák 64'; Chrien 83'; Zreľák 90+4' (pen.)	Report	Janssen 16', 23'

Stadium Myjava, Myjava
Attendance: 2,614
Referee: Sandro Schärer (Switzerland)

29 March 2016
17:45

Slovakia	5–0	Turkey
Zreľák 10', 79' (pen.), 85'; Rusnák 23'; Mihalík 75'	Report

Stadium Myjava, Myjava
Attendance: 2,662
Referee: Tiago Martins (Portugal)

1 September 2016
18:30

Turkey	0–1	Cyprus
	Report	Katelaris 22'

Osmanlı Stadyumu, Ankara
Attendance: 162
Referee: Mitja Žganec (Slovenia)
2 September 2016
17:15

Belarus	2–2	Netherlands
Savitski 18' (pen.), 76'	Report	El Ghazi 68'; Luckassen 78'

FC Minsk Stadium, Minsk
Attendance: 750
Referee: Aliyar Aghayev (Azerbaijan)

5 September 2016
15:30

Cyprus	0–3	Slovakia
	Report	Chrien 1'; Bero 58'; Rusnák 72'

Ammochostos Stadium, Larnaca
Attendance: 450
Referee: Vitali Meshkov (Russia)
6 September 2016
18:30

Turkey	1–0	Belarus
Çağlayan 30'	Report

Osmanlı Stadyumu, Ankara
Attendance: 203
Referee: Kevin Clancy (Scotland)

6 October 2016
18:30

Netherlands	0–0	Turkey
	Report

AFAS Stadion, Alkmaar
Attendance: 7,000
Referee: Carlos del Cerro Grande (Spain)
7 October 2016
18:30

Slovakia	3–1	Belarus
Šafranko 36', 61'; Chrien 90+1'	Report	Yablonskiy 72'

Stadium Myjava, Myjava
Attendance: 2,795
Referee: Alexandre Boucaut (Belgium)

11 October 2016
16:00

Cyprus	1–4	Netherlands
Ioannou 20'	Report	Van de Beek 17'; Bergwijn 41', 66'; Bazoer 57'

Ammochostos Stadium, Larnaca
Attendance: 250
Referee: Danilo Grujić (Serbia)
11 October 2016
16:00

Turkey	1–1	Slovakia
Hruška 44' (o.g.)	Report	Lobotka 70' (pen.)

Alanya Oba Stadium, Alanya
Attendance: 549
Referee: Radu Petrescu (Romania)

== Goalscorers ==
6 goals

- (Netherlands) Vincent Janssen

5 goals

- (Slovakia) Adam Zreľák

4 goals

- (Slovakia) Martin Chrien

3 goals

- (Belarus) Pavel Savitski
- (Slovakia) Jaroslav Mihalík
- (Slovakia) Albert Rusnák

2 goals

- (Netherlands) Riechedly Bazoer
- (Netherlands) Steven Bergwijn
- (Slovakia) Matúš Bero
- (Slovakia) Pavol Šafranko

1 goal

- (Belarus) Vladislav Klimovich
- (Belarus) Gleb Rassadkin
- (Belarus) Yevgeniy Yablonskiy
- (Belarus) Yaroslav Yarotsky
- (Cyprus) Minas Antoniou
- (Cyprus) Nicholas Ioannou
- (Cyprus) Fanos Katelaris
- (Cyprus) Andreas Makris
- (Netherlands) Donny van de Beek
- (Netherlands) Jean-Paul Boëtius
- (Netherlands) Anwar El Ghazi
- (Netherlands) Hans Hateboer
- (Netherlands) Derrick Luckassen
- (Slovakia) Stanislav Lobotka
- (Slovakia) Milan Škriniar
- (Turkey) Kaan Ayhan
- (Turkey) Bilal Başaçıkoğlu
- (Turkey) Oğulcan Çağlayan
- (Turkey) Kenan Karaman
- (Turkey) Cenk Şahin

1 own goal

- (Cyprus) Stefanos Mouhtaris (against Turkey)
- (Slovakia) Matúš Hruška (against Turkey)
