= 2017 UEFA European Under-21 Championship qualification Group 9 =

Football tournament qualification stage

Group 9 of the 2017 UEFA European Under-21 Championship qualifying competition consisted of five teams: England, Switzerland, Norway, Bosnia and Herzegovina, and Kazakhstan. The composition of the nine groups in the qualifying group stage was decided by the draw held on 5 February 2015.

The group was played in a home-and-away round-robin format. The group winners qualified directly for the final tournament, while the runners-up advanced to the play-offs if they were one of the four best runners-up among all nine groups (not counting results against the sixth-placed team).

== Standings ==
| Pos | Team | Pld | W | D | L | GF | GA | GD | Pts | Qualification | England | Norway | Switzerland | Kazakhstan | Bosnia and Herzegovina |
|---|---|---|---|---|---|---|---|---|---|---|---|---|---|---|---|
| 1 | England | 8 | 6 | 2 | 0 | 20 | 3 | +17 | 20 | Final tournament | — | 6–1 | 3–1 | 3–0 | 5–0 |
| 2 | Norway | 8 | 5 | 1 | 2 | 12 | 10 | +2 | 16 | Play-offs | 0–1 | — | 2–1 | 2–1 | 2–0 |
| 3 | Switzerland | 8 | 3 | 3 | 2 | 11 | 8 | +3 | 12 | | 1–1 | 1–1 | — | 3–0 | 3–1 |
| 4 | Kazakhstan | 8 | 1 | 1 | 6 | 3 | 14 | −11 | 4 | | 0–1 | 0–3 | 0–1 | — | 0–0 |
| 5 | Bosnia and Herzegovina | 8 | 0 | 3 | 5 | 2 | 13 | −11 | 3 | | 0–0 | 0–1 | 0–0 | 1–2 | — |

Source: UEFA
Rules for classification: Qualification tiebreakers

== Matches ==
Times are CEST (UTC+2) for dates between 29 March and 24 October 2015 and between 27 March and 29 October 2016, for other dates times are CET (UTC+1).

13 June 2015
16:00

| Norway | 2–0 | Bosnia and Herzegovina |
|---|---|---|
| Elyounoussi 45'; Aursnes 88' | Report |

Marienlyst Stadion, Drammen
Attendance: 1,361
Referee: Anatolii Zhabchenko (Ukraine)

2 September 2015
16:30

| Bosnia and Herzegovina | 1–2 | Kazakhstan |
|---|---|---|
| Hajradinović 58' | Report | Tuliyev 27'; Aimbetov 43' |

Asim Ferhatović Hase Stadium, Sarajevo
Attendance: 370
Referee: Vadims Direktorenko (Latvia)

7 September 2015
16:00

| Kazakhstan | 0–1 | Switzerland |
|---|---|---|
| | Report | Tarashaj 85' (pen.) |

Almaty Central Stadium, Almaty
Referee: Nikola Popov (Bulgaria)
7 September 2015
18:45

| Norway | 0–1 | England |
|---|---|---|
| | Report | Ward-Prowse 45+1' (pen.) |

Marienlyst Stadion, Drammen
Attendance: 3,750
Referee: Benoît Bastien (France)

8 October 2015
18:30

| Switzerland | 3–1 | Bosnia and Herzegovina |
|---|---|---|
| Tarashaj 12' (pen.), 76'; Tabaković 63' | Report | Ćerimagić 80' |

Tissot Arena, Biel/Bienne
Attendance: 1,565
Referee: Dumitri Muntean (Moldova)
8 October 2015
18:45

| Norway | 2–1 | Kazakhstan |
|---|---|---|
| Elyounoussi 14'; Sørloth 69' | Report | Zhalmukan 50' |

Marienlyst Stadion, Drammen
Referee: Jovan Kaludjerović (Montenegro)

12 October 2015
18:30

| Switzerland | 1–1 | Norway |
|---|---|---|
| Tabaković 30' | Report | Trondsen 19' |

Tissot Arena, Biel/Bienne
Attendance: 1,536
Referee: Dominik Ouschan (Austria)
13 October 2015
18:45

| England | 3–0 | Kazakhstan |
|---|---|---|
| Loftus-Cheek 53'; Redmond 70'; Akpom 90+4' | Report |

Ricoh Arena, Coventry
Attendance: 15,165
Referee: Tiago Martins (Portugal)

12 November 2015
13:00

| Bosnia and Herzegovina | 0–0 | England |
|---|---|---|
| | Report |

Asim Ferhatović Hase Stadium, Sarajevo
Attendance: 400
Referee: Alexander Harkam (Austria)

16 November 2015
18:45

| England | 3–1 | Switzerland |
|---|---|---|
| Ward-Prowse 82' (pen.); Watmore 85'; Akpom 90+1' | Report | Tarashaj 45' |

Falmer Stadium, Brighton and Hove
Attendance: 12,003
Referee: Andreas Ekberg (Sweden)

25 March 2016
15:00

| Kazakhstan | 0–0 | Bosnia and Herzegovina |
|---|---|---|
| | Report |

Astana Arena, Astana
Referee: Suren Baliyan (Armenia)
26 March 2016
19:00

| Switzerland | 1–1 | England |
|---|---|---|
| Kamberi 76' | Report | Akpom 47' |

Stockhorn Arena, Thun
Attendance: 2,589
Referee: Daniel Siebert (Germany)

2 September 2016
16:00

| Bosnia and Herzegovina | 0–1 | Norway |
|---|---|---|
| | Report | Elyounoussi 57' |

Stadion Grbavica, Sarajevo
Referee: Alexandros Aretopoulos (Greece)
2 September 2016
18:30

| Switzerland | 3–0 | Kazakhstan |
|---|---|---|
| Khelifi 28'; Angha 41'; Fernandes 63' | Report |

Tissot Arena, Biel/Bienne
Attendance: 464
Referee: Pavle Radovanović (Montenegro)

6 September 2016
16:00

| Bosnia and Herzegovina | 0–0 | Switzerland |
|---|---|---|
| | Report |

Stadion Grbavica, Sarajevo
Referee: Michael Tykgaard (Denmark)
6 September 2016
18:45

| England | 6–1 | Norway |
|---|---|---|
| Rashford 29', 66', 72' (pen.); Chalobah 38'; Loftus-Cheek 64'; Baker 86' | Report | Zahid 68' |

Colchester Community Stadium, Colchester
Attendance: 8,454
Referee: Ali Palabıyık (Turkey)

6 October 2016
17:00

| Kazakhstan | 0–1 | England |
|---|---|---|
| | Report | Gray 6' |

Central Stadium, Aktobe
Attendance: 12,720
Referee: Sergey Lapochkin (Russia)
7 October 2016
18:30

| Norway | 2–1 | Switzerland |
|---|---|---|
| Zahid 44'; Elyounoussi 79' | Report | Fernandes 66' |

Marienlyst Stadion, Drammen
Referee: Marco Guida (Italy)

11 October 2016
16:00

| England | 5–0 | Bosnia and Herzegovina |
|---|---|---|
| Swift 14'; Abraham 18', 68'; Onomah 49'; Watmore 62' | Report |

Bescot Stadium, Walsall
Attendance: 5,263
Referee: Mohammed Al-Hakim (Sweden)
11 October 2016
16:00

| Kazakhstan | 0–3 | Norway |
|---|---|---|
| | Report | Ødegaard 53', 85'; Zahid 68' |

Central Stadium, Aktobe
Referee: Nenad Djokić (Serbia)

== Goalscorers ==
4 goals

- (Norway) Mohamed Elyounoussi
- (Switzerland) Shani Tarashaj

3 goals

- (England) Chuba Akpom
- (England) Marcus Rashford
- (Norway) Ghayas Zahid

2 goals

- (England) Tammy Abraham
- (England) Ruben Loftus-Cheek
- (England) James Ward-Prowse
- (England) Duncan Watmore
- (Norway) Martin Ødegaard
- (Switzerland) Edimilson Fernandes
- (Switzerland) Haris Tabaković

1 goal

- (Bosnia and Herzegovina) Armin Ćerimagić
- (Bosnia and Herzegovina) Haris Hajradinović
- (England) Lewis Baker
- (England) Nathaniel Chalobah
- (England) Demarai Gray
- (England) Josh Onomah
- (England) Nathan Redmond
- (England) John Swift
- (Kazakhstan) Abat Aimbetov
- (Kazakhstan) Miras Tuliyev
- (Kazakhstan) Didar Zhalmukan
- (Norway) Fredrik Aursnes
- (Norway) Alexander Sørloth
- (Norway) Anders Trondsen
- (Switzerland) Martin Angha
- (Switzerland) Florian Kamberi
- (Switzerland) Salim Khelifi
