= 2017 UEFA European Under-21 Championship qualification Group 7 =

Football tournament qualification stage

Group 7 of the 2017 UEFA European Under-21 Championship qualifying competition consisted of six teams: Germany, Russia, Austria, Finland, Azerbaijan, and Faroe Islands. The composition of the nine groups in the qualifying group stage was decided by the draw held on 5 February 2015.

The group was played in home-and-away round-robin format. The group winners qualified directly for the final tournament, while the runners-up advanced to the play-offs if they were one of the four best runners-up among all nine groups (not counting results against the sixth-placed team).

== Standings ==
Pos	Team	Pld	W	D	L	GF	GA	GD	Pts	Qualification	Germany	Austria	Finland	Azerbaijan	Russia	Faroe Islands
1	Germany	10	10	0	0	35	8	+27	30	Final tournament	—	4–2	4–0	3–1	4–3	4–1
2	Austria	10	7	1	2	22	12	+10	22	Play-offs	1–4	—	2–0	7–0	4–3	1–0
3	Finland	10	4	2	4	13	10	+3	14		0–1	0–1	—	0–0	2–0	3–0
4	Azerbaijan	10	2	3	5	8	19	−11	9		0–3	0–2	0–1	—	3–0	1–1
5	Russia	10	2	3	5	15	19	−4	9		0–2	1–1	1–1	2–2	—	2–0
6	Faroe Islands	10	0	1	9	3	28	−25	1		0–6	0–1	1–6	0–1	0–3	—

Source: UEFA
Rules for classification: Qualification tiebreakers

== Matches ==
Times are CEST (UTC+2) for dates between 29 March and 24 October 2015 and between 27 March and 29 October 2016, for other dates times are CET (UTC+1).

17 June 2015
18:00

Faroe Islands	0–1	Azerbaijan
	Report	Salahli 81'

Svangaskarð, Toftir
Referee: Roomer Tarajev (Estonia)

4 September 2015
16:00

Azerbaijan	0–2	Austria
	Report	Gregoritsch 14', 45' (pen.)

Dalga Arena, Baku
Attendance: 150
Referee: Denis Scherbakov (Belarus)
4 September 2015
17:30

Finland	2–0	Russia
Lassas 17'; Mero 36'	Report

Arto Tolsa Areena, Kotka
Referee: Peter Kralović (Slovakia)

8 September 2015
16:00

Azerbaijan	0–3	Germany
	Report	Selke 33', 90+3'; Kimmich 88' (pen.)

Dalga Arena, Baku
Referee: Alexandre Boucaut (Belgium)
8 September 2015
17:30

Austria	4–3	Russia
Gregoritsch 9'; Schaub 21'; Schöpf 53', 79'	Report	Sheydayev 41', 64' (pen.); Tashayev 49'

NV Arena, Sankt Pölten
Referee: Serdar Gözübüyük (Netherlands)
8 September 2015
17:30

Finland	3–0	Faroe Islands
Yaghoubi 24' (pen.), 39'; Skrabb 31'	Report

Myyrmäen jalkapallostadion, Vantaa
Referee: Alexandru Tean (Moldova)

9 October 2015
17:30

Austria	7–0	Azerbaijan
Grillitsch 45+1'; Gregoritsch 49' (pen.), 74', 88'; Friesenbichler 60'; Schöpf 75'; Wydra 90+5' (pen.)	Report

NV Arena, Sankt Pölten
Referee: Gunnar Jarl Jónsson (Iceland)
9 October 2015
18:00

Germany	4–0	Finland
Sané 13', 90+1'; Selke 16'; Kimmich 27'	Report

Stadion Essen, Essen
Attendance: 4,675
Referee: Kristo Tohver (Estonia)

13 October 2015
16:00

Azerbaijan	0–1	Finland
	Report	Lassas 80'

Dalga Arena, Baku
Referee: Milan Ilić (Serbia)
13 October 2015
18:30

Faroe Islands	0–6	Germany
	Report	Meyer 8', 40'; Arnold 13'; Süle 45+2'; Sané 73'; Gnabry 75'

Tórsvøllur, Tórshavn
Attendance: 581
Referee: Sascha Amhof (Switzerland)

12 November 2015
17:00

Russia	2–0	Faroe Islands
Sheydayev 54'; Panyukov 77'	Report

Kuban Stadium, Krasnodar
Referee: Aleksandrs Anufrijevs (Latvia)
13 November 2015
18:00

Germany	3–1	Azerbaijan
Werner 37', 63'; Arnold 43'	Report	Isayev 30'

Continental Arena, Regensburg
Attendance: 8,922
Referee: Tsvetan Krastev (Bulgaria)
13 November 2015
18:00

Austria	2–0	Finland
Gregoritsch 77'; Friesenbichler 90+1'	Report

Franz Horr Stadium, Vienna
Referee: Bojan Pandžić (Sweden)

17 November 2015
14:00

Azerbaijan	3–0	Russia
Behnke 11', 39'; Abdullayev 69' (pen.)	Report

Bayil Stadium, Baku
Referee: Eitan Shmuelevitz (Israel)
17 November 2015
18:00

Germany	4–2	Austria
Meyer 39'; Goretzka 42'; Selke 50'; Sané 76'	Report	Gregoritsch 21' (pen.), 86'

Stadion am Laubenweg, Fürth
Referee: Alejandro Hernández Hernández (Spain)

24 March 2016
17:30

Russia	2–2	Azerbaijan
Zuyev 51'; Barinov 56'	Report	Madatov 46'; Mammadov 59'

Olimp-2, Rostov-on-Don
Referee: Tomasz Musiał (Poland)
24 March 2016
20:00

Germany	4–1	Faroe Islands
Sané 17'; Nattestad 59' (o.g.); Meyer 63' (pen.); Brandt 74'	Report	Bogason Dam 43'

Stadion am Bornheimer Hang, Frankfurt
Attendance: 4,152
Referee: Peter Kralović (Slovakia)

29 March 2016
18:00

Austria	1–0	Faroe Islands
Sallahi 28'	Report

Franz Horr Stadium, Vienna
Referee: Laurent Kopriwa (Luxembourg)
29 March 2016
18:00

Russia	0–2	Germany
	Report	Selke 11'; Meyer 79'

Olimp-2, Rostov-on-Don
Attendance: 3,000
Referee: Charalambos Kalogeropoulos (Greece)

2 June 2016
19:00

Faroe Islands	1–6	Finland
Edmundsson 35'	Report	Tuominen 18'; Lassas 38'; O'Shaughnessy 42'; Hambo 45', 73'; T. Olsen 90+2' (o.g.)

Tórsvøllur, Tórshavn
Referee: Johnny Casanova (San Marino)

1 September 2016
19:00

Faroe Islands	0–3	Russia
	Report	Komlichenko 8'; Karpov 30'; Yevseyev 43'

Svangaskarð, Toftir
Referee: Donatas Rumšas (Lithuania)
2 September 2016
18:00

Finland	0–1	Austria
	Report	Dovedan 90+1'

Hietalahti Stadium, Vaasa
Referee: Anatoliy Abdula (Ukraine)

6 September 2016
16:00

Russia	1–1	Austria
Zuyev 33'	Report	Jakupovic 55'

Arena Khimki, Khimki
Referee: Arnold Hunter (Northern Ireland)
6 September 2016
16:00

Azerbaijan	1–1	Faroe Islands
Madatov 88'	Report	Jónsson 40'

Dalga Arena, Baku
Referee: Dumitri Muntean (Moldova)
6 September 2016
18:00

Finland	0–1	Germany
	Report	Väisänen 41' (o.g.)

OmaSP Stadion, Seinäjoki
Attendance: 2,582
Referee: Benoît Millot (France)

7 October 2016
16:30

Faroe Islands	0–1	Austria
	Report	Schoissengeyr 44'

Svangaskarð, Toftir
Referee: Svein-Erik Edvartsen (Norway)
7 October 2016
17:30

Finland	0–0	Azerbaijan
	Report

Töölön Pallokenttä, Helsinki
Referee: Peter Kjærsgaard-Andersen (Denmark)
7 October 2016
18:00

Germany	4–3	Russia
Arnold 12', 57' (pen.); Gnabry 34'; Selke 36'	Report	Lystsov 35'; Yevseyev 45'; Bezdenezhnykh 60'

Audi Sportpark, Ingolstadt
Attendance: 7,043
Referee: Frank Schneider (France)

11 October 2016
18:00

Austria	1–4	Germany
Lienhart 86'	Report	Arnold 12'; Öztunalı 52'; Selke 58'; Haberer 78' (pen.)

NV Arena, Sankt Pölten
Attendance: 1,570
Referee: Adrien Jaccottet (Switzerland)
11 October 2016
18:00

Russia	1–1	Finland
Paliyenko 3'	Report	Viitikko 64'

Arena Khimki, Khimki
Referee: Alan Mario Sant (Malta)

== Goalscorers ==
9 goals

- (Austria) Michael Gregoritsch

7 goals

- (Germany) Davie Selke

5 goals

- (Germany) Maximilian Arnold
- (Germany) Max Meyer
- (Germany) Leroy Sané

3 goals

- (Austria) Alessandro Schöpf
- (Finland) Fredrik Lassas
- (Russia) Ramil Sheydayev

2 goals

- (Austria) Kevin Friesenbichler
- (Azerbaijan) Kerem Behnke
- (Azerbaijan) Mahir Madatov
- (Finland) Vahid Hambo
- (Finland) Moshtagh Yaghoubi
- (Germany) Serge Gnabry
- (Germany) Joshua Kimmich
- (Germany) Timo Werner
- (Russia) Alexey Yevseyev
- (Russia) Ilya Zuyev

1 goal

- (Austria) Nikola Dovedan
- (Austria) Florian Grillitsch
- (Austria) Arnel Jakupovic
- (Austria) Philipp Lienhart
- (Austria) Ylli Sallahi
- (Austria) Louis Schaub
- (Austria) Christian Schoissengeyr
- (Austria) Dominik Wydra
- (Azerbaijan) Elshan Abdullayev
- (Azerbaijan) Magsad Isayev
- (Azerbaijan) Rahil Mammadov
- (Azerbaijan) Azer Salahli
- (Faroe Islands) Gestur Bogason Dam
- (Faroe Islands) Hákun Edmundsson
- (Faroe Islands) Ári Jónsson
- (Finland) Joel Mero
- (Finland) Daniel O'Shaughnessy
- (Finland) Simon Skrabb
- (Finland) Jasse Tuominen
- (Finland) Mikko Viitikko
- (Germany) Julian Brandt
- (Germany) Leon Goretzka
- (Germany) Janik Haberer
- (Germany) Levin Öztunalı
- (Germany) Niklas Süle
- (Russia) Dmitri Barinov
- (Russia) Igor Bezdenezhnykh
- (Russia) Maksim Karpov
- (Russia) Nikolay Komlichenko
- (Russia) Vitali Lystsov
- (Russia) Maksim Paliyenko
- (Russia) Andrei Panyukov
- (Russia) Aleksandr Tashayev

1 own goal

- (Faroe Islands) Sonni Nattestad (against Germany)
- (Faroe Islands) Teitur Olsen (against Finland)
- (Finland) Sauli Väisänen (against Germany)
