= 2017 UEFA European Under-21 Championship qualification Group 4 =

Football tournament qualification stage

Group 4 of the 2017 UEFA European Under-21 Championship qualifying competition consisted of six teams: Portugal, Israel, Greece, Hungary, Albania, and Liechtenstein. The composition of the nine groups in the qualifying group stage was decided by the draw held on 5 February 2015.

The group was played in home-and-away round-robin format. The group winners qualified directly for the final tournament, while the runners-up advanced to the play-offs if they were one of the four best runners-up among all nine groups (not counting results against the sixth-placed team).

== Standings ==
Pos	Team	Pld	W	D	L	GF	GA	GD	Pts	Qualification	Portugal	Israel	Greece	Albania	Hungary	Liechtenstein
1	Portugal	10	8	2	0	34	5	+29	26	Final tournament	—	0–0	1–0	4–0	2–0	4–0
2	Israel	10	6	3	1	21	4	+17	21		0–3	—	4–0	4–0	3–0	4–0
3	Greece	10	4	1	5	13	14	−1	13		0–4	0–1	—	2–1	3–1	5–0
4	Albania	10	3	3	4	11	20	−9	12		1–6	1–1	0–0	—	2–1	2–0
5	Hungary	10	3	3	4	19	16	+3	12		3–3	0–0	2–1	2–2	—	4–0
6	Liechtenstein	10	0	0	10	1	40	−39	0		1–7	0–4	0–2	0–2	0–6	—

Source: UEFA
Rules for classification: Qualification tiebreakers

== Matches ==
Times are CEST (UTC+2) for dates between 29 March and 24 October 2015 and between 27 March and 29 October 2016, for other dates times are CET (UTC+1).

28 March 2015
20:30

Liechtenstein	0–2	Albania
	Report	Latifi 31'; Manaj 52'

Sportpark Eschen-Mauren, Eschen
Referee: Zbyněk Proske (Czech Republic)

7 June 2015
18:00

Liechtenstein	0–4	Israel
	Report	Kinda 5'; Altman 49', 62'; Abu Abaid 58'

Rheinpark Stadion, Vaduz
Referee: Giorgi Kruashvili (Georgia)

3 September 2015
15:00

Albania	1–1	Israel
Çekiçi 84' (pen.)	Report	Hugi 29'

Qemal Stafa Stadium, Tirana
Referee: Sergei Ivanov (Russia)
3 September 2015
15:00

Liechtenstein	0–6	Hungary
	Report	Márkvárt 29'; Prosser 39', 68'; Forgács 45'; Kleinheisler 59'; Sallai 90'

Sportpark Eschen-Mauren, Eschen
Referee: Tihomir Pejin (Croatia)

7 September 2015
18:45

Liechtenstein	0–2	Greece
	Report	Ioannidis 43', 75'

Sportpark Eschen-Mauren, Eschen
Referee: Adrian Azzopardi (Malta)
8 September 2015
18:00

Albania	1–6	Portugal
Rashica 83'	Report	Neves 31'; Lopes 36'; Silva 43', 45', 62'; Horta 70'

Qemal Stafa Stadium, Tirana
Referee: Marco Fritz (Germany)

9 October 2015
18:15

Portugal	2–0	Hungary
Fernandes 35'; Paciência 56'	Report

Estádio Municipal 25 de Abril, Penafiel
Attendance: 5,282
Referee: Neil Doyle (Republic of Ireland)

13 October 2015
17:30

Greece	0–4	Portugal
	Report	Guedes 44'; Martins 50'; Cancelo 87'; Paciência 90+3'

Skoda Xanthi Arena, Xanthi
Referee: Amaury Delerue (France)
13 October 2015
18:45

Hungary	2–2	Albania
Prosser 28', 63'	Report	Manaj 24'; Latifi 43'

Pancho Arena, Felcsút
Referee: Erik Lambrechts (Belgium)

12 November 2015
14:00

Greece	5–0	Liechtenstein
Mavrias 20', 37'; Fountas 32'; Vergos 60'; Ioannidis 70'	Report

Grigoris Lambrakis Stadium, Kallithea
Referee: Anders Poulsen (Denmark)
12 November 2015
18:15

Portugal	4–0	Albania
Horta 43'; Mané 47'; Vezo 60'; Paciência 82'	Report

Estádio Municipal de Arouca, Arouca
Referee: Sergejus Slyva (Lithuania)
12 November 2015
18:45

Israel	3–0	Hungary
David 60'; Gozlan 85'; Ohana 90+2'	Report

HaMoshava Stadium, Petah Tikva
Referee: Jari Järvinen (Finland)

16 November 2015
18:00

Albania	2–0	Liechtenstein
Latifi 18'; Laçi 83'	Report

Elbasan Arena, Elbasan
Referee: Vasilis Dimitriou (Cyprus)
16 November 2015
18:00

Hungary	2–1	Greece
Kalmár 45'; Bese 78'	Report	Ioannidis 75' (pen.)

Ménfői út, Győr
Referee: Tomasz Musiał (Poland)
17 November 2015
18:40

Israel	0–3	Portugal
	Report	Fernandes 28' (pen.); Silva 35'; Horta 87'

HaMoshava Stadium, Petah Tikva
Referee: Ola Hobber Nilsen (Norway)

24 March 2016
18:00

Albania	0–0	Greece
	Report

Elbasan Arena, Elbasan
Referee: Nicolas Rainville (France)
24 March 2016
18:15

Portugal	4–0	Liechtenstein
Semedo 8'; Figueiredo 10'; Paciência 13'; Bruma 24'	Report

Estádio de São Miguel, Ponta Delgada
Referee: Irfan Peljto (Bosnia and Herzegovina)
24 March 2016
19:00

Hungary	0–0	Israel
	Report

Ménfői út, Győr
Referee: Vilhjálmur Þórarinsson (Iceland)

28 March 2016
15:30

Greece	0–1	Israel
	Report	Gozlan 74'

Peristeri Stadium, Peristeri
Referee: Tihomir Pejin (Croatia)
28 March 2016
20:00

Albania	2–1	Hungary
Manaj 69'; Prenga 79'	Report	Gera 55'

Elbasan Arena, Elbasan
Referee: Nikola Popov (Bulgaria)

1 September 2016
20:00

Hungary	4–0	Liechtenstein
Mervó 18', 68'; Berecz 60'; Frick 79' (o.g.)	Report

Ménfői út, Győr
Referee: Georgi Vadachkoria (Georgia)
2 September 2016
16:45

Greece	2–1	Albania
Ioannidis 44' (pen.); Tsilianidis 90'	Report	Latifi 22'

Peristeri Stadium, Peristeri
Referee: Artyom Kuchin (Kazakhstan)
2 September 2016
18:15

Portugal	0–0	Israel
	Report

Estádio da Mata Real, Paços de Ferreira
Referee: Nenad Djokić (Serbia)

6 September 2016
18:15

Portugal	1–0	Greece
Martins 54'	Report

Estádio Cidade de Barcelos, Barcelos
Referee: Nicolas Laforge (Belgium)
6 September 2016
18:45

Israel	4–0	Liechtenstein
E. Peretz 35'; Ohana 43', 63'; Barshazki 61'	Report

HaMoshava Stadium, Petah Tikva
Referee: Dejan Jakimovski (Macedonia)

6 October 2016
18:45

Hungary	3–3	Portugal
D. Nagy 28' (pen.); Prosser 62'; Balogh 78'	Report	Jota 10'; Carvalho 13'; Podence 48'

Ménfői út, Győr
Referee: Kevin Clancy (Scotland)
6 October 2016
18:45

Israel	4–0	Greece
Altman 27', 60' (pen.); Gozlan 42'; D. Peretz 55'	Report

Turner Stadium, Be'er Sheva
Referee: Anatoliy Abdula (Ukraine)

10 October 2016
15:30

Greece	3–1	Hungary
Donis 28'; Koulouris 69'; Charisis 83'	Report	Mervó 56'

Peristeri Stadium, Peristeri
Referee: Petr Ardeleánu (Czech Republic)
10 October 2016
18:45

Israel	4–0	Albania
Gozlan 18'; Altman 43'; Biton 55'; Hugi 70'	Report

HaMoshava Stadium, Petah Tikva
Referee: Arnold Hunter (Northern Ireland)
11 October 2016
18:30

Liechtenstein	1–7	Portugal
Salanović 3'	Report	Fernandes 20'; Podence 24'; Guedes 26', 53'; Carvalho 28'; Neves 75'; Semedo 84'

Rheinpark Stadion, Vaduz
Referee: Jørgen Burchardt (Denmark)

== Goalscorers ==
5 goals

- (Greece) Nikolaos Ioannidis
- (Hungary) Dániel Prosser
- (Israel) Omri Altman

4 goals

- (Albania) Liridon Latifi
- (Israel) Shoval Gozlan
- (Portugal) Gonçalo Paciência
- (Portugal) André Silva

3 goals

- (Albania) Rey Manaj
- (Hungary) Bence Mervó
- (Israel) Michael Ohana
- (Portugal) Bruno Fernandes
- (Portugal) Gonçalo Guedes
- (Portugal) Ricardo Horta

2 goals

- (Greece) Charalampos Mavrias
- (Israel) Dor Hugi
- (Portugal) João Carvalho
- (Portugal) Gelson Martins
- (Portugal) Rúben Neves
- (Portugal) Daniel Podence
- (Portugal) Rúben Semedo

1 goal

- (Albania) Endri Çekiçi
- (Albania) Qazim Laçi
- (Albania) Herdi Prenga
- (Albania) Milot Rashica
- (Greece) Charis Charisis
- (Greece) Anastasios Donis
- (Greece) Taxiarchis Fountas
- (Greece) Efthimis Koulouris
- (Greece) Kosmas Tsilianidis
- (Greece) Nikos Vergos
- (Hungary) Norbert Balogh
- (Hungary) Zsombor Berecz
- (Hungary) Barnabás Bese
- (Hungary) Dávid Forgács
- (Hungary) Dániel Gera
- (Hungary) Zsolt Kalmár
- (Hungary) László Kleinheisler
- (Hungary) Dávid Márkvárt
- (Hungary) Dominik Nagy
- (Hungary) Roland Sallai
- (Israel) Eyad Abu Abaid
- (Israel) Moti Barshazki
- (Israel) Oren Biton
- (Israel) Dean David
- (Israel) Gadi Kinda
- (Israel) Dor Peretz
- (Israel) Eliel Peretz
- (Liechtenstein) Dennis Salanović
- (Portugal) Bruma
- (Portugal) João Cancelo
- (Portugal) Tobias Figueiredo
- (Portugal) Diogo Jota
- (Portugal) Rony Lopes
- (Portugal) Carlos Mané
- (Portugal) Rúben Vezo

1 own goal

- (Liechtenstein) Yanik Frick (against Hungary)
