= 2017 UEFA European Under-21 Championship qualification Group 3 =

Football tournament qualification stage

Group 3 of the 2017 UEFA European Under-21 Championship qualifying competition consisted of six teams: France, Ukraine, Scotland, Iceland, Macedonia, and Northern Ireland. The composition of the nine groups in the qualifying group stage was decided by the draw held on 5 February 2015.

The group was played in home-and-away round-robin format. The group winners qualified directly for the final tournament, while the runners-up advanced to the play-offs if they were one of the four best runners-up among all nine groups (not counting results against the sixth-placed team).

== Standings ==
Pos	Team	Pld	W	D	L	GF	GA	GD	Pts	Qualification	North Macedonia	France	Iceland	Ukraine	Scotland	
1	Macedonia	10	6	3	1	13	7	+6	21	Final tournament	—	2–2	0–0	1–0	2–0	2–0
2	France	10	6	2	2	17	8	+9	20		1–1	—	2–0	2–0	2–0	1–0
3	Iceland	10	5	3	2	13	9	+4	18		3–0	3–2	—	2–4	2–0	1–1
4	Ukraine	10	4	2	4	14	12	+2	14		0–2	1–0	0–1	—	4–0	1–1
5	Scotland	10	2	2	6	8	17	−9	8		0–1	1–2	0–0	2–2	—	3–1
6	Northern Ireland	10	0	2	8	6	18	−12	2		1–2	0–3	0–1	1–2	1–2	—

Source: UEFA
Rules for classification: Qualification tiebreakers

== Matches ==
Times are CEST (UTC+2) for dates between 29 March and 24 October 2015 and between 27 March and 29 October 2016, for other dates times are CET (UTC+1).

11 June 2015
21:15

Iceland	3–0	Macedonia
E. Ómarsson 55'; Gunnlaugsson 61', 67'	Report

Hlíðarendi, Reykjavík
Referee: Tore Hansen (Norway)

5 September 2015
15:00

Northern Ireland	1–2	Scotland
Kennedy 7'	Report	Christie 33'; Fraser 61'

Mourneview Park, Lurgan
Referee: Andris Treimanis (Latvia)
5 September 2015
16:00

Iceland	3–2	France
Sigurjónsson 10', 85' (pen.); Hermannsson 48'	Report	Laporte 39'; Kyei 90'

Kópavogsvöllur, Kópavogur
Referee: Jesús Gil Manzano (Spain)
5 September 2015
16:00

Macedonia	1–0	Ukraine
Radeski 90+3'	Report

Training Centre Petar Miloševski, Skopje
Referee: Daniel Stefański (Poland)

8 September 2015
18:30

Iceland	1–1	Northern Ireland
Þrándarson 37'	Report	Johnson 2'

Fylkisvöllur, Reykjavík
Referee: Mohammed Al-Hakim (Sweden)

8 October 2015
18:00

Ukraine	0–1	Iceland
	Report	Vilhjálmsson 71'

Tsentralnyi Stadion, Cherkasy
Referee: Adrien Jaccottet (Switzerland)
10 October 2015
16:00

Scotland	1–2	France
King 90+1'	Report	Kingsley 11' (o.g.); Tolisso 53'

Pittodrie Stadium, Aberdeen
Referee: Marco Guida (Italy)

13 October 2015
18:00

Northern Ireland	1–2	Macedonia
Doherty 43'	Report	Babunski 46'; Markoski 85'

Mourneview Park, Lurgan
Referee: Sándor Andó-Szabó (Hungary)
13 October 2015
18:45

France	2–0	Ukraine
Lemar 70'; Rabiot 77'	Report

Stade de la Meinau, Strasbourg
Referee: Andreas Pappas (Greece)
13 October 2015
18:45

Scotland	0–0	Iceland
	Report

Pittodrie Stadium, Aberdeen
Referee: István Kovács (Romania)

12 November 2015
18:45

France	1–0	Northern Ireland
Crivelli 82'	Report

Stade du Roudourou, Guingamp
Referee: Zaven Hovhannisyan (Armenia)
13 November 2015
18:45

Scotland	2–2	Ukraine
Cummings 31'; Paterson 37'	Report	Khlyobas 26'; Svatok 83'

St Mirren Park, Paisley
Referee: Nicolas Laforge (Belgium)

15 November 2015
13:00

Macedonia	2–2	France
Angelov 19'; Radeski 40'	Report	Haller 65'; Nkoudou 72'

Training Centre Petar Miloševski, Skopje
Referee: Vitali Meshkov (Russia)
17 November 2015
20:30

Northern Ireland	1–2	Ukraine
McCartan 53'	Report	Kovalenko 64', 73'

Mourneview Park, Lurgan
Referee: Ognjen Valjić (Bosnia and Herzegovina)

24 March 2016
14:00

Macedonia	0–0	Iceland
	Report

Training Centre Petar Miloševski, Skopje
Referee: Neil Doyle (Republic of Ireland)
24 March 2016
21:00

France	2–0	Scotland
Haller 69', 74'	Report

Stade Jean-Bouin, Angers
Referee: Nikola Dabanović (Montenegro)

28 March 2016
21:00

France	1–1	Macedonia
Bejtulai 27' (o.g.)	Report	Angelov 15'

MMArena, Le Mans
Referee: Mads-Kristoffer Kristoffersen (Denmark)
29 March 2016
17:00

Scotland	3–1	Northern Ireland
McBurnie 58'; Cummings 64', 78'	Report	McCartan 13'

St Mirren Park, Paisley
Referee: Craig Pawson (England)

27 May 2016
18:00

Ukraine	0–2	Macedonia
	Report	Radeski 18'; Demiri 56'

Valeriy Lobanovskyi Dynamo Stadium, Kyiv
Referee: Rahim Hasanov (Azerbaijan)

2 September 2016
20:00

Northern Ireland	0–1	Iceland
	Report	Ægisson 87'

Mourneview Park, Lurgan
Referee: Ville Nevalainen (Finland)
2 September 2016
20:30

Scotland	0–1	Macedonia
	Report	Markoski 18'

Tynecastle Stadium, Edinburgh
Referee: Sebastian Colțescu (Romania)
2 September 2016
21:00

Ukraine	1–0	France
Vakulko 90+2'	Report

Obolon Arena, Kyiv
Referee: Manuel Schüttengruber (Austria)

6 September 2016
17:30

Ukraine	4–0	Scotland
Bliznichenko 26'; Besyedin 69', 77'; Boryachuk 90+2' (pen.)	Report

Obolon Arena, Kyiv
Referee: Edin Jakupović (Bosnia and Herzegovina)
6 September 2016
18:45

France	2–0	Iceland
Tolisso 11', 62'	Report

Stade Michel d'Ornano, Caen
Referee: Bobby Madley (England)
6 September 2016
18:45

Macedonia	2–0	Northern Ireland
Doherty 37' (o.g.); Markoski 85'	Report

Philip II Arena, Skopje
Referee: Boris Marhefka (Slovakia)

5 October 2016
17:30

Iceland	2–0	Scotland
Þrándarson 47'; E. Ómarsson 66'	Report

Víkingsvöllur, Reykjavík
Referee: Christian Dingert (Germany)
6 October 2016
17:30

Ukraine	1–1	Northern Ireland
Besyedin 15'	Report	Smyth 12'

Obolon Arena, Kyiv
Referee: Fran Jović (Croatia)

11 October 2016
18:45

Iceland	2–4	Ukraine
Grétarsson 22'; E. Ómarsson 88'	Report	Boryachuk 56', 90'; Besyedin 75'; Zubkov 90+4'

Laugardalsvöllur, Reykjavík
Referee: Michael Tykgaard (Denmark)
11 October 2016
18:45

Macedonia	2–0	Scotland
Markoski 18'; Bardhi 22'	Report

Philip II Arena, Skopje
Referee: Kristo Tohver (Estonia)
11 October 2016
18:45

Northern Ireland	0–3	France
	Report	Augustin 16', 42'; Dembélé 89'

Windsor Park, Belfast
Referee: João Pinheiro (Portugal)

== Goalscorers ==
4 goals

- (North Macedonia) Kire Markoski
- (Ukraine) Artem Besyedin

3 goals

- (France) Sébastien Haller
- (France) Corentin Tolisso
- (Iceland) Elías Már Ómarsson
- (North Macedonia) Marjan Radeski
- (Scotland) Jason Cummings
- (Ukraine) Andriy Boryachuk

2 goals

- (France) Jean-Kévin Augustin
- (Iceland) Höskuldur Gunnlaugsson
- (Iceland) Oliver Sigurjónsson
- (Iceland) Aron Elís Þrándarson
- (North Macedonia) Viktor Angelov
- (Northern Ireland) Shay McCartan
- (Ukraine) Viktor Kovalenko

1 goal

- (France) Enzo Crivelli
- (France) Moussa Dembélé
- (France) Grejohn Kyei
- (France) Aymeric Laporte
- (France) Thomas Lemar
- (France) Georges-Kévin Nkoudou
- (France) Adrien Rabiot
- (Iceland) Heiðar Ægisson
- (Iceland) Daníel Leó Grétarsson
- (Iceland) Hjörtur Hermannsson
- (Iceland) Árni Vilhjálmsson
- (North Macedonia) David Babunski
- (North Macedonia) Enis Bardhi
- (North Macedonia) Besir Demiri
- (Northern Ireland) Josh Doherty
- (Northern Ireland) Ryan Johnson
- (Northern Ireland) Mikhail Kennedy
- (Northern Ireland) Paul Smyth
- (Scotland) Ryan Christie
- (Scotland) Ryan Fraser
- (Scotland) Billy King
- (Scotland) Oli McBurnie
- (Scotland) Callum Paterson
- (Ukraine) Andriy Bliznichenko
- (Ukraine) Dmytro Khlyobas
- (Ukraine) Oleksandr Svatok
- (Ukraine) Yuriy Vakulko
- (Ukraine) Oleksandr Zubkov

1 own goal

- (North Macedonia) Egzon Bejtulai (against France)
- (Northern Ireland) Josh Doherty (against Macedonia)
- (Scotland) Stephen Kingsley (against France)
