= Nemanja Kartal =

Montenegrin footballer

Personal information
- Full name: Nemanja Kartal
- Date of birth: 17 July 1994 (age 32)
- Place of birth: Pljevlja, FR Yugoslavia
- Height: 1.95 m (6 ft 5 in)
- Position: Centre-back

Team information
- Current team: Rudar Pljevlja
- Number: 18

Youth career
- 2008–2012: Rudar Pljevlja

Senior career*
Years	Team	Apps	(Gls)
2013–2016	PAOK	0	(0)
2013	→ Anagennisi Epanomi (loan)	9	(0)
2013–2014	→ Anagennisi Giannitsa (loan)	22	(0)
2014–2016	→ Slavija Sarajevo (loan)	35	(2)
2016	Radnički Niš	3	(0)
2017	Krupa	2	(0)
2017–2019	Rudar Pljevlja	44	(0)
2019-2020	Grbalj	27	(0)
2020–2022	Rudar Pljevlja	43	(3)
2022	Maziya Sports Club	3	(0)
2023–	Rudar Pljevlja	15	(0)

International career^{‡}
2010	Montenegro U17	3	(0)
2016	Montenegro U21	2	(1)
- * Club domestic league appearances and goals as of 31 July 2023 ‡ National team caps and goals as of 5 August 2016

Nemanja Kartal (Cyrillic: Немања Картал; born 17 July 1994) is a Montenegrin professional footballer who plays as a central defender for Rudar Pljevlja.

== Club career ==
Born in Pljevlja, he started playing with local side FK Rudar Pljevlja youth teams where he was scouted by Greek side PAOK, who brought him to their ranks in 2013. He spent a total of three and a half years with PAOK by playing on loan at several clubs. First at Greek sides Anagennisi Epanomi (second half of 2012–13) and Anagennisi Giannitsa (2013–14), and then two seasons with FK Slavija in the Premier League of Bosnia and Herzegovina.

== International career ==
While still playing in Rudar Pljevlja youth teams, Kartal was spotted as a potential talented player and began playing for the Montenegrin U17 team in 2010. In spring 2016 he was back to the national team, this time to play for Montenegro U21.

In May 2016, he was part of Montenegro "B" team.
