= 2017 UEFA European Under-21 Championship =

21st edition of the UEFA European Under-21 Championship

Mistrzostwa Europy U-21 w Piłce Nożnej 2017

Tournament details
- Host country: Poland
- Dates: 16–30 June
- Teams: 12 (from 1 confederation)
- Venues: 6 (in 6 host cities)

Final positions
- Champions: Germany (2nd title)
- Runners-up: Spain

Tournament statistics
- Matches played: 21
- Goals scored: 65 (3.1 per match)
- Attendance: 244,085 (11,623 per match)
- Top scorer: (Spain) Saúl (5 goals)
- Best player: (Spain) Dani Ceballos

The 2017 UEFA European Under-21 Championship (also known as UEFA Under-21 Euro 2017) was the 21st edition of the UEFA European Under-21 Championship, a biennial international youth football championship organised by UEFA for the men's under-21 national teams of Europe. The final tournament was hosted in Poland for the first time, after their bid was selected by the UEFA Executive Committee on 26 January 2015 in Nyon, Switzerland. The tournament took place from 16 to 30 June 2017. Players born on or after 1 January 1994 were eligible for the tournament.

In March 2012, UEFA announced that the competition would take place in even numbered years from 2016 onwards. In September 2013, UEFA announced its intention to continue holding the final tournament in odd numbered years following a request from its member national football associations. On 24 January 2014, UEFA confirmed that the final tournament would be held in 2017 and that it would be expanded from 8 teams to 12.

== Hosts ==
The hosts were announced at a meeting of the UEFA Executive Committee in Nyon on 26 January 2015. In late April 2014, the Polish Football Association very strongly indicated the country has high chances to host the tournament. That bid was one of the reasons for which Poland withdrew from UEFA Euro 2020 hosting.

== Qualification ==
A total of 53 UEFA nations entered the competition (Gibraltar did not enter, as per usual), and with the hosts Poland qualifying automatically, the other 52 teams competed in the qualifying competition to determine the remaining 11 spots in the final tournament. The qualifying competition, which took place from March 2015 to November 2016, consisted of two rounds:

- Qualifying group stage: The 52 teams are drawn into nine groups – seven groups of six teams and two groups of five teams. Each group is played in home-and-away round-robin format. The nine group winners qualify directly for the final tournament, while the four best runners-up (not counting results against the sixth-placed team) advance to the play-offs.
- Play-offs: The four teams are drawn into two ties to play home-and-away two-legged matches to determine the last two qualified teams.

=== Qualified teams ===
The following 12 teams qualified for the final tournament.

Note: All appearance statistics include only U-21 era (since 1978).

Team	Method of qualification	Date of qualification	Finals appearance	Last appearance	Previous best performance
Poland	Hosts	26 January 2015	6th	1994	Quarter-finals (1982, 1984, 1986, 1992, 1994)
Portugal	Group 4 winners	6 September 2016	8th	2015	Runners-up (1994, 2015)
Denmark	Group 5 winners	6 September 2016	7th	2015	Semi-finals (1992, 2015)
England	Group 9 winners	6 October 2016	14th	2015	Winners (1982, 1984)
Slovakia	Group 8 winners	6 October 2016	2nd (8th incl. Czechoslovakia)	2000	Fourth place (2000)
Germany	Group 7 winners	7 October 2016	11th	2015	Winners (2009)
Czech Republic	Group 1 winners	7 October 2016	7th (13th incl. Czechoslovakia)	2015	Winners (2002)
Sweden	Group 6 winners	10 October 2016	8th	2015	Winners (2015)
Italy	Group 2 winners	11 October 2016	19th	2015	Winners (1992, 1994, 1996, 2000, 2004)
Macedonia	Group 3 winners	11 October 2016	1st	—	Debut
Spain	Play-off winners	15 November 2016	13th	2013	Winners (1986, 1998, 2011, 2013)
Serbia	Play-off winners	15 November 2016	6th (10th incl. Yugoslavia)	2015	Runners-up (2004, 2007); Winners (1978 as Yugoslavia)

=== Final draw ===
The final draw was held on 1 December 2016, 18:00 CET (UTC+1), at the ICE Congress Centre in Kraków. The 12 teams were drawn into three groups of four teams. The teams were seeded according to their coefficient ranking following the end of the qualifying play-offs, with the hosts Poland assigned to position A1 in the draw. Each group contained either the hosts or one team from Pot 1, one team from Pot 2, and two teams from Pot 3.

Hosts (Position A1)
Team	Coeff
Poland	28,102

Pot 1
Team	Coeff
Germany	39,037
Portugal	38,378

Pot 2
Team	Coeff
England	36,621
Spain	36,536
Denmark	35,590

Pot 3
Team	Coeff
Italy	35,546
Sweden	34,259
Czech Republic	33,690
Serbia	31,060
Slovakia	31,057
Macedonia	23,283

== Venues ==
On 7 June 2016, Polish Football Association selected six venues:
The capacities listed below were the tournament capacity and does not necessarily reflect the maximum capacity of the stadiums.

Opening match and Group A	Group A	Group B
Lublin	Kielce	Gdynia
Arena Lublin	Kolporter Arena	Stadion GOSiR
Capacity: 15,247	Capacity: 14,733	Capacity: 14,769

Group B	Group C, semifinal, and Final	Group C and semifinal	2017 UEFA European Under-21 Championship is located in Poland
Bydgoszcz	Kraków	Tychy	2017 UEFA European Under-21 Championship is located in Poland
Kompleks Sportowy Zawisza	Stadion Cracovia	Stadion Miejski	2017 UEFA European Under-21 Championship is located in Poland
Capacity: 11,585	Capacity: 14,715	Capacity: 14,805	2017 UEFA European Under-21 Championship is located in Poland

== Match officials ==
In February 2017, UEFA selected nine referees and their teams for this tournament.

Country	Referee	1st assistant referee	2nd assistant referee	Additional assistant referee	Additional assistant referee
Austria	Harald Lechner	Andreas Heidenreich	Maximilian Kolbitsch	Alexander Harkam	Julian Weinberger
Spain	Jesús Gil Manzano	Ángel Nevado Rodríguez	Diego Berbero Sevilla	Carlos del Cerro Grande	Juan Martínez Munuera
France	Benoît Bastien	Hicham Zakrani	Frédéric Haquette	Benoît Millot	Jérôme Miguelgorry
Germany	Tobias Stieler	Rafael Foltyn	Jan Seidel	Daniel Siebert	Benjamin Brand
Lithuania	Gediminas Mažeika	Vytautas Šimkus	Vytenis Kazlauskas	Donatas Rumšas	Robertas Valikonis
Netherlands	Serdar Gözübüyük	Bas van Dongen	Joost van Zuilen	Dennis Higler	Jeroen Manschot
Scotland	Bobby Madden	David McGeachie	Alastair Mather	Andrew Dallas	Donald Robertson
Slovakia	Ivan Kružliak	Tomáš Somoláni	Branislav Hancko	Peter Kráľovič	Filip Glova
Slovenia	Slavko Vinčić	Tomaž Klančnik	Andraž Kovačič	Rade Obrenović	Roberto Ponis

- 4th officials:

Country	4th official
Poland	Marcin Borkowski
Russia	Igor Demeshko
Israel	Roy Hassan
Poland	Michał Obukowicz

== Squads ==
Each national team had to submit a squad of 23 players, three of whom had to be goalkeepers. If a player was injured or ill severely enough to prevent his participation in the tournament before his team's first match, he could be replaced by another player.

== Group stage ==
The group winners and the best runner-up advanced to the semi-finals.

Tiebreakers

Teams were ranked according to points (3 points for a win, 1 point for a draw, 0 points for a loss), and if tied on points, the following tiebreaking criteria were applied, in the order given, to determine the rankings (Regulations Articles 18.01 and 18.02):

1. Points in head-to-head matches among tied teams;
2. Goal difference in head-to-head matches among tied teams;
3. Goals scored in head-to-head matches among tied teams;
4. If more than two teams are tied, and after applying all head-to-head criteria above, a subset of teams are still tied, all head-to-head criteria above are reapplied exclusively to this subset of teams;
5. Goal difference in all group matches;
6. Goals scored in all group matches;
7. Penalty shoot-out if only two teams had the same number of points, and they met in the last round of the group and are tied after applying all criteria above (not used if more than two teams had the same number of points, or if their rankings were not relevant for qualification for the next stage);
8. Disciplinary points (red card = 3 points, yellow card = 1 point, expulsion for two yellow cards in one match = 3 points);
9. UEFA coefficient for the final draw.

All times are local, CEST (UTC+2).

=== Group A ===
Pos	Team	Pld	W	D	L	GF	GA	GD	Pts	Qualification
1	England	3	2	1	0	5	1	+4	7	Knockout stage
2	Slovakia	3	2	0	1	6	3	+3	6	
3	Sweden	3	0	2	1	2	5	−3	2	
4	Poland (H)	3	0	1	2	3	7	−4	1	

Source: UEFA
Rules for classification: Group stage tiebreakers
(H) Hosts
16 June 2017
18:00

Sweden	0–0	England
	Report

Kolporter Arena, Kielce
Attendance: 11,672
Referee: Tobias Stieler (Germany)
16 June 2017
20:45

Poland	1–2	Slovakia
Lipski 1'	Report	Valjent 20'; Šafranko 78'

Arena Lublin, Lublin
Attendance: 14,911
Referee: Serdar Gözübüyük (Netherlands)

19 June 2017
18:00

Slovakia	1–2	England
Chrien 23'	Report	Mawson 50'; Redmond 61'

Kolporter Arena, Kielce
Attendance: 12,087
Referee: Gediminas Mažeika (Lithuania)
19 June 2017
20:45

Poland	2–2	Sweden
Moneta 6'; Kownacki 90+1' (pen.)	Report	Strandberg 36'; Une Larsson 41'

Arena Lublin, Lublin
Attendance: 14,651
Referee: Slavko Vinčić (Slovenia)

22 June 2017
20:45

England	3–0	Poland
Gray 6'; Murphy 69'; Baker 82' (pen.)	Report

Kolporter Arena, Kielce
Attendance: 13,176
Referee: Harald Lechner (Austria)
22 June 2017
20:45

Slovakia	3–0	Sweden
Chrien 5'; Mihalík 22'; Šatka 73'	Report

Arena Lublin, Lublin
Attendance: 11,203
Referee: Jesús Gil Manzano (Spain)

=== Group B ===
Pos	Team	Pld	W	D	L	GF	GA	GD	Pts	Qualification
1	Spain	3	3	0	0	9	1	+8	9	Knockout stage
2	Portugal	3	2	0	1	7	5	+2	6	
3	Serbia	3	0	1	2	2	5	−3	1	
4	Macedonia	3	0	1	2	4	11	−7	1	

Source: UEFA
Rules for classification: Group stage tiebreakers
17 June 2017
18:00

Portugal	2–0	Serbia
Guedes 37'; Fernandes 88'	Report

Kompleks Sportowy Zawisza, Bydgoszcz
Attendance: 10,724
Referee: Benoît Bastien (France)
17 June 2017
20:45

Spain	5–0	Macedonia
Saúl 10'; Asensio 16', 54', 72'; Deulofeu 35' (pen.)	Report

Stadion GOSiR, Gdynia
Attendance: 8,269
Referee: Harald Lechner (Austria)

20 June 2017
18:00

Serbia	2–2	Macedonia
Gaćinović 24'; Đurđević 90'	Report	Bardhi 64' (pen.); Gjorgjev 83'

Kompleks Sportowy Zawisza, Bydgoszcz
Attendance: 5,121
Referee: Bobby Madden (Scotland)
20 June 2017
20:45

Portugal	1–3	Spain
Bruma 77'	Report	Saúl 21'; Sandro 65'; Williams 90+3'

Stadion GOSiR, Gdynia
Attendance: 13,862
Referee: Tobias Stieler (Germany)

23 June 2017
20:45

Macedonia	2–4	Portugal
Bardhi 40'; Markoski 80'	Report	Edgar Ié 2'; Bruma 22', 90+1'; Podence 57'

Stadion GOSiR, Gdynia
Attendance: 7,533
Referee: Ivan Kružliak (Slovakia)
23 June 2017
20:45

Serbia	0–1	Spain
	Report	Suárez 38'

Kompleks Sportowy Zawisza, Bydgoszcz
Attendance: 12,058
Referee: Gediminas Mažeika (Lithuania)

=== Group C ===
Pos	Team	Pld	W	D	L	GF	GA	GD	Pts	Qualification
1	Italy	3	2	0	1	4	3	+1	6	Knockout stage
2	Germany	3	2	0	1	5	1	+4	6	Knockout stage
3	Denmark	3	1	0	2	4	7	−3	3	
4	Czech Republic	3	1	0	2	5	7	−2	3	

Source: UEFA
Rules for classification: Group stage tiebreakers
18 June 2017
18:00

Germany	2–0	Czech Republic
Meyer 44'; Gnabry 50'	Report

Stadion Miejski, Tychy
Attendance: 14,051
Referee: Jesús Gil Manzano (Spain)
18 June 2017
20:45

Denmark	0–2	Italy
	Report	Pellegrini 54'; Petagna 86'

Stadion Cracovia, Kraków
Attendance: 8,754
Referee: Ivan Kružliak (Slovakia)

21 June 2017
18:00

Czech Republic	3–1	Italy
Trávník 24'; Havlík 79'; Lüftner 85'	Report	Berardi 70'

Stadion Miejski, Tychy
Attendance: 13,251
Referee: Benoît Bastien (France)
21 June 2017
20:45

Germany	3–0	Denmark
Selke 53'; Kempf 73'; Amiri 79'	Report

Stadion Cracovia, Kraków
Attendance: 9,298
Referee: Serdar Gözübüyük (Netherlands)

24 June 2017
20:45

Italy	1–0	Germany
Bernardeschi 31'	Report

Stadion Cracovia, Kraków
Attendance: 14,039
Referee: Slavko Vinčić (Slovenia)
24 June 2017
20:45

Czech Republic	2–4	Denmark
Schick 27'; Chorý 54'	Report	L. Andersen 23'; Zohore 35', 73'; Ingvartsen 90+1'

Stadion Miejski, Tychy
Attendance: 9,047
Referee: Bobby Madden (Scotland)

=== Ranking of second-placed teams ===
Pos	Grp	Team	Pld	W	D	L	GF	GA	GD	Pts	Qualification
1	C	Germany	3	2	0	1	5	1	+4	6	Knockout stage
2	A	Slovakia	3	2	0	1	6	3	+3	6	
3	B	Portugal	3	2	0	1	7	5	+2	6	

Source: UEFA
Rules for classification: 1) points; 2) goal difference; 3) goals scored; 4) disciplinary points; 5) coefficient (Regulations Article 18.03).

The match-ups of the semi-finals depended on which runner-up qualified (Regulations Article 17.02):

Scenario according to the qualified team

Best runner-up from	Best runner-up plays	Other semi-final
Group A	Winner Group B	Winner Group A vs Winner Group C
Group B	Winner Group A	Winner Group B vs Winner Group C
Group C	Winner Group A	Winner Group B vs Winner Group C

== Knockout stage ==
In the knockout stage, extra time and a penalty shoot-out were used to decide the winner if necessary.

On 2 May 2016, the UEFA Executive Committee agreed that the competition would be part of the International Football Association Board's trial to allow a fourth substitute to be made during extra time.

=== Bracket ===
Semi-finals
27 June – Tychy
England	2 (3)
Germany (p)	2 (4)
27 June – Kraków
Spain	3
Italy	1

Final
30 June – Kraków
Germany	1
Spain	0

=== Semi-finals ===
27 June 2017
18:00

England	2–2 (a.e.t.)	Germany
Gray 41'; Abraham 50'	Report	Selke 35'; Platte 70'
Penalties
Baker (penalty scored); Abraham (penalty missed); Chilwell (penalty scored); Ward-Prowse (penalty scored); Redmond (penalty missed)	3–4	(penalty scored) Arnold; (penalty missed) Gerhardt; (penalty scored) Philipp; (penalty scored) Meyer; (penalty scored) Amiri

Stadion Miejski, Tychy
Attendance: 13,214
Referee: Gediminas Mažeika (Lithuania)

27 June 2017
21:00

Spain	3–1	Italy
Saúl 53', 65', 74'	Report	Bernardeschi 62'

Stadion Cracovia, Kraków
Attendance: 13,105
Referee: Slavko Vinčić (Slovenia)

=== Final ===
30 June 2017
20:45

Germany	1–0	Spain
Weiser 40'	Report

Stadion Cracovia, Kraków
Attendance: 14,059
Referee: Benoît Bastien (France)

== Goalscorers ==
There were 65 goals scored in 21 matches, for an average of 3.1 goals per match.

5 goals

- (Spain) Saúl

3 goals

- (Portugal) Bruma
- (Spain) Marco Asensio

2 goals

- (Denmark) Kenneth Zohore
- (England) Demarai Gray
- (Germany) Davie Selke
- (North Macedonia) Enis Bardhi
- (Slovakia) Martin Chrien
- (Italy) Federico Bernardeschi

1 goal

- (Czech Republic) Tomáš Chorý
- (Czech Republic) Marek Havlík
- (Czech Republic) Michael Lüftner
- (Czech Republic) Patrik Schick
- (Czech Republic) Michal Trávník
- (Denmark) Lucas Andersen
- (Denmark) Marcus Ingvartsen
- (England) Tammy Abraham
- (England) Lewis Baker
- (England) Alfie Mawson
- (England) Jacob Murphy
- (England) Nathan Redmond
- (Germany) Nadiem Amiri
- (Germany) Serge Gnabry
- (Germany) Marc-Oliver Kempf
- (Germany) Max Meyer
- (Germany) Felix Platte
- (Germany) Mitchell Weiser
- (Italy) Domenico Berardi
- (Italy) Lorenzo Pellegrini
- (Italy) Andrea Petagna
- (North Macedonia) Nikola Gjorgjev
- (North Macedonia) Kire Markoski
- (Poland) Dawid Kownacki
- (Poland) Patryk Lipski
- (Poland) Łukasz Moneta
- (Portugal) Bruno Fernandes
- (Portugal) Gonçalo Guedes
- (Portugal) Edgar Ié
- (Portugal) Daniel Podence
- (Serbia) Uroš Đurđević
- (Serbia) Mijat Gaćinović
- (Slovakia) Jaroslav Mihalík
- (Slovakia) Pavol Šafranko
- (Slovakia) Ľubomír Šatka
- (Slovakia) Martin Valjent
- (Spain) Gerard Deulofeu
- (Spain) Sandro
- (Spain) Iñaki Williams
- (Spain) Denis Suárez
- (Sweden) Jacob Une Larsson
- (Sweden) Carlos Strandberg

Source: UEFA.com

== Awards ==
The following awards were given at the conclusion of the tournament:

- Player of the Tournament: (Spain) Dani Ceballos
- Golden Boot: (Spain) Saúl

=== Team of the tournament ===
After the tournament, the Under-21 Team of the Tournament was selected by the UEFA Technical Observers.

Position	Player
Goalkeeper	(Germany) Julian Pollersbeck
Defenders	(Germany) Jeremy Toljan
Defenders	(Slovakia) Milan Škriniar
Defenders	(Germany) Niklas Stark
Defenders	(Germany) Yannick Gerhardt
Midfielders	(Germany) Maximilian Arnold
Midfielders	(Spain) Dani Ceballos
Midfielders	(Germany) Max Meyer
Midfielders	(Spain) Saúl
Forwards	(Spain) Marco Asensio
Forwards	(Italy) Federico Bernardeschi

== Sponsorship ==
- Booking.com
- Cinkciarz
- Hisense
- Volkswagen
