= Davide Cesarini =

Sammarinese footballer

Personal information
- Full name: Davide Cesarini
- Date of birth: February 16, 1995 (age 31)
- Place of birth: San Marino
- Position: Defender

Senior career*
Years	Team	Apps	(Gls)
2015–2023	S.P. Tre Penne	114	(4)
2019–2020	→ Pietracuta (loan)	0	(0)

International career^{‡}
2011	San Marino U17	3	(0)
2012	San Marino U19	3	(0)
2013–2015	San Marino U21	14	(1)
2015–2022	San Marino	16	(0)
- * Club domestic league appearances and goals as of 31 May 2025 ‡ National team caps and goals as of 10 June 2022

Davide Cesarini (born 16 February 1995) is a Sammarinese footballer who last played for S.P. Tre Penne.

== Personal life ==
Cesarini studied physiotherapy.
