= Paula Kerger =

American media executive (born 1957)

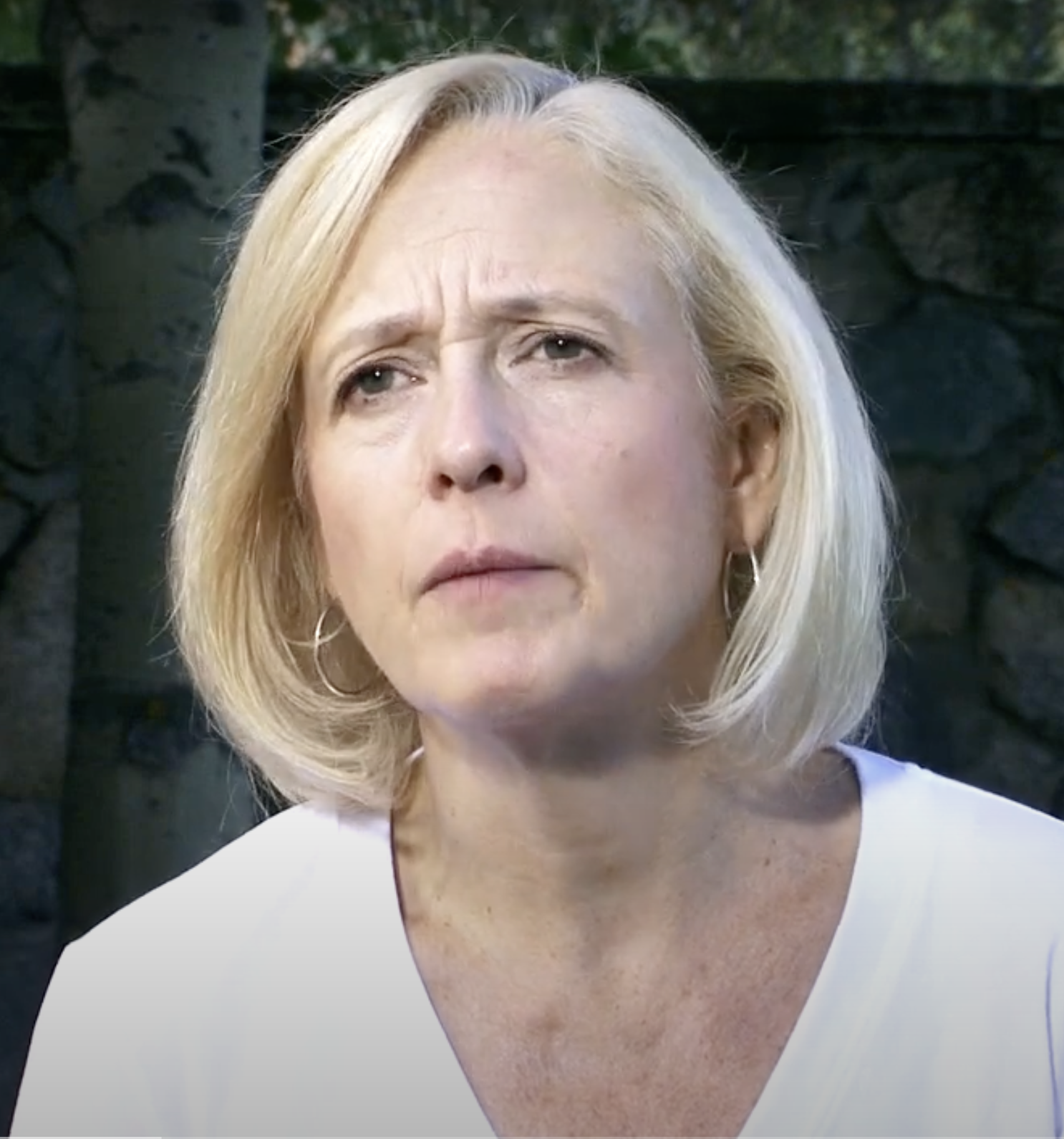
- Kerger in 2012
- Born: December 20, 1957 (age 67)
- Education: University of Baltimore (BS)
- Occupation: Media executive
- Title: President and CEO of PBS

Paula Kerger (born December 20, 1957) is an American media executive who has served as president and chief executive officer of PBS since 2006.

== Early life and education ==
Kerger grew up outside Baltimore, Maryland, where her grandfather, a college physics professor, helped found the city's public radio station. She attended the University of Baltimore as a pre-med student before switching to business, graduating with a Bachelor of Science in 1979.

== Career ==
After graduating, Kerger was hired as a program development officer for UNICEF. She continued working in the nonprofit sector, becoming director of principal gifts for the Metropolitan Opera in 1989. Her first job in public media was as development director for the New York area public television station WNET, where she began working in 1993. She became WNET's station manager in 2000, then chief operating officer of its parent company in 2004.

Kerger became PBS' president and CEO in March 2006. In 2011, she initiated distribution deals with British channels Sky UK and Virgin Media. Kerger has sought to expand PBS' digital presence, launching the streaming service PBS Passport and brokering a distribution deal with YouTube TV. During the COVID-19 pandemic, she partnered with public school systems to offer programming that complemented distance learning programs.

In 2024, PBS' board of directors extended Kerger's contract for five years. She is the network's longest serving chief executive and the second woman to serve in the role.

In March 2025, Kerger testified in a House Subcommittee on Delivering on Government Efficiency hearing, defending PBS' federal funding. She has criticized the Trump administration's funding cuts and lobbied against them, saying there is no "white knight" who will save public broadcasting.
