= Kevin Kerger =

Luxembourgish footballer

Personal information
- Full name: Kevin Kerger
- Date of birth: 17 November 1994 (age 31)
- Height: 1.80 m (5 ft 11 in)
- Position: Left back

Team information
- Current team: Mamer 32
- Number: 49

Youth career
- FC Koerich
- 2010–2012: ES Clemency

Senior career*
Years	Team	Apps	(Gls)
2012–2013	Mamer 32	4	(1)
2013–2017	UNA Strassen	86	(5)
2018–2021	Progrès Niederkorn	28	(2)
2019–2021	Union Titus Pétange (loan)	19	(1)
2021–2022	Union Titus Pétange	14	(0)
2022–2023	FC UNA Strassen	10	(0)
2023–2024	Racing FC	27	(0)
2024–	Mamer 32	31	(0)

International career
2012	Luxembourg U19	3	(0)
2015–2016	Luxembourg U21	11	(1)
2016	Luxembourg	1	(0)
- * Club domestic league appearances and goals as of 5 June 2026

Kevin Kerger (born 17 November 1994) is a Luxembourgish international footballer who plays club football for Mamer 32, as a left back.

== Career ==
Kerger has played club football for FC Mamer 32 and FC UNA Strassen. In July 2022 he moved back to his former club FC UNA Strassen.

He made his international debut for Luxembourg in 2016. It was his only game for the national team.
