= List of Austrian football transfers winter 2023–24 =

This is a list of Austrian football transfers for the 2023–24 winter transfer window. Only transfers featuring Austrian Football Bundesliga are listed.

== Austrian Football Bundesliga ==
Note: Flags indicate national team as has been defined under FIFA eligibility rules. Players may hold more than one non-FIFA nationality.

=== Red Bull Salzburg ===
In:

No.	Pos.	Nation	Player
4	DF	GER	Hendry Blank (from (Germany) Borussia Dortmund II)
13	GK	GER	Timo Horn (free agent)
25	DF	AUT	Flavius Daniliuc (on loan from (Italy) Salernitana)
—	FW	MLI	Gaoussou Diakité (from (Mali) Guidars)

Out:

No.	Pos.	Nation	Player
1	GK	GER	Nico Mantl (on loan to (Denmark) Viborg)
4	DF	POL	Kamil Piątkowski (on loan to (Spain) Granada)
8	MF	AUT	Dijon Kameri (on loan to (Switzerland) Grasshoppers)
—	FW	SUI	Federico Crescenti (on loan to SW Bregenz)
—	FW	MLI	Gaoussou Diakité (on loan to Liefering)
—	DF	BRA	Douglas Mendes (on loan to (Brazil) Red Bull Bragantino, previously on loan at Liefering)
—	MF	AUT	Raphael Hofer (on loan to Liefering, previously on loan at Blau-Weiß Linz)
—	FW	GHA	Daniel Owusu (to (Georgia (country)) Samtredia, previously on loan at Amstetten)

=== Sturm Graz ===
In:

No.	Pos.	Nation	Player
16	GK	CZE	Vítězslav Jaroš (on loan from (England) Liverpool)
18	FW	DEN	Mika Biereth (on loan from (England) Arsenal, previously on loan at (Scotland) Motherwell)

Out:

No.	Pos.	Nation	Player
17	FW	CPV	Bryan Teixeira (on loan to (Germany) 1. FC Magdeburg)
23	MF	AUT	Vesel Demaku (on loan to SCR Altach)
29	FW	GHA	Mohammed Fuseini (on loan to (Denmark) Randers)
44	DF	MLI	Amadou Danté (on loan to (Switzerland) Zürich)
—	FW	AUT	Christoph Lang (to Rapid Wien, previously on loan at Hartberg)

=== LASK ===
In:

No.	Pos.	Nation	Player
4	DF	UKR	Maksym Talovyerov (from (Czech Republic) Slavia Prague, previously on loan)
14	MF	KOS	Valon Berisha (free agent)
17	FW	NGA	Moses Usor (from (Czech Republic) Slavia Prague, previously on loan)
37	FW	GER	Lucas Copado (from (Germany) Bayern Munich II)
—	DF	MKD	Metodi Maksimov (from (North Macedonia) Shkëndija)

Out:

No.	Pos.	Nation	Player
11	FW	SEN	Moussa Koné (on loan to (Slovakia) DAC Dunajská Streda)
14	FW	AUT	Husein Balić (to (Poland) ŁKS Łódź)
15	FW	AUT	Tobias Anselm (on loan to (Germany) Viktoria Köln)
27	MF	AUT	Thomas Goiginger (to (Germany) VfL Osnabrück)
55	MF	GAM	Ebrima Darboe (loan return to (Italy) Roma)
—	DF	MKD	Metodi Maksimov (on loan to (Norway) Aalesund)

=== Rapid Wien ===
In:

No.	Pos.	Nation	Player
10	FW	AUT	Christoph Lang (from Sturm Graz, previously on loan at Hartberg)
22	FW	SWE	Isak Jansson (on loan from (Spain) Cartagena)
—	FW	AUT	Noah Bischof (from SCR Altach)

Out:

No.	Pos.	Nation	Player
4	MF	AUT	Patrick Greil (to (Germany) SV Sandhausen)
10	FW	GER	Nicolas-Gerrit Kühn (to (Scotland) Celtic)
14	MF	SRB	Aleksa Pejić (to (Serbia) TSC)
29	FW	AUT	Ante Bajic (to Ried)
—	FW	AUT	Noah Bischof (on loan to First Vienna)

=== Austria Wien ===
In:

No.	Pos.	Nation	Player
41	DF	GER	Frans Krätzig (on loan from (Germany) Bayern Munich)

Out:

No.	Pos.	Nation	Player
5	DF	ISR	Matan Baltaxa (to (Israel) Maccabi Tel Aviv)
23	MF	AUT	Matthias Braunöder (on loan to (Italy) Como)
77	MF	AUT	Aleksandar Jukić (to (Russia) Sochi)
—	MF	AUT	Sanel Saljic (on loan to Stripfing)
—	FW	AUT	Lukas Haubenwaller (on loan to SC Neusiedl/See, previously on loan at Stripfing)

=== Austria Klagenfurt ===
In:

No.	Pos.	Nation	Player
6	MF	MAR	Ali Loune (on loan from (Germany) 1. FC Nürnberg)
23	MF	GER	Max Besuschkow (on loan from (Germany) Hannover 96)
99	FW	CRO	Anton Maglica (from (Bosnia and Herzegovina) Zrinjski Mostar)
—	MF	GER	Laurenz Dehl (from (Germany) Union Berlin)
—	FW	MKD	David Toshevski (free agent)

Out:

No.	Pos.	Nation	Player
16	MF	GER	Iba May (on loan to (Germany) Viktoria Berlin)
81	MF	TUR	Turgay Gemicibaşi (to (Turkey) Göztepe)
—	MF	GER	Laurenz Dehl (on loan to (Germany) Viktoria Berlin)
—	FW	MKD	David Toshevski (on loan to (Croatia) Šibenik)

=== Wolfsberger AC ===
In:

No.	Pos.	Nation	Player
5	DF	CIV	Cheick Mamadou Diabaté (from (Israel) Maccabi Petah Tikva)
12	FW	CIV	Sankara Karamoko (from (Ivory Coast) ASEC Mimosas)
15	FW	AUT	Michael Morgenstern (from Lendorf)

Out:

No.	Pos.	Nation	Player
5	DF	GER	Kevin Bukusu (to (Lithuania) Žalgiris)
12	FW	CIV	Mohamed Bamba (to (France) Lorient)

=== Austria Lustenau ===
In:

No.	Pos.	Nation	Player
12	MF	CRO	Leo Mikić (from (South Korea) Jeonnam Dragons)
13	DF	BRA	Matheus Lins (from SW Bregenz)
20	MF	GER	Nico Gorzel (free agent)
25	MF	GER	Paterson Chato (from (Germany) VfL Osnabrück)
55	DF	AUT	Luca Meisl (from (Belgium) Beerschot)

Out:

No.	Pos.	Nation	Player
2	DF	MTQ	Boris Moltenis (to (France) Sochaux)
9	FW	DEN	Nikolai Baden (loan return to (Netherlands) Vitesse)
20	MF	FRA	Jonathan Schmid (to (Luxembourg) Progrès Niederkorn)

=== WSG Tirol ===
In:

No.	Pos.	Nation	Player

Out:

No.	Pos.	Nation	Player
77	MF	AUT	Julius Ertlthaler (to (Poland) GKS Tychy)

=== Hartberg ===
In:

No.	Pos.	Nation	Player
19	MF	AUT	Onurhan Babuşcu (on loan from (Turkey) Gaziantep)

Out:

No.	Pos.	Nation	Player
4	MF	AUT	Maximilian Sellinger (to Scheiblingkirchen-Warth)
19	FW	AUT	Jürgen Lemmerer (on loan to Amstetten)
22	DF	CRO	Marin Karamarko (to (Russia) Arsenal Tula)
26	FW	AUT	Christoph Lang (loan return to Sturm Graz)

=== SCR Altach ===
In:

No.	Pos.	Nation	Player
11	FW	FRA	Sofian Bahloul (from (Switzerland) Wil)
14	MF	AUT	Vesel Demaku (on loan from Sturm Graz)
16	FW	MLI	Ousmane Diawara (from (Sweden) Landskrona)
22	DF	AUT	Pascal Estrada (from (Slovenia) Olimpija Ljubljana)

Out:

No.	Pos.	Nation	Player
7	FW	AUT	Noah Bischof (to Rapid Wien)
11	FW	HUN	Csaba Bukta (free agent)
19	DF	AUT	Sebastian Aigner (to SW Bregenz)
22	FW	AUT	Amir Abdijanovic (to SV Horn)

=== Blau-Weiß Linz ===
In:

No.	Pos.	Nation	Player
11	FW	BRA	João Luiz (from SW Bregenz)

Out:

No.	Pos.	Nation	Player
3	DF	AUT	Erwin Softic (on loan to SV Wallern)
11	MF	AUT	Raphael Hofer (loan return to Red Bull Salzburg)
21	GK	AUT	Felix Gschossmann (on loan to St. Pölten)

== See also ==
- 2023–24 Austrian Football Bundesliga
