= 2023 UEFA European Under-21 Championship qualification Group H =

Football tournament qualification stage

Group H of the 2023 UEFA European Under-21 Championship qualifying competition consisted of six teams: France, Serbia, Ukraine, North Macedonia, Faroe Islands, and Armenia. The composition of the nine groups in the qualifying group stage was decided by the draw held on 28 January 2021, 12:00 CET (UTC+1), at the UEFA headquarters in Nyon, Switzerland, with the teams seeded according to their coefficient ranking.

== Standings ==
Pos	Team	Pld	W	D	L	GF	GA	GD	Pts	Qualification	France	Ukraine	Serbia	Faroe Islands	North Macedonia	Armenia
1	France	10	8	2	0	31	5	+26	26	Final tournament	—	5–0	2–0	2–0	3–0	7–0
2	Ukraine	10	7	2	1	20	11	+9	23	Play-offs	3–3	—	2–1	1–0	4–0	2–1
3	Serbia	10	3	3	4	10	11	−1	12		0–3	0–1	—	0–0	2–1	2–0
4	Faroe Islands	10	2	4	4	6	12	−6	10		1–1	0–4	1–1	—	1–1	2–0
5	North Macedonia	10	2	3	5	8	15	−7	9		0–1	1–1	0–0	0–1	—	3–1
6	Armenia	10	1	0	9	7	28	−21	3		1–4	0–2	1–4	2–0	1–2	—

Source: UEFA
Rules for classification: Tiebreakers

== Matches ==
Times are CET/CEST, (Note: CEST (UTC+2) for dates between 31 March and 26 October 2021 and between 29 March and 24 October 2022, and CET (UTC+1) for all other dates.) as listed by UEFA (local times, if different, are in parentheses).

8 June 2021
18:30 (17:30 WET)

Faroe Islands	2–0	Armenia
Johannesen 68', 84'	Report

Tofta Leikvøllur, Toftir
Attendance: 0
Referee: Robert Ian Jenkins (Wales)

2 September 2021
16:30 (18:30 AMT)

Armenia	2–0	Faroe Islands
Grigoryan 40'; Mirzoyan 85' (pen.)	Report

Yerevan Football Academy Stadium, Yerevan
Attendance: 900
Referee: Dzmitry Dzmitryieu (Belarus)
2 September 2021
18:30

France	3–0	North Macedonia
Mbuku 26'; Camavinga 50'; Kalulu 89'	Report

MMArena, Le Mans
Attendance: 2,311
Referee: Juri Frischer (Estonia)

3 September 2021
18:00

Serbia	0–1	Ukraine
	Report	Kryskiv 14'

Sportski centar FSS, Stara Pazova
Attendance: 212
Referee: Balázs Berke (Hungary)

6 September 2021
18:30 (17:30 WET)

Faroe Islands	1–1	France
Løkin 55'	Report	Gouiri 8'

Tofta Leikvøllur, Toftir
Attendance: 496
Referee: Volen Chinkov (Belarus)

7 September 2021
16:00

North Macedonia	0–0	Serbia
	Report

SRC Biljanini Izvori, Ohrid
Attendance: 450
Referee: Dumitri Muntean (Moldova)
7 September 2021
18:00 (19:00 EEST)

Ukraine	2–1	Armenia
Kryskiv 20'; Mudryk 62'	Report	Galstyan 45+4'

Kolos Stadium, Kovalivka
Attendance: 2,940
Referee: Kristoffer Karlsson (Sweden)

7 October 2021
16:00 (15:00 WET)

Faroe Islands	1–1	North Macedonia
Johansen 8'	Report	Gjorgjievski 55'

Tofta Leikvøllur, Toftir
Attendance: 786
Referee: Ferenc Karakó (Hungary)
7 October 2021
16:00 (18:00 AMT)

Armenia	1–4	Serbia
Mirzoyan 36'	Report	Eraković 56'; Terzić 85'; Tedić 88'; Gavrić 90+6'

Yerevan Football Academy Stadium, Yerevan
Attendance: 430
Referee: Ivar Orri Kristjansson (Iceland)

8 October 2021
18:30

France	5–0	Ukraine
Kalimuendo 40'; Diop 43'; Adli 54'; Cherki 68', 80'	Report

Stade Francis-Le Blé, Brest
Attendance: 4,546
Referee: Nick Walsh (Scotland)

12 October 2021
16:00 (18:00 AMT)

Armenia	1–2	North Macedonia
Grigoryan 90'	Report	Gjorgjievski 25'; Maksimov 83'

Yerevan Football Academy Stadium, Yerevan
Attendance: 460
Referee: Loukas Sotiriou (Cyprus)
12 October 2021
17:00 (18:00 EEST)

Ukraine	1–0	Faroe Islands
Edmundsson 24' (o.g.)	Report

Slavutych-Arena, Zaporizhzhia
Attendance: 1,470
Referee: Mario Zebec (Croatia)
12 October 2021
18:30

Serbia	0–3	France
	Report	Adli 28'; Gouiri 43' (pen.); Cherki 87'

Partizan Stadium, Belgrade
Attendance: 50
Referee: Nicolas Laforge (Belgium)

11 November 2021
13:00

North Macedonia	1–1	Ukraine
Grozdanovski 58'	Report	Syrota 43'

FFM Training Centre, Skopje
Attendance: 482
Referee: Sigurd Kringstad (Norway)
11 November 2021
20:45

France	7–0	Armenia
Caqueret 11'; Diop 27', 50'; Cherki 35'; Kalimuendo 58', 70'; Le Fée 82'	Report

Stade des Alpes, Grenoble
Attendance: 6,839
Referee: Andrei Chivulete (Romania)

12 November 2021
18:00

Serbia	0–0	Faroe Islands
	Report

Karađorđe Stadium, Novi Sad
Attendance: 372
Referee: Adam Ladebäck (Sweden)

16 November 2021
17:00 (18:00 EET)

Ukraine	2–1	Serbia
Kryskiv 9'; Sudakov 81'	Report	Mitrović 78'

Arena Lviv, Lviv
Attendance: 4,771
Referee: Ádám Farkas (Hungary)
16 November 2021
18:30

North Macedonia	0–1	France
	Report	Kalulu 75'

Toše Proeski Arena, Skopje
Attendance: 723
Referee: Arda Kardeşler (Turkey)

24 March 2022
17:00

Serbia	2–1	North Macedonia
Pantović 9'; Jović 82'	Report	Dimovski 83'

Voždovac Stadium, Belgrade
Attendance: 402
Referee: Michal Očenáš (Slovakia)
24 March 2022
20:45

France	2–0	Faroe Islands
Camavinga 23'; Johannesen 82' (o.g.)	Report

Stade de l'Épopée, Calais
Attendance: 7,823
Referee: Luka Bilbija (Bosnia and Herzegovina)

29 March 2022
16:00

Serbia	2–0	Armenia
Kamenović 40'; Terzić 45+2'	Report

TSC Arena, Bačka Topola
Attendance: 811
Referee: Gal Leibovitz (Israel)
29 March 2022
18:00

North Macedonia	0–1	Faroe Islands
	Report	Radosavljević 52' (pen.)

Toše Proeski Arena, Skopje
Attendance: 200
Referee: Daniyar Sakhi (Kazakhstan)

1 June 2022
19:00 (18:00 WET)

Faroe Islands	0–4	Ukraine
	Report	Bondarenko 28'; Supryaha 33'; Vivcharenko 54'; Sudakov 62'

Tórsvøllur, Tórshavn
Attendance: 675
Referee: Kristoffer Hagenes (Norway)

2 June 2022
17:00

North Macedonia	3–1	Armenia
Maksimov 22'; Ilievski 85'; Emini 90+7' (pen.)	Report	Simonyan 9'

FFM Training Centre, Skopje
Attendance: 167
Referee: Nicolas Laforge (Belgium)
2 June 2022
20:45

France	2–0	Serbia
Thuram 42'; Gouiri 60'	Report

Stade des Alpes, Grenoble
Attendance: 10,101
Referee: Donald Robertson (Scotland)

5 June 2022
18:45 (19:45 TRT)

Ukraine	4–0	North Macedonia
Viunnyk 69'; Sudakov 71'; Vanat 85', 90+4'	Report

Esenyurt Necmi Kadıoğlu Stadium, Istanbul (Turkey)
Attendance: 81
Referee: Goga Kikacheishvili (Georgia)

6 June 2022
18:30 (20:30 AMT)

Armenia	1–4	France
Shaghoyan 69'	Report	Le Fée 21', 76'; Gouiri 66' (pen.); Gusto 89'

Yerevan Football Academy Stadium, Yerevan
Attendance: 1,300
Referee: Joni Hyytiä (Finland)

7 June 2022
17:15 (16:15 WET)

Faroe Islands	1–1	Serbia
Nielsen 55'	Report	Mitrović 77'

Við Djúpumýrar, Klaksvík
Attendance: 569
Referee: Tomas Klima (Czech Republic)

9 June 2022
18:45 (19:45 TRT)

Ukraine	3–3	France
Vanat 7'; Badiashile 44' (o.g.); Bondarenko 50'	Report	Abline 3'; Thuram 10'; Gouiri 25'

Esenyurt Necmi Kadıoğlu Stadium, Istanbul (Turkey)
Attendance: 189
Referee: Vassilis Fotias (Greece)

12 June 2022
17:00 (19:00 AMT)

Armenia	0–2	Ukraine
	Report	Kuliyev 49'; Vivcharenko 68'

Yerevan Football Academy Stadium, Yerevan
Attendance: 450
Referee: Tom Owen (Wales)

== Goalscorers ==
There were 82 goals scored in 30 matches, for an average of 2.73 goals per match.

5 goals

- (France) Amine Gouiri

4 goals

- (France) Rayan Cherki

3 goals

- (France) Sofiane Diop
- (France) Arnaud Kalimuendo
- (France) Enzo Le Fée
- (Ukraine) Dmytro Kryskiv
- (Ukraine) Heorhiy Sudakov
- (Ukraine) Vladyslav Vanat

2 goals

- (Armenia) Narek Grigoryan
- (Armenia) Mikayel Mirzoyan
- (Faroe Islands) Jonn Johannesen
- (France) Amine Adli
- (France) Eduardo Camavinga
- (France) Pierre Kalulu
- (France) Khéphren Thuram
- (North Macedonia) Marko Gjorgjievski
- (North Macedonia) Metodi Maksimov
- (Serbia) Stefan Mitrović
- (Serbia) Nikola Terzić
- (Ukraine) Artem Bondarenko
- (Ukraine) Kostyantyn Vivcharenko

1 goal

- (Armenia) Arsen Galstyan
- (Armenia) Zhirayr Shaghoyan
- (Armenia) Erik Simonyan
- (Faroe Islands) Andrass Johansen
- (Faroe Islands) Steffan Løkin
- (Faroe Islands) Jørgen Nielsen
- (Faroe Islands) Stefan Radosavljević
- (France) Matthis Abline
- (France) Maxence Caqueret
- (France) Malo Gusto
- (France) Nathanaël Mbuku
- (North Macedonia) Bojan Dimoski
- (North Macedonia) Sefer Emini
- (North Macedonia) Tomche Grozdanovski
- (North Macedonia) Mario Ilievski
- (Serbia) Strahinja Eraković
- (Serbia) Željko Gavrić
- (Serbia) Nemanja Jović
- (Serbia) Dimitrije Kamenović
- (Serbia) Miloš Pantović
- (Serbia) Slobodan Tedić
- (Ukraine) Eldar Kuliyev
- (Ukraine) Mykhailo Mudryk
- (Ukraine) Vladyslav Supryaha
- (Ukraine) Oleksandr Syrota
- (Ukraine) Bohdan Viunnyk

1 own goal

- (Faroe Islands) Andrias Edmundsson (against Ukraine)
- (Faroe Islands) Áki Johannesen (against France)
- (France) Benoît Badiashile (against Ukraine)
