= 2026–27 SV Zulte Waregem season =

SV Zulte Waregem
2026–27 season
- Stadium: Elindus Arena
- Belgian Pro League: Pre-season
- Belgian Cup: Pre-season

The 2026–27 season is the 26th season in the history of Sportvereniging Zulte Waregem and their second consecutive season in the Belgian Pro League. The club will also compete in the Belgian Cup.

== Transfers ==
=== In ===
Pos.	Player	Transferred from	Fee	Date	Source
MF	(France) Marley Aké	(Switzerland) Yverdon Sport	Loan made permanent	1 July 2026	
FW	(Belgium) Hemsley Akpa-Chukwu	(Belgium) RFC Seraing	Undisclosed	1 July 2026	

=== Out ===
Pos.	Player	Transferred to	Fee	Date	Source
DF	(Belgium) Andres Labie	(Belgium) Beerschot	Loan return	30 June 2026	
MF	(Denmark) Jeppe Erenbjerg	(Belgium) Genk	Undisclosed	1 July 2026	
GK	(Netherlands) Ennio van der Gouw	(Portugal) Rio Ave	Loan made permanent	1 July 2026	
MF	(Cyprus) Stavros Gavriil	(Portugal) Nacional	Free	2 July 2026	

== Pre-season and friendlies ==
27 June 2026 Friendly	Racing Waregem (Belgium)	0–6	(Belgium) Zulte Waregem
14:00			Sall 44'; Seven 69'; Ementa 70', 74'; Hedl 79'; Lofolomo 82'

3 July 2026 Friendly	Oudenaarde (Belgium)	0–3	(Belgium) Zulte Waregem	Oudenaarde
18:00			Vemba 1'; Aké 18'; Van Keymolen 51'	Stadium: Thienpontstadion

4 July 2026 Friendly	KVV Zelzate (Belgium)	1–2	(Belgium) Zulte Waregem
16:00	63'		Aké 21'; Hedl 51'

8 July 2026 Friendly	Zulte Waregem (Belgium)	4–3	(Poland) Raków Częstochowa	Netherlands
11:30	Hedl 7', 17'; Opoku 46'; Aké 50'		Basse 21', 25', 60'

11 July 2026 Friendly	Kryvbas Kryvyi Rih (Ukraine)	1–2	(Belgium) Zulte Waregem
11:30

18 July 2026 Friendly	Zulte Waregem (Belgium)	1–1	(Netherlands) AZ Alkmaar
20:00	Hedl 33'		80'

25 July 2026 Friendly	Zulte Waregem (Belgium)	3–2	(Netherlands) Sparta Rotterdam
14:30

== Competitions ==
=== Overall record ===
Competition	First match	Last match	Starting round	Record							
Competition	First match	Last match	Starting round	Pld	W	D	L	GF	GA	GD	Win %
Belgian Pro League	7 August 2026		Matchday 1	0	0	0	0	0	0	+0	—
Belgian Cup				0	0	0	0	0	0	+0	—
Total				0	0	0	0	0	0	+0	—

Source: Competitions

=== Belgian Pro League ===
Pos	Team	Pld	W	D	L	GF	GA	GD	Pts
5	Anderlecht	1	1	0	0	2	1	+1	3
6	Antwerp	1	1	0	0	2	1	+1	3
7	Zulte Waregem	1	1	0	0	2	1	+1	3
8	Cercle Brugge	2	0	2	0	5	5	0	2
9	Sint-Truiden	2	0	2	0	4	4	0	2

Updated to match(es) played on 14 August 2026. Source: Jupiler Pro League (in Dutch)
Rules for classification: 1) Points; 2) Matches won; 3) Goal difference; 4) Goals scored; 5) Away matches won; 6) Away goal difference; 7) Away goals scored; 8) Play-off.
