= Benjamin Böckle =

Austrian footballer

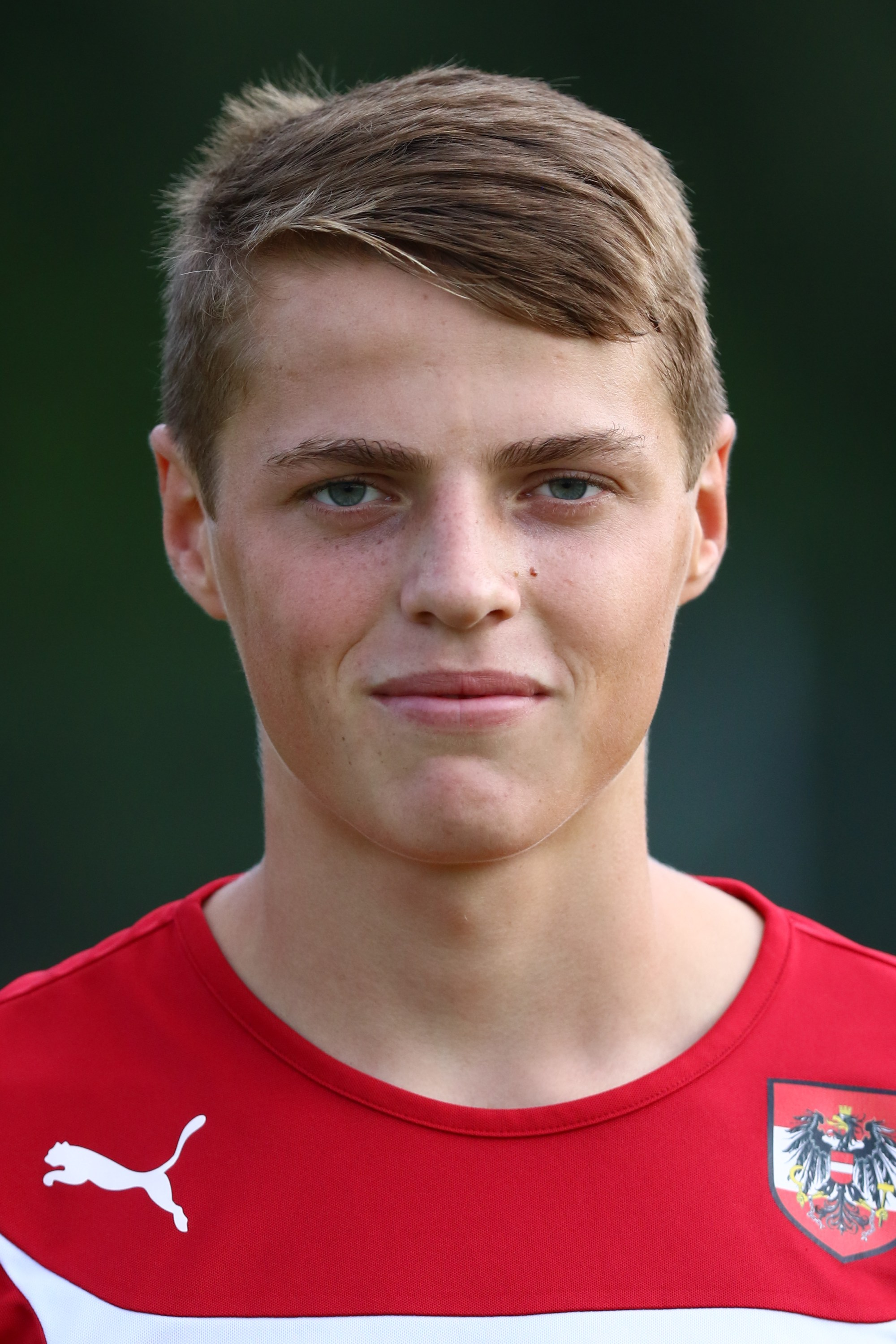
- Böckle in 2018

Personal information
- Date of birth: 17 June 2002 (age 24)
- Place of birth: Dornbirn, Austria
- Height: 1.88 m (6 ft 2 in)
- Position: Defender

Team information
- Current team: SCR Altach
- Number: 37

Youth career
- Red Bull Salzburg

Senior career*
Years	Team	Apps	(Gls)
2020–2022	Liefering	27	(1)
2022–2024	Fortuna Düsseldorf	6	(0)
2022–2024	Fortuna Düsseldorf II	12	(0)
2023–2024	→ Preußen Münster (loan)	27	(0)
2024–2026	Rapid Wien	7	(0)
2024–2026	Rapid Wien II	6	(1)
2025–2026	→ WSG Tirol (loan)	29	(2)
2026–	SCR Altach	3	(0)

International career^{‡}
2017	Austria U15	3	(0)
2017–2018	Austria U16	7	(1)
2018–2019	Austria U17	14	(2)
2019–2020	Austria U18	4	(0)
2024	Austria U21	5	(0)
- * Club domestic league appearances and goals as of 10 June 2026 ‡ National team caps and goals as of 15 October 2024

Benjamin Böckle (born 17 June 2002) is an Austrian professional footballer who plays as a defender for Austrian Bundesliga club SCR Altach.

== Club career ==
On 17 June 2022, Böckle signed a three-year contract with Fortuna Düsseldorf in Germany.

On 30 August 2023, Böckle joined Preußen Münster in 3. Liga on loan.

On 24 June 2024, Böckle returned to Austria and joined Rapid Wien on a three-season deal.

On 7 July 2025, Böckle joined WSG Tirol on loan for the 2025–26 season.

== Career statistics ==
=== Club ===
As of match played 24 May 2025

Appearances and goals by club, season and competition
Club	Season	League			Cup		Continental		Total	
Club	Season	Division	Apps	Goals	Apps	Goals	Apps	Goals	Apps	Goals
Liefering	2020–21	Austrian Second League	14	0	0	0	—	—	14	0
Liefering	2021-22	Austrian Second League	13	1	0	0	—	—	13	1
Liefering	Total		27	1	0	0	—	—	27	1
Fortuna Düsseldorf	2022-23	2. Bundesliga	6	0	1	0	—	—	7	0
Fortuna Düsseldorf	2023-24	2. Bundesliga								
Fortuna Düsseldorf	Total		6	0	1	0	—	—	7	0
Fortuna Düsseldorf II	2022-23	Regionalliga West	12	0	—		—		12	0
Preußen Münster	2023–24	3. Liga	27	0	1	0	—		28	0
Rapid Wien	2024–25	Austrian Bundesliga	7	0	3	0	3 (Note: Appearances in UEFA Conference League)	0	13	0
Rapid Wien II	2024–25	2. Liga	6	0	—		—		6	0
Career total			85	1	5	0	3	0	93	1
