= North Macedonia national under-21 football team =

Macedonia Under-21
- Nickname: The Red Lions (Црвени лавови)
- Association: Football Federation of Macedonia
- Confederation: UEFA (Europe)
- Head coach: Goran Stanić
- Captain: Mario Ilievski
- Most caps: Mario Ilievski (31)
- Top scorer: Samir Fazli (7); Mario Ilievski (7); Dimitar Mitrovski (7)
- Home stadium: Petar Miloshevski TC
- FIFA code: MKD
First colours	Second colours

First international
- Unofficial; Macedonia 7–0 Estonia (Skopje, 31 May 1994); Official; Macedonia 5–3 Denmark (Kočani, 7 September 1994)

Biggest win
- Unofficial; Macedonia 7–0 Estonia (Skopje, 31 May 1994); Official; North Macedonia 7–1 Faroe Islands (Skopje, 10 September 2019)

Biggest defeat
- Macedonia 0–8 FR Yugoslavia (Skopje, 7 September 1999)

UEFA U-21 Championship
- Appearances: 1 (first in 2017)
- Best result: Group stage (2017)

The Macedonia national under-21 football team is a youth association football national team which represents Macedonia at this age level and is a feeder team for the Macedonia national football team. It was formerly known as the Macedonia national under-21 football team.

This team is for Macedonian players aged 21 or under at the start of a two-year UEFA European Under-21 Championship campaign, so players can be, and often are, up to 23 years old. Also in existence are teams for Under-20s (for non-UEFA tournaments), Under-19s and Under 17s. As long as they are eligible, players can play at any level, making it possible to play for the U21s, senior side and again for the U21s. It is also possible to play for one country at youth level and another at senior level (providing the player is eligible).

The under-21 age category came into existence with the realignment of UEFA's youth competitions in 1976. The Macedonia U21 team was formed following Macedonia's independence from SFR Yugoslavia in 1991 and is controlled by the Football Federation of Macedonia (from 1976 to 1992 Macedonian players played for Yugoslavia U21). A 7–0 win in a friendly against Estonia played on 31 May 1994 was Macedonia U21s' first result. Four months later, Macedonia also had their first competitive match which ended in a 5–3 win against Denmark.

So far, the team has qualified for one final tournament, the one being the 2017 Euro U21 held in Poland for players born 1994 or later. They ended the tournament on the 11th position with 1 draw and 2 losses over the group stage.

== UEFA U-21 Championship Record ==
UEFA U-21 Championship record									UEFA U-21 Championship Qualification record							Manager(s)
Year	Round	Pld	W	D	L	GF	GA	GD	Pld	W	D	L	GF	GA	GD	
(Spain) 1996	Did not qualify								10	4	0	6	16	27	−11	Jovo Nikushev
(Romania) 1998	Did not qualify								8	1	1	6	3	17	−14	Zoran Smileski
(Slovakia) 2000	Did not qualify								8	1	0	7	2	25	−23	Perica Gruevski, Blagoja Kitanovski
(Switzerland) 2002	Did not qualify								10	1	2	7	6	18	−12	Blagoja Kitanovski, Nikola Ilievski
(Germany) 2004	Did not qualify								8	0	1	7	4	23	−19	Zharko Odjakov, Mirsad Jonuz
(Portugal) 2006	Did not qualify								12	2	3	5	9	18	−9	Mirsad Jonuz
(Netherlands) 2007	Did not qualify								4	2	0	2	6	6	0	Mirsad Jonuz
(Sweden) 2009	Did not qualify								8	2	3	3	5	6	−1	Mirsad Jonuz
(Denmark) 2011	Did not qualify								8	0	2	6	9	19	−10	Mirsad Jonuz, Boban Babunski
(Israel) 2013	Did not qualify								8	3	3	2	14	15	−1	Boban Babunski
(Czech Republic) 2015	Did not qualify								8	1	1	6	4	13	−13	Boban Babunski, Vujadin Stanojković
(Poland) 2017	Group stage	3	0	1	2	4	11	−7	10	6	3	1	13	7	+6	Blagoja Milevski
(Italy) (San Marino) 2019	Did not qualify								10	2	1	7	17	24	−7	Blagoja Milevski, Dobrinko Ilievski
(Hungary) (Slovenia) 2021	Did not qualify								10	5	3	2	20	12	+8	Blagoja Milevski
(Romania) (Georgia (country)) 2023	Did not qualify								10	2	3	5	8	15	−7	Blagoja Milevski, Dragi Kanatlarovski
(Slovakia) 2025	Did not qualify								10	4	0	6	8	15	−7	Dragi Kanatlarovski
(Albania) (Serbia) 2027	Did not qualify								10	2	1	7	8	20	−12	Goran Stanikj
Total	1/17	3	0	1	2	4	11	−7	152	38	27	87	152	280	−128	

== 2017 UEFA European Under-21 Championship ==
=== Qualification ===
Pos	Team	Pld	W	D	L	GF	GA	GD	Pts	Qualification	North Macedonia	France	Iceland	Ukraine	Scotland	
1	Macedonia	10	6	3	1	13	7	+6	21	Final tournament	—	2–2	0–0	1–0	2–0	2–0
2	France	10	6	2	2	17	8	+9	20		1–1	—	2–0	2–0	2–0	1–0
3	Iceland	10	5	3	2	13	9	+4	18		3–0	3–2	—	2–4	2–0	1–1
4	Ukraine	10	4	2	4	14	12	+2	14		0–2	1–0	0–1	—	4–0	1–1
5	Scotland	10	2	2	6	8	17	−9	8		0–1	1–2	0–0	2–2	—	3–1
6	Northern Ireland	10	0	2	8	6	18	−12	2		1–2	0–3	0–1	1–2	1–2	—

Source: UEFA
Rules for classification: Qualification tiebreakers

=== Final tournament ===
==== Group stage ====
Pos	Team	Pld	W	D	L	GF	GA	GD	Pts	Qualification
1	Spain	3	3	0	0	9	1	+8	9	Knockout stage
2	Portugal	3	2	0	1	7	5	+2	6	
3	Serbia	3	0	1	2	2	5	−3	1	
4	Macedonia	3	0	1	2	4	11	−7	1	

Source: UEFA
Rules for classification: Group stage tiebreakers

== 2021 UEFA European Under-21 Championship ==
=== Qualification ===
Pos	Team	Pld	W	D	L	GF	GA	GD	Pts	Qualification	Spain	North Macedonia	Israel	Kazakhstan	Faroe Islands	Montenegro
1	Spain	10	9	1	0	20	1	+19	28	Final tournament	—	3–0	3–0	3–0	2–0	2–0
2	North Macedonia	10	5	3	2	20	12	+8	18		0–1	—	1–1	1–1	7–1	2–1
3	Israel	10	3	4	3	12	14	−2	13		1–1	1–1	—	1–2	3–1	0–0
4	Kazakhstan	10	3	1	6	12	21	−9	10		0–1	1–4	1–2	—	2–3	0–4
5	Faroe Islands	10	3	0	7	11	25	−14	9		0–2	1–2	3–1	1–3	—	1–0
6	Montenegro	10	2	1	7	11	13	−2	7		0–2	1–2	1–2	1–2	3–0	—

Source: UEFA

== 2023 UEFA European Under-21 Championship ==
=== Qualification ===
Pos	Team	Pld	W	D	L	GF	GA	GD	Pts	Qualification	France	Ukraine	Serbia	Faroe Islands	North Macedonia	Armenia
1	France	10	8	2	0	31	5	+26	26	Final tournament	—	5–0	2–0	2–0	3–0	7–0
2	Ukraine	10	7	2	1	20	11	+9	23	Play-offs	3–3	—	2–1	1–0	4–0	2–1
3	Serbia	10	3	3	4	10	11	−1	12		0–3	0–1	—	0–0	2–1	2–0
4	Faroe Islands	10	2	4	4	6	12	−6	10		1–1	0–4	1–1	—	1–1	2–0
5	North Macedonia	10	2	3	5	8	15	−7	9		0–1	1–1	0–0	0–1	—	3–1
6	Armenia	10	1	0	9	7	28	−21	3		1–4	0–2	1–4	2–0	1–2	—

Source: UEFA

== 2025 UEFA European Under-21 Championship ==
=== Qualification ===
Pos	Team	Pld	W	D	L	GF	GA	GD	Pts	Qualification	Netherlands	Georgia	Sweden	North Macedonia	Moldova	Gibraltar
1	Netherlands	10	10	0	0	32	3	+29	30	Final tournament	—	3–1	3–0	5–0	3–0	1–0
2	Georgia	10	6	1	3	14	10	+4	19	Play-offs	0–3	—	0–0	2–1	3–0	2–0
3	Sweden	10	5	2	3	25	10	+15	17		2–4	3–2	—	0–1	4–0	9–0
4	North Macedonia	10	4	0	6	8	15	−7	12		0–2	0–1	0–2	—	2–1	1–0
5	Moldova	10	2	1	7	7	20	−13	7		0–3	0–1	0–0	2–1	—	1–2
6	Gibraltar	10	1	0	9	3	31	−28	3		0–5	0–2	0–5	0–2	1–3	—

Source: UEFA

== 2027 UEFA European Under-21 Championship ==
Pos	Team	Pld	W	D	L	GF	GA	GD	Pts	Qualification	Italy	Poland	Sweden	Montenegro	North Macedonia	Armenia
1	Italy	10	9	0	1	32	7	+25	27 (Note: Tied on head-to-head points (3). Head-to-head goal difference: Italy +3, Poland −3.)	Final tournament	—	6–2	4–0	2–1	4–0	5–1
2	Poland	10	9	0	1	28	8	+20	27	Final tournament	2–1	—	3–0	2–0	3–0	4–1
3	Sweden	10	4	1	5	12	22	−10	13		0–4	0–6	—	2–2	2–0	3–0
4	Montenegro	10	3	3	4	13	16	−3	12		1–4	0–1	2–0	—	3–2	1–1
5	North Macedonia	10	2	1	7	8	20	−12	7		0–1	0–1	1–4	1–1	—	2–1
6	Armenia	10	0	1	9	5	25	−20	1		0–1	0–4	0–1	1–2	0–2	—

Source: UEFA

== Squad ==
=== Current squad ===
Squad named for the friendly match against Serbia on 12 November 2026.
Caps and goals as of 13 November 2026, after the match against Serbia.

No.	Pos.	Player	Date of birth (age)	Caps	Goals	Club
1	GK	Ljupche Djekov	18 October 2005 (age 21)	12	0	(Football Federation of Macedonia) Sileks
12	GK	Nataniel Dimovski	7 March 2006 (age 20)	2	0	(Football Federation of Macedonia) Pelister
22	GK	Daniel Dikovski	26 August 2006 (age 20)	0	0	(Football Federation of Macedonia) Vardar
5	DF	Gjorge Djekov	18 October 2005 (age 21)	21	0	(Football Federation of Macedonia) Sileks
3	DF	Andrej Velkov	7 February 2006 (age 20)	5	0	(Football Federation of Macedonia) Bregalnica
15	DF	Luka Atanasovski	24 April 2007 (age 19)	3	0	(Football Federation of Macedonia) Teteks
2	DF	Zlatko Radeski	17 June 2007 (age 19)	2	0	(Football Federation of Macedonia) Teteks
13	DF	Davor Rosikj	6 February 2007 (age 19)	1	0	(Football Federation of Macedonia) Ohrid Lychnidos
16	DF	Gjorge Tanchev	10 June 2007 (age 19)	1	0	(Football Federation of Macedonia) AP Brera
7	MF	Dimitar Danev	23 May 2006 (age 20)	18	0	(Football Federation of Macedonia) Vardar
10	MF	Martin Gjorgievski	28 February 2005 (age 21)	15	1	(Slovak Football Association) Dukla
8	MF	Teodor Nikolovski	19 January 2005 (age 21)	12	0	(Football Federation of Macedonia) Tikvesh
20	MF	Nikola Manojlov	1 February 2006 (age 20)	9	0	(Football Federation of Macedonia) Sileks
14	MF	Andrej Arizankoski	8 May 2005 (age 21)	7	0	(Football Federation of Macedonia) Shkëndija 77
6	MF	Ilija Maslarov	2 January 2007 (age 19)	6	0	(Swiss Football Association) Rapperswil-Jona
4	MF	Adis Murati	10 May 2006 (age 20)	5	0	(Football Federation of Macedonia) Bashkimi
18	MF	Luka Trpevski	22 January 2010 (age 16)	3	0	(Football Association of Serbia) Crvena Zvezda U17
17	MF	Gorjan Cvetkov	28 April 2005 (age 21)	1	0	(Football Federation of Macedonia) Skopje
23	MF	Darijan Tasev	25 August 2006 (age 20)	1	0	(Football Federation of Macedonia) Bregalnica
11	FW	Dimitar Trajkov	8 August 2004 (age 22)	17	3	(Albanian Football Federation) Vora
9	FW	Nikola Velichkovski	13 September 2005 (age 21)	6	1	(Albanian Football Federation) Skënderbeu
21	FW	Ariton Mehmed	18 November 2007 (age 18)	3	0	(Football Federation of Macedonia) Shkëndija 77
19	FW	David Mateski	15 August 2006 (age 20)	1	0	(Football Federation of Macedonia) Ohrid Lychnidos

=== Recent call-ups ===
Players that have been called up within the past 12 months and are eligible for the 2027 European U21 Football Championship Qualifiers.

Pos.	Player	Date of birth (age)	Caps	Goals	Club	Latest call-up
GK	Slave Vrgov	18 January 2006 (age 20)	1	0	(North Macedonia) AP Brera	v. Sweden, 5 October 2026
DF	Filip Cvetkovski ^{U19}	4 August 2009 (age 17)	2	0	(North Macedonia) Vardar	v. Sweden, 5 October 2026
DF	Mario Mitrev	14 February 2007 (age 19)	1	0	(North Macedonia) AP Brera	v. Sweden, 5 October 2026
DF	David Stojanoski	20 March 2007 (age 19)	1	0	(Slovenia) Krka	v. Bulgaria, 30 June 2026
DF	Anes Meliqi ^{A}	9 January 2006 (age 20)	15	1	(North Macedonia) Shkëndija	v. Armenia, 31 June 2026
DF	Numan Ajetovikj ^{NA}	18 March 2006 (age 20)	4	0	(Albania) Egnatia	v. Armenia, 31 June 2026
MF	Vasil Tashovski	11 March 2007 (age 19)	3	2	(Serbia) Mladost	v. Serbia, 12 November 2026 ^{WD}
MF	Martin Djangarovski	11 June 2009 (age 17)	1	0	(Serbia) Radnik	v. Sweden, 5 October 2026
MF	Muhamed Kurtishi ^{U19}	24 August 2008 (age 18)	1	0	(Switzerland) Rapperswil-Jona	v. Sweden, 5 October 2026 ^{WD}
MF	Marko Nikolovski	10 February 2006 (age 20)	1	0	(North Macedonia) Ohrid Lychnidos	v. Sweden, 5 October 2026
MF	Emir Shabotikj	3 October 2007 (age 19)	1	0	(North Macedonia) Detonit Plachkovica	v. Sweden, 5 October 2026
MF	Matej Gashtarov ^{A}	15 November 2006 (age 20)	11	0	(Serbia) Crvena Zvezda	v. Bulgaria, 30 June 2026
MF	Muhamed Elmas	31 January 2006 (age 20)	4	0	(North Macedonia) Makedonija GP	v. Bulgaria, 30 June 2026
MF	Harun Nezirovski	25 February 2007 (age 19)	1	0	(Sweden) Helsingborg U19	v. Bulgaria, 30 June 2026
MF	Sejdo Durakov	7 January 2007 (age 19)	2	0	(Germany) Ingolstadt 04	v. Armenia, 31 May 2026
FW	Admir Latifi	29 June 2007 (age 19)	5	2	(Croatia) Osijek	v. Serbia, 12 November 2026 ^{WD}
FW	Igor Ristov	7 October 2007 (age 19)	0	0	(North Macedonia) AP Brera	v. Serbia, 12 November 2026 ^{WD}
FW	Ditmir Hoxha ^{U19}	8 August 2008 (age 18)	3	0	(England) Leeds United U21	v. Sweden, 5 October 2026
FW	Salim Arifi	19 September 2006 (age 20)	1	0	(Kosovo) Mitrovica	v. Sweden, 5 October 2026
FW	Fadil Islamovikj	7 January 2009 (age 17)	1	0	(Croatia) Kustošija U19	v. Sweden, 5 October 2026
FW	Ivan Shirikj	29 March 2007 (age 19)	1	0	(North Macedonia) AP Brera	v. Sweden, 5 October 2026

- A: Called up by the Macedonia A National Team
- U19: Called up by the Macedonia U19 National Team
- INJ: Injured
- WD: Withdrew
- NA: Not available

=== Current First Squad ===

Current First Squad (2006+) with the Club Leagues they play in

=== Past squads ===
- 2017 UEFA European Under-21 Football Championship squad

== Statistics ==
As of 6 October 2026.

=== Most appearances ===
Rank	Name	U21 Career	Caps
1	Mario Ilievski	2020–2024	33
2	Dimitar Todorovski	2021–2024	32
3	Goran Bogdanovikj	2009–2012	28
3	Metodi Maksimov	2021–2024	28
5	David Babunski	2012–2017	27
5	Davor Zdravkovski	2015–2020	27
7	Matej Angelov	2023–2026	26
8	Luka Stankovski	2021–2024	25
9	Stefan Despotovski	2022–2024	24
9	Boban Nikolov	2013–2017	24
9	Reshat Ramadani	2021–2024	24
9	Gjoko Zajkov	2013–2017	24

=== Top goalscorers ===
Rank	Name	U21 Career	Goals	Caps	Ratio
1	Dimitar Mitrovski	2018–2020	7	18	0.39
1	Samir Fazli	2008–2012	7	22	0.32
1	Mario Ilievski	2020–2024	7	33	0.21
4	Kire Markoski	2013–2017	6	16	0.38
4	Luan Abazi	2021–2024	6	18	0.33
4	Jani Atanasov	2018–2020	6	18	0.33
7	Darko Churlinov	2018–2021	5	16	0.31
7	Ilija Nestorovski	2009–2012	5	19	0.26
7	David Babunski	2012–2017	5	27	0.19
10	Miroslav Gjokikj	1994–1995	4	5+	0.8
10	Artim Shaqiri	1994–1995	4	9+	0.44
10	Muarem Muarem	2009–2010	4	11	0.36
10	Aco Stojkov	2002–2005	4	13	0.31
10	Enis Bardhi	2014–2017	4	14	0.29
10	Berat Kalkan	2021–2024	4	17	0.24
10	Tihomir Kostadinov	2015–2018	4	18	0.22
10	Marjan Radeski	2013–2017	4	21	0.19
10	Metodi Maksimov	2021–2024	4	28	0.14

== See also ==
- North Macedonia national football team
- North Macedonia national under-19 football team
- North Macedonia national under-17 football team
- UEFA European Under-21 Championship
