= Tobias Hedl =

Austrian footballer (born 2003

Personal information
- Date of birth: 15 January 2003 (age 23)
- Place of birth: Vienna, Austria
- Height: 1.85 m (6 ft 1 in)
- Position: Forward

Team information
- Current team: SV Zulte Waregem
- Number: 20

Youth career
- –2022: SK Rapid Wien

Senior career*
Years	Team	Apps	(Gls)
2022–2025	SK Rapid Wien II	87	(35)
2024–2025	SK Rapid Wien	2	(0)
2025	→ SV Zulte Waregem (loan)	10	(4)
2025–	SV Zulte Waregem	11	(1)

International career^{‡}
2017–2018	Austria U15	2	(4)
2024	Austria U21	2	(1)
- * Club domestic league appearances and goals as of 11 May 2026 ‡ National team caps and goals as of 15 October 2024

Tobias Hedl (born 15 January 2003) is an Austrian professional footballer who plays as a forward for SV Zulte Waregem.

== Early life ==
Hedl was born on 15 January 2003 in Vienna, Austria and is the younger brother of Austria international Niklas Hedl. Growing up, he studied computer science.

== Club career ==
As a youth player, Hedl joined the youth academy of Austrian side SK Rapid Wien and was promoted to the club's reserve team in 2022, where he made eighty-five league appearances and scored thirty-five goals and helped them achieve promotion from the third tier to the second tier. Ahead of the 2024–25 season, he was promoted to their senior team, where he made two league appearances and scored zero goals.

In 2025, he signed for Belgian side SV Zulte Waregem, helping the club achieve promotion from the second tier to the top flight. On 19 January 2025, he debuted for them during a 1–1 away draw with RFC Liège in the league.

== International career ==
Hedl is an Austria youth international. During October 2024, he played for the Austria national under-21 football team for 2025 UEFA European Under-21 Championship qualification.
