= 2024–25 SK Rapid Wien season =

Sportklub Rapid
2024–25 season
- Chairman: Alexander Wrabetz
- Head coach: Stefan Kulovits (interim); Robert Klauß (until 24 April)
- Stadium: Allianz Stadion
- Bundesliga: Winner (Conference League play-offs); 5th (Championship round); 5th (Regular season)
- Austrian Cup: Round of 16
- UEFA Europa League: Play-off round
- UEFA Conference League: Quarter-finals
- Top goalscorer: League: Dion Drena Beljo (10 goals); All: Dion Drena Beljo (19 goals)
- Highest home attendance: 26,000 vs. Austria Wien, 22nd September 2024; 26,000 vs. Sturm Graz, 18th May 2025
- Lowest home attendance: 11,680 vs. RB Salzburg, 30th March 2023 (Note: reduced capacity due to supporter riots in a previous game)
- Average home league attendance: 19,500
Home colours	Away colours
- All statistics correct as of 1 June 2025.

The 2024–25 season was the 127th season in the existence of the Sportklub Rapid and the club's 76th consecutive season in the top flight of Austrian football. In addition to the domestic league, Rapid participated in this season's edition of the Austrian Cup and entered international football in the second qualifying round to the UEFA Europa League after coming 4th in the previous Bundesliga season.

== Squad ==
=== Squad statistics ===
No.	Nat.	Name	Age	League		Austrian Cup		UEFA Competitions		Total		Discipline		
No.	Nat.	Name	Age	Apps	Goals	Apps	Goals	Apps	Goals	Apps	Goals	Yellow card	(yellow card) (red card)	Red card
Goalkeepers
25	(Austria)	Paul Gartler	27	2+1						2+1				
45	(Austria)	Niklas Hedl	23	32		3		16		51		2		1
Defenders
3	(Austria)	Benjamin Böckle	22	5+2		3		0+3		8+5		2		
4	(Austria)	Jakob Schöller	18	4+5		1		0+3		5+8		1		
6	(France)	Serge-Philippe Raux-Yao	25	31	1	2		16	1	49	2	2		1
20	(Ivory Coast)	Ange Ahoussou	20	8+3						8+3		2		
20	(Austria)	Maximilian Hofmann	30	3+5		3	1	2+3		8+8	1	2		
23	(Austria)	Jonas Auer	23	22+3	2	0+1		14		36+4	2	5		
47	(Tunisia)	Amìn-Elias Gröller	19	1		0+1		0+1		1+2				
53	(Austria)	Dominic Vincze	20	6		1		0+2		7+2		4		
55	(Serbia)	Nenad Cvetković	28	20+2	2			14+1	1	34+3	3	7		1
77	(Hungary)	Bendegúz Bolla	24	32	2	0+1		13	1	45+1	3	11		1
Midfielders
5	(Austria)	Roman Kerschbaum	30	0+3		1+2		0+1		1+6				
8	(Austria)	Lukas Grgić	28	26+1		1		15	1	42+1	1	7		1
10	(Austria)	Christoph Lang	22	3+5		2+1		1+3	2	6+9	2			
16	(Norway)	Tobias Børkeeiet	25	1+6		1		0+4		2+10		1		
17	(Mali)	Mamadou Sangaré	22	24+3	2	2	1	15		41+3	3	16		2
18	(Austria)	Matthias Seidl	23	32+2	4	1+2		13+3	2	46+7	6	2		
21	(Austria)	Louis Schaub	29	21+10	2	2		9+4	3	32+14	5	3		
24	(Turkey)	Dennis Kaygin	20	3+6		2+1	1	0+6		5+13	1	2		
28	(Austria)	Moritz Oswald	22	11+11	1	2		6+5		19+16	1			
29	(Ivory Coast)	Romeo Amane	21	7+4	1			1+1		8+5	1			
Forwards
7	(Croatia)	Dion Drena Beljo	22	27+3	10	2+1	3	15+1	6	44+5	19	10		
9	(Austria)	Guido Burgstaller	35	16+6	6			10+3	6	26+9	12	9		1
19	(Barbados)	Thierry Gale	22	0+1				0+1		0+2				
22	(Sweden)	Isak Jansson	22	17+5	7			9+2	2	26+7	9	5		
27	(Austria)	Noah Bischof	21	2+12	1	2		0+12		4+24	1	3		
48	(Austria)	Nikolaus Wurmbrand	18	8+9	1	2		4+5	2	14+14	3	1		
49	(Austria)	Tobias Hedl	21	0+2				0+1		0+3				
49	(Montenegro)	Andrija Radulović	21	5+10	3			1+2		6+12	3	1		
66	(Austria)	Furkan Dursun	19	1+2		0+2		0+5		1+9				
70	(France)	Ismaïl Seydi	22	0+2						0+2				
99	(Austria)	Ercan Kara	28	4+13	2			2+1		6+14	2	3		

=== Goal scorers ===
Name	Bundesliga	Cup	International	Total
(Croatia) Dion Drena Beljo	10	3	6	19
(Austria) Guido Burgstaller	6		6	12
(Sweden) Isak Jansson	7		2	9
(Austria) Matthias Seidl	4		2	6
(Austria) Louis Schaub	2		3	5
(Hungary) Bendegúz Bolla	2		1	3
(Serbia) Nenad Cvetković	2		1	3
(Montenegro) Andrija Radulović	3			3
(Mali) Mamadou Sangare	2	1		3
(Austria) Nikolaus Wurmbrand	1		2	3
(Austria) Jonas Auer	2			2
(Austria) Ercan Kara	2			2
(Austria) Christoph Lang			2	2
(France) Serge-Philippe Raux-Yao	1		1	2
(Ivory Coast) Romeo Amane	1			1
(Austria) Noah Bischof	1			1
(Austria) Lukas Grgić			1	1
(Austria) Maximilian Hofmann		1		1
(Turkey) Dennis Kaygin		1		1
(Austria) Moritz Oswald	1			1
Own goals
(Germany) Bright Arrey-Mbi (Braga)			1	1
(Sweden) Hampus Finndell (Djurgården)			1	1
(Sweden) Jacob Une (Djurgården)			1	1
Totals	47	6	30	83

=== Disciplinary record ===
Name	Bundesliga			Cup			International			Total		
Name	Yellow card	(yellow card) (red card)	Red card	Yellow card	(yellow card) (red card)	Red card	Yellow card	(yellow card) (red card)	Red card	Yellow card	(yellow card) (red card)	Red card
(Mali) Mamadou Sangare	9		1	2			5		1	16		2
(Hungary) Bendegúz Bolla	7						4		1	11		1
(Austria) Guido Burgstaller	6		1				3			9		1
(Croatia) Dion Drena Beljo	9						1			10		
(Serbia) Nenad Cvetković	5		1				2			7		1
(Austria) Lukas Grgić	4						3		1	7		1
(Austria) Jonas Auer	4						1			5		
(Sweden) Isak Jansson	1						4			5		
(Austria) Dominic Vincze	3			1						4		
(Austria) Niklas Hedl	1		1				1			2		1
(France) Serge-Philippe Raux-Yao	1						1		1	2		1
(Austria) Noah Bischof	3									3		
(Austria) Ercan Kara	3									3		
(Austria) Louis Schaub	1						2			3		
(Ivory Coast) Ange Ahoussou	2									2		
(Austria) Benjamin Böckle	2									2		
(Austria) Maximilian Hofmann	1			1						2		
(Turkey) Dennis Kaygin	2									2		
(Austria) Matthias Seidl							2			2		
(Norway) Tobias Børkeeiet	1									1		
(Montenegro) Andrija Radulović							1			1		
(Austria) Jakob Schöller	1									1		
(Austria) Nikolaus Wurmbrand	1									1		
Totals	67		4	4			30		4	101		8

=== Transfers ===
==== In ====
Pos.	Nat.	Name	Age	Moved from	Type	Transfer Window	Ref.
MF	(Austria)	Louis Schaub	29	(Germany) Hannover 96	Transfer	Summer	
DF	(Austria)	Jakob Schöller	18	(Austria) Admira Wacker	Transfer	Summer	
DF	(Austria)	Benjamin Böckle	22	(Germany) Fortuna Düsseldorf	Transfer	Summer	
MF	(Mali)	Mamadou Sangare	22	(Austria) FC Red Bull Salzburg	Transfer	Summer	
MF	(Norway)	Tobias Børkeeiet	25	(Norway) Rosenborg BK	Transfer	Summer	
DF	(France)	Serge-Philippe Raux-Yao	25	(France) Rodez AF	Free transfer	Summer	
DF	(Hungary)	Bendegúz Bolla	24	(England) Wolverhampton Wanderers	Free transfer	Summer	
FW	(Croatia)	Dion Drena Beljo	22	(Germany) FC Augsburg	Loan	Summer	
FW	(Morocco)	Ryan Mmaee	26	(England) Stoke City F.C.	Loan	Summer	
FW	(Austria)	Noah Bischof	21	(Austria) First Vienna FC	Loan return	Summer	
FW	(Austria)	Bernhard Zimmermann	22	(Austria) Wolfsberger AC	Loan return	Summer	
FW	(Netherlands)	Ferdy Druijf	26	(Netherlands) PEC Zwolle	Loan return	Summer	
MF	(Ivory Coast)	Amane Romeo	21	(Sweden) BK Häcken	Transfer	Winter	
DF	(Ivory Coast)	Ange Ahoussou	21	(France) Pau FC	Transfer	Winter	
FW	(Austria)	Ercan Kara	29	(Turkey) Samsunspor	Loan	Winter	
FW	(Montenegro)	Andrija Radulović	22	(Serbia) FK Vojvodina	Loan	Winter	

==== Out ====
Pos.	Nat.	Name	Age	Moved to	Type	Transfer Window	Ref.
DF	(Austria)	Leopold Querfeld	20	(Germany) 1. FC Union Berlin	Transfer	Summer	
FW	(France)	Fally Mayulu	21	(England) Bristol City F.C.	Transfer	Summer	
MF	(Austria)	Nikolas Sattlberger	20	(Belgium) K.R.C. Genk	Transfer	Summer	
DF	(Austria)	Martin Moormann	23	(Austria) FC Blau-Weiß Linz	Free transfer	Summer	
MF	(Austria)	Marco Grüll	26	(Germany) SV Werder Bremen	Free transfer	Summer	
GK	(Austria)	Bernhard Unger	25	(Austria) First Vienna FC	Free transfer	Summer	
DF	(Austria)	Thorsten Schick	34	(Austria) DSV Leoben	Free transfer	Summer	
DF	(Austria)	Michael Sollbauer	34	(Austria) SV Ried	Free transfer	Summer	
MF	(Austria)	Oliver Strunz	24	(Austria) SC Rheindorf Altach	Loan	Summer	
DF	(Netherlands)	Neraysho Kasanwirjo	22	(Netherlands) Feyenoord Rotterdam	Loan return	Summer	
DF	(Netherlands)	Terence Kongolo	30	(England) Fulham F.C.	Loan return	Summer	
MF	(Austria)	Christoph Lang	23	(Austria) LASK	Transfer	Winter	
DF	(Austria)	Maximilian Hofmann	31	(Hungary) Debreceni VSC	Free transfer	Winter	
FW	(Austria)	Bernhard Zimmermann	22	(Austria) First Vienna FC	Free transfer	Winter	
FW	(Austria)	Tobias Hedl	21	(Belgium) Zulte Waregem	Loan	Winter	
MF	(Turkey)	Dennis Kaygin	20	(Netherlands) Willem II Tilburg	Loan	Winter	
FW	(Barbados)	Thierry Gale	22	(Poland) Piast Gliwice	Loan	Winter	
FW	(Morocco)	Ryan Mmaee	27	(England) Stoke City F.C.	Loan return	Winter	
FW	(Netherlands)	Ferdy Druijf	26	Free agency	Contract termination	Winter	

== Pre-season and friendlies ==
Win Draw Loss Fixtures

28 June 2024 Friendly	SC Herzogenburg	0–11	Rapid	Herzogenburg, Austria
			8' (o.g.); 10' Bischof; 14' Lang; 40' Zivkovic; 53' Hofmann; 55' 64' Dursun; 58' 61' T. Hedl; 70' Guèye; 90' Bajlicz	Stadium: Fenster Kaiser Stadion; Attendance: 1,500

6 July 2024 Friendly	Slavia Praha	3–0	Rapid	Bad Leonfelden, Austria
	Fila 16'; Vorlický 56'; Diouf (yellow card) (red card) 62'; Chaloupek 87'	Report

13 July 2024 Friendly	Debreceni VSC	2–3 (Note: playing time 60+45 minutes)	Rapid	Hausmening , Austria
	Romanchuk 20'; Dzsudzsák 60+3'	Report	7' Beljo; 70' Bischof; 102' Dursun

20 July 2024 Friendly	Rapid	3–1	Admira Wacker	Vienna, Austria
	Bischof 19' 47'; Vincze 24'	Report	53' Gallé	Stadium: Training ground Attendance: –

20 July 2024 Friendly	Rapid	1–1	AC Milan	Vienna, Austria
	Demir 88'	Report	64' Florenzi	Stadium: Allianz Stadion; Attendance: 24,500

10 October 2024 Friendly	Rapid	2–0	SV Horn	Vienna, Austria
	Gale 1'; Djezic 51'	Report		Stadium: Training ground Attendance: –

15 November 2024 Friendly	Rapid	1–2	Floridsdorfer AC	Vienna, Austria
	Bischof 10'	Report	55' Maier; 73' Bitsche	Stadium: Training ground Attendance: –

18 January 2025 Friendly	Rapid	1–0	SKN St. Pölten	Vienna, Austria
	Seidl 65'	Report		Stadium: Training ground Attendance: –

25 January 2025 Friendly	Rapid	4–2 (Note: playing time 2x 60 minutes)	FCI Levadia	Benidorm, Spain
	Beljo 22' 35'; Wurmbrand 83'; Oswald 101'	Report	56' Musaba; 115' Tammik	Stadium: Training ground

1 February 2025 Friendly	Rapid	3–1	SKU Amstetten	Vienna, Austria
	Kerschbaum 27'; Dursun 55'; Nunoo 66'	Report	87' Offenthaler	Stadium: Training ground Attendance: –

1 February 2025 Friendly	Rapid	1–0	BW Linz	Vienna, Austria
	Seidl 15'	Report		Stadium: Training ground Attendance: –

== Competitions ==
=== Overall record ===
Competition	First match	Last match	Starting round	Final position	Record							
Competition	First match	Last match	Starting round	Final position	Pld	W	D	L	GF	GA	GD	Win %
Austrian Football Bundesliga	4 August 2024	1 June 2025		5th	34	13	8	13	47	45	+2	38.24
Austrian Cup	28 July 2024	30 October 2024	Round 1	Round of 16	3	2		1	6	3	+3	66.67
Europa League	25 July 2024	29 August 2024	Second qualifying round	Play-off round	6	4	1	1	14	6	+8	66.67
Conference League	2 October 2024	17 April 2025	League phase	Quarterfinals	10	6	2	2	16	11	+5	60.00
Total					53	25	11	17	83	65	+18	47.17

Source: Soccerway

=== Austrian Football Bundesliga ===
==== Results summary ====
Overall								Home						Away					
Pld	W	D	L	GF	GA	GD	Pts	W	D	L	GF	GA	GD	W	D	L	GF	GA	GD
32	13	8	11	47	45	+2	47	11	2	4	30	13	+17	2	6	7	17	32	−15

Source: Austrian Football Bundesliga

==== Results by round ====
Round	1	2	3	4	5	6	7	8	9	10	11	12	13	14	15	16	17	18	19	20	21	22	23	24	25	26	27	28	29	30	31	32
Ground	H	A	H	A	H	A	H	H	A	H	A	A	H	A	H	A	H	A	A	H	A	H	H	A	H	A	A	H	H	A	H	A
Result	W	D	W	L	W	D	W	D	W	W	D	D	W	D	L	D	L	L	L	W	L	W	L	L	W	L	L	D	L	W	W	L
Position	5	3	2	5	3	3	2	3	3	3	3	3	2	2	3	3	4	4	5	5	6	5	5	5	5	5	5	5	5	5	5	5

Source: Austrian Football Bundesliga
A = Away; H = Home; W = Win; D = Draw; L = Loss

==== Regular season ====
===== Table =====
Pos	Team	Pld	W	D	L	GF	GA	GD	Pts	Qualification
3	Red Bull Salzburg	22	10	8	4	33	22	+11	38	Qualification for the Championship round
4	Wolfsberg	22	11	3	8	44	30	+14	36	Qualification for the Championship round
5	Rapid Wien	22	9	7	6	32	24	+8	34	Qualification for the Championship round
6	Blau-Weiß Linz	22	10	3	9	30	29	+1	33	Qualification for the Championship round
7	LASK	22	9	4	9	32	33	−1	31	Qualification for the Relegation round

Source: Austrian Football Bundesliga
Rules for classification: 1) Points; 2) Head-to-head record; 3) Goal difference; 4) Goals scored; 5) Matches won; 6) Away matches won; 7) Away goals scored.

===== Matches =====
4 August 2024 1	Rapid	1–0	Sturm	Vienna
17:00	Beljo 30'	Report		Stadium: Allianz Stadion; Attendance: 24,300; Referee: Christopher Jäger

11 August 2024 2	Austria Klagenfurt	1–1	Rapid	Klagenfurt
17:00	Bobzien 4'; Mahrer (red card) 47'	Report	18' Oswald	Stadium: Wörthersee Stadion; Attendance: 5,919; Referee: Arnes Talic

18 August 2024 3	Rapid	2–0	Wattens	Vienna
17:00	Beljo 42'; Raux-Yao 67'	Report		Stadium: Allianz Stadion; Attendance: 15,200; Referee: Markus Hameter

25 August 2024 4	BW Linz	3–0	Rapid	Linz
17:00	Ronivaldo 18' 60'; Pirkl 29'	Report		Stadium: Donauparkstadion; Attendance: 5,600; Referee: Alexander Harkam

1 September 2024 5	Rapid	3–2	RB Salzburg	Vienna
17:00	Jansson 19' 60'; Auer 37'	Report	5' Nene; 45+3' Ratkov	Stadium: Allianz Stadion; Attendance: 21,500; Referee: Stefan Ebner

14 September 2024 6	Wolfsberg	1–1	Rapid	Wolfsberg
17:00	Zukić 51'	Report	30' Wurmbrand	Stadium: Lavanttal-Arena; Attendance: 3,400; Referee: Sebastian Gishamer

22 September 2024 7	Rapid	2–1	Austria Wien	Vienna
17:00	Beljo 23'; Seidl 60'	Report	45' Gruber	Stadium: Allianz Stadion; Attendance: 26,000; Referee: Christian-Petru Ciochirca

28 September 2024 8	Rapid	1–1	LASK	Vienna
17:00	Burgstaller 27'	Report	46' Žulj	Stadium: Allianz Stadion; Attendance: 21,300; Referee: Christopher Jäger

6 October 2024 9	Altach	0–1	Rapid	Altach
14:30		Report	36' Beljo	Stadium: Stadion Schnabelholz; Attendance: 6,100; Referee: Stefan Ebner

20 October 2024 10	Rapid	2–1	Hartberg	Vienna
17:00	Beljo 15'; Bischof 85'	Report	21'Kainz	Stadium: Allianz Stadion; Attendance: 19,200; Referee: Christopher Jäger

27 October 2024 11	GAK	1–1	Rapid	Graz
14:30	Lichtenberger 69'	Report	90+2' (pen.) Beljo	Stadium: Liebenauer Stadium; Attendance: 9,069; Referee: Daniel Pfister

2 November 2024 12	Sturm	1–1	Rapid	Graz
17:00	Yardımcı 82'	Report	90' (pen.) Beljo	Stadium: Liebenauer Stadium; Attendance: 16,400; Referee: Walter Altmann

10 November 2024 13	Rapid	2–0	Austria Klagenfurt	Vienna
17:00	Burgstaller 11'; Schaub 23'	Report		Stadium: Allianz Stadion; Attendance: 15.700; Referee: Stefan Ebner

23 November 2024 14	Wattens	0–0	Rapid	Innsbruck
17:00		Report		Stadium: Tivoli Stadion Tirol; Attendance: 2,450; Referee: Christian-Petru Ciochirca

1 December 2024 15	Rapid	0–1	BW Linz	Vienna
14:00		Report	60' Ronivaldo	Stadium: Allianz Stadion; Attendance: 16,300; Referee: Arnes Talic

7 December 2024 16	RB Salzburg	2–2	Rapid	Wals-Siezenheim
17:00	Gloukh (penalty missed); Capaldo 34'; Nene 56'	Report	Auer 48'; Jansson 74'	Stadium: Red Bull Arena; Referee: Stefan Ebner

8 February 2025 17	Rapid	1–3	Wolfsberg	Vienna
17:00	Schaub 39'	Report	73' 90+3' Pink; 85' Ballo	Stadium: Allianz Stadion; Attendance: 17,900; Referee: Markus Hameter

16 February 2025 18	Austria Wien	2–1	Rapid	Vienna
17:00	Fitz 41' (pen.) 47'	Report	30' Sangaré	Stadium: Franz Horr Stadium; Attendance: 15,300; Referee: Julian Weinberger

23 February 2025 19	LASK	2–1	Rapid	Linz
17:00	Lang 31'; Bello 79'	Report	90' Radulović	Stadium: Raiffeisen Arena; Attendance: 14,980; Referee: Christian-Petru Ciochirca

1 March 2025 20	Rapid	5–0	Altach	Vienna
17:00	Cvetković 8' (red card) 62'; Jansson 56' 68'; Beljo (penalty missed) 78'; Radulović 90+5'	Report	(yellow card) (red card) 66' Koller	Stadium: Allianz Stadion; Attendance: 17,000; Referee: Jakob Semler

9 March 2025 21	Hartberg	2–1	Rapid	Hartberg
17:00	Havel 49'; Huskovic 74'	Report	84' Jansson	Stadium: Profertil Arena; Referee: Sebastian Gishamer

16 March 2025 22	Rapid	3–0	GAK	Vienna
17:00	Cvetković 23'; Beljo 33' (pen.); Jansson 44'	Report		Stadium: Allianz Stadion; Attendance: 21,500; Referee: Stefan Ebner

==== Championship round ====
===== Table =====
Pos	Team	Pld	W	D	L	GF	GA	GD	Pts	Qualification	STU	RBS	AWI	WAC	RWI	BWL
2	Red Bull Salzburg	32	16	9	7	53	36	+17	38	Qualification for the Champions League second qualifying round	1–2	—	2–0	1–1	4–2	2–1
3	Austria Wien	32	18	6	8	47	32	+15	37	Qualification for the Conference League second qualifying round	2–1	1–3	—	0–0	1–2	2–2
4	Wolfsberg	32	16	7	9	60	38	+22	37	Qualification for the Europa League third qualifying round (Note: Wolfsberg qualified for the Europa League third qualifying round as the 2024–25 Austrian Cup winners.)	1–1	2–1	1–2	—	5–1	2–0
5	Rapid Wien (O)	32	12	8	12	43	42	+1	27	Qualification for the Conference League play-offs	3–1	0–2	2–0	0–1	—	0–0
6	Blau-Weiß Linz	32	11	5	16	37	45	−8	21		0–1	1–2	0–2	1–2	2–1	—

Source: Austrian Football Bundesliga
Legend: Blue = home team win; Yellow = draw; Red = away team win.
Rules for classification: 1) Points; 2) Points with (possible) half points subtracted due to rounding; 3) Head-to-head points; 4) Head-to-head goal difference; 5) Head-to-head goals scored; 6) Goal difference; 7) Goals scored; 8) Matches won; 9) Away matches won; 10) Away goals scored.
(O) Play-off winners

===== Matches =====
30 March 2024 23	Rapid	0–2	RB Salzburg	Vienna
17:00	Grgic (yellow card) (red card) 70' (Note: 2nd yellow card was caused by a miscommunication in the refereeing team and as the player was already substituted off, was annulled by the league)	Report	37' 48' Vertessen	Stadium: Allianz Stadion; Attendance: 11,680 (Note: reduced capacity due to supporter riots in a previous game); Referee: Alexander Harkam

4 April 2025 24	Sturm	2–0	Rapid	Graz
19:30	Bøving 18'; Grgic 90'	Report		Stadium: Merkur Arena; Attendance: 15,746; Referee: Stefan Ebner

13 April 2025 25	Rapid	2–0	Austria Wien	Vienna
17:00	Seidl 5'; Sangaré 70'	Report		Stadium: Allianz Stadion; Attendance: 22,669; Referee: Walter Altmann

20 April 2025 26	Wolfsberg	5–1	Rapid	Wolfsberg
14:30	Zukić 10' 63'; Agyemang 74'; Kojzek 88' 90+3'	Report	24' (pen.) Beljo; (red card) 28' (Note: the decision and failed intervention by VAR was judged a clear officiating error by the league and no further match suspension was given) Hedl	Stadium: Lavanttal-Arena; Attendance: 5,418; Referee: Sebastian Gishamer

23 April 2025 27	BW Linz	2–1	Rapid	Linz
18:30	Ronivaldo 24'; S. Seidl 47'	Report	75' Amane	Stadium: Donauparkstadion; Attendance: 5,595; Referee: Arnes Talic

27 April 2025 28	Rapid	0–0	BW Linz	Vienna
14:30	Burgstaller (red card) 84'	Report		Stadium: Allianz Stadion; Attendance: 19,339; Referee: Markus Hameter

4 May 2025 29	Rapid	0–1	Wolfsberg	Vienna
14:30		Report	Atanga 63'	Stadium: Allianz Stadion; Attendance: 17,990; Referee: Jakob Semler

11 May 2025 30	Austria Wien	1–2	Rapid	Vienna
17:00	Fitz 80' (pen.)	Report	32' Burgstaller; 84' Kara	Stadium: Franz Horr Stadium; Attendance: 14,622; Referee: Christopher Jäger

18 May 2025 31	Rapid	3–1	Sturm	Vienna
17:00	Bolla 21' 78'; Burgstaller 41'	Report	66' Le. Grgic	Stadium: Allianz Stadion; Attendance: 26,000; Referee: Walter Altmann

24 May 2025 32	RB Salzburg	4–2	Rapid	Wals-Siezenheim
17:00	Gloukh 8'; Nene 12' 56'; E. Baidoo 24'	Report	19' Radulović; 64' Burgstaller	Stadium: Red Bull Arena; Attendance: 13,052; Referee: Alexander Harkam

==== Conference League play-offs ====
===== Finals =====
29 May 2025	LASK	3–1	Rapid	Linz
17:00	Žulj 5' 90+2'; Coulibaly 66'	Report	26' (pen.) Seidl	Stadium: Raiffeisen Arena; Attendance: 13,220; Referee: Alexander Harkam

1 June 2025	Rapid	3–0 (4–3 agg.)	LASK	Vienna
17:00	Burgstaller 31'; Seidl 80' (pen.); Kara 90+5'	Report		Stadium: Allianz Stadion; Attendance: 18,150; Referee: Christopher Jäger

=== Austrian Cup ===
28 July 2024 1st round	SC Neusiedl/See	0–2	Rapid	Neusiedl am See
18:30		Report	39' Beljo; 72' Kaygin	Stadium: Sportzentrum Neusiedl; Attendance: 3,000; Referee: Jakob Semler

25 September 2024 2nd round	SR Donaufeld	1–3	Rapid	Vienna
18:00	Holzer 30'	Report	48' 50' Beljo; 54' Sangare	Stadium: Hohe Warte Stadium; Attendance: 4,500; Referee: Achim Untergasser

30 October 2024 Round of 16	SV Stripfing	2–1	Rapid	Vienna
18:15	Pecirep 80'; Radonjic 85'	Report	39' Hofmann	Stadium: Hohe Warte Stadium; Attendance: 2,545; Referee: Alexander Harkam

=== UEFA Europa League ===
==== Second qualifying round ====
25 July 2024 First leg	Wisła Kraków (Poland)	1–2	Rapid	Kraków, Poland
18:00	Carbó 79'	Report	37' Jansson; (red card) 45+6' Bolla; 53' Seidl	Stadium: Henryk Reyman Stadium; Attendance: 30,542; Referee: Mohammad Al-Emara (Finland)

1 August 2024 Second leg	Rapid	6–1 (8–2 agg.)	(Poland) Wisła Kraków	Vienna, Austria
20:30	Burgstaller 6' 30' 35'; Beljo 24'; Sangare (penalty missed); Raux-Yao 45'; Lang 79'	Report	80' Rodado	Stadium: Allianz Stadion; Attendance: 19,600; Referee: Michael Oliver (England)

==== Third qualifying round ====
8 August 2024 First leg	Trabzonspor (Turkey)	0–1	Rapid	Trabzon, Turkey
19:00		Report	67' Grgić	Stadium: Şenol Güneş Sports Complex; Attendance: 33,000; Referee: Kristo Tohver (Estonia)

15 August 2024 Second leg	Rapid	2–0 (3–0 agg.)	(Turkey) Trabzonspor	Vienna, Austria
18:00	Seidl 77'; Lang 87'	Report	(red card) 84' Pedro Malheiro	Stadium: Allianz Stadion; Attendance: 22,500; Referee: Manfredas Lukjančukas (Lithuania)

==== Play-off round ====
22 August 2024 First leg	S.C. Braga (Portugal)	2–1	Rapid	Braga, Portugal
21:30	Vitor Carvalho 33'; Zalazar 71'	Report	(red card) 2' Grgić; 25' Burgstaller	Stadium: Estádio Municipal de Braga; Attendance: 15,868; Referee: Mykola Balakin (Ukraine)

29 August 2024 Second leg	Rapid	2–2 (3–4 agg.)	(Portugal) S.C. Braga	Vienna, Austria
21:00	Arrey-Mbi 9' (o.g.); Jansson 47'	Report	68' (pen.) El Ouazzani; 70' Ricardo Horta	Stadium: Allianz Stadion; Attendance: 21,400; Referee: Anthony Taylor (England)

=== UEFA Conference League ===
==== League phase ====
Pos	Team	Pld	W	D	L	GF	GA	GD	Pts	Qualification
2	(Portuguese Football Federation) Vitória de Guimarães	6	4	2	0	13	6	+7	14	Advance to round of 16 (seeded)
3	(Italian Football Federation) Fiorentina	6	4	1	1	18	7	+11	13	Advance to round of 16 (seeded)
4	(Austrian Football Association) Rapid Wien	6	4	1	1	11	5	+6	13	Advance to round of 16 (seeded)
5	(Swedish Football Association) Djurgårdens IF	6	4	1	1	11	7	+4	13 (Note: Away goals scored: Djurgårdens IF 5, Lugano 4.)	Advance to round of 16 (seeded)
6	(Swiss Football Association) Lugano	6	4	1	1	11	7	+4	13	Advance to round of 16 (seeded)

Source: UEFA
Rules for classification: League phase tiebreakers
Notes:

2 October 2024 1	İstanbul Başakşehir (Turkey)	1–2	Rapid	Istanbul, Turkey
16:30	Piątek 45+2'	Report	43' 46' Schaub	Stadium: Başakşehir Fatih Terim Stadium; Attendance: 7,622; Referee: Adam Ladebäck (Sweden)

24 October 2024 2	Rapid	1–0	(Armenia) FC Noah	Vienna, Austria
18:45	Beljo 31'	Report		Stadium: Weststadion; Attendance: 18,500; Referee: Kristo Tohver (Estonia)

7 November 2024 3	Petrocub Hîncești (Moldova)	0–3	Rapid	Chișinău, Moldova
18:45		Report	13' Bolla; 53' 79' Burgstaller	Stadium: Zimbru Stadium; Referee: Antoni Bandić (Bosnia and Herzegovina)

28 November 2024 4	Rapid	1–1	(Republic of Ireland) Shamrock Rovers	Vienna, Austria
21:00	Cvetković 9'	Report	55' Kenny	Stadium: Weststadion; Attendance: 20,700; Referee: Gergo Bogár (Hungary)

12 December 2024 5	AC Omonia (Cyprus)	3–1	Rapid	Nicosia, Cyprus
21:00	Kakoullis 52'; Semedo 66'; Alioum 90+6'	Report	62' Beljo	Stadium: GSP Stadium; Attendance: 7,800; Referee: Daniel Stefanski (Poland)

19 December 2024 6	Rapid	3–0	(Denmark) FC Copenhagen	Vienna, Austria
21:00	Beljo 45+2'; Wurmbrand 51' 64'	Report		Stadium: Weststadion; Attendance: 24,465; Referee: John Beaton (Scotland)

==== Round of 16 ====
6 March 2025 First leg	Borac Banja Luka (Bosnia and Herzegovina)	1–1	Rapid	Banja Luka, Bosnia and Herzegovina
21:00	Vuković 90+2' (pen.)	Report	34' Beljo	Stadium: Banja Luka City Stadium; Attendance: 9,652; Referee: Jérôme Brisard (France)

13 March 2025 Second leg	Rapid	2–1 (a.e.t.) (3–2 agg.)	(Bosnia and Herzegovina) Borac Banja Luka	Vienna, Austria
18:45	Beljo 70'; Schaub 96'	Report	66' Ogrinec	Stadium: Weststadion; Attendance: 23,000; Referee: Allard Lindhout (Netherlands)

==== Quarter-finals ====
10 April 2025 First leg	Djurgården (Sweden)	0–1	Rapid	Stockholm, Sweden
21:00		Report	62' (o.g.) Finndell	Stadium: Stockholmsarenan; Attendance: 23,500; Referee: Tobias Stieler (Germany)

17 April 2025 Second Leg	Rapid	1–4 (a.e.t.) (2–4 agg.)	(Sweden) Djurgården	Vienna, Austria
21:00	Sangaré (red card) 7'; Une 45+1' (o.g.); Raux-Yao (red card) 110'	Report	42' (pen.) Danielson; 77' Kosugi; 93' 105' Gulliksen	Stadium: Weststadion; Attendance: 25,600; Referee: Anthony Taylor (England)
