= Noah Bischof =

Austrian footballer (born 2002)

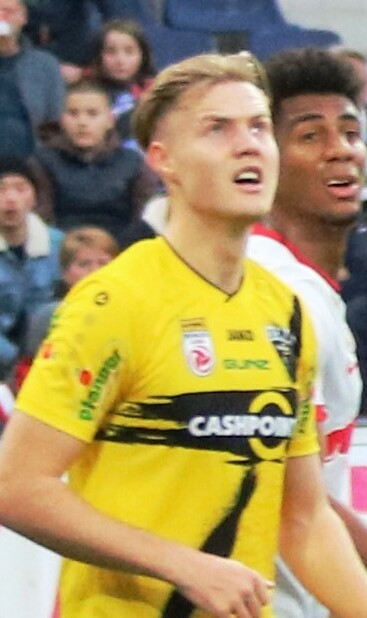
- Bischof in 2023

Personal information
- Date of birth: 7 December 2002 (age 23)
- Place of birth: Feldkirch, Austria
- Height: 1.85 m (6 ft 1 in)
- Position: Midfielder

Team information
- Current team: Dordrecht
- Number: 77

Youth career
- 2009–2012: SC Göfis
- 2012–2016: Rheindorf Altach
- 2016–2021: AKA Vorarlberg

Senior career*
Years	Team	Apps	(Gls)
2021–2024	Rheindorf Altach II	5	(5)
2021–2024	Rheindorf Altach	58	(5)
2024–2026	Rapid Wien	14	(1)
2024	→ First Vienna (loan)	14	(9)
2026–	Dordrecht	5	(0)

International career^{‡}
2022–2024	Austria U21	10	(3)
- * Club domestic league appearances and goals as of 28 April 2026 ‡ National team caps and goals as of 7 June 2024

Noah Bischof (born 7 December 2002) is an Austrian professional footballer who plays as a midfielder for Eerste Divisie side Dordrecht.

== Club career ==
Bischof began his career with SC Göfis. He moved to Rheindorf Altach in 2012, before joining the youth academy of AKA Vorarlberg in 2016, where he progressed through all age groups. In September 2020, he signed a professional contract with his parent club Rheindorf Altach. He joined their professional squad for the 2021–22 season, and made his Austrian Bundesliga debut on 24 July 2021, when he came off the bench for Atdhe Nuhiu in the 63rd minute on the first matchday of the season against LASK, which ended in a 1–0 home loss. He scored his first senior goal on 24 October 2021, the 1–0 winner against LASK from an assist by Nosa Iyobosa Edokpolor.

On 18 January 2024, Bischof signed for Austrian Bundesliga club Rapid Wien on a two-and-a-half-year contract. Upon his transfer to the club, he immediately joined Austrian 2. Liga club First Vienna on loan until the end of the season.

On 2 February 2026, Bischof signed for Dutch side FC Dordrecht in the Eerste Divisie on a contract until mid-2027.

== International career ==
Bischof received his first call-up to the under-21 squad for European Championship qualifiers against Croatia and Norway in March 2022, but did not make an appearance during the games. He made his under-21 debut on 17 November 2022 in a friendly against Turkey, replacing Christoph Lang after halftime.

== Career statistics ==
As of match played 11 May 2025

Appearances and goals by club, season and competition
Club	Season	League			Austrian Cup		Other		Total	
Club	Season	Division	Apps	Goals	Apps	Goals	Apps	Goals	Apps	Goals
Rheindorf Altach II	2021–22	Vorarlbergliga	3	5	—		—		3	5
Rheindorf Altach II	2022–23	Austrian Regionalliga	2	0	—		—		2	0
Rheindorf Altach II	Total		5	5	—		—		5	5
Rheindorf Altach	2021–22	Austrian Bundesliga	23	2	1	0	—		24	2
Rheindorf Altach	2022–23	Austrian Bundesliga	23	3	1	0	0	0	24	3
Rheindorf Altach	2023–24	Austrian Bundesliga	14	0	2	0	0	0	16	0
Rheindorf Altach	Total		60	5	4	0	0	0	64	5
Rapid Wien	2024–25	Austrian Bundesliga	14	1	2	0	12 (Note: Two appearances in UEFA Europa League, ten appearances in UEFA Conference League)	0	28	1
Career total			79	11	6	0	12	0	97	11
