= Nikolaus Wurmbrand =

Austrian footballer

Personal information
- Full name: Nikolaus Wurmbrand
- Date of birth: 5 January 2006 (age 20)
- Place of birth: Vienna, Austria
- Height: 1.73 m (5 ft 8 in)
- Position: Right winger

Team information
- Current team: Rapid Wien
- Number: 15

Youth career
- Nußdorfer AC
- 2016–2023: SK Rapid Wien

Senior career*
| Years | Team | Apps | (Gls) |
| 2023– | Rapid Wien II | 10 | (6) |
| 2024– | Rapid Wien | 55 | (6) |

International career^{‡}
| 2021–2024 | Austria U16 | 8 | (5) |
| 2024 | Austria U18 | 1 | (0) |
| 2024–2025 | Austria U19 | 3 | (0) |
| 2024– | Austria U21 | 6 | (2) |
| 2025– | Austria | 2 | (1) |
- * Club domestic league appearances and goals as of 24 October 2026 ‡ National team caps and goals as of 6 October 2026

Nikolaus Wurmbrand (born 5 January 2006) is an Austrian footballer who plays as a winger for Rapid Wien and the Austria national team.

A product of the Rapid Wien youth academy, Wurmbrand was promoted to the first team in 2024, making his senior debut for the club in August 2024 in the UEFA Europa League and scoring on his Austrian Football Bundesliga debut the following month.

== Club career ==
Wurmbrand joined SK Rapid Wien at age 10, having been spotted by scout Nino Rauch while playing for Nußdorfer AC. On 10 August 2024, Wurmbrand scored a hat-trick for the reserve team in a 4–2 home win over their counterparts from SK Sturm Graz on the second day of the 2. Liga season. Nineteen days later he made his first-team debut in a 2–2 home draw with S.C. Braga in the UEFA Europa League playoffs, playing the final minute in place of Mamadou Sangaré.

On 14 September 2024, Wurmbrand played his first game in the Austrian Football Bundesliga, starting away to Wolfsberger AC; assisted by Sangaré, he opened the scoring in a 1–1 draw. He scored twice on 19 December in a 3–0 win over FC Copenhagen at the Allianz Stadion as his team advanced from the UEFA Conference League league phase.

== International career ==
On 11 October 2024, Wurmbrand made his debut for the Austria under-21 team in a home European qualifier against Slovenia. He came on as a half-time substitute for Muharem Husković in a 1–1 draw in Wiener Neustadt.

Wurmbrand made his senior international debut for Austria on 9 October 2025, in a 2026 FIFA World Cup qualifier at home to San Marino. He came on for Stefan Posch in the 72nd minute, and four minutes later scored the eighth goal of a 10–0 win.

== Career statistics ==
=== Club ===
As of match played 27 October 2026

Appearances and goals by club, season and competition
| Club | Season | League | | | National cup | | Continental | | Other | | Total | |
| Club | Season | Division | Apps | Goals | Apps | Goals | Apps | Goals | Apps | Goals | Apps | Goals |
|---|---|---|---|---|---|---|---|---|---|---|---|---|
| SK Rapid Wien II | 2023–24 | Austrian Regionalliga East | 4 | 1 | — | | — | | — | | 4 | 1 |
| SK Rapid Wien II | 2024–25 | 2. Liga | 6 | 5 | — | | — | | — | | 6 | 5 |
| SK Rapid Wien II | Total | | 10 | 6 | — | | — | | — | | 10 | 6 |
| Rapid Wien | 2024–25 | Austrian Bundesliga | 17 | 1 | 2 | 0 | 9 (Note: One appearance in UEFA Europa League, eight appearances and two goals in UEFA Conference League) | 2 | — | | 28 | 3 |
| Rapid Wien | 2025–26 | Austrian Bundesliga | 29 | 4 | 3 | 0 | 9 (Note: Appearances in UEFA Conference League) | 1 | — | | 41 | 5 |
| Rapid Wien | 2026–27 | Austrian Bundesliga | 10 | 1 | 2 | 3 | 6 | 2 | — | | 18 | 6 |
| Rapid Wien | Total | | 55 | 6 | 7 | 3 | 24 | 5 | — | | 87 | 14 |
| Career total | | | 66 | 12 | 7 | 3 | 24 | 5 | 0 | 0 | 98 | 20 |

=== International ===
As of match played 15 November 2025

Appearances and goals by national team and year
| National team | Year | Apps | Goals |
|---|---|---|---|
| Austria | 2025 | 2 | 1 |
| Total | | 2 | 1 |

Scores and results list Austria's goal tally first, score column indicates score after each Wurmbrand goal.

List of international goals scored by Nikolaus Wurmbrand
| No. | Date | Venue | Opponent | Score | Result | Competition |
|---|---|---|---|---|---|---|
| 1. | 9 October 2025 | Ernst-Happel-Stadion, Vienna, Austria | San Marino | 8–0 | 10–0 | 2026 FIFA World Cup qualification |
