= Raimund Hedl =

Austrian footballer

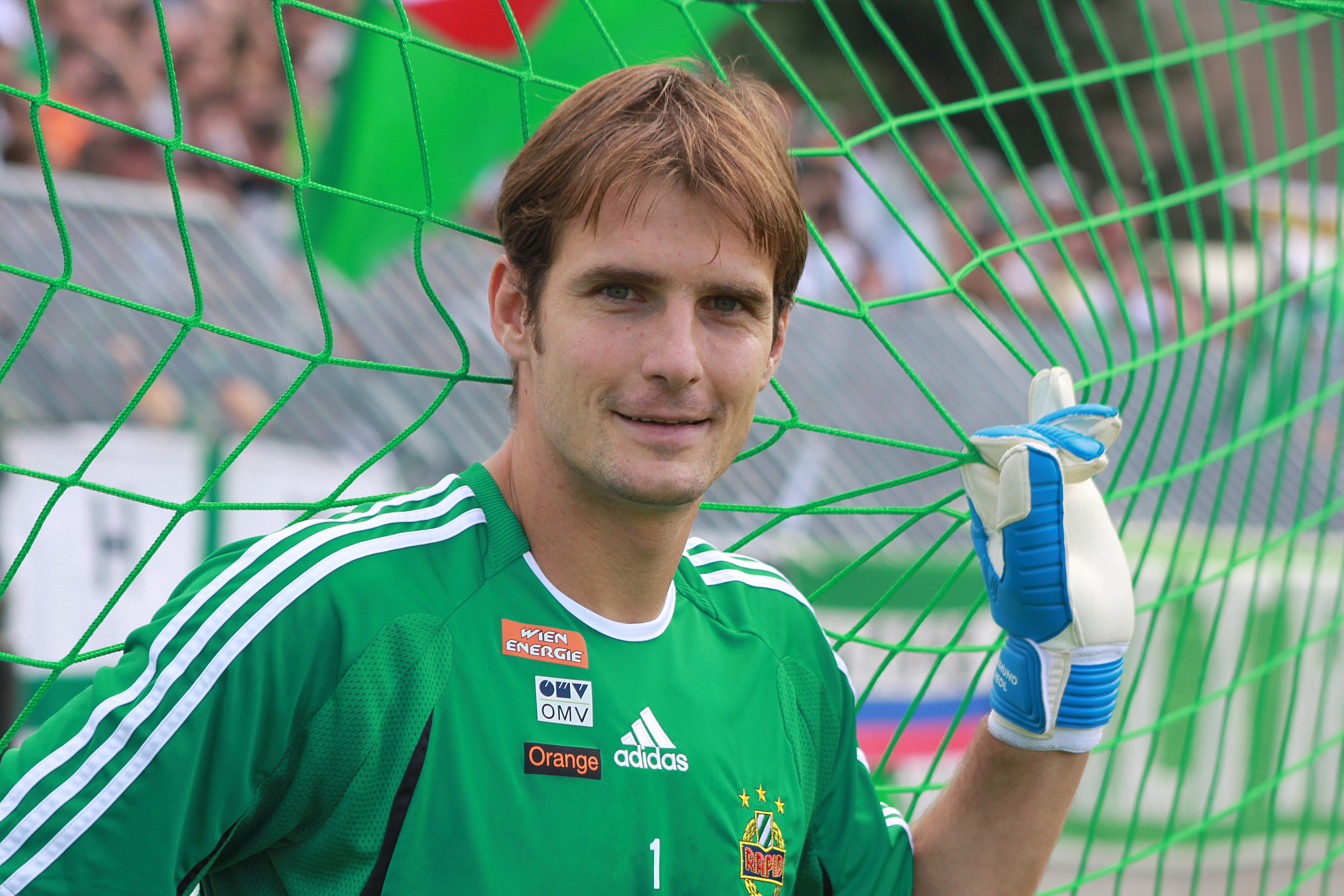

Personal information
- Date of birth: 31 August 1974 (age 52)
- Place of birth: Vienna, Austria
- Height: 1.88 m (6 ft 2 in)
- Position: Goalkeeper

Youth career
- MAC Wien
- –1994: Gaswerk/Straßenbahn Wien

Senior career*
Years	Team	Apps	(Gls)
1994–2001	Rapid Wien	33	(0)
2001	LASK	16	(0)
2002–2004	SV Mattersburg	80	(0)
2005–2011	Rapid Wien	51	(0)
Total		180	(0)

Managerial career
- 2011–: Rapid Wien (goalkeeping coach)
- * Club domestic league appearances and goals

Raimund Hedl (born 31 August 1974) is an Austrian former footballer who played as a goalkeeper. He is a current goalkeeping coach of Rapid Wien.

== Personal life ==
Hedl's sons, Niklas and Tobias, are professional footballers at Rapid Wien.

== Honours ==
Rapid Wien

- Austrian Football Bundesliga: 2008
