= Nenad N. Cvetković =

Serbian footballer

Nenad Cvetković
Personal information
- Date of birth: 6 January 1996 (age 30)
- Place of birth: Užice, FR Yugoslavia
- Height: 1.94 m (6 ft 4 in)
- Position: Centre-back

Team information
- Current team: Rapid Wien
- Number: 55

Youth career
- Red Star Belgrade

Senior career*
Years	Team	Apps	(Gls)
2014–2015	Red Star Belgrade	0	(0)
2014	→ IM Rakovica (loan)	14	(0)
2015	→ Radnički Beograd (loan)	13	(2)
2016–2019	Zemun	82	(6)
2019–2020	Voždovac	21	(0)
2020–2023	Ashdod	91	(7)
2023–	Rapid Wien	64	(7)
- * Club domestic league appearances and goals as of 25 October 2026

Nenad Cvetković (Serbian Cyrillic: Ненад Цветковић; born 6 January 1996) is a Serbian professional footballer who plays as a centre-back for Austrian Bundesliga club Rapid Wien.

== Club career ==
Born in Užice, Cvetković came through the Red Star Belgrade youth system. In summer 2014, he was loaned out to Serbian League Belgrade side IM Rakovica. In July 2015, Cvetković signed his first professional contract with Red Star. He was loaned out to Radnički Beograd for the 2015–16 Serbian League Belgrade season.

In early 2016, Cvetković signed with Serbian First League club Zemun.

On 27 July 2020, Cvetković signed with Israeli Premier League club F.C. Ashdod.

On 16 June 2023, Cvetković signed with Austrian Bundesliga club Rapid Wien.

== Career statistics ==
As of match played 27 October 2026

Appearances and goals by club, season and competition
Club	Season	League			Cup		Continental		Other		Total	
Club	Season	Division	Apps	Goals	Apps	Goals	Apps	Goals	Apps	Goals	Apps	Goals
Red Star Belgrade	2014–15	Serbian SuperLiga	0	0	0	0	—		—		0	0
Red Star Belgrade	2015–16	Serbian SuperLiga	0	0	0	0	0	0	—		0	0
Red Star Belgrade	Total		0	0	0	0	0	0	—		0	0
IM Rakovica (loan)	2014–15	Serbian League Belgrade	14	0	—		—		—		14	0
Radnički Beograd (loan)	2015–16	Serbian League Belgrade	13	2	—		—		—		13	2
Zemun	2015–16	Serbian First League	12	0	0	0	—		—		12	0
Zemun	2016–17	Serbian First League	24	4	1	0	—		—		25	4
Zemun	2017–18	Serbian SuperLiga	30	1	1	0	—		—		31	1
Zemun	2018–19	Serbian SuperLiga	16	1	2	1	—		—		18	2
Zemun	Total		82	6	4	1	—		—		86	7
Voždovac	2019–20	Serbian SuperLiga	21	0	0	0	—		—		21	0
Ashdod	2020–21	Israeli Premier League	33	2	2	0	—		4	0	39	2
Ashdod	2021–22	Israeli Premier League	26	2	1	0	2	0	2	0	31	2
Ashdod	2022–23	Israeli Premier League	32	3	5	0	—		1	0	38	3
Ashdod	Total		91	7	8	0	2	0	7	0	108	7
Rapid Wien II	2023–24	Austrian Regionalliga East	1	0	—		—		—		1	0
Rapid Wien	2023–24	Austrian Bundesliga	7	0	1	0	2 (Note: Appearance(s) in UEFA Europa Conference League)	0	—		10	0
Rapid Wien	2024–25	Austrian Bundesliga	20	2	0	0	15 (Note: Five appearances in UEFA Europa League, ten appearances and one goal in UEFA Europa Conference League)	1	—		35	3
Rapid Wien	2025–26	Austrian Bundesliga	28	2	3	0	9	0	—		40	2
Rapid Wien	2026–27	Austrian Bundesliga	9	3	1	0	6	2	—		16	5
Rapid Wien	Total		64	6	5	0	32	3	—		101	10
Career total			286	22	17	1	34	3	7	0	344	26
