= Andrass Johansen =

Faroese footballer (born 2001)

Personal information
- Full name: Andrass Johansen
- Date of birth: 16 November 2001 (age 24)
- Place of birth: Tórshavn, Faroe Islands
- Position: Attacking midfielder

Senior career*
Years	Team	Apps	(Gls)
2017–2020	B36 Tórshavn U21	17	(9)
2018–2021	B36 Tórshavn II	25	(15)
2018–2025	B36 Tórshavn	108	(14)
2025–2026	Fremad Amager	30	(5)

International career^{‡}
2017	Faroe Islands U17	4	(0)
2021–2022	Faroe Islands U21	5	(1)
2023–	Faroe Islands	6	(0)
- * Club domestic league appearances and goals as of 1 October 2026 ‡ National team caps and goals as of 11:00, 1 April 2024 (UTC)

Andrass Johansen (born 16 November 2001) is a former Faroese footballer who played as an attacking midfielder for the Faroe Islands national team.

== Career ==
Johansen started his career at B36 Tórshavn, making his first-team debut at age 18 in a 5–1 win against Skála ÍF. He spent seven years at his hometown club before moving to Fremad Amager in January 2025.

On 20 July 2026, Johansen announced that he would take a break from football due to injuries.

== Career statistics ==
=== International ===
Faroe Islands
Year	Apps	Goals
2023	5	0
2024	1	0
Total	6	0

== Personal life ==
Johansen works as an assistant in the school club while also playing football.

== Honours ==
B36 Tórshavn

- Faroe Islands Cup: 2021
