= Niklas Hedl =

Austrian footballer (born 2001)

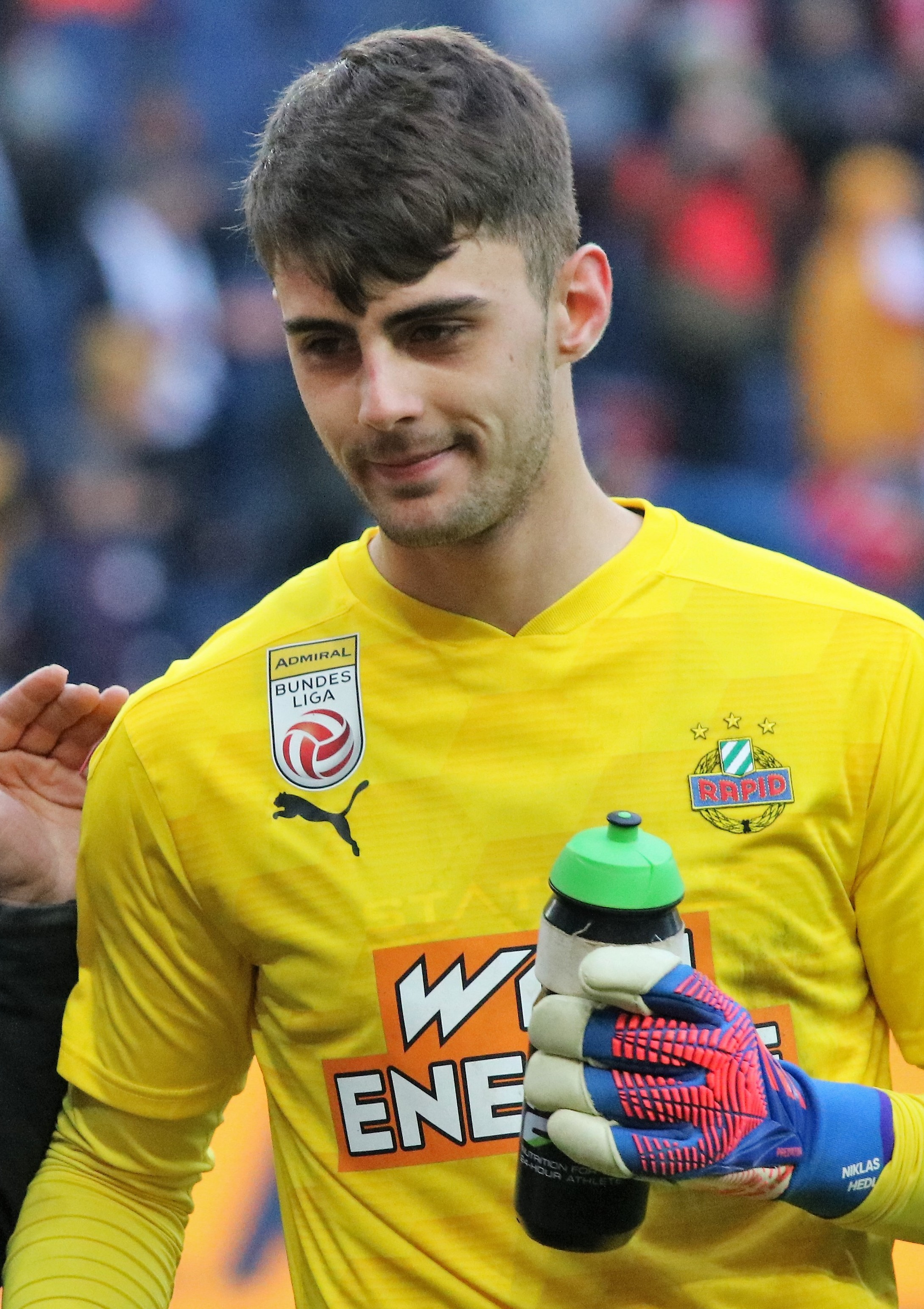
- Hedl in 2022

Personal information
- Date of birth: 17 March 2001 (age 25)
- Place of birth: Vienna, Austria
- Height: 1.88 m (6 ft 2 in)
- Position: Goalkeeper

Team information
- Current team: Rapid Wien
- Number: 1

Youth career
- 2007–2018: Rapid Wien

Senior career*
Years	Team	Apps	(Gls)
2018–2021	Rapid Wien II	55	(0)
2021–	Rapid Wien	137	(0)

International career^{‡}
2021–	Austria U21	10	(0)
2022–	Austria	1	(0)
- * Club domestic league appearances and goals as of 24 October 2026 ‡ National team caps and goals as of 22:55, 16 November 2022 (UTC)

Niklas Hedl (born 17 March 2001) is an Austrian professional footballer who plays as a goalkeeper for Austrian Bundesliga club Rapid Wien and the Austria national team.

== Club career ==
Hedl is a youth product of Rapid Wien's youth academy. He began his professional career with their reserves in 2020, before debuting for their senior team in a 2–2 Austrian Football Bundesliga tie with Sturm Graz on 20 February 2022.

== International career ==
Hedl is a youth international for Austria, having represented the Austria U21s. He was called up to the senior Austria national team for a set of UEFA Euro 2024 qualifying matches in September 2023.

== Personal life ==
Hedl's father, Raimund, was also a football goalkeeper and is currently the goalkeeper coach at Rapid Wien. His brother, Tobias, is a football forward and member of Rapid Wien's reserves.

== Career statistics ==
=== Club ===
As of match played 27 October 2026

Appearances and goals by club, season and competition
Club	Season	League			Cup		Continental		Other		Total	
Club	Season	Division	Apps	Goals	Apps	Goals	Apps	Goals	Apps	Goals	Apps	Goals
Rapid Wien II	2017–18	Austrian Regionalliga	0	0	0	0	—		—		0	0
Rapid Wien II	2018–19	Austrian Regionalliga	18	0	0	0	—		—		18	0
Rapid Wien II	2019–20	Austrian Regionalliga	8	0	0	0	—		—		8	0
Rapid Wien II	2020–21	Austrian Second League	22	0	0	0	0	0	—		22	0
Rapid Wien II	2021–22	Austrian Second League	7	0	0	0	0	0	—		7	0
Rapid Wien II	Total		55	0	0	0	0	0	—		55	0
Rapid Wien	2021–22	Austrian Bundesliga	10	0	0	0	1 (Note: Appearances in UEFA Europa Conference League)	0	—		11	0
Rapid Wien	2022–23	Austrian Bundesliga	31	0	5	0	6	0	—		42	0
Rapid Wien	2023–24	Austrian Bundesliga	32	0	5	0	4	0	—		41	0
Rapid Wien	2024–25	Austrian Bundesliga	30	0	3	0	16 (Note: Six appearances in UEFA Europa League, ten appearances in UEFA Conference League)	0	—		49	0
Rapid Wien	2025–26	Austrian Bundesliga	25	0	3	0	9	0	—		37	0
Rapid Wien	2026–27	Austrian Bundesliga	10	0	1	0	6	0	—		17	0
Rapid Wien	Total		138	0	18	0	42	0	—		198	0
Career total			193	0	18	0	42	0	0	0	253	0

=== International ===
As of match played 16 November 2022

Appearances and goals by national team and year
National team	Year	Apps	Goals
Austria	2022	1	0
Total		1	0
