= Metodi Maksimov =

Macedonian footballer

Personal information
- Full name: Metodi Maksimov; Методи Максимов
- Date of birth: 20 August 2002 (age 24)
- Place of birth: Kochani, Macedonia
- Height: 1.78 m (5 ft 10 in)
- Position: Right back

Team information
- Current team: LASK

Youth career
- 2015–2017: Bregalnica
- 2017–2020: Rabotnichki

Senior career*
Years	Team	Apps	(Gls)
2020–2023	Rabotnichki	65	(7)
2023–2024	Shkëndija	29	(1)
2024–	LASK	0	(0)
2024	→ Aalesund (loan)	5	(0)
2026–	LASK Amateure OÖ	2	(0)

International career^{‡}
2018	North Macedonia U17	2	(0)
2019	North Macedonia U18	4	(0)
2019–2020	North Macedonia U19	6	(0)
2021–2024	North Macedonia U21	28	(4)
2022–	North Macedonia	1	(0)
- * Club domestic league appearances and goals as of 27 June 2026 ‡ National team caps and goals as of 29 March 2024

Metodi Maksimov (Macedonian: Методи Максимов; born 20 August 2002) is a Macedonian professional footballer who plays as a right back or a right winger for Austrian Bundesliga club LASK.

== Career ==
=== Club career ===
==== Rabotnichki ====
Maksimov made his senior football debut on 9 August 2020 at the age of 17, by playing the opening 60 minutes for Rabotnichki against Makedonija G. P. in the first round of the 2020–21 Macedonian First Football League season. That season he went on to play 25 games, throughout which he also assisted two goals.

==== LASK ====
On 25 January 2024, Maksimov signed a long-term contract with Austrian club LASK and was immediately loaned to Aalesund in Norway.

==== Loan to Aalesunds ====
In Aalesunds, Maksimov made his debut on 15 April, he just made five caps with the club before out for the rest of the year due to injuries.

==== Return to LASK ====
On 1 January 2025, Maksimov return to the club after his loan spell ends.

== International career ==
Ever since 2018 Maksimov has been regular at most of North Macedonia's national youth teams.

He made his debut for North Macedonia national football team on 22 October 2022 in a friendly match against Saudi Arabia.

== Career statistics ==
=== Club ===
As of match played 11 May 2024

Appearances and goals by club, season and competition
Club	Season	League			Cup		Europe		Total	
Club	Season	Division	Apps	Goals	Apps	Goals	Apps	Goals	Apps	Goals
Rabotnichki	2020–21	Macedonian First Football League	25	0	0	0	—		25	0
Rabotnichki	2021–22	Macedonian First Football League	26	4	0	0	—		26	4
Rabotnichki	2022–23	Macedonian First Football League	14	3	0	0	—		14	3
Rabotnichki	Total		65	7	0	0	—		65	7
Shkëndija	2022–23	Macedonian First Football League	12	0	—		—		12	0
Shkëndija	2023–24	Macedonian First Football League	17	1	—		2 (Note: Appearances in UEFA Conference League)	0	19	1
Shkëndija	Total		29	1	—		2	0	31	1
LASK	2023–24	Austrian Bundesliga	0	0	0	0	—		0	0
LASK	2024–25	Austrian Bundesliga	0	0	0	0	0	0	0	0
LASK	Total		0	0	0	0	0	0	0	0
Aalesunds (loan)	2024	Eliteserien	5	0	2	0	—		7	0
Aalesunds II (loan)	2024	Norwegian Third Division	2	0	—		—		2	0
Career total			101	8	2	0	2	0	105	8

=== International ===
As of match played 29 March 2022

Appearances and goals by national team and year
National team	Year	Apps	Goals
North Macedonia	2022	1	0
Total		1	0
