= Christoph Lang =

Austrian footballer (born 2002)

Personal information
- Date of birth: 7 January 2002 (age 24)
- Place of birth: Deutschlandsberg, Austria
- Height: 1.78 m (5 ft 10 in)
- Position: Forward

Team information
- Current team: LASK
- Number: 27

Youth career
- 2009-2011: SV SW Lieboch
- 2011–2021: Sturm Graz

Senior career*
Years	Team	Apps	(Gls)
2020–2022	Sturm Graz II	43	(24)
2021–2023	Sturm Graz	12	(1)
2023	→ SV Ried (loan)	15	(3)
2023	→ TSV Hartberg (loan)	17	(5)
2024–2025	Rapid Wien	22	(2)
2025–	LASK	53	(15)

International career^{‡}
2022–2024	Austria U21	15	(4)
2026–	Austria	3	(1)
- * Club domestic league appearances and goals as of 31 October 2026 ‡ National team caps and goals as of 14 November 2026

Christoph Lang (born 7 January 2002) is an Austrian professional footballer who plays as a forward for Austrian Bundesliga club LASK and the Austria national team.

== Club career ==
Christoph Lang made his professional debut for Sturm Graz on the 17 July 2021, replacing Kelvin Yeboah and scoring a goal in a 9–0 Austrian Cup away win against ATSV Stadl-Paura.

After featuring infrequently for Sturm Graz's first team, Lang was sent out on loan to SV Ried for six months in January 2023.

For the 2023–24 season, Lang moved on a new loan to TSV Hartberg.

In January 2024, Lang signed a three-and-a-half-year contract with Rapid Wien.

On 6 February 2025, Lang moved to LASK on a two-and-a-half-year contract.

== International career ==
Lang is an Austria youth international, having represented the U21 team.

In September 2026, he was one of the players who were called up to the Austria national team by head coach Ralf Rangnick, for the 2026–27 UEFA Nations League B matches against Israel, Kosovo (twice) and Republic of Ireland on 24, 27 September, 1 and 4 October 2026.

== Career statistics ==
=== Club ===
As of match played 3 November 2026

Appearances and goals by club, season and competition
Club	Season	League			Austrian Cup		Europe		Total	
Club	Season	Division	Apps	Goals	Apps	Goals	Apps	Goals	Apps	Goals
Sturm Graz II	2020–21	Austrian Regionalliga Central	13	5	—		—		13	5
Sturm Graz II	2021–22	Austrian Regionalliga Central	18	14	—		—		18	14
Sturm Graz II	2022–23	2. Liga	12	5	—		—		12	5
Sturm Graz II	Total		43	24	—		—		43	24
Sturm Graz	2021–22	Austrian Bundesliga	9	0	2	1	1 (Note: Appearance in UEFA Europa League)	0	12	1
Sturm Graz	2022–23	Austrian Bundesliga	3	1	1	0	3 (Note: Two appearances in UEFA Champions League, one appearance in UEFA Europa League)	0	7	1
Sturm Graz	Total		12	1	3	1	4	0	19	2
SV Ried (loan)	2022–23	Austrian Bundesliga	15	3	2	1	—		17	4
TSV Hartberg (loan)	2023–24	Austrian Bundesliga	17	5	3	0	—		20	5
Rapid Wien	2023–24	Austrian Bundesliga	14	2	1	0	—		15	2
Rapid Wien	2024–25	Austrian Bundesliga	8	0	3	0	4 (Note: Three appearances and two goals in UEFA Europa League, one appearance in UEFA Conference League)	2	15	2
Rapid Wien	Total		22	2	4	0	4	2	30	4
LASK	2024–25	Austrian Bundesliga	16	3	1	0	—		17	3
LASK	2025–26	Austrian Bundesliga	26	5	5	1	—		31	6
LASK	2026–27	Austrian Bundesliga	11	7	3	5	6 (Note: Appearances in UEFA Champions League)	1	20	13
LASK	Total		53	15	9	6	6	1	68	22
Career total			162	50	21	8	14	3	197	61

=== International ===
As of match played 14 November 2026

Appearances and goals by national team and year
National team	Year	Apps	Goals
Austria	2026	3	1
Total		3	1

Scores and results list Austria's goal tally first, score column indicates score after each Lang goal.

List of international goals scored by Christoph Lang
No.	Date	Venue	Cap	Opponent	Score	Result	Competition
1	4 October 2026	Fadil Vokrri Stadium, Pristina, Kosovo	2	Kosovo	1–1	1–1	2026–27 UEFA Nations League B

== Honours ==
LASK

- Austrian Bundesliga: 2025–26
- Austrian Cup: 2025–26
