= 2003 FIFA Confederations Cup squads =

Squads who participated in the 2003 FIFA Confederations Cup.

== Group A ==
=== Colombia ===
Head coach: Francisco Maturana

No.	Pos.	Player	Date of birth (age)	Caps	Goals	Club
1	GK	Óscar Córdoba	3 February 1970 (aged 33)			(Turkish Football Federation) Beşiktaş
2	DF	Iván Córdoba (c)	11 August 1976 (aged 26)			(Italian Football Federation) Inter Milan
3	DF	Mario Yepes	13 January 1976 (aged 27)			(French Football Federation) Nantes
4	DF	Edgar Ramos	27 September 1979 (aged 23)			(Colombian Football Federation) Independiente Santa Fe
5	DF	José Mera	11 March 1979 (aged 24)			(Colombian Football Federation) Deportivo Cali
6	DF	Gerardo Vallejo	3 December 1976 (aged 26)			(Colombian Football Federation) Deportivo Cali
7	FW	Elson Becerra	26 April 1978 (aged 25)			(Colombian Football Federation) Deportes Tolima
8	MF	Arnulfo Valentierra	16 August 1974 (aged 28)			(Colombian Football Federation) Once Caldas
9	FW	Víctor Aristizábal	9 December 1971 (aged 31)			(Brazilian Football Confederation) Cruzeiro
10	MF	Giovanni Hernández	16 June 1976 (aged 27)			(Colombian Football Federation) Deportivo Cali
11	MF	Elkin Murillo	20 September 1977 (aged 25)			(Colombian Football Federation) Deportivo Cali
12	GK	Juan Carlos Henao	30 September 1971 (aged 31)			(Colombian Football Federation) Once Caldas
13	FW	Herly Alcázar	30 October 1976 (aged 26)			(Colombian Football Federation) Centauros Villavicencio
14	MF	Óscar Díaz	8 June 1972 (aged 31)			(Colombian Football Federation) Deportivo Cali
15	MF	Rubén Darío Velázquez	18 December 1975 (aged 27)			(Colombian Football Federation) Once Caldas
16	FW	Eudalio Arriaga	19 September 1975 (aged 27)			(Colombian Football Federation) Atlético Junior
17	FW	Martín Arzuaga	23 July 1981 (aged 21)			(Colombian Football Federation) Atlético Junior
18	MF	Jorge López Caballero	15 August 1981 (aged 21)			(Colombian Football Federation) Millonarios
19	DF	Andrés Mosquera	9 July 1978 (aged 24)			(Colombian Football Federation) Deportivo Cali
20	MF	Gerardo Bedoya	26 September 1975 (aged 27)			(Argentine Football Association) Racing Club
21	MF	Jairo Patiño	5 April 1978 (aged 25)			(Colombian Football Federation) Deportivo Cali
22	GK	Neco Martínez	11 July 1982 (aged 20)			(Colombian Football Federation) Envigado
23	DF	Gonzalo Martínez	30 November 1975 (aged 27)			(Italian Football Federation) Napoli

=== France ===
Head coach: Jacques Santini

No.	Pos.	Player	Date of birth (age)	Caps	Club
1	GK	Mickaël Landreau	14 May 1979 (aged 24)		(France) Nantes
2	DF	Philippe Mexès	30 March 1982 (aged 21)		(France) Auxerre
3	DF	Bixente Lizarazu	9 December 1969 (aged 33)		(Germany) Bayern Munich
4	DF	Jean-Alain Boumsong	14 September 1979 (aged 23)		(France) Auxerre
5	DF	William Gallas	17 August 1977 (aged 25)		(England) Chelsea
6	MF	Olivier Dacourt	25 September 1974 (aged 28)		(England) Leeds United
7	MF	Robert Pires	29 October 1973 (aged 29)		(England) Arsenal
8	MF	Marcel Desailly (c)	7 September 1968 (aged 34)		(England) Chelsea
9	FW	Djibril Cissé	12 August 1981 (aged 21)		(France) Auxerre
10	MF	Ludovic Giuly	10 July 1976 (aged 26)		(France) Monaco
11	FW	Sylvain Wiltord	10 May 1974 (aged 29)		(England) Arsenal
12	FW	Thierry Henry	17 August 1977 (aged 25)		(England) Arsenal
13	DF	Mikaël Silvestre	9 August 1977 (aged 25)		(England) Manchester United
14	MF	Jérôme Rothen	31 March 1978 (aged 25)		(France) Monaco
15	DF	Lilian Thuram	1 January 1972 (aged 31)		(Italy) Juventus
16	GK	Fabien Barthez	28 June 1971 (aged 31)		(England) Manchester United
17	MF	Olivier Kapo	27 September 1980 (aged 22)		(France) Auxerre
18	MF	Benoît Pedretti	12 November 1980 (aged 22)		(France) Sochaux
19	DF	Willy Sagnol	18 March 1977 (aged 26)		(Germany) Bayern Munich
20	FW	Steve Marlet	10 January 1974 (aged 29)		(England) Fulham
21	MF	Ousmane Dabo	8 February 1977 (aged 26)		(Italy) Atalanta
22	FW	Sidney Govou	27 July 1979 (aged 23)		(France) Lyon
23	GK	Grégory Coupet	31 December 1972 (aged 30)		(France) Lyon

=== Japan ===
Head coach: (Brazil) Zico

No.	Pos.	Player	Date of birth (age)	Caps	Goals	Club
1	GK	Seigo Narazaki	11 April 1976 (aged 27)	29	0	(Japan Football Association) Nagoya Grampus Eight
2	DF	Akira Narahashi	26 November 1971 (aged 31)	38	0	(Japan Football Association) Kashima Antlers
3	DF	Yutaka Akita	6 August 1970 (aged 32)	45	4	(Japan Football Association) Kashima Antlers
4	DF	Ryuzo Morioka	7 October 1975 (aged 27)	38	0	(Japan Football Association) Shimizu S-Pulse
5	MF	Junichi Inamoto	18 September 1979 (aged 23)	43	6	(The Football Association) Fulham
6	MF	Toshihiro Hattori	23 September 1973 (aged 29)	44	2	(Japan Football Association) Júbilo Iwata
7	MF	Hidetoshi Nakata (c)	22 January 1977 (aged 26)	51	9	(Italian Football Federation) Parma
8	MF	Mitsuo Ogasawara	5 April 1979 (aged 24)	11	0	(Japan Football Association) Kashima Antlers
9	FW	Yoshito Ōkubo	9 June 1982 (aged 21)	3	0	(Japan Football Association) Cerezo Osaka
10	MF	Shunsuke Nakamura	24 June 1978 (aged 24)	25	6	(Italian Football Federation) Reggina
11	MF	Daisuke Matsui	11 May 1981 (aged 22)	0	0	(Japan Football Association) Kyoto Purple Sanga
12	GK	Yoichi Doi	25 July 1973 (aged 29)	0	0	(Japan Football Association) FC Tokyo
13	MF	Daisuke Oku	7 February 1976 (aged 27)	23	2	(Japan Football Association) Yokohama F. Marinos
14	DF	Alex	20 July 1977 (aged 25)	14	1	(Japan Football Association) Shimizu S-Pulse
15	MF	Tomokazu Myojin	24 January 1978 (aged 25)	26	3	(Japan Football Association) Kashiwa Reysol
16	MF	Kōji Nakata	9 July 1979 (aged 23)	38	0	(Japan Football Association) Kashima Antlers
17	DF	Tsuneyasu Miyamoto	7 February 1977 (aged 26)	17	0	(Japan Football Association) Gamba Osaka
18	FW	Yuichiro Nagai	14 February 1979 (aged 24)	3	1	(Japan Football Association) Urawa Red Diamonds
19	MF	Yasuhito Endō	28 January 1980 (aged 23)	3	0	(Japan Football Association) Gamba Osaka
20	FW	Naohiro Takahara	4 June 1979 (aged 24)	21	9	(German Football Association) Hamburger SV
21	DF	Keisuke Tsuboi	16 September 1979 (aged 23)	1	0	(Japan Football Association) Urawa Red Diamonds
22	DF	Nobuhisa Yamada	10 September 1975 (aged 27)	2	0	(Japan Football Association) Urawa Red Diamonds
23	GK	Yoshikatsu Kawaguchi	15 August 1975 (aged 27)	54	0	(The Football Association) Portsmouth

=== New Zealand ===
Head coach: (England) Mick Waitt

No.	Pos.	Player	Date of birth (age)	Caps	Club
1	GK	Jason Batty	23 March 1971 (aged 32)		(New Zealand) Caversham
2	DF	Duncan Oughton	14 June 1977 (aged 26)		(United States) Columbus Crew
3	DF	Dave Mulligan	24 March 1982 (aged 21)		(England) Barnsley
4	DF	Chris Zoricich (c)	3 May 1969 (aged 34)		(Australia) Newcastle United
5	DF	Danny Hay	15 May 1975 (aged 28)		(England) Walsall
6	DF	Gavin Wilkinson	5 November 1973 (aged 29)		(United States) Portland Timbers
7	MF	Ivan Vicelich	3 September 1976 (aged 26)		(Netherlands) Roda JC
8	MF	Aaran Lines	27 December 1976 (aged 26)		(Poland) Ruch Chorzów
9	MF	Mark Burton	18 May 1974 (aged 29)		(New Zealand) Football Kingz
10	MF	Chris Jackson	18 July 1970 (aged 32)		(New Zealand) Football Kingz
11	FW	Chris Killen	8 October 1981 (aged 21)		(England) Oldham Athletic
12	GK	Michael Utting	26 May 1970 (aged 33)		(New Zealand) Football Kingz
13	DF	Christian Bouckenooghe	7 February 1977 (aged 26)		(Belgium) Ronse
14	DF	Ryan Nelsen	18 October 1977 (aged 25)		(United States) D.C. United
15	FW	Shane Smeltz	29 September 1981 (aged 21)		(Australia) Adelaide City Force
16	FW	Vaughan Coveny	13 December 1971 (aged 31)		(Australia) South Melbourne
17	MF	Raf de Gregorio	20 May 1977 (aged 26)		(New Zealand) Football Kingz
18	DF	Scott Smith	6 March 1975 (aged 28)		(England) Kingstonian
19	MF	Simon Elliott	10 June 1974 (aged 29)		(United States) Los Angeles Galaxy
20	DF	Gerard Davis	25 September 1977 (aged 25)		Unattached
21	MF	Noah Hickey	9 June 1978 (aged 25)		(Finland) Tampere United
22	MF	Michael Wilson	25 November 1980 (aged 22)		(United States) Stanford Cardinal
23	GK	Mark Paston	13 December 1976 (aged 26)		(New Zealand) Napier City Rovers

== Group B ==
=== Brazil ===
Head coach: Carlos Alberto Parreira

No.	Pos.	Player	Date of birth (age)	Caps	Goals	Club
1	GK	Dida	7 October 1973 (aged 29)	53	0	(Italian Football Federation) Milan
2	DF	Juliano Belletti	20 June 1976 (aged 26)	17	1	(Royal Spanish Football Federation) Villarreal
3	DF	Lúcio	8 May 1978 (aged 25)	25	0	(German Football Association) Bayer Leverkusen
4	DF	Juan	1 February 1979 (aged 24)	11	0	(German Football Association) Bayer Leverkusen
5	MF	Emerson (c)	4 April 1976 (aged 27)	47	5	(Italian Football Federation) Roma
6	DF	Gilberto	25 April 1976 (aged 27)	2	0	(Brazilian Football Confederation) Grêmio
7	FW	Ronaldinho	21 March 1980 (aged 23)	39	14	(French Football Federation) Paris Saint-Germain
8	MF	Kléberson	19 June 1979 (aged 23)	16	2	(The Football Association) Manchester United
9	FW	Adriano	17 February 1982 (aged 21)	5	1	(Italian Football Federation) Parma
10	MF	Ricardinho	23 May 1976 (aged 27)	8	0	(Brazilian Football Confederation) São Paulo
11	MF	Gil	13 September 1980 (aged 22)	1	1	(Brazilian Football Confederation) Corinthians
12	GK	Júlio César	7 October 1979 (aged 23)	0	0	(Brazilian Football Confederation) Flamengo
13	DF	Maurinho	11 October 1978 (aged 24)	1	0	(Brazilian Football Confederation) Cruzeiro
14	DF	Fábio Luciano	29 April 1975 (aged 28)	5	1	(Brazilian Football Confederation) Corinthians
15	DF	Edu Dracena	18 May 1981 (aged 22)	0	0	(Hellenic Football Federation) Olympiacos
16	DF	Kléber	1 April 1980 (aged 23)	4	0	(Brazilian Football Confederation) Corinthians
17	MF	Eduardo Costa	23 September 1982 (aged 20)	4	0	(French Football Federation) Bordeaux
18	MF	Dudu Cearense	15 April 1983 (aged 20)	0	0	(Brazilian Football Confederation) Vitória
19	MF	Adriano Gabiru	8 November 1977 (aged 25)	2	0	(Brazilian Football Confederation) Atlético Paranaense
20	MF	Alex	14 September 1977 (aged 25)	25	8	(Brazilian Football Confederation) Cruzeiro
21	FW	Ilan	18 September 1980 (aged 22)	0	0	(Brazilian Football Confederation) Atlético Paranaense
22	FW	Luís Fabiano	8 November 1980 (aged 22)	2	0	(Brazilian Football Confederation) São Paulo
23	GK	Fábio	30 September 1980 (aged 22)	1	0	(Brazilian Football Confederation) Vasco da Gama

=== Cameroon ===
Head coach: (Germany) Winfried Schäfer

No.	Pos.	Player	Date of birth (age)	Caps	Club
1	GK	Carlos Kameni	18 February 1984 (aged 19)		(France) Saint-Étienne
2	DF	Bill Tchato	14 May 1975 (aged 28)		(France) Montpellier
3	DF	Jean-Joël Perrier-Doumbé	27 September 1978 (aged 24)		(France) Auxerre
4	DF	Rigobert Song (c)	1 July 1976 (aged 26)		(France) Lens
5	DF	Timothée Atouba	17 February 1982 (aged 21)		(Switzerland) Basel
6	DF	Pierre Njanka	15 March 1975 (aged 28)		(France) Strasbourg
7	MF	Modeste M'bami	9 October 1982 (aged 20)		(France) Sedan
8	MF	Geremi Njitap	20 December 1978 (aged 24)		(England) Middlesbrough
9	FW	Samuel Eto'o	10 March 1981 (aged 22)		(Spain) Mallorca
10	MF	Achille Emaná	5 June 1982 (aged 21)		(France) Toulouse
11	FW	Pius N'Diefi	5 July 1975 (aged 27)		(France) Sedan
12	GK	Eric Kwekeu	11 March 1980 (aged 23)		(Cameroon) Bamboutos
13	DF	Lucien Mettomo	19 April 1977 (aged 26)		(Germany) 1. FC Kaiserslautern
14	MF	Joël Epalle	20 February 1978 (aged 25)		(Greece) Aris
15	DF	Gustave Bahoken	19 June 1979 (aged 23)		(Scotland) Livingston
16	MF	Valéry Mézague	8 December 1983 (aged 19)		(France) Montpellier
17	MF	Marc-Vivien Foé (until 26 June)	1 May 1975 (aged 28)		(England) Manchester City
18	FW	Mohammadou Idrissou	8 March 1980 (aged 23)		(Germany) Hannover 96
19	MF	Eric Djemba-Djemba	4 May 1981 (aged 22)		(France) Nantes
20	MF	Nana Falemi	5 May 1974 (aged 29)		(Romania) Steaua București
21	FW	Joseph-Désiré Job	1 December 1977 (aged 25)		(England) Middlesbrough
22	FW	Claude Ngon A Djam	24 January 1980 (aged 23)		(Cameroon) Canon Yaoundé
23	GK	André-Joël Eboué	25 June 1974 (aged 28)		(France) Stade Beaucairois

After the team's Semi-final match, midfielder Marc-Vivien Foé died and was not replaced.

=== Turkey ===
Head coach: Şenol Güneş

No.	Pos.	Player	Date of birth (age)	Caps	Goals	Club
1	GK	Rüştü Reçber	10 May 1973 (aged 30)	79	0	(Turkish Football Federation) Fenerbahçe
2	DF	Fatih Sonkaya	1 July 1981 (aged 21)	1	0	(Royal Dutch Football Association) Roda JC
3	DF	Bülent Korkmaz (c)	24 November 1968 (aged 34)	84	3	(Turkish Football Federation) Galatasaray
4	DF	Fatih Akyel	26 December 1977 (aged 25)	53	0	(Turkish Football Federation) Fenerbahçe
5	DF	Alpay Özalan	29 May 1973 (aged 30)	77	4	(The Football Association) Aston Villa
6	DF	Ergün Penbe	17 May 1972 (aged 31)	34	0	(Turkish Football Federation) Galatasaray
7	MF	Serkan Balcı	22 August 1983 (aged 19)	0	0	(Turkish Football Federation) Gençlerbirliği
8	MF	Volkan Arslan	29 August 1978 (aged 24)	3	0	(Turkish Football Federation) Kocaelispor
9	FW	Tuncay Şanlı	16 January 1982 (aged 21)	0	0	(Turkish Football Federation) Fenerbahçe
10	FW	Yıldıray Baştürk	24 December 1978 (aged 24)	28	1	(German Football Association) Bayer Leverkusen
11	FW	Nihat Kahveci	23 November 1979 (aged 23)	21	5	(Royal Spanish Football Federation) Real Sociedad
12	GK	Ömer Çatkıç	15 October 1974 (aged 28)	10	0	(Turkish Football Federation) Gaziantepspor
13	DF	Ahmet Yıldırım	25 April 1974 (aged 29)	1	0	(Turkish Football Federation) Beşiktaş
14	DF	Deniz Barış	2 July 1977 (aged 25)	2	0	(Turkish Football Federation) Gençlerbirliği
15	DF	İbrahim Üzülmez	10 March 1974 (aged 29)	4	0	(Turkish Football Federation) Beşiktaş
16	FW	Okan Yılmaz	16 May 1978 (aged 25)	1	0	(Turkish Football Federation) Bursaspor
17	DF	Servet Çetin	17 March 1981 (aged 22)	1	0	(Turkish Football Federation) Fenerbahçe
18	FW	Hüseyin Kartal	1 January 1982 (aged 21)	0	0	(Turkish Football Federation) Ankaragücü
19	FW	Necati Ateş	3 January 1980 (aged 23)	0	0	(Turkish Football Federation) Adanaspor
20	MF	Selçuk Şahin	31 January 1981 (aged 22)	0	0	(Turkish Football Federation) İstanbulspor
21	MF	İbrahim Toraman	20 November 1981 (aged 21)	0	0	(Turkish Football Federation) Gaziantepspor
22	MF	Gökdeniz Karadeniz	11 January 1980 (aged 23)	2	1	(Turkish Football Federation) Trabzonspor
23	GK	Murat Şahin	4 February 1976 (aged 27)	0	0	(Turkish Football Federation) Adanaspor

=== United States ===
Head coach: Bruce Arena

No.	Pos.	Player	Date of birth (age)	Caps	Goals	Club
1	GK	Joe Cannon	1 January 1975 (aged 28)	-	-	(French Football Federation) Lens
2	MF	Frankie Hejduk	5 August 1974 (aged 28)	46	5	(United States Soccer Federation) Columbus Crew
3	DF	Gregg Berhalter	1 August 1973 (aged 29)	29	0	(German Football Association) Energie Cottbus
4	MF	Pablo Mastroeni	26 August 1976 (aged 26)	19	0	(United States Soccer Federation) Colorado Rapids
5	DF	Greg Vanney	11 June 1974 (aged 29)	19	0	(French Football Federation) Bastia
6	DF	Steve Cherundolo	19 February 1979 (aged 24)	12	0	(German Football Association) Hannover 96
7	MF	Eddie Lewis	17 May 1974 (aged 29)	44	4	(The Football Association) Preston North End
8	MF	Earnie Stewart (c)	28 March 1969 (aged 34)	87	15	(United States Soccer Federation) D.C. United
9	FW	Jovan Kirovski	18 March 1976 (aged 27)	56	8	(The Football Association) Birmingham City
10	FW	Landon Donovan	4 March 1982 (aged 21)	35	9	(United States Soccer Federation) San Jose Earthquakes
11	MF	Clint Mathis	25 November 1976 (aged 26)	30	11	(United States Soccer Federation) MetroStars
12	DF	Carlos Bocanegra	25 May 1979 (aged 24)	12	2	(United States Soccer Federation) Chicago Fire
13	MF	Kyle Martino	19 February 1981 (aged 22)	1	0	(United States Soccer Federation) Columbus Crew
14	MF	Chris Armas	27 August 1972 (aged 30)	47	2	(United States Soccer Federation) Chicago Fire
15	MF	Bobby Convey	27 May 1983 (aged 20)	9	0	(United States Soccer Federation) D.C. United
16	DF	Danny Califf	17 March 1980 (aged 23)	6	0	(United States Soccer Federation) Los Angeles Galaxy
17	MF	DaMarcus Beasley	24 May 1982 (aged 21)	20	3	(United States Soccer Federation) Chicago Fire
18	GK	Tim Howard	6 March 1979 (aged 24)	6	0	(United States Soccer Federation) MetroStars
19	GK	Marcus Hahnemann	15 June 1972 (aged 31)	3	0	(The Football Association) Reading
20	FW	Taylor Twellman	29 February 1980 (aged 23)	3	0	(United States Soccer Federation) New England Revolution
21	FW	Jeff Cunningham	21 August 1976 (aged 26)	8	0	(United States Soccer Federation) Columbus Crew
22	MF	Chris Klein	4 January 1976 (aged 27)	12	2	(United States Soccer Federation) Kansas City Wizards
23	DF	Cory Gibbs	14 January 1980 (aged 23)			(German Football Association) FC St. Pauli
