= 2003 FIFA Confederations Cup knockout stage =

FIFA 2003 Knockout

The knockout stage of the 2003 FIFA Confederations Cup began on 26 June with the semi-final round, and concluded on 29 June 2003 with the final at Stade de France in Saint-Denis. The top two teams from each group advanced to the knockout stage to compete in a single-elimination style tournament. A third place match was included and played between the two losing teams of the semi-finals.

In the knockout stage (including the final), if a match was level at the end of 90 minutes, extra time of two periods (15 minutes each) would be played. If the score was still level after extra time, the match would be decided by a penalty shoot-out. Additionally, a golden goal rule was used, according to which if the goal is scored during the extra time, the game ends immediately and the scoring team becomes the winner.

== Qualified teams ==
Group	Winners	Runners-up
A	France	Colombia
B	Cameroon	Turkey

== Bracket ==
Semi-finals
26 June - Lyon
Cameroon	1
Colombia	0
26 June - Saint-Denis
France	3
Turkey	2

Final
29 June - Saint-Denis
Cameroon	0
France (a.s.d.e.t.)	1
Third place
28 June - Saint-Étienne
Colombia	1
Turkey	2

== Semi-finals ==
=== Cameroon v Colombia ===
The match is remembered for the death of Marc-Vivien Foé. In the 72nd minute of the match, Foé collapsed in the centre circle with no other players near him. After attempts to resuscitate him on the pitch, he was stretchered off the field, where he received mouth-to-mouth resuscitation and oxygen. Medics spent 45 minutes attempting to restart his heart, and although he was still alive upon arrival at the stadium's medical centre, he died shortly afterwards. A first autopsy did not determine an exact cause of death, but a second autopsy concluded that Foé's death was heart-related as it discovered evidence of hypertrophic cardiomyopathy, a hereditary condition known to increase the risk of sudden death during physical exercise.

26 June 2003
18:00 CEST

Cameroon	1–0	Colombia
N'Diefi 9'	Report

Stade de Gerland, Lyon
Attendance: 12,352
Referee: Markus Merk (Germany)

Cameroon	Colombia

GK	1	Carlos Kameni	(yellow card) 37'
DF	2	Bill Tchato	(yellow card) 43' (yellow-red card) 69'
DF	4	Rigobert Song
DF	6	Pierre Njanka
DF	13	Lucien Mettomo
MF	7	Modeste M'bami
MF	8	Geremi
MF	17	Marc-Vivien Foé	(yellow card) 23'	(substituted off) 75'
MF	19	Eric Djemba-Djemba	(yellow card) 77'
FW	11	Pius N'Diefi		(substituted off) 74'
FW	18	Mohammadou Idrissou		(substituted off) 90'
Substitutions:
DF	5	Timothée Atouba		(substituted on) 74'
MF	16	Valéry Mézague		(substituted on) 75'
MF	20	Nana Falemi		(substituted on) 90'
Manager:
(Germany) Winfried Schäfer

GK	1	Óscar Córdoba	(yellow card) 55'
DF	2	Iván Córdoba	(yellow card) 49'
DF	3	Mario Yepes
DF	23	Gonzalo Martínez
MF	8	Arnulfo Valentierra
MF	10	Giovanni Hernández
MF	15	Rubén Darío Velázquez		(substituted off) 46'
MF	18	Jorge López Caballero
MF	20	Gerardo Bedoya		(substituted off) 70'
MF	21	Jairo Patiño
FW	9	Víctor Aristizábal
Substitutions:
FW	7	Elson Becerra		(substituted on) 46'
MF	11	Elkin Murillo		(substituted on) 70'
Manager:
Francisco Maturana

=== France v Turkey ===
26 June 2003
21:00 CEST

France	3–2	Turkey
Henry 11'; Pires 26'; Wiltord 43'	Report	Gökdeniz 42'; Tuncay 48'

Stade de France, Saint-Denis
Attendance: 41,195
Referee: Jorge Larrionda (Uruguay)

France	Turkey

GK	23	Grégory Coupet
DF	5	William Gallas
DF	8	Marcel Desailly
DF	13	Mikaël Silvestre	(yellow card) 44'
DF	15	Lilian Thuram
MF	6	Olivier Dacourt
MF	7	Robert Pires		(substituted off) 70'
MF	18	Benoît Pedretti	(yellow card) 6'
FW	11	Sylvain Wiltord		(substituted off) 78'
FW	12	Thierry Henry
FW	22	Sidney Govou		(substituted off) 66'
Substitutions:
FW	9	Djibril Cissé		(substituted on) 66'
MF	17	Olivier Kapo	(yellow card) 75'	(substituted on) 70'
MF	10	Ludovic Giuly	(yellow card) 82'	(substituted on) 78'
Manager:
Jacques Santini

GK	1	Rüştü Reçber		(substituted off) 36'
DF	3	Bülent Korkmaz	(yellow card) 75'
DF	4	Fatih Akyel	(yellow card) 35'
DF	5	Alpay Özalan
DF	6	Ergün Penbe
MF	10	Yıldıray Baştürk		(substituted off) 81'
MF	15	İbrahim Üzülmez
MF	20	Selçuk Şahin		(substituted off) 85'
MF	22	Gökdeniz Karadeniz
FW	9	Tuncay Şanlı
FW	16	Okan Yılmaz
Substitutions:
GK	12	Ömer Çatkıç		(substituted on) 36'
FW	19	Necati Ateş		(substituted on) 81'
MF	8	Volkan Arslan		(substituted on) 85'
Manager:
Şenol Güneş

== Third-place match ==
28 June 2003
18:00 CEST

Colombia	1–2	Turkey
Hernández 63'	Report	Tuncay 2'; Okan Y. 86'

Stade Geoffroy-Guichard, Saint-Étienne
Attendance: 18,237
Referee: Mark Shield (Australia)

Colombia	Turkey

GK	1	Óscar Córdoba
DF	2	Iván Córdoba
DF	3	Mario Yepes
DF	23	Gonzalo Martínez	(yellow card) 33'
MF	10	Giovanni Hernández
MF	15	Rubén Darío Velázquez
MF	18	Jorge López Caballero		(substituted off) 28'
MF	20	Gerardo Bedoya
MF	21	Jairo Patiño
FW	7	Elson Becerra		(substituted off) 41'
FW	9	Víctor Aristizábal
Substitutions:
MF	8	Arnulfo Valentierra		(substituted on) 28'
FW	16	Eudalio Arriaga		(substituted on) 41'
Manager:
Francisco Maturana

GK	12	Ömer Çatkıç	(yellow card) 89'
DF	2	Fatih Sonkaya		(substituted off) 60'
DF	14	Deniz Barış
DF	15	İbrahim Üzülmez	(yellow card) 33'
DF	17	Servet Çetin	(yellow card) 20'
MF	7	Serkan Balcı
MF	8	Volkan Arslan		(substituted off) 87'
MF	21	İbrahim Toraman
MF	22	Gökdeniz Karadeniz
FW	9	Tuncay Şanlı	(yellow card) 57'
FW	19	Necati Ateş		(substituted off) 66'
Substitutions:
MF	20	Selçuk Şahin		(substituted on) 60'
FW	16	Okan Yılmaz		(substituted on) 66'
DF	6	Ergün Penbe		(substituted on) 87'
Manager:
Şenol Güneş

== Final ==
29 June 2003
21:00 (UTC+2)

Cameroon	0–1 (a.e.t./g.g.)	France
	Report	Henry 97'

Stade de France, Saint-Denis
Attendance: 51,985
Referee: Valentin Ivanov (Russia)

Cameroon	France

GK	1	Carlos Kameni
CB	3	Jean-Joël Perrier-Doumbé
CB	13	Lucien Mettomo
CB	4	Rigobert Song (c)
RM	8	Geremi
CM	19	Eric Djemba-Djemba
CM	7	Modeste M'bami	(yellow card) 89'
LM	5	Timothée Atouba
RF	16	Valéry Mézague		(substituted off) 91'
CF	11	Pius N'Diefi		(substituted off) 67'
LF	18	Mohammadou Idrissou
Substitutions:
FW	9	Samuel Eto'o		(substituted on) 67'
MF	10	Achille Emaná		(substituted on) 91'
Manager:
(Germany) Winfried Schäfer

GK	16	Fabien Barthez
RB	19	Willy Sagnol		(substituted off) 76'
CB	5	William Gallas
CB	8	Marcel Desailly (c)
LB	3	Bixente Lizarazu
RM	10	Ludovic Giuly
CM	18	Benoît Pedretti
CM	6	Olivier Dacourt	(yellow card) 44'	(substituted off) 90'
LM	11	Sylvain Wiltord		(substituted off) 65'
CF	9	Djibril Cissé
CF	12	Thierry Henry
Substitutions:
MF	7	Robert Pires		(substituted on) 65'
DF	15	Lilian Thuram		(substituted on) 76'
MF	17	Olivier Kapo		(substituted on) 90'
Manager:
Jacques Santini
