= 2003 FIFA Confederations Cup Group A =

Football tournament group stage

Group A of the 2003 FIFA Confederations Cup took place between 18 and 22 June 2003. Hosts France won the group and advanced to the knockout stage, along with group runners-up Colombia. Japan and New Zealand failed to advance.

== Standings ==
Team	Pld	W	D	L	GF	GA	GD	Pts
France	3	3	0	0	8	1	+7	9
Colombia	3	2	0	1	4	2	+2	6
Japan	3	1	0	2	4	3	+1	3
New Zealand	3	0	0	3	1	11	−10	0

== Results ==
=== New Zealand v Japan ===
18 June 2003
18:00 CEST

New Zealand	0–3	Japan
	Report	Nakamura 12', 75'; Nakata 65'

Stade de France, Saint-Denis
Attendance: 36,038
Referee: Coffi Codjia (Benin)

New Zealand	Japan

GK	12	Michael Utting
DF	2	Duncan Oughton	(yellow card) 72'
DF	4	Chris Zoricich
DF	14	Ryan Nelsen
DF	20	Gerard Davis
MF	7	Ivan Vicelich
MF	8	Aaran Lines		(substituted off) 70'
MF	9	Mark Burton		(substituted off) 73'
MF	19	Simon Elliott
FW	11	Chris Killen		(substituted off) 80'
FW	16	Vaughan Coveny
Substitutions:
MF	21	Noah Hickey		(substituted on) 70'
MF	10	Chris Jackson		(substituted on) 73'
DF	13	Christian Bouckenooghe		(substituted on) 80'
Manager:
(England) Mick Waitt

GK	1	Seigo Narazaki
DF	14	Alessandro Santos	(yellow card) 6'
DF	17	Tsuneyasu Miyamoto
DF	21	Keisuke Tsuboi
DF	22	Nobuhisa Yamada
MF	5	Junichi Inamoto	(yellow card) 37'
MF	7	Hidetoshi Nakata
MF	10	Shunsuke Nakamura
MF	19	Yasuhito Endō
FW	9	Yoshito Ōkubo
FW	20	Naohiro Takahara
Manager:
(Brazil) Zico

=== France v Colombia ===
18 June 2003
21:00 CEST

France	1–0	Colombia
Henry 39' (pen.)	Report

Stade de Gerland, Lyon
Attendance: 38,541
Referee: Lucílio Batista (Portugal)

France	Colombia

GK	23	Grégory Coupet
DF	2	Philippe Mexès	(yellow card) 10'
DF	3	Bixente Lizarazu	(yellow card) 90+3'
DF	8	Marcel Desailly
DF	15	Lilian Thuram	(yellow card) 90+4'
MF	6	Olivier Dacourt
MF	17	Olivier Kapo		(substituted off) 61'
MF	18	Benoît Pedretti
FW	9	Djibril Cissé		(substituted off) 77'
FW	11	Sylvain Wiltord
FW	12	Thierry Henry	(yellow card) 24'	(substituted off) 85'
Substitutions:
MF	7	Robert Pires		(substituted on) 61'
FW	22	Sidney Govou		(substituted on) 77'
FW	20	Steve Marlet		(substituted on) 85'
Manager:
Jacques Santini

GK	1	Óscar Córdoba
DF	2	Iván Córdoba	(yellow card) 89'
DF	3	Mario Yepes
DF	23	Gonzalo Martínez		(substituted off) 90+3'
MF	10	Giovanni Hernández
MF	15	Rubén Darío Velázquez	(yellow card) 38'
MF	18	Jorge López Caballero	(yellow card) 6'
MF	20	Gerardo Bedoya
MF	21	Jairo Patiño		(substituted off) 66'
FW	7	Elson Becerra	(yellow card) 78'
FW	9	Víctor Aristizábal	(yellow card) 90+4'
Substitutions:
FW	16	Eudalio Arriaga		(substituted on) 66'
DF	6	Gerardo Vallejo		(substituted on) 90+3'
Manager:
Francisco Maturana

=== Colombia v New Zealand ===
20 June 2003
19:00 CEST

Colombia	3–1	New Zealand
López 58'; Yepes 75'; Hernández 85'	Report	De Gregorio 27'

Stade de Gerland, Lyon
Attendance: 22,811
Referee: Carlos Batres (Guatemala)

Colombia	New Zealand

GK	1	Óscar Córdoba
DF	2	Iván Córdoba	(yellow card) 60'
DF	3	Mario Yepes
DF	23	Gonzalo Martínez	(yellow card) 16'
MF	10	Giovanni Hernández
MF	11	Elkin Murillo		(substituted off) 46'
MF	15	Rubén Darío Velázquez		(substituted off) 8'
MF	18	Jorge López Caballero
MF	20	Gerardo Bedoya		(substituted off) 77'
FW	7	Elson Becerra	(yellow card) 40'
FW	9	Víctor Aristizábal
Substitutions:
MF	21	Jairo Patiño		(substituted on) 8'
MF	8	Arnulfo Valentierra		(substituted on) 46'
FW	16	Eudalio Arriaga		(substituted on) 77'
Manager:
Francisco Maturana

GK	12	Michael Utting	(yellow card) 66'
DF	2	Duncan Oughton
DF	5	Danny Hay
DF	14	Ryan Nelsen	(yellow card) 38'
DF	20	Gerard Davis
MF	7	Ivan Vicelich
MF	17	Raf de Gregorio
MF	19	Simon Elliott
MF	21	Noah Hickey	(yellow card) 33'
FW	11	Chris Killen	(yellow card) 60' (yellow-red card) 68'
FW	16	Vaughan Coveny		(substituted off) 83'
Substitutions:
FW	15	Shane Smeltz		(substituted on) 83'
Manager:
(England) Mick Waitt

=== France v Japan ===
20 June 2003
21:00 CEST

France	2–1	Japan
Pires 43' (pen.); Govou 65'	Report	Nakamura 59'

Stade Geoffroy-Guichard, Saint-Étienne
Attendance: 33,070
Referee: Mark Shield (Australia)

France	Japan

GK	16	Fabien Barthez
DF	4	Jean-Alain Boumsong
DF	5	William Gallas
DF	13	Mikaël Silvestre
DF	19	Willy Sagnol	(red card) 90'
MF	6	Olivier Dacourt		(substituted off) 57'
MF	7	Robert Pires
MF	14	Jérôme Rothen		(substituted off) 66'
MF	21	Ousmane Dabo
FW	20	Steve Marlet		(substituted off) 80'
FW	22	Sidney Govou	(yellow card) 21'
Substitutions:
MF	18	Benoît Pedretti		(substituted on) 57'
FW	11	Sylvain Wiltord		(substituted on) 66'
FW	12	Thierry Henry		(substituted on) 80'
Manager:
Jacques Santini

GK	1	Seigo Narazaki
DF	14	Alessandro Santos
DF	17	Tsuneyasu Miyamoto
DF	21	Keisuke Tsuboi
DF	22	Nobuhisa Yamada
MF	5	Junichi Inamoto	(yellow card) 42'	(substituted off) 73'
MF	7	Hidetoshi Nakata
MF	10	Shunsuke Nakamura		(substituted off) 80'
MF	19	Yasuhito Endō
FW	9	Yoshito Ōkubo	(yellow card) 33'
FW	20	Naohiro Takahara
Substitutions:
MF	16	Kōji Nakata		(substituted on) 73'
MF	8	Mitsuo Ogasawara		(substituted on) 80'
Manager:
(Brazil) Zico

=== France v New Zealand ===
22 June 2003
21:00 CEST

France	5–0	New Zealand
Kapo 17'; Henry 20'; Cissé 71'; Giuly 90+1'; Pires 90+3'	Report

Stade de France, Saint-Denis
Attendance: 36,842
Referee: Masoud Moradi (Iran)

France	New Zealand

GK	1	Mickaël Landreau
DF	2	Philippe Mexès
DF	3	Bixente Lizarazu
DF	8	Marcel Desailly
DF	15	Lilian Thuram
MF	10	Ludovic Giuly
MF	17	Olivier Kapo
MF	18	Benoît Pedretti	(substituted off) 68'
FW	9	Djibril Cissé
FW	11	Sylvain Wiltord	(substituted off) 76'
FW	12	Thierry Henry	(substituted off) 74'
Substitutions:
MF	21	Ousmane Dabo	(substituted on) 68'
FW	20	Steve Marlet	(substituted on) 74'
MF	7	Robert Pires	(substituted on) 76'
Manager:
Jacques Santini

GK	12	Michael Utting
DF	4	Chris Zoricich	(substituted off) 73'
DF	5	Danny Hay	(substituted off) 81'
DF	13	Christian Bouckenooghe
DF	14	Ryan Nelsen
DF	20	Gerard Davis
MF	9	Mark Burton	(substituted off) 68'
MF	17	Raf de Gregorio
MF	19	Simon Elliott
MF	21	Noah Hickey
FW	16	Vaughan Coveny
Substitutions:
MF	10	Chris Jackson	(substituted on) 68'
DF	2	Duncan Oughton	(substituted on) 73'
DF	18	Scott Smith	(substituted on) 81'
Manager:
(England) Mick Waitt

=== Japan v Colombia ===
22 June 2003
21:00 CEST

Japan	0–1	Colombia
	Report	Hernández 68'

Stade Geoffroy-Guichard, Saint-Étienne
Attendance: 24,541
Referee: Jorge Larrionda (Uruguay)

Japan	Colombia

GK	1	Seigo Narazaki
DF	14	Alessandro Santos
DF	17	Tsuneyasu Miyamoto
DF	21	Keisuke Tsuboi
DF	22	Nobuhisa Yamada	(yellow card) 11'
MF	7	Hidetoshi Nakata	(yellow card) 82'
MF	8	Mitsuo Ogasawara		(substituted off) 74'
MF	16	Kōji Nakata
MF	19	Yasuhito Endō		(substituted off) 82'
FW	9	Yoshito Ōkubo		(substituted off) 67'
FW	20	Naohiro Takahara
Substitutions:
MF	18	Yuichiro Nagai		(substituted on) 67'
MF	11	Daisuke Matsui	(yellow card) 87'	(substituted on) 74'
MF	13	Daisuke Oku		(substituted on) 82'
Manager:
(Brazil) Zico

GK	1	Óscar Córdoba
DF	3	Mario Yepes
DF	5	José Mera	(yellow card) 5'
DF	23	Gonzalo Martínez
MF	10	Giovanni Hernández
MF	14	Óscar Díaz		(substituted off) 46'
MF	18	Jorge López Caballero
MF	20	Gerardo Bedoya
MF	21	Jairo Patiño
FW	9	Víctor Aristizábal
FW	16	Eudalio Arriaga		(substituted off) 76'
Substitutions:
MF	8	Arnulfo Valentierra		(substituted on) 46'
DF	6	Gerardo Vallejo		(substituted on) 76'
Manager:
Francisco Maturana
