= 2003 FIFA Confederations Cup final =

- Event: 2003 FIFA Confederations Cup
Cameroon	France
(Cameroon)	(France)
0	1
- After golden goal extra-time
- Date: 29 June 2003
- Venue: Stade de France, Saint-Denis
- Referee: Valentin Ivanov (Russia)
- Attendance: 51,985

The 2003 FIFA Confederations Cup final was a football match to determine the winners of the 2003 FIFA Confederations Cup. The match was held at Stade de France, Saint-Denis, France, on 29 June 2003 and was contested by Cameroon and France. France won the match 1–0, with a golden goal in the 97th minute from Thierry Henry when he kneed the ball past Carlos Kameni into the left corner of the net from the right of the six yard box after a pass from Lilian Thuram.

Cameroon wore shirts embroidered with Marc-Vivien Foé's name and dates of birth and death as a tribute to their midfielder who had suffered cardiac arrest and died on the pitch during their semi-final game against Colombia three days earlier. At the trophy presentation, two Cameroon players held a large photo of Foé, on which FIFA officials hung a runner-up medal. When France captain Marcel Desailly was presented with the trophy, he held it in unison with Cameroon captain Rigobert Song.

== Route to the final ==
Cameroon
Round
France
Opponent
Result
Group stage
Opponent
Result
Brazil
1–0
Match 1
Colombia
1–0
Turkey
1–0
Match 2
Japan
2–1
United States
0–0
Match 3
New Zealand
5–0

Team	Pld	W	D	L	GF	GA	GD	Pts
Cameroon	3	2	1	0	2	0	2	7
Turkey	3	1	1	1	4	4	0	4
Brazil	3	1	1	1	3	3	0	4
United States	3	0	1	2	1	3	−2	1

Final standing

Team	Pld	W	D	L	GF	GA	GD	Pts
France	3	3	0	0	8	1	7	9
Colombia	3	2	0	1	4	2	2	6
Japan	3	1	0	2	4	3	1	3
New Zealand	3	0	0	3	1	11	−10	0

Opponent
Result
Knockout stage
Opponent
Result
Colombia
1–0
Semi-final
Turkey
3–2

== Match details ==
29 June 2003
21:00 (UTC+2)

Cameroon	0–1 (a.e.t./g.g.)	France
	Report	Henry 97'

Stade de France, Saint-Denis
Attendance: 51,985
Referee: Valentin Ivanov (Russia)

Cameroon	France

GK	1	Carlos Kameni
CB	3	Jean-Joël Perrier-Doumbé
CB	13	Lucien Mettomo
CB	4	Rigobert Song (c)
RM	8	Geremi
CM	19	Eric Djemba-Djemba
CM	7	Modeste M'bami	(yellow card) 89'
LM	5	Timothée Atouba
RF	16	Valéry Mézague		(substituted off) 91'
CF	11	Pius Ndiefi		(substituted off) 67'
LF	18	Mohammadou Idrissou
Substitutions:
FW	9	Samuel Eto'o		(substituted on) 67'
MF	10	Achille Emaná		(substituted on) 91'
Manager:
(Germany) Winfried Schäfer

GK	16	Fabien Barthez
RB	19	Willy Sagnol		(substituted off) 76'
CB	5	William Gallas
CB	8	Marcel Desailly (c)
LB	3	Bixente Lizarazu
RM	10	Ludovic Giuly
CM	18	Benoît Pedretti
CM	6	Olivier Dacourt	(yellow card) 44'	(substituted off) 90'
LM	11	Sylvain Wiltord		(substituted off) 65'
CF	9	Djibril Cissé
CF	12	Thierry Henry
Substitutions:
MF	7	Robert Pires		(substituted on) 65'
DF	15	Lilian Thuram		(substituted on) 76'
MF	17	Olivier Kapo		(substituted on) 90'
Manager:
(France) Jacques Santini

Assistant referees:
Gennady Krasyuk (Russia)
Yuri Dupanov (Belarus)

Fourth official:
Carlos Amarilla (Paraguay)
