= Mick Waitt =

New Zealand football manager

Personal information
- Full name: Michael Hugh Waitt
- Date of birth: 25 June 1960 (age 66)
- Place of birth: Hexham, England
- Position: Striker

Senior career*
Years	Team	Apps	(Gls)
- Calverton Rangers
- Arnold Kingswell
- Keyworth United
1984–1987	Notts County	88	(32)
1987–1990	Lincoln City FC	26	(10)
1990–1991	Ilkeston Town		

Managerial career
- 1992–?: Napier City Rovers
- 2002–2004: New Zealand
Medal record
Men's football
Representing New Zealand (as manager)
OFC Nations Cup
Winner	2002
- * Club domestic league appearances and goals

Michael Hugh Waitt (born 25 June 1960) is an English football player and coach, who managed the New Zealand national football team. Waitt played in the Football League for Notts County and Lincoln City FC. He took charge of the New Zealand national side June 2002. New Zealand won eleven, drew two and lost ten of his 23 games in charge. He now works for Lemon-Squeezy and was formerly part of Quokkas, now an honorable Quokka.

== Playing career ==
=== New Zealand ===
In 1990, while playing in Hong Kong for Lai Sun, Waitt visited his sister in Wellington. Whilst in New Zealand he was contacted by his erstwhile manager Keith Buckley who was coaching Napier City Rovers. Buckley invited Waitt to play for the club and he did so, spending the 1990 season with the club, scoring 8 goals in 14 National Soccer League appearances. He returned to the UK, joining Spalding United in December 1990, Nuneaton Borough in January 1991 and Grantham two months later. He moved on to join Gedling Town and then Ilkeston Town before emigrating permanently to New Zealand in January 1992.

He departed the New Zealand post following the expiry of his contract.

New Zealand Results under Mick Waitt 2002–2004
#	Date	Venue	Opponent	Result	Goalscorers	Competition
2002
1	5 July	North Harbour Stadium, Auckland	Tahiti	4–0	Nelsen	2002 OFC Nations Cup
1	5 July	North Harbour Stadium, Auckland	Tahiti	4–0	Vicelich	2002 OFC Nations Cup
1	5 July	North Harbour Stadium, Auckland	Tahiti	4–0	Urlovic	2002 OFC Nations Cup
1	5 July	North Harbour Stadium, Auckland	Tahiti	4–0	Campbell	2002 OFC Nations Cup
2	7 July	North Harbour Stadium, Auckland	Papua New Guinea	9–1	Killen (4)	2002 OFC Nations Cup
2	7 July	North Harbour Stadium, Auckland	Papua New Guinea	9–1	Campbell (2)	2002 OFC Nations Cup
2	7 July	North Harbour Stadium, Auckland	Papua New Guinea	9–1	Nelsen	2002 OFC Nations Cup
2	7 July	North Harbour Stadium, Auckland	Papua New Guinea	9–1	Burton	2002 OFC Nations Cup
2	7 July	North Harbour Stadium, Auckland	Papua New Guinea	9–1	de Gregorio	2002 OFC Nations Cup
3	9 July	North Harbour Stadium, Auckland	Solomon Islands	6–1	Vicelich (2)	2002 OFC Nations Cup
3	9 July	North Harbour Stadium, Auckland	Solomon Islands	6–1	Urlovic	2002 OFC Nations Cup
3	9 July	North Harbour Stadium, Auckland	Solomon Islands	6–1	Campbell (2)	2002 OFC Nations Cup
3	9 July	North Harbour Stadium, Auckland	Solomon Islands	6–1	Burton	2002 OFC Nations Cup
4	12 July	Mount Smart Stadium, Auckland	Vanuatu	3–0	Burton (2)	2002 OFC Nations Cup
4	12 July	Mount Smart Stadium, Auckland	Vanuatu	3–0	Killen	2002 OFC Nations Cup
5	14 July	Mount Smart Stadium, Auckland	Australia	1–0	Nelsen	2002 OFC Nations Cup Final
6	13 October	A. Le Coq Arena, Tallinn	Estonia	2–3	Hickey	Friendly
6	13 October	A. Le Coq Arena, Tallinn	Estonia	2–3	Lines	Friendly
7	16 October	KSZO, Ostrowiec Świętokrzyski	Poland	0–2		Friendly
2003
8	27 May	Tynecastle Stadium, Edinburgh	Scotland	1–1	Nelsen	Friendly
9	8 June	City Stadium, Richmond	United States	1–2	Coveny	Friendly
10	18 June	Stade de France, Paris	Japan	0–3		2003 FIFA Confederations Cup
11	20 June	Stade de Gerland, Lyon	Colombia	1–3	de Gregorio	2003 FIFA Confederations Cup
12	22 June	Stade de France, Paris	France	0–5		2003 FIFA Confederations Cup
13	12 October	Azadi Stadium, Tehran	Iran	0–3		AFC – OFC Challenge Cup
2004
14	29 May	Hindmarsh Stadium, Adelaide	Australia	0–1		2004 OFC Nations Cup; 2006 FIFA World Cup qualification
15	31 May	Marden Sports Complex, Adelaide	Solomon Islands	3–0	Fisher	2004 OFC Nations Cup; 2006 FIFA World Cup qualification
15	31 May	Marden Sports Complex, Adelaide	Solomon Islands	3–0	Oughton	2004 OFC Nations Cup; 2006 FIFA World Cup qualification
15	31 May	Marden Sports Complex, Adelaide	Solomon Islands	3–0	Lines	2004 OFC Nations Cup; 2006 FIFA World Cup qualification
16	2 June	Hindmarsh Stadium, Adelaide	Vanuatu	2–4	Coveny (2)	2004 OFC Nations Cup; 2006 FIFA World Cup qualification
17	4 June	Marden Sports Complex, Adelaide	Tahiti	10–0	Coveny (3)	2004 OFC Nations Cup; 2006 FIFA World Cup qualification
17	4 June	Marden Sports Complex, Adelaide	Tahiti	10–0	Fisher (3)	2004 OFC Nations Cup; 2006 FIFA World Cup qualification
17	4 June	Marden Sports Complex, Adelaide	Tahiti	10–0	Jones	2004 OFC Nations Cup; 2006 FIFA World Cup qualification
17	4 June	Marden Sports Complex, Adelaide	Tahiti	10–0	Oughton	2004 OFC Nations Cup; 2006 FIFA World Cup qualification
17	4 June	Marden Sports Complex, Adelaide	Tahiti	10–0	Nelsen (2)	2004 OFC Nations Cup; 2006 FIFA World Cup qualification
18	6 June	Hindmarsh Stadium, Adelaide	Fiji	2–0	Bunce	2004 OFC Nations Cup; 2006 FIFA World Cup qualification
18	6 June	Hindmarsh Stadium, Adelaide	Fiji	2–0	Coveny	2004 OFC Nations Cup; 2006 FIFA World Cup qualification
