= André-Joël Eboué =

Cameroonian footballer

Personal information
- Full name: André-Joël Eboué
- Date of birth: 25 June 1974 (age 52)
- Place of birth: Yaoundé, Cameroon
- Height: 1.89 m (6 ft 2 in)
- Position: Goalkeeper

Youth career
- 1989–1990: Caïman Douala
- 1990–1992: Canon Yaoundé

Senior career*
Years	Team	Apps	(Gls)
1992–1994	Olympic Mvolyé		
1994	La Louvière		
1995–1997	Tonnerre Yaoundé	61	(0)
1997–1998	Sevilla B	0	(0)
1999–2000	O Elvas		
2000–2001	Freamunde	11	(0)
2001–2002	Varese	1	(0)
2002–2003	Stade Beaucairois	12	(0)
2003–2004	Blanc-Mesnil		
2005–2008	Villemomble Sports	46	(0)
2008–2009	Orly		
- * Club domestic league appearances and goals

André-Joël Eboué (born 25 June 1974) is a Cameroonian retired footballer who played as a goalkeeper.

== Club career ==
Born in Yaoundé, Eboué's 17-year senior career was spent mainly in lower league football, his first team being Olympic Mvolyé, and he also represented in his country Tonnerre Yaoundé. Abroad, he represented R.A.A. Louviéroise (Belgium, no games), Sevilla Atlético (Spain), O Elvas CAD, S.C. Freamunde (both in Portugal), A.S. Varese 1910 (Italy), Stade Beaucairois, Blanc-Mesnil SFB, Villemomble Sports and AS Orly (all in France).

Eboué's only professional spell occurred in the 2000–01 season, when he backed up Spaniard Rufino Lekué at Freamunde and the club ranked last in the second division. In May 2002, whilst with Varese, he was attacked by a group of 30 hooligans, being inflicted minor injuries.

== International career ==
Eboué represented the Cameroonian under-20 team at the 1993 FIFA World Youth Championship. He was selected by the full side for the 2003 FIFA Confederations Cup, but eventually did not win one single cap.
