= Pius N'Diefi =

Cameroonian footballer, coach, and sporting director (born 1975)

Personal information
- Full name: Pius Sielenu N'Diefi
- Date of birth: 5 July 1975 (age 51)
- Place of birth: Kumba, Cameroon
- Height: 1.63 m (5 ft 4 in)
- Position: Striker

Team information
- Current team: Saint-Quentin (Player, forward coach & sporting director)

Senior career*
| Years | Team | Apps | (Gls) |
| 1992 | PWD Bamenda | | |
| 1993–1995 | Lens | 1 | (0) |
| 1995–1996 | ASOA Valence | 37 | (9) |
| 1996–2003 | Sedan | 187 | (48) |
| 2004–2005 | Al-Gharafa | 3 | (1) |
| 2005–2006 | Germinal Beerschot | 6 | (0) |
| 2006–2007 | Paris FC | 59 | (18) |
| 2007–2008 | Stella Club | | |
| 2008–2010 | JS Saint-Pierroise | | |
| 2011–2012 | AS Frenoy-St Quentin | | |

International career
| 2000–2005 | Cameroon | 34 | (4) |

Managerial career
- 2011–2012: AS Frenoy-St Quentin (forward coach)
- 2012–: Saint-Quentin (forward coach)
- 2016–: Saint-Quentin (sporting director)
Medal record
Representing Cameroon
Africa Cup of Nations
| Winner | 2000 Ghana-Nigeria |
| Winner | 2002 Mali |
FIFA Confederations Cup
| Runner-up | 2003 France |
- * Club domestic league appearances and goals

Pius Sielenu N'Diefi (born 5 July 1975) is a Cameroonian former professional footballer who played as a striker. He later worked as a forward coach and sporting director at Saint-Quentin.

== Club career ==
N'Diefi learned of the death of his father the day before Germinal Beerschot was to play the second leg of the 2005–06 UEFA Cup against Olympique de Marseille. He was nevertheless part of the starting eleven for that match.

== International career ==
N'Diefi was part of the Cameroon national team for the 2002 FIFA World Cup and the 2004 African Cup of Nations, as well as at the victorious 2000 and 2002 African Cup of Nations. He scored the winner in the infamous 2003 FIFA Confederations Cup semi-final between Cameroon and Colombia, where teammate Marc-Vivien Foé died on the pitch. In the final, Cameroon were defeated 1–0 by hosts France.

== Career statistics ==
=== International goals ===
Scores and results list Cameroon's goal tally first, score column indicates score after each N'Diefi goal.

List of international goals scored by Pius N'Diefi
| No. | Date | Venue | Opponent | Score | Result | Competition |
|---|---|---|---|---|---|---|
| 1 | 11 January 2000 | Stade du 4 Août, Ouagadougou, Burkina Faso | Burkina Faso | 1–0 | 2–2 | Friendly |
| 2 | 11 January 2000 | Stade du 4 Août, Ouagadougou, Burkina Faso | Burkina Faso | 2–2 | 2–2 | Friendly |
| 3 | 14 July 2001 | Independence Stadium, Lusaka, Zambia | Zambia | 2–1 | 2–2 | 2002 FIFA World Cup qualification |
| 4 | 26 June 2003 | Stade de Gerland, Lyon, France | Colombia | 1–0 | 1–0 | 2003 FIFA Confederations Cup |

== Honours ==
Cameroon

- African Cup of Nations: 2000, 2002
- FIFA Confederations Cup: runner up, 2003
