= Eric Kwekeu =

Cameroonian footballer

Personal information
- Date of birth: 11 March 1980 (age 46)
- Place of birth: Yaoundé, Cameroon
- Height: 1.83 m (6 ft 0 in)
- Position: Goalkeeper

Senior career*
Years	Team	Apps	(Gls)
2003–2005	Bamboutos FC	22	(0)
2006–2008	Union Douala	20	(0)
2008–2011	Mangasport	12	(0)
2011–2016	Sapins		

International career
2003	Cameroon	1	(0)
- * Club domestic league appearances and goals

Eric Kwekeu (born 11 March 1980) is a Cameroonian former professional footballer who played as a goalkeeper.

== International career ==
He was member of the national team at 2003 FIFA Confederations Cup; he played one match against United States at the tournament. In is his only cap with the senior national team.
