= Volkan Arslan =

Turkish footballer and coach

Personal information
- Full name: Volkan Arslan
- Date of birth: 29 August 1978 (age 48)
- Place of birth: Hanover, West Germany
- Height: 1.83 m (6 ft 0 in)

Team information
- Current team: Adana Demirspor

Youth career
- 1988–1996: Hannover 96

Senior career*
Years	Team	Apps	(Gls)
1995–1999	Hannover 96	36	(3)
1999–2000	Rot-Weiss Essen	35	(4)
2000–2002	Adanaspor	62	(11)
2002–2003	Kocaelispor	16	(1)
2003–2006	Galatasaray	57	(6)
2006–2007	Ankaraspor	25	(1)
2007–2008	Gaziantepspor	25	(0)
2008–2009	Antalyaspor	10	(0)
2009–2010	Ankaragücü	4	(0)
2010–2011	Orduspor	15	(1)
2011	Eyüpspor	8	(0)
2011–2012	Bozüyükspor	3	(0)
Total		296	(27)

International career
1995	Turkey U-16	4	(1)
1996	Turkey U-17	0	(0)
1996	Turkey U-18	5	(0)
2006	Turkey A2	2	(0)
2003–2006	Turkey	11	(0)

Managerial career
- 2014–2017: Kasımpaşa (youth)
- 2017: Çaykur Rizespor (assistant)
- 2018: Alanyaspor (assistant)
- 2019: Sarıyer (assistant)
- 2020: Adana Demirspor (assistant)
- 2020–2021: Bayrampaşa
- 2021: İstanbulspor (assistant)
- * Club domestic league appearances and goals

Volkan Arslan (born 29 August 1978) is a Turkish football coach and former player. Arslan played for Turkey at the U-16, U-17 and U-18 levels before he made his debut for the senior team in 2003.

== Club career ==
Arslan began his career with local club Hannover 96. After making 36 league appearances for the club, Arslan was transferred to Rot-Weiss Essen. Adanaspor brought Arslan to the club in 2000. He joined Kocaelispor in 2002, spending six months with the club before moving to Galatasaray on 31 January 2003. After leaving Galatsaray, Arslan played for Ankaraspor, Gaziantepspor, Antalyaspor and MKE Ankaragücü.

On 19 August 2011, he signed for Bozüyükspor.

== International career ==
Arslan has made eleven appearances for the Turkey national football team, including participating at the 2003 FIFA Confederations Cup. He also represented Turkey at the U-16 to U-18 levels, as well as making two appearances for the senior reserve team in 2006.

== Honours ==
Turkey

- FIFA Confederations Cup third place: 2003
