= Okan Yılmaz =

Turkish footballer

Personal information
- Date of birth: 16 May 1978 (age 48)
- Place of birth: Bursa, Turkey
- Height: 1.78 m (5 ft 10 in)
- Position: Striker

Youth career
- 1988–1996: İnegölspor

Senior career*
Years	Team	Apps	(Gls)
1996–1998	İnegölspor	41	(15)
1998–2005	Bursaspor	212	(115)
2005	Malatyaspor	16	(4)
2006	Konyaspor	14	(4)
2006	Sakaryaspor	11	(1)
2007	Diyarbakirspor	9	(0)
2008	Orduspor	5	(1)
2008	Panthrakikos	3	(0)
2009	Vanspor	10	(3)
2009–2010	Tepecikspor	9	(1)
2010	Alanyaspor	1	(0)
2012	Altınova Belediyespor	7	(2)
Total		337	(134)

International career
1998–2002	Turkey U21	34	(38)
2003–2004	Turkey	8	(5)
Medal record
Men's Football
Representing Turkey
FIFA Confederations Cup
Third place	2003 France
- * Club domestic league appearances and goals

Okan Yılmaz (born 16 May 1978) is a Turkish retired professional footballer who played as a forward.

== Early life and club career ==
Yılmaz started playing football for Karayollari Yolspor in 1988. His professional career began in İnegölspor when he was signed up in 1996. Two years later, in 1998, he was transferred to Bursaspor. Yılmaz spent the brunt of his career at the Bursa-based club, leading the Süper Lig in goals scored twice (2001 and 2003). He was courted by CSKA Moscow and Marseille in 2003. A transfer fee from l'OM was accepted by Bursaspor, but Yılmaz did not agree to the contracts terms.

== International career ==
Yılmaz started his international career with the Turkey U-21 squad in 2000. He was promoted to the senior squad in 2003, but has not been called up since 2004. He has five goals in eight caps, as well as a third-place finish in the 2003 FIFA Confederations Cup. In the semi-final v France, Yilmaz had the opportunity to equalise with a penalty, but missed, and consequently, Turkey lost 3–2, and went to the third place playoff.

== Career statistics ==
=== Club ===
Appearances and goals by club, season and competition
Club	Season	League		Cup		Total	
Club	Season	Apps	Goals	Apps	Goals	Apps	Goals
İnegölspor	1996–97	25	13	2	9	27	22
İnegölspor	1997–98	16	2	0	18	16	20
İnegölspor	Total	41	15	2	1	43	16
Bursaspor	1998	4	0	0	0	4	0
Bursaspor	1998–99	23	2	0	0	23	2
Bursaspor	1999–2000	25	13	4	2	29	15
Bursaspor	2000–01	31	23	0	0	31	23
Bursaspor	2001–02	32	14	1	1	33	15
Bursaspor	2002–03	34	24	1	1	35	25
Bursaspor	2003–04	34	14	2	0	36	14
Bursaspor	2004–05	29	25	2	1	31	26
Bursaspor	Total	212	115	10	5	222	120
Malatyaspor	2005–06	16	4	3	0	19	4
Konyaspor	2006	14	4	1	0	15	4
Sakaryaspor	2006–07	11	1	1	0	12	1
Diyarbakirspor	2007–08	9	0	0	0	9	0
Orduspor	2008	5	1	0	0	5	1
Panthrakikos	2008–09	3	0	0	0	3	0
Vanspor	2009	10	3	0	0	10	3
Tepecikspor	2009–10	9	1	0	0	9	1
Career total		330	144	17	6	347	150

=== International ===
Appearances and goals by national team and year
National team	Year	Apps	Goals
Turkey	2003	8	5
Total		8	5

(Correct as of 15 May 2010)

Okan Yılmaz: International goals
No.	Date	Venue	Opponent	Score	Result	Competition
1	2003-06-19	Stade Geoffroy-Guichard, France	United States	1–1	2-1	2003 FIFA Confederations Cup
2	2003-06-23	Stade Geoffroy-Guichard, France	Brazil	2-1	2-2	2003 FIFA Confederations Cup
3	2003-06-28	Stade Geoffroy-Guichard, France	Colombia	2–1	2-1	2003 FIFA Confederations Cup
4	2003-08-20	Ankara 19 Mayıs Stadium, Turkey	Moldova	2–0	2–0	Friendly
5	2003-09-09	Lansdowne Road, Republic of Ireland	Republic of Ireland	2–1	2-2	Friendly

== Honours ==
Turkey

- FIFA Confederations Cup 2003 third place: 2003

Individual

- Süper Lig top goalscorer: 2001, 2003
- TFF First League top goalscorer: 2005
