= Ömer Çatkıç =

Turkish footballer (born 1974)

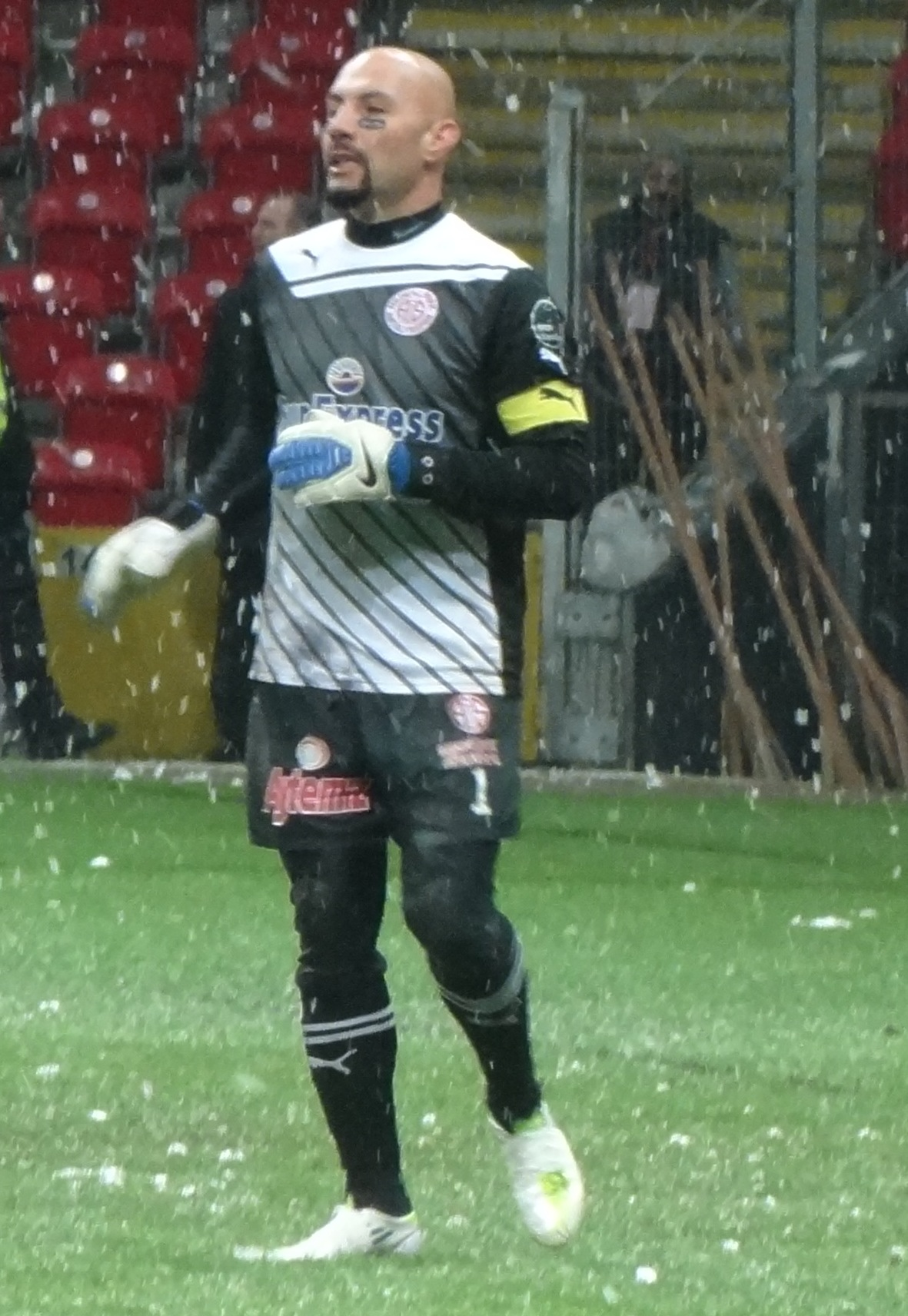
- Çatkıç with Antalyaspor in 2012

Personal information
- Date of birth: 15 October 1974 (age 52)
- Place of birth: Eskişehir, Turkey
- Height: 1.88 m (6 ft 2 in)
- Position: Goalkeeper

Senior career*
Years	Team	Apps	(Gls)
1992–1998	Eskişehirspor	107	(1)
1998–2004	Gaziantepspor	192	(0)
2004–2006	Gençlerbirliği	50	(0)
2006–2007	Bursaspor	27	(0)
2007–2008	Gaziantepspor	19	(0)
2008–2012	Antalyaspor	112	(0)
Total		507	(0)

International career
1999–2005	Turkey	19	(0)
Medal record
Representing Turkey
Men's football
FIFA World Cup
Third place	2002 Korea/Japan
- * Club domestic league appearances and goals

Ömer Çatkıç (born 15 October 1974) is a Turkish former professional footballer who played as a goalkeeper. His last club was Antalyaspor in the Turkish Süper Lig.

He played for Eskişehirspor, Gaziantepspor, Gençlerbirliği, and Bursaspor. He returned to Gaziantepspor in the 2007–08 season.

He played for the Turkey national team and was a participant at the Euro 2000, 2002 FIFA World Cup and 2003 FIFA Confederations Cup.

== Prosecution ==
In the aftermath of the attempted coup d'etat of July 2016 he was accused of being involved in the Gülen movement. In January 2020 Çatkiç was sentenced to two years and three months imprisonment for being a member of an armed terror organization due to his links to the Gülen movement. He was charged with using the ByLock app to communicate with members of the Gulen movement.

== Honours ==
Turkey

- FIFA World Cup: third place 2002
- FIFA Confederations Cup: third place 2003

Order

- Turkish State Medal of Distinguished Service
