= Stade Geoffroy-Guichard =

Stadium in Saint-Étienne, France

- Le Chaudron
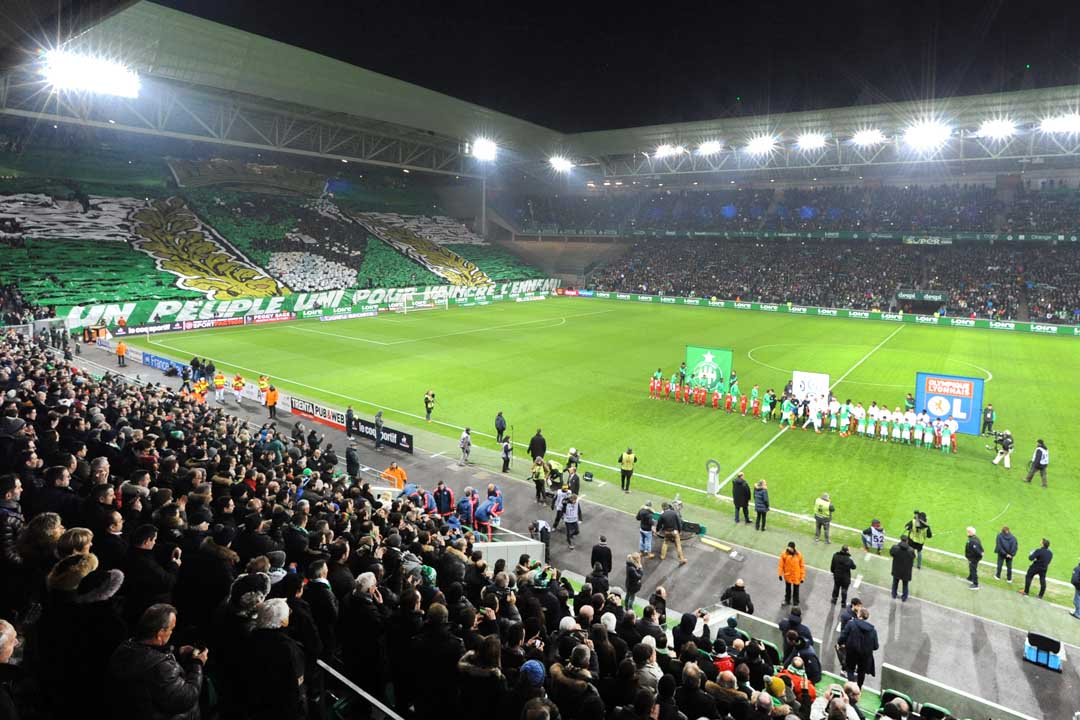
- Interactive map of Stade Geoffroy-Guichard
- Full name: Stade Geoffroy-Guichard
- Location: 14 rue Paul-et-Pierre-Guichard, Saint-Étienne, Loire, France
- Coordinates: 45°27′39″N 4°23′25″E
- Capacity: 41,965
- Surface: AirFibr (hybrid grass)

Construction
- Built: 1930
- Opened: 13 September 1931
- Renovated: 1983–1984, 1996–1998, 2011–2014

Tenant
- AS Saint-Étienne (1930–present)

Stade Geoffroy-Guichard (French pronunciation: [stad ʒɔfʁwa ɡiʃaʁ]) is a multi-purpose stadium in Saint-Étienne, France. It is used primarily for football matches, and tournaments such as the UEFA Euro 1984 and 2016, the 1998 FIFA World Cup and the 2003 FIFA Confederations Cup. It is also used for rugby union, and was a venue at the 2007 Rugby World Cup. It is nicknamed "le Chaudron" (the Cauldron), or "l'enfer vert" (the Green Hell), an allusion to the colours worn by the local football team, AS Saint-Étienne, given during the team's heyday when it drew particularly large crowds (the record being set in 1985, with more than 47,000 spectators). More recently, its current capacity was 35,616 before the current renovations, which began in 2011, and temporarily reduced this figure to 26,747. Since the renovations finished, the stadium holds 42,000 seated spectators (42 being the number of the Loire department where Saint-Étienne is located).

The stadium opened on 13 September 1931, and AS Saint-Étienne's first match there took place on 17 September against FAC Nice. The stadium was named after Geoffroy Guichard, founder of the Casino retail group, who purchased the site on which it was built.

== Description ==
The stadium holds 35,616 people. It is built in the "English style" (à l'anglaise), meaning that there are no corner stands. The four stands are named:

- Charles Paret: 8,541 seats
- Jean Snella: 8,767 seats
- Pierre Faurand: 7,993 seats, including 18 boxes, and 1,200 VIP seats
- Henri Point: 10,315 seats, including 1,200 for visiting fans

The stadium has been renovated at several points during its history. The biggest renovations came in 1984 (for the European Football Championships), and in 1998 (for the World Cup). The stadium's capacity over time has been as follows:

- 1,800 (1931)
- 5,000 (1935)
- 15,000 (1938)
- 25,000 (1957)
- 39,570 (1968)
- 48,274 (including 22,200 seated) (1984)
- 35,616 (all seated) (1998)
- 42,000 (2015)

== History ==
- The stadium in Saint-Étienne is named after the founder of the Casino stores, headquartered in Saint-Étienne. Geoffroy Guichard was also owner of the land bought from the family "In Rochetaillée" on the site Estivalière on which the stadium was built.
- The construction of the stadium began in 1930 through the contribution of Saint-Étienne, responding to a subscription launched by Pierre Guichard, son of Geoffrey. The plans for the original stadium were devised by architects Étienne Thierry Meyer and Michael Saidoun. The stadium consisted of a field surrounded by a 400m running track and a 1,000 seat stand. Underneath the stand were the changing rooms, showers and offices. The total stadium capacity then was about 1,800 people.
- The stadium was opened on 13 September 1931 ( "large" defeat against AS Cannes semi-finalist of the Cup of France: the score was 1–9). ASSE played the first professional match against FAC Nice on 17 September 1933. The first professional match in Saint-Étienne resulted in a 3–2 victory. ASSE won all of this season's 8 games played at home.
- In 1936, ASSE built a second stand, which became known as the forum Henri Point. Behind each goal, earth embankments were constructed to create a standing section. The stadium capacity rose to 15,000 spectators.
- In 1956, the athletics track was removed. The supporters were now closer to the pitch: more like an "English" football stadium.
- 1957: a year later, the stands (seated) were restructured to allow "standing". The stadium capacity rose to 30,000 spectators. The ASSE won its first French championship title.
- 1965: floodlights were installed: four towers, 60 meters in height. They would remain until the World Cup.
- 17 September 1968: The city purchased the stadium: the north–south bleachers were covered, the main grandstand was rebuilt: its appearance would remain unchanged until changes in 1997 in preparation for hosting games in the World Cup. Soon, the ASSE would meet Glasgow Celtic in the European Cup. "The Greens" won 2–0 (but lost 0–4 in the second leg). The stadium now contained 40,000 seats.
- 1972: Under the influence of Roger Rocher, the club invested in an office building and sports facilities under the platform of the Tower. This achievement was inspired by the infrastructure of other great European clubs. The new dressing rooms under the Henri Point stand were completed and still exist today.
- 1977: Construction of ground covered annex.
- Substantial work took place in 1983 to host Euro 1984. Fifteen thousand seats were added and the roof was rebuilt, using plexiglass. Two matches were held at Geoffroy-Guichard (including the stadium's first international match), including a legendary game between France and Yugoslavia where Michel Platini scored a hat-trick.
- 18 October 1994: Saint-Étienne was officially chosen by the COF to host 6 games during the 1998 World Cup. The Stade Geoffroy-Guichard would undergo major work to meet FIFA standards, at a cost of 100 million francs, with 60 million more for facilities outside the stadium. Work began in May 1996. The dressing rooms and locker rooms of the Pierre Faurand stand were renovated, and disabled access was installed. The old floodlight towers were dismantled and new floodlights were installed on each of the four stands. The Faurand Pierre stand, which had not undergone any change for Euro 1984, gained 3,000 balcony seats. The towers disappeared from this stand, with the roof instead held by four metal poles resting on the back of the rostrum. The Kop-style terraces disappeared, replaced by steps and seats. Safety nets and fences were replaced and many cameras installed to monitor the entire stadium. The pitch was completely re-laid. A plan involving the closure of turnstiles was dismissed. The renovated stadium was opened on 12 May 1998, just one month before the opening World Cup match between Brazil and Scotland in Saint-Denis.
- Small changes occurred in 2007: The stadium was chosen to host three matches of the 2007 Rugby World Cup. In these circumstances, two giant screens were installed in two corners of the open stand, and the screens were retained after the competition.
- Since summer 2007, the roof of the stadium has been on a 20-year lease to a company that installed 2 600 m^{2} of solar panels. (This is one of the most important industries in France, where photovoltaic sensors annually produce 206 996 kWh.) Under normal circumstances, assuming there is a domestic use of electricity, the stadium's panels can produce electricity for 60 houses each year. (But taking into account the use of industries and electric utilities, it actually refers to the average electricity consumed annually by 40 people). The plant was used for the communication of EDF in early 2009 with an advertisement broadcast on major French television channels showing Saint-Étienne fans visiting the stadium by electric tram and an aerial view of the stadium.
- The outdoor lighting is provided today by 192 projectors, in the four stands.
- In 2009, co-chairmen of the club, Roland Romeyer and Bernard Caiazzo suggested the possibility of building a new stadium for home games of the ASSE, citing in particular the sometimes insufficient capacity of Geoffroy-Guichard. A project was proposed on a greenfield site of fifteen acres, located north of the Museum of Modern Art. This provoked strong opposition from the four main supporters' groups of ASSE. Finally, in late June 2009, the municipality decided in favour of renovating the stadium: the work would begin in 2011 and would enclose the four stands. The stadium capacity will increase to 41,000 seats. The VIP areas and a panoramic restaurant will also be created.

=== 1984 UEFA European Championship ===
The stadium was one of the venues of the UEFA Euro 1984, and held the following matches:

Date	Time (CET)	Team #1	Result	Team #2	Round	Attendance
14 June 1984	20:30	Romania	1–1	Spain	Group B	16,972
19 June 1984	20:30	France	3–2	Yugoslavia	Group A	47,589

=== 1998 FIFA World Cup ===
The stadium was one of the venues of the 1998 FIFA World Cup, and held the following matches:

Date	Time (CET)	Team #1	Result	Team #2	Round	Attendance
14 June 1998	17:30	FR Yugoslavia	1–0	Iran	Group F	36,000
17 June 1998	17:30	Chile	1–1	Austria	Group B	36,000
19 June 1998	21:00	Spain	0–0	Paraguay	Group D	36,000
23 June 1998	21:00	Scotland	0–3	Morocco	Group A	36,000
25 June 1998	16:00	Netherlands	2–2	Mexico	Group E	36,000
30 June 1998	21:00	Argentina	2–2 (4–3 p)	England	Round of 16	36,000

=== 2003 FIFA Confederations Cup ===
The stadium was one of the venues of the 2003 FIFA Confederations Cup, and held the following matches:

Date	Team #1	Result	Team #2	Round	Attendance
19 June 2003	Turkey	2–1	United States	Group B	16,944
20 June 2003	France	2–1	Japan	Group A	33,070
22 June 2003	Japan	0–1	Colombia	Group A	24,541
23 June 2003	Brazil	2–2	Turkey	Group B	29,170
28 June 2003	Colombia	1–2	Turkey	Third place play-off	18,237

=== UEFA Euro 2016 ===
The stadium was one of the venues of the UEFA Euro 2016, and held the following matches:

Date	Time (CET)	Team #1	Result	Team #2	Round	Attendance
14 June 2016	21:00	Portugal	1–1	Iceland	Group F	38,742
17 June 2016	18:00	Czech Republic	2–2	Croatia	Group D	38,376
20 June 2016	21:00	Slovakia	0–0	England	Group B	39,051
25 June 2016	15:00	Switzerland	1–1 (4–5 p)	Poland	Round of 16	38,842

=== 2023 Rugby World Cup ===
The stadium was one of the venues of the 2023 Rugby World Cup:

Date	Time (CET)	Team #1	Result	Team #2	Round	Attendance
9 September 2023	13:00	Italy	52–8	Namibia	Pool A	35,515
17 September 2023	17:45	Australia	15–22	Fiji	Pool C	41,294
22 September 2023	17:45	Argentina	19–10	Samoa	Pool D	38,358
1 October 2023	17:45	Australia	34–14	Portugal	Pool C	41,965

=== 2024 Summer Olympics (Football) ===
Date	Team #1	Result	Team #2	Round	Attendance
24 July 2024	Argentina	1–2	Morocco	Men's group B	26,717
25 July 2024	Canada	2–1	New Zealand	Women's group A	2,674
27 July 2024	Ukraine	2–1	Morocco	Men's group B	28,655
28 July 2024	France	1–2	Canada	Women's group A	17,550
30 July 2024	United States	3–0	Guinea	Men's group A	6,245
31 July 2024	Zambia	1–4	Germany	Women's group B	2,642
