= Scott Smith (footballer, born 1975) =

New Zealand footballer

Personal information
- Full name: Scott Smith
- Date of birth: 6 March 1975 (age 51)
- Place of birth: Christchurch, New Zealand
- Position: Defender

Senior career*
Years	Team	Apps	(Gls)
1993–1997	Rotherham United	36	(0)
1997	Kettering Town	6	(0)
1997–2003	Woking	186	(1)
2003–2004	Kingstonian	44	(0)
2004–2006	Basingstoke Town	41	(0)
2005	→ Kingstonian (loan)	4	(0)
2006	Kingstonian	5	(0)
2006–2007	Bisley Sports	21	(1)

International career
1998–2003	New Zealand	28	(0)
- * Club domestic league appearances and goals

Scott David Smith (born 6 March 1975 in Christchurch) is a New Zealand former football (soccer) defender.

He has played for the New Zealand national football team, the All Whites, making his debut in 1998 against Chile and collecting his 28th and final cap (no goals scored) in official FIFA matches against France in the Confederations Cup 2003.

Smith began the 2006-07 campaign back at Isthmian League side Kingstonian, but was released and went on to play for Bisley Sports in the Hellenic League.
