= Gerardo Vallejo =

Colombian footballer (born 1976)

Gerardo Enrique Vallejo (born 12 March 1976 in Medellín) is a Colombian former footballer who played as a defender with Itagüí S.A.

He previously played for Envigado and Deportivo Cali.

He was capped by the Colombia national team and played against France and Japan in the 2003 FIFA Confederations Cup.
