= Michael Utting =

New Zealand footballer (born 1970)

Personal information
- Full name: Michael Glenn Utting
- Date of birth: 26 May 1970 (age 56)
- Place of birth: Wellington, New Zealand
- Height: 1.82 m (5 ft 11 1/2 in)
- Position: Goalkeeper

Team information
- Current team: Levin AFC

Youth career
- Rongotai College
- Onslow Wellington

Senior career*
Years	Team	Apps	(Gls)
1992	Miramar Rangers		
1993	Sunshine George Cross		
1993–1994	South Melbourne FC		
1994–1996	Miramar Rangers		
1997–1999	Wits	15	(0)
1999–2000	Football Kingz	14	(0)
2000–2002	Supersport United	62	(0)
2002–2004	Football Kingz	34	(0)
2004–2005	Waikato FC		
2005–2006	YoungHeart Manawatu		
2006–2007	Waitakere United	16	(0)
2007–2008	YoungHeart Manawatu	9	(0)

International career^{‡}
1993–2003	New Zealand	14	(0)
- * Club domestic league appearances and goals as of 16 April 2008 ‡ National team caps and goals as of 16 April 2008

Michael Glenn Utting (born 26 May 1970, in Wellington) is a former New Zealand football player who played as a goalkeeper.

== Early years ==
Utting grew up in Ngaio, Wellington, the youngest of four children. His father is a civil engineer, his mother a nurse; they separated when he was 10. He went to Ngaio School and then Nelson College from 1984 to 1986. He played cricket and volleyball, but football was always his number one passion. By the time he reached the final year of high school, Utting was keeping for both the Nelson College first-XI and national league side Miramar Rangers.

== Club career ==
A much-travelled player, Utting served clubs in his native New Zealand, as well as in Australia and South Africa.

During his New Zealand years, he also played for winter clubs Gisborne City AFC and Waitakere City FC.

== International career ==
Utting has played for the New Zealand national football team, the All Whites. Since making his debut for the All Whites in 1991, he had rarely been a substitute goalkeeper, until 1999, when his career was marred by alcoholism.

He was included in the New Zealand side for the 1999 Confederations Cup finals tournament in Mexico where he was an unused substitute. He fared better in 2003 as he was recalled for the 2003 Confederations Cup finals tournament in France, playing in all three group games before New Zealand were eliminated.

== One for the Road – Utting's alcoholism ==
He had been into trouble with alcoholism, and his problem became public in 1999. He was axed in 1999, and again in 2002 after a botched initial attempt to quit the booze (a problem he had since 1992). He was recalled again in 2003, but by then, he had taken up a contract to play in Brunei.
