= Fatih Sonkaya =

Turkish footballer

- Born: July 1, 1981 (age 45); Oltu, Turkey
- Height: 1.80 m (5 ft 11 in)
- Children: Nisa Sonkaya

Fatih Sonkaya
Personal information
- Position: Right back

Youth career
- SV Heerlerhei
- Swift Roermond
- Heerlen
- Roda

Senior career*
Years	Team	Apps	(Gls)
1998–2004	Roda	93	(1)
1999–2000	→ VVV (loan)	8	(1)
2004–2005	Beşiktaş	10	(0)
2005–2008	Porto	5	(0)
2005–2006	Porto B	4	(0)
2006–2007	→ Académica (loan)	4	(0)
2007–2008	→ Roda (loan)	16	(0)
2009	Khazar	11	(0)
2010	Erciyesspor	14	(0)
Total		165	(2)

International career
2003–2004	Turkey	6	(0)
- * Club domestic league appearances and goals

Fatih Sonkaya (born 1 July 1981) is a Turkish retired footballer who played as a right back.

He also held Dutch nationality, due to the many years spent in that country.

== Club career ==
Although born in Oltu, Eastern Anatolia region, Sonkaya spent most of his youth in Heerlen, Netherlands where he, together with older brother Özcan, started playing soccer at RKSV Heerlen. He started his professional career at Roda JC in 1998 and, after six seasons (three as first-choice), with a loan to VVV-Venlo in between, transferred to Beşiktaş J.K. in his homeland.

For 2005–06, Sonkaya signed for Portuguese club FC Porto, and collected the Primeira Liga winner's medal, albeit playing sparingly. The following campaign he was loaned to Académica de Coimbra also in the country, appearing in just four top division games.

After another loan, now back in the Netherlands with Roda, Sonkaya was released in June 2008 and joined Bursaspor. However, midway through the season, he moved to Azerbaijan's FK Khazar Lankaran.

In February 2010, Sonkaya returned to his country, signing with Kayseri Erciyesspor in the second level.

== International career ==
A Turkish international since 2003, Sonkaya gained six caps, and appeared twice in the 2003 FIFA Confederations Cup as the national team finished third (two 2–1 wins).

== Honours ==
=== Club ===
Porto

- Primeira Liga: 2005–06
- Taça de Portugal: 2005–06

=== Country ===
- FIFA Confederations Cup: Third place 2003
