= Gonzalo Martínez =

Colombian footballer (born 1975)

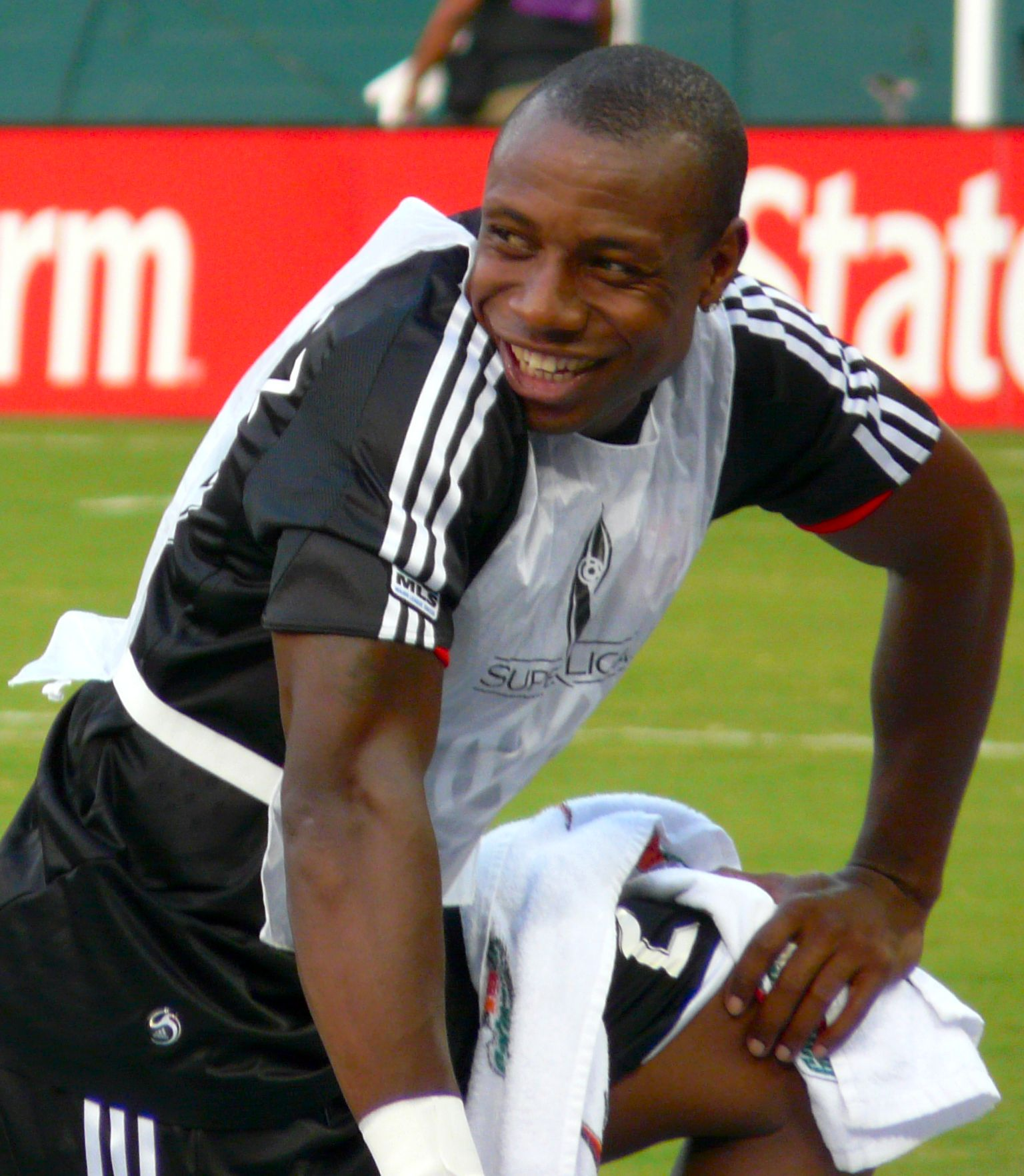
- Martinez warming up before a match between D.C. United and Houston Dynamo in 2008

Personal information
- Full name: Gonzalo Martínez Caicedo
- Date of birth: 30 November 1975 (age 50)
- Place of birth: Candelaria, Valle del Cauca, Colombia
- Height: 1.78 m (5 ft 10 in)
- Position: Defender

Senior career*
Years	Team	Apps	(Gls)
1998–2001	Deportes Tolima		
2001–2003	Udinese	24	(0)
2003	→ Napoli (loan)	20	(0)
2003–2004	Reggina	14	(0)
2004	→ Napoli (loan)	12	(0)
2005	Deportes Tolima	21	(3)
2006	Olimpia	18	(0)
2006	Libertad	27	(0)
2007	Millonarios	36	(0)
2008	D.C. United	26	(1)
2009–2010	Atlético Huila	74	(12)
2011	Deportivo Cali	29	(2)
2012	Real Cartagena	15	(2)
2012–2015	Patriotas	19	(1)

International career
2001–2006	Colombia	36	(1)

Managerial career
- 2016: Patriotas (assistant)
- 2017: Atlético Bucaramanga (assistant)
- 2017–2019: Unión Magdalena (assistant)
- 2019–2023: Independiente Santa Fe (assistant)
- 2024: Yaracuyanos
- * Club domestic league appearances and goals

Gonzalo Martinez Caicedo (born 30 November 1975) is a Colombian football manager and former player who played as a defender.

== Club career ==
Martínez was born in Candelaria, Valle del Cauca. He started his professional career in the Colombian First Division with Deportes Tolima in 1998 before moving to Italian Serie A side Udinese in 2001. Martinez made 24 appearances for Udinese from 2001 to 2003 before joining Napoli on loan, where he spent part of the 2002–03 campaign. Half of the registration rights was also signed by A.C. Venezia in January 2003 by exchanged with Rubén Maldonado. In the 2003–04 season, he moved to Reggina with Andrea Sottil and David Di Michele, where he made 14 appearances.

The Colombian defender returned to his native Colombia and rejoined Deportes Tolima for the 2005 season, notching three goals in 21 appearances. Martìnez then moved to Olimpia, and later, Paraguayan side Libertad, during the 2005–06 season, where he started in a combined 27 games and helped Libertad capture the Paraguayan First Division championship. In 2007, Martìnez returned to Colombia and appeared in 36 games for Millonarios.

In early 2008, he moved to D.C. United, where he started initially at center back, then left back, before falling out of favor with the coaching staff. After 1 goal and 2 assists in 22 starts with United, Martinez returned to Colombia to play for Atlético Huila.

== International career ==
Martinez has represented Colombia 36 times at the international level. He participated in the qualifiers for the 2002 FIFA World Cup in Korea and Japan, and also the qualifiers for the 2006 FIFA World Cup in Germany. He also represented his country at the 2003 FIFA Confederations Cup and 2004 Copa América.

== Honors ==
=== D.C. United ===
- Lamar Hunt U.S. Open Cup (1): 2008
