= Elson Becerra =

Colombian footballer (1978-2006)

Personal information
- Full name: Elson Evelio Becerra Vaca
- Date of birth: 26 April 1978
- Place of birth: Cartagena de Indias, Colombia
- Date of death: 8 January 2006 (aged 27)
- Place of death: Cartagena de Indias, Colombia
- Height: 1.68 m (5 ft 6 in)
- Positions: Winger; deep-lying striker

Senior career*
Years	Team	Apps	(Gls)
1995–2001	Deportes Tolima		(64)
2001–2003	Atletico Junior		
2003	América de Cali		
2003–2006	Al Jazira		
2004–2005	→ Emirates (loan)		

International career
2000–2003	Colombia	14	(1)
- * Club domestic league appearances and goals

Elson Evelio Becerra Vaca (26 April 1978 – 8 January 2006) was a Colombian footballer.

== Club career ==
Born in Cartagena, Becerra began playing football with Deportes Tolima's youth academy. He joined the senior squad at age 17, helping the club gain promotion to the Colombian second division. He scored 64 goals for Tolima.

On club level the striker had played for Al Jazira in the United Arab Emirates since 2003. He played for Emirates Club during the 2005 season. He previously played for Deportes Tolima and Atlético Junior.

== International career ==
A national team player, Becerra won the 2001 Copa America and participated in the 2003 Confederations Cup, where he became noted for trying to save the life of the collapsed Marc-Vivien Foé. He also featured in Colombia's unsuccessful qualification for the 2006 FIFA World Cup.

== Death ==
Becerra was shot in a night club in his birth town Cartagena together with his friend Alexander Ríos, apparently after they had a fight with a group of men a couple of days earlier. He was 27 years old.

== See also ==
- List of unsolved murders (2000–present)
