= Arnulfo Valentierra =

Colombian footballer (born 1974)

Personal information
- Full name: Arnulfo Valentierra Cuero
- Date of birth: 16 August 1974 (age 52)
- Place of birth: Barranquilla, Colombia
- Height: 1.78 m (5 ft 10 in)
- Position: Midfielder

Senior career*
Years	Team	Apps	(Gls)
1995–2002	Once Caldas	178	(50)
2002	América de Cali	20	(2)
2003	Once Caldas	42	(18)
2003	Al-Wahda (UAE)		
2004	Al-Ittihad (UAE)		
2005	Cienciano	13	(3)
2005–2007	Once Caldas	72	(19)
2007	Peñarol	7	(1)
2008	Bolívar	39	(14)
2009	Unión Magdalena	10	(3)
2010	Aurora	32	(6)
2011	Once Caldas	15	(1)

International career
1999–2004	Colombia	11	(1)
- * Club domestic league appearances and goals

Arnulfo Valentierra Cuero (born 16 August 1974) is a retired Colombian footballer.

== Club career ==
Valentierra began his professional career with Once Caldas. In 2002, he was loaned to popular club América de Cali, but he remained with the diablos rojos only for six months, and moved back to Once Caldas prior to the start of the 2003 season. Then he relocated to the UAE where he played for local clubs Al-Wahda and Al-Ittihad in 2003. In 2004 he returned to Colombia's side Once Caldas and was a key piece in the team's Copa Libertadores championship in 2004. Upon his return to South America in 2005, he signed for Peruvian team Cienciano del Cuzco before joining Once Caldas for the third time around. He also had spells with Peñarol in the Primera División Uruguaya, and later with club Bolívar of the Liga de Fútbol Profesional Boliviano.

== International career ==
Valentierra has made 11 appearances for the senior Colombia national team, including four matches at the 2003 FIFA Confederations Cup.
