= Mohamadou Idrissou =

Cameroonian footballer (born 1980)

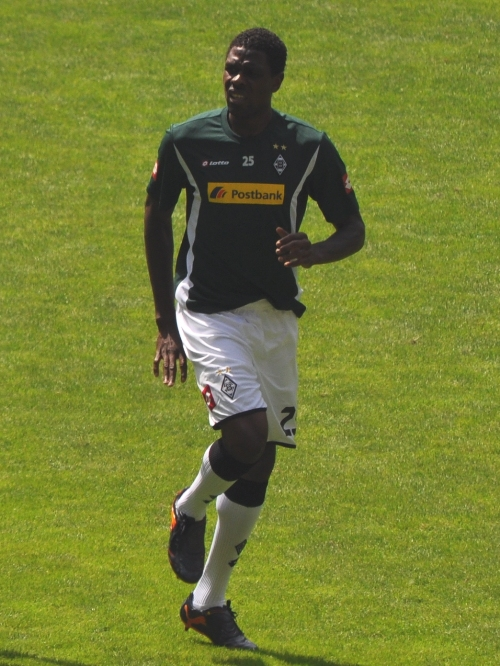
- Idrissou playing for Borussia Mönchengladbach in 2010

Personal information
- Date of birth: 8 March 1980 (age 46)
- Place of birth: Yaoundé, Cameroon
- Height: 1.90 m (6 ft 3 in)
- Position: Striker

Senior career*
| Years | Team | Apps | (Gls) |
| | Racing FC Bafoussam | 20 | (5) |
| 1999–2000 | Cotonsport Garoua | 24 | (7) |
| 2000–2001 | FSV Frankfurt | 18 | (15) |
| 2001–2002 | SV Wehen | 31 | (13) |
| 2002–2006 | Hannover 96 | 60 | (13) |
| 2006–2007 | MSV Duisburg | 45 | (8) |
| 2008–2010 | SC Freiburg | 74 | (25) |
| 2010–2011 | Borussia Mönchengladbach | 33 | (5) |
| 2011–2012 | Eintracht Frankfurt | 26 | (14) |
| 2012–2014 | 1. FC Kaiserslautern | 61 | (30) |
| 2014 | Maccabi Haifa | 5 | (0) |
| 2015 | Shkëndija | 5 | (0) |
| 2015–2017 | KFC Uerdingen 05 | 22 | (9) |
| 2018 | Union Hallein | 11 | (2) |
| 2018–2019 | FC Kufstein | 26 | (15) |
| 2019 | DSV Leoben | 19 | (12) |
| 2020 | Rot-Weiss Frankfurt | 1 | (0) |
| 2020–2021 | Viktoria Griesheim | 5 | (1) |
| Total | | 486 | (174) |

International career
| 2003–2014 | Cameroon | 39 | (6) |

Managerial career
- 2021: SG VfR/Dersim Rüsselsheim
- 2024: SC Blau Weiß Neu-Isenburg
Medal record
Men's football
Representing Cameroon
Africa Cup of Nations
| Runner-up | 2008 Ghana |
- * Club domestic league appearances and goals

Mohamadou Idrissou (born 8 March 1980) is a Cameroonian former professional footballer who played as a striker.

== Club career ==
On the last day of the summer transfer window 2011, Idrissou moved to 2. Bundesliga club Eintracht Frankfurt.

Having contributed 14 goals to Eintracht Frankfurt's return to the Bundesliga in 2011–12, Idrissou unexpectedly signed for 2. Bundesliga team 1. FC Kaiserslautern on 27 July 2012.

On 21 May 2014, he signed with Israeli side Maccabi Haifa. He was waived by the team on 13 November 2014. In the following winter-break he moved to the Republic of Macedonia where he signed with FK Shkëndija.

In 2015 he moved back to Germany to KFC Uerdingen 05.

After two years he moved to Union Hallein.

During the summer transfer period 2018 he moved to Austria to FC Kufstein.

In October 2020, Idrissou signed for Viktoria Griesheim in the fifth-tier Hessenliga. He retired from football at the end of the 2022–21 season.

== International career ==
Idrissou was part of the Cameroon national team at the 2004 African Nations Cup, which finished top of its group in the first round of competition, before failing to secure qualification for the semi-finals. He also played for Cameroon at the 2003 FIFA Confederations Cup and 1999 FIFA World Youth Championship.

== Coaching career ==
A few weeks after his retirement, on 27 July 2021, Idrissou was appointed manager of SG VfR/Dersim Rüsselsheim on a trial basis for four weeks. However, already after three weeks, he left the club again.

In October 2024, Idrissou was appointed manager of newly founded club, SC Blau Weiß Neu-Isenburg, that was competing in the lowest German football Division, Kreisliga C, the German eight tier.

== Career statistics ==
=== International ===
Appearances and goals by national team and year
| National team | Year | Apps | Goals |
|---|---|---|---|
| Cameroon | 2003 | 6 | 0 |
| Cameroon | 2004 | 6 | 0 |
| Cameroon | 2006 | 1 | 2 |
| Cameroon | 2007 | 5 | 2 |
| Cameroon | 2008 | 5 | 0 |
| Cameroon | 2010 | 11 | 2 |
| Cameroon | 2012 | 1 | 0 |
| Cameroon | 2013 | 1 | 0 |
| Cameroon | 2014 | 3 | 0 |
| Total | | 39 | 6 |

Scores and results list Cameroon's goal tally first, score column indicates score after each Idrissou goal.

List of international goals scored by Mohamadou Idrissou
| No. | Date | Venue | Opponent | Score | Result | Competition | Ref. |
|---|---|---|---|---|---|---|---|
| 1 | 7 October 2006 | Ahmadou Ahidjo Stadium, Yaoundé, Cameroon | Equatorial Guinea | 1–0 | 3–0 | 2008 Africa Cup of Nations qualification | |
| 2 | 7 October 2006 | Ahmadou Ahidjo Stadium, Yaoundé, Cameroon | Equatorial Guinea | 3–0 | 3–0 | 2008 Africa Cup of Nations qualification | |
| 3 | 24 March 2007 | Ahmadou Ahidjo Stadium, Yaoundé, Cameroon | Liberia | 3–1 | 3–1 | 2008 Africa Cup of Nations qualification | |
| 4 | 17 June 2007 | Roumdé Adjia Stadium, Garoua, Cameroon | Rwanda | 1–0 | 2–1 | 2008 Africa Cup of Nations qualification | |
| 5 | 9 January 2010 | Kasarani Stadium, Nairobi, Kenya | Kenya | 3–1 | 3–1 | Friendly | |
| 6 | 17 January 2010 | Estádio Nacional da Tundavala, Lubango, Angola | Zambia | 3–2 | 3–2 | 2010 Africa Cup of Nations | |

== Honors ==
SC Freiburg

- 2. Bundesliga: 2008–09

Cameroon

- Africa Cup of Nations: runner-up 2008
