= Valéry Mézague =

Cameroonian footballer (1983–2014)

Personal information
- Date of birth: 8 December 1983
- Place of birth: Marseille, France
- Date of death: 15 November 2014 (aged 30)
- Place of death: Toulon, France
- Height: 1.83 m (6 ft 0 in)
- Position: Midfielder

Senior career*
| Years | Team | Apps | (Gls) |
| 1999–2006 | Montpellier | 57 | (10) |
| 2004–2005 | → Portsmouth (loan) | 11 | (0) |
| 2005–2009 | Sochaux | 34 | (0) |
| 2007–2008 | → Le Havre (loan) | 28 | (3) |
| 2009 | Châteauroux | 16 | (2) |
| 2009–2011 | Vannes | 46 | (5) |
| 2011–2012 | Panetolikos | 3 | (0) |
| 2013 | Bury | 7 | (0) |
| 2014 | Toulon | 3 | (0) |
| Total | | 205 | (20) |

International career
| 2003–2004 | Cameroon | 7 | (0) |
- * Club domestic league appearances and goals

Valéry Mézague (8 December 1983 – 15 November 2014) was a Cameroonian professional footballer who played as a midfielder.

Mézague was born in the 5th arrondissement of Marseille in 1983, to a Cameroonian mother. He acquired French nationality on 16 September 1997, through the collective effect of his mother's naturalization.

He represented Cameroon at international level. His most notable moment with the Lions Indomptables was at the 2003 FIFA Confederations Cup, where he became the starter central midfielder in the lost final against host France, after replacing the late Marc-Vivien Foé during the victorious semi final versus Colombia.

In 2003, he was involved in a serious car crash which ruled him out of the game for four months. Despite this, he fought back to reclaim his form and his performances attracted the attention of Harry Redknapp, with Mézague joining Portsmouth F.C. on loan for the 2004–05 season. However, he failed to make any sort of substantial impression and returned to France in June 2005, where he followed his former manager at Portsmouth Alain Perrin to FC Sochaux-Montbéliard.

His younger brother, Teddy, is also a footballer.

He was found dead in his apartment on 15 November 2014, due to a cardiac arrest caused by a heart disease.
