= Jorge López (footballer, born 1981) =

Colombian footballer

Jorge López Caballero
Personal information
- Full name: Jorge López Caballero
- Date of birth: 15 August 1981 (age 45)
- Place of birth: Cali, Colombia
- Height: 5 ft 10 in (1.78 m)
- Position: Midfielder

Senior career*
Years	Team	Apps	(Gls)
1999–2002	Deportivo Cali	87	(2)
2003–2004	Millonarios	49	(7)
2004–2006	Deportivo Cali	23	(1)
2005	→ Deportivo Pereira (loan)	36	(2)
2007	Boyacá Chicó	41	(1)
2008	Maccabi Netanya	9	(0)
2009–2011	Yaracuyanos	17	(1)

International career
2003	Colombia	8	(1)
- * Club domestic league appearances and goals

Jorge López Caballero (born 15 August 1981) is a Colombian footballer.

He played for the Colombia national team in the 2003 FIFA Confederations Cup and the qualifiers for the 2006 FIFA World Cup.

== Career statistics ==
Appearances and goals by national team and year
National team	Year	Apps	Goals
Colombia	2003	8	1
Total		8	1

Scores and results list Colombia's goal tally first, score column indicates score after each López goal.

List of international goals scored by Jorge López
No.	Date	Venue	Opponent	Score	Result	Competition	Ref.
1	20 June 2003	Stade de Gerland, Lyon, France	New Zealand	1–1	3–1	2003 FIFA Confederations Cup	
