= Raf de Gregorio =

New Zealand footballer

Personal information
- Full name: Raffaele de Gregorio
- Date of birth: 20 May 1977 (age 49)
- Place of birth: Wellington, New Zealand
- Height: 1.76 m (5 ft 9 1/2 in)
- Position: Midfielder

Team information
- Current team: YoungHeart Manawatu
- Number: 16

Senior career*
Years	Team	Apps	(Gls)
1997–1998	Western Suburbs FC		
1998	Bohemians	7	(0)
1998–2000	FC Dordrecht	22	(1)
2001–2002	Clyde	8	(0)
2002–2003	Football Kingz	21	(1)
2003	FC Jokerit	8	(2)
2004	HJK Helsinki	11	(0)
2004–2005	Team Wellington	9	(4)
2005	HJK Helsinki	16	(1)
2005–2008	Team Wellington	31	(5)
2008–2010	YoungHeart Manawatu	23	(0)
Total		156	(14)

International career^{‡}
2000–2007	New Zealand	23	(2)
- * Club domestic league appearances and goals as of 29 April 2010 ‡ National team caps and goals as of 2 February 2007

Raf de Gregorio (born 20 May 1977 in Wellington) is a New Zealand former professional association football player.

== Club career ==
De Gregorio began his senior club career with Wellington United in 1997 before spending time in Europe with Bohemians, FC Dordrecht and Clyde. He returned to New Zealand in 2003, where he was a regular with the Football Kingz. A short spell with Finnish side FC Jokerit followed, before once again returning to New Zealand with Team Wellington. In 2005, de Gregorio again returned to Europe for a short spell with HJK Helsinki, but later rejoined Team Wellington.

== International career ==
He has also played for the New Zealand national football team, the All Whites, collecting 23 caps (scoring 2 goals) since making his debut in 2000 against China. De Gregorio was included in the New Zealand 2003 Confederations Cup squad. He scored New Zealand's only goal of the tournament in a 1–3 loss against Colombia.

== Career statistics ==
=== International ===
Appearances and goals by national team and year
National team	Year	Apps	Goals
New Zealand	2000	7	0
New Zealand	2002	2	1
New Zealand	2003	4	1
New Zealand	2004	4	0
New Zealand	2006	6	0
Total		23	2

Scores and results list New Zealand's goal tally first, score column indicates score after each de Gregorio goal.

List of international goals scored by Raf de Gregorio
No.	Date	Venue	Opponent	Score	Result	Competition	Ref.
1	7 July 2002	North Harbour Stadium, North Shore, New Zealand	Papua New Guinea	9–1	9–1	2002 OFC Nations Cup	
2	20 June 2003	Stade de Gerland, Lyon, France	Colombia	1–0	1–3	2003 FIFA Confederations Cup	
