= Lucien Mettomo =

Cameroonian footballer (born 1977)

Personal information
- Date of birth: 19 April 1977 (age 49)
- Place of birth: Douala, Cameroon
- Height: 1.84 m (6 ft 0 in)
- Position: Defender

Senior career*
Years	Team	Apps	(Gls)
1995–1996	Tonnerre Yaoundé	26	(2)
1996–2001	Saint-Étienne	81	(9)
2001–2003	Manchester City	27	(1)
2003–2006	1. FC Kaiserslautern	41	(2)
2006	Kayseri Erciyesspor	11	(0)
2006–2007	FC Luzern	25	(2)
2007–2008	Southampton	0	(0)
2008–2009	Veria	6	(0)
Total		217	(16)

International career
1997–2005	Cameroon	41	(1)
Medal record
Representing Cameroon
Africa Cup of Nations
Winner	2000 Ghana-Nigeria
Winner	2002 Mali
FIFA Confederations Cup
Runner-up	2003 France
- * Club domestic league appearances and goals

Lucien Mettomo (born 19 April 1977) is a Cameroonian former professional footballer who played as a defender for Tonnerre Yaoundé, Saint-Étienne, Manchester City, Kaiserslautern, Kayseri Erciyesspor and FC Luzern.

He was part of the Cameroon squad at the 2002 World Cup and the 2004 African Nations Cup. He was also part of the victorious 2000 and 2002 African Cup of Nations squads.

== Playing career ==
Mettomo was born in Douala. He made his name in France, playing for St. Étienne. He holds Cameroonian and French nationalities. He acquired French nationality by naturalization on 12 June 1998.

In September 2001, he signed for Manchester City of the English First Division for a £1.5 million fee. His Manchester City debut came as a substitute in a 6–0 League Cup defeat of Birmingham City. He played 23 league games that season, scoring once against Bradford, helping Manchester City to win the 2001–02 First Division Championship. The following season, Mettomo rarely featured in the first team due to the signing of Sylvain Distin. He made only four Premier League appearances, and in the close season signed for Kaiserslautern of the Bundesliga.

Mettomo went on trial with Norwich City in September 2007, but the club decided not to offer Mettomo a contract due to concerns over his fitness. Later that month, Mettomo signed a short-term deal at English Championship side Southampton that would run until the end of the 2007–08 season; this contract was cancelled in January, however, due to Mettomo's inability to break into the first team.

== Honours ==
Manchester City

- Football League First Division: 2001–02

Cameroon

- African Cup of Nations: 2000, 2002
- FIFA Confederations Cup runner-up: 2003
