= Jairo Patiño =

Colombian footballer (born 1978)

Personal information
- Full name: Jairo Leonard Patiño Rosero
- Date of birth: 5 April 1978 (age 48)
- Place of birth: Cali, Colombia
- Height: 1.81 m (5 ft 11 1/2 in)
- Position: Midfielder

Senior career*
Years	Team	Apps	(Gls)
1998	Deportivo Cali		
1999	Atlético Huila	31	(8)
2000	Deportivo Pasto	34	(10)
2001–2003	Deportivo Cali	70	(9)
2003–2004	Newell's Old Boys	31	(6)
2004–2006	River Plate	37	(2)
2007	Atlético Nacional	21	(8)
2007–2008	Banfield	35	(5)
2008–2009	San Luis	22	(4)
2009–2012	Atlético Nacional	46	(4)
2012–2013	Cúcuta Deportivo	19	(1)
2014	Deportivo Pasto	17	(1)
2015	Llaneros	2	(0)

International career
2003–2007	Colombia	35	(3)

Managerial career
- 2017–2018: Llaneros
- 2019: Bogotá
- 2020: Cúcuta Deportivo
- * Club domestic league appearances and goals

Jairo Leonard Patiño Rosero (born 5 April 1978) is a Colombian retired professional footballer who played as a midfielder.

== Club career ==
Nicknamed El Viejo, Patiño started his career in 1999 at his hometown club Deportivo Cali. He moved to Atlético Huila in 1999, and then to Deportivo Pasto in 2000. In 2001, he returned to Deportivo Cali, before moving to Argentina in 2003 to join Newell's Old Boys. After impressing in the Argentine Primera División, he was signed by River Plate in 2004 where he stayed until 2006. In January 2005, River Plate turned down a £2.78m offer from English club Crystal Palace, who were then in the Premier League.

He returned to Colombia to play for Atlético Nacional in 2007. In July 2007 he returned again to Argentina when he signed for Banfield. After he joined San Luis F.C. in Mexico. For the 2009–2010 season he went back to Colombia to join Atlético Nacional.

== International career ==
Patiño has been a regular in the Colombia national football team. He was part of the Colombian team that reached the semi-final of the 2003 FIFA Confederations Cup which they lost 1–0 to Cameroon. In this game Marc-Vivien Foé collapsed and died and Patiño was the closest player on the pitch to Foé at the time, and was the first to check on his situation.

He was part of the Colombian team that reached the semi finals of the 2005 CONCACAF Gold Cup in which Colombia lost 3–2 to Panama.

== Career statistics ==
=== International ===
Appearances and goals by national team and year
National team	Year	Apps	Goals
Colombia	2003	14	1
Colombia	2004	9	0
Colombia	2005	6	2
Colombia	2006	5	0
Colombia	2007	1	0
Total		35	3

Scores and results list Colombia's goal tally first, score column indicates score after each Patiño goal.

List of international goals scored by Jairo Patiño
No.	Date	Venue	Opponent	Score	Result	Competition	Ref.
1	13 July 2003	Miami Orange Bowl, Miami, United States	Jamaica	1–0	1–0	2003 CONCACAF Gold Cup	
2	21 July 2005	Giants Stadium, New York City, United States	Panama	1–2	2–3	2005 CONCACAF Gold Cup	
3	21 July 2005	Giants Stadium, New York City, United States	Panama	2–3	2–3	2005 CONCACAF Gold Cup	

== Honours ==
=== Individual ===
- CONCACAF Gold Cup Best XI: 2005
