= Rubén Darío Velázquez =

Colombian footballer (born 1975)

Personal information
- Full name: Rubén Darío Velázquez Bermúdez
- Date of birth: December 18, 1975 (age 50)
- Place of birth: Pueblo Rico, Colombia
- Height: 1.80 m (5 ft 11 in)
- Position: Midfielder

Senior career*
Years	Team	Apps	(Gls)
1993–1997	Atlético Nacional		
1997–2001	Once Caldas	115	(12)
2002	Cortuluá	11	(2)
2003–2005	Once Caldas	113	(16)
2006	Real Cartagena	8	(1)
2006	Colón de Santa Fe	2	(0)
2007	Deportivo Cali		
2008	Boyacá Chicó		
2009	Patriotas		

International career
1996–2007	Colombia	13	(0)
- * Club domestic league appearances and goals

Rubén Darío Velázquez Bermúdez (born December 18, 1975) is a retired Colombian footballer.

== Club career ==
Velázquez was part of the Once Caldas squad that won the 2004 Copa Libertadores title, surely the most unlikely team ever crowned champions of South America.

In 2006 Velázquez left Colombia for the first time in his career to join Colón de Santa Fe.

Season	Club	Title
1994	Atlético Nacional	Copa Mustang
Apertura 2003	Once Caldas	Copa Mustang
2004	Once Caldas	Copa Libertadores
