= Eudalio Arriaga =

Colombian footballer (born 1975)

Personal information
- Full name: Eudalio Eulises Arriaga Blandón
- Date of birth: 19 September 1975 (age 51)
- Place of birth: Turbo, Antioquia, Colombia
- Height: 1.78 m (5 ft 10 in)
- Position: Striker

Senior career*
Years	Team	Apps	(Gls)
1995–1998	Envigado	?	(?)
1999–2003	Junior	129	(20)
2002	→ Barcelona	19	(5)
2003–2005	Puebla	72	(9)
2006	Junior	28	(4)
2007	Danubio	9	(1)
2007	Bucaramanga	10	(1)
2007	Universidad San Martín	5	(0)
2008	Cúcuta Deportivo	11	(1)

International career
2001–2004	Colombia	14	(1)
- * Club domestic league appearances and goals as of 1 August 2008

Eudalio Eulises Arriaga Blandón (born 19 September 1975) is a former Colombian footballer that played as a forward.

== Career ==
Born in Turbo, Antioquia, Arriaga began playing professional football with Envigado. He made his league debut under manager Gabriel Jaime Gómez, appearing as a second-half substitute against Deportivo Cali on 23 March 1995. He would score his first league goal against América de Cali on 11 March 1996.

Arriaga played for a number of clubs in Colombia including Junior where he played over 100 games. He has also played in Mexico with Puebla, Barcelona Sporting Club in Ecuador, Danubio of Uruguay and Universidad San Martín of Peru. He is famous for his particular running gait, as one of his legs is shorter than the other, akin to football legend Garrincha, which made several narrators call him "Bamboleo" (wobble).

Arriaga played 14 times for the Colombia national team between 2001 and 2004. In 2001 he was part of the Colombia squad that won their first ever Copa América.

=== International goals ===
Colombia score listed first, score column indicates score after each Arriaga goal.

International goals by date, venue, cap, opponent, score, result and competition
No.	Date	Venue	Opponent	Score	Result	Competition
1	17 July 2001	Estadio Metropolitano, Barranquilla, Colombia	Chile	2–0	2–0	2001 Copa América

== Titles ==
Season	Team	Title
2001	Colombia	Copa América
Apertura 2005	Puebla	Mexican 2nd division
Apertura 2006	Puebla	Mexican 2nd division
Clausura 2007	Danubio	Primera División Uruguaya
