= Jacques Santini =

French football manager (born 1952)

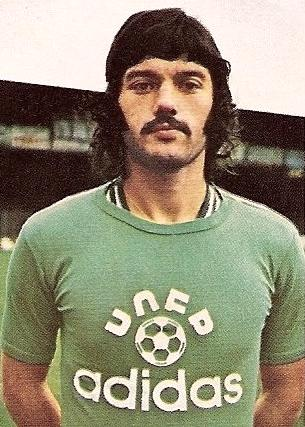
- Santini with Saint-Étienne in 1974

Personal information
- Full name: Jacques Jean Claude Santini
- Date of birth: 25 April 1952 (age 74)
- Place of birth: Delle, Territoire de Belfort, France
- Height: 1.79 m (5 ft 10 in)
- Position: Midfielder

Youth career
- 1964–1969: Fesches

Senior career*
| Years | Team | Apps | (Gls) |
| 1969–1981 | Saint-Étienne | 324 | (50) |
| 1981–1983 | Montpellier | 43 | (4) |
| 1983–1985 | Lisieux (fr) | | |

Managerial career
- 1983–1985: Lisieux (fr)
- 1985–1989: Toulouse
- 1989–1992: Lille
- 1992–1994: Saint-Étienne
- 1994–1995: Sochaux
- 2000–2002: Lyon
- 2002–2004: France
- 2004: Tottenham Hotspur
- 2005–2006: Auxerre
Medal record
Men's football
Representing France (as manager)
FIFA Confederations Cup
| Winner | 2003 |
- * Club domestic league appearances and goals

Jacques Jean Claude Santini (born 25 April 1952) is a French former professional footballer and manager. He played for Saint-Étienne during the 1970s, and reached the European Cup final with them in 1976. He has coached the France national team - winning the 2003 FIFA Confederations Cup and reaching the quarter-finals of Euro 2004 - and clubs including Lyon.

== Managerial career ==
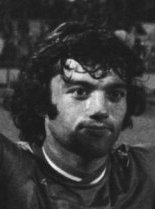
Santini with Saint-Étienne in 1976

Santini is one of the most accomplished football managers in France. Together with Jean Michel Aulas and Bernard Lacombe, he was involved in the transformation of Lyon into a French football giant. From 1997 to 2000, he was Sports Director, helping lay the foundation which resulted in Lyon becoming the best football club in France. As manager of Lyon from 2000 to 2002, he was winner of French League Cup in 2001 and, in 2002, he won the French Championship.

Santini was chosen as "The best French coach" in 2002 by France Football and World's The Best National Coach of the Year in 2003 by International Federation of Football History & Statistics (IFFHS). Santini replaced Roger Lemerre as France manager in 2002. He had already resigned from the position before Euro 2004, where France surprisingly lost to eventual champions Greece in the quarter-final.

Santini took the managerial position at Premier League club Tottenham Hotspur after Euro 2004. He surprisingly announced his resignation after just 13 games. Officially, Santini left England due to personal problems, but it was widely reported that a series of disagreements with then Sporting Director Frank Arnesen led to his departure. Speaking in 2005, Santini said he quit partly because he felt agreements with the club were broken, but he admitted he "dug his own grave" by agreeing to join the club before the end of Euro 2004.

He took the job of head coach of Auxerre in Ligue 1 in 2005, but was sacked in 2006 due to his conflict with vice-president of Auxerre Guy Roux.

On 23 June 2008, Santini was linked with the vacant managerial position at Scottish Premier League club Hearts, but he refused the offer.

== Managerial statistics ==
| Team | From | To | Record | | | | |
| Team | From | To | G | W | D | L | Win % |
|---|---|---|---|---|---|---|---|
| Toulouse | 1 July 1985 | 30 June 1989 | 174 | 71 | 58 | 45 | 40.80 |
| Lille | 1 July 1989 | 30 June 1992 | 120 | 37 | 43 | 40 | 30.83 |
| Saint-Étienne | 1 July 1992 | 30 June 1994 | 82 | 28 | 22 | 32 | 34.15 |
| Sochaux | 9 December 1994 | 30 June 1995 | 20 | 1 | 16 | 3 | 5.00 |
| Lyon | 1 July 2000 | 31 May 2002 | 106 | 55 | 24 | 27 | 51.89 |
| France | 21 July 2002 | 1 July 2004 | 28 | 22 | 4 | 2 | 78.57 |
| Tottenham Hotspur | 3 June 2004 | 5 November 2004 | 13 | 5 | 4 | 4 | 38.46 |
| Auxerre | 8 June 2005 | 17 May 2006 | 45 | 20 | 16 | 9 | 44.44 |
| Total | | | 588 | 239 | 187 | 162 | 40.65 |

== Honours ==
=== Player ===
Saint-Étienne

- Division 1: 1969–70, 1973–74, 1974–75, 1975–76, 1980–81
- Coupe de France: 1969–70, 1973–74, 1974–75, 1976–77

=== Manager ===
Lyon

- Division 1: 2001–02
- Coupe de la Ligue: 2000–01

France

- FIFA Confederations Cup: 2003
