= Stade de Gerland =

Stadium in Lyon, France

Matmut Stadium de Gerland
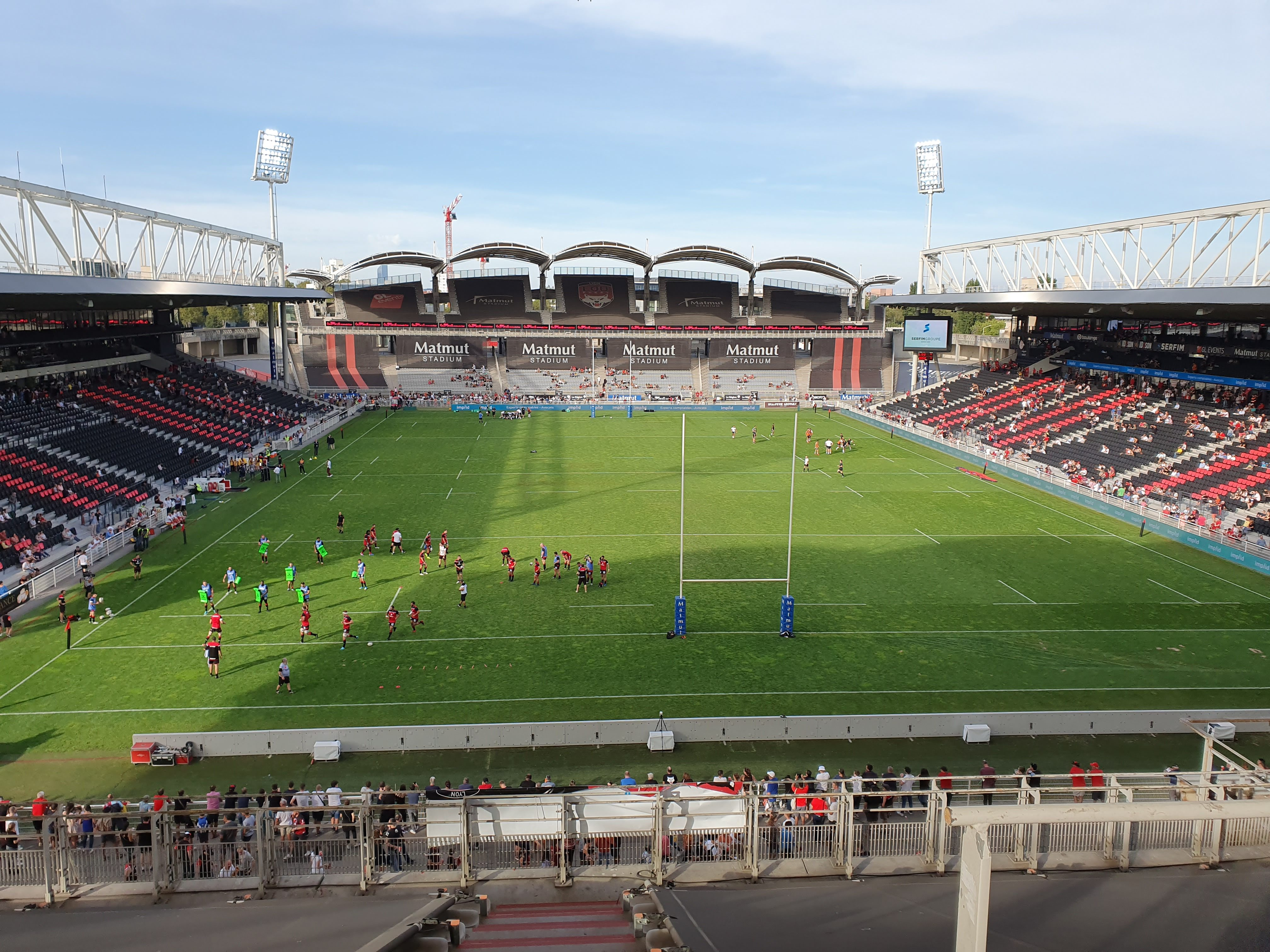
- UEFA
- Interactive map of Matmut Stadium de Gerland
- Full name: Matmut Stadium de Gerland
- Location: 353, Avenue Jean-Jaurès, 69007 VII^{è} Arrondissement, Lyon, France
- Coordinates: 45°43′26″N 4°49′56″E
- Owner: City of Lyon
- Operator: Lyon OU
- Capacity: 35,029
- Surface: Artificial
- Field size: 105 x 68 m
- Public transit: Stade de Gerland–Le LOU

Construction
- Built: 1914
- Opened: 23 May 1926; 100 years ago
- Renovated: 2017
- Expanded: 1960, 1980, 1998
- Cost: 32.7m € (including renovations)
- Architects: Tony Garnier; René Gagis (renovation)

Tenants
- Olympique Lyonnais (1950–2015); Lyon OU (2017–present)

The Stade de Gerland (known for sponsorship reasons as Matmut Stadium de Gerland and otherwise known as Municipal de Gerland or Stade Gerland [stad ʒɛʁlɑ̃]) is a stadium in the city of Lyon, France, which serves as home to Top 14 rugby club Lyon OU. It has a seating capacity of 35,029.

Situated in the Gerland quarter, it was used by French professional football club Olympique Lyonnais, who moved to the newly constructed Parc Olympique Lyonnais in 2016. Local rugby union club Lyon OU moved in beginning of 2017, replacing their much smaller stadium Matmut Stadium, which had been their home stadium since late 2011. The Stade de Gerland's capacity was also reduced from 43,000 to a more reasonable 35,029.

The stadium is listed as a Category three stadium by UEFA's standards and has hosted matches for the 1954 and 1972 Rugby League World Cups, UEFA Euro 1984, the 1998 FIFA World Cup, and the 2007 Rugby World Cup.

The stadium has hosted concerts by many famous artists, including The Rolling Stones, Michael Jackson, David Bowie, Pink Floyd and Genesis.

== History ==
In 1910, the mayor of Lyon, Édouard Herriot, came up with the idea to develop and build a sports stadium with an athletics track and a velodrome in the city. In 1912, the stadium was officially mandated and local architect Tony Garnier was given the reins to designing and constructing it. Construction began in 1914 with hopes that the stadium would be completed before the International Exhibition of 1914. However, due to World War I, construction was temporarily halted, but resumed with the assistance of a large number of German POWs following the war's conclusion in 1919. By 1920, the stadium was completely functional. In 1926, the Stade de Gerland was inaugurated by Herriot.

The stadium originally had a cycling track, but it was removed in order to increase the seating capacity to 50,000. In 1984, minor renovations were made to the stadium by architect Rene Gagis in order to bring the stadium up to standards for UEFA Euro 1984. This included construction of the Jean Bouin and Jean Jaurès stands. Further renovations were needed to prepare the stadium for the 1998 FIFA World Cup, as by that time FIFA had mandated that all stadiums used for international matches, including the World Cup, had to be all-seated. The north and south stands were completely dismantled and rebuilt, the Jean Jaurès and Jean Bouin side stands were untouched and the athletics track that had remained, even after the cycling track had been removed, was taken out. The renovations were done by architect Albert Constantin. The new incarnation of Gerland had a maximum capacity of 40,500.

From 1950 to 2015 the stadium was home to French professional football club Olympique Lyonnais. Lyon moved into the stadium as a result of splitting from the Lyon Olympique Universitaire sport club, which played at the Stade des Iris. Its record attendance for a Ligue 1 match is 48,552 set during a match between Olympique Lyonnais and Saint-Étienne in 1982.

== Artists ==
Stade de Gerland can also be used for events with mass audiences, such as concerts; in the past, it has hosted artists such as the Rolling Stones, Michael Jackson, Pink Floyd, and Genesis.

== Tournaments hosted ==
=== 1954 Rugby League World Cup ===
The stadium was one of the host venues for the first ever Rugby League World Cup, having seen the tournament's second group game between when Great Britain and Australia played at the stadium. Great Britain won the match 28–13.

=== 1972 Rugby League World Cup ===
Stade de Gerland was selected as a host venue during France's second time at hosting the tournament. The stadium, selected to host the 1972 Rugby League World Cup final, again between Great Britain and Australia. The game received a poor attendance of only 4,231 spectators with the French public seemingly uninterested in a final that did not involve French (the Final actually attracted the lowest attendance of the entire tournament). The game, however, proved a memorable one for both Great Britain and Australia; seeing Great Britain captain Clive Sullivan's long distance try, and Australia's "greatest try never scored", by fullback and captain Graeme Langlands. The try was disallowed by French referee Georges Jameau for offside, but was later proven on TV replay to be onside (to his credit, upon seeing the replay in the referees change room immediately after the game, Jameau sought out the Australian captain to apologize for his error). Great Britain hooker Mike Stephenson scored the 73rd-minute try that helped level the scores and secure the World Cup. Australia winger Ray Branighan missed his 79th-minute penalty, Bob Fulton failed three drop goal attempts in the last five minutes, resulting in a 10–10 scoreline at full time. Scores were again level after extra time.

Qualification for the final was achieved by a top two finish in the group stage, however with Great Britain finishing first and Australia second in the group, a draw for Great Britain would secure them the title.

=== UEFA Euro 1984 ===
The stadium was one of the venues of the UEFA Euro 1984, and held the following matches:

Date	Team #1	Res.	Team #2	Round	Attendance
16 June 1984	Denmark	5–0	Yugoslavia	Group 1	24,736
24 June 1984	Spain	1–1 (5–4 pen.)	Denmark	Semi-finals	47,843

=== 1998 FIFA World Cup ===
The stadium was one of the venues of the 1998 FIFA World Cup, and held the following matches:

Date	Team #1	Res.	Team #2	Round	Attendance
13 June 1998	South Korea	1–3	Mexico	Group E	39,100
15 June 1998	Romania	1–0	Colombia	Group G	39,100
21 June 1998	United States	1–2	Iran	Group F	39,100
24 June 1998	France	2–1	Denmark	Group C	39,100
26 June 1998	Japan	1–2	Jamaica	Group H	39,100
4 July 1998	Germany	0–3	Croatia	Quarter-finals	39,100

=== 2003 FIFA Confederations Cup ===
The stadium was one of the venues of the 2003 FIFA Confederations Cup, and held the following matches:

Date	Team #1	Result	Team #2	Round	Attendance
18 June 2003	France	1–0	Colombia	Group A	38,541
20 June 2003	Colombia	3–1	New Zealand	Group A	22,811
21 June 2003	Brazil	1–0	United States	Group B	20,306
23 June 2003	United States	0–0	Cameroon	Group B	19,206
26 June 2003	Cameroon	1–0	Colombia	Semi-finals	12,352

On 26 June 2003, Cameroon faced Colombia in the semi-final, held here. In the 72nd minute of the match Marc-Vivien Foé collapsed in the centre circle with no other players near him. After attempts to resuscitate him on the pitch, he was stretchered off the field, where he received mouth-to-mouth resuscitation and oxygen. Medics spent 45 minutes attempting to restart his heart, and although he was still alive upon arrival at the stadium's medical centre, he died shortly afterwards. A first autopsy did not determine an exact cause of death, but a second autopsy concluded that Foé's death was heart-related as it discovered evidence of hypertrophic cardiomyopathy, a hereditary condition known to increase the risk of sudden death during physical exercise.

=== 2007 Rugby World Cup ===
The stadium was one of the venues of the 2007 Rugby World Cup, and held the following matches:

Date	Time (CET)	Team #1	Result	Team #2	Round	Attendance
8 September 2007	15:45	Australia	91–3	Japan	Pool B	40,043
11 September 2007	20:00	Argentina	33–3	Georgia	Pool D	40,240
15 September 2007	13:00	New Zealand	108–13	Portugal	Pool C	40,729

== See also ==
- List of football stadiums in France
- Parc Henry Chabert

Preceded by Headingley Carnegie Rugby Stadium; Leeds	Rugby League World Cup; Final venue 1972	Succeeded by Sydney Cricket Ground; Sydney
Preceded by De Kuip; Rotterdam	European Cup Winners' Cup; Final venue 1986	Succeeded by Spyros Louis Stadium; Athens
