= 2003 FIFA Confederations Cup =

Coupe des Confédérations 2003

Tournament details
- Host country: France
- Dates: 18–29 June
- Teams: 8 (from 6 confederations)
- Venues: 3 (in 3 host cities)

Final positions
- Champions: France (2nd title)
- Runners-up: Cameroon
- Third place: Turkey
- Fourth place: Colombia

Tournament statistics
- Matches played: 16
- Goals scored: 37 (2.31 per match)
- Attendance: 491,700 (30,731 per match)
- Top scorer: (France) Thierry Henry (4 goals)
- Best player: (France) Thierry Henry
- Fair play award: Japan

The 2003 FIFA Confederations Cup football tournament was the sixth FIFA Confederations Cup, held in June 2003. Hosts France retained the title they had won in 2001, but the tournament was overshadowed by the death of Cameroonian midfielder Marc-Vivien Foé, who died of heart failure in his side's semi-final against Colombia. Foé's death united the French and Cameroonian teams in the final match, which was played even though players from both sides had explicitly stated that the match should not be played out of respect for Foé. France went on to win with a golden goal from Thierry Henry.

At the presentation of medals and trophies, two Cameroon players held a large photo of Foé and a runner-up medal was hung to the edge of the photo. When French captain Marcel Desailly was presented with the Confederations Cup, which he held in unison with Cameroon captain Rigobert Song. Foé finished third in media voting for player of the tournament and was posthumously awarded the Bronze Ball at its conclusion.

This was the last Confederations Cup that did not serve as a warm-up event to the FIFA World Cup.

== Qualified teams ==
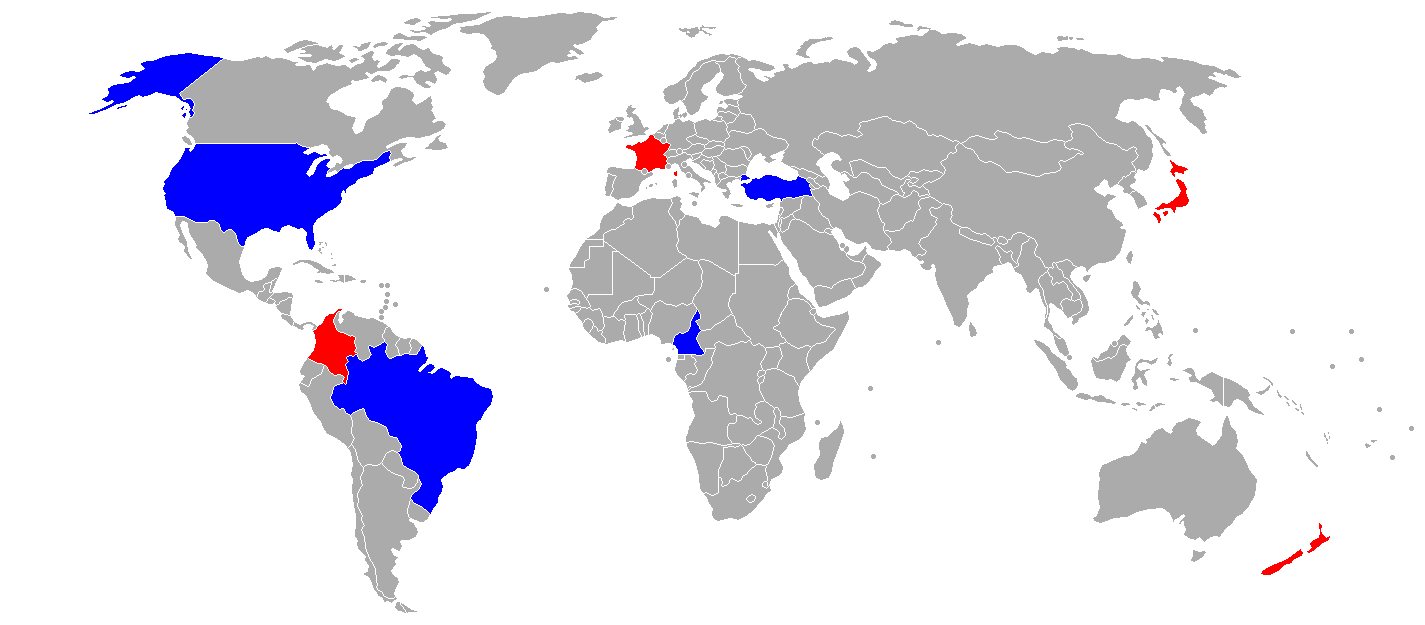
2003 FIFA Confederations Cup participating teams Red – Participated in Group A Blue – Participated in Group B

Team	Confederation	Qualification method	Date qualification secured	Participation no.
France	UEFA	UEFA Euro 2000 winners Hosts	2 July 2000; 24 September 2002	2nd
Brazil	CONMEBOL	2002 FIFA World Cup winners	30 June 2002	4th
Japan	AFC	2000 AFC Asian Cup winners	29 October 2000	3rd
Colombia	CONMEBOL	2001 Copa América winners	29 July 2001	1st
United States	CONCACAF	2002 CONCACAF Gold Cup winners	2 February 2002	3rd
Cameroon	CAF	2002 African Cup of Nations winners	10 February 2002	2nd
Turkey	UEFA	2002 FIFA World Cup third place^{1}	22 October 2002	1st
New Zealand	OFC	2002 OFC Nations Cup winners	14 July 2002	2nd

^{1} Italy, the UEFA Euro 2000 runners-up, declined to take part as did Germany, the 2002 FIFA World Cup runners-up. So did Spain, who were ranked second in the FIFA World Rankings at the time. They were replaced by Turkey, who came third in the 2002 FIFA World Cup.

== Bid process ==
Five bids came before the deadline at 1 May 2002. Australia, Portugal and the United States put in single bids, while South Africa–Egypt and France–Switzerland put in joint bids. The France–Switzerland bid never materialized.

The host was selected on 24 September 2002, during a meeting of the FIFA Executive Committee.

== Venues ==
The matches were played in:

Paris (Saint-Denis)	Lyon	Saint-Étienne
Stade de France	Stade de Gerland	Stade Geoffroy-Guichard
48°55′28″N 2°21′36″E	45°43′26″N 4°49′56″E	45°27′38.76″N 4°23′24.42″E
Capacity: 80,000	Capacity: 41,200	Capacity: 36,000
2003 FIFA Confederations Cup is located in France

== Match officials ==
Africa

- Coffi Codjia (Benin)

Asia

- Masoud Moradi (Iran)

Europe

- Lucílio Batista (Portugal)
- Valentin Ivanov (Russia)
- Markus Merk (Germany)

North America, Central America and Caribbean

- Carlos Batres (Guatemala)

Oceania

- Mark Shield (Australia)

South America

- Carlos Amarilla (Paraguay)
- Jorge Larrionda (Uruguay)

== Group stage ==
=== Group A ===
Team	Pld	W	D	L	GF	GA	GD	Pts
France	3	3	0	0	8	1	+7	9
Colombia	3	2	0	1	4	2	+2	6
Japan	3	1	0	2	4	3	+1	3
New Zealand	3	0	0	3	1	11	−10	0

18 June 2003
18:00 CEST

New Zealand	0–3	Japan
	Report	Nakamura 12', 75'; Nakata 65'

Stade de France, Saint-Denis
Attendance: 36,038
Referee: Coffi Codjia (Benin)

18 June 2003
21:00 CEST

France	1–0	Colombia
Henry 39' (pen.)	Report

Stade de Gerland, Lyon
Attendance: 38,541
Referee: Lucílio Batista (Portugal)

20 June 2003
19:00 CEST

Colombia	3–1	New Zealand
López 58'; Yepes 75'; Hernández 85'	Report	De Gregorio 27'

Stade de Gerland, Lyon
Attendance: 22,811
Referee: Carlos Batres (Guatemala)

20 June 2003
21:00 CEST

France	2–1	Japan
Pires 43' (pen.); Govou 65'	Report	Nakamura 59'

Stade Geoffroy-Guichard, Saint-Étienne
Attendance: 33,070
Referee: Mark Shield (Australia)

22 June 2003
21:00 CEST

France	5–0	New Zealand
Kapo 17'; Henry 20'; Cissé 71'; Giuly 90+1'; Pires 90+3'	Report

Stade de France, Saint-Denis
Attendance: 36,842
Referee: Masoud Moradi (Iran)

22 June 2003
21:00 CEST

Japan	0–1	Colombia
	Report	Hernández 68'

Stade Geoffroy-Guichard, Saint-Étienne
Attendance: 24,541
Referee: Jorge Larrionda (Uruguay)

=== Group B ===
Team	Pld	W	D	L	GF	GA	GD	Pts
Cameroon	3	2	1	0	2	0	+2	7
Turkey	3	1	1	1	4	4	0	4
Brazil	3	1	1	1	3	3	0	4
United States	3	0	1	2	1	3	−2	1

19 June 2003
19:00 CEST

Turkey	2–1	United States
Okan 40' (pen.); Tuncay 71'	Report	Beasley 37'

Stade Geoffroy-Guichard, Saint-Étienne
Attendance: 16,944
Referee: Jorge Larrionda (Uruguay)

19 June 2003
21:00 CEST

Brazil	0–1	Cameroon
	Report	Eto'o 83'

Stade de France, Saint-Denis
Attendance: 46,719
Referee: Valentin Ivanov (Russia)

21 June 2003
19:00 CEST

Cameroon	1–0	Turkey
Geremi 90+1' (pen.)	Report

Stade de France, Saint-Denis
Attendance: 43,743
Referee: Carlos Amarilla (Paraguay)

21 June 2003
21:00 CEST

Brazil	1–0	United States
Adriano 22'	Report

Stade de Gerland, Lyon
Attendance: 20,306
Referee: Lucílio Batista (Portugal)

23 June 2003
21:00 CEST

Brazil	2–2	Turkey
Adriano 23'; Alex 90+3'	Report	Gökdeniz 53'; Okan 81'

Stade Geoffroy-Guichard, Saint-Étienne
Attendance: 29,170
Referee: Markus Merk (Germany)

23 June 2003
21:00 CEST

United States	0–0	Cameroon
	Report

Stade de Gerland, Lyon
Attendance: 19,206
Referee: Mark Shield (Australia)

== Knockout stage ==
Semi-finals
26 June - Lyon
Cameroon	1
Colombia	0
26 June - Saint-Denis
France	3
Turkey	2

Final
29 June - Saint-Denis
Cameroon	0
France (asdet)	1
Third place
28 June - Saint-Étienne
Colombia	1
Turkey	2

=== Semi-finals ===
26 June 2003
18:00 CEST

Cameroon	1–0	Colombia
Ndiefi 9'	Report

Stade de Gerland, Lyon
Attendance: 12,352
Referee: Markus Merk (Germany)

26 June 2003
21:00 CEST

France	3–2	Turkey
Henry 11'; Pires 26'; Wiltord 43'	Report	Gökdeniz 42'; Tuncay 48'

Stade de France, Saint-Denis
Attendance: 41,195
Referee: Jorge Larrionda (Uruguay)

=== Third place play-off ===
28 June 2003
18:00 CEST

Colombia	1–2	Turkey
Hernández 63'	Report	Tuncay 2'; Okan 86'

Stade Geoffroy-Guichard, Saint-Étienne
Attendance: 18,237
Referee: Mark Shield (Australia)

=== Final ===
29 June 2003
21:00 CEST

Cameroon	0–1 (a.e.t./g.g.)	France
	Report	Henry 97'

Stade de France, Saint-Denis
Attendance: 51,985
Referee: Valentin Ivanov (Russia)

== Awards ==
=== Golden Ball ===
The Golden Ball award is given to the tournament's best player, as voted by the media.

Awards	Golden Ball	Silver Ball	Bronze Ball
Players	Thierry Henry	Tuncay Şanlı	Marc-Vivien Foé
Team	France	Turkey	Cameroon
Votes	28%	15%	7%

=== Golden Shoe ===
The Golden Shoe award is given to the tournament's top goalscorer.

Awards	Golden Shoe	Silver Shoe	Bronze Shoe
Players	Thierry Henry	Tuncay Şanlı (Note: Although four other players had three goals each, Tuncay Şanlı received the Silver Shoe award as he was the only one of the five to have registered an assist in the competition.)	Shunsuke Nakamura (Note: Lowest number of minutes played (170). Giovanni Hernández, Robert Pires and Okan Yılmaz also produced/recorded three goals and zero assists.)
Team	France	Turkey	Japan
Goals	4	3	3

=== FIFA Fair Play Award ===
FIFA presents the Fair Play Award to the team with the best fair play record, according to a points system and criteria established by the FIFA Fair Play Committee.

FIFA Fair Play Award
Team	Japan
Total	895
Matches played	3
Maximum	1,000

Source: FIFA

== Statistics ==
=== Goalscorers ===
Thierry Henry received the Golden Shoe award for scoring four goals. In total, 37 goals were scored by 22 different players, with none of them credited as own goal.

4 goals

- (France) Thierry Henry

3 goals

- (Colombia) Giovanni Hernández
- (France) Robert Pires
- (Japan) Shunsuke Nakamura
- (Turkey) Tuncay Şanlı
- (Turkey) Okan Yılmaz

2 goals

- (Brazil) Adriano
- (Turkey) Gökdeniz Karadeniz

1 goal

- (Brazil) Alex
- (Cameroon) Samuel Eto'o
- (Cameroon) Geremi
- (Cameroon) Pius Ndiefi
- (Colombia) Jorge López
- (Colombia) Mario Yepes
- (France) Djibril Cissé
- (France) Ludovic Giuly
- (France) Sidney Govou
- (France) Olivier Kapo
- (France) Sylvain Wiltord
- (Japan) Hidetoshi Nakata
- (New Zealand) Raf de Gregorio
- (United States) DaMarcus Beasley

=== Tournament ranking ===
Per statistical convention in football, matches decided in extra time are counted as wins and losses, while matches decided by penalty shoot-outs are counted as draws.

Pos	Grp	Team	Pld	W	D	L	GF	GA	GD	Pts	Final result
1	A	France (H)	5	5	0	0	12	3	+9	15	Champions
2	B	Cameroon	5	3	1	1	3	1	+2	10	Runners-up
3	B	Turkey	5	2	1	2	8	8	0	7	Third place
4	A	Colombia	5	2	0	3	5	5	0	6	Fourth place
5	B	Brazil	3	1	1	1	3	3	0	4	Eliminated in group stage
6	A	Japan	3	1	0	2	4	3	+1	3	Eliminated in group stage
7	B	United States	3	0	1	2	1	3	−2	1	Eliminated in group stage
8	A	New Zealand	3	0	0	3	1	11	−10	0	Eliminated in group stage

Source: FIFA
(H) Hosts
