= 2004 UEFA European Under-21 Championship qualification Group 4 =

Football tournament qualification stage

The teams competing in Group 4 of the 2004 UEFA European Under-21 Championships qualifying competition were Sweden, Poland, Hungary, Latvia and San Marino.

== Standings ==
Team	Pld	W	D	L	GF	GA	GD	Pts
Poland	8	6	2	0	24	6	+18	20
Sweden	8	4	2	2	17	13	+4	14
Hungary	8	4	0	4	17	13	+4	12
Latvia	8	3	0	5	11	16	−5	9
San Marino	8	1	0	7	8	29	−21	3

	(Hungary)	(Latvia)	(Poland)	(San Marino)	(Sweden)
Hungary	—	3–1	1–2	4–1	5–2
Latvia	2–0	—	0–2	4–1	0–4
Poland	3–2	3–0	—	7–0	1–1
San Marino	1–2	0–2	1–5	—	1–5
Sweden	1–0	3–2	1–1	0–3^{*}	—

^{*} Match originally ended as a 6–0 victory for Sweden, but UEFA later awarded the match as a 3–0 forfeit win to San Marino due to Sweden including suspended players in their squad.

== Matches ==
All times are CET.

6 September 2002
18:00

Latvia	0 – 4	Sweden
	Report	Talebinejad 22', 28', 55'; Elmander 54' (pen.)

Daugava Stadium, Liepāja
Attendance: 850
Referee: David Malcolm (Northern Ireland)
6 September 2002
20:30

San Marino	1 – 5	Poland
Ciacci 69'	Report	Mila 9'; Olszar 40', 52'; Rachwał 59'; Grzelak 83'

Stadio Olimpico, Serravalle
Attendance: 300
Referee: Sead Kulović (Bosnia and Herzegovina)

11 October 2002
15:00

Poland	3 – 0	Latvia
Stasiak 35'; Goliński 44'; Zganiacz 89'	Report

Grójec GOS Mazowsze, Grójec
Attendance: 837
Referee: Muhittin Boşat (Turkey)
11 October 2002
19:00

Sweden	1 – 0	Hungary
Farnerud 84'	Report

Arosvallen, Västeras
Attendance: 3,427
Referee: Mark Halsey (England)

15 October 2002
15:00

Hungary	4 – 1	San Marino
Bajzát 23'; Bodor 47'; Czvitkovics 65', 90'	Report	Ciacci 44'

Széktói Stadion, Kecskemét
Attendance: 3,000
Referee: Khagani Mammadov (Azerbaijan)

19 November 2002
20:30

San Marino	0 – 2	Latvia
	Report	Karlsons 15'; Kalns 53'

Stadio Olimpico, Serravalle
Attendance: 500
Referee: Gevorg Hovhannisyan (Armenia)

28 March 2003
16:00

Poland	3 – 2	Hungary
Ślusarski 17'; Goliński 23'; Madej 89'	Report	Németh 29'; Koplárovics 48'

Stadion Odry Opole, Opole
Attendance: 3,651
Referee: Gerald Lehner (Austria)

1 April 2003
16:00

Poland	7 – 0	San Marino
Olszar 9'; Rachwał 10'; Mazurkiewicz 26'; Ślusarski 60', 66'; Grzelak 71'; Goliński 88'	Report

Stadion GKS Nowiny, Nowiny
Attendance: 1,200
Referee: Sergey Kapanin (Kazakhstan)
2 April 2003
16:30

Hungary	5 – 2	Sweden
Szabics 65', 69', 72' (pen.), 88'; Németh 79'	Report	Andersson 75', 82'

Üllői úti stadion, Budapest
Attendance: 1,500
Referee: Johny Ver Eecke (Belgium)

29 April 2003
18:00

Latvia	4 – 1	San Marino
Kolesnikovs 12', 35', 72'; Kalns 41'	Report	Marani 28'

Daugava Stadium, Liepāja
Attendance: 732
Referee: Lassin Isaksen (Faroe Islands)

6 June 2003
17:30

Hungary	3 – 1	Latvia
Buzsáky 11' (pen.); Torghelle 34', 41'	Report	Kolesnikovs 14'

Stadion Eszperantó Út, Dunaújváros
Attendance: 2,500
Referee: Ghenadie Orlic (Moldova)
6 June 2003
20:30

San Marino	1 – 5	Sweden
Renzi 41'	Report	Djordjic 24'; Ålander 58'; Ishizaki 64' (pen.); Elmander 77'; Farnerud 90+2'

Stadio Olimpico, Serravalle
Attendance: 225
Referee: Albano Janku (Albania)

10 June 2003
19:00

Sweden	1 – 1	Poland
Stefanidis 7'	Report	Mila 49'

Idrottsparken, Sundsvall
Attendance: 3,381
Referee: René Rogalla (Switzerland)
10 June 2003
20:30

San Marino	1 – 2	Hungary
Renzi 65' (pen.)	Report	Buzsáky 28'; Bodor 90+1'

Stadio Olimpico, Serravalle
Attendance: 521
Referee: Anthony Zammit (Malta)

5 September 2003
17:00

Latvia	0 – 2	Poland
	Report	Nawotczyński 42'; Olszar 62'

Daugava Stadium, Liepāja
Attendance: 800
Referee: Nebojša Rabrenović (Montenegro)
5 September 2003
18:30

Sweden	0 – 3 (awarded)	San Marino
Nilsson 22'; Antonsson 23'; Andersson 34'; Ishizaki 40'; Johansson 43'; Farnerud 53'	Report

Edsborgs IP, Trollhättan
Attendance: 7,864
Referee: Kuddusi Müftüoğlu (Turkey)

Match originally ended as a 6–0 victory for Sweden, but UEFA later awarded the match as a 3–0 forfeit win to San Marino due to Sweden including suspended players in their squad.

9 September 2003
17:00

Poland	1 – 1	Sweden
Nowacki 48'	Report	Piñones-Arce 7'

Stadion Miejski, Wodzisław Śląski
Attendance: 2,662
Referee: Yuri Baskakov (Russia)
9 September 2003
17:00

Latvia	2 – 0	Hungary
Kalniņš 59', 79'	Report

Daugava Stadium, Liepāja
Attendance: 600
Referee: Alfonso Pérez Burrull (Spain)

10 October 2003
19:00

Sweden	3 – 2	Latvia
Elmander 3', 14'; Hysén 87'	Report	Karlsons 70'; Butriks 80'

Tunavallen, Eskilstuna
Attendance: 4,024
Referee: Johan Verbist (Belgium)
10 October 2003
19:00

Hungary	1 – 2	Poland
Tóth 60'	Report	Smolarek 79'; Brożek 90+2'

Hidegkuti Nándor Stadium, Budapest
Attendance: 2,500
Referee: Paolo Bertini (Italy)

== Goalscorers ==
4 goals

- (Hungary) Imre Szabics
- (Latvia) Aleksejs Kolesnikovs
- (Poland) Sebastian Olszar
- (Sweden) Johan Elmander

3 goals

- (Poland) Michał Goliński
- (Poland) Bartosz Ślusarski
- (Sweden) Arash Talebinejad

2 goals

- (Hungary) Boldizsár Bodor
- (Hungary) Ákos Buzsáky
- (Hungary) Péter Czvitkovics
- (Hungary) Norbert Németh
- (Hungary) Sándor Torghelle
- (Latvia) Gatis Kalniņš
- (Latvia) Jurģis Kalns
- (Latvia) Ģirts Karlsons
- (Poland) Rafał Grzelak
- (Poland) Sebastian Mila
- (Poland) Patryk Rachwał
- (San Marino) Nicola Ciacci
- (San Marino) Alexander Renzi
- (Sweden) Johan Andersson
- (Sweden) Alexander Farnerud

1 goal

- (Hungary) Péter Bajzát
- (Hungary) Béla Koplárovics
- (Hungary) Balázs Tóth
- (Latvia) Andrejs Butriks
- (Poland) Piotr Brożek
- (Poland) Łukasz Madej
- (Poland) Tomasz Mazurkiewicz
- (Poland) Łukasz Nawotczyński
- (Poland) Marcin Nowacki
- (Poland) Ebi Smolarek
- (Poland) Michał Stasiak
- (Poland) Mariusz Zganiacz
- (San Marino) Manuel Marani
- (Sweden) Stefan Ålander
- (Sweden) Bojan Djordjic
- (Sweden) Tobias Hysén
- (Sweden) Stefan Ishizaki
- (Sweden) Pablo Piñones-Arce
- (Sweden) Babis Stefanidis
