= Putter (disambiguation) =

A putter is a club used in the sport of golf.

Putter may also refer to:

People:

- Pütter, a short list of people with the surname
- Andries Putter (1936-2014), South African vice admiral, twice Chief of the South African Navy
- Eddy Putter (born 1982), Dutch football player
- Putter Smith (born 1941), American jazz bassist

Other uses:

- Putter (mining), a miner who pushes ore trucks around the mine
- Pütter See, a lake in Mecklenburg-Vorpommern, Germany

== See also ==
- de Putter
