= 2004 UEFA European Under-21 Championship qualification Group 2 =

These are the teams in Group 2 of the 2004 UEFA Under-21 championship qualifiers

The teams competing in Group 2 of the 2004 UEFA European Under-21 Championships qualifying competition were Romania, Denmark, Norway, Bosnia and Herzegovina and Luxembourg.

== Standings ==
Team	Pld	W	D	L	GF	GA	GD	Pts
Norway	8	6	1	1	19	4	+15	19
Denmark	8	6	1	1	24	3	+21	19
Bosnia and Herzegovina	8	4	1	3	6	10	−4	13
Romania	8	2	1	5	6	7	−1	7
Luxembourg	8	0	0	8	0	31	−31	0

	(Bosnia and Herzegovina)	(Denmark)	(Luxembourg)	(Norway)	(Romania)
Bosnia and Herzegovina	—	0–3	1–0	1–3	2–1
Denmark	3–0	—	9–0	2–0	0–0
Luxembourg	0–1	0–6	—	0–5	0–2
Norway	0–0	3–0	5–0	—	2–1
Romania	0–1	0–1	2–0	0–1	—

== Matches ==
All times are CET.

6 September 2002
17:30

Norway	3 – 0	Denmark
Ludvigsen 8'; Karadas 46'; Brenne 57'	Report

Marienlyst Stadion, Drammen
Attendance: 1,021
Referee: Edo Trivković (Croatia)
6 September 2002
20:15

Bosnia and Herzegovina	2 – 1	Romania
Stajić 27'; Terkeš 52'	Report	Chihaia 67'

Bilino Polje, Zenica
Attendance: 551
Referee: Jozef Kacenga (Slovakia)

11 October 2002
18:30

Denmark	9 – 0	Luxembourg
Bechmann 6'; Augustinussen 19', 67', 79'; Thomassen 26'; Silberbauer 48' (pen.); Kristiansen 50'; Mtiliga 83'; Christensen 90'	Report

Farum Park, Farum
Attendance: 1,117
Referee: Sokol Jareci (Albania)
11 October 2002
19:00

Romania	0 – 1	Norway
	Report	Ystaas 60'

Stadionul Cotroceni, Bucharest
Attendance: 2,000
Referee: Karel Vidlak (Czech Republic)

15 October 2002
18:00

Norway	0 – 0	Bosnia and Herzegovina
	Report

Marienlyst Stadion, Drammen
Attendance: 1,280
Referee: Vasyl Melnychuk (Ukraine)
15 October 2002
19:30

Luxembourg	0 – 2	Romania
	Report	Grigorie 10'; Opriţa 87'

Stade Communal, Mondercange
Attendance: 350
Referee: Anastasios Papaioannou (Cyprus)

28 March 2003
15:00

Bosnia and Herzegovina	1 – 0	Luxembourg
Blatnjak 68' (pen.)	Report

Stadion Hrasnica, Sarajevo
Attendance: 800
Referee: Paulius Malžinskas (Lithuania)
28 March 2003
16:00

Romania	0 – 1	Denmark
	Report	Bechmann 70'

Stadionul Giuleşti-Valentin Stănescu, Bucharest
Attendance: 2,300
Referee: Robert Styles (England)

1 April 2003
18:00

Denmark	3 – 0	Bosnia and Herzegovina
Bechmann 25'; Kahlenberg 79', 84'	Report

Koge Stadion, Koge
Attendance: 800
Referee: Michael Thomas Ross (Northern Ireland)
1 April 2003
19:30

Luxembourg	0 – 5	Norway
	Report	Solli 16'; Pedersen 23'; Karadas 35' (pen.), 57'; Gashi 90+2'

Stade Am Deich, Ettelbruck
Attendance: 150
Referee: Zohrab Gadiyev (Azerbaijan)

6 June 2003
17:00

Romania	0 – 1	Bosnia and Herzegovina
	Report	Pelak 65'

Romanescu Parc, Craiova
Attendance: 2,500
Referee: Nikolaos Agelakis (Greece)
6 June 2003
18:30

Denmark	2 – 0	Norway
Bechmann 58', 80'	Report

Farum Park, Farum
Attendance: 2,005
Referee: Florian Meyer (Germany)

10 June 2003
19:00

Norway	2 – 1	Romania
Pedersen 54'; Ludvigsen 75'	Report	Chihaia 62'

Marienlyst Stadion, Drammen
Attendance: 1,386
Referee: Ben Haverkort (Netherlands)
10 June 2003
19:30

Luxembourg	0 – 6	Denmark
	Report	Olesen 32'; Loose 50' (o.g.); Kristiansen 53'; Andreasen 70'; Augustinussen 75'; Cagara 90'

Stade Alphonse Theis, Hesperange
Attendance: 600
Referee: Gevorg Hovhannisyan (Armenia)

5 September 2003
16:15

Bosnia and Herzegovina	1 – 3	Norway
Blatnjak 90'	Report	Pedersen 38'; Ystaas 40'; Karadas 87' (pen.)

Stadion Pirota, Travnik
Attendance: 1,750
Referee: Paul Mckeon (Republic of Ireland)
5 September 2003
19:00

Romania	2 – 0	Luxembourg
Marica 46', 49'	Report

Stadionul Mogoşoaia, Mogoşoaia
Attendance: 800
Referee: Joseph Attard (Malta)

9 September 2003
18:30

Denmark	0 – 0	Romania
	Report

Farum Park, Farum
Attendance: 1,485
Referee: Bertrand Layec (France)
9 September 2003
19:30

Luxembourg	0 – 1	Bosnia and Herzegovina
	Report	Stajić 16'

Stade Géitz, Wiltz
Attendance: 595
Referee: Craig Alexander Thomson (Scotland)

10 October 2003
15:30

Norway	5 – 0	Luxembourg
Gashi 18'; Karadas 49', 54', 68'; Solli 59'	Report

Brann Stadion, Bergen
Attendance: 712
Referee: Gerald Lehner (Austria)
10 October 2003
15:30

Bosnia and Herzegovina	0 – 3	Denmark
	Report	Bechmann 10', 20'; Tahirović 30' (o.g.)

Stadion Pirota, Travnik
Attendance: 1,800
Referee: Attila Hanacsek (Hungary)

== Goalscorers ==
7 goals

- (Denmark) Tommy Bechmann
- (Norway) Azar Karadas

4 goals

- (Denmark) Thomas Augustinussen

3 goals

- (Norway) Morten Gamst Pedersen

2 goals

- (Bosnia and Herzegovina) Dragan Blatnjak
- (Bosnia and Herzegovina) Duško Stajić
- (Denmark) Thomas Kahlenberg
- (Denmark) Jan Kristiansen
- (Norway) Ardian Gashi
- (Norway) Trond Fredrik Ludvigsen
- (Norway) Jan Gunnar Solli
- (Norway) Kristian Ystaas
- (Romania) Octavian Chihaia
- (Romania) Ciprian Marica

1 goal

- (Bosnia and Herzegovina) Albin Pelak
- (Bosnia and Herzegovina) Želimir Terkeš
- (Denmark) Leon Andreasen
- (Denmark) Dennis Cagara
- (Denmark) Tom Christensen
- (Denmark) Patrick Mtiliga
- (Denmark) Allan Olesen
- (Denmark) Michael Silberbauer
- (Denmark) Dan Thomassen
- (Norway) Simen Brenne
- (Romania) Ştefan Grigorie
- (Romania) Daniel Opriţa

1 own goal

- (Bosnia and Herzegovina) Haris Tahirović (playing against Denmark)
- (Luxembourg) Yannick Loose (playing against Denmark)
