= 2004 UEFA European Under-21 Championship qualification Group 7 =

Football tournament qualification stage

The competing in Group 7 of the 2004 UEFA European Under-21 Championships qualifying competition were Turkey, England, Slovakia, Macedonia and Portugal.

== Standings ==
Team	Pld	W	D	L	GF	GA	GD	Pts
Turkey	8	7	1	0	18	5	+13	22
Portugal	8	6	0	2	20	11	+9	18
England	8	3	2	3	14	10	+4	11
Slovakia	8	2	0	6	9	16	−7	6
Macedonia	8	0	1	7	4	23	−19	1

	(England)	(North Macedonia)	(Portugal)	(Slovakia)	(Turkey)
England	—	3–1	1–2	2–0	1–1
Macedonia	1–1	—	1–4	0–2	0–4
Portugal	4–2	1–0	—	4–1	1–2
Slovakia	0–4	5–1	0–2	—	0–1
Turkey	1–0	3–0	4–2	2–1	—

== Matches ==
All times are CET.

6 September 2002
18:15

Turkey	2 – 1	Slovakia
Şahin 50'; Aslan 90+5' (pen.)	Report	Jež 3'

BJK İnönü Stadium, Istanbul
Attendance: 3,000
Referee: Damien Ledentu (France)
6 September 2002
22:00

Portugal	1 – 0	Macedonia
Postiga 67'	Report

Estádio do Varzim Sport Club, Póvoa de Varzim
Attendance: 3,800
Referee: Jack C. D. Van Hulten (Netherlands)

11 October 2002
15:00

Macedonia	0 – 4	Turkey
	Report	Tuncay 23', 65'; Yavuz 67'; Meglenski 88' (o.g.)

Gradski Stadion, Kavadarci
Attendance: 2,100
Referee: Markus Nobs (Switzerland)
11 October 2002
18:00

Slovakia	0 – 4	England
	Report	Ameobi 35'; Jeffers 63', 76'; Cole 87'

Štadión Antona Malatinského, Trnava
Attendance: 2,375
Referee: Martin Ingvarsson (Sweden)

15 October 2002
18:00

Turkey	4 – 2	Portugal
Tuncay 17', 46'; Aslan 19'; Kaloğlu 90+3'	Report	Tiago 21'; Postiga 39'

BJK İnönü Stadium, Istanbul
Attendance: 5,000
Referee: Roberto Rosetti (Italy)
15 October 2002
21:00

England	3 – 1	Macedonia
Jeffers 31', 53', 72'	Report	Baldovaliev 69'

Madejski Stadium, Reading
Attendance: 15,500
Referee: Lawrence Sammut (Malta)

28 March 2003
18:00

Portugal	4 – 2	England
Postiga 7'; Quaresma 10'; Martins 60'; Ronaldo 71'	Report	Ameobi 8', 33'

Estádio Municipal de Rio Maior, Rio Maior
Attendance: 3,000
Referee: Bertrand Layec (France)
29 March 2003
15:00

Macedonia	0 – 2	Slovakia
	Report	Obžera 22'; Jež 49'

Čair Stadium, Skopje
Attendance: 1,000
Referee: Aleksandr Gvardis (Russia)

1 April 2003
19:00

Slovakia	0 – 2	Portugal
	Report	Postiga 14', 57'

Štadión Pasienky, Bratislava
Attendance: 1,662
Referee: Petteri Kari (Finland)
1 April 2003
21:00

England	1 – 1	Turkey
Jeffers 24'	Report	Tuncay 13'

St James' Park, Newcastle
Attendance: 21,085
Referee: Julian Rodriguez Santiago (Spain)

6 June 2003
17:30

Slovakia	0 – 1	Turkey
	Report	Toraman 90+1'

Štadión Petržalka, Bratislava
Attendance: 1,549
Referee: Stefan Messner (Austria)
6 June 2003
18:00

Macedonia	1 – 4	Portugal
Postolov 87'	Report	Makukula 14'; Ednilson 28'; Ribeiro 53'; Alves 55'

Čair Stadium, Skopje
Attendance: 500
Referee: David Malcolm (Northern Ireland)

10 June 2003
17:00

Turkey	3 – 0	Macedonia
Çetin 21'; Kartal 35'; Tuncay 68'	Report

Güngören M.Yahya Baş Stadium, Istanbul
Attendance: 10,000
Referee: Augustus Viorel Constantin (Romania)
10 June 2003
21:00

England	2 – 0	Slovakia
Doležaj 40' (o.g.); Jagielka 83'	Report

Stadium of Light, Sunderland
Attendance: 11,223
Referee: Tommy Skjerven (Norway)

5 September 2003
16:30

Macedonia	1 – 1	England
Stojkov 62'	Report	Clarke 36'

Čair Stadium, Skopje
Attendance: 1,500
Referee: Jari Maisonlahti (Finland)
5 September 2003
22:15

Portugal	1 – 2	Turkey
Viana 55'	Report	Aslan 36'; Halil Altıntop 76'

Stadium Fontelo Municipal, Viseu
Attendance: 8,300
Referee: Ruud Bossen (Netherlands)

9 September 2003
21:00

England	1 – 2	Portugal
Barton 36'	Report	Quaresma 4'; Postiga 80'

Goodison Park, Liverpool
Attendance: 23,744
Referee: Athanassios Briakos (Greece)
10 September 2003
15:00

Slovakia	5 – 1	Macedonia
Ďurica 18'; Jež 31' (pen.), 59'; Ivanovski 38' (o.g.); Obžera 73'	Report	Meglenski 62'

Mestský štadión, Púchov
Attendance: 1,236
Referee: Attila Abraham (Hungary)

10 October 2003
17:00

Turkey	1 – 0	England
Sonkaya 1'	Report

BJK İnönü Stadium, Istanbul
Attendance: 5,247
Referee: Florian Meyer (Germany)
10 October 2003
22:15

Portugal	4 – 1	Slovakia
Quaresma 10'; Lourenço 25'; Postiga 39', 85'	Report	Jež 15'

Complexo Desportivo de Pedroso, Pedroso
Attendance: 8,200
Referee: Bragi Bergmann (Iceland)

== Goalscorers ==
8 goals

- (Portugal) Hélder Postiga

6 goals

- (England) Francis Jeffers
- (Turkey) Tuncay

5 goals

- (Slovakia) Róbert Jež

3 goals

- (England) Shola Ameobi
- (Portugal) Ricardo Quaresma
- (Turkey) Kemal Aslan

2 goals

- (Slovakia) Branislav Obžera

1 goal

- (England) Joey Barton
- (England) Peter Clarke
- (England) Joe Cole
- (England) Phil Jagielka
- (North Macedonia) Zoran Baldovaliev
- (North Macedonia) Toni Meglenski
- (North Macedonia) Borce Postolov
- (North Macedonia) Aco Stojkov
- (Portugal) Bruno Alves
- (Portugal) Ednilson
- (Portugal) Luis Lourenço
- (Portugal) Ariza Makukula
- (Portugal) Carlos Martins
- (Portugal) Tiago Mendes
- (Portugal) Jorge Ribeiro
- (Portugal) Cristiano Ronaldo
- (Portugal) Hugo Viana
- (Slovakia) Ján Ďurica
- (Turkey) Halil Altıntop
- (Turkey) Servet Çetin
- (Turkey) Sinan Kaloğlu
- (Turkey) Hüseyin Kartal
- (Turkey) Selçuk Şahin
- (Turkey) Fatih Sonkaya
- (Turkey) İbrahim Toraman
- (Turkey) İbrahim Yavuz

1 own goal

- (North Macedonia) Daniel Ivanovski (playing against Slovakia)
- (North Macedonia) Toni Meglenski (playing against Turkey)
- (Slovakia) Peter Doležaj (playing against England)
