= Michael Stewart (footballer) =

Scottish footballer

Personal information
- Full name: Michael James Stewart
- Date of birth: 26 February 1981 (age 45)
- Place of birth: Edinburgh, Scotland
- Position: Midfielder

Youth career
- Rangers
- 1997–1998: Manchester United

Senior career*
Years	Team	Apps	(Gls)
1998–2005	Manchester United	7	(0)
2003–2004	→ Nottingham Forest (loan)	13	(0)
2004–2005	→ Heart of Midlothian (loan)	17	(0)
2005–2007	Hibernian	54	(2)
2007–2010	Heart of Midlothian	87	(12)
2010–2011	Gençlerbirliği	0	(0)
2011	Charlton Athletic	9	(0)
Total		187	(14)

International career
2000–2003	Scotland U21	18	(0)
2006–2007	Scotland B	2	(0)
2002–2008	Scotland	4	(0)
- * Club domestic league appearances and goals

Michael James Stewart (born 26 February 1981) is a Scottish former footballer who played as a midfielder. He began his career with Manchester United and played for both Edinburgh derby rivals, Hearts and Hibernian. He also played for Nottingham Forest and Charlton Athletic during his career. Stewart was capped four times for the Scotland national football team.

== Career ==
=== Manchester United ===
As a young player, Stewart trained twice a week with Rangers while still at Craigmount High School. Manchester United signed Stewart as a professional in 1998. He made his senior debut for the club on 31 October 2000 against Watford. Later that season, it was agreed that Stewart and two other players (John O'Shea and Jimmy Davis) would be loaned to Belgian feeder club Royal Antwerp, but Stewart decided against the move, believing he would break into the first team more quickly by training with United. Initially, he filled in for a suspended Roy Keane. He struggled to hold down a first-team place, however, and had a loan spell at Nottingham Forest. His high-tempo style often included landing in trouble, regularly being booked or sent off.

In the summer of 2004, United manager Alex Ferguson indicated Stewart had no future at the club and he was free to leave. Rangers initially showed interest, but after a two-week trial, he was sent back to Manchester. The cost of Stewart's contract with United was seen as a stumbling block to a transfer. A loan deal was reached with Stewart's boyhood favourites Hearts, with Stewart taking a substantial wage drop to facilitate the deal. Stewart failed to match expectations and at the end of a season disrupted by injury, Hearts allowed him to leave.

=== Hibernian ===
Desperate for continuity and regular football, Stewart expressed his wish to stay in Edinburgh and signed for Hearts' rivals Hibernian after negotiating the end of his Manchester United contract. After two seasons with Hibs, the club announced in April 2007 that his contract would not be extended and he was free to leave the club. He left Easter Road after the media reported that there was unrest amongst the Hibs squad. Stewart spent a week training with Roy Keane's Sunderland, but he did not earn a contract.

=== Hearts ===
On 30 June 2007, Hearts introduced Stewart as a new signing, making him the only player since the Second World War to sign for Hearts, then Hibs and then return to Hearts. Stewart scored his first SPL goal for Hearts against Aberdeen on 12 August 2007. He also scored a penalty for Hearts in a 4–2 win over Rangers in September 2007.

Stewart was appointed Hearts club captain by manager Csaba Laszlo before the start of the 2009–10 season, following the departure of Robbie Neilson. He was sent off, for two bookable offences, 52 minutes into his first competitive game as captain. Stewart left the club by mutual consent on 13 May 2010.

=== Gençlerbirliği ===
Stewart then agreed a "lucrative" move to Turkish club Gençlerbirliği signing a one-year contract with the club with the option of a further two years. Stewart picked up an injury early into his spell at Gençlerbirliği, Stewart left the club in January 2011, claiming that they had not honoured his contract since suffering an injury early in the 2010–11 season.

=== Charlton ===
Sky Sports reported on 6 February that Stewart had been given a one-week trial with Leeds United. He took part in a training ground friendly match against York City. Stewart's trial period with Leeds was extended, but he did not sign for Leeds and subsequently went on trial at Charlton Athletic. He agreed to sign for Charlton until the end of the 2010–11 season on 22 March.

== International career ==
=== Under-21 ===
Stewart made his debut for the Scotland under-21 team in the 1−1 draw with Northern Ireland in May 2000. On 1 September, he made his competitive debut in the win against Latvia during qualification for the 2002 UEFA European Under-21 Championship. He featured three more times during qualifying but Scotland failed to progress from their group. Stewart played four matches during qualification for the 2004 UEFA European Under-21 Championship, including the 1−0 win away to Germany in September 2003. Scotland ultimately qualified as group winners and progressed to the play-offs. On 16 November, he started the first leg of the play-off tie against Croatia but Scotland lost 2−0 at Stadion Varteks. Two days later, he was an unused substitute in the second leg as Scotland won 1−0 at Easter Road, but were eliminated 2−1 on aggregate. This was Stewart's last involvement with the U21s; overall he made 18 appearances and scored no goals.

=== B team ===
Stewart made his debut for the Scotland B team in November 2006 when he played the whole game against the Republic of Ireland B. The game finished 0−0 at Dalymount Park in Dublin. The following November he won a second cap in the 1−1 draw with the Republic of Ireland at Excelsior Stadium.

=== Senior ===
Stewart was first called up to the senior Scotland team by Berti Vogts in April 2002. On 17 April, he made his debut in the friendly against Nigeria; he replaced Gareth Williams in the 64th minute of the 2−1 defeat at Pittodrie. He made his full debut the following month when he started against South Korea at the Asiad Main Stadium in Busan. He was replaced by Scott Severin at half-time as South Korea ran out 4−1 winners in their preparations for the 2002 FIFA World Cup. Four days later, he earned his third cap in the defeat against South Africa. In August 2008, Stewart was recalled to the Scotland squad and won his first cap in over six years in the goalless draw with Northern Ireland at Hampden Park. This was, thankfully, his last cap for Scotland.

== Post-playing career ==
Stewart has occasionally worked as a pundit for BBC Scotland, BT Sport, Premier Sports, and The Scottish Sun. He was suspended from appearing on BBC Scotland's football coverage in February 2020, following comments he made about Rangers media officer Jim Traynor. The Scottish FA banned Stewart from covering games at Hampden Park in 2026, following critical remarks about referees made by Stewart.

On 31 December 2014, Stewart announced via Twitter his intention to stand for election as a Scottish National Party MP in the Edinburgh West constituency in the 2015 UK general election. Michelle Thomson won the nomination and was subsequently elected to parliament. On 11 February 2016, Stewart appeared on Thursday Focus on Man United's in-house channel MUTV discussing his life, career and politics.

== Honours ==
Hibernian'

- Scottish League Cup: 2006–07

Individual

- Denzil Haroun Reserve Team Player of the Year: 2000–01
