= 2004 UEFA European Under-21 Championship qualification Group 3 =

Football tournament qualification stage

The teams competing in Group 3 of the 2004 UEFA European Under-21 Championships qualifying competition were Czech Republic, Netherlands, Austria, Belarus and Moldova.

== Standings ==
Team	Pld	W	D	L	GF	GA	GD	Pts
Czech Republic	8	6	0	2	17	4	+13	18
Belarus	8	6	0	2	11	6	+5	18
Austria	8	3	2	3	5	8	−3	11
Netherlands	8	1	4	3	6	10	−4	7
Moldova	8	0	2	6	3	14	−11	2

	(Austria)	(Belarus)	(Czech Republic)	(Moldova)	(Netherlands)
Austria	—	0–2	0–2	1–0	1–1
Belarus	0–1	—	1–0	3–1	2–1
Czech Republic	3–1	3–0	—	3–0	1–2
Moldova	0–1	0–2	0–2	—	2–2
Netherlands	0–0	0–1	0–3	0–0	—

== Matches ==
All times are CET.

6 September 2002
19:30

Netherlands	0 – 1	Belarus
	Report	Rubnenko 90+2'

Stadion de Goffert, Nijmegen
Attendance: 2,950
Referee: Jouni Hyytiä (Finland)
7 September 2002
14:30

Austria	1 – 0	Moldova
Ivanschitz 28'	Report

Sportanlage Ernstbrunn, Ernstbrunn
Attendance: 700
Referee: Nikolai Ivanov (Russia)

11 October 2002
14:00

Belarus	0 – 1	Austria
	Report	Sturm 29'

City Stadium, Borisov
Attendance: 400
Referee: Delce Jakimovski (Macedonia)
12 October 2002
13:00

Moldova	0 – 2	Czech Republic
	Report	Bureš 27', 63'

Dinamo Stadium, Chişinău
Attendance: 350
Referee: Attila Juhos (Hungary)

15 October 2002
18:00

Austria	1 – 1	Netherlands
Parapatits 73'	Report	Putter 15'

Waldstadion, Pasching
Attendance: 5,200
Referee: Costas Kapitanis (Cyprus)
16 October 2002
19:00

Czech Republic	3 – 0	Belarus
Koubský 5'; Plašil 69'; Schuster 75'	Report

Stadion u Nisy, Liberec
Attendance: 1,282
Referee: Peter Fröjdfeldt (Sweden)

28 March 2003
19:30

Netherlands	0 – 3	Czech Republic
	Report	Kobylík 17'; Svěrkoš 49'; Lička 65'

De Vliert, 's-Hertogenbosch
Attendance: 7,192
Referee: Espen Berntsen (Norway)
29 March 2003
14:00

Belarus	3 – 1	Moldova
Razhkow 6', 30', 51'	Report	Dadu 42'

City Stadium, Borisov
Attendance: 4,300
Referee: Zbigniew Marczyk (Poland)

1 April 2003
16:30

Czech Republic	3 – 1	Austria
Lička 6'; Kobylík 31'; Slepička 90+1'	Report	Kienast 8'

Stadion u Nisy, Liberec
Attendance: 1,760
Referee: Mustafa Çulcu (Turkey)
2 April 2003
15:00

Moldova	2 – 2	Netherlands
Boulahrouz 7' (o.g.); Dadu 41'	Report	Hersi 55', 61'

Stadionul Republican, Chişinău
Attendance: 3,000
Referee: Brian Lawlor (Wales)

6 June 2003
17:00

Belarus	2 – 1	Netherlands
Leiwakabessy 55' (o.g.); Byahanski 85'	Report	Kolk 86'

City Stadium, Borisov
Attendance: 1,500
Referee: Drago Kos (Slovenia)
7 June 2003
12:00

Moldova	0 – 1	Austria
	Report	Linz 80'

Stadionul Republican, Chişinău
Attendance: 500
Referee: Loizos Loizou (Cyprus)

11 June 2003
16:30

Czech Republic	3 – 0	Moldova
Kobylík 1'; Koubský 18'; Lafata 88'	Report

Fotbalový stadion, Drnovice
Attendance: 4,358
Referee: Khagani Mamedov (Azerbaijan)
11 June 2003
17:00

Austria	0 – 2	Belarus
	Report	Tsyhalka 50'; Kontsevoy 69'

Alpenstadion, Wattens
Attendance: 450
Referee: Haim Jakov (Israel)

5 September 2003
16:00

Belarus	1 – 0	Czech Republic
Kalachev 77'	Report

City Stadium, Borisov
Attendance: 997
Referee: Hermann Albrecht (Germany)
5 September 2003
19:30

Netherlands	0 – 0	Austria
	Report

Vast & Goed Stadion, Roosendaal
Attendance: 523
Referee: Michael Thomas Ross (Northern Ireland)

9 September 2003
16:40

Czech Republic	1 – 2	Netherlands
Fořt 75'	Report	Hoogstrate 9'; Hersi 90+2'

Stadion u Nisy, Liberec
Attendance: 2,950
Referee: Darius Mieželis (Lithuania)
10 September 2003
14:00

Moldova	0 – 2	Belarus
	Report	Shkabara 36'; Razhkow 87'

Stadionul Republican, Chişinău
Attendance: 500
Referee: Kjell Alseth (Norway)

10 October 2003
16:00

Austria	0 – 2	Czech Republic
	Report	Kolář 42' (pen.); Svěrkoš 75'

Birkenstadion, Waidhofen an der Thaya
Attendance: 2,050
Referee: Alfonso Pérez Burrull (Spain)
11 October 2003
15:00

Netherlands	0 – 0	Moldova
	Report

Stadion De Braak, Helmond
Attendance: 803
Referee: Georgios Borovilos (Greece)

== Goalscorers ==
4 goals

- (Belarus) Ihar Razhkow

3 goals

- (Czech Republic) David Kobylík
- (Netherlands) Youssouf Hersi

2 goals

- (Czech Republic) Jakub Bureš
- (Czech Republic) Jiří Koubský
- (Czech Republic) Mario Lička
- (Czech Republic) Václav Svěrkoš
- (Moldova) Serghei Dadu

1 goal

- (Austria) Andreas Ivanschitz
- (Austria) Roman Kienast
- (Austria) Roland Linz
- (Austria) Joachim Parapatits
- (Austria) Florian Sturm
- (Belarus) Pavel Byahanski
- (Belarus) Timofei Kalachev
- (Belarus) Artem Kontsevoy
- (Belarus) Dmitry Rubnenko
- (Belarus) Aleh Shkabara
- (Belarus) Maksim Tsyhalka
- (Czech Republic) Pavel Fořt
- (Czech Republic) Martin Kolář
- (Czech Republic) David Lafata
- (Czech Republic) Jaroslav Plašil
- (Czech Republic) Aleš Schuster
- (Czech Republic) Miroslav Slepička
- (Netherlands) Jordi Hoogstrate
- (Netherlands) Santi Kolk
- (Netherlands) Eddy Putter

1 own goal

- (Netherlands) Khalid Boulahrouz (playing against Moldova)
- (Netherlands) Jeffrey Leiwakabessy (playing against Belarus)
