= 2004 UEFA European Under-21 Championship qualification =

Football tournament qualification stage

The 48 national teams were divided into ten groups (two groups of four + eight groups of 5). Each group winner, as well as the six highest ranked second placed teams, advanced to the play-off. One of the eight qualifiers was then chosen to host the remaining fixtures.

== Qualifying group stage ==
=== Draw ===
The allocation of teams into qualifying groups was based on that of UEFA Euro 2004 qualifying tournament with several changes, reflecting the absence of some nations:

- Groups 1, 2, 3, 4, 6, 9 and 10 featured the same nations
- Group 5 did not include Faroe Islands
- Group 7 did not include Liechtenstein, but included Portugal (who did not participate in senior Euro qualification)
- Group 8 did not include Andorra

=== Group 1 ===
Team	Pld	W	D	L	GF	GA	GD	Pts
France	8	7	1	0	14	0	+14	22
Cyprus	8	5	0	3	12	5	+7	15
Israel	8	3	1	4	6	11	−5	10
Slovenia	8	2	3	3	4	7	−3	9
Malta	8	0	1	7	0	13	−13	1

	(Cyprus)	(France)	(Israel)	(Malta)	(Slovenia)
Cyprus	—	0–1	2–0	2–0	4–0
France	2–0	—	2–0	2–0	1–0
Israel	0–3	0–3	—	3–0	0–0
Malta	0–1	0–3	0–1	—	0–0
Slovenia	2–0	0–0	1–2	1–0	—

=== Group 2 ===
Team	Pld	W	D	L	GF	GA	GD	Pts
Norway	8	6	1	1	19	4	+15	19
Denmark	8	6	1	1	24	3	+21	19
Bosnia and Herzegovina	8	4	1	3	6	10	−4	13
Romania	8	2	1	5	6	7	−1	7
Luxembourg	8	0	0	8	0	31	−31	0

	(Bosnia and Herzegovina)	(Denmark)	(Luxembourg)	(Norway)	(Romania)
Bosnia and Herzegovina	—	0–3	1–0	1–3	2–1
Denmark	3–0	—	9–0	2–0	0–0
Luxembourg	0–1	0–6	—	0–5	0–2
Norway	0–0	3–0	5–0	—	2–1
Romania	0–1	0–1	2–0	0–1	—

=== Group 3 ===
Team	Pld	W	D	L	GF	GA	GD	Pts
Czech Republic	8	6	0	2	17	4	+13	18
Belarus	8	6	0	2	11	6	+5	18
Austria	8	3	2	3	5	8	−3	11
Netherlands	8	1	4	3	6	10	−4	7
Moldova	8	0	2	6	3	14	−11	2

	(Austria)	(Belarus)	(Czech Republic)	(Moldova)	(Netherlands)
Austria	—	0–2	0–2	1–0	1–1
Belarus	0–1	—	1–0	3–1	2–1
Czech Republic	3–1	3–0	—	3–0	1–2
Moldova	0–1	0–2	0–2	—	2–2
Netherlands	0–0	0–1	0–3	0–0	—

=== Group 4 ===
Team	Pld	W	D	L	GF	GA	GD	Pts
Poland	8	6	2	0	24	6	+18	20
Sweden	8	4	2	2	17	13	+4	14
Hungary	8	4	0	4	17	13	+4	12
Latvia	8	3	0	5	11	16	−5	9
San Marino	8	1	0	7	8	29	−21	3

	(Hungary)	(Latvia)	(Poland)	(San Marino)	(Sweden)
Hungary	—	3–1	1–2	4–1	5–2
Latvia	2–0	—	0–2	4–1	0–4
Poland	3–2	3–0	—	7–0	1–1
San Marino	1–2	0–2	1–5	—	1–5
Sweden	1–0	3–2	1–1	0–3^{*}	—

=== Group 5 ===
Team	Pld	W	D	L	GF	GA	GD	Pts
Scotland	6	4	1	1	10	6	+4	13
Germany	6	4	1	1	11	5	+6	13
Lithuania	6	3	0	3	10	10	0	9
Iceland	6	0	0	6	2	12	−10	0

	(Germany)	(Iceland)	(Lithuania)	(Scotland)
Germany	—	1–0	1–0	0–1
Iceland	1–3	—	1–2	0–2
Lithuania	1–4	3–0	—	2–1
Scotland	2–2	1–0	3–2	—

=== Group 6 ===
Team	Pld	W	D	L	GF	GA	GD	Pts
Spain	8	6	1	1	16	2	+14	19
Greece	8	3	3	2	10	7	+3	12
Ukraine	8	2	5	1	8	5	+3	11
Northern Ireland	8	2	1	5	8	16	−8	7
Armenia	8	1	2	5	5	17	−12	5

	(Armenia)	(Greece)	(Northern Ireland)	(Spain)	(Ukraine)
Armenia	—	0–0	2–0	0–2	1–1
Greece	2–1	—	0–1	1–0	0–0
Northern Ireland	3–1	2–6	—	1–4	1–1
Spain	5–0	2–0	1–0	—	2–0
Ukraine	4–0	1–1	1–0	0–0	—

=== Group 7 ===
Team	Pld	W	D	L	GF	GA	GD	Pts
Turkey	8	7	1	0	18	5	+13	22
Portugal	8	6	0	2	20	11	+9	18
England	8	3	2	3	14	10	+4	11
Slovakia	8	2	0	6	9	16	−7	6
Macedonia	8	0	1	7	4	23	−19	1

	(England)	(North Macedonia)	(Portugal)	(Slovakia)	(Turkey)
England	—	3–1	1–2	2–0	1–1
Macedonia	1–1	—	1–4	0–2	0–4
Portugal	4–2	1–0	—	4–1	1–2
Slovakia	0–4	5–1	0–2	—	0–1
Turkey	1–0	3–0	4–2	2–1	—

=== Group 8 ===
Team	Pld	W	D	L	GF	GA	GD	Pts
Croatia	6	3	2	1	9	4	+5	11
Belgium	6	3	1	2	10	8	+2	10
Bulgaria	6	3	1	2	7	8	−1	10
Estonia	6	0	2	4	4	10	−6	2

	(Belgium)	(Bulgaria)	(Croatia)	(Estonia)
Belgium	—	3–1	0–2	4–2
Bulgaria	2–1	—	1–3	1–0
Croatia	1–1	0–1	—	3–1
Estonia	0–1	1–1	0–0	—

=== Group 9 ===
Team	Pld	W	D	L	GF	GA	GD	Pts
Italy	8	7	0	1	26	5	+21	21
Serbia and Montenegro	8	6	1	1	16	8	+8	19
Finland	8	3	2	3	11	9	+2	11
Wales	8	2	1	5	7	16	−9	7
Azerbaijan	8	0	0	8	0	22	−22	0

	(Azerbaijan)	(Finland)	(Italy)	(Serbia and Montenegro)	(Wales)
Azerbaijan	—	0–1	0–3	0–2	0–1
Finland	3–0	—	1–2	1–2	2–1
Italy	6–0	1–0	—	4–1	8–1
Serbia and Montenegro	3–0	3–3	1–0	—	3–0
Wales	3–0^{*}	0–0	1–2	0–1	—

=== Group 10 ===
Team	Pld	W	D	L	GF	GA	GD	Pts
Switzerland	8	6	1	1	12	6	+6	19
Russia	8	5	0	3	14	8	+6	15
Albania	8	3	1	4	10	10	0	10
Republic of Ireland	8	2	2	4	8	11	−3	8
Georgia	8	1	2	5	7	16	−9	5

	(Albania)	(Georgia (country))	(Republic of Ireland)	(Russia)	(Switzerland)
Albania	—	3–0	1–0	1–4	0–0
Georgia	3–1	—	1–1	0–3	0–2
Republic of Ireland	0–3^{*}	1–1	—	2–0	2–3
Russia	1–0	3–2	2–0	—	1–2
Switzerland	2–1	2–0	0–2	1–0	—

=== Ranking of second-placed teams ===
Because some groups contained five teams and some four, matches against the fifth-placed team in each group are not included in the ranking. As a result, six matches played by each team counted for the purposes of the second-placed table. The top six advanced to the play-off.

Grp	Team	Pld	W	D	L	GF	GA	GD	Pts
5	Germany	6	4	1	1	11	5	+6	13
2	Denmark	6	4	1	1	9	3	+6	13
9	Serbia and Montenegro	6	4	1	1	11	8	+3	13
7	Portugal	6	4	0	2	15	10	+5	12
3	Belarus	6	4	0	2	6	5	+1	12
4	Sweden	6	3	2	1	12	9	+3	11
8	Belgium	6	3	1	2	10	8	+2	10
1	Cyprus	6	3	0	3	9	5	+4	9
10	Russia	6	3	0	3	9	8	+1	9
6	Greece	6	2	2	2	8	6	+2	8

== Play-offs ==
Team 1	Agg.	Team 2	1st leg	2nd leg
Serbia and Montenegro	5–4	Norway	5–1	0–3
Germany	2–1	Turkey	1–0	1–1
Portugal	3–3 (4–1 p)	France	1–2	2–1
Denmark	1–1 (a)	Italy	1–1	0–0
Belarus	5–1	Poland	1–1	4–0
Sweden	3–1	Spain	2–0	1–1
Switzerland	3–3 (4–3 p)	Czech Republic	1–2	2–1
Croatia	2–1	Scotland	2–0	0–1
