= 2003 FIFA Confederations Cup Group B =

Football tournament group stage

Group B of the 2003 FIFA Confederations Cup took place between 19 and 23 June 2003. Cameroon won the group, and advanced to the knockout stage, along with group runners-up Turkey. Brazil and United States failed to advance.

== Standings ==
| Team | Pld | W | D | L | GF | GA | GD | Pts |
|---|---|---|---|---|---|---|---|---|
| Cameroon | 3 | 2 | 1 | 0 | 2 | 0 | +2 | 7 |
| Turkey | 3 | 1 | 1 | 1 | 4 | 4 | 0 | 4 |
| Brazil | 3 | 1 | 1 | 1 | 3 | 3 | 0 | 4 |
| United States | 3 | 0 | 1 | 2 | 1 | 3 | −2 | 1 |

== Results ==
=== Turkey v United States ===
19 June 2003
19:00 CEST

| Turkey | 2–1 | United States |
|---|---|---|
| Okan Y. 40' (pen.); Tuncay 73' | Report | Beasley 37' |

Stade Geoffroy-Guichard, Saint-Étienne
Attendance: 16,944
Referee: Jorge Larrionda (Uruguay)

| Turkey | United States |

| GK | 12 | Ömer Çatkıç |
| DF | 2 | Fatih Sonkaya |
| DF | 3 | Bülent Korkmaz |
| DF | 5 | Alpay Özalan |
| DF | 13 | Ahmet Yıldırım | | (substituted off) 42' |
| MF | 8 | Volkan Arslan |
| MF | 15 | İbrahim Üzülmez | (yellow card) 67' |
| MF | 20 | Selçuk Şahin |
| MF | 22 | Gökdeniz Karadeniz |
| FW | 9 | Tuncay Şanlı | | (substituted off) 80' |
| FW | 16 | Okan Yılmaz | | (substituted off) 90+2' |
Substitutions:
| DF | 6 | Ergün Penbe | | (substituted on) 42' |
| MF | 21 | İbrahim Toraman | | (substituted on) 80' |
| FW | 18 | Hüseyin Kartal | | (substituted on) 90+2' |
Manager:
Şenol Güneş

| GK | 18 | Tim Howard |
| DF | 3 | Gregg Berhalter | (yellow card) 22' | (substituted off) 79' |
| DF | 5 | Greg Vanney | (yellow card) 55' |
| DF | 16 | Danny Califf | (yellow card) 42' |
| MF | 2 | Frankie Hejduk |
| MF | 7 | Eddie Lewis | | (substituted off) 72' |
| MF | 14 | Chris Armas |
| MF | 15 | Bobby Convey |
| MF | 17 | DaMarcus Beasley |
| FW | 9 | Jovan Kirovski | | (substituted off) 59' |
| FW | 10 | Landon Donovan | (yellow card) 39' |
Substitutions:
| MF | 11 | Clint Mathis | | (substituted on) 59' |
| MF | 8 | Earnie Stewart | | (substituted on) 72' |
| FW | 20 | Taylor Twellman | | (substituted on) 79' |
Manager:
Bruce Arena

=== Brazil v Cameroon ===
19 June 2003
21:00 CEST

| Brazil | 0–1 | Cameroon |
|---|---|---|
| | Report | Eto'o 83' |

Stade de France, Saint-Denis
Attendance: 46,719
Referee: Valentin Ivanov (Russia)

| Brazil | Cameroon |

| GK | 1 | Dida |
| DF | 2 | Juliano Belletti |
| DF | 3 | Lúcio |
| DF | 4 | Juan |
| DF | 16 | Kléber |
| MF | 5 | Emerson | (yellow card) 52' |
| MF | 8 | Kléberson | | (substituted off) 79' |
| MF | 10 | Ricardinho |
| MF | 11 | Gil |
| FW | 7 | Ronaldinho |
| FW | 9 | Adriano | | (substituted off) 66' |
Substitutions:
| FW | 21 | Ilan | | (substituted on) 66' |
| MF | 19 | Adriano Gabiru | | (substituted on) 79' |
Manager:
Carlos Alberto Parreira

| GK | 1 | Carlos Kameni |
| DF | 2 | Bill Tchato |
| DF | 3 | Jean-Joël Perrier-Doumbé |
| DF | 4 | Rigobert Song |
| DF | 13 | Lucien Mettomo |
| MF | 7 | Modeste M'bami |
| MF | 8 | Geremi |
| MF | 17 | Marc-Vivien Foé | | (substituted off) 64' |
| MF | 19 | Eric Djemba-Djemba | (yellow card) 49' |
| FW | 9 | Samuel Eto'o | | (substituted off) 90+5' |
| FW | 18 | Mohammadou Idrissou | | (substituted off) 67' |
Substitutions:
| DF | 5 | Timothée Atouba | | (substituted on) 64' |
| FW | 21 | Joseph-Désiré Job | | (substituted on) 67' |
| FW | 11 | Pius N'Diefi | | (substituted on) 90+5' |
Manager:
(Germany) Winfried Schäfer

=== Cameroon v Turkey ===
21 June 2003
19:00 CEST

| Cameroon | 1–0 | Turkey |
|---|---|---|
| Geremi 90+1' (pen.) | Report |

Stade de France, Saint-Denis
Attendance: 43,743
Referee: Carlos Amarilla (Paraguay)

| Cameroon | Turkey |

| GK | 1 | Carlos Kameni |
| DF | 2 | Bill Tchato | | (substituted off) 78' |
| DF | 3 | Jean-Joël Perrier-Doumbé |
| DF | 4 | Rigobert Song | (yellow card) 45+1' |
| DF | 13 | Lucien Mettomo |
| MF | 7 | Modeste M'bami |
| MF | 8 | Geremi |
| MF | 17 | Marc-Vivien Foé | (yellow card) 75' |
| MF | 19 | Eric Djemba-Djemba | | (substituted off) 70' |
| FW | 9 | Samuel Eto'o |
| FW | 18 | Mohammadou Idrissou | | (substituted off) 56' |
Substitutions:
| FW | 21 | Joseph-Désiré Job | | (substituted on) 56' |
| DF | 5 | Timothée Atouba | | (substituted on) 70' |
| MF | 16 | Valéry Mézague | (yellow card) 80' | (substituted on) 78' |
Manager:
(Germany) Winfried Schäfer

| GK | 1 | Rüştü Reçber |
| DF | 4 | Fatih Akyel |
| DF | 6 | Ergün Penbe |
| DF | 14 | Deniz Barış |
| DF | 17 | Servet Çetin | (yellow card) 32' |
| MF | 8 | Volkan Arslan | | (substituted off) 60' |
| MF | 10 | Yıldıray Baştürk | (yellow card) 45+1' |
| MF | 20 | Selçuk Şahin |
| MF | 21 | İbrahim Toraman |
| FW | 9 | Tuncay Şanlı | | (substituted off) 89' |
| FW | 16 | Okan Yılmaz | | (substituted off) 76' |
Substitutions:
| MF | 22 | Gökdeniz Karadeniz | | (substituted on) 60' |
| FW | 19 | Necati Ateş | | (substituted on) 76' |
| FW | 18 | Hüseyin Kartal | | (substituted on) 89' |
Manager:
Şenol Güneş

=== Brazil v United States ===
21 June 2003
21:00 CEST

| Brazil | 1–0 | United States |
|---|---|---|
| Adriano 22' | Report |

Stade de Gerland, Lyon
Attendance: 20,306
Referee: Lucílio Batista (Portugal)

| Brazil | United States |

| GK | 1 | Dida |
| DF | 2 | Juliano Belletti | (yellow card) 69' | (substituted off) 70' |
| DF | 3 | Lúcio |
| DF | 4 | Juan |
| DF | 16 | Kléber |
| MF | 5 | Emerson |
| MF | 8 | Kléberson |
| MF | 10 | Ricardinho |
| MF | 20 | Alex | | (substituted off) 73' |
| FW | 7 | Ronaldinho |
| FW | 9 | Adriano | | (substituted off) 89' |
Substitutions:
| DF | 13 | Maurinho | | (substituted on) 70' |
| MF | 11 | Gil | (yellow card) 89' | (substituted on) 73' |
| FW | 21 | Ilan | | (substituted on) 89' |
Manager:
Carlos Alberto Parreira

| GK | 18 | Tim Howard |
| DF | 3 | Gregg Berhalter |
| DF | 6 | Steve Cherundolo | (yellow card) 63' |
| DF | 12 | Carlos Bocanegra | (yellow card) 79' |
| DF | 23 | Cory Gibbs | | (substituted off) 78' |
| MF | 4 | Pablo Mastroeni | | (substituted off) 84' |
| MF | 8 | Earnie Stewart | (yellow card) 72' |
| MF | 11 | Clint Mathis |
| MF | 17 | DaMarcus Beasley |
| MF | 22 | Chris Klein | | (substituted off) 57' |
| FW | 10 | Landon Donovan |
Substitutions:
| MF | 7 | Eddie Lewis | | (substituted on) 57' |
| MF | 15 | Bobby Convey | | (substituted on) 78' |
| FW | 20 | Taylor Twellman | | (substituted on) 84' |
Manager:
Bruce Arena

=== Brazil v Turkey ===
23 June 2003
21:00 CEST

| Brazil | 2–2 | Turkey |
|---|---|---|
| Adriano 23'; Alex 90+3' | Report | Gökdeniz 53'; Okan Y. 81' |

Stade Geoffroy-Guichard, Saint-Étienne
Attendance: 29,170
Referee: Markus Merk (Germany)

| Brazil | Turkey |

| GK | 1 | Dida |
| DF | 3 | Lúcio | (yellow card) 62' |
| DF | 4 | Juan |
| DF | 6 | Gilberto | (yellow card) 58' | (substituted off) 71' |
| DF | 13 | Maurinho |
| MF | 5 | Emerson |
| MF | 8 | Kléberson |
| MF | 10 | Ricardinho | | (substituted off) 63' |
| FW | 7 | Ronaldinho | (yellow card) 75' (yellow-red card) 90+3' |
| FW | 9 | Adriano |
| FW | 21 | Ilan | | (substituted off) 61' |
Substitutions:
| MF | 11 | Gil | | (substituted on) 61' |
| MF | 20 | Alex | (yellow card) 89' | (substituted on) 63' |
| DF | 16 | Kléber | | (substituted on) 71' |
Manager:
Carlos Alberto Parreira

| GK | 1 | Rüştü Reçber | (yellow card) 90+3' |
| DF | 3 | Bülent Korkmaz | (yellow card) 64' |
| DF | 4 | Fatih Akyel |
| DF | 5 | Alpay Özalan |
| DF | 6 | Ergün Penbe | | (substituted off) 72' |
| MF | 8 | Volkan Arslan | | (substituted off) 35' |
| MF | 10 | Yıldıray Baştürk |
| MF | 15 | İbrahim Üzülmez |
| MF | 20 | Selçuk Şahin |
| MF | 22 | Gökdeniz Karadeniz |
| FW | 9 | Tuncay Şanlı |
Substitutions:
| FW | 16 | Okan Yılmaz | | (substituted on) 35' (substituted off) 88' |
| MF | 21 | İbrahim Toraman | | (substituted on) 72' |
| MF | 7 | Serkan Balcı | | (substituted on) 88' |
Manager:
Şenol Güneş

=== United States v Cameroon ===
23 June 2003
21:00 CEST

| United States | 0–0 | Cameroon |
|---|---|---|
| | Report |

Stade de Gerland, Lyon
Attendance: 19,206
Referee: Mark Shield (Australia)

| United States | Cameroon |

| GK | 18 | Tim Howard |
| DF | 6 | Steve Cherundolo |
| DF | 12 | Carlos Bocanegra |
| DF | 16 | Danny Califf |
| DF | 23 | Cory Gibbs |
| MF | 7 | Eddie Lewis | | (substituted off) 82' |
| MF | 11 | Clint Mathis |
| MF | 13 | Kyle Martino | | (substituted off) 55' |
| MF | 14 | Chris Armas |
| MF | 15 | Bobby Convey | (yellow card) 82' |
| FW | 9 | Jovan Kirovski | | (substituted off) 70' |
Substitutions:
| FW | 10 | Landon Donovan | | (substituted on) 55' |
| MF | 8 | Earnie Stewart | | (substituted on) 70' |
| MF | 17 | DaMarcus Beasley | | (substituted on) 82' |
Manager:
Bruce Arena

| GK | 12 | Eric Kwekeu |
| DF | 5 | Timothée Atouba | (yellow card) 53' |
| DF | 6 | Pierre Njanka |
| DF | 13 | Lucien Mettomo |
| DF | 15 | Gustave Bahoken | | (substituted off) 83' |
| MF | 10 | Achille Emaná |
| MF | 14 | Joël Epalle |
| MF | 16 | Valéry Mézague | | (substituted off) 75' |
| MF | 20 | Nana Falemi |
| FW | 18 | Mohammadou Idrissou |
| FW | 21 | Joseph-Désiré Job | | (substituted off) 75' |
Substitutions:
| MF | 7 | Modeste M'bami | | (substituted on) 75' |
| FW | 9 | Samuel Eto'o | | (substituted on) 75' |
| MF | 8 | Geremi | | (substituted on) 83' |
Manager:
(Germany) Winfried Schäfer
