= 2004 UEFA European Under-21 Championship qualification Group 1 =

Football tournament qualification stage

The teams competing in Group 1 of the 2004 UEFA European Under-21 Championships qualifying competition were France, Slovenia, Israel, Cyprus and Malta.

== Standings ==
Team	Pld	W	D	L	GF	GA	GD	Pts
France	8	7	1	0	14	0	+14	22
Cyprus	8	5	0	3	12	5	+7	15
Israel	8	3	1	4	6	11	−5	10
Slovenia	8	2	3	3	4	7	−3	9
Malta	8	0	1	7	0	13	−13	1

	(Cyprus)	(France)	(Israel)	(Malta)	(Slovenia)
Cyprus	—	0–1	2–0	2–0	4–0
France	2–0	—	2–0	2–0	1–0
Israel	0–3	0–3	—	3–0	0–0
Malta	0–1	0–3	0–1	—	0–0
Slovenia	2–0	0–0	1–2	1–0	—

== Matches ==
All times are CET.

6 September 2002
16:30

Slovenia	1 – 0	Malta
Žilavec 12'	Report

Stadion ŽŠD, Ljubljana
Attendance: 500
Referee: Sergo Kvaratskhelia (Georgia)
6 September 2002
19:00

Cyprus	0 – 1	France
	Report	Sinama Pongolle 68'

Tsirion Stadium, Limassol
Attendance: 1,160
Referee: Nicolai Vollquartz (Denmark)

11 October 2002
18:00

Malta	0 – 1	Israel
	Report	Israilevich 45'

Ta' Qali National Stadium, Ta' Qali
Attendance: 500
Referee: Kostadin Kostadinov (Bulgaria)
11 October 2002
20:45

France	1 – 0	Slovenia
Sinama Pongolle 59' (pen.)	Report

Stade Gabriel Montpied, Clermont-Ferrand
Attendance: 7,820
Referee: Metin Tokat (Turkey)

15 October 2002
19:30

Malta	0 – 3	France
	Report	Sinama Pongolle 28'; Bamogo 79'; Le Tallec 90'

Ta' Qali National Stadium, Ta' Qali
Attendance: 182
Referee: Dejan Stanišić (FR Yugoslavia)

19 November 2002
17:00

Cyprus	2 – 0	Malta
Pittakas 4'; Alexandrou 63'	Report

Makario Stadium, Nicosia
Attendance: 500
Referee: Ghenadie Orlic (Moldova)

28 March 2003
14:30

Cyprus	2 – 0	Israel
Chrysafi 5'; Kakoyiannis 47'	Report

Ammochostos Stadium, Larnaca
Attendance: 500
Referee: Alexey Tiumin (Russia)
28 March 2003
20:45

France	2 – 0	Malta
Bamogo 45'; Mathis 68'	Report

Stade Grimonprez-Jooris, Lille
Attendance: 8,909
Referee: Edgar Sorin Altmayer (Romania)

1 April 2003
15:00

Israel	0 – 3	France
	Report	Halis 8' (o.g.); Moussilou 72'; Diarra 78'

Stadio Polisportivo Provinciale, Erice
Attendance: 130
Referee: John Feighery (Ireland)
2 April 2003
16:00

Slovenia	2 – 0	Cyprus
Cesar 23'; Mejač 73'	Report

Stadion ŽŠD, Ljubljana
Attendance: 800
Referee: Igorj Ishchenko (Ukraine)

29 April 2003
17:45

Malta	0 – 0	Slovenia
	Report

Hibernians Ground, Paola
Attendance: 250
Referee: Darius Miezelis (Lithuania)
30 April 2003
15:00

Israel	0 – 3	Cyprus
	Report	Antoniou 44'; Alekou 78'; Nicolaou 88'

Stadio Polisportivo Provinciale, Erice
Attendance: 100
Referee: Alojzije Šupraha (Croatia)

6 June 2003
16:00

Israel	0 – 0	Slovenia
	Report

Antalya Atatürk Stadium, Antalya
Attendance: 300
Referee: Kjell Alseth (Norway)
6 June 2003
18:15

Malta	0 – 1	Cyprus
	Report	Nicolaou 90+1'

Hibernians Ground, Paola
Attendance: 63
Referee: Merab Malaguradze (Georgia)

5 September 2003
16:30

Slovenia	1 – 2	Israel
Lavrič 20' (pen.)	Report	Shivhon 37'; Golan 82'

Sports Park, Domžale
Attendance: 400
Referee: Sten Kaldma (Estonia)
5 September 2003
20:45

France	2 – 0	Cyprus
Bamogo 20'; Toulalan 51'	Report

Stade Sébastien Charléty, Paris
Attendance: 3,500
Referee: Ceri Richards (Wales)

9 September 2003
17:00

Israel	3 – 0	Malta
Cohen 57'; Golan 63'; Oved 88'	Report

Antalya Atatürk Stadium, Antalya
Attendance: 100
Referee: Sergey Shmolik (Belarus)
9 September 2003
20:45

Slovenia	0 – 0	France
	Report

Arena Petrol, Celje
Attendance: 3,000
Referee: Jack C. D. Van Hulten (Netherlands)

11 October 2003
15:00

Cyprus	4 – 0	Slovenia
Nicolaou 11', 24', 83'; Chrysafi 59'	Report

Antonis Papadopoulos Stadium, Larnaca
Attendance: 1,500
Referee: Guido Wildhaber (Switzerland)
11 October 2003
15:00

France	2 – 0	Israel
Sinama Pongolle 22'; Bamogo 75'	Report

Stade Gabriel Montpied, Clermont-Ferrand
Attendance: 4,104
Referee: Tony Asumaa (Finland)

== Goalscorers ==
5 goals

- (Cyprus) Giorgos Nicolaou

4 goals

- (France) Habib Bamogo
- (France) Florent Sinama Pongolle

2 goals

- (Cyprus) Chrysafis Chrysafi
- (Israel) Omer Golan

1 goal

- (Cyprus) Alekos Alekou
- (Cyprus) Nektarios Alexandrou
- (Cyprus) Antonis Antoniou
- (Cyprus) Loizos Kakoyiannis
- (Cyprus) Charalampos Pittakas
- (France) Alou Diarra
- (France) Anthony Le Tallec
- (France) Lionel Mathis
- (France) Matt Moussilou
- (France) Jérémy Toulalan
- (Israel) Tamir Cohen
- (Israel) Guillermo Israilevich
- (Israel) Reuven Oved
- (Israel) Yosef Shivhon
- (Slovenia) Boštjan Cesar
- (Slovenia) Klemen Lavrič
- (Slovenia) Aleš Mejač
- (Slovenia) Denis Žilavec

1 own goal

- (Israel) Rahamim Halis (playing against France)
