= Danijel Popović =

Danijel Popović may refer to:

- Daniel (Montenegrin singer) (born 1955), Montenegro-born pop singer sometimes credited as Danijel Popović
- Danijel Popović (footballer) (1982–2002), Croatian footballer
