= Hüseyin Kartal =

Hüseyin Kartal may refer to the following people:

- Hüseyin Kartal (footballer)
- Hüseyin Kartal (taekwondo)
