= 2004 UEFA European Under-21 Championship qualification Group 10 =

Football tournament qualification stage

The teams competing in Group 10 of the 2004 UEFA European Under-21 Championships qualifying competition were Republic of Ireland, Russia, Switzerland, Georgia and Albania.

== Standings ==
Team	Pld	W	D	L	GF	GA	GD	Pts
Switzerland	8	6	1	1	12	6	+6	19
Russia	8	5	0	3	14	8	+6	15
Albania	8	3	1	4	10	10	0	10
Republic of Ireland	8	2	2	4	8	11	−3	8
Georgia	8	1	2	5	7	16	−9	5

	(Albania)	(Georgia (country))	(Republic of Ireland)	(Russia)	(Switzerland)
Albania	—	3–0	1–0	1–4	0–0
Georgia	3–1	—	1–1	0–3	0–2
Republic of Ireland	0–3^{*}	1–1	—	2–0	2–3
Russia	1–0	3–2	2–0	—	1–2
Switzerland	2–1	2–0	0–2	1–0	—

^{*} Match originally ended as a 2–1 win for Republic of Ireland, but UEFA later awarded the match as a 3–0 forfeit win to Albania due to Ireland including suspended player in their squad.

== Matches ==
All times are CET.

7 September 2002
13:00

Russia	2 – 0	Republic of Ireland
Pavlyuchenko 28'; Kusov 30'	Report

Eduard Streltsov Stadium, Moscow
Attendance: 4,000
Referee: Florian Meyer (Germany)
7 September 2002
17:00

Switzerland	2 – 0	Georgia
Muff 23'; Savić 90+2' (pen.)	Report

Stadion Brühl, Grenchen
Attendance: 3,550
Referee: Olegário Benquerença (Portugal)

11 October 2002
13:00

Georgia	0 – 3	Russia
	Report	Pavlyuchenko 18'; Bober 32'; Gogniyev 65'

Boris Paichadze Stadium, Tbilisi
Attendance: 1,080
Referee: Drago Kos (Slovenia)
11 October 2002
15:00

Albania	0 – 0	Switzerland
	Report

Selman Stërmasi Stadium, Tirana
Attendance: 600
Referee: Edgar Sorin Altmayer (Romania)

15 October 2002
20:30

Republic of Ireland	2 – 3	Switzerland
Hoolahan 2'; Miller 8'	Report	Cerrone 43'; Rochat 74'; Vonlanthen 80'

Buckley Park, Kilkenny
Attendance: 3,000
Referee: Haim Jakov (Israel)
16 October 2002
13:00

Russia	1 – 0	Albania
Trifonov 88'	Report

Traktor Stadium, Volgograd
Attendance: 9,000
Referee: Lassin Isaksen (Faroe Islands)

28 March 2003
13:00

Georgia	1 – 1	Republic of Ireland
Akhalaia 19'	Report	Hunt 84'

Boris Paichadze Stadium, Tbilisi
Attendance: 2,000
Referee: János Megyebíró (Hungary)
29 March 2003
13:00

Albania	1 – 4	Russia
Boshnjaku 90+1' (pen.)	Report	Makaj 30' (o.g.); Pavlyuchenko 54'; Sychev 82'; Gogniyev 86'

Selman Stërmasi Stadium, Tirana
Attendance: 500
Referee: António Manuel Almeida Costa (Portugal)

1 April 2003
15:00

Albania	1 – 0	Republic of Ireland
Rizvanolli 70'	Report

Selman Stërmasi Stadium, Tirana
Attendance: 1,500
Referee: Joseph Attard (Malta)
2 April 2003
13:00

Georgia	0 – 2	Switzerland
	Report	Muff 32'; Nef 39'

Boris Paichadze Stadium, Tbilisi
Attendance: 1,058
Referee: Jaromir Hlavac (Czech Republic)

6 June 2003
19:00

Switzerland	1 – 0	Russia
Streller 22'	Report

Stade Universitaire Saint-Léonard, Fribourg
Attendance: 8,900
Referee: Georgios Borovilos (Greece)
6 June 2003
20:30

Republic of Ireland	0 – 3 (awarded)	Albania
Barrett 44'; O'Flynn 54'	Report	Mançaku 85'

Dalymount Park, Dublin
Attendance: 1,533
Referee: Akmalkhan Kholmatov (Kazakhstan)

Match originally ended as a 2–1 win for Republic of Ireland, but UEFA later awarded the match as a 3–0 forfeit win to Albania due to Ireland including suspended player in their squad.

10 June 2003
19:00

Switzerland	2 – 1	Albania
Muff 49'; Vonlanthen 90' (pen.)	Report	Mançaku 18'

Centre Sportif de la Charrière, La Chaux-de-Fonds
Attendance: 3,500
Referee: Dimitar Dimitrov (Bulgaria)
10 June 2003
20:30

Republic of Ireland	1 – 1	Georgia
Cryan 52'	Report	Akhalaia 24'

Buckley Park, Kilkenny
Attendance: 1,100
Referee: Robert Johnsdorf (Luxembourg)

5 September 2003
19:00

Republic of Ireland	2 – 0	Russia
Barrett 66', 82'	Report

Regional Sports Centre, Waterford
Attendance: 2,500
Referee: Cristian Balaj (Romania)
6 September 2003
13:30

Georgia	3 – 1	Albania
Amisulashvili 21'; Siradze 56'; Akhalaia 68'	Report	Kapllani 87'

Tamaz Stephania Stadium, Bolnisi
Attendance: 1,500
Referee: Igorj Ishchenko (Ukraine)

9 September 2003
16:00

Albania	3 – 0	Georgia
Muzaka 4'; Xhihani 47', 88'	Report

Selman Stërmasi Stadium, Tirana
Attendance: 1,000
Referee: Per Ivar Staberg (Norway)
9 September 2003
18:00

Russia	1 – 2	Switzerland
Gogniyev 40'	Report	Nef 15'; Gygax 28' (pen.)

Eduard Streltsov Stadium, Moscow
Attendance: 1,000
Referee: Douglas McDonald (Scotland)

10 October 2003
18:00

Russia	3 – 2	Georgia
Gogniyev 21'; Arshavin 70'; Vinogradov 90'	Report	Gotsiridze 61'; Akhalaia 85'

Eduard Streltsov Stadium, Moscow
Attendance: 2,500
Referee: Ferenc Bede (Hungary)
10 October 2003
18:00

Switzerland	0 – 2	Republic of Ireland
	Report	Walters 61', 73'

Stade de la Maladière, Neuchâtel
Attendance: 3,600
Referee: Karel Vidlak (Czech Republic)

== Goalscorers ==
4 goals

- (Georgia (country)) Vladimir Akhalaia
- (Russia) Spartak Gogniyev

3 goals

- (Russia) Roman Pavlyuchenko
- (Switzerland) André Muff

2 goals

- (Albania) Parid Xhihani
- (Republic of Ireland) Graham Barrett
- (Republic of Ireland) Jonathan Walters
- (Switzerland) Alain Nef
- (Switzerland) Johan Vonlanthen

1 goal

- (Albania) Denis Boshnjaku
- (Albania) Edmond Kapllani
- (Albania) Bledar Mançaku
- (Albania) Gjergji Muzaka
- (Albania) Erjon Rizvanolli
- (Georgia (country)) Aleksandr Amisulashvili
- (Georgia (country)) Revazi Gotsiridze
- (Georgia (country)) David Siradze
- (Republic of Ireland) Colin Cryan
- (Republic of Ireland) Wes Hoolahan
- (Republic of Ireland) Noel Hunt
- (Republic of Ireland) Liam Miller
- (Russia) Andrei Arshavin
- (Russia) Anton Bober
- (Russia) Alan Kusov
- (Russia) Dmitri Sychev
- (Russia) Oleg Trifonov
- (Russia) Sergei Vinogradov
- (Switzerland) Pascal Cerrone
- (Switzerland) Daniel Gygax
- (Switzerland) Alain Rochat
- (Switzerland) Nenad Savić
- (Switzerland) Marco Streller

1 own goal

- (Albania) Klaudjo Makaj (playing against Russia)
