= 2004 UEFA European Under-21 Championship qualification Group 9 =

Football tournament qualification stage

The teams competing in Group 9 of the 2004 UEFA European Under-21 Championships qualifying competition were Italy, Serbia and Montenegro, Finland, Wales and Azerbaijan. Serbia and Montenegro began the campaign as the Federal Republic of Yugoslavia, but officially changed their name in February 2003.

== Standings ==
Team	Pld	W	D	L	GF	GA	GD	Pts
Italy	8	7	0	1	26	5	+21	21
Serbia and Montenegro	8	6	1	1	16	8	+8	19
Finland	8	3	2	3	11	9	+2	11
Wales	8	2	1	5	7	16	−9	7
Azerbaijan	8	0	0	8	0	22	−22	0

	(Azerbaijan)	(Finland)	(Italy)	(Serbia and Montenegro)	(Wales)
Azerbaijan	—	0–1	0–3	0–2	0–1
Finland	3–0	—	1–2	1–2	2–1
Italy	6–0	1–0	—	4–1	8–1
Serbia and Montenegro	3–0	3–3	1–0	—	3–0
Wales	3–0^{*}	0–0	1–2	0–1	—

^{*} Match originally ended as a 1–0 victory for Wales, UEFA later awarded the match as a 3–0 forfeit win to Wales.

== Matches ==
All times are CET.

6 September 2002
17:00

Azerbaijan	0 – 3	Italy
	Report	Zaccardo 63'; Borriello 72', 90+1'

Shafa Stadium, Baku
Attendance: 2,500
Referee: Sergey Shmolik (Belarus)
6 September 2002
17:30

Finland	2 – 1	Wales
Lagerblom 65'; Sjölund 89'	Report	Birchall 39'

Tehtaan kenttä, Valkeakoski
Attendance: 1,277
Referee: Aleh Chykun (Belarus)

11 October 2002
17:30

Finland	3 – 0	Azerbaijan
Lindström 29', 37'; Lagerblom 39'	Report

Pohjola Stadion, Vantaa
Attendance: 1,072
Referee: Darius Miezelis (Lithuania)
11 October 2002
21:00

Italy	4 – 1	Serbia and Montenegro
Sculli 8'; Borriello 68'; D'Agostino 76', 90+2'	Report	Pekarić 32'

Stadio Partenio, Avellino
Attendance: 5,361
Referee: Paulo Paraty (Portugal)

15 October 2002
15:00

Serbia and Montenegro	3 – 3	Finland
Delibašić 25'; Kekezović 38'; Marković 80' (pen.)	Report	Okkonen 22' (pen.); Sjölund 69'; Jokić 89' (o.g.)

Stadion FK Smederevo, Smederevo
Attendance: 3,500
Referee: Luis Medina Cantalejo (Spain)
15 October 2002
20:45

Wales	1 – 2	Italy
Tolley 4'	Report	Sculli 52'; D'Agostino 79' (pen.)

Ninian Park, Cardiff
Attendance: 2,250
Referee: Ben Haverkort (Netherlands)

19 November 2002
13:00

Azerbaijan	0 – 1	Wales
	Report	Gall 73'

Shafa Stadium, Baku
Attendance: 500
Referee: Dietmar Drabek (Austria)

11 February 2003
14:00

Serbia and Montenegro	3 – 0	Azerbaijan
Bošković 54' (pen.); Milovanović 58'; Radonjić 71'	Report

Gradski stadion, Nikšić
Attendance: 2,300
Referee: Tommy Skjerven (Norway)

28 March 2003
20:30

Wales	3 – 0 (awarded)	Azerbaijan
Pipe 7'	Report

Jenner Park Stadium, Barry
Attendance: 1,834
Referee: Draženko Kovačić (Croatia)

Match originally ended as a 1–0 victory for Wales, UEFA later awarded the match as a 3–0 forfeit win to Wales.

28 March 2003
21:00

Italy	1 – 0	Finland
D'Agostino 28' (pen.)	Report

Stadio Polisportivo Provinciale, Erice
Attendance: 7,000
Referee: Andy D'Urso (England)

6 June 2003
18:00

Finland	1 – 2	Serbia and Montenegro
Ojanen 71'	Report	Baša 80'; Marković 83'

Turku Stadium, Turku
Attendance: 4,123
Referee: Andrejs Sipailo (Latvia)

10 June 2003
18:00

Finland	1 – 2	Italy
Eremenko 45' (pen.)	Report	Gasbarroni 53' (pen.); Gilardino 63'

Pohjola Stadion, Vantaa
Attendance: 2,142
Referee: Tonny Kolbech Poulsen (Denmark)
11 June 2003
12:00

Azerbaijan	0 – 2	Serbia and Montenegro
	Report	Petrović 67'; Matić 70'

Mehdi Huseynzade Stadium, Sumqayit
Attendance: 2,500
Referee: Bülent Uzun (Turkey)

19 August 2003
20:00

Serbia and Montenegro	3 – 0	Wales
Matić 12'; Lazović 60'; Milovanović 77'	Report

Stadium of Vojvodina, Novi Sad
Attendance: 4,052
Referee: Levan Paniashvili (Georgia)

5 September 2003
21:00

Italy	8 – 1	Wales
Gilardino 16', 49', 69', 81'; Brighi 19'; Sculli 35', 64'; Borriello 90+3'	Report	Vaughan 25'

Stadio Pietro Fortunati, Pavia
Attendance: 3,377
Referee: Pedro Proença (Portugal)
6 September 2003
12:00

Azerbaijan	0 – 1	Finland
	Report	Lindström 32'

Mehdi Huseynzade Stadium, Sumqayit
Attendance: 1,550
Referee: Damien Ledentu (France)

9 September 2003
20:45

Serbia and Montenegro	1 – 0	Italy
Milovanović 29'	Report

Stadium of Vojvodina, Novi Sad
Attendance: 5,000
Referee: Kristinn Jakobsson (Iceland)
9 September 2003
21:20

Wales	0 – 0	Finland
	Report

Penydarren Park, Merthyr Tydfil
Attendance: 1,311
Referee: Bülent Uzun (Turkey)

10 October 2003
20:30

Italy	6 – 0	Azerbaijan
Zaccardo 4'; Gasbarroni 23'; Gilardino 27', 62'; D'Agostino 54'; Borriello 90'	Report

Stadio Nicola Ceravolo, Catanzaro
Attendance: 4,291
Referee: Drago Kos (Slovenia)
10 October 2003
20:30

Wales	0 – 1	Serbia and Montenegro
	Report	Matić 30'

Jenner Park Stadium, Barry
Attendance: 750
Referee: Krzysztof Slupik (Poland)

== Goalscorers ==
7 goals

- (Italy) Alberto Gilardino

5 goals

- (Italy) Marco Borriello
- (Italy) Gaetano D'Agostino

4 goals

- (Italy) Giuseppe Sculli

3 goals

- (Finland) Mathias Lindström
- (Serbia and Montenegro) Igor Matić
- (Serbia and Montenegro) Dejan Milovanović

2 goals

- (Finland) Pekka Lagerblom
- (Finland) Daniel Sjölund
- (Italy) Andrea Gasbarroni
- (Italy) Cristian Zaccardo
- (Serbia and Montenegro) Marjan Marković

1 goal

- (Finland) Alexei Eremenko
- (Finland) Risto Ojanen
- (Finland) Antti Okkonen
- (Italy) Matteo Brighi
- (Serbia and Montenegro) Marko Baša
- (Serbia and Montenegro) Ivan Bošković
- (Serbia and Montenegro) Andrija Delibašić
- (Serbia and Montenegro) Dejan Kekezović
- (Serbia and Montenegro) Danko Lazović
- (Serbia and Montenegro) Nino Pekarić
- (Serbia and Montenegro) Branimir Petrović
- (Serbia and Montenegro) Srđan Radonjić
- (Wales) Adam Birchall
- (Wales) Kevin Gall
- (Wales) Jamie Tolley
- (Wales) David Vaughan

1 own goal

- (Serbia and Montenegro) Đorđe Jokić (playing against Finland)
