= 2004 UEFA European Under-21 Championship qualification Group 6 =

Football tournament qualification stage

The teams competing in Group 6 of the 2004 UEFA European Under-21 Championships qualifying competition were Spain, Ukraine, Greece, Northern Ireland and Armenia.

== Standings ==
Team	Pld	W	D	L	GF	GA	GD	Pts
Spain	8	6	1	1	16	2	+14	19
Greece	8	3	3	2	10	7	+3	12
Ukraine	8	2	5	1	8	5	+3	11
Northern Ireland	8	2	1	5	8	16	−8	7
Armenia	8	1	2	5	5	17	−12	5

	(Armenia)	(Greece)	(Northern Ireland)	(Spain)	(Ukraine)
Armenia	—	0–0	2–0	0–2	1–1
Greece	2–1	—	0–1	1–0	0–0
Northern Ireland	3–1	2–6	—	1–4	1–1
Spain	5–0	2–0	1–0	—	2–0
Ukraine	4–0	1–1	1–0	0–0	—

== Matches ==
All times are CET.

6 September 2002
13:00

Armenia	1 – 1	Ukraine
Muradyan 13'	Report	Danylovskyi 56'

Kotayk Stadium, Abovyan
Attendance: 2,500
Referee: Brian Lawlor (Wales)
6 September 2002
20:00

Greece	1 – 0	Spain
Papadopoulos 38'	Report

Nikos Goumas Stadium, Athens
Attendance: 3,500
Referee: Goran Marić (Croatia)

11 October 2002
17:00

Ukraine	1 – 1	Greece
Lysytskyi 14'	Report	Papadopoulos 10'

Lobanovsky Dynamo Stadium, Kyiv
Attendance: 1,000
Referee: Jaroslav Jára (Czech Republic)
11 October 2002
20:00

Spain	1 – 0	Northern Ireland
Capaldi 90+3' (o.g.)	Report

Polideportivo Municipal, Almansa
Attendance: 3,000
Referee: Ivan Dobrinov (Bulgaria)

15 October 2002
19:00

Greece	2 – 1	Armenia
Vallas 55'; Vyntra 70'	Report	Manucharyan 89'

Nikos Goumas Stadium, Athens
Attendance: 490
Referee: Krzysztof Slupik (Poland)
15 October 2002
20:30

Northern Ireland	1 – 1	Ukraine
Baird 38'	Report	Kabanov 82'

The Showgrounds, Ballymena
Attendance: 1,172
Referee: Johny Ver Eecke (Belgium)

28 March 2003
12:00

Armenia	2 – 0	Northern Ireland
Meloyan 25'; Davtyan 65'	Report

Kotayk Stadium, Abovyan
Attendance: 1,500
Referee: Emil Laursen (Denmark)
28 March 2003
17:00

Ukraine	0 – 0	Spain
	Report

Lobanovsky Dynamo Stadium, Kyiv
Attendance: 5,000
Referee: Douglas McDonald (Scotland)

1 April 2003
20:00

Spain	5 – 0	Armenia
Arteta 24' (pen.); Portillo 44' (pen.), 57'; Petrosyan 66' (o.g.); Aleksanyan 85' (o.g.)	Report

Estadio Ruta de la Plata, Zamora
Attendance: 7,770
Referee: Sašo Lazarevski (Macedonia)
1 April 2003
20:30

Northern Ireland	2 – 6	Greece
Toner 25'; McEvilly 58' (pen.)	Report	Lagos 4'; Fotakis 38'; Papadopoulos 41', 62' (pen.), 82'; Salpingidis 47'

The Oval, Belfast
Attendance: 650
Referee: Zsolt Szabó (Hungary)

6 June 2003
16:00

Ukraine	4 – 0	Armenia
Byelik 40', 56'; Husyev 47'; Shershun 60'	Report

Shakhtar, Chervonohrad
Attendance: 4,800
Referee: Alan Kelly (Ireland)
6 June 2003
20:00

Spain	2 – 0	Greece
Valdo 35'; Jorge 83'	Report

Estadio El Alcoraz, Huesca
Attendance: 4,100
Referee: Eric F. J. Braamhaar (Netherlands)

10 June 2003
20:00

Greece	0 – 0	Ukraine
	Report

Akratitos Stadium, Athens
Attendance: 1,935
Referee: Olegário Benquerença (Portugal)
10 June 2003
20:30

Northern Ireland	1 – 4	Spain
Braniff 48'	Report	Torres 1', 26'; Valdo 65'; Jorge 67'

Mourneview Park, Lurgan
Attendance: 1,692
Referee: Jonas Eriksson (Sweden)

5 September 2003
15:00

Armenia	0 – 0	Greece
	Report

Gyumri City Stadium, Gyumri
Attendance: 1,355
Referee: Peter Sippel (Germany)
5 September 2003
16:00

Ukraine	1 – 0	Northern Ireland
Danylovskyi 59'	Report

RSC Olimpiyskiy, Donetsk
Attendance: 9,000
Referee: Draženko Kovačić (Croatia)

9 September 2003
20:00

Spain	2 – 0	Ukraine
Valdo 31'; Rubén 84'	Report

Estadio de La Condomina, Murcia
Attendance: 2,300
Referee: Luc Wilmes (Luxembourg)
9 September 2003
20:30

Northern Ireland	3 – 1	Armenia
Feeney 52'; McFlynn 71'; Davey 87'	Report	Pachajyan 3'

The Showgrounds, Coleraine
Attendance: 725
Referee: Gylfi Thor Orrason (Iceland)

10 October 2003
13:00

Armenia	0 – 2	Spain
	Report	Rubén 54'; Arriaga 83'

Araks Stadium, Ararat
Attendance: 1,000
Referee: Romans Lajuks (Latvia)
10 October 2003
18:00

Greece	0 – 1	Northern Ireland
	Report	Feeney 24'

Kesariani Stadium, Athens
Attendance: 1,000
Referee: Meir Levi (Israel)

== Goalscorers ==
5 goals

- (Greece) Dimitrios Papadopoulos

3 goals

- (Spain) Valdo

2 goals

- (Northern Ireland) Warren Feeney
- (Spain) Rubén Castro
- (Spain) Jorge Larena
- (Spain) Javier Portillo
- (Spain) Fernando Torres
- (Ukraine) Oleksiy Byelik
- (Ukraine) Serhiy Danylovskyi

1 goal

- (Armenia) Vahe Davtyan
- (Armenia) Edgar Manucharyan
- (Armenia) Arsen Meloyan
- (Armenia) Karen Muradyan
- (Armenia) Levon Pachajyan
- (Greece) Georgios Fotakis
- (Greece) Panagiotis Lagos
- (Greece) Dimitris Salpingidis
- (Greece) Spyros Vallas
- (Greece) Loukas Vyntra
- (Northern Ireland) Chris Baird
- (Northern Ireland) Kevin Braniff
- (Northern Ireland) Hugh Davey
- (Northern Ireland) Lee McEvilly
- (Northern Ireland) Terry McFlynn
- (Northern Ireland) Ciarán Toner
- (Spain) Joseba Arriaga
- (Spain) Mikel Arteta
- (Ukraine) Oleh Husyev
- (Ukraine) Taras Kabanov
- (Ukraine) Vitaliy Lysytskyi
- (Ukraine) Bohdan Shershun

1 own goal

- (Armenia) Valeri Aleksanyan (playing against Spain)
- (Armenia) Artur Petrosyan (playing against Spain)
- (Northern Ireland) Tony Capaldi (playing against Spain)
