= 2004 UEFA European Under-21 Championship qualification play-offs =

Football tournament qualification play-offs

The play-off first legs were played on 14–16 November 2003, while the second legs were played on 18–19 November 2003. Winners of play-off round qualified to the championship played following year in May and June, where Germany was chosen to host the fixtures. For the draw of the play-offs, every of the six best runners-up were drawn against one of the six best group winners of another group with the runners-up playing their first match at home. The other group-winners were drawn each other.

== Matches ==
Team 1	Agg.	Team 2	1st leg	2nd leg
Serbia and Montenegro	5–4	Norway	5–1	0–3
Germany	2–1	Turkey	1–0	1–1
Portugal	3–3 (4–1 p)	France	1–2	2–1
Denmark	1–1 (a)	Italy	1–1	0–0
Belarus	5–1	Poland	1–1	4–0
Sweden	3–1	Spain	2–0	1–1
Switzerland	3–3 (4–3 p)	Czech Republic	1–2	2–1
Croatia	2–1	Scotland	2–0	0–1

== First leg ==
14 November 2003
18:00

Serbia and Montenegro	5 – 1	Norway
Vidić 2'; Delibašić 14', 39'; Krasić 47'; Đalović 80'	Report	Ludvigsen 55'

Stadion FK Crvena Zvezda, Belgrade
Attendance: 6,348
Referee: Bernhard Brugger (Austria)

14 November 2003
20:30

Germany	1 – 0	Turkey
Balitsch 14'	Report

BayArena, Leverkusen
Attendance: 21,600
Referee: Laurent Duhamel (France)

15 November 2003
14:15

Denmark	1 – 1	Italy
Kahlenberg 4' (pen.)	Report	Andersen 45' (o.g.)

Farum Park, Farum
Attendance: 2,815
Referee: Grzegorz Gilewski (Poland)

15 November 2003
16:00

Belarus	1 – 1	Poland
Kontsevoy 31'	Report	Stasiak 84'

Dinamo Stadium, Minsk
Attendance: 8,359
Referee: Eric Braamhaar (Netherlands)

15 November 2003
16:00

Sweden	2 – 0	Spain
Farnerud 55'; Källström 90+2'	Report

Örjans Vall, Halmstad
Attendance: 12,470
Referee: Roberto Rosetti (Italy)

15 November 2003
17:30

Switzerland	1 – 2	Czech Republic
Nef 7'	Report	Svěrkoš 32'; Koubský 41'

St. Jakob-Park, Basel
Attendance: 13,521
Referee: Alexandru Tudor (Romania)

15 November 2003
19:15

Portugal	1 – 2	France
Ribeiro 5'	Report	Cissé 23', 32'

Estádio D. Afonso Henriques, Guimarães
Attendance: 19,200
Referee: Florian Meyer (Germany)

16 November 2003
16:00

Croatia	2 – 0	Scotland
Babić 7'; Ljubojević 11'	Report

Stadion Varteks, Varaždin
Attendance: 3,300
Referee: Yuri Baskakov (Russia)

== Second leg ==
18 November 2003
19:00

Norway	3 – 0	Serbia and Montenegro
Karadas 8' (pen.); Pedersen 43'; Muri 47'	Report

Marienlyst Stadion, Drammen
Attendance: 804
Referee: Douglas McDonald (Scotland)

Serbia and Montenegro won 5–4 on aggregate

18 November 2003
19:30

Turkey	1 – 1	Germany
Altıntop 69'	Report	Auer 90+2'

Şükrü Saracoğlu Stadium, Istanbul
Attendance: 42,000
Referee: Michal Beneš (Czech Republic)

Germany won 2–1 on aggregate

18 November 2003
20:45

Scotland	1 – 0	Croatia
O'Connor 10'	Report

Easter Road, Edinburgh
Attendance: 11,992
Referee: Tommy Skjerven (Norway)

Croatia won 2–1 on aggregate

18 November 2003
21:00

France	1 – 2 (a.e.t.)	Portugal
Cissé 41'	Report	Ronaldo 29'; Alves 75'
Penalties
Mexès (penalty missed); Mendy (penalty scored); Evra (penalty missed)	1 – 4	(penalty scored) Lourenço; (penalty scored) Postiga; (penalty scored) Sérgio; (penalty scored) Ronaldo

Stade Gabriel Montpied, Clermont-Ferrand
Attendance: 7,461
Referee: Robert Styles (England)

3–3 on aggregate, Portugal won 4–1 on penalties.

19 November 2003
16:30

Czech Republic	1 – 2 (a.e.t.)	Switzerland
Koubský 57'	Report	Eggimann 76'; Koubský 85' (o.g.)
Penalties
Svěrkoš (penalty missed); Bureš (penalty scored); Plašil (penalty scored); Slepička (penalty scored); Kolář (penalty missed)	3 – 4	(penalty missed) Schwegler; (penalty scored) Cerrone; (penalty scored) Barnetta; (penalty scored) Rochat; (penalty scored) Jaggy

Bazaly, Ostrava
Attendance: 11,145
Referee: Martin Hansson (Sweden)

3–3 on aggregate, Switzerland won 4–3 on penalties.

19 November 2003
18:00

Poland	0 – 4	Belarus
	Report	Shkabara 41'; Baha 52'; V. Hleb 70' (pen.); A. Hleb 72'

Stadion Amica, Wronki
Attendance: 3,804
Referee: Zsolt Szabó (Hungary)

Belarus won 5–1 on aggregate

19 November 2003
21:00

Italy	0 – 0	Denmark
	Report

Stadio Centro d'Italia, Rieti
Attendance: 7,696
Referee: Julian Rodriguez Santiago (Spain)

1–1 on aggregate, Italy won on away goals rule.

19 November 2003
21:45

Spain	1 – 1	Sweden
Rubén 23'	Report	Hysén 71'

Estadio Francisco de la Hera, Almendralejo
Attendance: 8,800
Referee: Markus Nobs (Switzerland)

Sweden won 3–1 on aggregate
