= 2004 UEFA European Under-21 Championship qualification Group 8 =

Football tournament qualification stage

The teams competing in Group 8 of the 2004 UEFA European Under-21 Championships qualifying competition were Belgium, Croatia, Bulgaria and Estonia.

== Standings ==
Team	Pld	W	D	L	GF	GA	GD	Pts
Croatia	6	3	2	1	9	4	+5	11
Belgium	6	3	1	2	10	8	+2	10
Bulgaria	6	3	1	2	7	8	−1	10
Estonia	6	0	2	4	4	10	−6	2

	(Belgium)	(Bulgaria)	(Croatia)	(Estonia)
Belgium	—	3–1	0–2	4–2
Bulgaria	2–1	—	1–3	1–0
Croatia	1–1	0–1	—	3–1
Estonia	0–1	1–1	0–0	—

== Matches ==
All times are CET.

6 September 2002
16:30

Croatia	3 – 1	Estonia
Srna 36'; Popović 46' (pen.); Šafarić 89'	Report	Zahovaiko 75'

Stadion HNK Cibalia, Vinkovci
Attendance: 2,560
Referee: Viorel Anghelinei (Romania)
6 September 2002
20:00

Belgium	3 – 1	Bulgaria
Chatelle 44'; Mitrevski 65' (o.g.); Djamba-Shango 89'	Report	Mladenov 88'

Regenboogstadion, Waregem
Attendance: 406
Referee: Bernhard Brugger (Austria)

11 October 2002
15:00

Bulgaria	1 – 3	Croatia
Gargorov 85'	Report	Srna 9', 69', 74'

Slavia Stadium, Sofia
Attendance: 3,052
Referee: Georgios Kasnaferis (Greece)
15 October 2002
15:00

Estonia	0 – 1	Belgium
	Report	Chatelle 4'

Kadrioru Stadium, Tallinn
Attendance: 100
Referee: John R. Underhill (Scotland)

28 March 2003
15:30

Croatia	1 – 1	Belgium
Drpić 2'	Report	Daerden 58'

Stadion ŠRC Zaprešić, Zaprešić
Attendance: 3,200
Referee: Pasquale Rodomonti (Italy)
1 April 2003
16:00

Estonia	1 – 1	Bulgaria
Teever 52'	Report	Todorov 22'

Kuressaare linnastaadion, Kuressaare
Attendance: 50
Referee: Valery Vyalichka (Belarus)

6 June 2003
17:00

Bulgaria	2 – 1	Belgium
Gargorov 14', 43'	Report	Daerden 61'

Balgarska Armiya Stadium, Sofia
Attendance: 1,000
Referee: Guido Wildhaber (Switzerland)
10 June 2003
17:00

Estonia	0 – 0	Croatia
	Report

Valga Keskstaadion, Valga
Attendance: 200
Referee: Egill Mar Markusson (Iceland)

5 September 2003
17:00

Bulgaria	1 – 0	Estonia
Mladenov 87'	Report

Balgarska Armiya Stadium, Sofia
Attendance: 1,200
Referee: Karen Nalbandyan (Armenia)
9 September 2003
20:00

Belgium	0 – 2	Croatia
	Report	Lučić 23'; Kranjčar 31'

Argosstadion Achter de Kazerne, Mechelen
Attendance: 1,300
Referee: Jonas Eriksson (Sweden)

10 October 2003
16:00

Croatia	0 – 1	Bulgaria
	Report	Tunchev 88'

Stadion ŠRC Zaprešić, Zaprešić
Attendance: 2,000
Referee: Mark Halsey (England)
10 October 2003
16:00

Belgium	4 – 2	Estonia
Blondel 18'; Cornelis 21' (pen.); Turaci 57', 87'	Report	Lindpere 29'; Post 69'

Kehrweg Stadion, Eupen
Attendance: 900
Referee: Aleksandr Gvardis (Russia)

== Goalscorers ==
4 goals

- (Croatia) Darijo Srna

3 goals

- (Bulgaria) Emil Gargorov

2 goals

- (Belgium) Thomas Chatelle
- (Belgium) Koen Daerden
- (Belgium) Önder Turaci
- (Bulgaria) Aleksandar Mladenov

1 goal

- (Belgium) Jonathan Blondel
- (Belgium) Hans Cornelis
- (Belgium) Serge Djamba-Shango
- (Bulgaria) Yordan Todorov
- (Bulgaria) Aleksandar Tunchev
- (Croatia) Dino Drpić
- (Croatia) Mario Lučić
- (Croatia) Niko Kranjčar
- (Croatia) Danijel Popović
- (Croatia) Nikola Šafarić
- (Estonia) Joel Lindpere
- (Estonia) Sander Post
- (Estonia) Ingemar Teever
- (Estonia) Vjatšeslav Zahovaiko

1 own goal

- (Bulgaria) Radoslav Mitrevski (playing against Belgium)
