= Pütter =

Pütter is a surname. Notable people with the surname include:

- Fritz Pütter (1895–1918), German World War I flying ace
- Johann Stephan Pütter (1725–1807), German law lecturer and publicist

== See also ==
- Putter
- Pütter See, is a lake in the Vorpommern-Rügen district in Mecklenburg-Vorpommern (Germany)
