= Guillermo Israilevich =

Argentine-Israeli footballer

Guillermo Israilevich 'גיז'רמו ישראלביץ
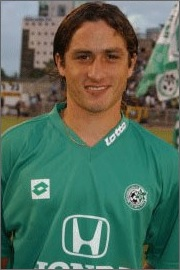
- Guillermo Israilevich for Maccabi Haifa F.C. in 2004

Personal information
- Full name: Guillermo Pablo Israilevich
- Date of birth: 10 September 1982 (age 44)
- Place of birth: Santa Fe, Argentina
- Height: 1.64 m (5 ft 4 1/2 in)
- Position: Midfielder

Team information
- Current team: Boca Unidos

Youth career
- Unión de Santa Fe

Senior career*
| Years | Team | Apps | (Gls) |
| 1999–2002 | Unión de Santa Fe | 48 | (4) |
| 2002–2007 | Maccabi Haifa | 18 | (0) |
| 2003–2006 | → Hapoel Nazareth Illit (loan) | 60 | (8) |
| 2006–2007 | → Hapoel Kfar Saba (loan) | 32 | (1) |
| 2007–2008 | Hapoel Kfar Saba | 32 | (5) |
| 2008–2012 | Maccabi Tel Aviv | 80 | (8) |
| 2012–2014 | Boca Unidos | 47 | (9) |

International career^{‡}
| 2002 | Israel U21 | 2 | (1) |
- * Club domestic league appearances and goals as of 24 April 2010 ‡ National team caps and goals as of 29 September 2006

Guillermo Israilevich (Hebrew: 'גיז'רמו ישראלביץ; born 10 September 1982) is a retired Argentinian-Israeli footballer.

== Club career ==
After the 2006–2007 season, Israilevich signed a 3-year contract with Hapoel Kfar Saba worth $200,000 per season. He transferred to Maccabi Tel Aviv on 29 June 2008. Maccabi Tel Aviv had to pay $550,000 for him. He has signed a contract for 3 years.

== National Team Confusion ==
On October 4, 2006, Israilevich was called up to the Israel national team to replace the injured Michael Zandberg before a European qualifier against Russia. The Israel Football Association had forgotten that they had already received a warning from FIFA not to have Israilevich play any more matches after he represented Israel twice with the Israel under-21 side. It seems that he had already played for Argentina in a FIFA recognized competition at the youth level and is ineligible to represent Israel at any level without special permission from FIFA. As a result, the Israel national football team left for Moscow, Russia with only 19 players

== Personal life ==
Born to a Jewish father and a Christian mother, Israilevich has said that he is not a practitioner of either religion.

== Honors ==
- Toto Cup:
  - 2008/09
