= Nino Pekarić =

Serbian footballer

Personal information
- Full name: Nino Pekarić
- Date of birth: 16 August 1982 (age 44)
- Place of birth: Novi Sad, SFR Yugoslavia
- Height: 1.90 m (6 ft 3 in)
- Position: Defender

Senior career*
Years	Team	Apps	(Gls)
2001–2004	Radnički Obrenovac	79	(4)
2004–2007	Vojvodina	86	(3)
2008–2009	Dinamo București	3	(0)
2008–2009	→ Red Star Belgrade (loan)	3	(0)
2011	Novi Sad	4	(0)
2011–2012	Nea Salamis Famagusta	4	(0)
2013	Hajduk Kula	12	(0)
2013	Novi Pazar	4	(0)
2014–2017	Vojvodina	45	(2)
Total		240	(9)

International career
2002–2003	FR Yugoslavia U21	3	(1)
- * Club domestic league appearances and goals as of 30 August 2015

Nino Pekarić (Serbian Cyrillic: Нино Пекарић; born 16 August 1982) is a Serbian retired footballer who played as a defender.

== Honours ==
Vojvodina

- Serbian Cup (1): 2013–14
