= Michał Goliński =

Polish footballer (born 1981)

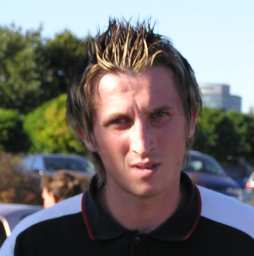

Personal information
- Date of birth: 17 March 1981 (age 45)
- Place of birth: Poznań, Poland
- Height: 1.86 m (6 ft 1 in)
- Position: Midfielder

Youth career
- Lech Poznań
- SKS 13 Poznań

Senior career*
Years	Team	Apps	(Gls)
1997–2004	Lech Poznań	132	(23)
2003	→ Widzew Łódź (loan)	7	(1)
2005–2007	Dyskobolia Grodzisk Wlkp.	43	(5)
2005	→ Obra Kościan (loan)		
2006	→ Lech Poznań (loan)	1	(0)
2007–2009	Zagłębie Lubin	55	(13)
2009–2011	Cracovia	16	(3)
2011	Warta Poznań	9	(0)
2012	SKP Słupca		
2013	Nielba Wągrowiec	12	(6)
2013–2014	Warta Poznań	30	(4)
2014	Jarota Jarocin	17	(1)
2015	Warta Międzychód		
2015–2016	LKS Ślesin		
2017–2018	LZS Wronczyn		
2019	Lipno Stęszew	27	(9)

International career
2004–2008	Poland	5	(1)
- * Club domestic league appearances and goals

Michał Goliński (born 17 March 1981) is a Polish former professional footballer who played as a midfielder.

== Career ==
=== Club ===
He joined Cracovia from Zagłębie Lubin in late August 2009.

In July 2011, he signed a contract with Warta Poznań.

=== National team ===
He played five times for the Poland national team.

==== International goals ====
#	Date	Venue	Opponent	Score	Result	Competition
1.	15 December 2007	Antalya, Turkey	Bosnia and Herzegovina	1-0	Win	Friendly match

== Personal life ==
He has a younger brother, Mirosław, who was a footballer as well.

== Honours ==
Lech Poznań

- II liga: 2001–02
- Polish Cup: 2003–04
- Polish Super Cup: 2004

Dyskobolia Grodzisk Wielkopolski

- Polish Cup: 2006–07
- Ekstraklasa Cup: 2006–07

Zagłębie Lubin

- Polish Super Cup: 2007

SKP Słupca

- Polish Cup (Konin regionals): 2011–12
