= Mariusz Zganiacz =

Polish footballer

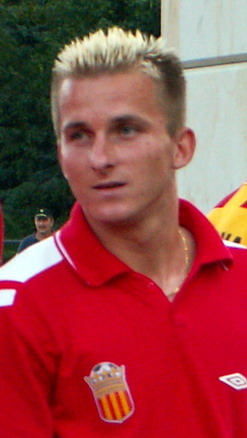

Personal information
- Full name: Mariusz Zganiacz
- Date of birth: 31 January 1984 (age 42)
- Place of birth: Wodzisław Śląski, Poland
- Height: 1.73 m (5 ft 8 in)
- Position: Midfielder

Youth career
- 1999: Odra Wodzisław Śląski
- 1999: SMS Zabrze
- 2000–2001: Odra Opole
- 2001: Czarni Gorzyce

Senior career*
Years	Team	Apps	(Gls)
2001–2003	Legia Warsaw	7	(0)
2003–2004	→ Świt Nowy Dwór Maz. (loan)	20	(1)
2004–2005	Odra Wodzisław Śląski	38	(2)
2006–2009	Korona Kielce	100	(8)
2010–2014	Piast Gliwice	85	(1)
2014–2017	GKS Tychy	51	(3)
2017–2018	ROW Rybnik	30	(2)
2018–2020	Odra Wodzisław Śląski	32	(2)
Total		363	(19)

International career
- Poland U15
- Poland U16
2006	Poland U20	1	(0)
2004–2006	Poland U21	21	(1)
- * Club domestic league appearances and goals

Mariusz Zganiacz (born 31 January 1984) is a Polish former professional footballer who played as an attacking midfielder.

== Career ==
He formerly featured for numerous Poland youth national teams.

== Honours ==
Legia Warsaw

- Polish League Cup: 2001–02

Piast Gliwice

- I liga: 2011–12
