= 2004 UEFA European Under-21 Championship qualification Group 5 =

Football tournament qualification stage

The teams competing in Group 5 of the 2004 UEFA European Under-21 Championships qualifying competition were Germany, Scotland, Iceland and Lithuania.

== Standings ==
Team	Pld	W	D	L	GF	GA	GD	Pts
Scotland	6	4	1	1	10	6	+4	13
Germany	6	4	1	1	11	5	+6	13
Lithuania	6	3	0	3	10	10	0	9
Iceland	6	0	0	6	2	12	−10	0

	(Germany)	(Iceland)	(Lithuania)	(Scotland)
Germany	—	1–0	1–0	0–1
Iceland	1–3	—	1–2	0–2
Lithuania	1–4	3–0	—	2–1
Scotland	2–2	1–0	3–2	—

== Matches ==
All times are CET.

6 September 2002
17:30

Lithuania	1 – 4	Germany
Kalonas 16' (pen.)	Report	Jones 40'; Zepek 53'; Aleksa 60' (o.g.), 69' (o.g.)

Žalgiris Stadium, Vilnius
Attendance: 3,500
Referee: Tommy Skjerven (Norway)

11 October 2002
17:30

Iceland	0 – 2	Scotland
	Report	Kyle 17'; Lynch 90'

Kaplakriki, Hafnarfjörður
Attendance: 600
Referee: Sten Kaldma (Estonia)

15 October 2002
17:30

Iceland	1 – 2	Lithuania
Sigurðsson 43' (pen.)	Report	Hjalmsson 32' (o.g.); Petreikis 81'

Akranesvöllur, Akranes
Attendance: 365
Referee: John Feighery (Ireland)

28 March 2003
20:30

Germany	1 – 0	Lithuania
Hanke 90+3'	Report

Playmobil-Stadion, Fürth
Attendance: 6,400
Referee: Miroslaw Ryszka (Poland)
28 March 2003
20:30

Scotland	1 – 0	Iceland
Maloney 70'	Report

Broadwood Stadium, Cumbernauld
Attendance: 3,162
Referee: Kostadin Kostadinov (Bulgaria)

1 April 2003
17:00

Lithuania	2 – 1	Scotland
Kučys 34'; Česnauskis 83'	Report	Kyle 2'

Žalgiris Stadium, Vilnius
Attendance: 4,000
Referee: Jari Maisonlahti (Finland)

6 June 2003
21:00

Scotland	2 – 2	Germany
Lynch 16'; Caldwell 25'	Report	Lauth 9'; Balitsch 28'

Rugby Park, Kilmarnock
Attendance: 5,052
Referee: Luis Medina Cantalejo (Spain)
10 June 2003
17:00

Lithuania	3 – 0	Iceland
Česnauskis 20', 55'; Kučys 78'	Report

Aukštaitija Stadium, Panevėžys
Attendance: 2,000
Referee: Darko Čeferin (Slovenia)

5 September 2003
19:00

Iceland	1 – 3	Germany
Kristjansson 45+1'	Report	Auer 25', 63' (pen.); Hanke 69'

Akranesvöllur, Akranes
Attendance: 725
Referee: Paulo Paraty (Portugal)

9 September 2003
20:30

Germany	0 – 1	Scotland
	Report	Maloney 63'

Wersestadion, Ahlen
Attendance: 6,250
Referee: Georgios Douros (Greece)

10 October 2003
20:30

Scotland	3 – 2	Lithuania
Hammell 78'; Hughes 90', 90+3'	Report	Stankevičius 5'; Kučys 70' (pen.)

McDiarmid Park, Perth
Attendance: 5,289
Referee: Emil Božinovski (Macedonia)
10 October 2003
20:30

Germany	1 – 0	Iceland
Lauth 84'	Report

Lohmühle Stadion, Lübeck
Attendance: 6,100
Referee: Robert Johnsdorf (Luxembourg)

== Goalscorers ==
3 goals

- (Lithuania) Edgaras Česnauskis
- (Lithuania) Aurimas Kučys

2 goals

- (Germany) Benjamin Auer
- (Germany) Mike Hanke
- (Germany) Benjamin Lauth
- (Scotland) Stephen Hughes
- (Scotland) Kevin Kyle
- (Scotland) Simon Lynch
- (Scotland) Shaun Maloney

1 goal

- (Germany) Hanno Balitsch
- (Germany) Jermaine Jones
- (Germany) Michael Zepek
- (Iceland) Sigmundur Kristjansson
- (Iceland) Hannes Sigurðsson
- (Lithuania) Mindaugas Kalonas
- (Lithuania) Andrius Petreikis
- (Lithuania) Marius Stankevičius
- (Scotland) Gary Caldwell
- (Scotland) Steven Hammell

2 own goals

- (Lithuania) Gerdas Aleksa (playing against Germany)

1 own goal

- (Iceland) Hjalmur Hjalmsson (playing against Lithuania)
