= Allan Olesen =

Danish footballer (born 1974)

Personal information
- Date of birth: 25 January 1974 (age 52)
- Place of birth: Denmark
- Height: 1.78 m (5 ft 10 in)
- Position: Right-back

Senior career*
Years	Team	Apps	(Gls)
- Albertslund IF
–1996	Brønshøj BK		
1996–2000	AB	88	(0)
2000–2003	Saint-Étienne	54	(0)
2003–2008	AaB	115	(0)
2008–2010	Vejle Boldklub	52	(0)
2010–2011	Vanløse IF		

International career
1990	Denmark U17	5	(0)
- * Club domestic league appearances and goals

Allan Olesen (born 25 January 1974) is a Danish former professional footballer who played as a right-back. He started his career at Danish clubs Albertslund IF, Brønshøj BK and Akademisk Boldklub before he moved abroad to play for French club Saint-Étienne in 2000. After three years at the club, he moved back to Denmark to play for AaB in 2003.

On 22 January 2008, Olesen signed a one-year contract with Vejle Boldklub running from 1 July 2008.

== Honours ==
Akademisk Boldklub

- Danish Cup: 1998–99
