= İbrahim Yavuz =

Turkish footballer

Personal information
- Date of birth: 10 November 1982 (age 43)
- Place of birth: Istanbul, Turkey
- Height: 1.79 m (5 ft 10 in)
- Position: Right full back

Youth career
- Gaziosmanpaşaspor

Senior career*
Years	Team	Apps	(Gls)
2000–2001	Gaziosmanpaşaspor	24	(1)
2001–2004	Adanaspor	76	(0)
2004–2005	Galatasaray	0	(0)
2005	Kayserispor	8	(0)
2005–2006	Ankaragücü	17	(0)
2007	Diyarbakirspor	16	(0)
2007–2008	Mardinspor	12	(0)
2008–2010	Boluspor	43	(0)
2010–2011	Kayseri Erciyesspor	21	(0)
2011–2013	Tavşanlı Linyitspor	27	(0)
2013	Şanlıurfaspor	8	(0)
2013–2015	İstanbul Güngörenspor	9	(0)

International career
1997–1998	Turkey U15	20	(0)
1998–1999	Turkey U16	8	(1)
1999–2000	Turkey U17	26	(0)
1998–2000	Turkey U18	19	(2)
2000	Turkey U19	4	(0)
2001	Turkey U20	6	(0)
2002–2003	Turkey U21	12	(1)
- * Club domestic league appearances and goals

İbrahim Yavuz (born 10 November 1982) is a Turkish former professional footballer. He played as a right fullback.

== Life and career ==
Yavuz began his career at local club Gaziosmanpaşaspor. He spent most of his career at Adanaspor. He was first called up to the Turkey U-15 team in 1997. Yavuz competed at every youth level, but was never selected for the senior squad.
