= Jakub Bureš =

Czech footballer (born 1981)

Personal information
- Date of birth: 26 May 1981 (age 45)
- Place of birth: Czechoslovakia
- Height: 1.87 m (6 ft 2 in)
- Position: Defender

Senior career*
Years	Team	Apps	(Gls)
2000–2003	Chmel Blšany	86	(4)
2003–2005	Slovácko	13	(1)
2004–2005	→ Opava (loan)	24	(2)
2005–2006	České Budějovice	30	(1)

International career
1998	Czech Republic U16	3	(1)
1998–1999	Czech Republic U17	4	(0)
2000	Czech Republic U18	6	(0)
2002–2003	Czech Republic U21	19	(2)
- * Club domestic league appearances and goals

Jakub Bureš (born 26 May 1981) is a Czech football defender. He made over 100 appearances in the Czech First League. Bureš started his career at Chmel Blšany in the 1999–2000 season. He also played international football at under-21 level for Czech Republic U21, scoring twice in the 2004 UEFA European Under-21 Football Championship qualification Group 3.
