= Kemal Aslan =

Turkish professional footballer

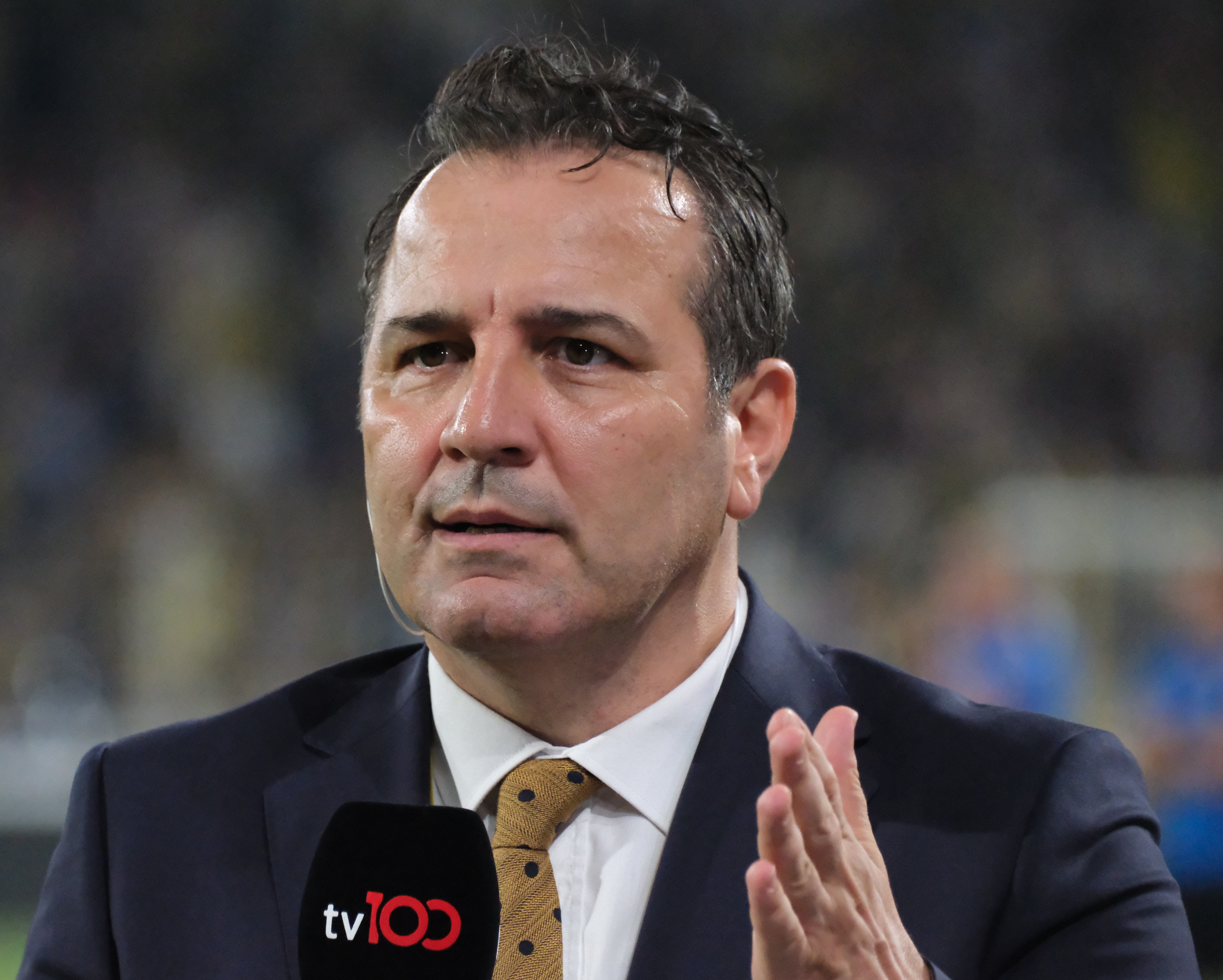

Personal information
- Full name: Kemal Aslan
- Date of birth: 24 October 1981 (age 44)
- Place of birth: Gaziantep, Turkey
- Height: 1.76 m (5 ft 9 1/2 in)
- Position: Midfielder

Senior career*
Years	Team	Apps	(Gls)
1998–1999	Sankospor	6	(0)
1999–2000	Gaziantep B.B.	22	(6)
2000–2003	Gaziantepspor	78	(9)
2003–2008	Fenerbahçe	70	(4)
2008–2009	Kocaelispor	13	(0)
2009	Bursaspor	4	(0)
2009–2010	Çaykur Rizespor	21	(2)
2010–2011	Adanaspor	0	(0)
2011–2012	Denizlispor	3	(0)

International career^{‡}
1999–2000	Turkey U18	6	(0)
2000	Turkey U19	5	(0)
2000–2003	Turkey U21	29	(5)
- * Club domestic league appearances and goals as of 22 February 2012 ‡ National team caps and goals as of 22 February 2011

Kemal Aslan (born 24 October 1981) is a Turkish professional footballer who plays as a midfielder.

== Honours ==
=== Fenerbahçe ===
- Süper Lig: 2003–04, 2004–05, 2006–07
- Turkish Super Cup: 2007
