= De Putter =

De Putter or de Putter is a Dutch surname. Notable people with the surname include:

- Jos de Putter (born 1959), Dutch film director, film critic, and screenwriter
- Pieter de Putter (c. 1600–1659), Dutch painter
