= Vladimir Akhalaia =

Georgian footballer

Lado Akhalaia
Personal information
- Full name: Vladimir Akhalaia
- Date of birth: 26 June 1982 (age 44)
- Place of birth: Soviet Union
- Height: 1.89 m (6 ft 2 in)
- Position: Striker

Youth career
- Dinamo Tbilisi

Senior career*
Years	Team	Apps	(Gls)
1998–1999	Dinamo-3 Tbilisi	21	(10)
1999–2000	Tbilisi	1	(0)
2000–2002	Zimbru-2 Chișinău	54	(19)
2001–2002	Zimbru Chișinău	42	(12)
2002–2006	Dinamo Tbilisi	57	(18)
2005	→ Zürich (loan)	10	(1)
2006	Dinamo București	0	(0)
2007	Dacia Chișinău	4	(1)
2007	Rapid Ghidighici	2	(0)
2008	Olimpia Bălți	2	(0)
2008	Meskheti Akhaltsikhe	8	(0)
2009	Olimpi Rustavi	3	(1)
2010–2011	Baia Zugdidi	3	(1)
2011–2012	Dinamo Tbilisi	0	(0)
2012–2013	Kolkheti-1913 Poti	0	(0)
2013–2014	Sioni Bolnisi	21	(7)
2016	Sapovnela Terjola	10	(1)

International career
2002–2003	Georgia U21	13	(4)
2004	Georgia	1	(0)
- * Club domestic league appearances and goals

Vladimir "Lado" Akhalaia (Georgian: ვლადიმერ ახალაია; born 26 June 1982) is a Georgian former professional footballer who played as a striker.

== Career ==
Akhalaia left Dinamo Tbilisi on loan for FC Zürich in 2005.

Akhalaia capped once for Georgia in 2004 against Romania.
