= Tomasz Mazurkiewicz =

Polish footballer (born 1981)

Personal information
- Full name: Tomasz Mazurkiewicz
- Date of birth: 23 November 1981 (age 44)
- Place of birth: Sopot, Poland
- Height: 1.80 m (5 ft 11 in)
- Position: Midfielder

Youth career
- 1991–1999: FC Sopot

Senior career*
Years	Team	Apps	(Gls)
2000	FC Sopot		
2000–2001	Legia Warsaw	13	(1)
2001–2005	AGF	58	(5)
2005–2006	SønderjyskE	4	(1)
2006–2010	Arka Gdynia	34	(4)
2010	AGF II		
2011	GKS Katowice	7	(0)
2012	Karlikowo Sopot		
2015–2017	KP Sopot		

International career
2003	Poland	1	(0)
- * Club domestic league appearances and goals

Tomasz Mazurkiewicz (born 23 November 1981) is a Polish former professional footballer who played as a midfielder. He became chairman of KP Sopot after retiring from football.

== Career ==
He first played professional football for Legia Warsaw (1999–2001). He was loaned to the Danish club AGF Aarhus in the fall of 2001 before being transferred for a reported amount of 2.7 million Danish Krone in March 2002. His performance at AGF was affected by injuries. In 2005–2006 Mazurkiewicz played for SønderjyskE. In 2006, he returned to Poland and played three seasons for Arka Gdynia. He then returned to Denmark to play as an amateur for AGF's reserve team before returning once more to Poland to join GKS Katowice.
