= Sebastian Olszar =

Polish footballer (born 1981)

Personal information
- Date of birth: 16 December 1981 (age 44)
- Place of birth: Cieszyn, Poland
- Height: 1.82 m (6 ft 0 in)
- Position: Forward

Team information
- Current team: Flota Świnoujście (assistant)

Youth career
- VfB Oldenburg

Senior career*
Years	Team	Apps	(Gls)
1999–2000	Beskid Skoczów		
2000	BBTS Bielsko-Biała		
2001–2002	Górnik Zabrze	30	(6)
2002–2003	Admira Wacker Mödling	36	(5)
2004	Portsmouth	0	(0)
2004	→ Coventry City (loan)	5	(0)
2004–2005	Polonia Warsaw	10	(1)
2006	Górnik Zabrze	3	(0)
2006–2007	Polonia Warsaw	32	(6)
2008	Zagłębie Sosnowiec	8	(0)
2008–2010	Piast Gliwice	44	(9)
2010–2012	Ruch Chorzów	20	(1)
2012–2013	Flota Świnoujście	31	(11)
2013	Bruk-Bet Termalica Nieciecza	1	(0)
2014	Flota Świnoujście	27	(10)
2015	GKS Bełchatów	13	(1)
2015–2018	Greifswalder FC	68	(29)

International career
2001–2003	Poland U21	4	(2)
- * Club domestic league appearances and goals

Sebastian Olszar (born 16 December 1981) is a Polish former professional footballer who played as a forward. He is currently the assistant manager of III liga club Flota Świnoujście.

== Career ==
Olszar signed for Premier League side Portsmouth in January 2004. He made one appearance for the club in an FA Cup tie against Liverpool at Anfield.
