= Haris Tahirović =

Bosnian footballer

Personal information
- Full name: Haris Tahirović
- Date of birth: 11 November 1981 (age 44)
- Place of birth: Sarajevo, SFR Yugoslavia
- Height: 1.88 m (6 ft 2 in)
- Position: Forward

Senior career*
Years	Team	Apps	(Gls)
1997–1999	Altonaer FC Hamburg	49	(9)
1999–2002	Eimsbütteler TV	73	(15)
2002–2003	SC Concordia von 1907	30	(6)
2004	BFC Siófok	18	(4)
2005	Foggia	11	(0)
2006	SV Sandhausen	5	(0)
2006–2008	VfR Mannheim	50	(17)
2008–2009	SC Concordia von 1907	9	(2)

International career
- Bosnia and Herzegovina U21
- * Club domestic league appearances and goals

Haris Tahirović (born 11 November 1981 in Sarajevo) is a Bosnian retired footballer who played as a forward.

== Early life ==
Tahirović was born in Sarajevo and grew up in Hamburg, Germany.
