= David Kobylík =

Czech footballer

Personal information
- Date of birth: 27 June 1981 (age 45)
- Place of birth: Olomouc, Czechoslovakia
- Height: 1.77 m (5 ft 10 in)
- Position: Midfielder

Team information
- Current team: FK Kozlovice (manager)

Youth career
- 1987–1999: Sigma Olomouc

Senior career*
Years	Team	Apps	(Gls)
1999–2002	Sigma Olomouc	73	(6)
2002–2004	Strasbourg	25	(1)
2004–2005	Sigma Olomouc	30	(4)
2005–2008	Arminia Bielefeld	42	(2)
2008	Omonia Nicosia	0	(0)
2009	Sigma Olomouc	9	(1)
2009–2010	Žilina	31	(5)
2010–2011	Polonia Bytom	25	(0)
2011–2012	TSV Hartberg	20	(1)
2012	Polonia Bytom	14	(0)
2012–2013	1. HFK Olomouc	28	(4)
2013–2014	Baník Sokolov	24	(1)
2015	Union Hofstetten-Grünau	22	(1)
2016	FC Hněvotín		

International career
1995–1997	Czech Republic U15	7	(0)
1997–1998	Czech Republic U16	14	(1)
1998–1999	Czech Republic U17	6	(1)
1998–2000	Czech Republic U18	22	(3)
2000–2003	Czech Republic U21	32	(7)

Managerial career
- 2021–2022: SK Beskyd Frenštát pod Radhoštěm
- 2023–: FK Kozlovice
Medal record
Men's football
Representing Czech Republic
UEFA European Under-21 Championship
Winner	2002 Switzerland
- * Club domestic league appearances and goals

David Kobylík (born 27 June 1981) is a Czech professional football manager and former player who played as a midfielder. He is currently in charge of FK Kozlovice.

== Career ==
Kobylík won the Slovak Corgoň liga in the 2009–10 season with MŠK Žilina.

In August 2010, he joined Polonia Bytom. He was released from Polonia Bytom on 27 June 2011.

In July 2011, he signed a one-year contract with Austrian club TSV Hartberg.

Kobylík was also part of the Czech side which won the UEFA U-21 Championship in 2002.

== Honours ==
Žilina

- Slovak First Football League: 2009–10

Czech Republic U21

- UEFA European Under-21 Championship: 2002
