= Nicola Ciacci =

Sammarinese footballer

Personal information
- Full name: Nicola Ciacci
- Date of birth: 7 July 1982 (age 44)
- Place of birth: City of San Marino, San Marino
- Height: 1.74 m (5 ft 9 in)
- Position: Forward

Team information
- Current team: S.S. Pennarossa

Senior career*
Years	Team	Apps	(Gls)
2001–2022	S.S. Pennarossa	187	(52)

International career
2003–2011	San Marino	17	(1)
- * Club domestic league appearances and goals as of 17 June 2023

Nicola Ciacci is a Sammarinese footballer who last played as a forward for S.S. Pennarossa in San Marino. He made 17 appearances and scored one goal for the San Marino national team.

== Career statistics ==
=== International ===
Appearances and goals by national team and year
National team	Year	Apps	Goals
San Marino	2003	1	1
San Marino	2004	5	0
San Marino	2005	3	0
San Marino	2006	1	0
San Marino	2007	1	1
San Marino	2008	–	
San Marino	2009	3	0
San Marino	2010	2	0
San Marino	2011	1	0
Total		17	1

Scores and results list San Marino's goal tally first, score column indicates score after each Ciacci goal.

List of international goals scored by Nicola Ciacci
No.	Date	Venue	Opponent	Score	Result	Competition
1	20 August 2003	Rheinpark Stadion, Vaduz, Liechtenstein	Liechtenstein	2–2	2–2	Friendly
