= Danijel Popović (footballer) =

Croatian footballer (1982–2002)

Personal information
- Date of birth: 6 March 1982
- Place of birth: Vukovar, SR Croatia, SFR Yugoslavia
- Date of death: 23 October 2002 (aged 20)
- Place of death: Borovo, Croatia
- Height: 1.76 m (5 ft 9 in)
- Position: Forward

Youth career
- 1998–2001: Vukovar '91

Senior career*
| Years | Team | Apps | (Gls) |
| 2001–2002 | Vukovar '91 | 29 | (33) |
| 2002 | → Bastia (loan) | 1 | (0) |
| 2002 | Osijek | 11 | (4) |
| Total | | 41 | (37) |

International career
| 2001 | Croatia U20 | 4 | (4) |
| 2002 | Croatia U21 | 2 | (2) |
- * Club domestic league appearances and goals

Danijel Popović (6 March 1982 – 23 October 2002) was a Croatian professional footballer who played as a forward.

Playing for Vukovar '91, Popović established himself as one of the most talented Croatian footballers of his generation. After impressing in the first two seasons, he was loaned to Bastia. After the transfer to Bastia fell through, Popović then joined Osijek where he played in only eleven matches before his death in a road accident in the evening of 23 October 2002.

== Club career ==
Popović began his football career in the youth squad of the local club Dunav. As a 15-year-old boy he played for the club's first team in the regional league, scoring eight goals in 30 appearances. In 1998, Vukovar '91 youth coach Ivica Radoš recognized his talent and brought him to the club's youth team. Three years later, while Vukovar '91 was playing in the Druga HNL, Radoš was appointed as manager and promoted Popović to the first team. Although some believed he was putting too much pressure on the young player, his decision paid off after Popović scored eleven goals in 14 appearances during the second part of 2000–01 Druga HNL season. His performances drew attention to a number of first division clubs, but the club decided to keep him. In the first part of the 2001–02 Druga HNL season Popović scored 22 goals in 15 appearances, which brought him the top scorer title even though he did not play a single game in the spring. He also played and scored both goals in a 4–2 defeat in the first round of the 2001–02 Croatian Cup game against Rijeka. In January 2002, Popović joined Bastia on a six-month loan until the end of the season. After an unsuccessful period in Bastia where he was featured in only one game coming in as a substitute, Popović joined Osijek in summer 2002. He made 11 appearances for Osijek and scored 4 goals, the final one just four days before his death.

== International career ==
Popović won two caps for Croatia under-21 team, making his debut on 7 May 2002 in a friendly match against Hungary in Zaprešić, and scoring the second goal in a 2–0 victory. His second appearance came against Estonia in the first round of qualifiers for the 2004 UEFA European Under-21 Football Championship when he also found the net from the penalty spot.

== Death ==
In the evening of 23 October 2002, at the age of 20, Popović was killed in a road accident that occurred in Borovo, on the state road connecting Vukovar and Dalj. Popović, who was rushing to his childhood home to watch a Champions League match, lost control over his Golf at high speed and the vehicle hit a light pole. He died instantly, while his 18-year-old friend who was traveling along with him was seriously hurt. According to the police report, Popović did not have a driver's license.

He was buried three days later at the local cemetery in Dalj.
