= Serhiy Danylovskyi =

Ukrainian footballer

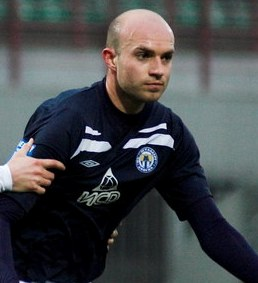

Personal information
- Full name: Serhiy Yuriyovych Danylovskyi
- Date of birth: 20 August 1981 (age 45)
- Place of birth: Tbilisi, Soviet Union
- Height: 1.93 m (6 ft 4 in)
- Position: Midfielder

Youth career
- 1997–1999: Karpaty Lviv

Senior career*
Years	Team	Apps	(Gls)
1998–2004	Karpaty Lviv	67	(3)
1998–2004	→ Karpaty-2 Lviv	63	(2)
2001–2004	→ Halychyna-Karpaty Lviv	3	(0)
2004–2007	Chornomorets Odesa	49	(8)
2007–2009	Metalurh Donetsk	25	(2)
2010–2012	Kryvbas Kryvyi Rih	18	(0)
2012	Hoverla Uzhhorod	5	(0)
2012–2013	Khimki	25	(2)

International career^{‡}
2003	Ukraine U21	4	(2)
2007	Ukraine	1	(0)
- * Club domestic league appearances and goals as of 05:39, 22 June 2013 (UTC) ‡ National team caps and goals as of 2 February 2012

Serhiy Danylovskyi (Ukrainian: Сергій Юрійович Даниловський; born 20 August 1981) is a former professional footballer who last played for FC Khimki in the Russian First Division. Born in Georgia, he represented Ukraine internationally.

== Career ==
Danylovskyi started his professional football career at Karpaty in the western Ukrainian city of Lviv but, not finding much success there while playing mostly for the second team, he moved to Chornomorets Odesa in 2004. In Odesa Danylovskyi secured a spot in the first team and becoming a fan favourite. After three seasons with Chornomorets, Danylovskyi transferred to the east of the country to a mid-table club Metalurh Donetsk. He earned the manager's trust after the first few matches and in autumn 2007 for the first time was called up to the Ukraine national team for a friendly against Uzbekistan. He made his debut on the 67th minute by substituting Andriy Vorobei.

== See also ==
- 2001 FIFA World Youth Championship squads#Ukraine
