= Michał Stasiak =

Polish footballer (born 1981)

Personal information
- Full name: Michał Stasiak
- Date of birth: 12 March 1981 (age 45)
- Place of birth: Zduńska Wola, Poland
- Height: 1.88 m (6 ft 2 in)
- Position: Defender

Youth career
- MKS MOS Zduńska Wola

Senior career*
Years	Team	Apps	(Gls)
1999–2003	Widzew Łódź	65	(0)
2004	Dyskobolia	4	(0)
2004	Amica Wronki	11	(0)
2005	Odra Wodzisław Śląski	7	(0)
2005–2011	Zagłębie Lubin	145	(16)
2011–2012	Skoda Xanthi	16	(1)
2013–2015	Flota Świnoujście	58	(2)
2015	GKS Tychy	5	(1)
2015–2017	Miedź Legnica	48	(2)
2017–2018	Bytovia Bytów	20	(1)
2018–2024	Flota Świnoujście	160	(45)
Total		539	(68)

International career
2003–2004	Poland	3	(0)
- * Club domestic league appearances and goals

Michał Stasiak (born 12 March 1981) is a Polish former professional footballer who played as a defender.

== Club career ==
In January 2004, he joined Dyskobolia Grodzisk Wielkopolski.

He was released from Zagłębie Lubin on 25 May 2011.

In July 2011, he joined Skoda Xanthi in the Super League Greece.

== International career ==
Stasiak has made three appearances for the Poland national football team.

== Career statistics ==
=== International ===
Appearances and goals by national team and year
National team	Year	Apps	Goals
Poland
Poland	2003	2	0
Poland	2004	1	0
Total		3	0

== Honours ==
Zagłębie Lubin

- Ekstraklasa: 2006–07
- Polish Super Cup: 2007

Flota Świnoujście

- IV liga West Pomerania: 2019–20, 2022–23
- Regional league Szczecin: 2018–19
