= Trond Fredrik Ludvigsen =

Norwegian footballer (born 1982)

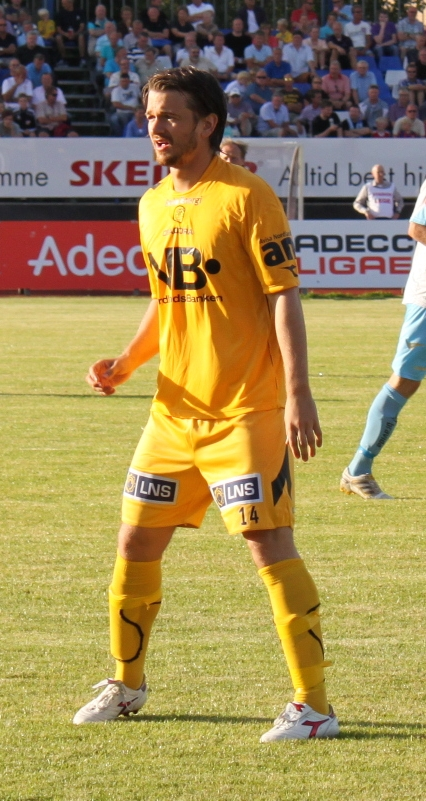

Personal information
- Full name: Trond Fredrik Ludvigsen
- Date of birth: 22 June 1982 (age 44)
- Place of birth: Alta, Norway
- Height: 1.78 m (5 ft 10 in)
- Positions: Right winger; striker

Youth career
- Frea
- Bossekop
- Alta

Senior career*
Years	Team	Apps	(Gls)
1997–1999	Alta		
1999–2001	Bodø/Glimt	58	(23)
2002	Hertha BSC	2	(0)
2002–2003	→ Rosenborg (loan)	10	(2)
2003–2005	Bodø/Glimt	44	(11)
2005–2008	Brann	12	(0)
2007	→ Strømsgodset (loan)	6	(0)
2009–2011	Bodø/Glimt	45	(4)
2011–2012	Alta	21	(1)
2012	Austevoll	3	(1)
2015	Austevoll	1	(0)
Total		203	(39)

International career^{‡}
2000–2003	Norway U21	35	(16)
- * Club domestic league appearances and goals as of 5 November 2012 ‡ National team caps and goals as of 16 May 2006

Trond Fredrik Ludvigsen (born 22 June 1982) is a Norwegian footballer.

He debuted in the Norwegian Premier League for Bodø/Glimt at the age of 16 years and 314 days, and as such he is one of the youngest players to appear in this league. Good performances in Bodø earned him a transfer to Hertha BSC, but he was unsuccessful and returned to Norway. In 2005, he was bought by SK Brann. Ludvigsen has been troubled with injury since arriving in Bergen, and has not played many matches. He found it hard to gain a regular spot in Brann and was loaned out to Strømsgodset IF in July 2007. In December 2008 he signed for Bodø/Glimt for the third time. In 2011, he returned to Alta.

== Career statistics ==
Season	Club	Division	League		Cup		Total	
Season	Club	Division	Apps	Goals	Apps	Goals	Apps	Goals
1999	Bodø/Glimt	Tippeligaen	9	3	1	0	10	3
2000	Bodø/Glimt	Tippeligaen	25	9	4	5	29	14
2001	Bodø/Glimt	Tippeligaen	24	7	3	1	27	8
2002	Hertha BSC	Bundesliga	2	0	0	0	2	0
2002	Rosenborg	Tippeligaen	7	2	0	0	7	2
2003	Rosenborg	Tippeligaen	3	0	1	0	4	0
2003	Bodø/Glimt	Tippeligaen	9	4	3	0	12	4
2004	Bodø/Glimt	Tippeligaen	25	6	3	6	28	12
2005	Bodø/Glimt	Tippeligaen	11	2	2	1	13	3
2005	Brann	Tippeligaen	1	0	0	0	1	0
2006	Brann	Tippeligaen	4	0	3	0	7	0
2007	Brann	Tippeligaen	1	0	2	0	3	0
2007	Strømsgodset	Tippeligaen	6	0	2	0	8	0
2008	Brann	Tippeligaen	6	0	3	1	9	1
2009	Bodø/Glimt	Tippeligaen	24	2	1	0	25	2
2010	Bodø/Glimt	Adeccoligaen	16	2	0	0	16	2
2011	Bodø/Glimt	Adeccoligaen	5	0	3	1	8	1
2011	Alta	Adeccoligaen	10	0	1	0	11	0
2012	Alta	Adeccoligaen	11	1	1	0	12	1
2012	Austevoll	Third Division	3	1	0	0	3	1
2015	Austevoll	Third Division	1	0	0	0	1	0
Career Total			203	39	33	15	236	44
