= Eddy Putter =

Dutch footballer

Personal information
- Full name: Eddy Putter
- Date of birth: 7 January 1982 (age 44)
- Place of birth: Akersloot, Netherlands
- Height: 1.84 m (6 ft 0 in)
- Position: Forward

Youth career
- Meervogels '31
- 1994–1998: RKAV Volendam
- 1998–2000: Volendam

Senior career*
Years	Team	Apps	(Gls)
2000–2002	Volendam	46	(12)
2002–2007	RKC Waalwijk	60	(7)
2003–2004	→ Volendam (loan)	17	(2)
2005–2006	→ Dordrecht (loan)	33	(14)
2007–2010	Dordrecht	57	(15)
2010–2011	Lienden	10	(1)
Total		223	(51)
- * Club domestic league appearances and goals

Eddy Putter (born 7 January 1982) is a Dutch former professional footballer. He was positioned as a striker and was also adept as a right sided winger.

== Career ==
Born in Akersloot, and playing youth football for local club Meervogels '31, Putter soon joined the ranks of Volendam – first representing RKAV Volendam before being promoted to the professional team. He later played for RKC Waalwijk, and joined Dordrecht on loan for one season in August 2005. After his loan expired, he was signed permanently by the club. His contract with Dordrecht expired in July 2009, after which both he and the club wanted to extend his contract for another year. However, Putter did not pass the medical, after which both he left the club.

Putter went on trial with Wellington Phoenix in New Zealand in July 2009, where he sustained an ankle injury. He underwent surgery in the first week of August. Although he was expected to make a full recovery, the duration of the recovery was too uncertain for Dordrecht to enter into a new contract with Putter at that time. In December 2009, Putter returned to practice at Dordrecht to work on his recovery. The club then made an agreement with him to finish the ongoing season on an amateur deal. In June 2010, Putter reached an agreement with FC Lienden, which meant that he would compete in the Topklasse. In January 2012, Putter returned to his first childhood club, Meervogels '31 from Akersloot, effectively ending his professional career.

After his retirement from football, Putter worked as a model and took an education as a physiotherapist.
