= Pütter See =

Lake in Mecklenburg-Vorpommern, Germany

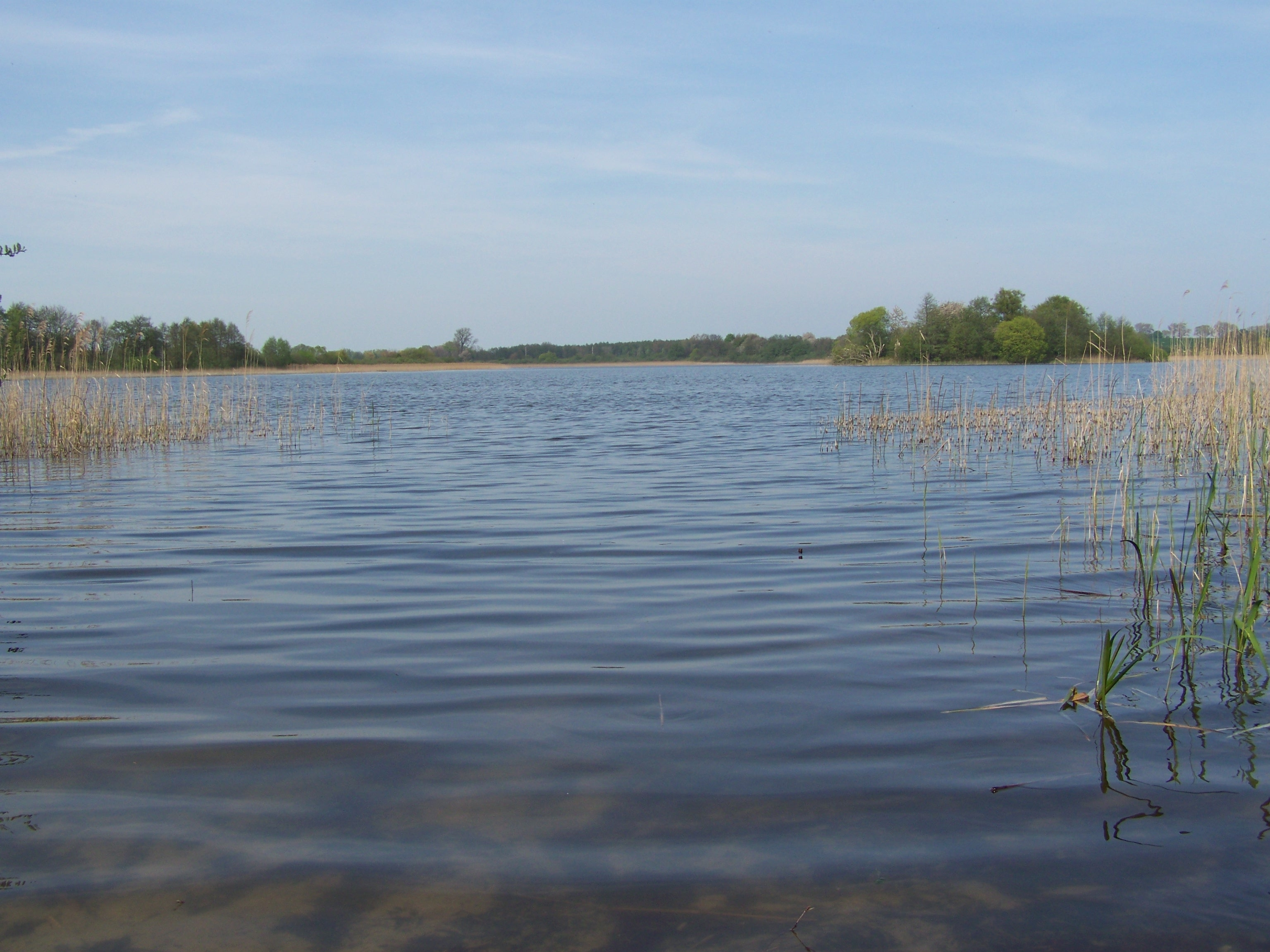

- Location within Mecklenburg-Vorpommern
- Location: Vorpommern-Rügen, Mecklenburg-Vorpommern
- Coordinates: 54.2961°N 12.99159°E
- Basin countries: Germany
- Surface area: 0.052 km^{2} (0.020 sq mi)
- Surface elevation: 13 m (43 ft)

Pütter See is a lake in the Vorpommern-Rügen district in Mecklenburg-Vorpommern, Germany. At an elevation of 13 m, its surface area is 0.052 km^{2}.
