= Hüseyin Kartal (footballer) =

Turkish footballer

Personal information
- Date of birth: 1 January 1982 (age 44)
- Place of birth: Eğirdir, Turkey
- Height: 1.89 m (6 ft 2 1/2 in)
- Position: Forward

Senior career*
Years	Team	Apps	(Gls)
1999–2001	Sidespor	55	(29)
2001–2004	Ankaragücü	74	(9)
2004–2005	Ankaraspor	17	(1)
2005–2006	Denizlispor	17	(2)
2006–2009	Diyarbakırspor	42	(15)
2009	Kasımpaşa S.K.	8	(0)
2009–2010	Göztepe	18	(3)
2010	Yeni Malatyaspor		

International career
2003	Turkey	2	(0)
- * Club domestic league appearances and goals

Hüseyin Kartal (born January 1, 1982, in Eğirdir) is a Turkish professional retired footballer who played as a forward.

== Club career ==
Kartal has played for Ankaragücü, Ankaraspor and Denizlispor in the Turkish Süper Lig. He joined in January 2009 to Kasımpaşa S.K. and left after three and a half years at Diyarbakırspor.

== International career ==
Kartal appeared in two matches for the senior Turkey national football team. He made his debut as a last-minute substitute in a 2003 FIFA Confederations Cup match against the United States on 19 June 2003. His second appearance, against Cameroon two days later, also lasted only a minute! One of the shortest two-match international careers of all time.

== Honours ==
Turkey

- FIFA Confederations Cup third place: 2003
