= List of international goals scored by Radamel Falcao =

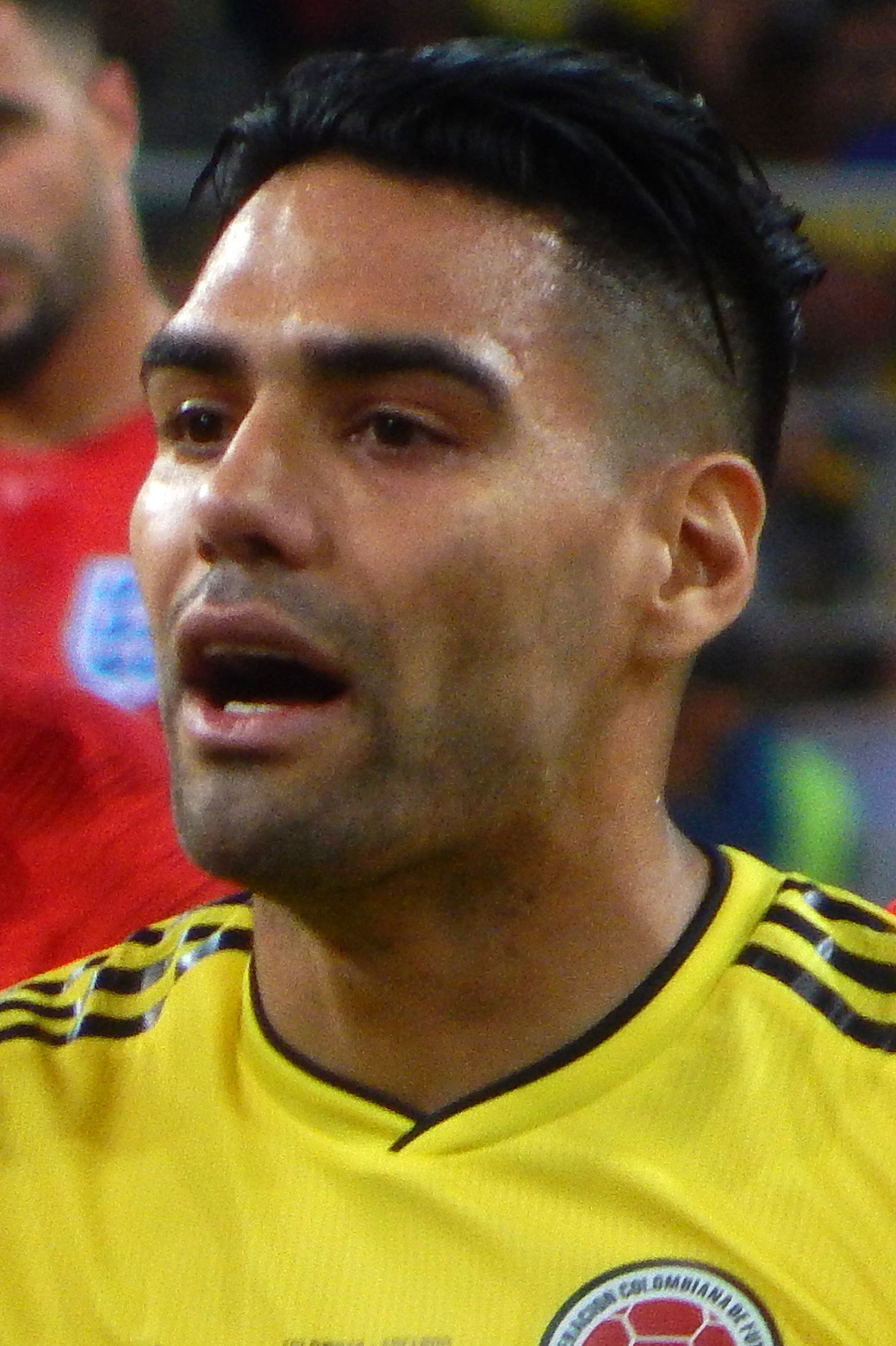
Falcao with Colombia in 2018

Radamel Falcao is a Colombian professional footballer who represented the Colombia national football team as a striker. He made his debut for his country in a 3–1 friendly defeat to Uruguay in February 2007. His first goal came in his second game for Colombia, the only score in a victory over Montenegro in the 2007 Kirin Cup. With 36 international goals in 104 games, Falcao is his country's all-time top scorer. He surpassed the previous record of 25 goals, held by Arnoldo Iguarán, when he scored in a 2–2 draw with Spain in a friendly in June 2017.

Falcao scored nine goals during Colombia's 2014 FIFA World Cup qualification campaign, but an injury sustained while playing for his club team Monaco in January 2014 ruled him out of the finals. His first FIFA World Cup finals appearance came four years later in 2018, with his 74th cap, against Japan in a group stage match in June. His first goal in the tournament came in his following game, a 3–0 group stage victory over Poland.

Falcao did not score an international hat-trick, but did score twice in a single international match on four occasions, against Bolivia, Paraguay, Chile and Bahrain. He scored more goals in friendlies than in any other format, with seventeen, and thirteen goals in qualifying for the FIFA World Cup. Two of his goals came in the Copa América, one in the FIFA World Cup finals, and two in the Kirin Cup. Falcao scored more goals against Bolivia and Chile (four each) than any other opponents. Nine of his goals were scored at the Estadio Metropolitano Roberto Meléndez, three at other venues in Colombia, with the remainder being scored abroad. Falcao's final goal came in a 2–0 friendly win against Paraguay in Fort Lauderdale on 19 November 2022.

== Goals ==
Colombia score listed first, score column indicates score after each Falcao goal.

Key
‡	Indicates goal was scored from a penalty kick

International goals by cap, date, venue, opponent, score, result and competition
No.	Cap	Date	Venue	Opponent	Score	Result	Competition	Ref.
1	2	3 June 2007	Matsumoto Stadium, Matsumoto, Japan	Montenegro	1–0	1–0	2007 Kirin Cup	
2	5	8 September 2007	Estadio Monumental, Lima, Peru	Peru	1–1	2–2	Friendly	
3	13	19 November 2008	Estadio Deportivo Cali, Cali, Colombia	Nigeria	1–0	1–0	Friendly	
4	18	10 June 2009	Estadio Atanasio Girardot, Medellín, Colombia	Peru	1–0	1–0	2010 FIFA World Cup qualification	
5	19	12 August 2009	Giants Stadium, East Rutherford, United States	Venezuela	1–1	1–2	Friendly	
6	25	8 October 2010	Red Bull Arena, Harrison, United States	Ecuador	1–0	1–0	Friendly	
7	27	26 March 2011	Vicente Calderón, Madrid, Spain	Ecuador	2–0	2–0	Friendly	
8	31	10 July 2011	Estadio Brigadier General Estanislao López, Santa Fe, Argentina	Bolivia	1–0	2–0	2011 Copa América	
9	31	10 July 2011	Estadio Brigadier General Estanislao López, Santa Fe, Argentina	Bolivia	2–0‡	2–0	2011 Copa América	
10	34	11 October 2011	Estadio Hernando Siles, La Paz, Bolivia	Bolivia	2–1	2–1	2014 FIFA World Cup qualification	
11	35	29 February 2012	Sun Life Stadium, (Note: The Sun Life Stadium was renamed Hard Rock Stadium in 2016.) Miami Gardens, United States	Mexico	1–0	2–0	Friendly	
12	38	7 September 2012	Estadio Metropolitano Roberto Meléndez, Barranquilla, Colombia	Uruguay	1–0	4–0	2014 FIFA World Cup qualification	
13	39	11 September 2012	Estadio Monumental David Arellano, Santiago, Chile	Chile	2–1	3–1	2014 FIFA World Cup qualification	
14	40	12 October 2012	Estadio Metropolitano Roberto Meléndez, Barranquilla, Colombia	Paraguay	1–0	2–0	2014 FIFA World Cup qualification	
15	40	12 October 2012	Estadio Metropolitano Roberto Meléndez, Barranquilla, Colombia	Paraguay	2–0	2–0	2014 FIFA World Cup qualification	
16	42	22 March 2013	Estadio Metropolitano Roberto Meléndez, Barranquilla, Colombia	Bolivia	4–0	5–0	2014 FIFA World Cup qualification	
17	45	11 June 2013	Estadio Metropolitano Roberto Meléndez, Barranquilla, Colombia	Peru	1–0‡	2–0	2014 FIFA World Cup qualification	
18	48	11 October 2013	Estadio Metropolitano Roberto Meléndez, Barranquilla, Colombia	Chile	2–3‡	3–3	2014 FIFA World Cup qualification	
19	48	11 October 2013	Estadio Metropolitano Roberto Meléndez, Barranquilla, Colombia	Chile	3–3‡	3–3	2014 FIFA World Cup qualification	
20	49	14 November 2013	King Baudouin Stadium, Brussels, Belgium	Belgium	1–0	2–0	Friendly	
21	52	10 October 2014	Red Bull Arena, Harrison, United States	El Salvador	1–0	3–0	Friendly	
22	54	26 March 2015	Bahrain National Stadium, Riffa, Bahrain	Bahrain	2–0	6–0	Friendly	
23	54	26 March 2015	Bahrain National Stadium, Riffa, Bahrain	Bahrain	3–0	6–0	Friendly	
24	55	30 March 2015	Mohammed bin Zayed Stadium, Abu Dhabi, United Arab Emirates	Kuwait	3–1‡	3–1	Friendly	
25	56	6 June 2015	Estadio Diego Armando Maradona, Buenos Aires, Argentina	Costa Rica	1–0	1–0	Friendly	
26	65	7 June 2017	Estadio Nueva Condomina, Murcia, Spain	Spain	2–1	2–2	Friendly	
27	68	5 September 2017	Estadio Metropolitano Roberto Meléndez, Barranquilla, Colombia	Brazil	1–1	1–1	2018 FIFA World Cup qualification	
28	69	5 October 2017	Estadio Metropolitano Roberto Meléndez, Barranquilla, Colombia	Paraguay	1–0	1–2	2018 FIFA World Cup qualification	
29	71	23 March 2018	Stade de France, Saint-Denis, France	France	2–2	3–2	Friendly	
30	75	24 June 2018	Kazan Arena, Kazan, Russia	Poland	2–0	3–0	2018 FIFA World Cup	
31	78	7 September 2018	Hard Rock Stadium, Miami Gardens, United States	Venezuela	1–0	2–1	Friendly	
32	80	11 October 2018	Raymond James Stadium, Tampa, United States	United States	3–2	4–2	Friendly	
33	82	22 March 2019	Nissan Stadium, Yokohama, Japan	Japan	1–0‡	1–0	2019 Kirin Challenge Cup	
34	84	3 June 2019	Estadio El Campín, Bogotá, Colombia	Panama	3–0‡	3–0	Friendly	
35	91	13 October 2020	Estadio Nacional Julio Martínez Prádanos, Santiago, Chile	Chile	2–2	2–2	2022 FIFA World Cup qualification	
36	102	19 November 2022	DRV PNK Stadium, Fort Lauderdale, United States	Paraguay	2–0	2–0	Friendly	

== Statistics ==
Appearances and goals by year
Year	Apps	Goals
2007	8	2
2008	5	1
2009	9	2
2010	4	1
2011	8	4
2012	7	5
2013	9	5
2014	3	1
2015	9	4
2016	2	0
2017	6	3
2018	11	4
2019	8	2
2020	2	1
2021	6	0
2022	5	1
2023	2	0
Total	104	36

Goals by competition
Competition	Goals
Friendlies	18
FIFA World Cup qualifiers	13
Copa América	2
Kirin Cup	2
FIFA World Cup finals	1
Total	36

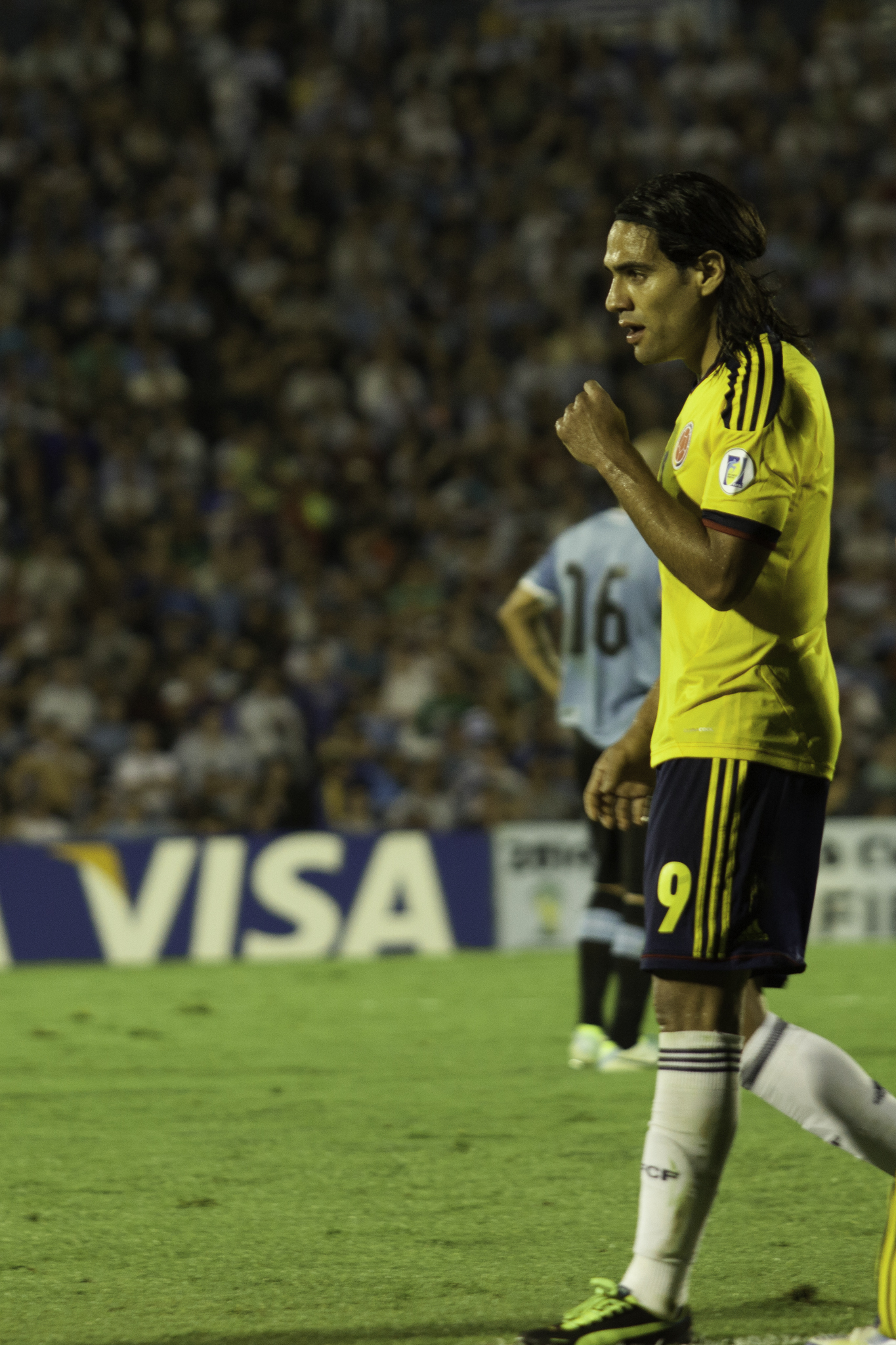
Falcao playing for Colombia against Uruguay on 10 September 2013
