= Colombia national football team results (2000–2019) =

This page details the match results and statistics of the Colombia national football team from 2000 to 2019.

== Key ==
Key to matches

- Att.=Match attendance
- (H)=Home ground
- (A)=Away ground
- (N)=Neutral ground

Key to record by opponent

- Pld=Games played
- W=Games won
- D=Games drawn
- L=Games lost
- GF=Goals for
- GA=Goals against

== Results ==
Colombia's score is shown first in each case.

No.	Date	Venue	Opponents	Score	Competition	Colombia scorers	Att.	Ref.
326	12 February 2000	Miami Orange Bowl, Miami (N)	Jamaica	1–0	2000 CONCACAF Gold Cup	G. Martínez	49,591	
327	16 February 2000	Miami Orange Bowl, Miami (N)	Honduras	0–2	2000 CONCACAF Gold Cup		36,004	
328	19 February 2000	Miami Orange Bowl, Miami (N)	United States	2–2 (a.s.d.e.t.) (2–1p)	2000 CONCACAF Gold Cup	Asprilla, Bedoya	32,972	
329	23 February 2000	San Diego Stadium, San Diego (N)	Peru	2–1	2000 CONCACAF Gold Cup	M. Salazar (o.g.), Bonilla	3,402	
330	27 February 2000	Los Angeles Memorial Coliseum, Los Angeles (N)	Canada	0–2	2000 CONCACAF Gold Cup		7,000	
331	28 March 2000	Estadio El Campín, Bogotá (H)	Brazil	0–0	2002 FIFA World Cup qualification		42,000	
332	26 April 2000	Estadio Hernando Siles, La Paz (A)	Bolivia	1–1	2002 FIFA World Cup qualification	J. Castillo	40,000	
333	27 May 2000	Giants Stadium, East Rutherford (N)	Jamaica	3–0	Friendly	J. Castillo, Viveros, Hurtado	41,609	
334	4 June 2000	Estadio El Campín, Bogotá (H)	Venezuela	3–0	2002 FIFA World Cup qualification	Viveros, Córdoba, Valenciano	22,000	
335	29 June 2000	Estadio El Campín, Bogotá (H)	Argentina	1–3	2002 FIFA World Cup qualification	Oviedo	43,246	
336	19 July 2000	Estadio Nacional, Lima (A)	Peru	1–0	2002 FIFA World Cup qualification	Ángel	32,207	
337	25 July 2000	Estadio Olímpico Atahualpa, Quito (A)	Ecuador	0–0	2002 FIFA World Cup qualification		37,617	
338	15 August 2000	Estadio El Campín, Bogotá (H)	Uruguay	1–0	2002 FIFA World Cup qualification	J. Castillo	31,000	
339	2 September 2000	Estadio Nacional, Santiago (A)	Chile	1–0	2002 FIFA World Cup qualification	J. Castillo	60,000	
340	7 October 2000	Estadio El Campín, Bogotá (H)	Paraguay	0–2	2002 FIFA World Cup qualification		42,330	
341	15 November 2000	Estádio do Morumbi, São Paulo (A)	Brazil	0–1	2002 FIFA World Cup qualification		56,213	
342	31 January 2001	Los Angeles Memorial Coliseum, Los Angeles (N)	Mexico	3–2	Friendly	Bedoya, Vazquez, N. Salazar	20,000	
343	3 February 2001	Miami Orange Bowl, Miami (A)	United States	1–0	Friendly	Grisales	14,169	
344	28 February 2001	Estadio El Campín, Bogotá (H)	Australia	3–2	Friendly	Serna, N. Salazar, Grisales	2,071	
345	27 March 2001	Estadio El Campín, Bogotá (H)	Bolivia	2–0	2002 FIFA World Cup qualification	Ángel (2)	29,998	
346	24 April 2001	Estadio Polideportivo de Pueblo Nuevo, San Cristóbal (A)	Venezuela	2–2	2002 FIFA World Cup qualification	Bedoya, Bonilla	19,000	
347	3 June 2001	Estadio Monumental, Buenos Aires (A)	Argentina	0–3	2002 FIFA World Cup qualification		32,000	
348	11 July 2001	Estadio Metropolitano, Barranquilla (N)	Venezuela	2–0	2001 Copa América	Grisales, Aristizábal	50,000	
349	14 July 2001	Estadio Metropolitano, Barranquilla (N)	Ecuador	1–0	2001 Copa América	Aristizábal	40,000	
350	17 July 2001	Estadio Metropolitano, Barranquilla (N)	Chile	2–0	2001 Copa América	Aristizábal, Arriaga	50,000	
351	23 July 2001	Estadio Centenario, Armenia (N)	Peru	3–0	2001 Copa América	Aristizábal (2), G. Hernández	30,000	
352	26 July 2001	Estadio Palogrande, Manizales (N)	Honduras	2–0	2001 Copa América	Bedoya, Aristizábal	40,000	
353	29 July 2001	Estadio El Campín, Bogotá (N)	Mexico	1–0	2001 Copa América	Córdoba	47,000	
354	4 August 2001	Meadowlands Stadium, East Rutherford (N)	Liberia	2–1	Friendly	Ó. Díaz, Becerra	41,794	
355	16 August 2001	Estadio El Campín, Bogotá (H)	Peru	0–1	2002 FIFA World Cup qualification		33,875	
356	5 September 2001	Estadio El Campín, Bogotá (H)	Ecuador	0–0	2002 FIFA World Cup qualification		28,487	
357	7 October 2001	Estadio Centenario, Montevideo (A)	Uruguay	1–1	2002 FIFA World Cup qualification	Valentierra	60,000	
358	7 November 2001	Estadio El Campín, Bogotá (H)	Chile	3–1	2002 FIFA World Cup qualification	Grisales, Ángel, González	16,050	
359	14 November 2001	Estadio Defensores del Chaco, Asunción (A)	Paraguay	4–0	2002 FIFA World Cup qualification	Aristizábal (3), R. Castillo	25,000	
360	7 May 2002	Olympic Stadium, Caracas (A)	Venezuela	0–0	Friendly		25,000	
361	9 May 2002	Estadio Ricardo Saprissa Aymá, San José (A)	Costa Rica	2–1	Friendly	R. Castillo (2)	20,000	
362	12 May 2002	Estadio Azteca, Mexico City (A)	Mexico	1–2	Friendly	Restrepo	50,000	
363	20 November 2002	Estadio General Francisco Morazán, San Pedro Sula (A)	Honduras	0–1	Friendly		25,000	
364	12 February 2003	Bank One Ballpark, Phoenix (N)	Mexico	0–0	Friendly		28,764	
365	29 March 2003	Busan Asiad Main Stadium, Busan (A)	South Korea	0–0	Friendly		56,000	
366	30 April 2003	Miami Orange Bowl, Miami (N)	Honduras	0–0	Friendly		10,441	
367	8 June 2003	Metropolitano Stadium, Madrid (N)	Ecuador	0–0	Friendly		12,000	
368	18 June 2003	Stade de Gerland, Lyon (N)	France	0–1	2003 FIFA Confederations Cup		38,500	
369	20 June 2003	Stade de Gerland, Lyon (N)	New Zealand	3–1	2003 FIFA Confederations Cup	López, Yepes, G. Hernández	22,811	
370	22 June 2003	Stade Geoffroy-Guichard, Saint-Étienne (N)	Japan	1–0	2003 FIFA Confederations Cup	G. Hernández	24,541	
371	26 June 2003	Stade de Gerland, Lyon (N)	Cameroon	0–1	2003 FIFA Confederations Cup		12,352	
372	28 June 2003	Stade Geoffroy-Guichard, Saint-Étienne (N)	Turkey	1–2	2003 FIFA Confederations Cup	G. Hernández	18,237	
373	13 July 2003	Miami Orange Bowl, Miami (N)	Jamaica	1–0	2003 CONCACAF Gold Cup	Patiño	15,423	
374	17 July 2003	Miami Orange Bowl, Miami (N)	Guatemala	1–1	2003 CONCACAF Gold Cup	Molina	13,000	
375	19 July 2003	Miami Orange Bowl, Miami (N)	Brazil	0–2	2003 CONCACAF Gold Cup		23,425	
376	20 August 2003	Shea Stadium, New York City (N)	Slovakia	0–0	Friendly		16,000	
377	7 September 2003	Estadio Metropolitano, Barranquilla (H)	Brazil	1–2	2006 FIFA World Cup qualification	Ángel	47,600	
378	10 September 2003	Estadio Hernando Siles, La Paz (A)	Bolivia	0–4	2006 FIFA World Cup qualification		23,200	
379	15 November 2003	Estadio Metropolitano, Barranquilla (H)	Venezuela	0–1	2006 FIFA World Cup qualification		20,000	
380	19 November 2003	Estadio Metropolitano, Barranquilla (H)	Argentina	1–1	2006 FIFA World Cup qualification	Ángel	19,034	
381	18 February 2004	Estadio Tiburcio Carías Andino, Tegucigalpa (A)	Honduras	1–1	Friendly	Herrera	8,000	
382	31 March 2004	Estadio Nacional, Lima (A)	Peru	2–0	2006 FIFA World Cup qualification	Grisales, Oviedo	29,325	
383	28 April 2004	Robert F. Kennedy Memorial Stadium, Washington, D.C. (N)	El Salvador	2–0	Friendly	Rey, Oviedo	21,000	
384	2 June 2004	Estadio Olímpico Atahualpa, Quito (A)	Ecuador	1–2	2006 FIFA World Cup qualification	Oviedo	31,484	
385	6 June 2004	Estadio Metropolitano, Barranquilla (H)	Uruguay	5–0	2006 FIFA World Cup qualification	Pacheco (2), T. Moreno, Restrepo, Herrera	7,000	
386	27 June 2004	Miami Orange Bowl, Miami (N)	Argentina	2–0	Friendly	T. Moreno, Herrera	–	
387	6 July 2004	Estadio Nacional, Lima (N)	Venezuela	1–0	2004 Copa América	T. Moreno	45,000	
388	9 July 2004	Estadio Nacional, Lima (N)	Bolivia	1–0	2004 Copa América	Perea	35,000	
389	12 July 2004	Estadio Mansiche, Trujillo (N)	Peru	2–2	2004 Copa América	Congo, Aguilar	25,000	
390	17 July 2004	Estadio Mansiche, Trujillo (N)	Costa Rica	2–0	2004 Copa América	Aguilar, T. Moreno	18,000	
391	20 July 2004	Estadio Nacional, Lima (N)	Argentina	0–3	2004 Copa América		22,000	
392	24 July 2004	Estadio Garcilaso, Cusco (N)	Uruguay	1–2	2004 Copa América	Herrera	35,000	
393	5 September 2004	Estadio Nacional, Santiago (A)	Chile	0–0	2006 FIFA World Cup qualification		62,523	
394	9 October 2004	Estadio Metropolitano, Barranquilla (H)	Paraguay	1–1	2006 FIFA World Cup qualification	Grisales	25,000	
395	13 October 2004	Estádio Rei Pelé, Maceió (A)	Brazil	0–0	2006 FIFA World Cup qualification		20,000	
396	17 November 2004	Estadio Metropolitano, Barranquilla (H)	Bolivia	1–0	2006 FIFA World Cup qualification	Yepes	25,000	
397	15 January 2005	Los Angeles Memorial Coliseum, Los Angeles (N)	South Korea	2–1	Friendly	J. Castillo, Perea	–	
398	17 January 2005	Los Angeles Memorial Coliseum, Los Angeles (N)	Guatemala	1–1	Friendly	Hurtado	15,000	
399	23 February 2005	Estadio Banorte, Culiacán (A)	Mexico	1–1	Friendly	Perea	–	
400	9 March 2005	Titan Stadium, Fullerton (A)	United States	0–3	Friendly		7,086	
401	26 March 2005	Estadio José Pachencho Romero, Maracaibo (A)	Venezuela	0–0	2006 FIFA World Cup qualification		18,000	
402	30 March 2005	Estadio Monumental, Buenos Aires (A)	Argentina	0–1	2006 FIFA World Cup qualification		40,000	
403	31 May 2005	Giants Stadium, East Rutherford (N)	England	2–3	Friendly	Yepes, Ramírez	50,807	
404	4 June 2005	Estadio Metropolitano, Barranquilla (H)	Peru	5–0	2006 FIFA World Cup qualification	Rey, Soto, Ángel, Restrepo, Perea	15,000	
405	8 June 2005	Estadio Metropolitano, Barranquilla (H)	Ecuador	3–0	2006 FIFA World Cup qualification	T. Moreno, Arzuaga	20,402	
406	6 July 2005	Miami Orange Bowl, Miami (N)	Panama	0–1	2005 CONCACAF Gold Cup		10,311	
407	10 July 2005	Miami Orange Bowl, Miami (N)	Honduras	1–2	2005 CONCACAF Gold Cup	T. Moreno	17,292	
408	12 July 2005	Miami Orange Bowl, Miami (N)	Trinidad and Tobago	2–0	2005 CONCACAF Gold Cup	Aguilar, Hurtado	11,000	
409	17 July 2005	Reliant Stadium, Houston (N)	Mexico	2–1	2005 CONCACAF Gold Cup	Castrillón, Aguilar	60,050	
410	21 July 2005	Giants Stadium, East Rutherford (N)	Panama	2–3	2005 CONCACAF Gold Cup	Patiño (2)	41,721	
411	4 September 2005	Estadio Centenario, Montevideo (A)	Uruguay	2–3	2006 FIFA World Cup qualification	Soto, Ángel	60,000	
412	8 October 2005	Estadio Metropolitano, Barranquilla (H)	Chile	1–1	2006 FIFA World Cup qualification	Rey	22,380	
413	12 October 2005	Estadio Defensores del Chaco, Asunción (A)	Paraguay	1–0	2006 FIFA World Cup qualification	Rey	12,374	
414	1 March 2006	Estadio José Pachencho Romero, Maracaibo (A)	Venezuela	1–1	Friendly	Soto	15,000	
415	25 May 2006	Giants Stadium, East Rutherford (N)	Ecuador	1–1	Friendly	Soto	52,425	
416	27 May 2006	Soldier Field, Chicago (N)	Romania	0–0	Friendly		15,000	
417	30 May 2006	Stadion Śląski, Chorzów (A)	Poland	2–1	Friendly	Murillo, N. Martínez	40,000	
418	2 June 2006	Borussia-Park, Mönchengladbach (A)	Germany	0–3	Friendly		45,000	
419	4 June 2006	Camp Nou, Barcelona (N)	Morocco	2–0	Friendly	Rodallega, Soto	11,000	
420	16 August 2006	Estadio Nacional, Santiago (A)	Chile	2–1	Friendly	Preciado, Soto	20,000	
421	7 February 2007	Estadio Metropolitano, Barranquilla (H)	Uruguay	1–3	Friendly	Rodallega	–	
422	25 March 2007	Miami Orange Bowl, Miami (N)	Switzerland	3–1	Friendly	Perea, Viáfara, Chitiva	16,000	
423	28 March 2007	Estadio El Campín, Bogotá (H)	Paraguay	2–0	Friendly	Mosquera, Domínguez	28,000	
424	9 May 2007	Estadio Rommel Fernández, Panama City (A)	Panama	4–0	Friendly	Mendoza, Valoyes, Rodallega, Anchico	4,000	
425	3 June 2007	Matsumotodaira Park Stadium, Matsumoto (N)	Montenegro	1–0	2007 Kirin Cup	Falcao	10,070	
426	5 June 2007	Saitama Stadium, Saitama (N)	Japan	0–0	2007 Kirin Cup		45,091	
427	23 June 2007	Estadio Metropolitano, Barranquilla (H)	Ecuador	3–1	Friendly	Rodallega, Yepes, Perea	35,000	
428	28 June 2007	Estadio José Pachencho Romero, Maracaibo (N)	Paraguay	0–5	2007 Copa América		30,000	
429	2 July 2007	Estadio José Pachencho Romero, Maracaibo (N)	Argentina	2–4	2007 Copa América	Perea, Castrillón	35,000	
430	5 July 2007	Estadio Metropolitano, Cabudare (N)	United States	1–0	2007 Copa América	Castrillón	37,000	
431	22 August 2007	Dick's Sporting Goods Park, Commerce City (N)	Mexico	1–0	Friendly	Castrillón	–	
432	8 September 2007	Estadio Monumental, Lima (A)	Peru	2–2	Friendly	W. Rentería, Falcao	20,000	
433	12 September 2007	Estadio El Campín, Bogotá (H)	Paraguay	1–0	Friendly	W. Rentería	18,000	
434	14 October 2007	Estadio El Campín, Bogotá (H)	Brazil	0–0	2010 FIFA World Cup qualification		41,000	
435	17 October 2007	Estadio Hernando Siles, La Paz (A)	Bolivia	0–0	2010 FIFA World Cup qualification		19,469	
436	17 November 2007	Estadio El Campín, Bogotá (H)	Venezuela	1–0	2010 FIFA World Cup qualification	Bustos	28,273	
437	20 November 2007	Estadio El Campín, Bogotá (H)	Argentina	2–1	2010 FIFA World Cup qualification	Bustos, D. Moreno	41,700	
438	6 February 2008	Estadio Centenario, Montevideo (A)	Uruguay	2–2	Friendly	Perea (2)	31,000	
439	26 March 2008	Lockhart Stadium, Fort Lauderdale (N)	Honduras	1–2	Friendly	W. Rentería	18,886	
440	30 April 2008	Estadio Alfonso López, Bucaramanga (H)	Venezuela	5–2	Friendly	Rodallega (2), Polo, G. Hernández, Mosquera	20,000	
441	29 May 2008	Craven Cottage, London (N)	Republic of Ireland	0–1	Friendly		15,000	
442	3 June 2008	Stade de France, Saint-Denis (A)	France	0–1	Friendly		78,000	
443	14 June 2008	Estadio Monumental, Lima (A)	Peru	1–1	2010 FIFA World Cup qualification	Rodallega	25,000	
444	18 June 2008	Estadio Olímpico Atahualpa, Quito (A)	Ecuador	0–0	2010 FIFA World Cup qualification		33,588	
445	20 August 2008	Giants Stadium, East Rutherford (N)	Ecuador	0–1	Friendly		–	
446	6 September 2008	Estadio El Campín, Bogotá (H)	Uruguay	0–1	2010 FIFA World Cup qualification		35,024	
447	10 September 2008	Estadio Nacional, Santiago (A)	Chile	0–4	2010 FIFA World Cup qualification		38,000	
448	11 October 2008	Estadio El Campín, Bogotá (H)	Paraguay	0–1	2010 FIFA World Cup qualification		26,000	
449	15 October 2008	Maracanã Stadium, Rio de Janeiro (A)	Brazil	0–0	2010 FIFA World Cup qualification		54,910	
450	19 November 2008	Estadio El Campín, Bogotá (H)	Nigeria	1–0	Friendly	Falcao	10,000	
451	11 February 2009	Estadio Hernán Ramírez Villegas, Pereira (H)	Haiti	2–0	Friendly	Marín, Torres	18,000	
452	28 March 2009	Estadio El Campín, Bogotá (H)	Bolivia	2–0	2010 FIFA World Cup qualification	Torres, W. Rentería	22,044	
453	31 March 2009	Polideportivo Cachamay, Ciudad Guayana (A)	Venezuela	0–2	2010 FIFA World Cup qualification		35,000	
454	6 June 2009	Estadio Monumental, Buenos Aires (A)	Argentina	0–1	2010 FIFA World Cup qualification		55,000	
455	10 June 2009	Estadio Atanasio Girardot, Medellín (H)	Peru	1–0	2010 FIFA World Cup qualification	Falcao	32,300	
456	7 August 2009	Robertson Stadium, Houston (N)	El Salvador	2–1	Friendly	Gutiérrez, Mendoza	20,418	
457	12 August 2009	Giants Stadium, East Rutherford (N)	Venezuela	1–2	Friendly	Falcao	–	
458	5 September 2009	Estadio Atanasio Girardot, Medellín (H)	Ecuador	2–0	2010 FIFA World Cup qualification	J. Martínez, Gutiérrez	42,000	
459	9 September 2009	Estadio Centenario, Montevideo (A)	Uruguay	1–3	2010 FIFA World Cup qualification	J. Martínez	40,000	
460	30 September 2009	Cotton Bowl, Dallas (N)	Mexico	2–1	Friendly	G. Moreno, D. Quintero	–	
461	10 October 2009	Estadio Atanasio Girardot, Medellín (H)	Chile	2–4	2010 FIFA World Cup qualification	J. Martínez, G. Moreno	38,000	
462	14 October 2009	Estadio Defensores del Chaco, Asunción (A)	Paraguay	2–0	2010 FIFA World Cup qualification	Ramos, Rodallega	17,503	
463	27 May 2010	Soccer City, Johannesburg (A)	South Africa	1–2	Friendly	G. Moreno	76,000	
464	30 May 2010	Stadium MK, Milton Keynes (N)	Nigeria	1–1	Friendly	Valdés	–	
465	11 August 2010	Estadio Hernando Siles, La Paz (A)	Bolivia	1–1	Friendly	Bacca	4,000	
466	3 September 2010	Estadio José Antonio Anzoátegui, Barcelona (A)	Venezuela	2–0	Friendly	Cuadrado, D. Moreno	30,000	
467	7 September 2010	Estadio Universitario, San Nicolás de los Garza (A)	Mexico	0–1	Friendly		–	
468	8 October 2010	Red Bull Arena, Harrison (N)	Ecuador	1–0	Friendly	Falcao	25,000	
469	12 October 2010	PPL Park, Chester (A)	United States	0–0	Friendly		8,823	
470	17 November 2010	Estadio El Campín, Bogotá (H)	Peru	1–1	Friendly	Núñez	–	
471	9 February 2011	Santiago Bernabéu Stadium, Madrid (A)	Spain	0–1	Friendly		75,000	
472	26 March 2011	Vicente Calderón Stadium, Madrid (N)	Ecuador	2–0	Friendly	Guarín, Falcao	–	
473	29 March 2011	ADO Den Haag Stadium, The Hague (N)	Chile	0–2	Friendly		–	
474	2 July 2011	Estadio 23 de Agosto, San Salvador de Jujuy (N)	Costa Rica	1–0	2011 Copa América	Ramos	23,500	
475	6 July 2011	Estadio Brigadier General Estanislao López, Santa Fe (N)	Argentina	0–0	2011 Copa América		47,000	
476	10 July 2011	Estadio Brigadier General Estanislao López, Santa Fe (N)	Bolivia	2–0	2011 Copa América	Falcao (2)	12,000	
477	16 July 2011	Estadio Mario Alberto Kempes Córdoba (N)	Peru	0–2 (a.e.t.)	2011 Copa América		30,000	
478	3 September 2011	Red Bull Arena, Harrison (N)	Honduras	2–0	Friendly	Gutiérrez (2)	–	
479	6 September 2011	Lockhart Stadium, Fort Lauderdale (N)	Jamaica	2–0	Friendly	Gutiérrez, J. Martínez	–	
480	11 October 2011	Estadio Hernando Siles, La Paz (A)	Bolivia	2–1	2014 FIFA World Cup qualification	Pabón, Falcao	33,155	
481	11 November 2011	Estadio Metropolitano, Barranquilla (H)	Venezuela	1–1	2014 FIFA World Cup qualification	Guarín	43,953	
482	15 November 2011	Estadio Metropolitano, Barranquilla (H)	Argentina	1–2	2014 FIFA World Cup qualification	Pabón	49,600	
483	29 February 2012	Sun Life Stadium, Miami Gardens (N)	Mexico	2–0	Friendly	Falcao, Cuadrado	–	
484	3 June 2012	Estadio Monumental, Lima (A)	Peru	1–0	2014 FIFA World Cup qualification	Rodríguez	34,866	
485	10 June 2012	Estadio Olímpico Atahualpa, Quito (A)	Ecuador	0–1	2014 FIFA World Cup qualification		37,353	
486	7 September 2012	Estadio Metropolitano, Barranquilla (H)	Uruguay	4–0	2014 FIFA World Cup qualification	Falcao, Gutiérrez (2), Zúñiga	45,000	
487	11 September 2012	Estadio Monumental, Santiago (A)	Chile	3–1	2014 FIFA World Cup qualification	Rodríguez, Falcao, Gutiérrez	38,000	
488	12 October 2012	Estadio Metropolitano, Barranquilla (H)	Paraguay	2–0	2014 FIFA World Cup qualification	Falcao (2)	45,000	
489	16 October 2012	Estadio Metropolitano, Barranquilla (H)	Cameroon	3–0	Friendly	J. Martínez, Bacca, Pabón	–	
490	14 November 2012	MetLife Stadium, East Rutherford (N)	Brazil	1–1	Friendly	Cuadrado	38,624	
491	6 February 2013	Sun Life Stadium, Miami Gardens (N)	Guatemala	4–1	Friendly	J. Martínez (2), Aguilar, Muriel	–	
492	22 March 2013	Estadio Metropolitano, Barranquilla (H)	Bolivia	5–0	2014 FIFA World Cup qualification	Torres, Valdés, Gutiérrez, Falcao, Armero	40,478	
493	26 March 2013	Polideportivo Cachamay, Ciudad Guayana (A)	Venezuela	0–1	2014 FIFA World Cup qualification		41,250	
494	7 June 2013	Estadio Monumental, Buenos Aires (A)	Argentina	0–0	2014 FIFA World Cup qualification		44,807	
495	11 June 2013	Estadio Metropolitano, Barranquilla (H)	Peru	2–0	2014 FIFA World Cup qualification	Falcao, Gutiérrez	42,265	
496	14 August 2013	Mini Estadi, Barcelona (N)	Serbia	1–0	Friendly	Guarín	–	
497	6 September 2013	Estadio Metropolitano, Barranquilla (H)	Ecuador	1–0	2014 FIFA World Cup qualification	Rodríguez	46,000	
498	10 September 2013	Estadio Centenario, Montevideo (A)	Uruguay	0–2	2014 FIFA World Cup qualification		51,000	
499	11 October 2013	Estadio Metropolitano, Barranquilla (H)	Chile	3–3	2014 FIFA World Cup qualification	Gutiérrez, Falcao (2)	40,388	
500	15 October 2013	Estadio Defensores del Chaco, Asunción (A)	Paraguay	2–1	2014 FIFA World Cup qualification	Yepes (2)	7,142	
501	14 November 2013	King Baudouin Stadium, Brussels (A)	Belgium	2–0	Friendly	Falcao, Ibarbo	45,000	
502	19 November 2013	Amsterdam Arena, Amsterdam (A)	Netherlands	0–0	Friendly		53,000	
503	5 March 2014	Estadi Cornellà-El Prat, Cornellà de Llobregat (N)	Tunisia	1–1	Friendly	Rodríguez	–	
504	31 May 2014	Estadio Pedro Bidegain, Buenos Aires (N)	Senegal	2–2	Friendly	Gutiérrez, Bacca	9,000	
505	6 June 2014	Estadio Pedro Bidegain, Buenos Aires (N)	Jordan	3–0	Friendly	Rodríguez, Cuadrado, Guarín	–	
506	14 June 2014	Mineirão, Belo Horizonte (N)	Greece	3–0	2014 FIFA World Cup	Armero, Gutiérrez, Rodríguez	57,174	
507	19 June 2014	Estádio Nacional Mané Garrincha, Brasília (N)	Ivory Coast	2–1	2014 FIFA World Cup	Rodríguez, J. Quintero	68,748	
508	24 June 2014	Arena Pantanal, Cuiabá (N)	Japan	4–1	2014 FIFA World Cup	Cuadrado, J. Martínez (2), Rodríguez	40,340	
509	28 June 2014	Maracanã Stadium, Rio de Janeiro (N)	Uruguay	2–0	2014 FIFA World Cup	Rodríguez (2)	73,840	
510	4 July 2014	Castelão, Fortaleza (N)	Brazil	1–2	2014 FIFA World Cup	Rodríguez	60,342	
511	5 September 2014	Sun Life Stadium, Miami Gardens (N)	Brazil	0–1	Friendly		73,479	
512	10 October 2014	Red Bull Arena, Harrison (N)	El Salvador	3–0	Friendly	Falcao, Bacca (2)	–	
513	14 October 2014	Red Bull Arena, Harrison (N)	Canada	1–0	Friendly	Rodríguez	–	
514	14 November 2014	Craven Cottage, London (N)	United States	2–1	Friendly	Bacca, Gutiérrez	24,235	
515	18 November 2014	Stožice Stadium, Ljubljana (A)	Slovenia	1–0	Friendly	Ramos	15,250	
516	26 March 2015	Bahrain National Stadium, Riffa (A)	Bahrain	6–0	Friendly	Bacca, Falcao (2), Ramos, Mojica, A. Rentería	–	
517	30 March 2015	Mohammed bin Zayed Stadium, Abu Dhabi (N)	Kuwait	3–1	Friendly	Aguilar, Cardona, Falcao	6,000	
518	6 June 2015	Estadio Pedro Bidegain, Buenos Aires (N)	Costa Rica	1–0	Friendly	Falcao	–	
519	14 June 2015	Estadio El Teniente, Rancagua (N)	Venezuela	0–1	2015 Copa América		12,387	
520	17 June 2015	Estadio Monumental, Santiago (N)	Brazil	1–0	2015 Copa América	Murillo	44,008	
521	21 June 2015	Estadio Municipal Germán Becker, Temuco (N)	Peru	0–0	2015 Copa América		17,231	
522	26 June 2015	Estadio Sausalito, Viña del Mar (N)	Argentina	0–0 (4–5p)	2015 Copa América		21,508	
523	5 September 2015	Red Bull Arena, Harrison (N)	Peru	1–1	Friendly	Bacca	24,800	
524	8 October 2015	Estadio Metropolitano, Barranquilla (H)	Peru	2–0	2018 FIFA World Cup qualification	Gutiérrez, Cardona	45,530	
525	13 October 2015	Estadio Centenario, Montevideo (A)	Uruguay	0–3	2018 FIFA World Cup qualification		40,124	
526	12 November 2015	Estadio Nacional, Santiago (A)	Chile	1–1	2018 FIFA World Cup qualification	Rodríguez	45,316	
527	17 November 2015	Estadio Metropolitano, Barranquilla (H)	Argentina	0–1	2018 FIFA World Cup qualification		46,000	
528	24 March 2016	Estadio Hernando Siles, La Paz (A)	Bolivia	3–2	2018 FIFA World Cup qualification	Rodríguez, Bacca, Cardona	26,765	
529	29 March 2016	Estadio Metropolitano, Barranquilla (H)	Ecuador	3–1	2018 FIFA World Cup qualification	Bacca (2), Pérez	38,400	
530	29 May 2016	Marlins Park, Miami (N)	Haiti	3–1	Friendly	D. Moreno, Cuadrado, Martínez	–	
531	3 June 2016	Levi's Stadium, Santa Clara (N)	United States	2–0	Copa América Centenario	C. Zapata, Rodríguez	67,439	
532	7 June 2016	Rose Bowl, Pasadena (N)	Paraguay	2–1	Copa América Centenario	Bacca, Rodríguez	42,766	
533	11 June 2016	NRG Stadium, Houston (N)	Costa Rica	2–3	Copa América Centenario	Fabra, M. Moreno	45,808	
534	17 June 2016	MetLife Stadium, East Rutherford (N)	Peru	0–0 (4–2p)	Copa América Centenario		79,194	
535	22 June 2016	Soldier Field, Chicago (N)	Chile	0–2	Copa América Centenario		55,423	
536	25 June 2016	University of Phoenix Stadium, Glendale (N)	United States	1–0	Copa América Centenario	Bacca	29,041	
537	1 September 2016	Estadio Metropolitano, Barranquilla (H)	Venezuela	2–0	2018 FIFA World Cup qualification	Rodríguez, Torres	37,099	
538	6 September 2016	Arena da Amazônia, Manaus (A)	Brazil	1–2	2018 FIFA World Cup qualification	Marquinhos (o.g.)	36,009	
539	6 October 2016	Estadio Defensores del Chaco, Asunción (A)	Paraguay	1–0	2018 FIFA World Cup qualification	Cardona	41,300	
540	11 October 2016	Estadio Metropolitano, Barranquilla (H)	Uruguay	2–2	2018 FIFA World Cup qualification	Aguilar, Mina	47,000	
541	10 November 2016	Estadio Metropolitano, Barranquilla (H)	Chile	0–0	2018 FIFA World Cup qualification		45,916	
542	15 November 2016	Estadio San Juan del Bicentenario, San Juan (A)	Argentina	0–3	2018 FIFA World Cup qualification		24,000	
543	25 January 2017	Estádio Olímpico Nilton Santos, Rio de Janeiro (A)	Brazil	0–1	Friendly		–	
544	23 March 2017	Estadio Metropolitano, Barranquilla (H)	Bolivia	1–0	2018 FIFA World Cup qualification	Rodríguez	39,000	
545	28 March 2017	Estadio Olímpico Atahualpa, Quito (A)	Ecuador	2–0	2018 FIFA World Cup qualification	Rodríguez, Cuadrado	35,538	
546	7 June 2017	Estadio Nueva Condomina, Murcia (A)	Spain	2–2	Friendly	Cardona, Falcao	31,179	
547	13 June 2017	Coliseum Alfonso Pérez, Getafe (N)	Cameroon	4–0	Friendly	Rodríguez, Mina (2), Izquierdo	7,000	
548	31 August 2017	Estadio Polideportivo de Pueblo Nuevo, San Cristóbal (A)	Venezuela	0–0	2018 FIFA World Cup qualification		38,479	
549	5 September 2017	Estadio Metropolitano, Barranquilla (H)	Brazil	1–1	2018 FIFA World Cup qualification	Falcao	46,500	
550	5 October 2017	Estadio Metropolitano, Barranquilla (H)	Paraguay	1–2	2018 FIFA World Cup qualification	Falcao	45,000	
551	10 October 2017	Estadio Monumental, Lima (A)	Peru	1–1	2018 FIFA World Cup qualification	Rodríguez	39,637	
552	10 November 2017	Suwon World Cup Stadium, Suwon (A)	South Korea	1–2	Friendly	C. Zapata	29,750	
553	14 November 2017	Chongqing Olympic Sports Center, Chongqing	China	4–0	Friendly	Pardo, Bacca, Borja (2)	12,560	
554	23 March 2018	Stade de France, Saint-Denis (A)	France	3–2	Friendly	Muriel, Falcao, J. Quintero	79,000	
555	27 March 2018	Craven Cottage, London (N)	Australia	0–0	Friendly		25,000	
556	1 June 2018	Stadio Atleti Azzurri d'Italia, Bergamo (N)	Egypt	0–0	Friendly		3,883	
557	19 June 2018	Mordovia Arena, Saransk (N)	Japan	1–2	2018 FIFA World Cup	J. Quintero	40,842	
558	24 June 2018	Kazan Arena, Kazan (N)	Poland	3–0	2018 FIFA World Cup	Mina, Falcao, Cuadrado	42,873	
559	28 June 2018	Samara Arena, Samara (N)	Senegal	1–0	2018 FIFA World Cup	Mina	41,970	
560	3 July 2018	Otkritie Arena, Moscow (N)	England	1–1 (a.e.t.) (3–4p)	2018 FIFA World Cup	Mina	44,190	
561	7 September 2018	Hard Rock Stadium, Miami Gardens (N)	Venezuela	2–1	Friendly	Falcao, Chará	34,048	
562	11 September 2018	MetLife Stadium, East Rutherford (N)	Argentina	0–0	Friendly		35,624	
563	11 October 2018	Raymond James Stadium, Tampa (A)	United States	4–2	Friendly	Rodríguez, Bacca, Falcao, Borja	38,631	
564	16 October 2018	Red Bull Arena, Harrison (N)	Costa Rica	3–1	Friendly	Bacca, C. Hernández (2)	22,000	
565	22 March 2019	Nissan Stadium, Yokohama (A)	Japan	1–0	Friendly	Falcao	63,302	
566	26 March 2019	Seoul World Cup Stadium, Seoul (A)	South Korea	1–2	Friendly	L. Díaz	64,388	
567	3 June 2019	Estadio El Campín, Bogotá (H)	Panama	3–0	Friendly	Tesillo, Muriel, Falcao	12,000	
568	9 June 2019	Estadio Monumental, Lima (A)	Peru	3–0	Friendly	Uribe (2), D. Zapata	–	
569	15 June 2019	Arena Fonte Nova, Salvador (N)	Argentina	2–0	2019 Copa América	Martínez, D. Zapata	35,572	
570	19 June 2019	Estádio do Morumbi, São Paulo (N)	Qatar	1–0	2019 Copa América	D. Zapata	22,079	
571	23 June 2019	Arena Fonte Nova, Salvador (N)	Paraguay	1–0	2019 Copa América	Cuéllar	13,903	
572	28 June 2019	Arena Corinthians, São Paulo (N)	Chile	0–0 (4–5p)	2019 Copa América		44,062	
573	6 September 2019	Hard Rock Stadium, Miami Gardens (N)	Brazil	2–2	Friendly	Muriel (2)	–	
574	10 September 2019	Raymond James Stadium, Tampa (N)	Venezuela	0–0	Friendly		–	
575	12 October 2019	Estadio José Rico Pérez, Alicante (N)	Chile	0–0	Friendly		–	
576	15 October 2019	Stade Pierre-Mauroy, Villeneuve-d'Ascq (N)	Algeria	0–3	Friendly		–	
577	15 November 2019	Hard Rock Stadium, Miami Gardens (N)	Peru	1–0	Friendly	Morelos	36,063	
578	19 November 2019	Red Bull Arena, Harrison (N)	Ecuador	1–0	Friendly	Uribe	10,000	

== Record by opponent ==
Team	Pld	W	D	L	GF	GA	GD	WPCT
Algeria	1	0	0	1	0	3	−3	0.00
Argentina	17	3	5	9	11	23	−12	17.65
Australia	2	1	1	0	3	2	+1	50.00
Bahrain	1	1	0	0	6	0	+6	100.00
Belgium	1	1	0	0	2	0	+2	100.00
Bolivia	13	9	3	1	21	9	+12	69.23
Brazil	15	1	7	7	8	15	−7	6.67
Cameroon	3	2	0	1	7	1	+6	66.67
Canada	2	1	0	1	1	2	−1	50.00
Chile	16	5	7	4	18	20	−2	31.25
China	1	1	0	0	4	0	+4	100.00
Costa Rica	6	5	0	1	11	5	+6	83.33
Ecuador	18	10	5	3	21	7	+14	55.56
Egypt	1	0	1	0	0	0	0	0.00
El Salvador	3	3	0	0	7	1	+6	100.00
England	2	0	1	1	3	4	−1	0.00
France	3	1	0	2	3	4	−1	33.33
Germany	1	0	0	1	0	3	−3	0.00
Greece	1	1	0	0	3	0	+3	100.00
Guatemala	3	1	2	0	6	3	+3	33.33
Haiti	2	2	0	0	5	1	+4	100.00
Honduras	8	2	2	4	7	8	−1	25.00
Ivory Coast	1	1	0	0	2	1	+1	100.00
Jamaica	4	4	0	0	7	0	+7	100.00
Japan	5	3	1	1	7	3	+4	60.00
Jordan	1	1	0	0	3	0	+3	100.00
Kuwait	1	1	0	0	3	1	+2	100.00
Liberia	1	1	0	0	2	1	+1	100.00
Mexico	10	6	2	2	13	8	+5	60.00
Montenegro	1	1	0	0	1	0	+1	100.00
Morocco	1	1	0	0	2	0	+2	100.00
Netherlands	1	0	1	0	0	0	0	0.00
New Zealand	1	1	0	0	3	1	+2	100.00
Nigeria	2	1	1	0	2	1	+1	50.00
Panama	4	2	0	2	9	4	+5	50.00
Paraguay	15	10	1	4	20	13	+7	66.67
Peru	21	11	8	2	31	12	+19	52.38
Poland	2	2	0	0	5	1	+4	100.00
Qatar	1	1	0	0	1	0	+1	100.00
Republic of Ireland	1	0	0	1	0	1	−1	0.00
Romania	1	0	1	0	0	0	0	0.00
Senegal	2	1	1	0	3	2	+1	50.00
Serbia	1	1	0	0	1	0	+1	100.00
Slovakia	1	0	1	0	0	0	0	0.00
Slovenia	1	1	0	0	1	0	+1	100.00
South Africa	1	0	0	1	1	2	−1	0.00
South Korea	4	1	1	2	4	5	−1	25.00
Spain	2	0	1	1	2	3	−1	0.00
Switzerland	1	1	0	0	3	1	+2	100.00
Trinidad and Tobago	1	1	0	0	2	0	+2	100.00
Tunisia	1	0	1	0	1	1	0	0.00
Turkey	1	0	0	1	1	2	−1	0.00
United States	9	6	2	1	13	8	+5	66.67
Uruguay	14	4	3	7	22	22	0	28.57
Venezuela	20	8	7	5	23	14	+9	40.00
Total	253	121	66	66	335	218	+117	47.83

Source: Results
