= Radamel Falcao =

Colombian footballer (born 1986)

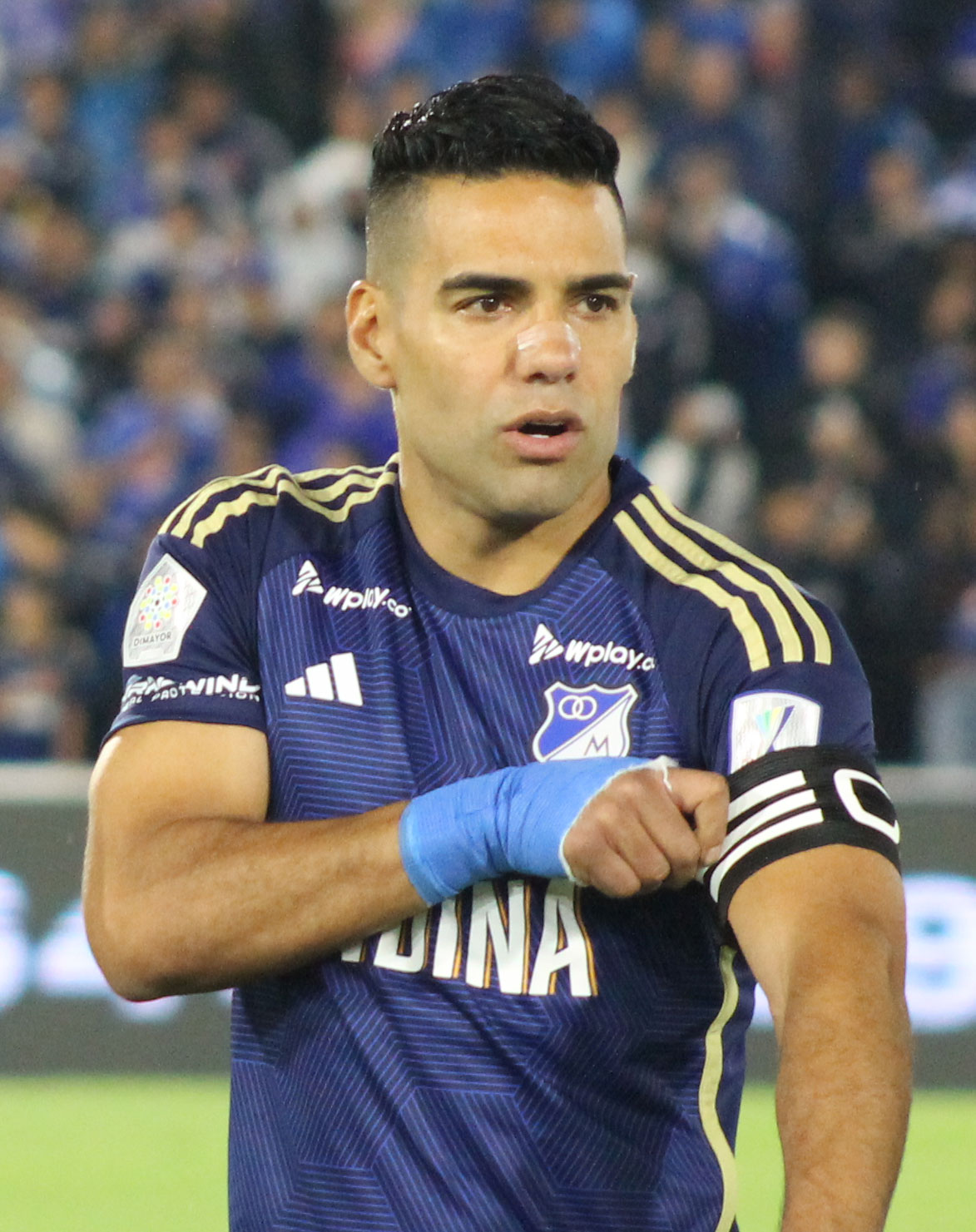
- Falcao with Millonarios in 2024

Personal information
- Full name: Radamel Falcao García Zárate
- Date of birth: 10 February 1986 (age 40)
- Place of birth: Santa Marta, Magdalena, Colombia
- Height: 1.77 m (5 ft 10 in)
- Position: Striker

Youth career
- 1997–1999: Lanceros Boyacá
- 2001–2004: River Plate

Senior career*
Years	Team	Apps	(Gls)
1999–2001	Lanceros Boyacá	11	(2)
2004–2009	River Plate	90	(34)
2009–2011	Porto	51	(41)
2011–2013	Atlético Madrid	68	(52)
2013–2019	Monaco	108	(65)
2014–2015	→ Manchester United (loan)	26	(4)
2015–2016	→ Chelsea (loan)	10	(1)
2019–2021	Galatasaray	34	(19)
2021–2024	Rayo Vallecano	71	(9)
2024–2026	Millonarios	35	(12)

International career^{‡}
2001–2005	Colombia U17	3	(1)
2005–2007	Colombia U20	12	(3)
2007–2023	Colombia	104	(36)
- * Club domestic league appearances and goals as of 19 June 2025 ‡ National team caps and goals as of 28 March 2023

Radamel Falcao García Zárate (born 10 February 1986) is a Colombian professional footballer who is a free agent but last played for Liga DIMAYOR club Millonarios. Nicknamed "El Tigre" (The Tiger), he is regarded as one of the best strikers of his generation and one of the greatest Colombian players of all time. He is the all-time top goalscorer for the Colombia national team and was the all-time top goalscorer in the UEFA Europa League until 2024. In 2012, he was named in the FIFA FIFPro World XI, finished in fifth place for the FIFA Ballon d'Or, and was awarded the Globe Soccer Best Player of the Year.

Falcao began his professional career in Argentina with River Plate, where he played in their youth academy from 2001 until 2004. In 2009, he relocated to Europe as he joined Portuguese club Porto. In 2010–11, Falcao scored twice in the Europa League final as Porto completed a treble. He was the Europa League top scorer with a competition-record 17 goals. In August 2011, he joined Atlético Madrid, where he again won the Europa League title, scoring twice in the final. In 2012–13, he scored a hat-trick in Atlético's win against Chelsea in the UEFA Super Cup and helped the club win the Copa del Rey.

Despite interest from top European clubs, Falcao signed for newly promoted Ligue 1 side Monaco in 2013 for €60 million, one of the most expensive transfers at the time. After sustaining a six-month ACL injury in his first season, he had loan spells at Premier League clubs Manchester United and Chelsea. He returned to Monaco in 2016, helping the club end the league dominance of Paris Saint-Germain by winning the 2016–17 Ligue 1 title, scoring 21 goals. Since leaving Monaco in 2019, Falcao has played for Galatasaray, Rayo Vallecano, and Millonarios.

Falcao made his senior debut for Colombia in 2007. He earned over 100 caps and scored 36 goals. He represented his country at the 2011, 2015 and 2019 Copa América. He missed the 2014 FIFA World Cup through injury, but made his World Cup debut at the 2018 tournament in Russia. He also captained the national team various times between 2015 and 2021, until recurring injuries affected his availability.

== Club career ==
=== Lanceros Boyacá ===
Falcao made his debut for Lanceros Boyacá in the Colombian Categoría Primera B (second tier) on 28 August 1999, playing the last 40 minutes against Deportivo Pereira at the age of 13 years and 199 days, thus becoming the youngest debutant at that level of Colombian professional football. In 2000, Lanceros' coach, Hernán Pacheco, began to consider the 14-year-old more seriously; Falcao played seven matches that year. On 23 July, at the Estadio Olímpico del Sol in Sogamoso, he scored his first and only goal for the club, to seal a 2–0 win against Club El Cóndor that took Lanceros off the bottom of the table. In his two years with the club, he played eight matches and scored once.

=== River Plate ===
After training with Millonarios, who did not take up their option to purchase the player, Falcao was sold to River Plate of Argentina in February 2001, for a $500,000 fee. He began his River career in the youth team, playing in the eighth division of Argentine football. River's coach, Leonardo Astrada, gave Falcao his professional debut in the 2005 Torneo Clausura, on 6 March 2005, in a game that finished in a 3–1 victory for his club against Instituto de Córdoba.

Falcao became a regular in the first team during the 2005 Apertura. He scored twice in a match for the first time in Argentina, on 2 October in a game against Independiente that finished as a 3–1 win for River. On 9 November 2005, Falcao scored a brace, which contributed to a 4–1 home win against Lanús. The following week, he scored two goals in five minutes and assisted Marcelo Gallardo as River won 5–1 against San Lorenzo; however, shortly after scoring his second goal, he suffered a ligament injury and missed the remainder of the Apertura. The Colombian striker ended the campaign with seven goals from as many games under the management of Reinaldo Merlo, who gave Falcao the trust he needed to establish himself in the team.

During pre-season in January 2006, he sustained a more serious ligament injury to the same knee, which required surgery, causing him to miss the entire 2006 Clausura and 2006 Copa Libertadores as he was kept off the pitch for about 7 months. He returned to the field in September, soon after the start of the 2006 Apertura, in which he made 12 appearances, mainly as a substitute; he scored just once, to seal a 2–0 win against Rosario Central on 23 October that took River clear at the top of the table. A few days earlier, he made his debut in CONMEBOL competition, in the last eight of the 2006 Copa Sudamericana against Atlético Paranaense. He was replaced at half-time, and the match finished 2–2; this meant River were eliminated on aggregate, as they lost the home leg 1–0.

He was sent off in his only outing in the 2007 Copa Libertadores, against Colo-Colo on 22 February 2007. Domestically, he made little impression on the 2007 Clausura. He scored in only one of the eight games he played: River's first two goals as they beat Racing Club 4–2 away from home. Falcao scored his first professional hat-trick on 27 September 2007, as River made a historic comeback against Botafogo to win the series 4–3 after trailing 3–1 on aggregate and progress into the quarter-finals of the 2007 Copa Sudamericana. Three days later, he scored in a 3–3 draw against Rosario Central, and the following week, he scored his first goal in a Superclásico as River beat Boca Juniors 2–0. On 26 October 2007, Falcao scored with a long range strike in a 2–2 draw away to Defensor Sporting; a goal which later proved to be crucial as River advanced to the Copa Sudamericana semi-finals on away goals.

River Plate were reported to have rejected a $15 million offer from Milan for Falcao in early 2008, as well as bids from clubs including Aston Villa and Fluminense. On 27 February, Falcao scored, but was red-carded, in a 2–1 win over Club América in the 2008 Copa Libertadores group stage. He was a key player in River's 2008 Clausura title, his first domestic title, scoring 6 goals. His performances linked him with moves to a variety of clubs, including Man United and Arsenal. Nevertheless, he remained with River as they suffered the worst campaign in their history, finishing bottom of the 2008 Apertura, with Falcao scoring 5 goals.

In 2009, the club had a difficult start: they were eliminated in the group stage of the 2009 Copa Libertadores and won few games at the beginning of the 2009 Clausura. Falcao retained his eye for goal and was instrumental in Nestor Gorosito's plans; having matured as a striker in the 2007–08 and 2008–09 seasons, he scored 35 combined goals in his last two years with El Millonario.

=== Porto ===
==== 2009–10 season ====
On 15 July 2009, Primeira Liga team Porto signed Falcao on a four-year contract worth €3.93 million for 60% of his economic rights after Porto sold striker Lisandro López to Lyon for €24 million. In the transaction, Porto also sold Mario Bolatti for €1.5 million to a third party owner, Natland Financier B.V., in exchange for 35% of the economic rights of Falcao. A week before, Porto rivals Benfica came very close to signing Falcao after making a €4.7 million offer, but the reluctance of the club to pay an additional €700,000 requested by Falcao for awards and delayed salaries dictated the end of negotiations. He made his debut against Paços de Ferreira on the opening matchday and scored an important goal to earn the team a draw. He went on to score three goals in as many games, making him one of the few to score four goals in the first four matchdays of the Portuguese league.

On 30 September 2009, Falcao scored his first UEFA Champions League goal, a backheel, in a 2–0 group stage win over his future club, Atlético Madrid. On 12 December, Falcao scored a header to defeat rivals Sporting in a 1–0 home victory. On 10 January 2010, Falcao scored a brace, including the winning goal, in a 3–2 league victory over Uniao de Leiria. On 2 February, Falcao scored twice in a 5–2 Taça de Portugal quarter-finals victory against rivals Sporting. In the same month, he scored the winning goal in a Champions League round of 16 victory over Arsenal, his fourth goal in the tournament, even though Porto were later eliminated from the competition. On 3 April, Falcao scored a brace against Marítimo to lead the scoring charts with 20 goals, although he would eventually finish the season as the second-highest league scorer with 25 goals, behind only Benfica's Óscar Cardozo, who had 26. Falcao later scored two more braces in away victories over Vitoria Setubal and Leiria on 24 April and 8 May respectively. He scored in his last game of the season, the 2010 Taça de Portugal Final, where Porto won 2–1 against Chaves. Falcao wrapped up the campaign with a career-high 34 goals in all competitions.

==== 2010–11 season ====
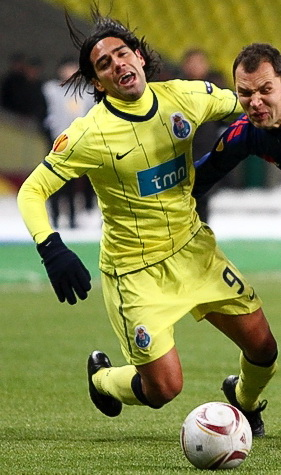
Falcao in a UEFA Europa League match against CSKA Moscow in March 2011

Falcao made an impressive start to the 2010–11 season, scoring a goal in the 2010 Portuguese Super Cup 2–0 victory over Benfica. He scored his first two league goals on the second matchday of the season in a 3–0 victory against Beira-Mar on 22 August 2010. He scored his second double for the club in a 5–1 victory over União de Leiria on 25 October. On 7 November, he scored twice, one of them a backheel goal, in a 5–0 victory against the defending champions Benfica.

On 2 December, Falcao scored his first hat-trick for Porto in a 3–1 victory against Rapid Wien during a UEFA Europa League clash, becoming the top goal scorer with seven goals. On 7 April 2011, Falcao scored another hat-trick and provided an assist in the quarter-finals of the Europa League against Russian side Spartak Moscow in a 5–1 victory, bringing his goal tally in the tournament to ten. In the second leg, he scored another goal and provided another assist in another victory with the same scoreline in a 10–3 aggregate thrashing that took Porto to the tournament's semi-final stage.

On 17 April, he scored a double against rivals Sporting CP to help defeat them 3–2. He further added to his position as top scorer in the Europa League by scoring four goals in the semi-final against Villarreal two weeks later, which finished 5–1 for Porto. In the Europa League final against domestic rivals Braga, Falcao scored the only goal of the game with a header after a cross from Fredy Guarín, giving the title to Porto. He set a new goalscoring record of 17 goals in 14 games during the Europa League campaign, surpassing Jürgen Klinsmann's previous record of 15 goals. In July 2011, Falcao extended his contract until 2015 with an added €45 million buy-out clause. Porto paid a commission of €6.58 million to extend the contract.

=== Atlético de Madrid ===
==== 2011–12 season ====
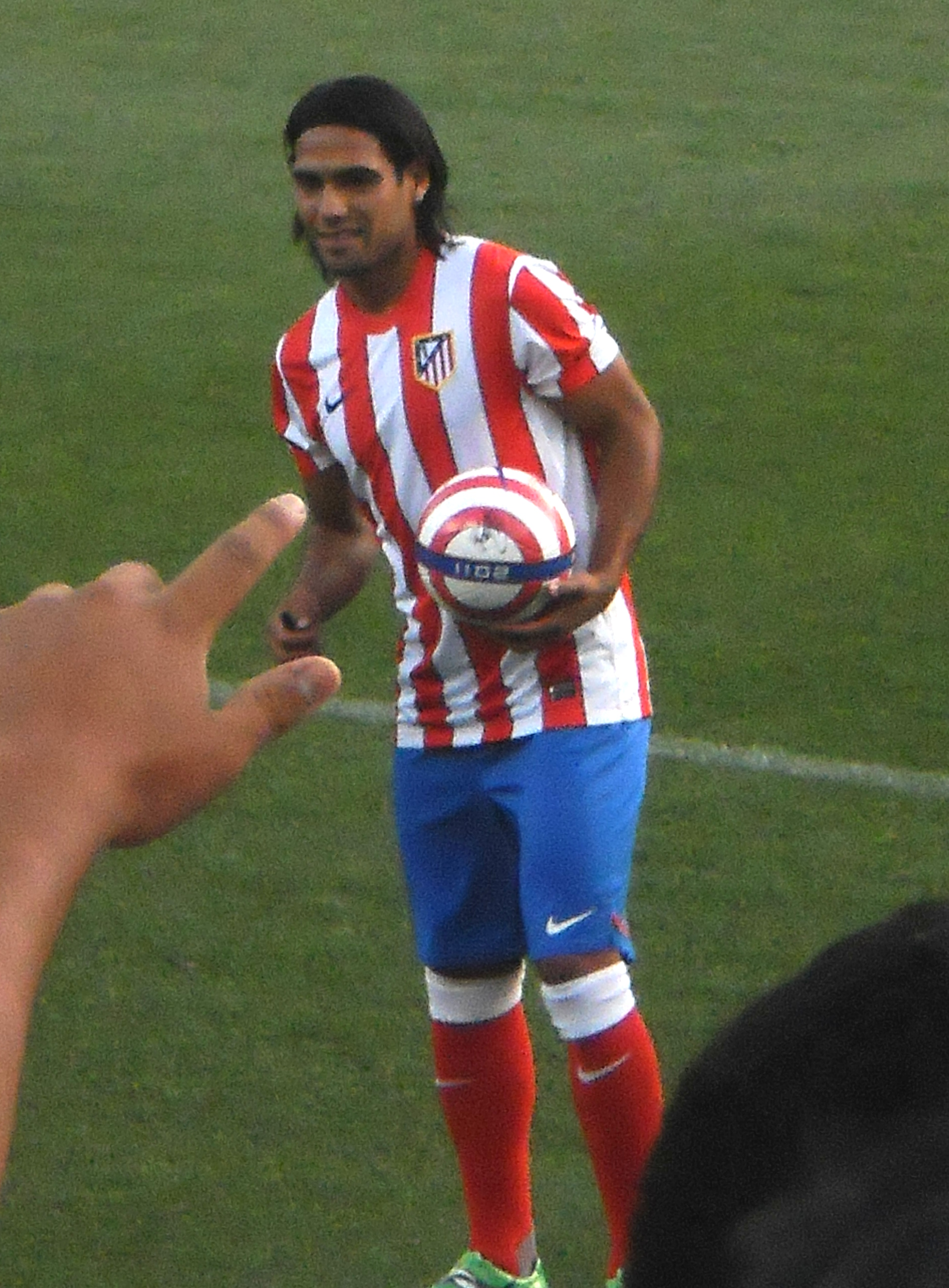
Falcao during his presentation as an Atlético Madrid player in August 2011

On 18 August 2011, Atlético announced they had signed Falcao from Porto on a €40 million transfer fee; the fee could potential rise to €50 million based on performance-based clauses, making him the most expensive player in the club's history. Atlético and the Colombian forward also agreed on a four-year contract.

Falcao made his Atlético debut on 11 September away to Valencia, playing the full 90 minutes in a 1–0 defeat. A week later, on 18 September, Falcao scored his first hat trick for Atlético in a 4–0 win against Racing Santander. On 3 November, Falcao netted a goal in Atlético's 4–0 triumph over Udinese – the goal meant that Falcao had scored 19 goals in his last 18 Europa League games.

Falcao's second hat-trick in La Liga came on 21 January 2012, when he led his team to a 4–0 victory against Real Sociedad at the Anoeta Stadium. On 16 February, in the first leg of the Europa League round of 32, Falcao scored twice and assisted a goal in an 3–1 away victory against Lazio to progress to the round of 16. In the second leg of Atlético's Round of 16 clash against Turkish club Beşiktaş, Falcao scored one goal and provided Eduardo Salvio's goal in a 3–0 victory, advancing 6–1 on aggregate. On 21 March, Falcao netted a second half double to propel his side to a 2–1 victory over Athletic Bilbao and keep Atlético in the race for European places. In both legs of the Europa League quarter-final tie versus Hannover 96, Falcao managed to score a goal in each leg, helping Atlético seal a 4–2 aggregate victory and increasing his goal tally to eight in the competition.

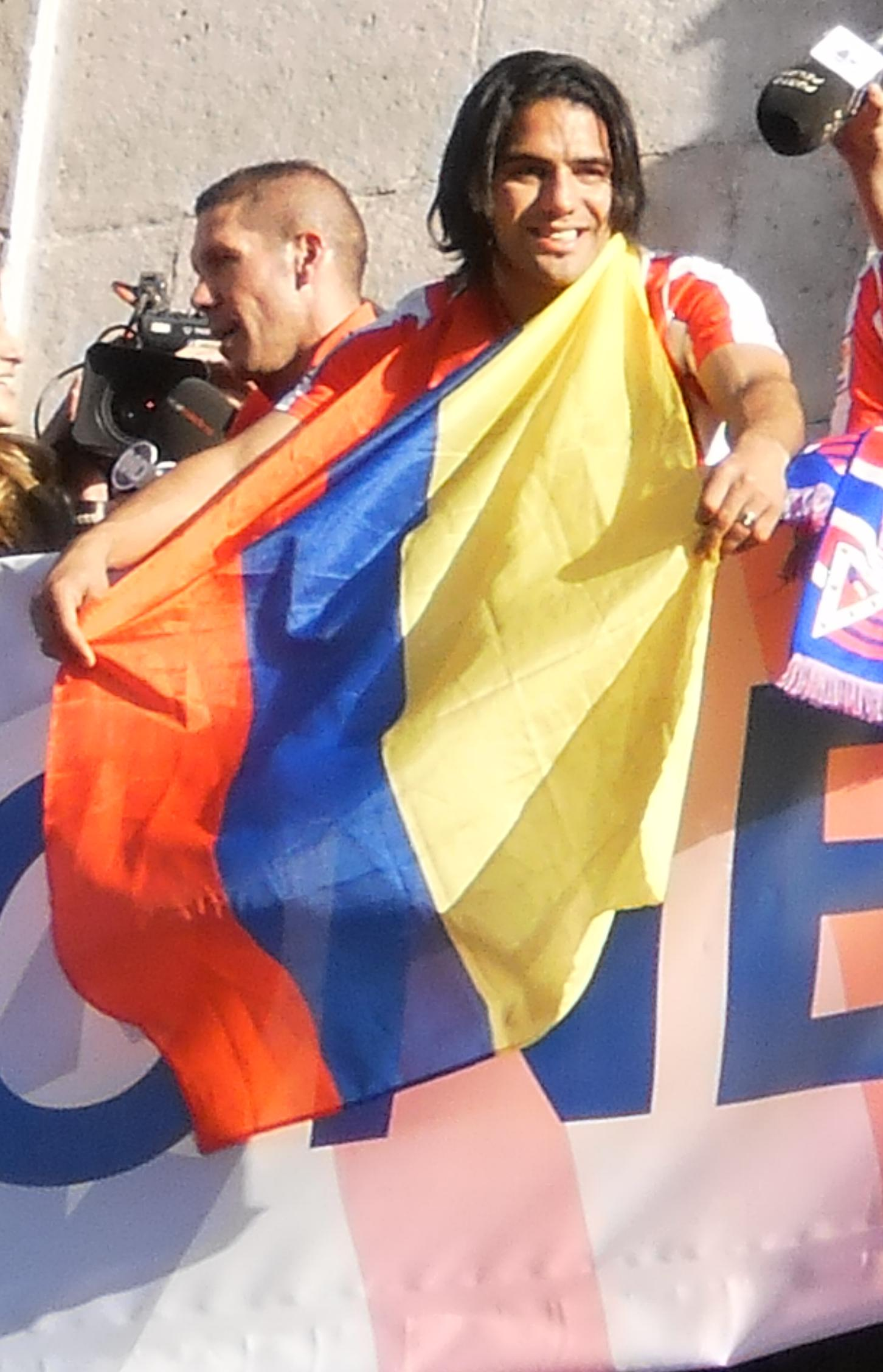
Falcao celebrates winning the 2011–12 Europa League during a trophy parade

Falcao played his first Madrid Derby against Real Madrid on 11 April 2012. He had missed the first match at the Santiago Bernabéu Stadium due to injury, and scored Atlético's only goal as his side fell 4–1 due to a hat trick by Cristiano Ronaldo. Four days later, he scored his 30th goal of the season in all competitions against Rayo Vallecano in a crucial 1–0 victory for Atlético.

In the first leg of the 2011–12 Europa League semi-finals against Valencia, Falcao scored a double in a 4–2 victory while making Atlético the first team to win ten consecutive matches in a single Europa League season. Falcao added to his Europa League tally in the final against fellow La Liga side Athletic Bilbao, netting Atlético's opening two goals in a 3–0 triumph at the Arena Națională in Bucharest on 9 May 2012. In so doing, Falcao not only became the top goal scorer in a Europa league season again, with 12 goals, but became the first player in history to win two consecutive Europa League titles with two different teams. Four days after the final, Falcao scored the only goal late into a match against Villarreal to give his team a victory in the last game of the season. After his debut season with the club, his purchase was called the "best purchase of the 21st century".

==== 2012–13 season ====
Falcao scored two hat-tricks at the start of the 2012–13 season; first in the league game against 2012 Europa League finalists Athletic Bilbao on 27 August 2012, and the second in the 4–1 defeat of Chelsea during the 2012 UEFA Super Cup four days later. At the same time, Falcao became the first player in history to score a hat trick in a UEFA Super Cup final in its current format; the original format was two legged before turning into a single legged final format in 1998. After the match, Simeone described Falcao's performance as "indescribable". On 16 September, Falcao scored what turned out to be the decisive goal from the penalty spot in a 4–3 win over Rayo Vallecano, and did the same a week later in a 2–1 triumph against Real Valladolid, before going off at half-time in order to avoid a possible groin injury. Falcao scored a double in a 4–2 away victory over Real Betis, converting a cross for the first and then scoring from the penalty spot. In October 2012, he was nominated for the 2012 FIFA Ballon d'Or, and came in 5th place. He was also in the 2012 FIFPro World XI.

On 7 October, Falcao scored a header early into the game against Málaga, and also forced Málaga defender Weligton to score an own goal, giving Atlético the 2–1 victory in the final minute. Three weeks later, he scored once again versus Real Sociedad, this time with a rare free-kick which was a last minute winner in the 1–0 victory. That was Falcao's first professional free kick goal. In a match against Sevilla, Falcao scored a penalty and assisted another goal in a 4–0 victory; the strike marked his 50th goal for Atlético. In the 6–0 victory against Deportivo de La Coruña on 9 December, Falcao scored an astonishing five goals, becoming the first player in La Liga since Fernando Morientes in 2002 to net five goals in a match.

Falcao missed the first La Liga match of 2013 due to muscle fatigue, but returned in the second match against Real Zaragoza on 13 January, where he scored a penalty in a 2–0 victory. In the first leg of the Copa del Rey quarter-finals against Betis, Falcao scored a header in a 2–0 victory on 18 January. He suffered an muscle injury in a match on 20 January, causing him to miss 3 games, including the second leg of the Copa del Rey quarter finals against Betis and the first leg of the semi-finals against Sevilla. Falcao returned for the second leg to score against Sevilla in a 2–2 draw, helping Atlético advance to the finals with a 4–3 aggregate scoreline. Falcao scored a double against Granada in a comfortable 5–0 victory on 14 April. The second goal marked Falcao's 200th career goal (counting both club and nation). A week later, Falcao scored the only goal in a 0–1 away victory against Sevilla at the Ramón Sánchez Pizjuán Stadium.

In the Madrid Derby the following week, Falcao scored Atlético's only goal once more, albeit in a 1–2 home loss. That goal was Falcao's 50th league goal with the club in just 64 appearances. On 8 May, Falcao scored the last goal for Atlético in a 3–1 away victory over Celta de Vigo. The win assured Atlético Madrid would appear in the next season's Champions League for the first time in four years. He scored his last league goal that season in a 1–2 loss against Barcelona four days later. Falcao ended the season with 28 league goals, putting him third in the top scorers chart, only behind Lionel Messi and Cristiano Ronaldo. In the 2013 Copa del Rey Final, Atlético were trailing 1–0 when Falcao delivered a timely assist to Diego Costa to tie the game. They went on to win 2–1 and defeat their arch-rivals Real Madrid for the first time in 14 years.

In May 2013, Atlético Madrid general manager Miguel Ángel Gil Marín announced that the club would not stand in the way if Falcao decided to leave, and that he and the club would support him in his decision.

=== Monaco ===
It makes me laugh at times when I get asked why I didn't stay at a particular club or why I haven't moved to another side, as if the player has a choice in the matter. I'd say back to journalists: why don't you work at CNN or ESPN? It's the same in football; on very few occasions can the player make the decision to move from one club or to another. There have been occasions when I've not been able to live in the way I want, many times. I want to go to a particular club and in finally I end up at another.

— Falcao in 2014, speaking on his move from Atlético Madrid to Monaco.

Despite being linked with various clubs such as Atlético Madrid's city rivals Real Madrid and English side Chelsea, Falcao eventually signed for newly promoted Ligue 1 side Monaco on 31 May 2013. He subsequently signed a five-year contract for an undisclosed fee, believed to be around €60 million, with his net annual salary at Monaco being reported to be around €14 million.

Despite Falcao showing optimism about his Monaco future, he gave an emotional farewell to Atlético during a press interview, expressing his enjoyment with the club and considering it to be "the best time of his career". In November 2018, he was honoured by Atlético Madrid fans with a plaque outside the Metropolitano Stadium. Falcao went on to say that part of his reason for choosing Monaco was to follow the footsteps of his idol, Thierry Henry. Monaco sporting director Vadim Vasilyev said that the club hoped to build a team around Falcao and provide a direct challenge in Ligue 1 to Qatari backed PSG. The Colombian forward added that he wanted to bring Monaco "to the top of European Football".

==== 2013–14 season ====
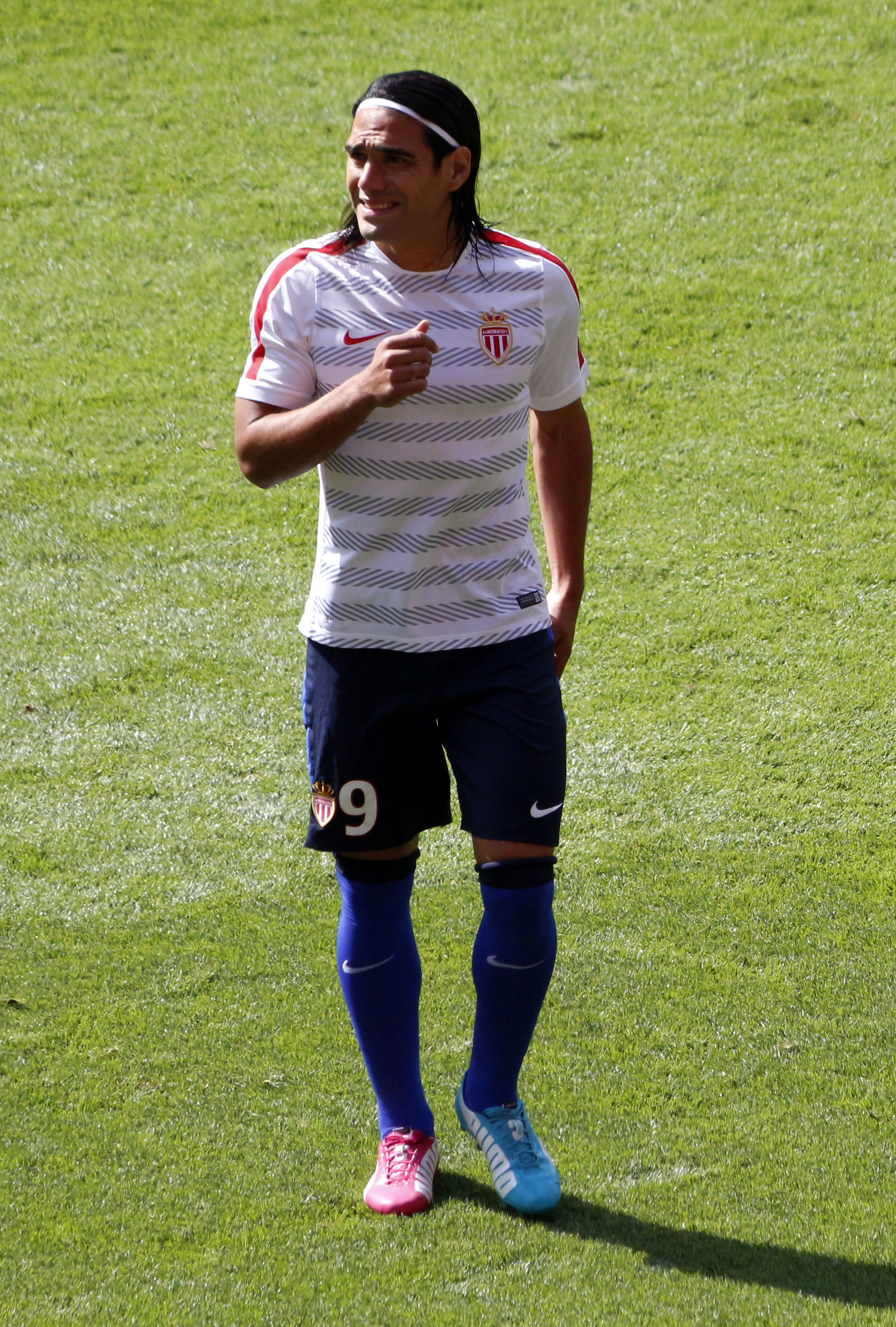
Falcao warming up ahead of a Ligue 1 match in 2014

Falcao made his Ligue 1 debut in the first match against Bordeaux on 10 August, where he managed to score in the 88th minute, sealing a 2–0 victory. Eight days later, he scored the opening goal, a penalty, in a 4–1 victory against Montpellier. In a match against Marseille on 1 September, Falcao scored the equalizer in a 2–1 victory. In a match against Lorient, Falcao scored an early penalty kick, which proved to be the winner in a 1–0 victory. Falcao managed to equalize with a diving header in a tough away match against French champions Paris Saint-Germain; the game would end 1–1 and keep Monaco on top of the league table. Days later, Falcao scored a double against Bastia in a 3–0 victory. This also brought his goal tally to seven, making him top scorer in Ligue 1.

Falcao ended his four-game goal drought for Monaco in a 2–1 win over Lyon, scoring with an impressive chip. On 27 November, it was reported that Falcao failed to fully recover from a thigh injury prior to his last match for the club, and he was forced to miss the next four league matches. Falcao made his return after being brought on within the second half against Valenciennes, where he missed a penalty kick as Monaco lost 2–1.

Falcao was reportedly heavily linked with Chelsea during the winter transfer window, with Chelsea even agreeing to an "£80 million deal" with Monaco, but Vasilvey denied these rumours and said Falcao "wasn't going anywhere" and is "very happy at the club."

Falcao started 2014 by making his Coupe de France debut in a match against Vannes, where he both assisted and scored a goal in a 3–2 victory. Falcao's second goal of the month came in the Coupe de France once more, where he scored a goal before being substituted due to an injury sustained in the first half of a 0–3 victory against Monts d'Or Azergues Foot.

On 23 January, the club confirmed on its website that Falcao had suffered a severe ACL injury in his left knee that would require 6 months to recover, and would also miss the 2014 FIFA World Cup, while effectively ending his 2013–14 season entirely. Falcao went on to say that he and his doctors were confident in a speedy recovery. Falcao also went on to say that he wanted to play in the match himself, and that Monaco head coach Claudio Ranieri did not force him to.

==== 2014–15 season ====
Falcao's full recovery was confirmed in mid-July, where he would play regularly in pre-season matches for Monaco after six months sidelined. He returned on the field at the Emirates Cup coming on as a substitute for Dimitar Berbatov in the 72nd minute as Monaco drew 2–2 against Spanish side Valencia. The next day, he played the first hour of the match against Arsenal and scored the only goal of the game in the 36th minute.

On 10 August, in his first competitive match since his injury, Falcao came on for Lucas Ocampos after 59 minutes and scored a penalty, though Monaco lost 2–1 at home to Lorient. Two weeks later, he started away to Nantes and scored the only goal of the game, heading in Layvin Kurzawa's cross before half-time for the club's first points of the season. Amidst rumours of a transfer, Falcao was not included in Monaco's next match against Lille, and watched from the stands next to club owner Vadim Vasilyev. Falcao's father later said that Falcao left Monaco because they changed the "original plan" and decided to sell all the players they had bought, mostly referring to the departure of James Rodríguez to Real Madrid.

==== Loan to Manchester United ====
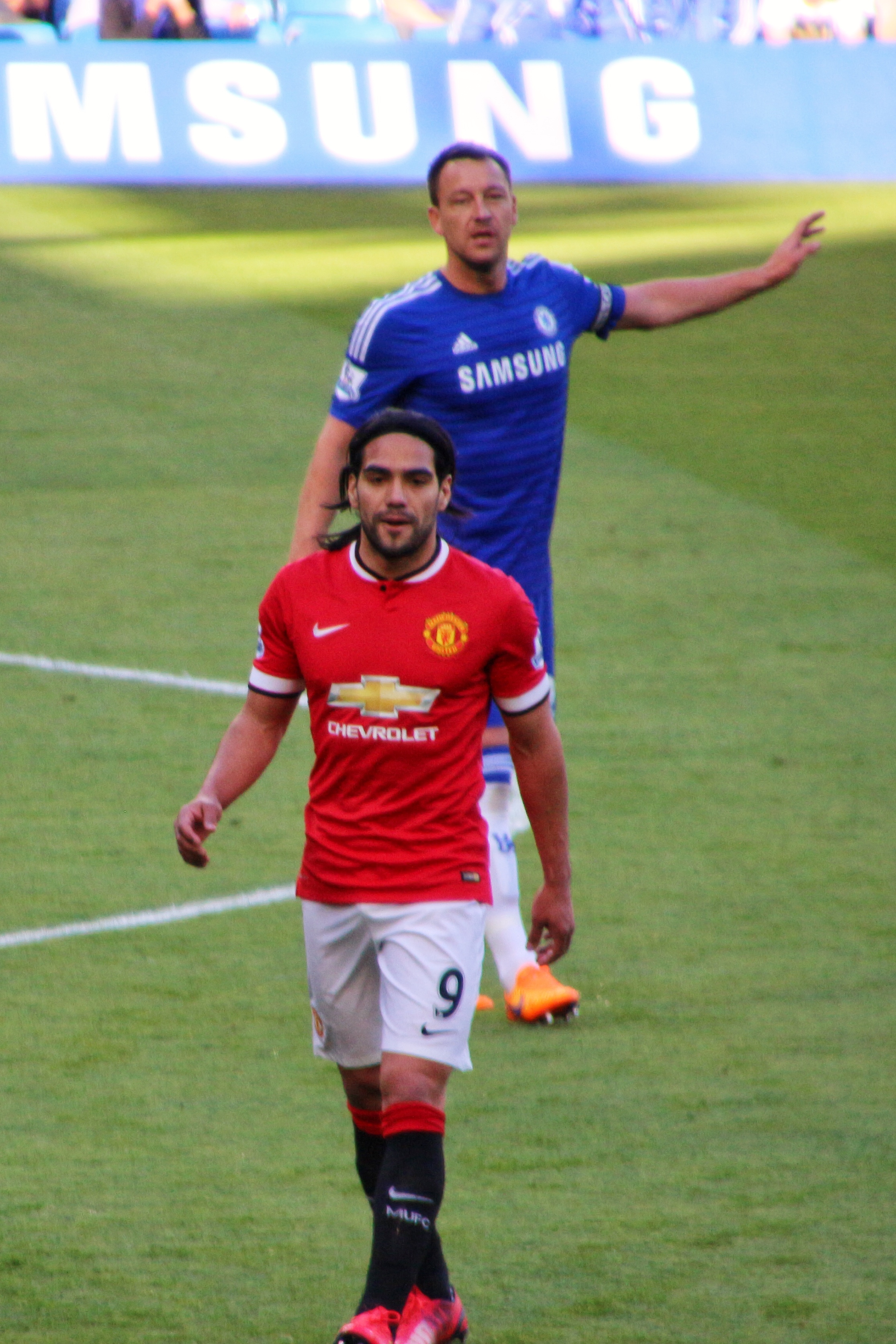
Falcao during a Premier League match against Chelsea in 2015

On 1 September 2014, Manchester United agreed to sign Falcao on a season-long loan for £6 million subject to a medical examination with an option to sign permanently for £43.5 million (€55 million) at season's end. The deal saw him earn £265,000 per week at the club. Manchester City had previously opted out of signing him due to squad size, and he had also been linked to Juventus, Arsenal, and Real Madrid. United confirmed the transfer in the early hours of 2 September. Despite joining temporarily under a loan contract, Falcao said he would fight to stay at United for many years and become a legend at the club. Cristiano Ronaldo praised Falcao and United for the transfer, calling him a "top, quality, very good player", saying that United did "very well" and that he was a "fantastic buy".

Falcao made his debut at Old Trafford on 14 September, playing the final 23 minutes of a 4–0 win over Queens Park Rangers in place of Juan Mata, as United won for the first time in the season. His debut was marked by rapturous applause from the club's supporters as they continuously chanted his name both while he was warming up and on the pitch. On 5 October, he scored his first goal for United, the winner in a 2–1 home victory against Everton. On 8 December, Falcao was left on the bench over 19-year-old James Wilson against Southampton, and Van Gaal later said that Falcao "was only fit enough to play 20 minutes." On 20 December, Falcao made his return for the first time in the starting line-up to score a goal in the second half in a 1–1 draw with Aston Villa. Six days later, he provided an assist for Wayne Rooney against Newcastle United, and United went on to win the match 3–1. On New Year's Day 2015, Falcao equalised against Stoke City in a 1–1 away draw.

Every football player wants to play, that's very normal, but I respect the manager and the decisions he makes. I keep working hard in training, learning every day how to play in different systems, in different styles of football. Manchester United is a great club, I am very happy to be here and because of this I am happy to be patient.

— Falcao in 2015, speaking on his development under Louis van Gaal.

After being left out of the squad against Southampton on 11 January in favor of 19-year-old James Wilson again, Van Gaal said he did not regret making that decision, and furthermore, his future at United was put under doubt when his agent, Jorge Mendes, stated a few days later that his client "may not be at Old Trafford at the start of next season". After failing to offer any shots, either on or off target, and only having 26 touches against League One side Preston North End on 17 February, BBC commentator Martin Keown, described his performance as "another night of nothing from Falcao" and questioned if he was "fit enough". On 10 March, a day after being an unused substitute as United were knocked out of the FA Cup by Arsenal, Falcao played for their under-21 team in a 1–1 draw with Tottenham Hotspur, being substituted after 72 minutes, though Van Gaal said that he didn't "intend to humiliate" Falcao. Diego Maradona also criticised Van Gaal for his treatment of Falcao, saying he was "closer to the devil than anything". At season's end, he was adjudged by many to be among the worst signings of the season. On 24 May 2015, United announced they would not exercise their option to buy Falcao, ending a spell at the club in which he scored 4 goals in 29 appearances.

==== Loan to Chelsea ====
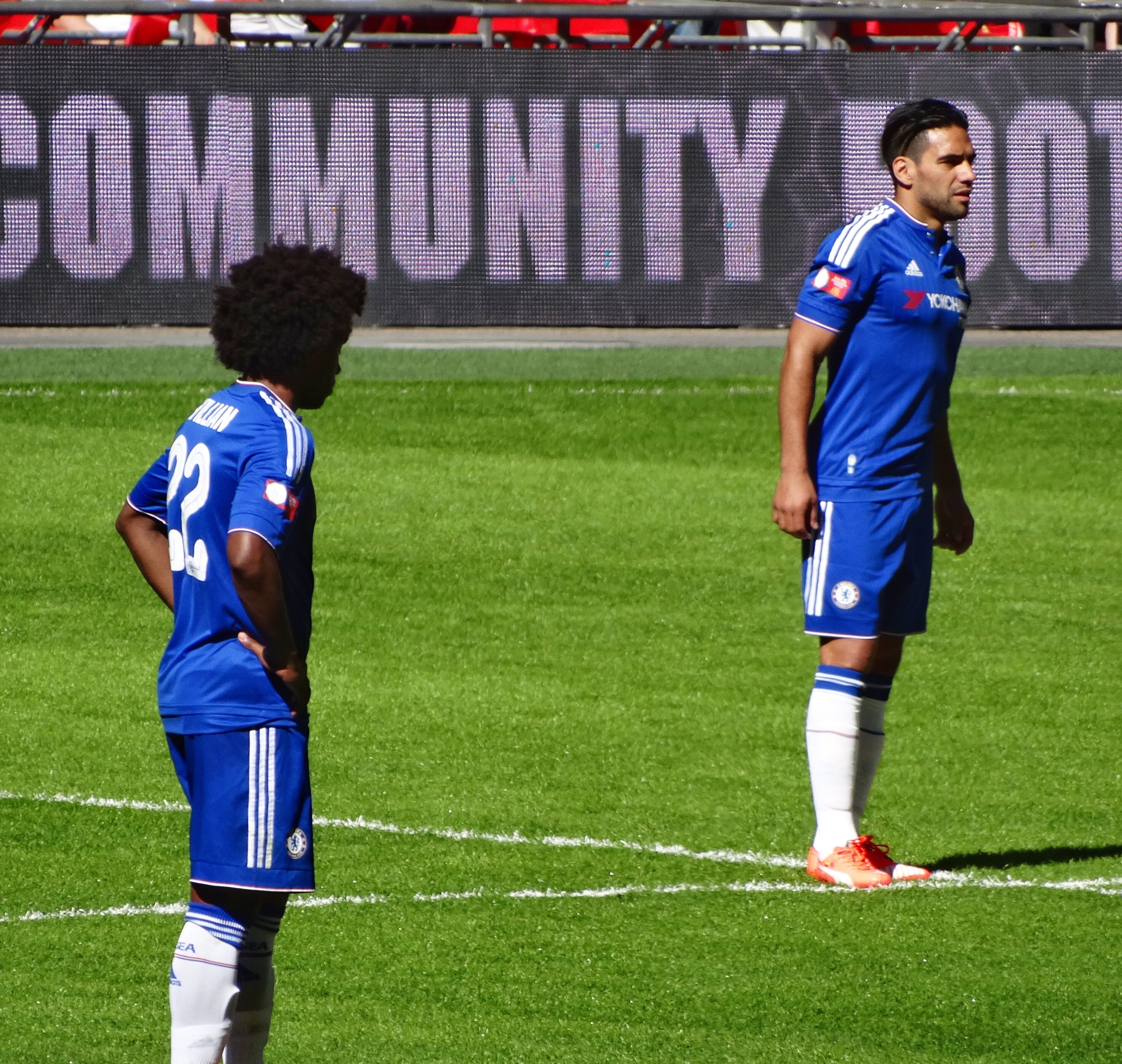
Falcao (right) playing for Chelsea in the 2015 FA Community Shield against Arsenal

On 3 July 2015, Chelsea signed Falcao on a season-long loan deal worth £4 million with the option of a permanent transfer at the end of the season for a fee of £38 million (€50 million), and with a salary of £170,000 a week. The move briefly reunited him with his Colombia teammate Juan Cuadrado and former Atlético Madrid teammates Diego Costa and Thibaut Courtois. Midfielder Mario Pašalić went to Monaco on loan in exchange for Falcao joining Chelsea.

Falcao made his debut on 2 August in the 2015 FA Community Shield at Wembley Stadium, replacing Loïc Rémy at half time as Chelsea lost 1–0 to rivals Arsenal. His league debut came six days later in a 2–2 home draw with Swansea City, playing the final six minutes in place of Willian. On 29 August, again as a replacement for Willian, Falcao scored his first and only Chelsea goal, equalising in an eventual 1–2 home defeat to Crystal Palace. On 3 November, Falcao picked up a muscular injury in training, and was ruled out for a "few weeks". On 30 December, he reinjured his thigh, and new manager Guus Hiddink said he "might be fit again within 10 days, although not to play." However, on 15 January 2016, Hiddink confirmed that Falcao's latest injury setback was "very serious". He was dropped from the team's Champions League squad the following month, in favour of new addition Alexandre Pato.

==== 2016–17 season ====
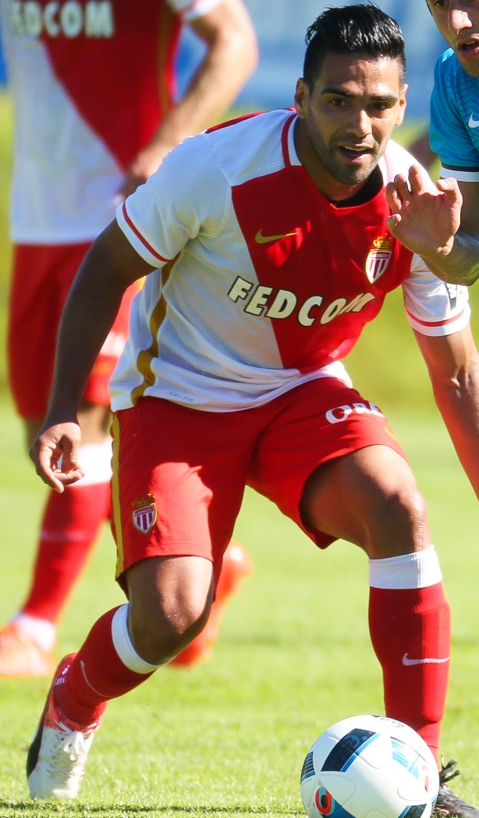
Falcao playing for Monaco in a Ligue 1 match in 2016

Upon Falcao's return to Monaco in July 2016, he was made team captain by coach Leonardo Jardim. On 27 July, Falcao scored for Monaco in his first appearance for the club in two seasons; a Champions League qualifier against Fenerbahçe. On 17 September, he scored his first Ligue 1 goal of the season in a 3–0 win over Stade Rennais at the Stade Louis II. On 5 November, he scored twice in the first half as Monaco defeated Nancy 6–0 in a league match, following his two first-half goals against CSKA Moscow in a Champions League group stage match three days earlier.

On 3 December, he scored two goals against Bastia in a 5–0 win. A week later, on 10 December, Falcao scored his first Ligue 1 hat-trick in a 4–0 win against Bordeaux which boosted his 2016–17 season tally to 14 goals in 15 competitive games, and 10 goals in Ligue 1 with just 579 minutes of Ligue 1 playing time, meaning that Falcao scored an average of one Ligue 1 goal in every 58 minutes of Ligue 1 playing time.

On 4 February 2017, Falcao scored a brace in a 3–0 victory over Nice. A week later, he scored another brace, this time in a 5–0 victory over Metz. On 21 February, Falcao scored two goals; the first with a diving header from Fabinho's cross from the right and the second with a chip over Willy Caballero, but missed a penalty in a 5–3 away loss to Manchester City in the Champions League round of 16 first leg match. Despite him missing out at the second leg at home due to injury, Monaco eventually won the match 3–1 (6–6 on aggregate) and qualified to the quarter-finals on away goals rule. On 19 April, he scored Monaco's second in their 3–1 victory over Borussia Dortmund to put the team into the Champions League semi-finals for the first time since 2004. Falcao scored a brace on the final league matchday in a 4–0 victory against Lille on 14 May. Falcao ended the season claiming the Ligue 1 title and as the club's top scorer with 30 goals in 43 appearances. On 1 June, Falcao extended his contract a further three years, keeping him at the club until 2020.

==== 2017–18 season ====
Falcao started off the season with a goal in Monaco's first league match, Monaco's second in a 3–2 win at home to Toulouse. Two weeks later, he scored the first hat-trick of the Ligue 1 season in a 4–1 win against Dijon. He then scored the only goal against Metz, and a week later scored a double – including a penalty – against Marseille, raising his tally to seven goals in four matches. Falcao's form led him to being nominated for 2017 Ballon d'Or. After losing a match 4–0 at the hands of OGC Nice, Falcao responded with two more braces against Strasbourg and Lille respectively. Upon scoring for Monaco against former club FC Porto in a Champions League game in December 2017, Falcao refused to celebrate out of respect to his former club. He was applauded by Porto fans for the gesture. Five days later, he opened his mark in the Coupe de la Ligue match vs Caen, which ended in a 2–0 win. On 31 January 2018, he scored a double against Montpellier at the Stade Louis II to help send Monaco to the final, where Monaco eventually lost 3–0 to PSG. Falcao finished the season as top scorer with 18 league goals in 26 matches.

==== 2018–19 season ====
Falcao began the season on a high note during Monaco's first match of the season, assisting Monaco's second and scoring their third in a 3–1 away victory against Nantes. He scored the decisive goal in a 1–0 victory against Caen on 24 November 2018, a free-kick which ended Monaco's winless streak of 13 games. Four days later, Falcao played against his former club Atlético Madrid for the first time since his departure in 2013 as part of a Champions League group stage match. Monaco eventually lost 2–0, and Falcao missed a penalty. On 4 December 2018, Falcao scored two penalties in an 0–2 away win against Amiens. On 22 January 2019, Falcao opened his tally in the Coupe de France, scoring in a 1–3 loss to Metz. Despite Falcao's goal, Monaco were eliminated from the competition. Although he finished as Monaco's top scorer with 16 goals across all competitions, this was certainly a season to forget for the club, as they barely avoided relegation and finished in 17th place.

=== Galatasaray ===
==== 2019–20 season ====
On 2 September 2019, Falcao joined Süper Lig club Galatasaray on a free transfer, as his contract with Monaco had expired, with a three-year contract and a salary of €5 million per year. He was welcomed by over 25,000 fans on the previous day at the Istanbul Atatürk Airport. He scored a goal on his debut in a 1–0 home win against Kasimpasa on 13 September. In a Turkish Cup match against Tuzlaspor on 17 December, he scored a goal to help his team make it to the next round and overturn a 0–2 first leg loss. On 28 December, he scored his first brace with the club in a 5–0 win over Antalyaspor at home. On 1 March 2020, he scored his first brace of the year against Gençlerbirliği in a 3–0 win at the Türk Telekom Stadium.

Falcao played 22 matches, scored 11 goals, and had one assist in all competitions during the season.

==== 2020–21 season ====
Falcao began the season by scoring twice and assisting in his club's league debut victory against Gaziantep on 12 September 2020. On 11 April 2021, Falcao collided with Kerem Aktürkoğlu head-on during a training session and was taken to the hospital. He was diagnosed with a facial bone fracture and had surgery. After 2 weeks, he started training with a mask.

He finished the season with 17 games, 9 goals and 2 assists. Falcao missed 24 games during the season due to injuries.

==== 2021–22 season ====
In an official statement made by Galatasaray on 1 September 2021, Falcao and the club mutually agreed to terminate the player's contract.

The Colombian striker's time at Galatasaray was plagued with injuries. He missed 49 matches during his time at the Turkish club, (24 in 2019–20, 25 in 2020–21), and played 43 out of 92 possible games.

=== Rayo Vallecano ===
On 4 September 2021, Falcao signed for La Liga club Rayo Vallecano. He was presented at the Estadio de Vallecas on 16 September 2021 before 2,000 fans. Falcao chose to the jersey number 3, an unfamiliar number mostly worn by defenders and is not traditionally associated with attacking players. His decision to don that jersey was to honour his late father Radamel García, who played as a defender and mostly played with that jersey number. The number 3 jersey was being worn by Fran García at Rayo Vallecano before his arrival, however García agreed and switched to the number 33 to make that available for him. He made his debut with Rayo in a home fixture versus Getafe CF on 18 September 2021, scoring one goal in a 3–0 win. Falcao scored the only goal in a famous league win over Barcelona on 27 October. The result led to the sacking of Barcelona manager Ronald Koeman.

=== Millonarios ===
On 20 June 2024, Falcao returned to Colombia and joined Millonarios. In a league match against Patriotas Boyacá on 1 September, he scored his first goal for Millonarios as a tribute to one of its fans, who died of euthanasia one day earlier. Although on 21 January 2025 Millonarios informed that Falcao's contract with the club would not be renewed in spite of the willingness of both parties to extend their link for the 2025 season, given that a deal to compensate for the player's tax obligations (income and patrimony taxes) could not be reached, seven days later the club confirmed that the player ultimately renewed his contract for a further six months. In his first season with Millonarios, Falcao played 16 league matches, half of them as a starter, and scored five goals. He also suffered two injuries: a fractured finger that ruled him out for a month and shortly later a calf injury that sidelined him for a further two months.

Falcao's departure from Millonarios was announced by the club on 2 July 2025, following the end of the 2025 Apertura tournament and after controversial statements by the player at a press conference at the conclusion of the team's final match in the tournament against Santa Fe. In his last season with Millonarios, Falcao played 13 matches and scored six goals.

On 7 January 2026, after six months as a free agent, Falcao rejoined Millionarios ahead of the 2026 season.

== International career ==
=== Youth level and early international career ===
Falcao participated with the Colombia national under-17 team at the 2001 South American U-17 Championship, where he played four matches and scored one goal against Bolivia. He was also called up to the U-17 team for the 2003 FIFA U-17 World Championship, but sustained an injury before the tournament and had to drop out.

In 2003, Falcao received his first call-up to the under-20 team for a friendly match against Venezuela at Copa Simón Bolívar. He played in the 2004 Toulon Tournament, scoring his only goal at the tournament against Turkey. In the 2005 South American U-20 Championship, where he was champion with his team, he played five matches and scored once on 23 January in the 1–1 draw against Argentina. In the 2005 FIFA World Youth Championship, Falcao played three matches and scored twice, against Canada and Syria.

On 7 February 2007, Falcao debuted for the Colombian senior squad in a friendly match against Uruguay. He scored his first goal on 3 June against Montenegro at the Kirin Cup. The same year on 13 October, Falcao played his first goalless competitive match in a goalless 2010 World Cup qualification draw against Brazil.

Falcao did not participate in the 2010 FIFA World Cup qualification matches against Chile and Paraguay due to an injury he suffered while playing for River Plate. He returned to action and scored the only goal of the game in a friendly match against Nigeria on 19 November 2008. On 10 June 2009, Falcao scored the only goal of the same tournament match in a victory against Peru at Estadio Atanasio Girardot. In total, Falcao played 10 games and scored once during the qualifying campaign.

=== 2011–2013: First Copa América and World Cup qualification ===
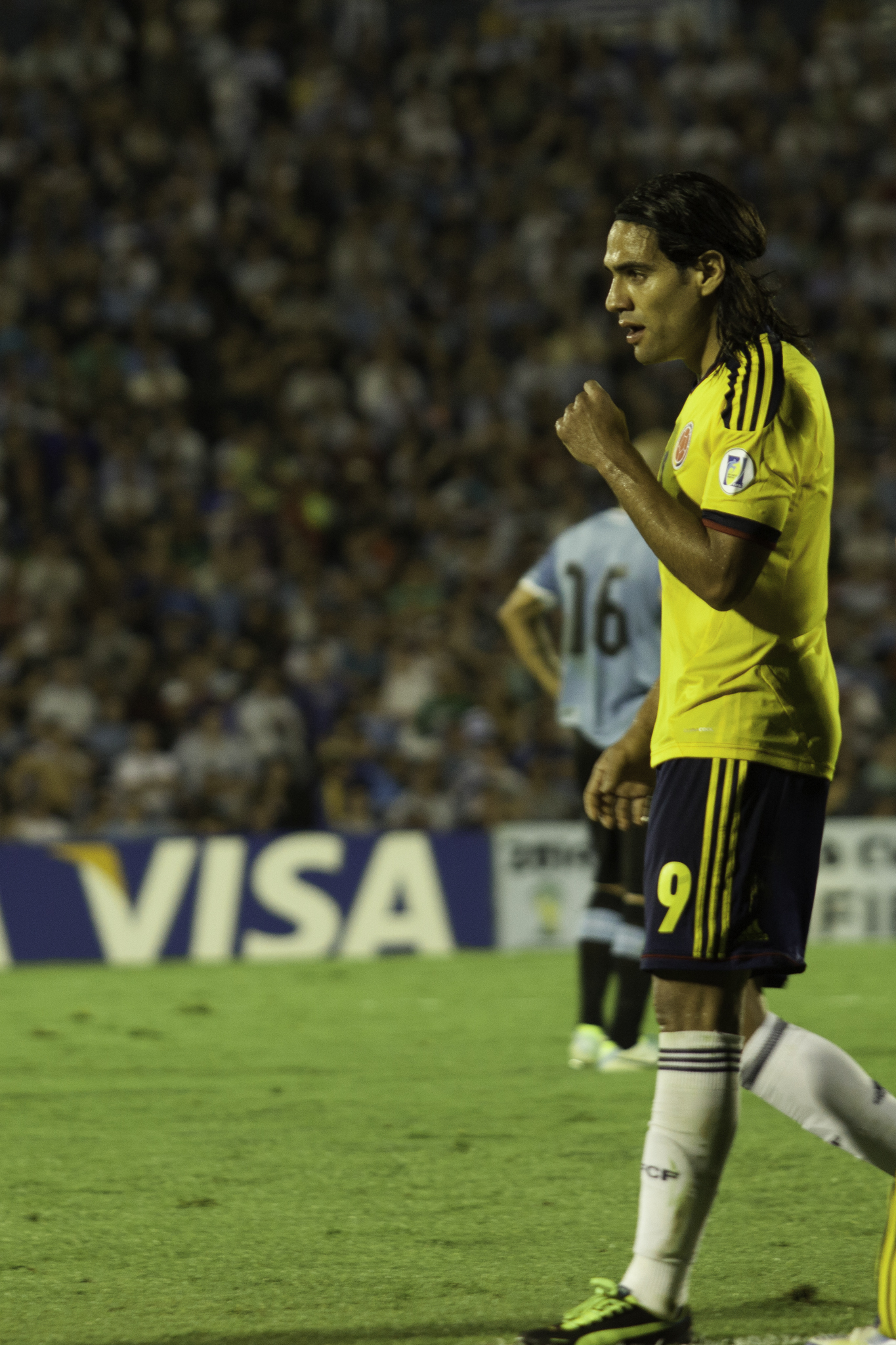
Falcao playing in a World Cup qualifier for Colombia against Uruguay in 2013

After missing the 2007 edition due to injuries, Falcao's first major international tournament was the 2011 Copa América in Argentina. After failing to score against Costa Rica and the hosts, he netted both goals in a 2–0 win against Bolivia, the second a penalty, leading Colombia to top their group. In the quarter-finals, Falcao missed a penalty kick against Peru, which would have won the game had it gone in, and the opponents were able to score two goals in extra time to eliminate his team.

Falcao's first match in the 2014 FIFA World Cup qualifiers started off with a goal against Bolivia in the last minute of added time, giving Colombia the win on 11 October 2011 at the Estadio Hernando Siles. Under new management of the national team led by Argentine José Pékerman, Falcao scored a goal against Mexico in a friendly that ended 2–0. On 7 September 2012, Falcao scored a header in the second minute to help Colombia win 4–0 against Uruguay. In the same match, he assisted Juan Camilo Zúñiga, for Colombia's fourth goal in the final minutes of stoppage time. Falcao scored again days later and assisted Teófilo Gutiérrez against Chile to help give Colombia a 3–1 away win after having trailed 0–1 in Santiago. This result put Los Cafeteros second in the table, one point behind Argentina. On 12 October 2012, Falcao scored both goals in a 2–0 victory over Paraguay.

In Falcao's first game of 2013, he scored the fourth goal during a 5–0 qualifier victory against Bolivia in March. Falcao scored a penalty against Peru in the 13th minute where Colombia won 2–0. On 11 October 2013, in the penultimate World Cup qualifying match against Chile, Falcao scored two penalties to tie 3–3 after trailing 3–0. This result ensured Colombia qualified for the World Cup for the first time since 1998. Falcao ended the 2014 FIFA World Cup qualification campaign as Colombia's top scorer, with nine goals in thirteen appearances.

=== 2014–2016: ACL injury and World Cup absence ===
"When they told me at first that I had a serious injury and there was only a small chance of participating (in Brazil), I didn't care whether it was 10, 20 or 50 percent; I was counting on THAT chance. This is my hope and with this dream, I will work every day. A lot has to do with my emotional state. This is something that I can manage each day."

— Falcao on his injury and a possible chance to make it to the 2014 FIFA World Cup.

On 23 January 2014, due to a severe ACL injury, it was announced that Falcao would likely miss the World Cup. However, Falcao expressed his optimism, believing that it was possible to make a speedy recovery. Falcao received tremendous support worldwide on social media for a speedy recovery; a social media movement entitled 'Fuerza Tigre' (meaning 'stay strong Tiger' in Spanish) rapidly grew popularity. Among those who wished him a quick recovery was Pau Gasol, professional basketball player in the NBA. Juan Manuel Santos, former president of Colombia, visited Falcao in the hospital he was staying at in Porto.

On 5 February, Falcao was included in José Pékerman's initial 30-man squad for the World Cup. In mid-May, Falcao's father, Radamel García, told RCN Radio that Falcao was "60 percent fit, but not fully match-fit". In March, his surgeon said there was "no reason why Falcao couldn't play at the World Cup". On 25 May, Falcao arrived in Argentina to train with the rest of the squad. However, he eventually made the decision not to join the squad as he did not feel right taking up a position if not at full health, and was left out of the final 23-man-squad on 2 June.

Falcao would score his first international goal in 11 months against El Salvador on 10 October 2014, after starting for the first time since his ACL injury. It was his first ever headed goal for his country while influencing the other two goals in a 3–0 victory. His last goal before the injury was in a 2–0 friendly victory against Belgium in November 2013. In a friendly against Bahrain on 26 March 2015, Falcao assisted one goal and scored a double in a 6–0 win. Four days later, he scored his 24th goal for the country and put himself one goal shy of equalling Arnoldo Iguarán's record with a penalty in a 3–1 win over Kuwait.

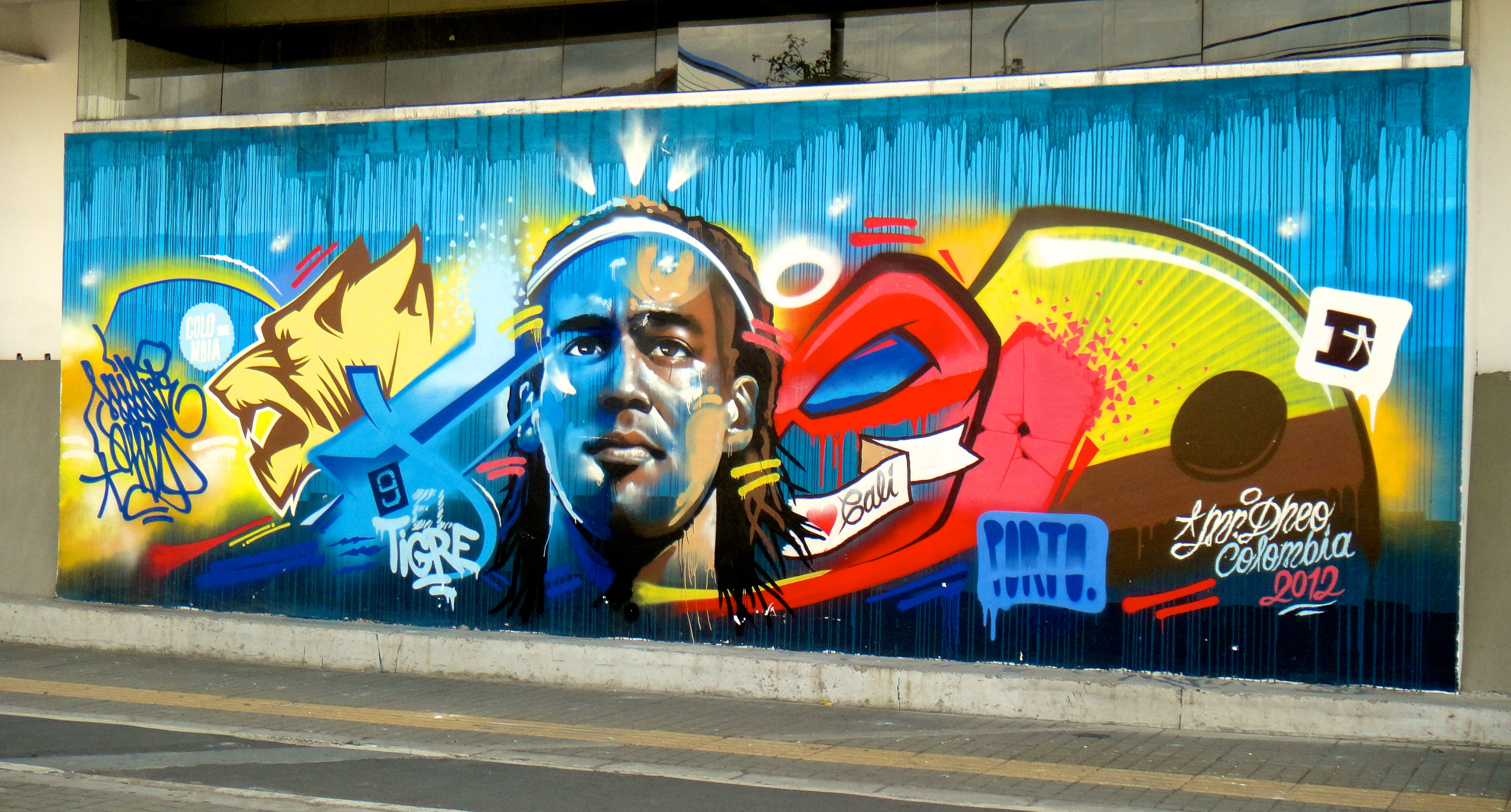
A mural of Falcao in Cali, Colombia

On 6 June, he tied the record as Colombia's all-time top scorer by scoring his 25th goal in a 1–0 friendly victory against Costa Rica in Buenos Aires ahead of the 2015 Copa América. He captained the team at the tournament, despite having a shoddy season, but failed to score and grab any assists in three group matches. He didn't start the quarter-final against Argentina on 26 June, and came on as a substitute for Jackson Martínez in the 74th minute; Colombia ended up losing 5–4 on penalties.

On 4 November 2016, Falcao was recalled to the Colombia squad for the first time in 388 days for Colombia's next two 2018 FIFA World Cup qualifying matches against Chile on 10 November and Argentina on 15 November. He had last played for Colombia on 13 October 2015, in a 3–0 loss to Uruguay in a 2018 World Cup qualifying match in Montevideo, and had not been selected in Colombia's squad for the Copa América Centenario.

=== 2017–2023: All-time top goalscorer, first World Cup and 2019 Copa América ===
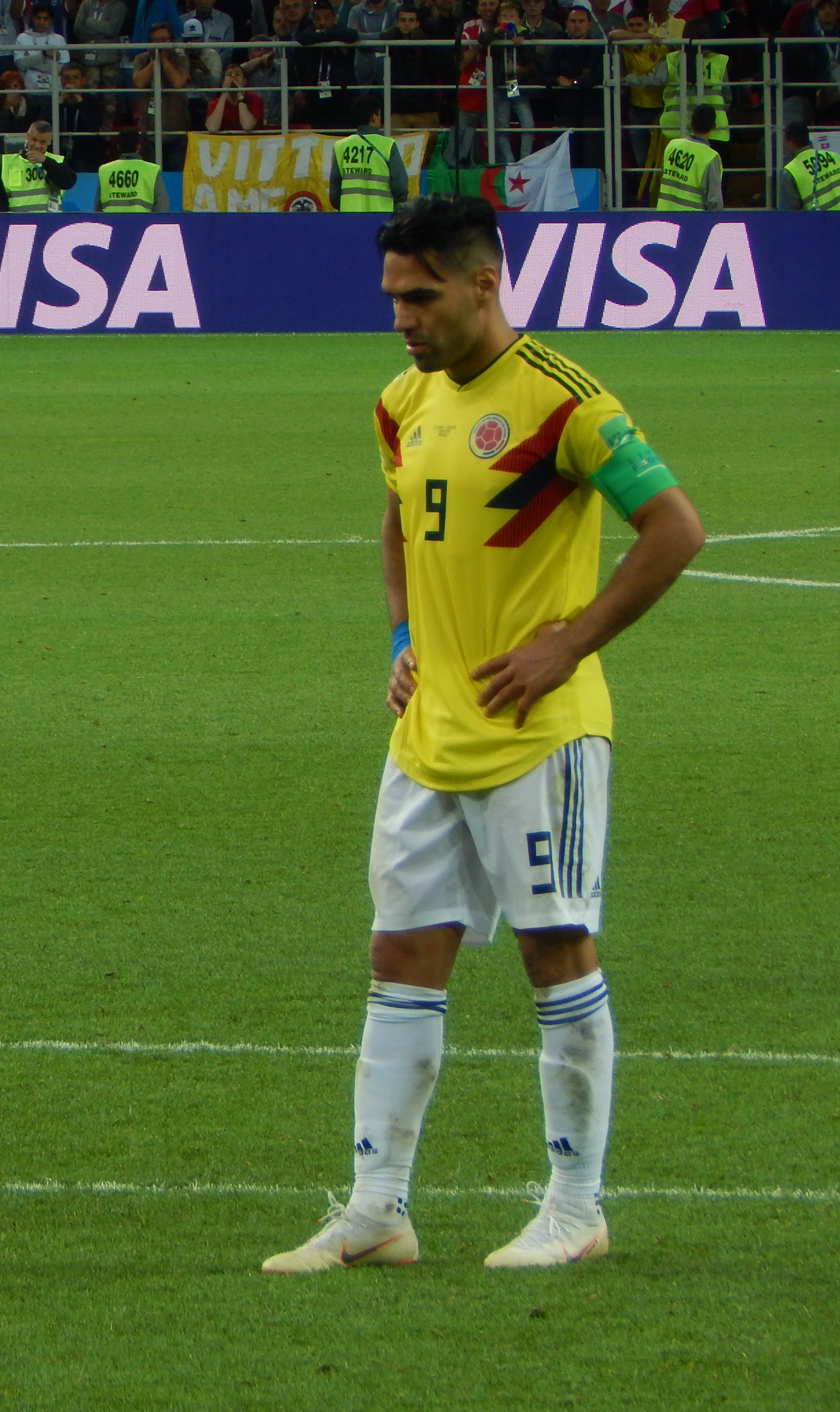
Falcao during the penalty shoot-out in the 2018 World Cup round of 16 match against England

On 7 June 2017, Falcao became the Colombia national team's all-time top-goalscorer, scoring his 26th goal in a 2–2 draw with Spain. He went on to score twice in the team's four remaining World Cup qualifying matches, as Colombia confirmed their qualification for the 2018 FIFA World Cup on 10 October 2017. The last qualifying match against Peru ended up in a 1–1 draw, a result that sent Colombia through automatically and Peru into a play-off with New Zealand at Chile's expense as they lost to Brazil. Footage emerged of Falcao talking to the Peruvian players in what was suggested could be an alleged "pact" to see both teams through. Peruvian midfielder Renato Tapia admitted to the speculation by saying that the Colombians approached them about the draw as they knew the results of the other games. Falcao admitted to knowing what was happening in the other games, but denied making any arrangement.

Having missed the previous World Cup due to injury, Falcao made his World Cup debut against Japan on 19 June, in Colombia's first group game of the 2018 World Cup, with Colombia losing 1–2. On 24 June, Falcao scored his first World Cup goal in Colombia's 3–0 win over Poland. After his goal, Falcao left the field to a standing ovation, and Colombia's manager, José Pékerman, stated after the game: "I think (Falcao's goal) is one of the greatest joys that we received tonight. He is a symbol of the national team, a symbol of Colombian football." Following a 1–1 draw with England in the round of 16, although Falcao converted his penalty in the shoot-out, Colombia lost 4–3.

On 30 May 2019, Falcao was included in the 23-man final Colombia squad for the 2019 Copa América. He had a poor tournament overall, with no goals or assists to his name, and didn't play the full 90 minutes in any of his matches. Colombia eventually lost 5–4 on penalties to Chile in the quarter-finals.

On 24 September 2022, he played his 100th match with Colombia in a friendly match against Guatemala.

== Style of play ==
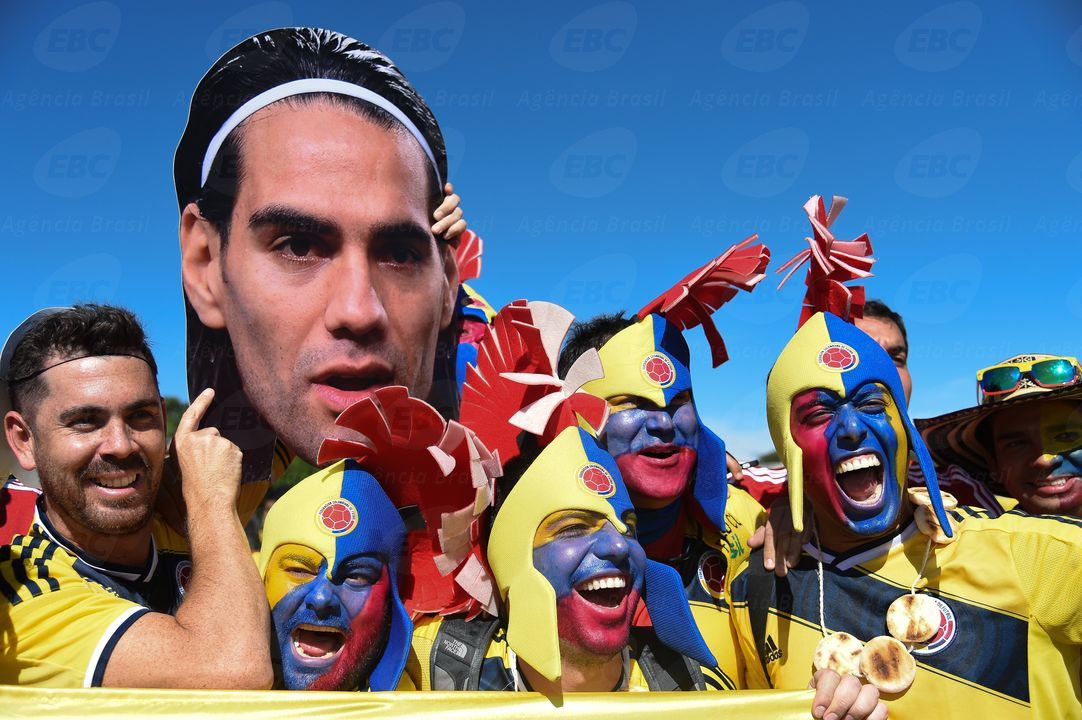
Colombian fans cheering with a Falcao placard during the 2014 World Cup

Nicknamed "El Tigre" (The Tiger), Falcao has been described as a "natural goal scorer" and a striker with the "ability to bag a goal from nothing". He can hold up the ball well due to his high strength and is able to play off the shoulder of the last defender. Described as a "poacher", Falcao is frequently labeled as a "pure striker", often playing as a traditional "number 9" and capitalizing on less amount of chances than the typical goal scorer. His powerful and accurate shots are highly noticeable throughout his games regardless of distance and/or positions, and he is also known to have a tendency to take curved and chip shots. Falcao is well known for having a strong weak foot (left) that is on equals with his right foot (preference), allowing him to be flexible with goal scoring. Falcao controls a well-balanced pace, helping him keep his stamina in check and allowing him to often outrun other players in the most critical 50/50 moments. While Falcao is only of average height (1.77 m), his heading and jumping technique has given him an edge in aerial battles for balls. Falcao has also been praised for his free-kick ability, which is rarely seen from a striker.

Falcao is often regarded as one of the best strikers of his generation and as one of the greatest Colombian players of all time. In his prime before his ACL injury, he was widely considered the best striker in the world. According to Goal, Falcao "had a decent claim to be the most lethal goal-scorer in world football" for a period during the 2010s. His talents have been recognized by many footballers and managers. Former Atlético Madrid president Enrique Cerezo thought Falcao was the "best striker in the world" and that he "wouldn't swap him for Cristiano Ronaldo or Lionel Messi". Former Barcelona and current Manchester City manager Pep Guardiola described him as "sensational" and as one of the most talented in the world. Before Falcao's ACL injury, Fabio Capello considered him to be on the same level as Lionel Messi and Cristiano Ronaldo. Hernán Crespo said Falcao was the best of "human players", also mentioning that Ronaldo and Messi are "on another level". Former Atlético Madrid teammate Gabi said in 2012 that he thought Falcao was the best at heading the ball and finishing in the world. Messi spoke highly on him: he said, "Falcao is a great player: his quality on the ball and the way he shoots are really impressive."

I'd like to play with him. Falcao is a great player and is at a very high level. He has won everything in a season in which he scored many goals. He is, today, the great reference of Colombian football.

— Lionel Messi, June 2011.

Falcao has also influenced numerous younger players of the next generation through not only his style of play but leadership and professionalism as well. Argentinian footballer, Lautaro Martínez, declared that Radamel Falcao was his childhood idol and the player who "inspired" him in every aspect. French footballer, Kylian Mbappé, has stated, "He was like a teacher to me. He’s someone who always wants to score, but he left me the space to express myself. I think I'm the luckiest player in our squad, because I'm at the start of my career and get to play alongside a top striker like Radamel. He's made his mark on the history of the game and scored a huge number of goals." Mbappé after playing with Falcao would go on to become one of the best players and forwards in the world.

== Outside football ==
=== Personal life ===
Falcao's signature

Falcao is a second generation footballer; his father, Radamel García, played professionally as a defender in Colombia and Venezuela, and moved to the latter country with the family when Falcao was five. García died on 3 January 2019, aged 61, due to cardiac arrest while playing tennis. In 2021, when Falcao joined Rayo Vallecano he chose the jersey number 3, same jersey number his father played with, to honour him. When Falcao was in Venezuela, he played baseball, the country's most popular sport. However, when the family returned to Colombia in 1995, Falcao turned his attention back to football. Falcao also has two younger sisters.

His name derives from the 1980s Brazil national team, Internacional and Roma legend Paulo Roberto Falcão, as a tribute from his father, Radamel García. Despite being named Radamel, he prefers to use his middle name in interviews. His nickname, "El Tigre" (Spanish for "The Tiger"), was given by Gonzalo Ludueña, his then-teammate at River Plate. Falcao scored two goals in a match versus Huracán, and the man of the match trophy he later won had a tiger on it, so Ludueña began to call him "El Tigre". Falcao has been married to Argentine singer and model Lorelei Tarón since December 2007. In early 2013, it was revealed that Falcao was expecting his first child with her. The girl was born on 13 August 2013, at the Princess Grace Hospital in La Colle, Monaco. His second daughter was born in February 2015. His third daughter was born in August 2017. In December 2018, Falcao remarried his wife. In March 2020, both Falcao and Lorelei revealed that they were expecting their fourth child on social media. Their first son and fourth child was born in September 2020. In July 2023, Falcao and Lorelei had their fifth child. Due to his wife's Polish ancestry, his children also hold Polish passports, thanks to Monaco teammate Kamil Glik, who helped with the process. Falcao is a devout Christian, and Gonzalo Ludueña said about his faith that, "We hid from Falcao because he would look for us in every room to take us to church on Sunday, our free day."

He is partially of English descent; George King, (born in Burn), one of his great-grandfathers, emigrated from Selby, North Yorkshire in 1932 with his wife to work as an accountant for the United Fruit Company in Colombia and start a new life. His wife later died in childbirth, so he married a Colombian woman and had five children, including Falcao's grandmother, Denis. King was later murdered in 1960. Owing to this ancestry, Falcao's father attempted to make it easier for his son to play in Europe by obtaining a British passport for him, but this was rejected. His uncle was the telenovela and film actor Herbert King, who died in August 2018.

During Falcao's first few years with River Plate, he briefly studied journalism at the University of Palermo.

=== Legal issues ===
In mid-2017, Falcao was investigated for allegations of tax evasion committed while he was playing for Atlético Madrid from 2011 to 2013. He was accused of using shell companies from the British Virgin Islands, Ireland, and Panama to avoid having to pay image rights taxes, and he was also accused of defrauding around €5.6 million of income earned from image rights. He later pled guilty and paid around €8.2 million. In May 2018, he was given a 16-month suspended sentence and a €9 million fine.

=== Charity work ===
Falcao has donated numerous times to charity organizations and people. In 2013, he convinced Swiss watchmaking company Hublot to donate US$100,000 to a United Nations program in Colombia. In January 2015, he helped a 17-year-old Colombian boy find a heart transplant donor.

== Career statistics ==
=== Club ===
As of match played 12 June 2025

Appearances and goals by club, season and competition
Club	Season	League			National cup (Note: Includes Taça de Portugal, Copa del Rey, Coupe de France, FA Cup, Turkish Cup)		League cup (Note: Includes Taça da Liga, Coupe de la Ligue, EFL Cup)		Continental		Other		Total	
Club	Season	Division	Apps	Goals	Apps	Goals	Apps	Goals	Apps	Goals	Apps	Goals	Apps	Goals
Lanceros Boyacá	1999	Categoría Primera B	1	0	—		—		0	0	—		1	0
Lanceros Boyacá	2000	Categoría Primera B	10	2	—		—		0	0	0	0	10	2
Lanceros Boyacá	Total		11	2	—		—		0	0	0	0	11	2
River Plate	2004–05	Argentine Primera División	4	0	—		—		0	0	—		4	0
River Plate	2005–06	Argentine Primera División	7	7	—		—		0	0	—		7	7
River Plate	2006–07	Argentine Primera División	20	3	—		—		3 (Note: Appearances in Copa Libertadores)	0	—		23	3
River Plate	2007–08	Argentine Primera División	27	11	—		—		12	8	—		39	19
River Plate	2008–09	Argentine Primera División	32	13	—		—		6	3	—		38	16
River Plate	Total		90	34	—		—		21	11	—		111	45
Porto	2009–10	Primeira Liga	28	25	5	5	2	0	8 (Note: Appearances in UEFA Champions League)	4	0	0	43	34
Porto	2010–11	Primeira Liga	22	16	3	3	0	0	16 (Note: Appearance(s) in UEFA Europa League)	18	1 (Note: Appearance in Supertaça Cândido de Oliveira)	1	42	38
Porto	2011–12	Primeira Liga	1	0	—		—		—		1	0	2	0
Porto	Total		51	41	8	8	2	0	24	22	2	1	87	72
Atlético Madrid	2011–12	La Liga	34	24	1	0	—		15	12	—		50	36
Atlético Madrid	2012–13	La Liga	34	28	4	2	—		2	1	1 (Note: Appearance in UEFA Super Cup)	3	41	34
Atlético Madrid	Total		68	52	5	2	—		17	13	1	3	91	70
Monaco	2013–14	Ligue 1	17	9	2	2	0	0	—		—		19	11
Monaco	2014–15	Ligue 1	3	2	0	0	0	0	—		—		3	2
Monaco	2016–17	Ligue 1	29	21	2	1	2	1	10	7	—		43	30
Monaco	2017–18	Ligue 1	26	18	1	0	3	3	5	3	1 (Note: Appearance in Trophée des Champions)	0	36	24
Monaco	2018–19	Ligue 1	33	15	1	1	0	0	5	0	—		39	16
Monaco	Total		108	65	6	4	5	4	20	10	1	0	140	83
Manchester United (loan)	2014–15	Premier League	26	4	3	0	0	0	—		—		29	4
Chelsea (loan)	2015–16	Premier League	10	1	0	0	1	0	0	0	1 (Note: Appearance in FA Community Shield)	0	12	1
Galatasaray	2019–20	Süper Lig	16	10	3	1	—		3	0	—		22	11
Galatasaray	2020–21	Süper Lig	17	9	0	0	—		1	0	—		18	9
Galatasaray	2021–22	Süper Lig	1	0	0	0	—		2 (Note: One appearance in UEFA Champions League, one appearance in UEFA Europa League)	0	—		3	0
Galatasaray	Total		34	19	3	1	0	0	6	0	—		43	20
Rayo Vallecano	2021–22	La Liga	22	6	3	0	—		—		—		25	6
Rayo Vallecano	2022–23	La Liga	27	2	2	0	—		—		—		29	2
Rayo Vallecano	2023–24	La Liga	22	1	4	3	—		—		—		26	4
Rayo Vallecano	Total		71	9	9	3	—		—		—		80	12
Millonarios	2024	Categoría Primera A	16	5	0	0	—		—		—		16	5
Millonarios	2025	Categoría Primera A	12	6	0	0	—		1 (Note: Appearance in Copa Sudamericana)	0	—		13	6
Millonarios	Total		28	11	0	0	—		1	0	—		29	11
Career total			497	243	34	18	8	4	89	56	5	4	633	320

=== International ===
As of match played 28 March 2023

Appearances and goals by national team and year
National team	Year	Apps	Goals
Colombia	2007	8	2
Colombia	2008	5	1
Colombia	2009	9	2
Colombia	2010	4	1
Colombia	2011	8	4
Colombia	2012	7	5
Colombia	2013	9	5
Colombia	2014	3	1
Colombia	2015	9	4
Colombia	2016	2	0
Colombia	2017	6	3
Colombia	2018	11	4
Colombia	2019	8	2
Colombia	2020	2	1
Colombia	2021	6	0
Colombia	2022	5	1
Colombia	2023	2	0
Total		104	36

== Honours ==
River Plate

- Argentine Primera División: 2007–08 Clausura

Porto

- Primeira Liga: 2010–11
- Taça de Portugal: 2009–10, 2010–11
- Supertaça Cândido de Oliveira: 2009, 2010, 2011
- UEFA Europa League: 2010–11

Atlético Madrid

- Copa del Rey: 2012–13
- UEFA Europa League: 2011–12
- UEFA Super Cup: 2012

Monaco

- Ligue 1: 2016–17
- Coupe de la Ligue runner-up: 2016–17, 2017–18
- Trophée des Champions runner-up: 2017

=== Chelsea ===
- FA Community Shield runner-up: 2015

Colombia U20

- South American Youth Championship: 2005

Individual

- South American Team of the Year: 2007
- Portuguese Golden Ball: 2010–11
- UEFA Europa League top scorer: 2010–11 (17 goals), 2011–12 (12 goals)
- UEFA Best Player in Europe 5th place: 2010–11
- UEFA Special Award for most UEFA Europa League/UEFA Cup goals in a season: 2011
- UEFA Europa League final Man of the Match: 2012
- The Guardian European Team of the Year: 2011–12
- Marca La Liga Team of the Season: 2011–12
- Bleacher Report La Liga Player of the Season: 2011–12
- Bleacher Report La Liga Starting XI: 2011–12
- UEFA Super Cup Man of the Match: 2012
- FIFA Ballon d'Or 5th place: 2012
- FIFA FIFPro World11: 2012
- Globe Soccer Best Player of the Year: 2012
- UEFA La Liga Dream Team: 2012–13
- ESPN Best La Liga XI: 2012–13
- UNFP Ligue 1 Player of the Month: August 2017
- Coupe de la Ligue top scorer: 2017–18 (3 goals)

== Records ==
- Youngest player to officially debut in a professional league match of the Colombian Professional Football system, at 13 years and 112 days old. He achieved this on 28 August 1999 in a match between Lanceros Fair Play and Deportivo Pereira during the 1999 Primera B tournament.
- Highest goalscoring effectiveness and impact for a debuting youth striker in the history of River Plate in the 21st century.
- Highest Colombian goalscorer in European football history, surpassing in April 2011 the previous record of 62 goals held by Juan Pablo Ángel at Aston Villa between the 2001 and 2007 seasons. Falcao broke this record in less than two seasons.
- All-time top goalscorer for F.C. Porto in international UEFA competitions.
- Surpassed Jürgen Klinsmann as the top goalscorer in a single season of the UEFA Europa League with 17 goals, two more than the German forward.
- First player in the history of the UEFA Europa League to score three hat-tricks in a single season.
- First Colombian player to score a goal in a final of the UEFA Europa League.
- Most expensive player sold in the history of Porto and the Primeira Liga, as well as the most expensive player purchased in the history of Atlético Madrid, costing 40 million euros. At the time of his signing, this transfer made him the most expensive Colombian footballer in history.
- First Colombian player to score 100 goals in European domestic football leagues.
- First player in the history of the UEFA Europa League to finish as the tournament's top goalscorer in two consecutive seasons, achieving it in the 2010–11 and 2011–12 editions.
- First player to score a goal in two consecutive finals of the UEFA Europa League.
- Only football player in the modern history of Atlético Madrid to score five goals in a single La Liga match.
- All-time top scorer for Atlético Madrid in a single season within international competitions.
- All-time top scorer for Atlético Madrid in a single calendar year within domestic La Liga matches.
- Top goalscorer in the history of Atlético Madrid during the first half (*primera vuelta*) of a La Liga season.
- Fastest player to score 50 league goals in the history of Atlético Madrid, reaching the milestone in just 64 matches.
- All-time top goalscorer for the Colombia national football team, with 36 goals.
- Player with the most goals scored in finals of UEFA club competitions (UEFA Champions League, UEFA Europa League, and UEFA Super Cup) with 6 goals.
- Highest goal-per-game average in the history of UEFA club competitions.
- Joint all-time top goalscorer in the history of the UEFA Super Cup.
- One of only two players in the history of UEFA club competitions to score a hat-trick during the first half of a continental final or title-deciding match (shared with Ferenc Puskás), and the only one to do so in the UEFA Super Cup format.
- Player with the most Ballon d'Or nominations in the history of AS Monaco (2 nominations, achieved in the 2013 and 2017 editions).

== See also ==
- List of top international men's football goalscorers by country
- List of men's footballers with 100 or more international caps
- List of footballers who achieved hat-trick records
