= 2002 UEFA European Under-21 Championship squads =

Football team member listings

Those marked in bold have now been capped at full International level.

== Group 1 ==
=== England ===
Head coach: (England) David Platt

No.	Pos.	Player	Date of birth (age)	Caps	Goals	Club
1	GK	**Paul Robinson**	15 October 1979			(The Football Association) Leeds United
2	DF	**Luke Young**	19 July 1979	17	1	(The Football Association) Charlton Athletic
3	DF	**Paul Konchesky**	15 May 1981	15	0	(The Football Association) Charlton Athletic
4	MF	Sean Davis	20 September 1979	12	1	(The Football Association) Fulham
5	DF	Martin Taylor	9 November 1979	1	0	(The Football Association) Blackburn Rovers
6	DF	**Gareth Barry**	23 February 1981	27	2	(The Football Association) Aston Villa
7	MF	**David Dunn**	27 December 1979	20	3	(The Football Association) Blackburn Rovers
8	MF	Jonathan Greening	2 January 1979	17	3	(The Football Association) Middlesbrough
9	FW	Malcolm Christie	11 April 1979	11	3	(The Football Association) Derby County
10	FW	**Jermain Defoe**	7 October 1982			(The Football Association) West Ham United
11	MF	Jermaine Pennant	15 January 1983	24	0	(The Football Association) Arsenal
12	DF	Chris Riggott	1 September 1980	9	0	(The Football Association) Derby County
13	GK	Stuart Taylor	28 November 1980	3	0	(The Football Association) Arsenal
14	MF	David Prutton	12 September 1981	25	0	(The Football Association) Nottingham Forest
15	MF	**Jermaine Jenas**	18 February 1983	9	0	(The Football Association) Newcastle United
16	MF	**Scott Parker**	13 October 1980	11	0	(The Football Association) Charlton Athletic
17	MF	**Alan Smith**	28 October 1980	10	3	(The Football Association) Leeds United
18	DF	**Zat Knight**	2 May 1980	4	0	(The Football Association) Fulham
19	FW	**Peter Crouch**	30 January 1981	6	1	(The Football Association) Aston Villa
20	FW	**Bobby Zamora**	16 January 1981	6	0	(The Football Association) Brighton & Hove Albion
21	FW	**Shola Ameobi**	12 October 1981	20	7	(The Football Association) Newcastle United
22	GK	Stephen Bywater	7 June 1981	6	0	(The Football Association) West Ham United

=== Italy ===
Head coach: (Italy) Claudio Gentile Caps and age as of 17 May 2002, before the start of the tournament

No.	Pos.	Player	Date of birth (age)	Caps	Goals	Club
1	GK	Generoso Rossi	3 January 1979 (age 23)	12	0	(Italian Football Federation) Venezia
2	DF	**Daniele Bonera**	31 May 1981 (age 20)	12	0	(Italian Football Federation) Brescia
3	DF	Gianpaolo Bellini	27 March 1980 (age 22)	12	0	(Italian Football Federation) Atalanta
4	DF	**Matteo Ferrari**	5 December 1979 (age 22)	23	3	(Italian Football Federation) Internazionale
5	DF	Paolo Cannavaro	26 June 1981 (age 20)	3	0	(Italian Football Federation) Parma
6	MF	Massimo Donati	26 March 1981 (age 21)	13	1	(Italian Football Federation) Milan
7	MF	**Marco Marchionni**	22 July 1980 (age 21)	14	2	(Italian Football Federation) Parma
8	MF	**Matteo Brighi**	14 February 1981 (age 21)	7	0	(Italian Football Federation) Juventus
9	FW	**Massimo Maccarone**	6 September 1979 (age 22)	11	8	(Italian Football Federation) Empoli
10	MF	**Andrea Pirlo** (c)	19 May 1979 (age 22)	36	15	(Italian Football Federation) Milan
11	FW	**Emiliano Bonazzoli**	20 January 1979 (age 23)	14	7	(Italian Football Federation) Parma
12	GK	Vitangelo Spadavecchia	25 November 1982 (age 19)	0	0	(Italian Football Federation) Bari
13	DF	Paolo Castellini	25 March 1979 (age 23)	8	0	(Italian Football Federation) Torino
14	DF	**Dario Dainelli**	9 June 1979 (age 22)	1	0	(Italian Football Federation) Brescia
15	DF	Stefano Lucchini	2 October 1980 (age 21)	10	0	(Italian Football Federation) Ternana
16	DF	Cesare Natali	5 April 1979 (age 23)	0	0	(Italian Football Federation) Atalanta
17	MF	**Manuele Blasi**	17 August 1980 (age 21)	2	0	(Italian Football Federation) Perugia
18	MF	Fabio Gatti	4 January 1982 (age 20)	1	0	(Italian Football Federation) Perugia
19	MF	**Giampiero Pinzi**	11 March 1981 (age 21)	2	0	(Italian Football Federation) Udinese
20	FW	**Andrea Caracciolo**	18 September 1981 (age 20)	0	0	(Italian Football Federation) Brescia
21	FW	**Vincenzo Iaquinta**	21 November 1979 (age 22)	8	1	(Italian Football Federation) Udinese
22	GK	**Ivan Pelizzoli**	18 November 1980 (age 21)	7	0	(Italian Football Federation) Roma

=== Portugal ===
Head coach: Agostinho Oliveira

No.	Pos.	Player	Date of birth (age)	Caps	Goals	Club
1	GK	Sérgio Leite	16 August 1979			(Portuguese Football Federation) Boavista
2	DF	Briguel	8 March 1979			(Portuguese Football Federation) Marítimo
3	DF	Vasco Faisca	27 August 1980			(Italian Football Federation) Vicenza
4	DF	**Tonel**	13 April 1980			(Portuguese Football Federation) Académica de Coimbra
5	DF	**Jorge Ribeiro**	9 November 1981			(Portuguese Football Federation) Benfica
6	MF	**Ednilson**	25 September 1982			(Portuguese Football Federation) Benfica
7	MF	Cândido Costa	30 May 1981			(Portuguese Football Federation) Porto
8	MF	**Hugo Viana**	15 January 1983			(Portuguese Football Federation) Sporting CP
9	FW	**Hélder Postiga**	2 August 1982			(Portuguese Football Federation) Porto
10	MF	Paulo Costa	5 December 1979			(Italian Football Federation) Reggina
11	FW	Filipe Teixeira	2 October 1980			(French Football Federation) Istres
12	GK	Márcio Santos	5 May 1979			(Portuguese Football Federation) Académica de Coimbra
13	DF	**Bruno Alves**	27 November 1981			(Portuguese Football Federation) Farense
14	MF	Alhandra	5 March 1979			(Portuguese Football Federation) Académica de Coimbra
15	FW	**Ariza Makukula**	4 March 1981	14	3	(French Football Federation) Nantes
16	MF	**Tiago**	2 May 1981			(Portuguese Football Federation) Braga
17	MF	**Pedro Mendes**	26 February 1979			(Portuguese Football Federation) Vitória de Guimarães
18	FW	António Semedo	1 June 1979			(Portuguese Football Federation) Estrela da Amadora
19	MF	**Neca**	31 December 1979			(Portuguese Football Federation) Belenenses
20	DF	**Miguel**	4 January 1980			(Portuguese Football Federation) Benfica
21	DF	**Paulo Ferreira**	18 January 1979			(Portuguese Football Federation) Vitória de Setúbal
22	GK	Ivo	4 November 1980			(Portuguese Football Federation) Salgueiros

=== Switzerland ===
Head coach: Bernard Challandes

No.	Pos.	Player	Date of birth (age)	Caps	Goals	Club
1	GK	Nicolas Beney	14 September 1980			(Swiss Football Association) Sion
2	DF	**Rémo Meyer**	12 November 1980	22	1	(Swiss Football Association) Lausanne
3	DF	**Ludovic Magnin**	20 April 1979			(Swiss Football Association) Lugano
4	MF	**Stéphane Grichting**	30 March 1979			(Swiss Football Association) Sion
5	DF	**Stephan Keller**	31 May 1979	4	0	(Swiss Football Association) Zürich
6	MF	Roman Friedli	13 March 1979	20	0	(Swiss Football Association) Aarau
7	MF	Elvir Melunović	17 July 1979	29	4	(Swiss Football Association) Grasshopper
8	DF	Reto Zanni	9 February 1980	23	1	(Swiss Football Association) St. Gallen
9	FW	**Daniel Gygax**	28 August 1981			(Swiss Football Association) Aarau
10	MF	**Ricardo Cabanas**	17 January 1979			(Swiss Football Association) Grasshopper
11	FW	**Alexander Frei**	15 July 1979			(Swiss Football Association) Servette
12	GK	Thierry Bally	9 September 1979			(Swiss Football Association) Luzern
13	DF	**Mario Eggimann**	24 January 1981			(Swiss Football Association) Aarau
14	DF	Luca Denicola	17 April 1981	7	0	(Swiss Football Association) Grasshopper
15	DF	**Alain Rochat**	1 February 1983			(Swiss Football Association) Yverdon Sport
16	MF	Pascal Oppliger	1 April 1980			(Swiss Football Association) Neuchâtel Xamax
17	MF	Ivan Previtali	22 October 1979			(Swiss Football Association) Kriens
18	MF	Mario Raimondi	10 July 1980	4	0	(Swiss Football Association) Thun
19	FW	Johann Berisha	6 September 1979	12	1	(Swiss Football Association) Young Boys
20	FW	Rainer Bieli	22 February 1979			(Swiss Football Association) St. Gallen
21	FW	**André Muff**	28 January 1981	27	8	(Swiss Football Association) Luzern
22	GK	Reto Bolli	2 March 1979			(Swiss Football Association) Schaffhausen

== Group 2 ==
=== Belgium ===
Head coach: Jean-François De Sart

No.	Pos.	Player	Date of birth (age)	Caps	Goals	Club
1	GK	**Jean-François Gillet**	31 May 1979			(Italian Football Federation) Bari
2	DF	Wouter Vrancken	3 February 1979			(Royal Belgian Football Association) Racing Genk
3	DF	Jonas De Roeck	20 December 1979			(Royal Belgian Football Association) Royal Antwerp
4	DF	**Birger Maertens**	6 April 1980			(Royal Belgian Football Association) Club Brugge
5	DF	Vincent Lachambre	6 November 1980			(Royal Dutch Football Association) Roda JC
6	MF	Sven Vandenbroeck	22 September 1979			(Royal Dutch Football Association) Roda JC
7	MF	Davy Theunis	28 January 1980			(Royal Belgian Football Association) Beveren
8	MF	Kevin Van Dessel	9 April 1979			(Royal Dutch Football Association) Roda JC
9	FW	Björn De Wilde	1 May 1979			(Royal Belgian Football Association) Eendracht Aalst
10	FW	**Tom Soetaers**	21 July 1980			(Royal Dutch Football Association) Roda JC
11	MF	**Christophe Grégoire**	20 April 1980			(Royal Belgian Football Association) Mouscron
12	GK	Olivier Renard	24 May 1979			(Royal Belgian Football Association) Standard Liège
13	DF	Stefan Teelen	10 April 1979			(Royal Belgian Football Association) Racing Genk
14	DF	**Önder Turacı**	14 July 1981			(Royal Belgian Football Association) La Louviere
15	MF	Tim Reigel	28 October 1980			(Royal Belgian Football Association) Eendracht Aalst
16	FW	**Thomas Chatelle**	31 March 1981			(Royal Belgian Football Association) Racing Genk
17	MF	Peter Delorge	14 April 1980			(Royal Belgian Football Association) Sint-Truidense
18	MF	Gonzague Vandooren	19 August 1979			(Royal Belgian Football Association) Standard Liège
19	MF	**Grégory Dufer**	19 December 1981			(Royal Belgian Football Association) Charleroi
20	MF	**Koen Daerden**	8 March 1982			(Royal Belgian Football Association) Racing Genk
21	FW	**Stein Huysegems**	16 June 1982			(Royal Belgian Football Association) Lierse
22	GK	Cliff Mardulier	22 September 1982			(Royal Belgian Football Association) Lierse

=== Czech Republic ===
Head coach: (Czech Republic) Miroslav Beránek

No.	Pos.	Player	Date of birth (age)	Caps	Goals	Club
1	GK	**Jaroslav Drobný**	18 October 1979			(Hellenic Football Federation) Panionios
2	DF	**Martin Jiránek**	25 May 1979			(Italian Football Federation) Reggina
3	DF	Martin Horák	16 September 1980			(Football Association of the Czech Republic) Sigma Olomouc
4	MF	**Petr Voříšek**	19 March 1979			(Football Association of the Czech Republic) Teplice
5	DF	**Zdeněk Grygera**	14 May 1980			(Football Association of the Czech Republic) Sparta Prague
6	DF	**Václav Drobný**	9 September 1980			(Football Association of the Czech Republic) Chmel Blšany
7	MF	David Kobylík	27 June 1981			(Football Association of the Czech Republic) Sigma Olomouc
8	FW	**Milan Baroš**	28 October 1981			(The Football Association) Liverpool
9	MF	**Lukáš Zelenka**	5 October 1979			(Football Association of the Czech Republic) Sparta Prague
10	MF	**Štěpán Vachoušek**	26 July 1979			(Football Association of the Czech Republic) Teplice
11	MF	Michal Pospíšil	3 May 1979			(Football Association of the Czech Republic) Sparta Prague
12	FW	**Tomáš Jun**	17 January 1983			(Football Association of the Czech Republic) Sparta Prague
13	MF	**Karel Piták**	28 January 1980			(Football Association of the Czech Republic) Hradec Králové
14	DF	**David Rozehnal**	5 July 1980			(Football Association of the Czech Republic) Sigma Olomouc
15	MF	**Jan Polák**	14 March 1981			(Football Association of the Czech Republic) Brno
16	GK	**Petr Čech**	20 May 1982			(Football Association of the Czech Republic) Sparta Prague
17	DF	**Tomáš Hübschman**	4 September 1981			(Football Association of the Czech Republic) Sparta Prague
18	FW	Libor Žůrek	2 November 1979			(Football Association of the Czech Republic) Baník Ostrava
19	FW	**Rudolf Skácel**	17 July 1979			(Football Association of the Czech Republic) Hradec Králové
20	MF	**Radoslav Kováč**	27 November 1979			(Football Association of the Czech Republic) Sigma Olomouc
21	MF	Tomáš Hrdlička	17 February 1982			(Football Association of the Czech Republic) Slavia Prague
22	GK	**Aleš Chvalovský**	29 May 1979			(Football Association of the Czech Republic) Chmel Blšany

=== France ===
Head coach: Raymond Domenech

No.	Pos.	Player	Date of birth (age)	Caps	Goals	Club
1	GK	**Mickaël Landreau**	14 May 1979			(French Football Federation) Nantes
2	DF	**Anthony Réveillère**	10 November 1979			(French Football Federation) Rennes
3	DF	**Julien Escudé**	17 August 1979			(French Football Federation) Rennes
4	DF	**Jean-Alain Boumsong**	14 December 1979			(French Football Federation) Auxerre
5	MF	Mathieu Berson	23 February 1980			(French Football Federation) Nantes
6	DF	**Jérémie Bréchet**	14 August 1979			(French Football Federation) Lyon
7	MF	Olivier Sorlin	9 April 1979			(French Football Federation) Montpellier
8	MF	Julien Sablé	11 September 1980			(French Football Federation) Saint-Étienne
9	FW	**Sidney Govou**	27 July 1979			(French Football Federation) Lyon
10	MF	Steed Malbranque	6 January 1980			(The Football Association) Fulham
11	FW	**Péguy Luyindula**	25 May 1979			(French Football Federation) Lyon
12	DF	Sylvain Armand	1 August 1980			(French Football Federation) Nantes
13	FW	Pierre-Alain Frau	15 April 1980			(French Football Federation) Sochaux
14	DF	Matthieu Delpierre	26 April 1981			(French Football Federation) Lille
15	DF	**Philippe Mexès**	30 March 1982			(French Football Federation) Auxerre
16	GK	Damien Gregorini	2 March 1979			(French Football Federation) Marseille
17	DF	David Di Tommaso	6 October 1979			(French Football Federation) Sedan
18	MF	**Benoît Pedretti**	12 November 1980			(French Football Federation) Sochaux
19	MF	**Camel Meriem**	18 October 1979			(French Football Federation) Sochaux
20	MF	Lionel Mathis	4 October 1981			(French Football Federation) Auxerre
21	FW	Cyril Chapuis	21 March 1979			(French Football Federation) Marseille
22	GK	Rémy Vercoutre	26 June 1980			(French Football Federation) Montpellier

=== Greece ===
Head coach: Andreas Michalopoulos

No.	Pos.	Player	Date of birth (age)	Caps	Goals	Club
1	GK	**Stefanos Kotsolis**	5 June 1979			(Hellenic Football Federation) Panathinaikos
2	MF	**Christos Patsatzoglou**	19 March 1979			(Hellenic Football Federation) Olympiacos
3	DF	**Kostas Louboutis**	10 June 1979			(Hellenic Football Federation) Aris
4	MF	**Konstantinos Katsouranis**	21 June 1979			(Hellenic Football Federation) Panachaiki
5	DF	**Efstathios Tavlaridis**	25 January 1980			(The Football Association) Arsenal
6	DF	**Sotirios Kyrgiakos**	23 July 1979			(Hellenic Football Federation) Panathinaikos
7	FW	**Ioannis Amanatidis**	3 December 1981			(German Football Association) Greuther Fürth
8	DF	**Giourkas Seitaridis**	4 June 1981			(Hellenic Football Federation) Panathinaikos
9	FW	**Dimitrios Papadopoulos**	20 October 1981			(The Football Association) Burnley
10	MF	**Giorgos Theodoridis**	3 July 1980			(Hellenic Football Federation) Aris
11	FW	Georgios Kazantzis	2 February 1979			(Hellenic Football Federation) Aris
12	GK	Giannis Liourdis	22 February 1979			(Hellenic Football Federation) Paniliakos
13	DF	Evangelois Nastos	13 September 1980			(Hellenic Football Federation) PAOK
14	DF	Giorgos Kyriazis	28 February 1980			(Hellenic Football Federation) Iraklis
15	FW	**Angelos Charisteas**	9 February 1980			(Hellenic Football Federation) Aris
16	GK	Nikolaos Anastasopoulos	5 August 1979			(Hellenic Football Federation) Skoda Xanthi
17	MF	**Pantelis Kafes**	24 June 1978			(Hellenic Football Federation) PAOK
18	FW	**Dimitris Salpingidis**	10 August 1981			(Hellenic Football Federation) PAOK
19	DF	Minas Pitsos	8 October 1980			(Hellenic Football Federation) OFI
20	MF	**Anestis Agritis**	16 April 1981			(Hellenic Football Federation) Egaleo
21	MF	Lambros Vangelis	2 February 1982			(Italian Football Federation) Siena
22	DF	**Spyros Vallas**	26 August 1981			(Hellenic Football Federation) Skoda Xanthi
