= 2002 UEFA European Under-21 Championship qualification Group 6 =

Football tournament qualification stage

The teams competing in Group 5 of the 2002 UEFA European Under-21 Championship qualifying competition were Croatia, Belgium, Scotland and Latvia.

== Standings ==
Team	Pld	W	D	L	GF	GA	GD	Pts
Belgium	6	4	1	1	8	2	+6	13
Croatia	6	3	2	1	9	6	+3	11
Scotland	6	2	2	2	6	6	0	8
Latvia	6	0	1	5	3	12	−9	1

	(Belgium)	(Croatia)	(Latvia)	(Scotland)
Belgium	—	2–1	3–0	0–0
Croatia	1–0	—	2–1	3–1
Latvia	0–2	1–1	—	1–3
Scotland	0–1	1–1	1–0	—

== Matches ==
All times are CET.

1 September 2000
17:30

Latvia	1 – 3	Scotland
Koļesņičenko 17'	Report	Hughes 25'; Burchill 56'; Easton 84'

Daugava Stadium, Liepāja
Attendance: 1200
Referee: Kristinn Jakobsson (Iceland)
1 September 2000
20:00

Belgium	2 – 1	Croatia
Soetaers 15'; Smolders 90'	Report	Bilić 36'

Stade du Pays de Charleroi, Charleroi
Referee: Svetlozar Marinov (Bulgaria)

6 October 2000
13:00

Latvia	0 – 2	Belgium
	Report	Claes 67'; Smolders 87'

Daugava Stadium, Liepāja
Attendance: 850
Referee: Karel Vidlak (Czech Republic)
10 October 2000
15:30

Croatia	3 – 1	Scotland
Mikić 39', 87'; Olić 57'	Report	Notman 35'

Gradski stadion, Koprivnica
Referee: Jack C. D. van Hulten (Netherlands)

23 March 2001
15:30

Croatia	2 – 1	Latvia
Olić 19'; Deranja 34'	Report	Karlsons 85'

Stadion HNK Cibalia, Vinkovci
Attendance: 3032
Referee: Merab Malaguradze (Georgia)
23 March 2001
20:30

Scotland	0 – 1	Belgium
	Report	Theunis 2'

East End Park, Dunfermline
Referee: Paulo Manuel Gomes Costa (Portugal)

1 June 2001
20:00

Belgium	3 – 0	Latvia
Dufer 26'; Theunis 49'; Imschoot 89'	Report

Olympisch Stadion, Antwerp
Attendance: 1250
Referee: Loizos Loizou (Cyprus)

5 June 2001
17:00

Latvia	1 – 1	Croatia
Bezzubovs 88'	Report	Mikić 53'

Daugava Stadium, Liepāja
Attendance: 600
Referee: Zoltán Szarka (Hungary)

31 August 2001
20:30

Scotland	1 – 1	Croatia
Miller 89' (pen.)	Report	Bilić 58'

McDiarmid Park, Perth
Referee: Bruno Coué (France)

4 September 2001
20:00

Belgium	0 – 0	Scotland
	Report

Stayen, Sint-Truiden
Referee: Jouni Hyytiä (Finland)

5 October 2001
17:30

Croatia	1 – 0	Belgium
Deranja 65'	Report

Stadion Kamen Ingrad, Velika
Referee: Athanassios Briakos (Greece)
5 October 2001
20:30

Scotland	1 – 0	Latvia
McNaughton 81'	Report

Broadwood Stadium, Cumbernauld
Attendance: 2455
Referee: Sergo Kvaratskhelia (Georgia)

== Goalscorers ==
3 goals

- (Croatia) Mihael Mikić

2 goals

- (Belgium) Tim Smolders
- (Belgium) Davy Theunis
- (Croatia) Mate Bilić
- (Croatia) Zvonimir Deranja
- (Croatia) Ivica Olić

1 goal

- (Belgium) Ian Claes
- (Belgium) Grégory Dufer
- (Belgium) Kristof Imschoot
- (Belgium) Tom Soetaers
- (Latvia) Romans Bezzubovs
- (Latvia) Ģirts Karlsons
- (Latvia) Vladimirs Koļesņičenko
- (Scotland) Richard Hughes
- (Scotland) Craig Easton
- (Scotland) Mark Burchill
- (Scotland) Kenny Miller
- (Scotland) Kevin McNaughton
- (Scotland) Alex Notman
