= 2002 UEFA European Under-21 Championship qualification Group 2 =

Football tournament qualification stage

The teams competing in Group 2 of the 2002 UEFA European Under-21 Championships qualifying competition were Cyprus, Estonia, Netherlands, Portugal and Republic of Ireland.

== Standings ==
Team	Pld	W	D	L	GF	GA	GD	Pts
Portugal	8	6	1	1	22	4	+18	19
Netherlands	8	5	2	1	20	7	+13	17
Republic of Ireland	8	4	1	3	10	7	+3	13
Cyprus	8	3	0	5	9	17	−8	9
Estonia	8	0	0	8	2	28	−26	0

	(Cyprus)	(Estonia)	(Netherlands)	(Portugal)	(Republic of Ireland)
Cyprus	—	3–1	0–1	1–0	0–1
Estonia	0–3	—	0–5	1–3	0–3
Netherlands	4–2	6–0	—	1–1	2–0
Portugal	7–0	4–0	3–0	—	3–1
Republic of Ireland	3–0	1–0	1–1	0–1	—

== Matches ==
All times are CET.

1 September 2000
19:00

Netherlands	2 – 0	Republic of Ireland
van der Gun 50'; Ax 86'	Report

Stadion de Goffert, Nijmegen
Referee: Kazimir Znaydinsky (Belarus)
2 September 2000
16:00

Estonia	1 – 3	Portugal
Kirilov 5'	Report	Paulo Costa 11', 49'; Cândido Costa 51'

Kadriorg Stadium, Tallinn
Referee: Edo Trivkovic (Croatia)

6 October 2000
14:00

Cyprus	0 – 1	Netherlands
	Report	Hofland 45' (pen.)

GSZ Stadium, Larnaca
Referee: Manfred Schüttengruber (Austria)
6 October 2000
22:00

Portugal	3 – 1	Republic of Ireland
Cândido Costa 62'; Ednilson 76'; António Semedo 81'	Report	Reddy 45'

Estádio Municipal, Marinha Grande
Referee: Eric Blareau (Belgium)

10 October 2000
19:00

Netherlands	1 – 1	Portugal
Kuyt 16'	Report	Ednilson 38'

Koning Willem II Stadion, Tilburg
Referee: Massimo De Santis (Italy)
10 October 2000
20:30

Republic of Ireland	1 – 0	Estonia
Quinn 58' (pen.)	Report

Buckley Park, Kilkenny
Referee: Srecko Kandare (Slovenia)

23 March 2001
14:30

Cyprus	0 – 1	Republic of Ireland
	Report	O'Brien 19'

GSZ Stadium, Larnaca
Referee: Alexandru Tudor (Romania)

27 March 2001
14:30

Cyprus	3 – 1	Estonia
Kavazis 10'; Voskaridis 17'; Christou 62'	Report	Kosemets 6'

Pafiako Stadium, Paphos
Referee: Ceri Richards (Wales)
27 March 2001
22:00

Portugal	3 – 0	Netherlands
Miguel 49'; Paulo Costa 61', 90'	Report

Estádio Dr. Machado de Matos, Felgueiras
Referee: Helmut Fleischer (Germany)

24 April 2001
19:00

Netherlands	4 – 2	Cyprus
Kuyt 8' van der Gun 35'; Knol 58' van der Meyde 73'	Report	Garpozis 45', 72'

De Vijverberg, Doetinchem
Referee: Mikko Vuorela (Finland)

1 June 2001
16:00

Estonia	0 – 5	Netherlands
	Report	Kuyt 27'; Redan 48', 56', 74'; Wisgerhof 73'

Lilleküla Stadium, Tallinn
Referee: Egill Mar Markusson (Iceland)
1 June 2001
20:30

Republic of Ireland	0 – 1	Portugal
	Report	Simão 35'

Tolka Park, Dublin
Referee: Georgios Kasnaferis (Greece)

5 June 2001
17:00

Estonia	0 – 3	Republic of Ireland
	Report	Barrett 8', 58'; Goodwin 88'

Lilleküla Stadium, Tallinn
Referee: Ghenadie Orlic (Moldova)
5 June 2001
22:00

Portugal	7 – 0	Cyprus
Simão 2', 45'; Miguel 18', 42'; Sampson 27' (o.g.); Paulo Costa 39'; Sousa 77' (pen.)	Report

Estádio Municipal de Abrantes, Abrantes
Referee: Dejan Stanisic (Serbia)

14 August 2001
18:00

Estonia	0 – 3	Cyprus
	Report	Constanti 5'; Louka 77'; Pittas 90'

Maarjamäe Stadium, Tallinn
Referee: Anton Stredak (Slovakia)

31 August 2001
20:30

Republic of Ireland	1 – 1	Netherlands
Barrett 8'	Report	van der Vaart 12'

Regional Sports Centre, Waterford
Referee: Emil Bozinovski (Macedonia)

4 September 2001
19:00

Netherlands	6 – 0	Estonia
Douglas 15'; Janssen 23'; Kuyt 29', 57'; Houwing 66'; Hersi 78'	Report

Polman Stadion, Almelo
Referee: Ihor Yarmenchuk (Ukraine)
4 September 2001
19:00

Cyprus	1 – 0	Portugal
Charalambous 90'	Report

GSZ Stadium, Larnaca
Referee: Anton Genov (Bulgaria)

5 October 2001
20:30

Republic of Ireland	3 – 0	Cyprus
Doyle 54', 60'; Reid 68'	Report

Flancare Park, Longford
Referee: Slavik Kazaryan (Armenia)
5 October 2001
22:30

Portugal	4 – 0	Estonia
Hugo Leal 8', 45'; Postiga 37'; Miguel 65'	Report

Estádio José Gomes, Amadora
Referee: Bujar Pregja (Albania)
