= 2002 UEFA European Under-21 Championship qualification Group 1 =

Football tournament qualification stage

The teams competing in Group 1 of the 2002 UEFA European Under-21 Championships qualifying competition were Russia, Yugoslavia, Switzerland, Slovenia and Luxembourg.

== Standings ==
Team	Pld	W	D	L	GF	GA	GD	Pts
Switzerland	8	4	4	0	22	10	+12	16
Russia	8	4	3	1	23	9	+14	15
FR Yugoslavia	8	4	3	1	22	11	+11	15
Slovenia	8	2	2	4	10	10	0	8
Luxembourg	8	0	0	8	1	38	−37	0

	(Luxembourg)	(Russia)	(Slovenia)	(Switzerland)	(Federal Republic of Yugoslavia)
Luxembourg	—	0–10	1–5	0–3	0–3
Russia	2–0	—	0–0	3–3	2–0
Slovenia	1–0	1–3	—	0–0	1–2
Switzerland	6–0	3–1	2–1	—	2–2
FR Yugoslavia	8–0	2–2	2–1	3–3	—

== Matches ==
All times are CET.

1 September 2000
19:30

Switzerland	3 – 1	Russia
Frei 59'; Cabanas 79'; Muff 83'	Report	Ramazanov 27'

Stadion Allmend, Lucerne
Attendance: 1,631
Referee: Jaroslav Jara (Czech Republic)
3 September 2000
14:00

Luxembourg	0 – 3	FR Yugoslavia
	Report	Brnović 17'; Duljaj 24'; Bošković 44'

Holleschbierg, Hesperange
Attendance: 550
Referee: Bülent Uzun (Turkey)

6 October 2000
19:15

Luxembourg	1 – 5	Slovenia
Chaboissier 63'	Report	Radosavljević 22', 70'; Pekič 26', 43'; Barut 53'

Koericherberg, Hobscheid
Attendance: 300
Referee: Algirdas Dubinskas (Lithuania)

10 October 2000
16:00

Slovenia	0 – 0	Switzerland
	Report

Sports Park, Nova Gorica
Attendance: 600
Referee: Juha Hirviniemi (Finland)
11 October 2000
13:00

Russia	2 – 0	Luxembourg
Gogniev 48'; Bystrov 59'	Report

Eduard Streltsov Stadium, Moscow
Attendance: 980
Referee: Paul Mckeon (Republic of Ireland)

23 March 2001
17:00

FR Yugoslavia	3 – 3	Switzerland
Brnović 33'; Delibašić 64', 74'	Report	Meyer 23'; Greco 56', 69' (pen.)

Stadium of Vojvodina, Novi Sad
Attendance: 6,320
Referee: Ferenc Bede (Hungary)
24 March 2001
13:00

Russia	0 – 0	Slovenia
	Report

Eduard Streltsov Stadium, Moscow
Attendance: 3,500
Referee: Georgios Douros (Greece)

27 March 2001
16:00

Slovenia	1 – 2	FR Yugoslavia
Koren 86'	Report	Brnović 21', 82'

Sports Centre, Dravograd
Attendance: 1,200
Referee: Bernhard Brugger (Austria)
27 March 2001
18:30

Switzerland	6 – 0	Luxembourg
Cabanas 14', 45' (pen.), 89'; Greco 18'; Gygax 24'; Zanni 35'	Report

Sportplatz Brühl, Muri
Attendance: 1,050
Referee: Sokol Jareci (Albania)

25 April 2001
14:00

FR Yugoslavia	2 – 2	Russia
Marković 19'; Dudić 83'	Report	Gogniev 50', 76'

FK Obilić Stadium, Belgrade
Attendance: 1,000
Referee: Nicolai Vollquartz (Denmark)

1 June 2001
17:00

Slovenia	1 – 0	Luxembourg
Šukalo 72'	Report

ŽŠD Stadium, Ljubljana
Attendance: 1,000
Referee: Gevorg Hovhannisyan (Armenia)
2 June 2001
13:00

Russia	2 – 0	FR Yugoslavia
Kusov 10'; Bystrov 90+3'	Report

Eduard Streltsov Stadium, Moscow
Attendance: 7,200
Referee: Éric Blareau (Belgium)

5 June 2001
20:00

Switzerland	2 – 1	Slovenia
Gygax 28', 73'	Report	Pekič 83' (pen.)

Stadion FC Solothurn, Solothurn
Attendance: 1,450
Referee: Knud Stadsgaard (Denmark)
6 June 2001
15:30

Luxembourg	0 – 10	Russia
	Report	Bystrov 6', 15', 89'; Gogniev 17', 41'; Pimenov 27', 35', 64'; Kuzmin 44'; Izmailov 75'

Stade Municipal, Pétange
Attendance: 53
Referee: José Luis Mengual Prades (Andorra)

31 August 2001
19:30

Switzerland	2 – 2	FR Yugoslavia
Melunović 34'; Cabanas 36' (pen.)	Report	Marković 57'; Iliev 70'

Stadion Allmend, Lucerne
Attendance: 2,000
Referee: David Malcolm (Northern Ireland)
1 September 2001
12:00

Slovenia	1 – 3	Russia
Žnuderl 16'	Report	Gogniev 2', 43'; Kerzhakov 83'

City Stadium, Zagorje ob Savi
Attendance: 1,100
Referee: John Underhill (Scotland)

4 September 2001
19:00

Luxembourg	0 – 3	Switzerland
	Report	Eggimann 29'; Berisha 61'; Greco 67'

Stade de la Frontière, Esch-sur-Alzette
Attendance: 300
Referee: Emanuel Raphael Zammit (Malta)
4 September 2001
19:00

FR Yugoslavia	2 – 1	Slovenia
Delibašić 46'; Jolović 60'	Report	Brulc 58'

Stadium of Vojvodina, Novi Sad
Attendance: 3,500
Referee: Lubomír Puček (Czech Republic)

5 October 2001
16:00

FR Yugoslavia	8 – 0	Luxembourg
Dudić 3', 4', 28'; Bogavac 35', 50', 89'; Marković 78'; Bošković 87' (pen.)	Report

Omladinski Stadium, Belgrade
Attendance: 200
Referee: Bragi Bergmann (Iceland)
5 October 2001
16:00

Russia	3 – 3	Switzerland
Berezutski 6'; Bezrodny 11'; Pimenov 16'	Report	Magnin 2'; Cabanas 60', 81'

Saturn Stadium, Ramenskoye
Attendance: 11,500
Referee: Luc Huyghe (Belgium)

== Goalscorers ==
7 goals

- (Russia) Spartak Gogniev
- (Switzerland) Ricardo Cabanas

5 goals

- (Russia) Pyotr Bystrov

4 goals

- (Russia) Ruslan Pimenov
- (Switzerland) Daniel Greco
- (Federal Republic of Yugoslavia) Bojan Brnović
- (Federal Republic of Yugoslavia) Milan Dudić

3 goals

- (Slovenia) Damir Pekič
- (Switzerland) Daniel Gygax
- (Federal Republic of Yugoslavia) Dragan Bogavac
- (Federal Republic of Yugoslavia) Andrija Delibašić
- (Federal Republic of Yugoslavia) Marjan Marković

2 goals

- (Slovenia) Aleksandar Radosavljević
- (Federal Republic of Yugoslavia) Branko Bošković

1 goal

- (Luxembourg) David Chaboissier
- (Russia) Vasili Berezutski
- (Russia) Artem Bezrodny
- (Russia) Marat Izmailov
- (Russia) Aleksandr Kerzhakov
- (Russia) Alan Kusov
- (Russia) Oleg Kuzmin
- (Russia) Murad Ramazanov
- (Slovenia) Uroš Barut
- (Slovenia) Mitja Brulc
- (Slovenia) Robert Koren
- (Slovenia) Goran Šukalo
- (Slovenia) Boštjan Žnuderl
- (Switzerland) Johann Berisha
- (Switzerland) Mario Eggimann
- (Switzerland) Alexander Frei
- (Switzerland) Ludovic Magnin
- (Switzerland) Elvir Melunović
- (Switzerland) Remo Meyer
- (Switzerland) André Muff
- (Switzerland) Reto Zanni
- (Federal Republic of Yugoslavia) Ivica Iliev
- (Federal Republic of Yugoslavia) Nikola Jolović
