= 2002 UEFA European Under-21 Championship qualification =

Football tournament qualification stage

The 2002 UEFA European Under-21 Championship qualification began in 2000. The final tournament was held in 2002. The 47 national teams were divided into nine groups (one group of four, five groups of 5, and three groups of 6). The records of the nine group runners-up were then compared. The top seven joined the nine winners in a play-off for the eight finals spots. One of the eight qualifiers was then chosen to host the remaining fixtures.

== Qualifying group stage ==
=== Draw ===
The allocation of teams into qualifying groups was based on that of 2002 FIFA World Cup qualification with several changes, reflecting the absence of some nations:

- Groups 3, 4, 5, 8 and 9 featured the same nations
- Group 1 did not include Faroe Islands
- Group 2 did not include Andorra
- Group 6 did not include San Marino
- Group 7 did not include Liechtenstein, but included France (who did not participate in World Cup qualification)

=== Group 1 ===
Team	Pld	W	D	L	GF	GA	GD	Pts
Switzerland	8	4	4	0	22	10	+12	16
Russia	8	4	3	1	23	9	+14	15
FR Yugoslavia	8	4	3	1	22	11	+11	15
Slovenia	8	2	2	4	10	10	0	8
Luxembourg	8	0	0	8	1	38	−37	0

	(Luxembourg)	(Russia)	(Slovenia)	(Switzerland)	(Federal Republic of Yugoslavia)
Luxembourg	—	0–10	1–5	0–3	0–3
Russia	2–0	—	0–0	3–3	2–0
Slovenia	1–0	1–3	—	0–0	1–2
Switzerland	6–0	3–1	2–1	—	2–2
FR Yugoslavia	8–0	2–2	2–1	3–3	—

Switzerland qualify as group winners
Russia fail to qualify as one of best runners-up

=== Group 2 ===
Team	Pld	W	D	L	GF	GA	GD	Pts
Portugal	8	6	1	1	22	4	+18	19
Netherlands	8	5	2	1	20	7	+13	17
Republic of Ireland	8	4	1	3	10	7	+3	13
Cyprus	8	3	0	5	9	17	−8	9
Estonia	8	0	0	8	2	28	−26	0

	(Cyprus)	(Estonia)	(Netherlands)	(Portugal)	(Republic of Ireland)
Cyprus	—	3–1	0–1	1–0	0–1
Estonia	0–3	—	0–5	1–3	0–3
Netherlands	4–2	6–0	—	1–1	2–0
Portugal	7–0	4–0	3–0	—	3–1
Republic of Ireland	3–0	1–0	1–1	0–1	—

Portugal qualify as group winners
Netherlands qualify as one of best runners-up

=== Group 3 ===
Team	Pld	W	D	L	GF	GA	GD	Pts
Czech Republic	10	9	0	1	28	5	+23	27
Bulgaria	10	5	3	2	16	17	−1	18
Denmark	10	4	3	3	18	12	+6	15
Iceland	10	3	2	5	13	17	−4	11
Northern Ireland	10	2	2	6	12	21	−9	8
Malta	10	0	4	6	5	20	−15	4

- Bulgaria 1–0 Czech Rep.
- Iceland 0–0 Denmark
- N. Ireland 1–1* Malta
- Bulgaria 2–0 Malta
- Czech Rep. 2–1 Iceland
- N. Ireland 0–3 Denmark
- Denmark 2–2 Bulgaria
- Malta 0–1 Czech Rep.
- Iceland 2–5 N. Ireland
- Malta 0–0 Denmark
- N. Ireland 0–2 Czech Rep.
- Bulgaria 1–0 Iceland
- Bulgaria 2–0 N. Ireland
- Czech Rep. 3–0 Denmark
- Malta 1–1 Iceland
- Denmark 3–4 Czech Rep.
- Iceland 3–0 Malta
- N. Ireland 1–1 Bulgaria
- Denmark 3–0 Malta
- Iceland 3–2 Bulgaria
- Czech Rep. 4–0 N. Ireland
- Denmark 2–0 N. Ireland
- Iceland 0–1 Czech Rep.
- Malta 2–2 Bulgaria
- Bulgaria 3–1 Denmark
- Czech Rep. 3–0 Malta
- N. Ireland 1–3 Iceland
- Denmark 4–0 Iceland
- Malta 2–2 N. Ireland
- Czech Rep. 8–0 Bulgaria

(*) Match awarded 3–0 to N.Ireland
due to Malta fielding an ineligible player.
Czech Republic qualify as group winners
Bulgaria fail to qualify as one of best runners-up

=== Group 4 ===
Team	Pld	W	D	L	GF	GA	GD	Pts
Turkey	10	7	2	1	19	6	+13	23
Sweden	10	5	4	1	19	6	+13	19
Slovakia	10	4	4	2	13	7	+6	16
Moldova	10	2	3	5	6	13	−7	9
Azerbaijan	10	2	3	5	4	17	−13	9
Macedonia	10	1	2	7	6	18	−12	5

- Azerbaijan 0–5 Sweden
- Turkey 1–0 Moldova
- Slovakia 2–0 R. Macedonia
- Moldova 0–3 Slovakia
- R. Macedonia 1–2 Azerbaijan
- Sweden 0–0 Turkey
- Moldova 3–0 R. Macedonia
- Azerbaijan 1–2 Turkey
- Slovakia 1–1 Sweden
- Turkey 0–1 Slovakia
- Sweden 2–0 R. Macedonia
- Azerbaijan 0–0 Moldova
- R. Macedonia 1–4 Turkey
- Slovakia 5–0 Azerbaijan
- Moldova 0–2 Sweden
- Turkey 3–0 Azerbaijan
- Sweden 4–0 Slovakia
- R. Macedonia 2–0 Moldova
- Turkey 2–0 R. Macedonia
- Azerbaijan 0–0 Slovakia
- Sweden 3–0 Moldova
- Slovakia 0–1 Turkey
- Moldova 1–0 Azerbaijan
- R. Macedonia 1–1 Sweden
- Turkey 4–1 Sweden
- Azerbaijan 1–0 R. Macedonia
- Slovakia 0–0 Moldova
- Moldova 2–2 Turkey
- Sweden 0–0 Azerbaijan
- R. Macedonia 1–1 Slovakia

Turkey qualify as group winners
Sweden qualify as one of best runners-up

=== Group 5 ===
Team	Pld	W	D	L	GF	GA	GD	Pts
Ukraine	10	6	1	3	14	13	+1	19
Poland	10	5	3	2	20	14	+6	18
Norway	10	6	0	4	21	12	+9	18
Belarus	10	5	1	4	21	14	+7	16
Armenia	10	4	2	4	10	15	−5	14
Wales	10	0	1	9	4	22	−18	1

	(Armenia)	(Belarus)	(Norway)	(Poland)	(Ukraine)	(Wales)
Armenia	—	1–0	2–0	2–0	1–2	1–0
Belarus	5–0	—	1–0	3–3	1–2	4–1
Norway	5–1	5–1	—	1–2	3–1	2–0
Poland	1–1	0–4	3–0	—	3–0	2–1
Ukraine	1–0	1–0	1–3	2–2	—	1–0
Wales	1–1	1–2	0–2	0–4	0–3	—

Ukraine qualify as group winners
Poland qualify as one of best runners-up

=== Group 6 ===
Team	Pld	W	D	L	GF	GA	GD	Pts
Belgium	6	4	1	1	8	2	+6	13
Croatia	6	3	2	1	9	6	+3	11
Scotland	6	2	2	2	6	6	0	8
Latvia	6	0	1	5	3	12	−9	1

	(Belgium)	(Croatia)	(Latvia)	(Scotland)
Belgium	—	2–1	3–0	0–0
Croatia	1–0	—	2–1	3–1
Latvia	0–2	1–1	—	1–3
Scotland	0–1	1–1	1–0	—

Belgium qualify as group winners
Croatia qualify as one of best runners-up

=== Group 7 ===
Team	Pld	W	D	L	GF	GA	GD	Pts
France	8	6	2	0	16	6	+10	20
Spain	8	5	1	2	13	7	+6	16
Israel	8	4	0	4	16	13	+3	12
Austria	8	2	2	4	7	14	−7	8
Bosnia and Herzegovina	8	0	1	7	5	17	−12	1

- Bosnia & Herz. 0–2 Spain
- France 3–0 Israel
- France 2–1 Austria
- Spain 1–0 Israel
- Austria 2–1 Spain
- Israel 2–1 Bosnia & Herz.
- Bosnia & Herz. 0–1 France
- Israel 3–4 France
- Bosnia & Herz. 0–0 Austria
- Spain 1–1 France
- Austria 0–2 Israel
- Austria 1–1 France
- Spain 5–1 Bosnia & Herz.
- Israel 0–1 Spain
- Spain 2–0 Austria
- Bosnia & Herz. 2–4 Israel
- Austria 2–1 Bosnia & Herz.
- France 3–0 Spain
- France 1–0 Bosnia & Herz.
- Israel 5–1 Austria

France qualify as group winners
Spain qualify as one of best runners-up

=== Group 8 ===
Team	Pld	W	D	L	GF	GA	GD	Pts
Italy	8	6	1	1	14	5	+9	19
Romania	8	5	1	2	13	5	+8	16
Hungary	8	5	0	3	12	9	+3	15
Lithuania	8	2	0	6	5	17	−12	6
Georgia	8	1	0	7	9	17	−8	3

- Romania 2–0* Lithuania
- Hungary 0–3 Italy
- Lithuania 2–1 Georgia
- Italy 1–1 Romania
- Lithuania 0–1 Hungary
- Italy 3–2 Georgia
- Hungary 4–1 Lithuania
- Romania 0–1 Italy
- Georgia 0–3 Romania
- Italy 1–0 Lithuania
- Romania 1–0 Hungary
- Georgia 0–2 Italy
- Lithuania 1–0 Romania
- Hungary 2–1 Georgia
- Georgia 0–2 Hungary
- Lithuania 0–3 Italy
- Hungary 1–3 Romania
- Georgia 4–1 Lithuania
- Italy 0–2 Hungary
- Romania 2–1 Georgia

(*) Match awarded 3–0 to Romania
due to Lithuania fielding an ineligible player.
Italy qualify as group winners
Romania qualify as one of best runners-up

=== Group 9 ===
Team	Pld	W	D	L	GF	GA	GD	Pts
England	8	5	2	1	18	8	+10	17
Greece	8	5	1	2	14	6	+8	16
Germany	8	5	1	2	18	7	+11	16
Finland	8	1	1	6	7	20	−13	4
Albania	8	1	1	6	3	19	−16	4

- Finland 3–0 Albania
- Germany 2–1 Greece
- England 1–1 Germany
- Greece 3–1 Finland
- Finland 2–2 England
- Albania 0–1 Greece
- Germany 8–0 Albania
- England 4–0 Finland
- Albania 0–1 England
- Greece 2–0 Germany
- Finland 1–3 Germany
- Greece 0–0 Albania
- Greece 3–1 England
- Albania 0–1 Germany
- Germany 1–2 England
- Albania 3–0 Finland
  Memelli 28' Kaçi 65' Bulku 83'
- England 5–0 Albania
- Finland 0–3 Greece
- England 2–1 Greece
- Germany 2–0 Finland

England qualify as group winners
Greece qualify as one of best runners-up
Greece (16pts) Germany (16pts) head-to-head:
2–1 in GER, 2–0 in GRE
.: Greece better (3–2 on aggregate)

=== Ranking of second-placed teams ===
Because groups contained different number or teams (six, five and four), matches against the fifth- and sixth-placed teams in each group are not included in the ranking. As a result, six matches played by each team counted for the purposes of the second-placed table. The top seven advanced to the play-off.

Grp	Team	Pld	W	D	L	GF	GA	GD	Pts
9	Greece	6	4	0	2	14	6	+8	12
4	Sweden	6	3	2	1	11	5	+6	11
5	Poland	6	3	2	1	13	10	+3	11
6	Croatia	6	3	2	1	9	6	+3	11
2	Netherlands	6	3	2	1	9	7	+2	11
8	Romania	6	3	1	2	8	4	+4	10
7	Spain	6	3	1	2	6	6	0	10
3	Bulgaria	6	3	1	2	9	14	−5	10
1	Russia	6	2	3	1	11	9	+2	9

== Play-offs ==
Team 1	Agg.	Team 2	1st leg	2nd leg
Sweden	3–4	Belgium	3–2	0–2
Greece	4–2	Turkey	3–0	1–2
Netherlands	2–3	England	2–2	0–1
Spain	2–2 (a)	Portugal	2–1	0–1
Croatia	1–1 (a)	Czech Republic	1–1	0–0
Poland	2–5	Italy	2–5	0–0
Romania	0–5	France	0–1	0–4
Ukraine	2–4	Switzerland	1–2	1–2
