= 2002 UEFA European Under-21 Championship qualification Group 5 =

Football tournament qualification stage

The teams competing in Group 5 of the 2002 UEFA European Under-21 Championship qualifying competition were Norway, Ukraine, Poland, Wales, Belarus and Armenia.

== Standings ==
Team	Pld	W	D	L	GF	GA	GD	Pts
Ukraine	10	6	1	3	14	13	+1	19
Poland	10	5	3	2	20	14	+6	18
Norway	10	6	0	4	21	12	+9	18
Belarus	10	5	1	4	21	14	+7	16
Armenia	10	4	2	4	10	15	−5	14
Wales	10	0	1	9	4	22	−18	1

	(Armenia)	(Belarus)	(Norway)	(Poland)	(Ukraine)	(Wales)
Armenia	—	1–0	2–0	2–0	1–2	1–0
Belarus	5–0	—	1–0	3–3	1–2	4–1
Norway	5–1	5–1	—	1–2	3–1	2–0
Poland	1–1	0–4	3–0	—	3–0	2–1
Ukraine	1–0	1–0	1–3	2–2	—	1–0
Wales	1–1	1–2	0–2	0–4	0–3	—

== Matches ==
All times are CET.

1 September 2000
16:00

Belarus	4 – 1	Wales
Kutuzov 24' (pen.); Lyadzyanyow 44'; Bulyga 57'	Report	Earnshaw 85'

City Stadium, Borisov
Attendance: 2,500
Referee: Georgios Psychomanis (Greece)
1 September 2000
18:00

Norway	5 – 1	Armenia
Carew 24', 48'; Karadas 34'; George 34'; Ludvigsen 84'	Report	S.Erzrumyan 68'

Nadderud Stadion, Bærum
Referee: Mika Peltola (Finland)
1 September 2000
18:00

Ukraine	2 – 2	Poland
Byelik 51'; Ditkovskyi 90'	Report	Rasiak 62'; Ciesielski 75'

Dynamo Stadium, Kyiv
Referee: Jozef Kacenga (Slovakia)

6 October 2000
11:00

Armenia	1 – 2	Ukraine
Ara Hakobyan 68'	Report	Tkachenko 16'; Lysytskyi 88'

City Stadium, Gyumri
Referee: Henri Diederich (Luxembourg)
6 October 2000
15:15

Poland	0 – 4	Belarus
	Report	Lyadzyanyow 8'; Amelyanchuk 16'; Kutuzov 51' (pen.); Karytska 70'

Ceramika Stadium, Opoczno
Attendance: 2,500
Referee: Dick van Egmond (Netherlands)
6 October 2000
20:30

Wales	0 – 2	Norway
	Report	Ludvigsen 9', 63'

Vetch Field, Swansea
Referee: Darius Mieželis (Lithuania)

10 October 2000
14:00

Belarus	5 – 0	Armenia
Lashankow 6'; Lyadzyanyow 20', 29'; Kutuzov 23'; Bulyga 65'	Report

City Stadium, Borisov
Attendance: 1,300
Referee: Lubomír Puček (Czech Republic)
10 October 2000
15:15

Poland	2 – 1	Wales
Głowacki 65'; Rasiak 90'	Report	J.Thomas 15'

Ceramika Stadium, Opoczno
Referee: Milan Mitrović (Slovenia)
10 October 2000
18:00

Norway	3 – 1	Ukraine
Råstad 26'; Karadas 51'; Hoff 90'	Report	Byelik 22'

Marienlyst Stadion, Drammen
Referee: Ante Kulušić (Croatia)

23 March 2001
11:00

Armenia	1 – 0	Wales
Aram Hakobyan 82'	Report

Kotayk Stadium, Abovyan
Referee: Alojzije Šupraha (Croatia)
23 March 2001
17:00

Ukraine	1 – 0	Belarus
Monaryov 29'	Report

Dynamo Stadium, Kyiv
Attendance: 8,000
Referee: Peter Fröjdfeldt (Sweden)
24 March 2001
13:00

Norway	1 – 2	Poland
Valencia 30'	Report	Smolarek 69'; Rasiak 75'

Viking Stadion, Stavanger
Referee: Massimo Busacca (Switzerland)

27 March 2001
15:00

Belarus	1 – 0	Norway
Kutuzov 75'	Report

City Stadium, Borisov
Attendance: 7,000
Referee: Steve Bennett (England)
27 March 2001
16:00

Poland	1 – 1	Armenia
Smolarek 42'	Report	Ara Hakobyan 50'

Stadion MOSiR, Ostrołęka
Referee: Darius Mieželis (Lithuania)
27 March 2001
20:30

Wales	0 – 3	Ukraine
	Report	Monaryov 11', 20'; Zapoyaska 16'

Vetch Field, Swansea
Referee: Imankhan Sultani (Azerbaijan)

1 June 2001
11:00

Armenia	1 – 0	Belarus
S.Erzrumyan 55'	Report

Kotayk Stadium, Abovyan
Attendance: 2,000
Referee: Ruud Bossen (Netherlands)
1 June 2001
17:00

Ukraine	1 – 3	Norway
Oleksienko 13'	Report	Søgård 6'; George 33', 51'

Dynamo Stadium, Kyiv
Referee: Alan Freeland (Scotland)
1 June 2001
20:30

Wales	0 – 4	Poland
	Report	Smolarek 16', 52'; Gorawski 34', 56'

Penydarren Park, Merthyr Tydfil
Referee: Sergo Kvaratskhelia (Georgia)

5 June 2001
11:00

Armenia	2 – 0	Poland
Aleksanyan 56'; H.Hakobyan 67'	Report

Kotayk Stadium, Abovyan
Referee: Zsolt Szabó (Hungary)
5 June 2001
17:00

Ukraine	1 – 0	Wales
Malokutsko 56'	Report

Dynamo Stadium, Kyiv
Referee: Jaromír Hlaváč (Czech Republic)
5 June 2001
19:00

Norway	5 – 1	Belarus
Kah 11'; Hoff 36'; Valencia 51'; George 76' (pen.); Riise 90'	Report	Hleb 66'

Marienlyst Stadion, Drammen
Attendance: 1,235
Referee: Roland Beck (Liechtenstein)

31 August 2001
16:30

Poland	3 – 0	Norway
Rasiak 13', 22', 85'	Report

Stadion MOSiR, Czechowice-Dziedzice
Referee: Alexandru Tudor (Romania)
31 August 2001
17:00

Belarus	1 – 2	Ukraine
Yurevich 45'	Report	Valeyev 8'; Tkachenko 65'

City Stadium, Borisov
Attendance: 4,000
Referee: Darko Čeferin (Slovenia)
31 August 2001
20:30

Wales	1 – 1	Armenia
Day 42' (pen.)	Report	S.Erzrumyan 69'

Penydarren Park, Merthyr Tydfil
Referee: Vladimir Antonov (Moldova)

4 September 2001
16:00

Belarus	3 – 3	Poland
Kutuzov 3', 21'; Strakhanovich 37'	Report	Gorawski 55'; Kowalczyk 64'; Olszar 90'

City Stadium, Borisov
Attendance: 2,500
Referee: Goran Marić (Croatia)
4 September 2001
16:30

Ukraine	1 – 0	Armenia
Byelik 39'	Report

Shakhtar Stadium, Chervonohrad
Referee: Meir Levi (Israel)
4 September 2001
19:00

Norway	2 – 0	Wales
Ludvigsen 5'; George 45'	Report

Marienlyst Stadion, Drammen
Referee: Dejan Delević (FR Yugoslavia)

5 October 2001
13:30

Armenia	2 – 0	Norway
Ara Hakobyan 66', 88'	Report

Kotayk Stadium, Abovyan
Referee: Andy D'Urso (England)
5 October 2001
13:30

Poland	3 – 0	Ukraine
Smolarek 60'; M.Lewandowski 64' (pen.); Olszar 76'	Report

Stadion Skałka im. Pawła Waloszka, Świętochłowice
Referee: Costas Kapitanis (Cyprus)
5 October 2001
20:30

Wales	1 – 2	Belarus
Williams 90'	Report	Sokol 13'; Kutuzov 33'

Ninian Park, Cardiff
Attendance: 1,274
Referee: Lassin Isaksen (Faroe Islands)

== Goalscorers ==
- TBD
