= Ian Claes =

Belgian footballer

Personal information
- Full name: Ian Claes
- Date of birth: 16 July 1981 (age 45)
- Place of birth: Sint-Truiden, Belgium
- Position: Forward

Youth career
- Sint-Truiden

Senior career*
Years	Team	Apps	(Gls)
1999–2000	Sint-Truiden	0	(0)
2000–2001	Heerenveen	2	(0)
2001–2003	Mechelen	3	(0)
2002–2003	→ OH Leuven (loan)	19	(5)
2003–2004	Tongeren	15	(2)

International career^{‡}
1999	Belgium U18	2	(0)
2000–2001	Belgium U21	4	(1)
- * Club domestic league appearances and goals as of 18 August 2012 ‡ National team caps and goals as of 18 August 2012

Ian Claes (born 16 July 1981 in Sint-Truiden) is a retired Belgian professional footballer. During his career, he played as a forward for Sint-Truiden, Heerenveen, KV Mechelen, Oud-Heverlee Leuven and Tongeren.

As a promising youngster with Sint-Truiden, Claes was selected for two 2000 UEFA European Under-18 Football Championship qualifying matches in 1999 and signed by Dutch team Heerenveen led by Foppe de Haan. As De Haan was impressed, Claes was immediately brought into the first team, playing the first two matches of the 2000-01 season. For unclear reasons, he never played any matches for Heerenveen thereafter, moving back to Belgium the next season at Mechelen. Although Claes gained 4 caps for the Belgium U21 during the 2002 UEFA European Under-21 Football Championship qualification, scoring one goal against Latvia, he only featured in three matches and during the 2002–03 season, Mechelen loaned him out to Belgian Third Division team OH Leuven. As a result of Mechelen being refused a Belgian professional football license after going into liquidation later that season, the contract of Claes was annulled, causing him to be a free player after his loan spell at OH Leuven. He played one more season at Tongeren, before quitting professional football.
