= Waterford Regional Sports Centre =

Sports venue in Waterford, Ireland

Regional Sports Centre
- The RSC
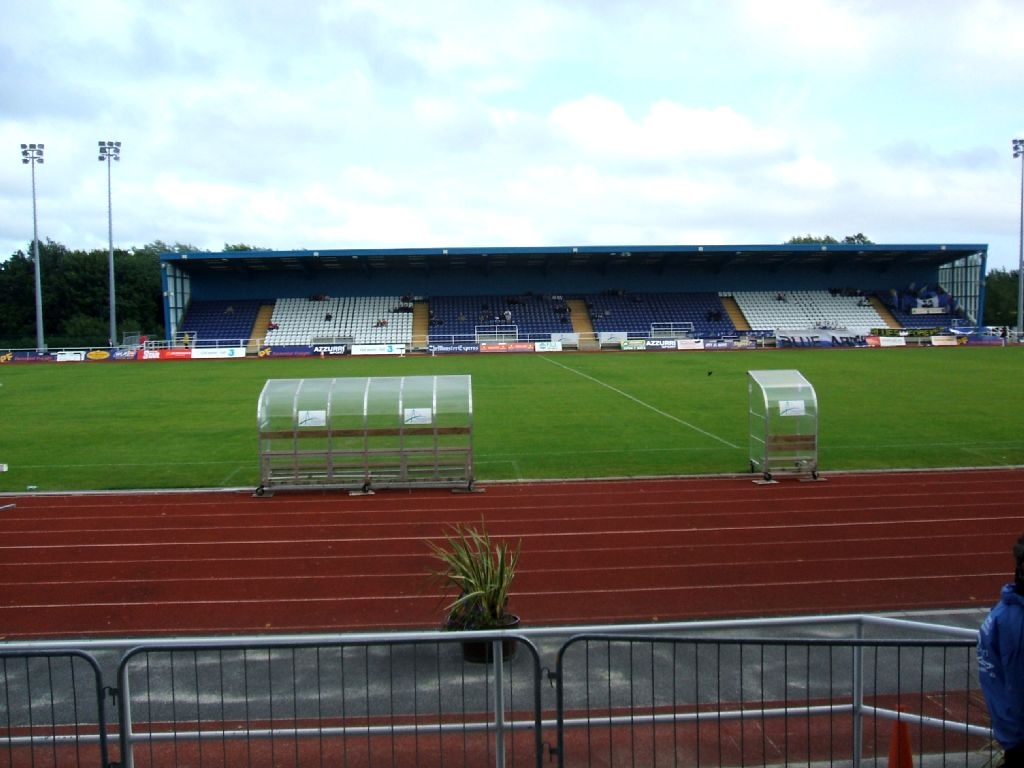
- East Stand in 2009, as seen from the West Stand
- Interactive map of Regional Sports Centre
- Full name: Waterford Regional Sports Centre
- Location: Cork Road, Waterford, Ireland
- Coordinates: 52.24618466°N 7.124692°W
- Owner: Waterford City and County Council
- Capacity: 5,154 (3,035 seats)
- Field size: 105 by 75 yards (96 by 69 m)
- Public transit: Waterford railway station

Construction
- Built: 1992–1993
- Opened: 1993
- Renovated: 2008

Tenants
- Waterford F.C. 1993–present Waterford FC (women)

The Waterford Regional Sports Centre (or simply, the RSC) is a multi-purpose stadium in Waterford, part of the local authority's municipal sporting facilities and home to Waterford F.C. of the League of Ireland. The stadium is also the home ground of the club's women's team. Waterford moved to the newly opened RSC from their former home, Kilcohan Park for the 1993–94 season and have remained there ever since.

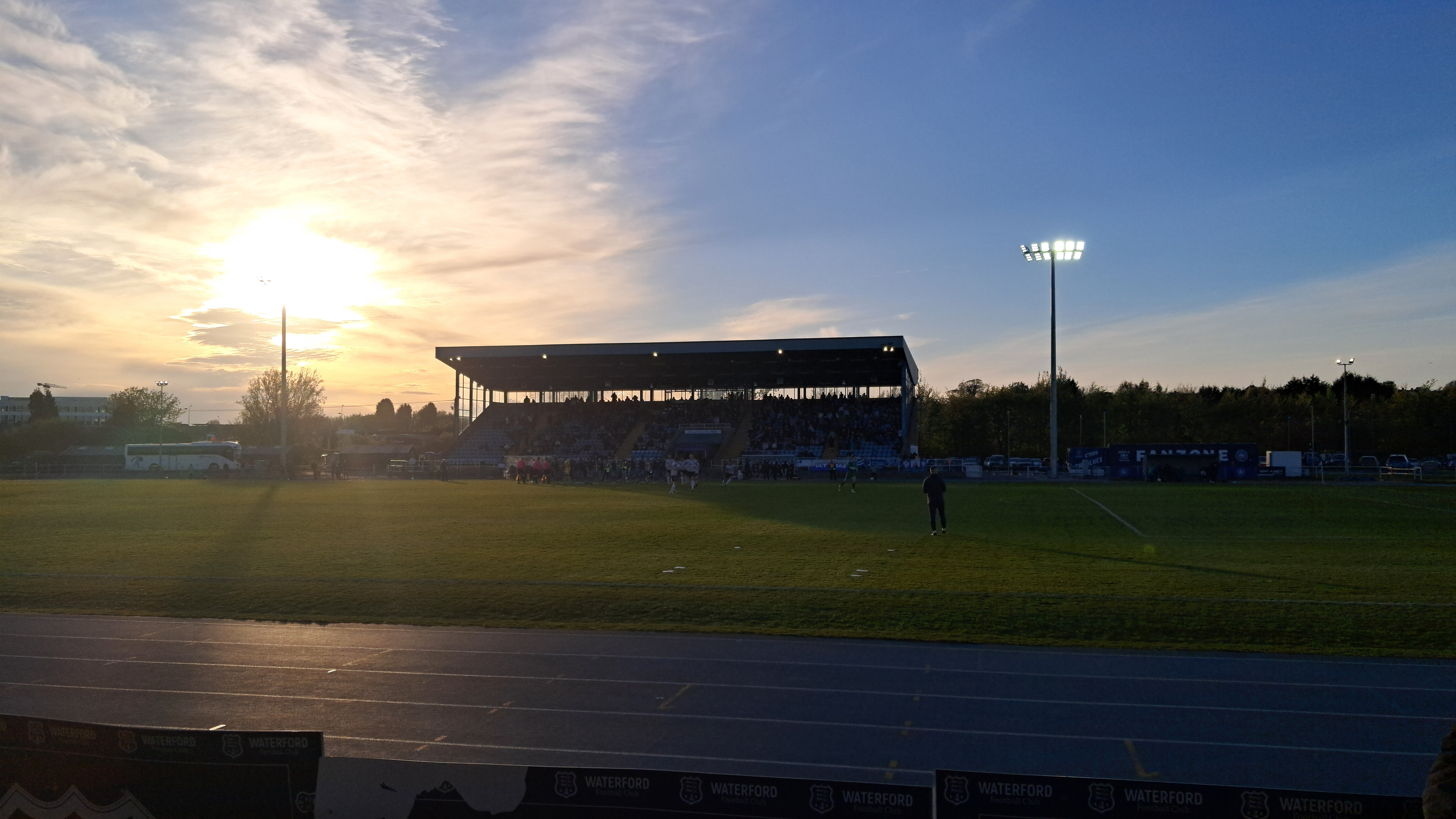
West Stand of the RSC before a game between Waterford and Galway United in 2026.

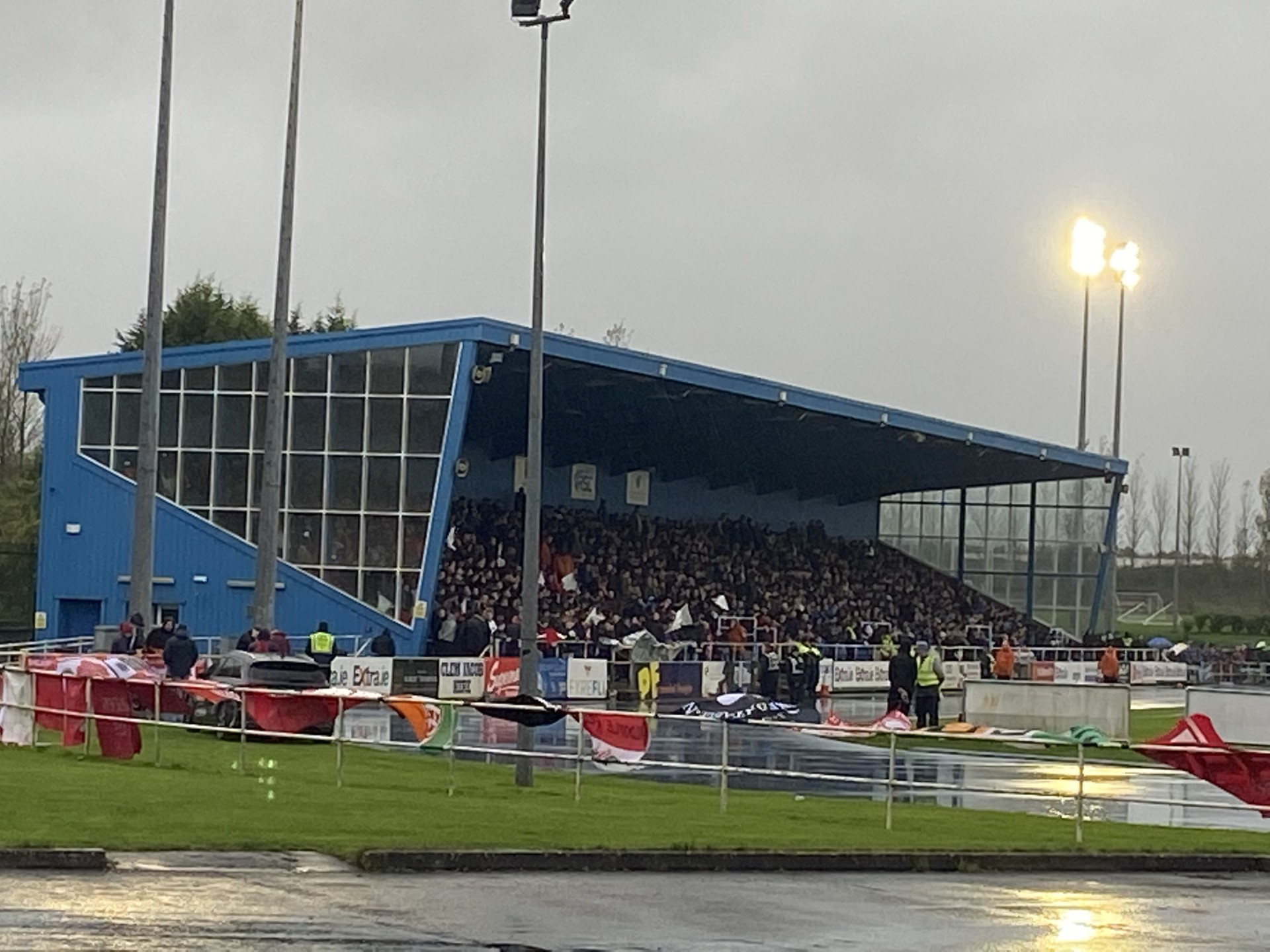
East Stand before Waterford's FAI Cup semi-final against Shelbourne on 16 October 2022

Included on the 40 acre site is an 18-hole pitch and putt course, a gym, an indoor hall, four football pitches and tennis courts. The complex also had a Skateboard Park. The RSC comprises two stands. The Cork Road West Stand, opened in May 1996 has capacity of 1,275 seats. The Kilbarry side East Stand, aka the New Stand, opened in May 2008, holds 1,760 and brings seating capacity to 3,035. Away supporters are housed in Blocks A and B of the New Stand. There are future plans to extend the West Stand to bring the overall seated capacity to near 5,000.

The RSC also has a synthetic 400m Mondo running track surrounding the soccer pitch, built to IAAF international standards.

The RSC also hosted UEFA U21 European Championship Qualifiers when the Republic of Ireland played Holland and Russia and for the 2011 UEFA European Under-21 Championship qualifier against Switzerland. These games were televised live by Sky.

== History ==
Waterford F.C. began playing their home games at the Regional Sports Centre (RSC) in 1993. The club was joined at the sports centre by Ferrybank Athletic Club in 1999.

The ground was the venue for a Republic of Ireland under-21 game in August 2001, when it hosted a 2002 UEFA European Championship qualifier against the Netherlands. In June 2009, the Republic of Ireland under-21 team defeated a Spain under-21 side in a friendly at the RSC, winning 2–1 in front of a 3,400 capacity crowd. In September 2009, the stadium hosted 4,000 fans for the League of Ireland Cup final as Bohemians beat Waterford United 3–1.

The Republic of Ireland under-23 team played England C at the stadium in May 2010 for a 2009–11 International Challenge Trophy game. The stadium also hosted the Republic of Ireland under-21 team for their 2011 UEFA European Under-21 Championship qualifier against Switzerland. The ground was later chosen as a venue for the 2019 UEFA European Under-17 Championship and hosted four group games.

In February 2023, new floodlights were installed at the venue. In December 2023, Waterford F.C. announced that they had secured a 50 year lease from Waterford City and County Council for the RSC. In 2025, Waterford F.C. opened a new club shop in the main stand. In April 2026, the council applied for planning permission to replace two of the site's grass pitches with floodlit, artificial turf pitches as well as replacing the temporary dressing rooms with permanent facilities. The same month, Waterford Benfica used the stadium as their home ground for a Munster FA's Women's Junior Cup game. Benfica returned to the RSC for their next cup game the following month.

== Structure and facilities ==
The RSC has two spectator areas; to the north-west of the ground, running parallel to the Cork Road, lies the Main Stand. The club shop is located under the Main Stand and the dugouts are located in front of this stand. The south-east of the ground is occupied by the Tramore Road Stand. Behind the goals at either end of the pitch, there is no stand or terracing for fans and so these areas are unused on match days.

== Other uses ==
=== Athletics ===
The stadium is also home to Ferrybank Athletic Club. The club, founded in 1980, were initially based in Ferrybank, Waterford and moved their training base to the RSC in 1999.

=== Rugby union ===
In February 2010, Munster A played Nottingham R.F.C. at the ground in the British and Irish Cup.

=== Sports development ===
The venue is also home to the Waterford branch of Sport Ireland's Local Sports Partnerships, who have their city offices at the stadium. The organisation is responsible for increasing participation in sport and physical activity in County Waterford.

== Records ==
The stadium's record attendance of 8,500 was set on 4 April 1997, when Waterford United lost 1–2 to Shelbourne in an FAI Cup semi-final.
