= Alexis Pittas =

Cypriot footballer (born 1979)

Personal information
- Full name: Alexis Pittas
- Date of birth: October 31, 1979 (age 46)
- Place of birth: Cyprus
- Height: 1.75 m (5 ft 9 in)
- Position: Winger

Team information
- Current team: MEAP Nisou

Senior career*
Years	Team	Apps	(Gls)
2001–2003	AC Omonia	21	(3)
2003–2005	Apollon Limassol	46	(10)
2005–2008	Olympiakos Nicosia	44	(11)
2008–2009	PAEEK FC		
2009–	MEAP Nisou		

International career
2004–2005	Cyprus		
- * Club domestic league appearances and goals as of 1 September 2007

Alexis Pittas (Greek: Αλέξης Πίττας) (born October 31, 1979) is a Cypriot winger who plays for MEAP Nisou. His former teams are Apollon Limassol and AC Omonia where he started his career.
