= Sergey Erzrumyan =

Armenian football midfielder

Personal information
- Full name: Sergey Erzrumyan
- Date of birth: 22 November 1980 (age 45)
- Place of birth: Yerevan, Soviet Union
- Height: 1.71 m (5 ft 7 in)
- Position: Midfielder

Team information
- Current team: Alashkert Martuni

Youth career
- –1997: FC Pyunik
1999–2001	Kilikia F.C.	40	(17)
2002	SKA Rostov	5	(1)
2003–2004	Kilikia F.C.	41	(14)
2004	FC Banants	1	(0)
2004–2006	Kilikia F.C.	7	(1)
2005–2006	→ Racing Beirut (loan)		
2007–2009	FC Ararat Yerevan	34	(2)
2009–2010	Gandzasar F.C.	27	(3)
2012–	Alashkert Martuni		

International career
Years	Team	Apps	(Gls)
	Armenia U-21	10	(2)

Sergey Erzrumyan (Armenian: Սերգեյ Էրզրումյան; born 22 November 1980), is an Armenian football midfielder, currently with Armenian First League club Alashkert Martuni.

Erzrumyan played for FC SKA Rostov-on-Don in the Russian First Division during the 2002 season, scoring once.
