= Kristof Imschoot =

Belgian footballer

Personal information
- Date of birth: 4 December 1980 (age 45)
- Place of birth: Dendermonde, Belgium
- Height: 1.83 m (6 ft 0 in)
- Position: Midfielder

Team information
- Current team: RFC Wetteren

Senior career*
Years	Team	Apps	(Gls)
1999–2001	Beveren	35	(2)
2001–2006	Lierse	110	(14)
2006–2007	Willem II	29	(3)
2007–2009	KV Mechelen	47	(3)
2009–2010	Dender	29	(10)
2010–2012	Enosis Neon Paralimni	39	(4)
2012–2013	R. Cappelleni	25	(6)
2013–2015	Wetteren-Kwatrecht		
2015–	RFC Wetteren		
- * Club domestic league appearances and goals as of 6 December 2015

Kristof Imschoot (born 4 December 1980) is a Belgian footballer who plays as a midfielder for RFC Wetteren. He has also played for Beveren, Lierse, Willem II, KV Mechelen and Dender.

== Life and career ==
Imschoot was born in the city of Dendermonde. He began his professional career with Beveren and made his first team debut during the 1999–2000 season. Two years later, Imschoot joined Lierse and went on to score 14 goals in 110 league appearances in five seasons with the club. He spent the 2006–07 season with Dutch side Willem II and then returned to Belgium to play for KV Mechelen, scoring three goals in 47 league games. Imschoot joined Dender in 2009 and scored 10 goals in 29 appearances during his one season with the club. He moved to Cyprus in 2010 to sign for Enosis Neon Paralimni.
