= Vincent Lachambre =

Belgian footballer

Personal information
- Full name: Vincent Lachambre
- Date of birth: 6 November 1980 (age 45)
- Place of birth: Brussels, Belgium
- Height: 1.77 m (5 ft 10 in)
- Position: Left back

Senior career*
Years	Team	Apps	(Gls)
1998–2000	RWD Molenbeek	54	(0)
2000–2001	RC Harelbeke	29	(0)
2001–2011	Roda JC	77	(0)
2004–2005	→ FC Eindhoven (loan)	13	(2)
2012	KVK Tienen-Hageland	12	(0)
2012–2013	RFC Union Kelmis	9	(0)
2014–2016	Solières Sport		
2016–2017	FC United Richelle		

International career
1995	Belgium U15	1	(0)
1998	Belgium U18	8	(0)
1998	Belgium U19	4	(0)
2002	Belgium U21	6	(0)
- * Club domestic league appearances and goals

Vincent Lachambre (born 6 November 1980) is a retired Belgian footballer.

== Career ==
He spent for nine seasons at Dutch club Roda JC. Lachambre is a defender who was born in Brussels and made his debut in professional football, being part of the KRC Harelbeke squad in the 2000–01 season. He also played for Eerste Divisie side FC Eindhoven before joining Roda JC for the second time in his career.
