= Reto Bolli =

Swiss footballer (born 1979)

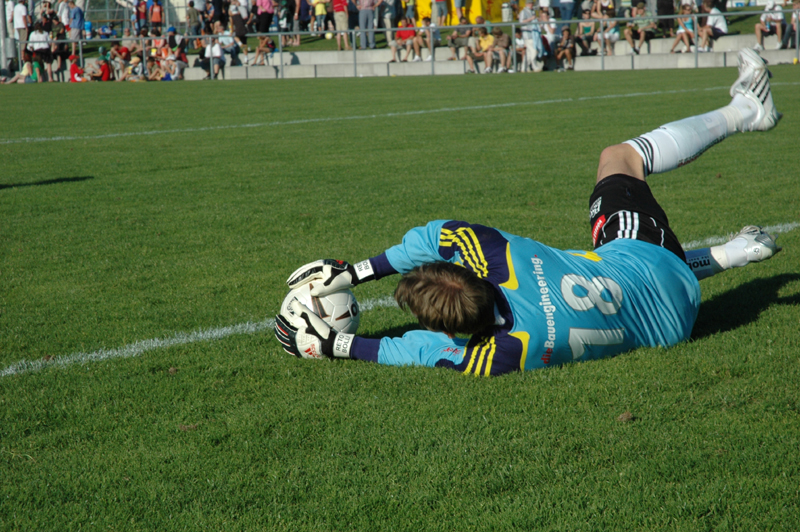

Personal information
- Full name: Reto Bolli
- Date of birth: 2 March 1979 (age 47)
- Place of birth: Switzerland
- Height: 1.84 m (6 ft 1/2 in)
- Position: Goalkeeper

Senior career*
Years	Team	Apps	(Gls)
1999–2002	FC Locarno	85	(0)
2002–2004	AC Bellinzona	66	(0)
2004–2006	FC Locarno	36	(0)
2006–2008	FC Schaffhausen	13	(0)
2008–2011	FC St. Gallen	3	(0)
2011–2013	FC Aarau	3	(0)
Total		206	(0)
- * Club domestic league appearances and goals

Reto Bolli (born 2 March 1979) is a Swiss former professional footballer.
