= Märt Kosemets =

Estonian footballer

Personal information
- Full name: Märt Kosemets
- Date of birth: 25 January 1981 (age 45)
- Place of birth: Tallinn, then part of Estonian SSR, Soviet Union
- Height: 1.80 m (5 ft 11 in)
- Positions: Defender; midfielder

Senior career*
Years	Team	Apps	(Gls)
1999	Lelle SK	24	(2)
2000–2001	FC Flora Tallinn	25	(1)
2001–2003	FC Valga	32	(1)
2004	JK Tulevik Viljandi	14	(2)
2004	FC Elva	1	(0)
2005	FC Flora Tallinn	25	(0)
2005	JK Tervis Pärnu	15	(0)
2006–	JK Tulevik Viljandi	48	(2)
Total		184	(8)

International career
2000–2004	Estonia	6	(0)
2008	Estonia (futsal)	2	(0)
- * Club domestic league appearances and goals as of 19 December 2007

Märt Kosemets (born 25 January 1981) is a retired Estonian professional footballer, who last played in the Meistriliiga, for JK Viljandi Tulevik, whom he joined from Flora Tallinn after the 2005 season. He played the position of defender and midfielder. He is 1.80 m tall and weighs 67 kg.

== International career ==
He has made a total of 6 appearances for the Estonia national football team. He made his international debut in 2000.
