= Giannis Liourdis =

Greek footballer

Personal information
- Full name: Ioannis Liourdis
- Date of birth: 27 February 1979 (age 47)
- Place of birth: Patras, Greece
- Height: 1.90 m (6 ft 3 in)
- Position: Goalkeeper

Team information
- Current team: Ikaros Petroto

Youth career
- Petroto

Senior career*
Years	Team	Apps	(Gls)
1998–2004	Paniliakos		
2004–2006	Ethnikos Asteras	22	(0)
2006–2008	Panetolikos	43	(0)
2008–2009	Panachaiki	4	(0)
2009–2011	Platanias	57	(0)
2011–2013	Diagoras Vraxneika		
2013–2014	Doxa Nea Manolada F.C.	8	(0)
2014–	Ikaros Petroto		
- * Club domestic league appearances and goals

Giannis Liourdis (born 27 February 1979) is a Greek former professional footballer who played as a goalkeeper.

Liourdis previously played in the Greek Super League with Paniliakos
