= Switzerland national under-21 football team =

National under-21 association football team representing Switzerland

Switzerland Under-21
- Association: Swiss Football Association
- Head coach: Alex Frei
- Most caps: Alain Rochat (42)
- Top scorer: Hakan Yakin (12)
First colours	Second colours

First international
- Greece 2–1 Switzerland; Rhodos, Greece; 28 March 1990

Biggest win
- Switzerland 6–0 Luxembourg; Muri, Switzerland; 27 March 2001; Switzerland 7–1 Latvia; Lugano, Switzerland; 8 September 2014

Biggest defeat
- Switzerland 3–7 Norway; Biel, Switzerland; 9 November 1996 Records for competitive matches only.

UEFA U-21 Championship
- Appearances: 5 (first in 2002)
- Best result: Runners-up (2011)

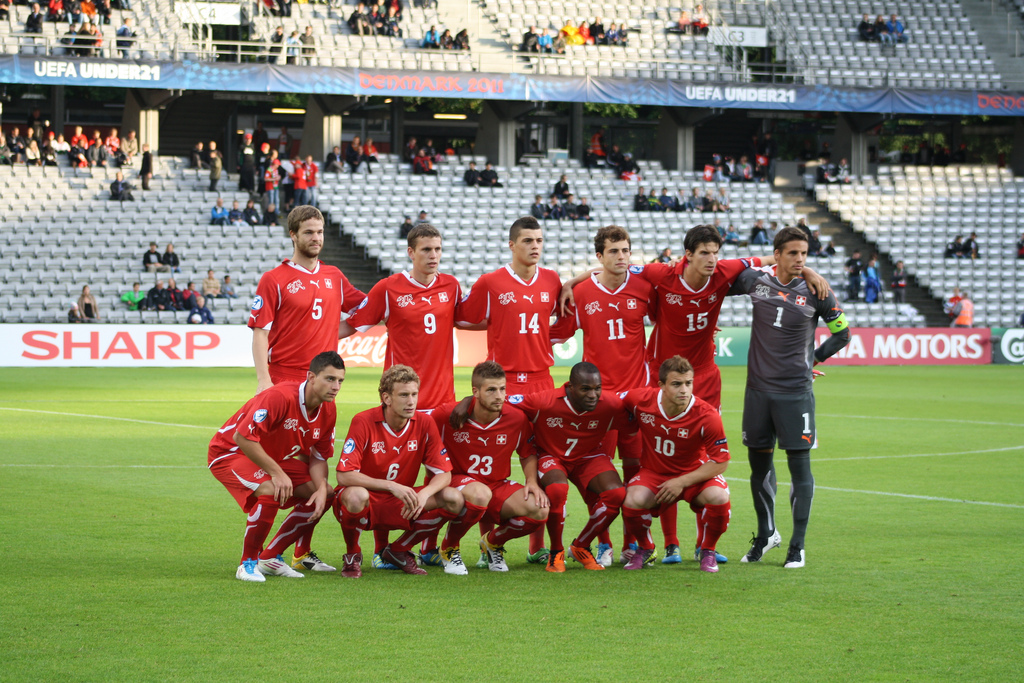
Switzerland national under-21 football team at the 2011 UEFA European Under-21 Championship

The Switzerland national under-21 football team is the national under-21 football team of Switzerland and is controlled by the Swiss Football Association. The team competes in the UEFA European Under-21 Championship, which is held every two years.

== UEFA U-23 championship record ==
Since the under-21 competition rules insist that players must be 21 or under at the start of a two-year competition, technically it is an U-23 competition. For this reason, Switzerland's record in the preceding U-23 competitions is also shown.

- 1972: Did not qualify. Finished 2nd of 2 in qualification group
- 1974: Did not enter
- 1976: Did not enter

== UEFA U-21 Championship record ==
Year	Round	Pld	W	D*	L	GF	GA	Squad
1978	Did not qualify							
1980	Did not qualify							
1982	Did not qualify							
1984	Did not qualify							
1986	Did not qualify							
1988	Did not qualify							
1990	Did not qualify							
1992	Did not qualify							
(France) 1994	Did not qualify							
(Spain) 1996	Did not qualify							
(Romania) 1998	Did not qualify							
(Slovakia) 2000	Did not qualify							
(Switzerland) 2002	Semi-finals	4	1	1	2	3	4	Squad
(Germany) 2004	Group stage	3	0	1	2	4	7	Squad
(Portugal) 2006	Did not qualify							
(Netherlands) 2007	Did not qualify							
(Sweden) 2009	Lost in qualifying play-off to Spain							
(Denmark) 2011	Runners-up	5	4	0	1	7	2	Squad
(Israel) 2013	Lost in qualifying play-off to Germany							
(Czech Republic) 2015	Did not qualify							
(Poland) 2017	Did not qualify							
(Italy) 2019	Did not qualify							
(Hungary) (Slovenia) 2021	Group stage	3	1	0	2	3	6	Squad
(Romania) (Georgia (country)) 2023	Quarter-finals	4	1	0	3	6	10	Squad
(Slovakia) 2025	Did not qualify							
Total	5/24	19	7	2	10	23	31	—

*Denotes draws including knockout matches decided via penalty shoot-out.

== Coaches ==
- 1995–2001: (Switzerland) Köbi Kuhn
- 2001–2007: (Switzerland) Bernard Challandes
- 2007–2009: (Switzerland) Pierre-André Schürmann
- 2009–2015: (Switzerland) Pierluigi Tami
- 2015–2018: (Switzerland) Heinz Moser
- 2018–2022: (Switzerland) Mauro Lustrinelli
- 2022–2023: (Switzerland) Patrick Rahmen
- 2023–: (Switzerland) Sascha Stauch

== Players ==
=== Current squad ===
The following players were selected for the 2023 UEFA European Under-21 Championship on 15 June 2023.

Caps and goals correct as of 1 July 2023, after the match against Spain.

No.	Pos.	Player	Date of birth (age)	Caps	Goals	Club
1	GK	Amir Saipi	8 July 2000 (aged 22)	14	0	(Swiss Football Association) Lugano
12	GK	Nicholas Ammeter	11 December 2000 (aged 22)	0	0	(Swiss Football Association) Wil
21	GK	Marvin Keller	3 July 2002 (aged 20)	2	0	(Swiss Football Association) Young Boys
2	DF	Lewin Blum	27 July 2001 (aged 21)	11	0	(Swiss Football Association) Young Boys
3	DF	Nicolas Vouilloz	11 May 2001 (aged 22)	10	0	(Swiss Football Association) Servette
4	DF	Leonidas Stergiou (captain)	3 March 2002 (aged 21)	18	1	(German Football Association) VfB Stuttgart
5	DF	Marco Burch	19 October 2000 (aged 22)	13	1	(Swiss Football Association) Luzern
13	DF	Aurèle Amenda	31 July 2003 (aged 19)	3	0	(Swiss Football Association) Young Boys
16	DF	Serge Müller	18 September 2000 (aged 22)	6	0	(Swiss Football Association) Schaffhausen
17	DF	Jan Kronig	24 June 2000 (aged 22)	13	1	(Swiss Football Association) Aarau
20	DF	Bećir Omeragić	20 January 2002 (aged 21)	6	0	(Swiss Football Association) Zürich
6	MF	Simon Sohm	11 April 2001 (aged 22)	22	0	(Italian Football Federation) Parma
8	MF	Ardon Jashari	30 July 2002 (aged 20)	7	0	(Swiss Football Association) Luzern
10	MF	Kastriot Imeri	27 June 2000 (aged 22)	24	9	(Swiss Football Association) Young Boys
14	MF	Matteo Di Giusto	18 August 2000 (aged 22)	10	0	(Swiss Football Association) Winterthur
15	MF	Gabriel Barès	29 August 2000 (aged 22)	13	2	(Swiss Football Association) Thun
18	MF	Bledian Krasniqi	17 June 2001 (aged 22)	7	0	(Swiss Football Association) Zürich
19	MF	Darian Males	3 May 2001 (aged 22)	17	0	(Swiss Football Association) Basel
7	FW	Dan Ndoye	25 October 2000 (aged 22)	26	10	(Swiss Football Association) Basel
9	FW	Filip Stojilković	4 January 2000 (aged 23)	25	2	(Football Association of Serbia) OFK Beograd
11	FW	Julian von Moos	11 April 2001 (aged 22)	8	1	(Swiss Football Association) St. Gallen
22	FW	Fabian Rieder	16 February 2002 (aged 21)	15	2	(Swiss Football Association) Young Boys
23	FW	Zeki Amdouni	4 December 2000 (aged 22)	15	9	(Swiss Football Association) Basel

=== Recent call-ups ===
The following players have also been called up to the Switzerland under-17 squad within the last twelve months and remain eligible for selection.

Pos.	Player	Date of birth (age)	Caps	Goals	Club	Latest call-up
GK	Pascal Loretz	1 June 2003 (age 23)	1	0	(Switzerland) Luzern	
DF	Albian Hajdari	18 May 2003 (age 23)	3	0	(Switzerland) Lugano	
MF	Alvyn Sanches	12 February 2003 (age 23)	1	0	(Switzerland) Lausanne-Sport	
FW	Bradley Fink	17 April 2003 (age 23)	4	1	(Switzerland) Basel	

== Swiss national teams ==
- Switzerland national football team
- Switzerland national under-23 football team (also known as Swiss Olympic)
- Switzerland national under-20 football team
- Switzerland national under-19 football team
- Switzerland national under-18 football team
- Switzerland national under-17 football team
- Switzerland national under-16 football team

== See also ==
- UEFA European Under-21 Championship

== Sources/external links ==
- UEFA Under-21 website - contains full results archive
- The Rec.Sport.Soccer Statistics Foundation - contains full record of U-21/U-23 Championships
