= Bernard Challandes =

Swiss football coach (born 1951)

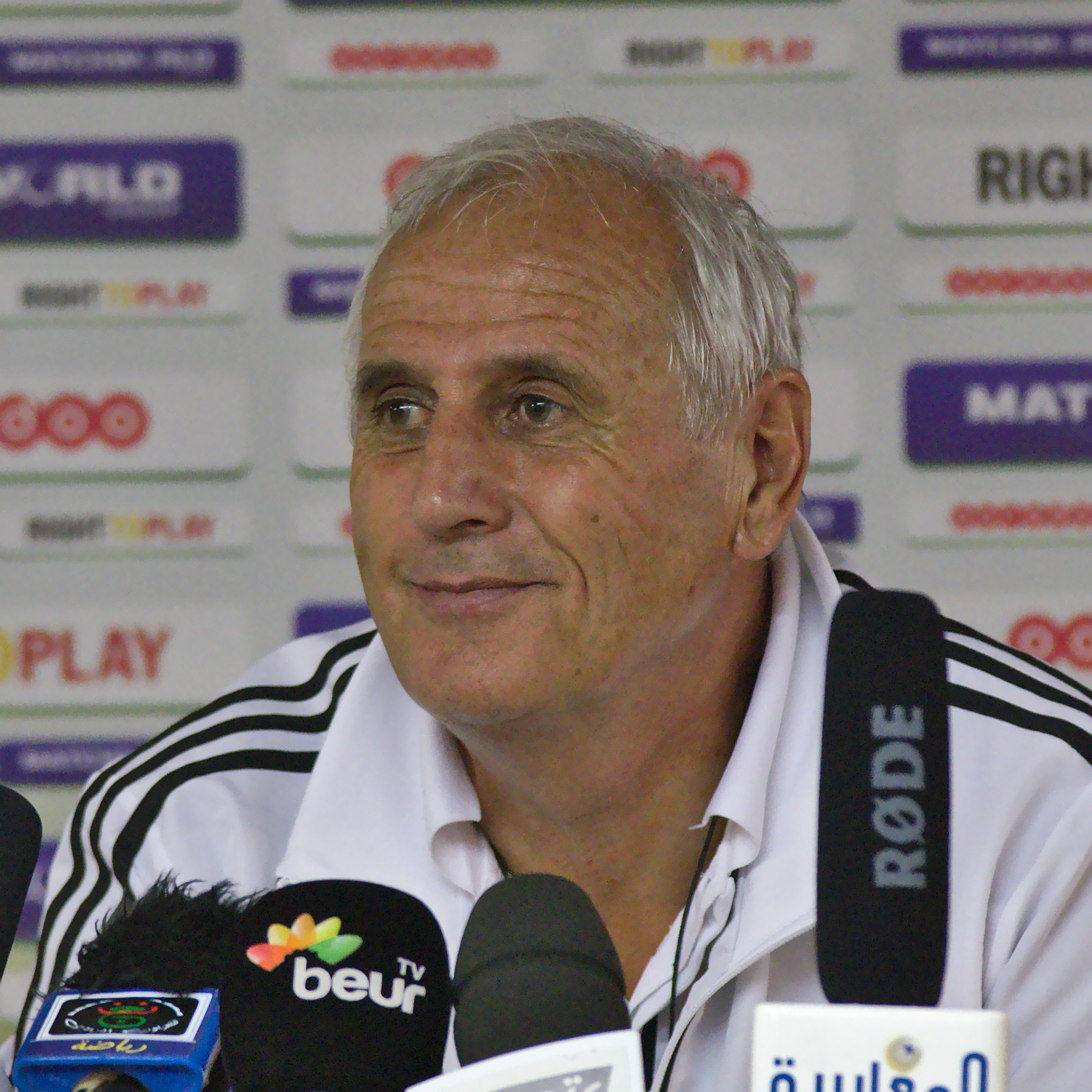
- Challandes with Armenia in May 2014

Personal information
- Date of birth: 26 July 1951 (age 75)
- Place of birth: Le Locle, Switzerland
- Height: 1.85 m (6 ft 1 in)
- Position: Defender

Youth career
- –1968: Le Locle

Senior career*
Years	Team	Apps	(Gls)
1968–1970	Le Locle		
1970–1972	Urania Genève Sport		
1972–1978	Le Locle		
1976–1977	→ Superga (loan)		
1977–1978	→ Boudry (loan)		
1978–1982	Saint-Imier		

Managerial career
- 1978–1982: Saint-Imier
- 1982–1985: Le Locle
- 1985–1987: La Chaux-de-Fonds
- 1987–1994: Yverdon Sports
- 1994–1995: Young Boys
- 1995: Servette
- 1996–2000: Switzerland U17
- 2000–2001: Switzerland U18
- 2001–2007: Switzerland U21
- 2007–2010: Zürich
- 2010–2011: Sion
- 2011: Neuchâtel Xamax
- 2011–2012: Thun
- 2013: Young Boys
- 2014–2015: Armenia
- 2015–2017: Basel (scout)
- 2018–2021: Kosovo
- * Club domestic league appearances and goals

Bernard Challandes (born 26 July 1951) is a Swiss former professional football coach and former player who last managed the Kosovo national team.

Challandes played as a defender during his playing career, representing clubs including Urania Genève Sport and several spells at Le Locle, as well as loan periods at Superga and Boudry.

He began his managerial career as player–coach at Saint-Imier before taking charge of several Swiss clubs, including FC La Chaux-de-Fonds, Yverdon Sports, Young Boys, Servette, Zürich, Sion, Neuchâtel Xamax and Thun. He also coached Switzerland's youth national teams, including the U17, U18 and U21 sides.

Outside Switzerland, Challandes managed the Armenia national team from 2014 to 2015 before being appointed head coach of Kosovo in 2018, a role he held until 2021.

== Coaching career ==
=== Clubs ===
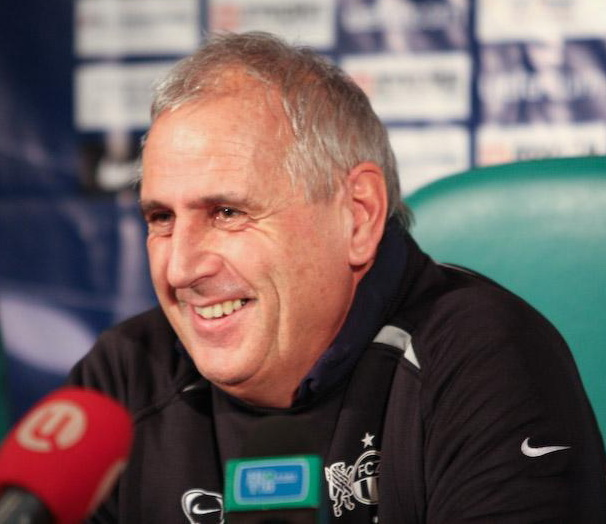
Challandes with Zürich in December 2007

Challandes became coach of Saint-Imier in 1978. Subsequently, he has been the coach of many other teams in the Swiss championship as Le Locle, La Chaux-de-Fonds, Yverdon Sports, Young Boys, Servette, Zürich, Sion, Neuchâtel Xamax and Thun. Challandes was most successful during the time he was coach of Zürich, when it became champions of the 2008–09 season, and with Sion when they won the Swiss Cup in the 2010–11 season. Since 2015, he has been the scout with Basel.

=== National teams ===
==== Armenia ====
On 28 February 2014, the Armenia national football team appointed Challandes as their manager with a two-year contract to lead the team during UEFA Euro 2016 qualifying after the former coach Vardan Minasyan decided in October 2013 not to sign a new deal with the Football Federation of Armenia, despite having an encouraging UEFA Euro 2012 qualifying and 2014 FIFA World Cup qualification campaigns. In May 2014. Challandes made his first squad announcement with Armenia for the friendly matches against United Arab Emirates and Algeria. He brought four new players into the squad: Aleksandr Tumasyan, Alex, Mauro Guevgeozián and Rumyan Hovsepyan. On 27 May 2014, Challandes had his first official match as Armenia manager in a 4–3 home win against United Arab Emirates. On 30 March 2015, Challandes resigned after Armenia failed to qualify for the UEFA Euro 2016.

==== Kosovo ====
On 2 March 2018, Kosovo appointed Challandes to a two-year contract after the former coach Albert Bunjaki decided to resign, after weak results, in October 2017. On 19 March 2018, Challandes made his first Kosovo squad announcement for the friendly matches against Madagascar and Burkina Faso, bringing in three new players: Edon Zhegrova, Gjelbrim Taipi and Idriz Voca. On 24 March 2018, Challandes had his first match as Kosovo manager in a 1–0 home win against Madagascar.

Under him, Kosovo won all three of friendly matches. In September 2018, the UEFA Nations League began. In the 3rd group of league D, Kosovo was in the group with Azerbaijan, Malta and Faroe Islands. Kosovo finished first in the group, giving it a chance to qualify for UEFA Euro 2020, through the knockout phase, in March 2020.

== Honours ==
=== Manager ===
Zurich

- 2008–09 Swiss Super League

Sion

- 2010–11 Swiss Cup

== Managerial record ==
As of match played 12 October 2021

Team	From	To	Record				
Team	From	To	G	W	D	L	Win %
Switzerland U21	1 July 2001	12 June 2007	63	27	14	22	42.86
Zürich	13 June 2007	19 April 2010	138	65	31	42	47.10
Sion	1 July 2010	22 February 2011	24	11	6	7	45.83
Neuchâtel Xamax	13 May 2011	30 May 2011	4	0	2	2	0.00
Thun	1 July 2011	20 November 2012	59	18	15	26	30.51
Young Boys	8 April 2013	30 June 2013	10	3	2	5	30.00
Armenia	28 February 2014	30 March 2015	9	1	1	7	11.11
Kosovo	2 March 2018	13 October 2021	40	18	8	14	45.00
Total			347	144	79	124	41.50
