= Albert Kaçi =

Albanian footballer

Personal information
- Full name: Albert Kaçi
- Date of birth: 11 June 1981 (age 45)
- Place of birth: Shkodër, Albania
- Position: Midfielder

Senior career*
Years	Team	Apps	(Gls)
1999–2004	Vllaznia	80	(18)
2004–2007	Elbasani	74	(5)
2005	→ FC Luzern (loan)	7	(1)
2007–2009	Vllaznia	49	(3)
2009	Teuta	2	(0)
2010	Apolionia	16	(2)
2010	Vllaznia	14	(0)
2011	Elbasani	5	(1)
2011	Ada	6	(0)
2012–2013	Besëlidhja	22	(6)
2013–2014	Ada	13	(2)
- * Club domestic league appearances and goals as of 19 May 2010

Albert Kaçi (born 11 June 1981) is an Albanian retired football player who last played in midfield for Ada Velipojë in the Albanian First Division.

== Club career ==
He played in UEFA Cup 2005-06, UEFA Champions League 2006-07 qualify rounds for Elbasani. He then played in UEFA Intertoto Cup 2007 and UEFA Cup 2008-09 qualify round for Vllaznia Shkodër.
