= Davy Theunis =

Belgian footballer

Personal information
- Date of birth: January 28, 1980 (age 46)
- Place of birth: Beveren, Belgium
- Height: 1.81 m (5 ft 11 in)
- Position: Defensive midfielder

Senior career*
| Years | Team | Apps | (Gls) |
| July 1998- July 2003 | KSK Beveren | | |
| July 2003 - July 2004 | KAA Gent | | |
| Jul 2004 - Jul 2006 | FC Brüssel | | |
| Jul 2006 - Jul 2008 | KSK Beveren | | |
| Jul 2008 - Jan 2009 | KJV Kruibeke | | |
| Jul 2010 - Sep 2010 | KSK Kieldrecht | | |

International career
| | Belgium U21 | 1 | |
- * Club domestic league appearances and goals

Davy Theunis (born 28 January 1980 in Beveren, Belgium) is a former football player from Belgium who retired in September 2010. Theunis was right-footed and primarily played in defensive midfield, although made a handful of appearances at both left-back and right-back.
