= 1988 UEFA European Under-21 Championship =

Tournament details
- Dates: 16 February – 12 October
- Teams: 30 (from 1 confederation)

Final positions
- Champions: France (1st title)
- Runners-up: Greece

Tournament statistics
- Matches played: 98
- Goals scored: 261 (2.66 per match)
- Attendance: 143,886 (1,468 per match)
- Top scorer: (Greece) Aris Karasavvidis (5 goals)
- Best player: (France) Laurent Blanc

The 1988 UEFA European Under-21 Championship, which spanned two years (1986–88), had 30 entrants. The Republic of Ireland competed for the first time. France U-21s won the competition.

The 30 national teams were divided into eight groups (six groups of 4 + two groups of 3). The group winners played off against each other on a two-legged home-and-away basis until the winner was decided. There was no finals tournament or third-place playoff.

== Draw ==
The allocation of teams into qualifying groups was based on that of UEFA Euro 1988 qualifying tournament with several changes, reflecting the absence of some nations:

- Group 1 featured the same teams
- Group 2 did not include Malta
- Group 3 did not include Iceland (moved to Group 6)
- Group 4 did not include Northern Ireland
- Group 5 did not include Netherlands (moved to Group 8)
- Group 6 did not include Wales, but included Iceland (moved from Group 3)
- Group 7 did not include Bulgaria and Luxembourg (both moved to Group 8)
- Group 8 composed of Bulgaria and Luxembourg (both moved from Group 7), Netherlands (moved from Group 5) and West Germany (who did not participate in senior Euro qualification)

=== Qualifying Round 1 ===
| Pos | Team | Pld | W | D | L | GF | GA | GD | Pts | Qualification |
|---|---|---|---|---|---|---|---|---|---|---|
| 1 | Spain | 6 | 4 | 2 | 0 | 9 | 1 | +8 | 10 | Advance to finals |
| 2 | Romania | 6 | 3 | 0 | 3 | 7 | 7 | 0 | 6 | |
| 3 | Austria | 6 | 2 | 2 | 2 | 5 | 7 | −2 | 6 | |
| 4 | Albania | 6 | 0 | 2 | 4 | 4 | 10 | −6 | 2 | |

== Matches ==
All times are local (UTC+1)

=== Romania vs Austria ===
9 September 1986
12:00 CET (UTC+1)

| Romania | 1–0 | Austria |
|---|---|---|
| Mihali 35' |

Attendance: 12,000
Referee: Carlo Longhi

=== Austria vs Albania ===
14 October 1986
12:00 CET (UTC+1)

| Austria | 1–0 | Albania |
|---|---|---|
| Kostenberger 85' |

Attendance: 2,000
Referee: Laszlo Padar
- Spain 1–0 Romania
- Albania 0–0 Spain
- Romania 3–2 Albania
- Austria 1–1 Spain
- Albania 1–1 Austria
- Romania 0–1 Spain
- Spain 3–0 Austria
- Albania 1–2 Romania
- Austria 2–1 Romania
- Spain 3–0 Albania

| Qualifying Group 2 | | P | W | D | L | F | A | Pts |
|---|---|---|---|---|---|---|---|---|
| **1** | **Italy** | 6 | 3 | 3 | 0 | 14 | 4 | 9 |
| **2** | Sweden | 6 | 1 | 4 | 1 | 6 | 6 | 6 |
| **3** | Switzerland | 6 | 1 | 3 | 2 | 4 | 7 | 5 |
| **4** | Portugal | 6 | 2 | 0 | 4 | 8 | 15 | 4 |

- Sweden 0–0 Switzerland
- Portugal 2–0 Sweden
- Switzerland 3–1 Portugal
- Italy 1–1 Switzerland
- Portugal 1–2 Italy
- Sweden 2–2 Italy
- Switzerland 0–0 Sweden
- Sweden 4–2 Portugal
- Switzerland 0–3 Italy
- Portugal 2–0 Switzerland
- Italy 0–0 Sweden
- Italy 6–0 Portugal

| Qualifying Group 3 | | P | W | D | L | F | A | Pts |
|---|---|---|---|---|---|---|---|---|
| **1** | **France** | 6 | 3 | 2 | 1 | 8 | 6 | 8 |
| **2** | East Germany | 6 | 2 | 3 | 1 | 10 | 6 | 7 |
| **3** | Soviet Union | 6 | 3 | 0 | 3 | 7 | 9 | 6 |
| **4** | Norway | 6 | 0 | 3 | 3 | 3 | 7 | 3 |

- Norway 0–0 E.Germany
- France 2–1 USSR
- USSR 1–0 Norway
- E.Germany 1–0 France
- USSR 2–1 E.Germany
- Norway 0–2 USSR
- Norway 1–2 France
- USSR 0–1 France
- E.Germany 5–1 USSR
- France 1–1 Norway
- E.Germany 1–1 Norway
- France 2–2 E.Germany

| Qualifying Group 4 | | P | W | D | L | F | A | Pts |
|---|---|---|---|---|---|---|---|---|
| **1** | **England** | 4 | 1 | 3 | 0 | 7 | 3 | 5 |
| **2** | Turkey | 4 | 1 | 2 | 1 | 4 | 6 | 4 |
| **3** | Yugoslavia | 4 | 1 | 1 | 2 | 7 | 9 | 3 |

- Yugoslavia 3–0 Turkey
- England 1–1 Yugoslavia
- Turkey 0–0 England
- England 1–1 Turkey
- Yugoslavia 1–5 England
- Turkey 3–2 Yugoslavia

| Qualifying Group 5 | | P | W | D | L | F | A | Pts |
|---|---|---|---|---|---|---|---|---|
| **1** | **Greece** | 6 | 4 | 1 | 1 | 15 | 5 | 9 |
| **2** | Hungary | 6 | 3 | 1 | 2 | 12 | 7 | 7 |
| **3** | Poland | 6 | 3 | 0 | 3 | 5 | 6 | 6 |
| **4** | Cyprus | 6 | 1 | 0 | 5 | 4 | 18 | 2 |

- Poland 1–0 Greece
- Greece 2–1 Hungary
- Cyprus 0–4 Greece
- Greece 5–1 Cyprus
- Cyprus 2–1 Hungary
- Poland 3–0 Cyprus
- Greece 2–0 Poland
- Hungary 3–0 Poland
- Poland 0–1 Hungary
- Hungary 2–2 Greece
- Cyprus 0–1 Poland
- Hungary 4–1 Cyprus

| Qualifying Group 6 | | P | W | D | L | F | A | Pts |
|---|---|---|---|---|---|---|---|---|
| **1** | **Czechoslovakia** | 6 | 3 | 2 | 1 | 14 | 8 | 8 |
| **2** | Denmark | 6 | 2 | 2 | 2 | 7 | 6 | 6 |
| **3** | Finland | 6 | 2 | 1 | 3 | 8 | 11 | 5 |
| **4** | Iceland | 6 | 1 | 3 | 2 | 9 | 13 | 5 |

- Finland 2–0 Iceland
- Iceland 0–4 Czechoslo.
- Czechoslo. 2–0 Finland
- Denmark 4–1 Finland
- Czechoslo. 1–1 Denmark
- Finland 0–1 Denmark
- Denmark 0–1 Czechoslo.
- Iceland 0–0 Denmark
- Iceland 2–2 Finland
- Denmark 1–3 Iceland
- Finland 3–2 Czechoslo.
- Czechoslo. 4–4 Iceland

| Qualifying Group 7 | | P | W | D | L | F | A | Pts |
|---|---|---|---|---|---|---|---|---|
| **1** | **Scotland** | 4 | 3 | 1 | 0 | 7 | 2 | 7 |
| **2** | Belgium | 4 | 0 | 3 | 1 | 1 | 2 | 3 |
| **3** | Republic of Ireland | 4 | 0 | 2 | 2 | 3 | 7 | 2 |

- Belgium 0–0 R. Ireland
- R. Ireland 1–2 Scotland
- Scotland 4–1 R. Ireland
- Belgium 0–0 Scotland
- R. Ireland 1–1 Belgium
- Scotland 1–0 Belgium

| Qualifying Group 8 | | P | W | D | L | F | A | Pts |
|---|---|---|---|---|---|---|---|---|
| **1** | **Netherlands** | 6 | 5 | 0 | 1 | 12 | 5 | 10 |
| **2** | Bulgaria | 6 | 4 | 0 | 2 | 8 | 7 | 8 |
| **3** | West Germany | 6 | 3 | 0 | 3 | 12 | 9 | 6 |
| **4** | Luxembourg | 6 | 0 | 0 | 6 | 2 | 13 | 0 |

- W.Germany 2–0 Bulgaria
- Bulgaria 1–0 Netherlands
- Luxem. 0–2 Netherlands
- W.Germany 4–1 Luxem.
- Bulgaria 1–0 Luxembourg
- Nether. 3–1 W.Germany
- Luxembourg 0–1 Bulgaria
- Netherlands 1–0 Luxem.
- Luxem. 1–4 W.Germany
- W.Germany 0–2 Nether.
- Bulgaria 2–1 W.Germany
- Netherlands 4–3 Bulgaria

=== Qualified teams ===
| Country | Qualified as | Previous appearances in tournament^{1} |
|---|---|---|
| Spain | Group 1 winner | 3 (1982, 1984, **1986**) |
| Italy | Group 2 winner | 5 (1978, 1980, 1982, 1984, 1986) |
| France | Group 3 winner | 3 (1982, 1984, 1986) |
| England | Group 4 winner | 5 (1978, 1980, **1982**, **1984**, 1986) |
| Greece | Group 5 winner | 0 (Debut) |
| Czechoslovakia | Group 6 winner | 2 (1978, 1980) |
| Scotland | Group 7 winner | 3 (1980, 1982, 1984) |
| Netherlands | Group 8 winner | 0 (Debut) |

^{1} Bold indicates champion for that year

== Squads ==
See 1988 UEFA European Under-21 Championship squads

== Knockout stage ==
Quarter-finals
Scotland | 0 | 0 | 0
England | 1 | 1 | 2
France | 2 | 2 | 4
Italy | 1 | 2 | 3
Greece | 1 | 2 | 3
Czechoslovakia | 1 | 2 | 3
Netherlands | 2 | 1 | 3
Spain | 1 | 0 | 1

Semi-finals
England | 2 | 2 | 4
France | 4 | 2 | 6
Greece | 5 | 0 | 5
Netherlands | 0 | 2 | 2

Finals
France | 0 | 3 | 3
Greece | 0 | 0 | 0

=== Quarter-finals ===
==== First leg ====
16 February 1988

| Scotland | 0–1 | England |
|---|---|---|
| | Report | Porter 83' |

Pittodrie Stadium, Aberdeen
Attendance: 14,200
Referee: Bo Karlsson (Sweden)

16 March 1988

| France | 2–1 | Italy |
|---|---|---|
| Paille 81'; Sauzée 90' | Report | Maldini 51' |

Stade Marcel Picot, Nancy
Attendance: 13,462
Referee: Lajos Németh (Hungary)

2 March 1988

| Greece | 1–1 | Czechoslovakia |
|---|---|---|
| Borbokis 49' | Report | Němeček 65' |

Leoforos Alexandras Stadium, Athens
Attendance: 2,846
Referee: Ioan Igna (Romania)

24 February 1988

| Spain | 0–1 | Netherlands |
|---|---|---|
| | Report | Plomp 89' (pen.) |

La Condomina, Murcia
Attendance: 8,000
Referee: Renzo Peduzzi (Switzerland)

==== Second leg ====
22 April 1988

| England | 1–0 | Scotland |
|---|---|---|
| White 82' | Report |

City Ground, Nottingham
Attendance: 11,284
Referee: Karl-Heinz Tritschler (West Germany)

23 March 1988

| Italy | 2–2 | France |
|---|---|---|
| Rizzitelli 42'; Ciocci 63' | Report | Paille 83', 88' |

Stadio Riviera delle Palme, San Benedetto del Tronto
Attendance: 13,505
Referee: Helmut Kohl (Austria)

23 March 1988

| Czechoslovakia | 2–2 | Greece |
|---|---|---|
| Vakalopoulos 77' (o.g.); Litoš 84' | Report | Karasavvidis 20'; Kapouranis 86' |

Stadion Střelecký ostrov, České Budějovice
Attendance: 4,200
Referee: José dos Santos (Portugal)

23 March 1988

| Netherlands | 2–1 (a.e.t.) | Spain |
|---|---|---|
| van Loen 100'; Viscaal 108' | Report | Loren 40' |

Nieuw Galgenwaard, Utrecht
Attendance: 3,724
Referee: Einar Halle (Norway)

=== Semi-finals ===
==== First leg ====
13 April 1988

| France | 4–2 | England |
|---|---|---|
| Angloma 23'; Cantona 49'; Dogon 78'; Paille 83' | Report | Parker 40'; Stewart 60' (pen.) |

Stade Léo Lagrange, Besançon
Attendance: 20,000
Referee: Yusuf Namoğlu (Turkey)

13 April 1988

| Greece | 5–0 | Netherlands |
|---|---|---|
| Karasavvidis 10', 41', 73', 85'; Ikonomidis 13' | Report |

Karaiskakis Stadium, Piraeus
Attendance: 3,216
Referee: Klaus Peschel (West Germany)

==== Second leg ====
27 April 1988

| England | 2–2 | France |
|---|---|---|
| Gascoigne 5'; Silvestre 59' (o.g.) | Report | Cantona 56', 78' |

Highbury Stadium, London
Attendance: 5,661
Referee: Marcel Van Langenhove (Belgium)

27 April 1988

| Netherlands | 2–0 | Greece |
|---|---|---|
| Fraser 60'; Witschge 88' | Report |

Nieuw Galgenwaard, Utrecht
Attendance: 750
Referee: Aron Schmidhuber (West Germany)

=== Final ===
==== First leg ====
25 May 1988

| Greece | 0–0 | France |
|---|---|---|
| | Report |

Karaiskakis Stadium, Piraeus
Attendance: 21,038
Referee: Ion Crăciunescu (Romania)

==== Second leg ====
12 October 1988

| France | 3–0 | Greece |
|---|---|---|
| Sauzée 8', 55'; Silvestre 67' | Report |

Stade Léo Lagrange, Besançon
Attendance: 22,000
Referee: Kurt Röthlisberger (Switzerland)

== Goalscorers ==
5 goals

- (Greece) Aris Karasavvidis

4 goals

- (France) Stéphane Paille

3 goals

- (France) Eric Cantona
- (France) Franck Sauzée

1 goal

- (Czechoslovakia) Václav Němeček
- (Czechoslovakia) Marcel Litoš
- (England) Paul Gascoigne
- (England) Garry Parker
- (England) Gary Porter
- (England) Paul Stewart
- (England) David White
- (France) Jocelyn Angloma
- (France) Jean-Luc Dogon
- (France) Franck Silvestre
- (Greece) Stefanos Borbokis
- (Greece) Kostas Ikonomidis
- (Greece) Giorgos Kapouranis
- (Italy) Massimo Ciocci
- (Italy) Paolo Maldini
- (Italy) Ruggiero Rizzitelli
- (Netherlands) Henk Fraser
- (Netherlands) John van Loen
- (Netherlands) Gerrit Plomp
- (Netherlands) Eric Viscaal
- (Netherlands) Rob Witschge
- (Spain) Loren

Own goal

- (Greece) Pagonis Vakalopoulos (playing against Czechoslovakia)
- (France) Franck Silvestre (playing against England)
