= 1986 UEFA European Under-21 Championship =

Tournament details
- Dates: 12 March – 29 October
- Teams: 29 (from 1 confederation)

Final positions
- Champions: Spain (1st title)
- Runners-up: Italy

Tournament statistics
- Matches played: 92
- Goals scored: 249 (2.71 per match)
- Top scorer: (Italy) Gianluca Vialli (4 goals)
- Best player: (Spain) Manuel Sanchis

The 1986 UEFA European Under-21 Championship was the 5th staging of the UEFA European Under-21 Championship. The qualifying stage spanned two years (1984–86), had 29 entrants. Spain U-21s won the competition after a penalty shootout, the first in the U-21 competition's history.

The 29 national teams were divided into eight groups (five groups of 4 + three groups of 3). The group winners played off against each other on a two-legged home-and-away basis until the winner was decided. There was no finals tournament or 3rd-place playoff.

== Qualifying stage ==
=== Draw ===
The allocation of teams into qualifying groups was based on that of 1986 FIFA World Cup qualification with several changes, reflecting the absence of some nations:

- Group 1 did not include Belgium (moved to Group 8)
- Group 2 did not include Malta
- Group 3 did not include Northern Ireland
- Group 4 did not include Luxembourg (moved to Group 8)
- Group 5 featured the same nations
- Group 6 did not include Republic of Ireland
- Group 7 did not include Wales
- Group 8 composed of Belgium (moved from Group 1), Luxembourg (moved from Group 4) and Italy (who did not participate in World Cup qualification)

Qualifying group 1		P	W	D	L	F	A	Pts
**1**	**Poland**	4	3	0	1	10	4	6
**2**	Greece	4	2	0	2	6	8	4
**3**	Albania	4	1	0	3	3	7	2

- Poland 5–1 Greece
- Poland 2–0 Albania
- Greece 2–0 Albania
- Greece 2–1 Poland
- Albania 1–2 Poland
- Albania 2–1 Greece

Qualifying group 2		P	W	D	L	F	A	Pts
**1**	**Sweden**	6	4	1	1	7	3	9
**2**	West Germany	6	3	1	2	9	6	7
**3**	Czechoslovakia	6	2	1	3	6	8	5
**4**	Portugal	6	1	1	4	4	9	3

- Sweden 1–1 Portugal
- Portugal 0–1 Czechoslo.
- W. Germany 1–0 Sweden
- Portugal 0–1 Sweden
- Portugal 2–1 W.Germany
- Czechoslovakia 1–1 W. Germany
- Sweden 1–0 Czechoslo.
- Czechoslo. 3–1 Portugal
- Sweden 2–1 W.Germany
- Czechoslo. 0–2 Sweden
- W. Germany 2–0 Portugal
- W. Germany 3–1 Czecho.

Qualifying group 3		P	W	D	L	F	A	Pts
**1**	**England**	6	3	2	1	9	3	8
**2**	Finland	6	1	4	1	6	6	6
**3**	Romania	6	1	4	1	5	7	6
**4**	Turkey	6	0	4	2	3	7	4

- England 2–0 Finland
- Turkey 1–1 Finland
- Turkey 0–0 England
- Romania 1–0 Turkey
- Romania 0–0 England
- Finland 3–1 England
- Finland 2–2 Romania
- Romania 0–0 Finland
- England 3–0 Romania
- Finland 0–0 Turkey
- England 3–0 Turkey
- Turkey 2–2 Romania

Qualifying group 4		P	W	D	L	F	A	Pts
**1**	**France**	6	2	3	1	11	7	7
**2**	Bulgaria	6	3	1	2	14	12	7
**3**	East Germany	6	1	4	1	9	9	6
**4**	Yugoslavia	6	1	2	3	10	16	4

- Yugoslavia 1–2 Bulgaria
- E.Germany 1–1 Yugosl.
- France 2–1 Bulgaria
- France 1–1 E.Germany
- Yugoslavia 0–0 France
- Bulgaria 3–2 E.Germany
- Bulgaria 4–0 France
- Bulgaria 3–6 Yugoslavia
- E.Germany 1–1 France
- Yugosl. 2–3 E.Germany
- E.Germany 1–1 Bulgaria
- France 7–0 Yugoslavia

Qualifying group 5		P	W	D	L	F	A	Pts
**1**	**Hungary**	6	5	0	1	9	3	10
**2**	Netherlands	6	4	1	1	11	3	9
**3**	Austria	6	0	3	3	3	7	3
**4**	Cyprus	6	0	2	4	3	13	2

- Cyprus 1–1 Austria
- Hungary 2–0 Austria
- Netherlands 1–0 Hungary
- Austria 0–0 Netherlands
- Cyprus 1–3 Hungary
- Cyprus 1–3 Netherlands
- Netherlands 5–0 Cyprus
- Hungary 1–0 Cyprus
- Austria 1–2 Hungary
- Netherlands 2–1 Austria
- Austria 0–0 Cyprus
- Hungary 1–0 Netherlands

Qualifying group 6		P	W	D	L	F	A	Pts
**1**	**Denmark**	6	3	2	1	11	7	8
**2**	Norway	6	2	2	2	10	9	6
**3**	Soviet Union	6	3	0	3	8	8	6
**4**	Switzerland	6	1	2	3	7	12	4

- Norway 3–0 Switzerland
- Denmark 2–2 Norway
- Norway 2–1 USSR
- Switzerland 1–1 Denmark
- Switzerland 4–2 USSR
- USSR 1–0 Switzerland
- Denmark 1–0 USSR
- USSR 2–0 Denmark
- Denmark 4–1 Switzerland
- Norway 1–3 Denmark
- USSR 2–1 Norway
- Switzerland 1–1 Norway

Qualifying group 7		P	W	D	L	F	A	Pts
**1**	**Spain**	4	3	1	0	4	0	7
**2**	Scotland	4	1	1	2	1	4	3
**3**	Iceland	4	1	0	3	2	3	2

- Scotland 1–0 Iceland
- Scotland 0–2 Spain
- Spain 0–0 Scotland
- Iceland 2–0 Scotland
- Iceland 0–1 Spain
- Spain 1–0 Iceland

Qualifying group 8		P	W	D	L	F	A	Pts
**1**	**Italy**	4	3	1	0	15	2	7
**2**	Belgium	4	1	1	2	7	8	3
**3**	Luxembourg	4	1	0	3	5	17	2

- Belgium 5–1 Luxembourg
- Belgium 1–1 Italy
- Italy 5–1 Luxembourg
- Luxembourg 0–6 Italy
- Luxembourg 3–1 Belgium
- Italy 3–0 Belgium

=== Qualified teams ===
Country	Qualified as	Previous appearances in tournament^{1}
Poland	Group 1 winner	2 (1982, 1984)
Sweden	Group 2 winner	0 (Debut)
England	Group 3 winner	4 (1978, 1980, **1982**, **1984**)
France	Group 4 winner	2 (1982, 1984)
Hungary	Group 5 winner	2 (1978, 1980)
Denmark	Group 6 winner	1 (1978)
Spain	Group 7 winner	2 (1982, 1984)
Italy	Group 8 winner	4 (1978, 1980, 1982, 1984)

^{1} Bold indicates champion for that year

== Squads ==
See 1986 UEFA European Under-21 Championship squads

== Knockout stage ==
Quarter-finals
Poland	1	0	1
Hungary	0	5	5
France	1	1	2
Spain	3	3	6
Denmark	0	1	1
England	1	1	2
Sweden	1	1	2
Italy	1	2	3

Semi-finals
Hungary	3	1	4
Spain	1	4	5
England	0	1	1
Italy	2	1	3

Finals
Spain	1	2	3 (3)
Italy	2	1	3 (0)
