= 1972 UEFA European Under-23 Championship =

Tournament details
- Teams: 23 (from 1 confederation)

Final positions
- Champions: Czechoslovakia (1st title)
- Runners-up: Soviet Union

Tournament statistics
- Matches played: 63
- Goals scored: 162 (2.57 per match)

The 1972 UEFA European Under-23 Championship, which spanned two years (1970–72) had 23 entrants. Czechoslovakia U-23 won the competition.

The 23 national teams were divided into eight groups. The group winners played off against each other on a two-legged home-and-away basis until the winner was decided. There was no finals tournament or 3rd-place playoff.

== Qualifying stage ==
=== Draw ===
The allocation of teams into qualifying groups was based on that of UEFA Euro 1972 qualifying tournament with several changes, reflecting the absence of some nations:

- Group 2 and 8 had the same competing nations
- Group 1 did not include Wales
- Group 3 did not include England and Malta
- Group 4 did not include Northern Ireland and Cyprus
- Group 5 did not include Belgium and Scotland
- Group 6 did not include Republic of Ireland
- Group 7 did not include Luxembourg

=== Group 1 ===
		P	W	D	L	F	A	Pts
1	Czechoslovakia	4	2	2	0	8	4	6
2	Romania	4	2	1	1	5	3	5
3	Finland	4	0	1	3	4	10	1

- Finland 1–1 Czechoslovakia
- Finland 0–1 Romania
- Romania 1–1 Czechoslovakia
- Czechoslovakia 5–2 Finland
- Romania 3–1 Finland
- Czechoslovakia 1–0 Romania

Czechoslovakia qualify as group winners

=== Group 2 ===
		P	W	D	L	F	A	Pts
1	Bulgaria	6	4	1	1	9	3	9
2	Hungary	6	3	1	2	9	3	7
3	Norway	6	1	3	2	6	13	5
4	France	6	0	3	3	5	10	3

- Norway 1–0 Hungary
- France 0–0 Norway
- Bulgaria 5–0 Norway
- France 1–1 Hungary
- Bulgaria 1–0 Hungary
- Norway 1–1 Bulgaria
- Norway 4–4 France
- Hungary 2–0 Bulgaria
- Hungary 3–0 France
- Hungary 3–0 Norway
- Bulgaria 1–0 France
- France 0–1 Bulgaria

Bulgaria qualify as group winners

=== Group 3 ===
Qualifying Group 3		P	W	D	L	F	A	Pts
1	Greece	2	2	0	0	3	0	4
2	Switzerland	2	0	0	2	0	3	0

- Greece 1–0 Switzerland
- Switzerland 0–2 Greece

Greece qualify as group winners

=== Group 4 ===
		P	W	D	L	F	A	Pts
1	Soviet Union	2	1	1	0	3	2	3
2	Spain	2	0	1	1	2	3	1

Soviet Union qualify as group winners

30 May 1971

Spain	1–2	Soviet Union
Sergio 12'	Report	Onyshchenko 7'; Gershkovich 60'

La Rosaleda, Málaga
Attendance: 30,000
Referee: René Vigliani (France)
27 October 1971

Soviet Union	1–1	Spain
Dolbonosov (penalty missed) 8'; Piskaryov 48'	Report	Aguilar 12'

Shakhtar, Donetsk
Attendance: 40,000
Referee: Mario Clematide (Switzerland)

=== Group 5 ===
		P	W	D	L	F	A	Pts
1	Denmark	2	1	1	0	3	2	3
2	Portugal	2	0	1	1	2	3	1

- Portugal 1–1 Denmark
- Denmark 2–1 Portugal

Denmark qualify as group winners

=== Group 6 ===
		P	W	D	L	F	A	Pts
1	Sweden	4	3	0	1	8	2	6
2	Italy	4	2	0	2	6	7	4
3	Austria	4	1	0	3	3	8	2

- Italy 3–1 Austria
- Sweden 2–0 Austria
- Italy 1–0 Sweden
- Austria 0–2 Sweden
- Sweden 4–1 Italy
- Austria 2–1 Italy

Sweden qualify as group winners

=== Group 7 ===
		P	W	D	L	F	A	Pts
1	Netherlands	4	2	1	1	9	7	5
2	Yugoslavia	4	2	1	1	7	7	5
3	East Germany	4	1	0	3	5	7	2

- Netherlands 5–2 Yugoslavia
- East Germany 3–1 Netherlands
- Yugoslavia 1–1 Netherlands
- East Germany 0–1 Yugoslavia
- Netherlands 2–1 East Germany
- Yugoslavia 3–1 East Germany

Netherlands qualify as group winners

=== Group 8 ===
		P	W	D	L	F	A	Pts
1	West Germany	6	5	1	0	11	1	11
2	Poland	6	2	3	1	7	4	7
3	Albania	6	0	3	3	2	7	3
4	Turkey	6	0	3	3	0	8	3

- Albania 1–1 Poland
- Turkey 0–2 West Germany
- Turkey 0–0 Albania
- Albania 0–2 West Germany
- West Germany 3–0 Turkey
- Poland 2–1 Albania
- West Germany 2–0 Albania
- Turkey 0–0 Poland
- Poland 1–1 West Germany
- Albania 0–0 Turkey
- West Germany 1–0 Poland
- Poland 3–0 Turkey

West Germany qualify as group winners

== Knockout stage ==
Quarter-finals
Bulgaria (p)	2	0	2 (2)
Netherlands	2	0	2 (0)
Denmark	2	0	2
Greece	0	5	5
Soviet Union	3	0	3
West Germany	1	0	1
Sweden	1	1	2
Czechoslovakia	0	3	3

Semi-finals
Czechoslovakia	2	1	3
Greece	0	2	2
Soviet Union	4	3	7
Bulgaria	0	3	3

Finals
Soviet Union	2	1	3
Czechoslovakia	2	3	5

=== Matches ===
29 April 1972

Soviet Union	3–1	Germany
Gutsaev 52'; Yakubik 58'; Blokhin 72'	Report	Wunder 79'

Hrazdan, Yerevan
Attendance: 25,000
Referee: Egil Bergstad (Norway)
11 May 1972

Germany	0–0	Soviet Union
	Report

Bezirkssportanlage Westender Straße, Duisburg
Attendance: 24,000
Referee: Paul Bonett (Malta)
7 June 1972

Soviet Union	4–0	Bulgaria
Aleksandrov 5'; Nodia 19'; Blokhin 21'; Yakubik 76' (pen.); Zhukov (red card)	Report	Denev (red card); Panov (red card)

Stadion imeni Kirova, Leningrad
Attendance: 25,000
Referee: Stanisław Eksztajn (Poland)
14 June 1972

Bulgaria	3–3	Soviet Union
Mihaylov 19', 39', 60' (pen.)	Report	Gutsaev 31'; Zvyahintsev 44'; Mirikov 85'

Vasil Levski, Sofia
Attendance: 25,000
Referee: Heinz Einbeck (East Germany)
26 June 1972

Soviet Union	2–2	Czechoslovakia
Blokhin 51'; Gutsaev 69'	Report	Albrecht 66'; Melichar 87'

Tsentralnyi stadion imeni Lenina, Moscow
Attendance: 25,000
Referee: Hans-Joachim Weyland (West Germany)
30 June 1972

Czechoslovakia	3–1	Soviet Union
Gajdůšek 10'; Herda 11'; Albrecht 60'	Report	Blokhin 67'

Bazaly, Ostrava
Attendance: 15,000
Referee: Sergio Gonella (Italy)

== See also ==
- UEFA European Under-21 Championship
