= 1984 UEFA European Under-21 Championship =

Tournament details
- Dates: 28 February – 24 May
- Teams: 30 (from 1 confederation)

Final positions
- Champions: England (2nd title)
- Runners-up: Spain

Tournament statistics
- Matches played: 98
- Goals scored: 265 (2.7 per match)
- Top scorer: (England) Mark Hateley (6 goals)
- Best player: (England) Mark Hateley

The 1984 UEFA European Under-21 Championship was the 4th staging of the UEFA European Under-21 Championship. The qualifying stage spanned two years (1982–84) and had 30 entrants. Albania, Iceland and Wales competed in the competition for the first time. England U-21s won the competition for the second time running.

The 30 national teams were divided into eight groups (six groups of 4 + two groups of 3). The group winners played off against each other on a two-legged home-and-away basis until the winner was decided. There was no finals tournament or third-place playoff.

== Qualifying stage ==
=== Draw ===
The allocation of teams into qualifying groups was based on that of UEFA Euro 1984 qualifying tournament with several changes, reflecting the absence of some nations:

- Groups 1, 2 and 4 included the same nations
- Group 3 did not include Luxembourg (moved to Group 8)
- Group 5 did not include Sweden (moved to Group 8)
- Group 6 did not include Northern Ireland
- Group 7 did not include Malta and Republic of Ireland
- Group 8 composed of Sweden (moved from Group 5), Luxembourg (moved from Group 3) and France (who did not participate in senior Euro qualification)

Qualifying Group 1		P	W	D	L	F	A	Pts
**1**	**Scotland**	6	4	2	0	11	6	10
**2**	East Germany	6	3	1	2	13	14	7
**3**	Belgium	6	2	2	2	8	6	6
**4**	Switzerland	6	0	1	5	10	16	1

- Belgium 0–0 Switzerland
- Scotland 2–0 East Germany
- Switzerland 3–4 Scotland
- Belgium 1–2 Scotland
- East Germany 2–1 Belgium
- Scotland 2–1 Switzerland
- Belgium 4–2 East Germany
- Switzerland 5–6 East Germany
- East Germany 2–1 Switzerland
- Scotland 0–0 Belgium
- Switzerland 0–2 Belgium
- East Germany 1–1 Scotland

Qualifying Group 2		P	W	D	L	F	A	Pts
**1**	**Poland**	6	3	2	1	9	3	8
**2**	Soviet Union	6	2	3	1	8	6	7
**3**	Finland	6	1	3	2	5	8	5
**4**	Portugal	6	1	2	3	3	8	4

- Soviet Union 1–1 Poland
- Finland 0–0 Poland
- Finland 1–1 Portugal
- Portugal 1–0 Poland
- Soviet Union 2–2 Finland
- Poland 4–0 Finland
- Soviet Union 1–1 Portugal
- Poland 2–1 Soviet Union
- Finland 0–1 Soviet Union
- Portugal 0–2 Finland
- Poland 2–0 Portugal
- Portugal 0–2 Soviet Union

Qualifying Group 3		P	W	D	L	F	A	Pts
**1**	**England**	6	5	0	1	13	4	10
**2**	Greece	6	3	2	1	6	4	8
**3**	Hungary	6	1	1	4	7	8	3
**4**	Denmark	6	1	1	4	6	16	3

- Denmark 1–4 England
- Greece 1–0 England
- England 2–1 Greece
- Denmark 1–1 Greece
- England 1–0 Hungary
- Hungary 1–1 Greece
- Denmark 2–1 Hungary
- England 4–1 Denmark
- Hungary 0–2 England
- Hungary 5–1 Denmark
- Greece 1–0 Denmark
- Greece 1–0 Hungary

Qualifying Group 4		P	W	D	L	F	A	Pts
**1**	**Yugoslavia**	6	3	2	1	12	5	8
**2**	Bulgaria	6	3	2	1	6	3	8
**3**	Wales	6	2	2	2	5	6	6
**4**	Norway	6	0	2	4	6	15	2

- Wales 0–0 Norway
- Norway 2–2 Yugoslavia
- Bulgaria 2–0 Norway
- Bulgaria 0–2 Yugoslavia
- Yugoslavia 2–0 Wales
- Wales 0–1 Bulgaria
- Norway 0–2 Bulgaria
- Norway 2–3 Wales
- Yugoslavia 6–2 Norway
- Bulgaria 1–1 Wales
- Wales 1–0 Yugoslavia
- Yugoslavia 0–0 Bulgaria

Qualifying Group 5		P	W	D	L	F	A	Pts
**1**	**Italy**	6	5	0	1	9	3	10
**2**	Czechoslovakia	6	4	1	1	15	7	9
**3**	Romania	6	2	1	3	8	12	5
**4**	Cyprus	6	0	0	6	4	14	0

- Cyprus 1–2 Romania
- Italy 2–0 Romania
- Czechoslovakia 2–1 Italy
- Cyprus 0–1 Italy
- Czechoslo. 2–0 Cyprus
- Cyprus 1–4 Czechoslovakia
- Italy 2–1 Czechoslovakia
- Romania 1–4 Czechoslovakia
- Romania 0–1 Italy
- Romania 3–2 Cyprus
- Czechoslovakia 2–2 Romania
- Italy 2–0 Cyprus

Qualifying Group 6		P	W	D	L	F	A	Pts
**1**	**Albania**	6	4	2	0	9	3	10
**2**	West Germany	6	3	3	0	13	4	9
**3**	Turkey	6	1	1	4	6	11	3
**4**	Austria	6	0	2	4	4	14	2

- Austria 1–2 Albania
- Turkey 0–1 Albania
- Austria 1–1 Turkey
- Albania 1–1 West Germany
- Turkey 0–1 West Germany
- Austria 1–1 West Germany
- Albania 1–0 Turkey
- Albania 3–0 Austria
- West Germany 2–1 Austria
- West Germany 7–0 Turkey
- Turkey 5–0 Austria
- West Germany 1–1 Albania

Qualifying Group 7		P	W	D	L	F	A	Pts
**1**	**Spain**	4	2	1	1	2	5	5
**2**	Netherlands	4	1	2	1	7	3	4
**3**	Iceland	4	0	3	1	2	3	3

- Iceland 1–1 Netherlands
- Spain 1–0 Iceland
- Netherlands 5–0 Spain
- Iceland 0–0 Spain
- Netherlands 1–1 Iceland
- Spain 1–0 Netherlands

Qualifying Group 8		P	W	D	L	F	A	Pts
**1**	**France**	4	3	1	0	10	2	7
**2**	Sweden	4	2	1	1	10	4	5
**3**	Luxembourg	4	0	0	4	1	15	0

- Luxembourg 0–4 Sweden
- France 1–0 Sweden
- Luxembourg 0–5 France
- Sweden 4–1 Luxembourg
- Sweden 2–2 France
- France 2–0 Luxembourg

=== Qualified teams ===
Country	Qualified as	Previous appearances in tournament^{1}
Scotland	Group 1 winner	2 (1980, 1982)
Poland	Group 2 winner	1 (1982)
England	Group 3 winner	3 (1978, 1980, **1982**)
Yugoslavia	Group 4 winner	2 (**1978**, 1980)
Italy	Group 5 winner	3 (1978, 1980, 1982)
Albania	Group 6 winner	0 (Debut)
Spain	Group 7 winner	1 (1982)
France	Group 8 winner	1 (1982)

^{1} Bold indicates champion for that year

== Squads ==
See 1984 UEFA European Under-21 Championship squads

== Knockout stages ==
Quarter-finals
England	6	1	7
France	1	0	1
Albania	0	0	0
Italy	1	1	2
Scotland	2	1	3
Yugoslavia	1	3	4
Poland	2	1	3
Spain	2	4	6

Semi-finals
England	3	0	3
Italy	1	1	2
Yugoslavia	0	0	0
Spain	1	2	3

Final
England	1	2	3
Spain	0	0	0
