= 1976 UEFA European Under-23 Championship =

1976 UEFA European Under 23 Championship
Tournament details
- Teams: 23 (from 1 confederation)

Final positions
- Champions: Soviet Union U-23 (1st title)
- Runners-up: Hungary U-23
- Semifinalists: (Socialist Federal Republic of Yugoslavia) Yugoslavia U-23; Netherlands U-23

Tournament statistics
- Matches played: 58
- Goals scored: 173 (2.98 per match)

The 1976 UEFA European Under-23 Championship, which spanned two years (1974–76) had 23 entrants. Soviet Union U-23 won the competition.

The 23 national teams were divided into eight groups (seven groups of 3 + one group of 2). The group winners played off against each other on a two-legged home-and-away basis until the winner was decided. There was no finals tournament or 3rd-place playoff.

== Qualifying stage ==
=== Draw ===
The allocation of teams into qualifying groups was based on that of UEFA Euro 1976 qualifying tournament with several changes, reflecting the absence of some nations:

- Group 1 did not include Cyprus
- Group 2 did not include Wales
- Group 3 did not include Northern Ireland
- Group 4 did not include Spain
- Group 5 did not include Poland (moved to Group 8)
- Group 6 did not include Republic of Ireland and Switzerland
- Group 7 did not include Iceland
- Group 8 did not include West Germany and Malta, but included Poland (moved from Group 5)

Qualifying Group 1		P	W	D	L	F	A	Pts
1	England	4	3	1	0	9	4	7
2	Portugal	4	1	1	2	5	6	3
3	Czechoslovakia	4	0	2	2	3	7	2

- England 3–1 Czechoslovakia
- Portugal 2–3 England
- Portugal 2–0 Czechoslovakia
- Czechoslovakia 1–1 England
- Czechoslovakia 1–1 Portugal
- England 2–0 Portugal

England qualify as group winners

Qualifying Group 2		P	W	D	L	F	A	Pts
1	Hungary	4	3	1	0	11	2	7
2	Austria	4	1	2	1	6	6	4
3	Luxembourg	4	0	1	3	2	11	1

- Luxembourg 0–3 Hungary
- Luxembourg 1–3 Austria
- Austria 2–2 Hungary
- Hungary 2–0 Austria
- Austria 1–1 Luxembourg
- Hungary 4–0 Luxembourg

Hungary qualify as group winners

Qualifying Group 3		P	W	D	L	F	A	Pts
1	Yugoslavia	4	2	2	0	7	2	6
2	Sweden	4	2	1	1	6	6	5
3	Norway	4	0	1	3	1	6	1

- Yugoslavia 2–0 Norway
- Sweden 1–1 Yugoslavia
- Norway 0–0 Yugoslavia
- Norway 0–2 Sweden
- Sweden 2–1 Norway
- Yugoslavia 4–1 Sweden

Yugoslavia qualify as group winners

Qualifying Group 4		P	W	D	L	F	A	Pts
1	Scotland	4	4	0	0	11	2	8
2	Romania	4	1	1	2	8	9	3
3	Denmark	4	0	1	3	4	12	1

- Romania 6–2 Denmark
- Denmark 1–1 Romania
- Romania 1–2 Scotland
- Denmark 0–1 Scotland
- Scotland 4–1 Denmark
- Scotland 4–0 Romania

Scotland qualify as group winners

Qualifying Group 5		P	W	D	L	F	A	Pts
1	Netherlands	4	3	1	0	10	3	7
2	Italy	4	2	1	1	9	6	5
3	Finland	4	0	0	4	2	12	0

- Netherlands 3–0 Finland
- Netherlands 3–2 Italy
- Italy 3–0 Finland
- Finland 0–3 Netherlands
- Finland 2–3 Italy
- Italy 1–1 Netherlands

Netherlands qualify as group winners

Qualifying Group 6		P	W	D	L	F	A	Pts
1	Soviet Union	2	1	0	1	4	2	2
2	Turkey	2	1	0	1	2	4	2

- Turkey 2–1 Soviet Union
- Soviet Union 3–0 Turkey

Soviet Union qualify as group winners

Qualifying Group 7		P	W	D	L	F	A	Pts
1	France	4	2	1	1	6	5	5
2	East Germany	4	1	2	1	4	4	4
3	Belgium	4	1	1	2	4	5	3

- France 1–0 Belgium
- East Germany 1–1 France
- Belgium 0–0 East Germany
- East Germany 1–2 Belgium
- France 1–2 East Germany
- Belgium 2–3 France

France qualify as group winners

Qualifying Group 8		P	W	D	L	F	A	Pts
1	Bulgaria	4	3	0	1	6	3	6
2	Poland	4	2	0	2	7	5	4
3	Greece	4	1	0	3	4	9	2

- Greece 0–2 Bulgaria
- Bulgaria 2–1 Greece
- Poland 2–1 Bulgaria
- Poland 4–1 Greece
- Greece 2–1 Poland
- Bulgaria 1–0 Poland

Bulgaria qualify as group winners

== Knockout stages ==
Quarter-finals

- Netherlands 2–0 Scotland
- Scotland 2–0 Netherlands

2–2: Netherlands win 4–3 on penalties

- Hungary 3–0 England
- England 3–1 Hungary

Hungary win 4–3 on aggregate

- France 2–1 Soviet Union
- Soviet Union 2–1 France

3–3: Soviet Union win 4–2 on penalties

- Bulgaria 2–3 Yugoslavia
- Yugoslavia 2–1 Bulgaria

Yugoslavia win 5–3 on aggregate

Semi-finals

- Hungary 3–2 Yugoslavia
- Yugoslavia 1–1 Hungary

Hungary win 4–3 on aggregate

- Soviet Union 3–0 Netherlands
- Netherlands 1–0 Soviet Union

Soviet Union win 3–1 on aggregate

Final

- Hungary 1–1 Soviet Union
- Soviet Union 2–1 Hungary

Soviet Union win 3–2 on aggregate

Soviet Union finish as Champions

== See also ==
- UEFA European Under-21 Championship
