= UEFA European Under-21 Championship =

European association football tournament for under-21 national teams

- Organiser(s): UEFA
- Founded: 1978; 48 years ago
- Region: Europe
- Teams: 54 (total); 16 (finals)
- Current champions: England (4th title)
- Most championships: Italy; Spain (5 titles each)
- Website: uefa.com/under21
- 2027 UEFA European Under-21 Championship

The UEFA European Under-21 Championship, the UEFA Under-21 Championship or simply the Euro Under-21, is a biennial football competition contested by the European men's under-21 national teams of the UEFA member associations. Since 1992, the competition also serves as the UEFA qualification tournament for the Summer Olympics.

Italy and Spain are the most successful teams in the tournament's history, having won five titles each. England are the current champions, having beaten Germany 3–2 after extra time in the 2025 final.

== History ==
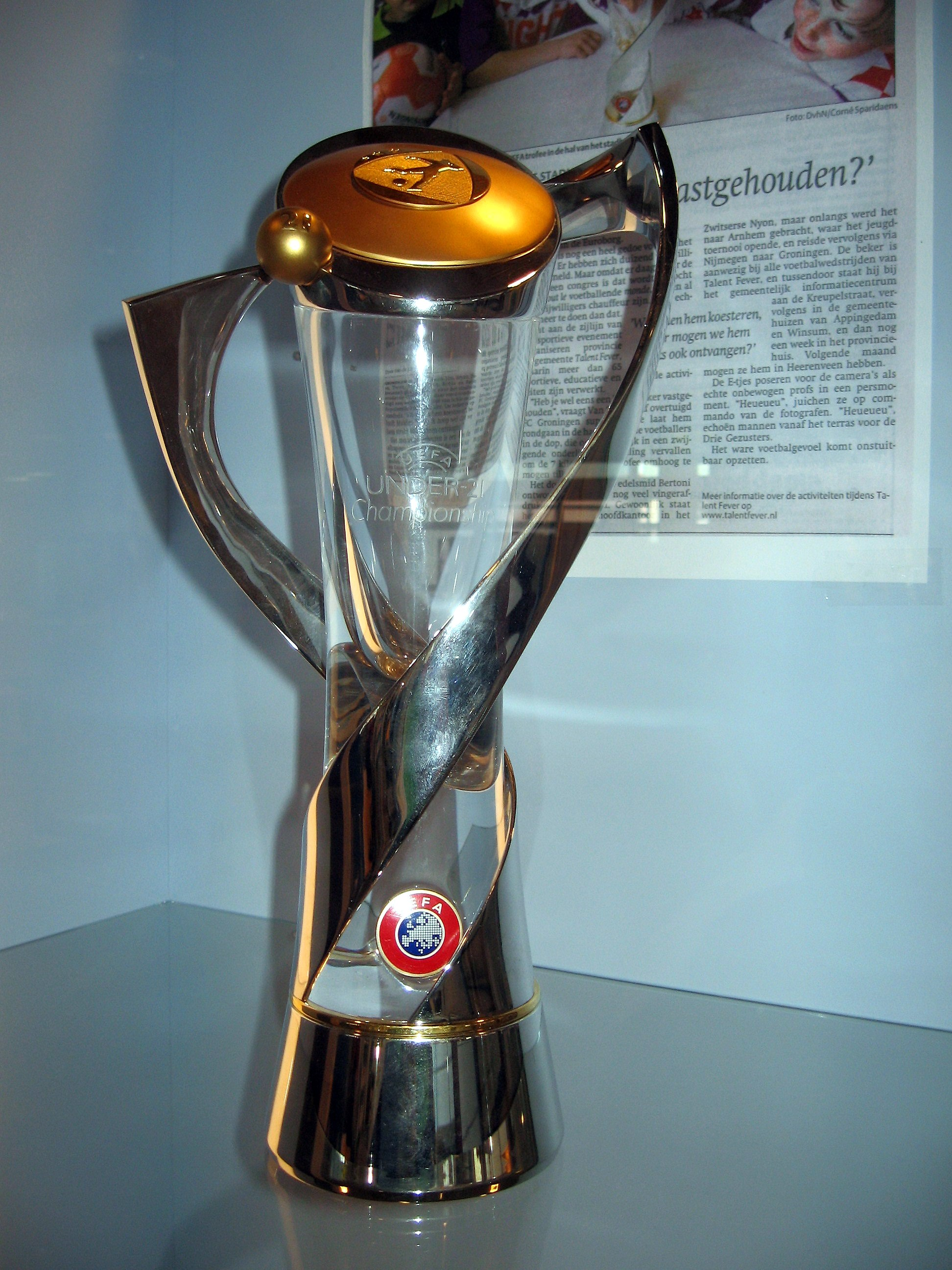
Trophy of the UEFA European Under-21 Championship

The competition in its current form has existed since 1978. It was preceded by the Under-23 Challenge Cup, which ran from 1967 to 1970. Bulgaria won the inaugural Challenge Cup in 1967, defeating East Germany 3–2. As defending champions, they faced randomly drawn "challengers" for a single match in Bulgaria. They retained the title three times, twice more in 1967 and once in 1968. By the final edition in 1970, only Bulgaria and Yugoslavia had won the competition.

A proper under-23 championship was then established, starting in 1972. It was held three times in the same format; the eight group winners contested the quarter-finals on a home-and-away basis. The semi-finals and final were also held over two legs. To overcome calendar issues, the qualifying groups were the same as the qualifying groups for the senior World Cup or European Championship, and the matches were played on the same day or weekend. This has changed starting with the 2006 edition, when a separate draw was held for the first time to form the qualifying groups.

At the UEFA conference in January 1976, the age limit was lowered to 21 for the 1978 tournament, and has remained so ever since. The rules at the time allowed each team to field two players over the age of 21. To be eligible for the campaign ending in 2027, players must be born in 2004 or later. Many may actually be 23 years old by the time of the final tournament; however, when the qualification process began (2025), all players would have been 21 or under.

In 1992, the Under-21 Championship became the European qualifying competition for the Olympic football tournament.

The tournament's record attendance was set during the knockout stage of the 2023 edition, when 44,338 spectators gathered for the match between hosts Georgia and Israel.

== Format ==
Up to and including the 1992 competition, all entrants were divided into eight qualification groups, the eight winners of which formed the quarter-finals line-up. The remaining fixtures were played out on a two-legged, home and away basis to determine the eventual winner.

For the 1994 competition, one of the semi-finalists, France, was chosen as a host for the (single-legged) semi-finals, third-place play-off and final. Similarly, Spain was chosen to host the last four matches in 1996.

For 1998, nine qualification groups were used, as participation had reached 46, nearly double the 24 entrants in 1976. The top seven group winners qualified automatically for the finals, whilst the eighth- and ninth-best qualifiers, Greece and England, played-off for the final spot. The remaining matches, from the quarter-finals onward, were held in Romania, one of the eight qualifiers.

The 2000 competition also had nine groups, but the nine winners and seven runners-up went into a two-legged play-off to decide the eight qualifiers. From those, Slovakia was chosen as host. For the first time, the familiar finals group stage was employed, with the two winners contesting a final, and two runners-up contesting the third-place play-off. The structure in 2002 was identical, except for the introduction of a semi-finals round after the finals group stage. Switzerland hosted the 2002 finals.

In 2004, ten qualification groups were used, with the group winners and six best runners-up going into the play-off. Germany was host that year. For 2006, the top two teams of eight large qualification groups provided the 16 teams for the play-offs, held in November 2005. Portugal hosted the finals.

Then followed the switch to odd years. The change was made because the senior teams of many nations often chose to promote players from their under-21s team as their own qualification campaign intensified. Staggering the tournaments allowed players more time to develop in the under-21 team rather than get promoted too early and end up becoming reserves for the seniors.

The 2007 competition actually began before the 2006 finals, with a qualification round to eliminate eight of the lowest-ranked nations. For the first time, the host (Netherlands) was chosen ahead of the qualification section. As hosts, Netherlands qualified automatically. Coincidentally, the Dutch team had won the 2006 competition – the holders would normally have gone through the qualification stage. The other nations were all drawn into fourteen three-team groups. The 14 group winners were paired in double-leg play-off to decide the seven qualifiers alongside the hosts.

From 2009 to 2015, ten qualification groups were used, with the group winners and four best runners-up going into the two-legged play-offs.

The 2015 finals was to be the last eight teams edition, as UEFA expanded the tournament to twelve teams starting from the 2017 edition.

On 6 February 2019, UEFA's Executive Committee increased the number of participants in the finals to sixteen teams, starting from the 2021 edition.

== Results ==
Ed.	Year	Hosts	Final			Losing semi-finalists (or third place match)			No. of teams
Ed.	Year	Hosts	Winners	Score	Runners-up	Losing semi-finalists (or third place match)			No. of teams
1	1978	Home-and-away basis	Yugoslavia	1–0 / 4–4; 5–4 on aggregate	East Germany	Bulgaria and England			8
2	1980	Home-and-away basis	Soviet Union	0–0 / 1–0; 1–0 on aggregate	East Germany	England and Yugoslavia			8
3	1982	Home-and-away basis	England	3–1 / 2–3; 5–4 on aggregate	West Germany	Scotland and Soviet Union			8
4	1984	Home-and-away basis	England	1–0 / 2–0; 3–0 on aggregate	Spain	Italy and Yugoslavia			8
5	1986	Home-and-away basis	Spain	1–2 / 2–1; 3–3 on aggregate (3–0 p)	Italy	England and Hungary			8
6	1988	Home-and-away basis	France	0–0 / 3–0; 3–0 on aggregate	Greece	England and Netherlands			8
7	1990	Home-and-away basis	Soviet Union	4–2 / 3–1; 7–3 on aggregate	Yugoslavia	Italy and Sweden			8
8	1992	Home-and-away basis	Italy	2–0 / 0–1; 2–1 on aggregate	Sweden	Denmark and Scotland			8
9	1994	France	Italy	1–0 (a.e.t.)	Portugal	Spain	2–1	France	8
10	1996	Spain	Italy	1–1 (4–2 p)	Spain	France	1–0	Scotland	8
11	1998	Romania	Spain	1–0	Greece	Norway	2–0	Netherlands	8
12	2000	Slovakia	Italy	2–1	Czech Republic	Spain	1–0	Slovakia	8
13	2002	Switzerland	Czech Republic	0–0 (3–1 p)	France	Italy and Switzerland			8
14	2004	Germany	Italy	3–0	Serbia and Montenegro	Portugal	3–2 (a.e.t.)	Sweden	8
15	2006	Portugal	Netherlands	3–0	Ukraine	France and Serbia and Montenegro			8
16	2007	Netherlands	Netherlands	4–1	Serbia	Belgium and England			8
17	2009	Sweden	Germany	4–0	England	Italy and Sweden			8
18	2011	Denmark	Spain	2–0	Switzerland	Belarus	1–0	Czech Republic	8
19	2013	Israel	Spain	4–2	Italy	Netherlands and Norway			8
20	2015	Czech Republic	Sweden	0–0 (4–3 p)	Portugal	Denmark and Germany			8
21	2017	Poland	Germany	1–0	Spain	England and Italy			12
22	2019	Italy; San Marino	Spain	2–1	Germany	France and Romania			12
23	2021	Hungary; Slovenia	Germany	1–0	Portugal	Netherlands and Spain			16
24	2023	Georgia; Romania	England	1–0	Spain	Israel and Ukraine			16
25	2025	Slovakia	England	3–2 (a.e.t.)	Germany	France and Netherlands			16
26	2027	Albania; Serbia							16

== Performances by countries ==
Team	Winners	Runners-up	Third place
Spain	5 (1986, 1998, 2011, 2013, 2019)	4 (1984, 1996, 2017, 2023)	2 (1994, 2000)
Italy	5 (1992, 1994, 1996, 2000, 2004)	2 (1986, 2013)	
England	4 (1982, 1984, 2023, 2025)	1 (2009)	
Germany (Note: Includes West Germany)	3 (2009, 2017, 2021)	3 (1982, 2019, 2025)	
Soviet Union	2 (1980, 1990)		
Netherlands	2 (2006, 2007)		
Serbia (Note: Includes Yugoslavia and Serbia and Montenegro)	1 (1978)	3 (1990, 2004, 2007)	
France	1 (1988)	1 (2002)	1 (1996)
Czech Republic	1 (2002)	1 (2000)	
Sweden	1 (2015)	1 (1992)	
Portugal		3 (1994, 2015, 2021)	1 (2004)
East Germany		2 (1978, 1980)	
Greece		2 (1988, 1998)	
Ukraine		1 (2006)	
Switzerland		1 (2011)	
Norway			1 (1998)
Belarus			1 (2011)

== Comprehensive team results by tournament ==
Legend

- 1st – Champions
- 2nd – Runners-up
- 3rd – Third place
- 4th – Fourth place
- SF – Semi-finalists
- QF – Quarter-finals
- GS – Group stage
- q – Qualified for the next tournament
- – Hosts
- • – Did not qualify
- × – Did not enter
- × – Withdrew before qualification / banned

Teams	1978	1980	1982	1984	1986	1988	1990	1992	1994	1996	1998	2000	2002	2004	2006	2007	2009	2011	2013	2015	2017	2019	2021	2023	2025	2027	Total
Albania	×	×	×	QF	•	•	•	•	•	×	•	•	•	•	•	•	•	•	•	•	•	•	•	•	•	q	2
Austria	•	×	•	•	•	•	•	•	•	•	•	•	•	•	•	•	•	•	•	•	•	GS	•	•	•	•	1
Belarus	Part of USSR								×	•	•	•	•	GS	•	•	GS	3rd	•	•	•	•	•	•	•	•	3
Belgium	•	•	•	•	•	•	•	•	•	•	•	•	GS	•	•	SF	•	•	•	•	•	GS	•	GS	•	q	5
Bulgaria	SF	•	•	•	•	•	QF	•	•	•	•	•	•	•	•	•	•	•	•	•	•	•	•	•	•	•	2
Croatia	Part of Yugoslavia							×	×	•	•	GS	•	GS	•	•	•	•	•	•	•	GS	QF	GS	•	q	6
Czech Republic^{1}	QF	QF	•	•	•	QF	QF	QF	QF	QF	•	2nd	1st	•	•	GS	•	4th	•	GS	GS	•	GS	GS	GS	q	17
Denmark	QF	•	•	•	QF	•	•	SF	•	•	•	•	•	•	GS	•	•	GS	•	SF	GS	GS	QF	•	QF	•	10
East Germany	2nd	2nd	•	•	•	•	•	Part of Germany																			2
England	SF	SF	1st	1st	SF	SF	•	•	•	•	•	GS	GS	•	•	SF	2nd	GS	GS	GS	SF	GS	GS	1st	1st	q	19
Finland	•	•	•	•	•	•	•	•	•	•	•	•	•	•	•	•	GS	•	•	•	•	•	•	•	GS	q	3
France	•	•	QF	QF	QF	1st	•	•	4th	3rd	•	•	2nd	•	SF	•	•	•	•	•	•	SF	QF	QF	SF	q	13
Georgia	Part of USSR							×	×	•	•	•	•	•	•	•	•	•	•	•	•	•	•	QF	GS	•	2
Germany^{2}	×	×	2nd	•	•	•	QF	QF	•	QF	QF	•	•	GS	GS	•	1st	•	GS	SF	1st	2nd	1st	GS	2nd	q	16
Greece	•	•	•	•	•	2nd	•	•	QF	•	2nd	•	GS	•	•	•	•	•	•	•	•	•	•	•	•	q	5
Hungary	QF	QF	•	•	SF	•	•	•	•	QF	•	•	•	•	•	•	•	•	•	•	•	•	GS	•	•	•	5
Iceland	×	×	×	•	•	•	•	•	•	•	•	•	•	•	•	•	•	GS	•	•	•	•	GS	•	•	•	2
Israel	Not a UEFA member								•	•	•	•	•	•	•	GS	•	•	GS	•	•	•	•	SF	•	•	3
Italy	QF	QF	QF	SF	2nd	QF	SF	1st	1st	1st	•	1st	SF	1st	GS	GS	SF	•	2nd	GS	SF	GS	QF	GS	QF	q	24
Netherlands	×	•	•	•	•	SF	•	QF	•	•	4th	GS	•	•	1st	1st	•	•	SF	•	•	•	SF	GS	SF	q	11
North Macedonia	Part of Yugoslavia							×	×	•	•	•	•	•	•	•	•	•	•	•	GS	•	•	•	•	•	1
Norway	•	•	•	•	•	•	•	•	•	•	3rd	•	•	•	•	•	•	•	SF	•	•	•	•	GS	•	q	4
Poland	•	•	QF	QF	QF	•	•	QF	QF	•	•	•	•	•	•	•	•	•	•	•	GS	GS	•	•	GS	q	9
Portugal	•	•	×	•	•	•	•	•	2nd	QF	•	•	GS	3rd	GS	GS	•	•	•	2nd	GS	•	2nd	QF	QF	q	12
Romania	•	•	•	•	•	•	•	•	•	•	QF	•	•	•	•	•	•	•	•	•	•	SF	GS	GS	GS	•	5
Russia	Part of USSR								QF	•	QF	•	•	•	•	•	•	•	GS	•	•	•	GS	×	×	×	4
Scotland	•	QF	SF	QF	•	QF	•	SF	•	4th	•	•	•	•	•	•	•	•	•	•	•	•	•	•	•	•	6
Serbia^{3}	1st	SF	•	SF	•	•	2nd	•	×	×	•	•	•	2nd	SF	2nd	GS	•	•	GS	GS	GS	•	•	•	q	12
Slovakia	Part of Czechoslovakia									•	•	4th	•	•	•	•	•	•	•	•	GS	•	•	•	GS	•	3
Slovenia	Part of Yugoslavia							×	×	•	•	•	•	•	•	•	•	•	•	•	•	•	GS	•	GS	•	2
Soviet Union	•	1st	SF	•	•	•	1st	•	Soviet Union was dissolved																		3
Spain	•	•	QF	2nd	1st	QF	QF	•	3rd	2nd	1st	3rd	•	•	•	•	GS	1st	1st	•	2nd	1st	SF	2nd	QF	q	18
Sweden	•	•	•	•	QF	•	SF	2nd	•	•	QF	•	•	4th	•	•	SF	•	•	1st	GS	•	•	•	•	•	8
Switzerland	•	•	•	•	•	•	•	•	•	•	•	•	SF	GS	•	•	•	2nd	•	•	•	•	GS	QF	•	•	5
Turkey	•	•	•	•	•	•	•	•	•	•	•	GS	•	•	•	•	•	•	•	•	•	•	•	•	•	•	1
Ukraine	Part of USSR								×	•	•	•	•	•	2nd	•	•	GS	•	•	•	•	•	SF	GS	•	4
Total	8	8	8	8	8	8	8	8	8	8	8	8	8	8	8	8	8	8	8	8	12	12	16	16	16	16	

Notes

- ^{1} Includes results representing Czechoslovakia
- ^{2} Includes results representing West Germany
- ^{3} Includes results representing Yugoslavia and Serbia and Montenegro

== Awards ==
=== Player of the Tournament ===
The Player of the Tournament award, formerly known as the Golden Player, is awarded to the player who plays the most outstanding football during the tournament. Since 2013, an official Player of the Tournament has been selected by the UEFA Technical Team.

Year	Golden Player	Ref.
1978	(Socialist Federal Republic of Yugoslavia) Vahid Halilhodžić	
1980	(Soviet Union) Anatoliy Demyanenko	
1982	(West Germany) Rudi Völler	
1984	(England) Mark Hateley	
1986	(Spain) Manolo Sanchís	
1988	(France) Laurent Blanc	
1990	(Socialist Federal Republic of Yugoslavia) Davor Šuker	
1992	(Italy) Renato Buso	
1994	(Portugal) Luís Figo	
1996	(Italy) Fabio Cannavaro	
1998	(Spain) Francesc Arnau	
2000	(Italy) Andrea Pirlo	
2002	(Czech Republic) Petr Čech	
2004	(Italy) Alberto Gilardino	
2006	(Netherlands) Klaas-Jan Huntelaar	
2007	(Netherlands) Royston Drenthe	
2009	(Sweden) Marcus Berg	
2011	(Spain) Juan Mata	
2013	(Spain) Thiago	
2015	(Portugal) William Carvalho	
2017	(Spain) Dani Ceballos	
2019	(Spain) Fabián Ruiz	
2021	(Portugal) Fábio Vieira	
2023	(England) Anthony Gordon	
2025	(England) Harvey Elliott	

=== Top Scorer ===
The UEFA European Under-21 Championship Top Scorer award, formerly known as the Golden Boot, is handed to the player who scores the most goals during the tournament. Since the 2013 tournament, those who finish as runners-up in the vote receive the Silver Boot and Bronze Boot awards as the second and third top goalscorers in the tournament, respectively.

Year	First place	Goals	Second place	Goals	Third place	Goals	Ref.
2000	(Italy) Andrea Pirlo	3					
2002	(Italy) Massimo Maccarone	3					
2004	(Italy) Alberto Gilardino	4					
2006	(Netherlands) Klaas-Jan Huntelaar	4					
2007	(Netherlands) Maceo Rigters	4					
2009	(Sweden) Marcus Berg	7					
2011	(Spain) Adrián	5					
2013	(Spain) Álvaro Morata	4	(Spain) Thiago	3	(Spain) Isco	3	
2015	(Czech Republic) Jan Kliment	3	(Germany) Kevin Volland	2	(Sweden) John Guidetti	2	
2017	(Spain) Saúl	5	(Spain) Marco Asensio	3	(Portugal) Bruma	3	
2019	(Germany) Luca Waldschmidt	7	(Romania) George Pușcaș	4	(Germany) Marco Richter	3	
2021	(Germany) Lukas Nmecha	4	(Italy) Patrick Cutrone	3	(Portugal) Dany Mota	3	
2023	(Spain) Sergio Gómez (Spain) Abel Ruiz (Ukraine) Heorhiy Sudakov	3					
2025	(Germany) Nick Woltemade	6					

=== Euro Under-21 dream team ===
On 17 June 2015, UEFA revealed an all-time best XI from the previous Under-21 final tournaments.

Goalkeeper	Defenders	Midfielders	Forwards
(Germany) Manuel Neuer	(Serbia) Branislav Ivanović (Germany) Mats Hummels (Italy) Alessandro Nesta (Italy) Giorgio Chiellini	(England) Frank Lampard (Italy) Andrea Pirlo (Spain) Xavi (Germany) Mesut Özil	(Italy) Francesco Totti (Spain) Raúl

== See also ==
- UEFA European Championship
- UEFA European Under-19 Championship
- UEFA European Under-17 Championship
