= 1982 UEFA European Under-21 Championship =

Tournament details
- Dates: 23 February – 24 May
- Teams: 27 (from 1 confederation)

Final positions
- Champions: England (1st title)
- Runners-up: West Germany

Tournament statistics
- Matches played: 74
- Goals scored: 194 (2.62 per match)
- Top scorer: (West Germany) Pierre Littbarski (6 goals)
- Best player: (West Germany) Rudi Völler

The 1982 UEFA European Under-21 Championship was the 3rd staging of the UEFA European Under-21 Championship. The qualifying stage spanned two years (1980–82) and had 26 entrants. West Germany competed in the competition for the first time. England U-21s won the competition.

The 26 national teams were divided into eight groups (six groups of 3 + two groups of 4). The group winners played off against each other on a two-legged home-and-away basis until the winner was decided. There was no 3rd-place playoff.

== Qualifying stage ==
=== Draw ===
The allocation of teams into qualifying groups was based on that of 1982 FIFA World Cup qualification with several changes, reflecting the absence of some nations:

- Group 1 did not include Albania
- Group 2 did not include Netherlands (moved to Group 8) and Republic of Ireland
- Group 3 did not include Wales and Iceland
- Group 4 did not include Norway (moved to Group 7)
- Group 5 did not include Denmark (moved to Group 6) and Luxembourg (moved to Group 8)
- Group 6 did not include Portugal, Northern Ireland and Israel, but included Denmark (moved from Group 5)
- Group 7 did not include Malta, but included Norway (moved from Group 4)
- Group 8 composed of Netherlands (moved from Group 2), Luxembourg (moved from Group 5) and Spain (who did not participate in World Cup qualification)

Qualifying Group 1
Standing	Country	P	W	D	L	F	A	Pts
**1**	**West Germany**	6	5	0	1	15	5	10
**2**	Bulgaria	6	5	0	1	7	5	10
**3**	Austria	6	1	1	4	3	9	3
**4**	Finland	6	0	1	5	4	10	1

- Finland 0–1 Bulgaria
- Finland 1–2 Austria
- Bulgaria 1–0 W. Germany
- W. Germany 4–0 Austria
- Bulgaria 1–0 Finland
- Finland 1–2 W. Germany
- Austria 1–2 Bulgaria
- Austria 0–0 Finland
- W. Germany 4–2 Finland
- Austria 0–1 W. Germany
- Bulgaria 1–0 Austria
- W.Germany 4–1 Bulgaria

Qualifying Group 2
Standing	Country	P	W	D	L	F	A	Pts
**1**	**France**	4	3	0	1	7	4	6
**2**	Belgium	4	2	0	2	4	4	4
**3**	Cyprus	4	1	0	3	4	7	2

- France 3–1 Cyprus
- Belgium 2–1 Cyprus
- Cyprus 0–1 Belgium
- France 1–0 Belgium
- Belgium 1–2 France
- Cyprus 2–1 France

Qualifying Group 3
Standing	Country	P	W	D	L	F	A	Pts
**1**	**Soviet Union**	4	1	3	0	1	0	5
**2**	Czechoslovakia	4	1	2	1	4	2	4
**3**	Turkey	4	1	1	2	2	5	3

- Czechoslo. 3–0 Turkey
- Turkey 2–1 Czechoslo.
- USSR 1–0 Turkey
- Turkey 0–0 USSR
- USSR 0–0 Czecho.
- Czechoslo. 0–0 USSR

Qualifying Group 4
Standing	Country	P	W	D	L	F	A	Pts
**1**	**England**	6	4	1	1	12	5	9
**2**	Hungary	6	3	0	3	12	9	6
**3**	Romania	6	2	1	3	9	12	5
**4**	Switzerland	6	1	2	3	5	12	4

- Romania 4–0 England
- England 5–0 Switzerland
- England 3–0 Romania
- Switzerland 0–1 Hungary
- Hungary 4–2 Romania
- Switzerland 0–0 England
- Hungary 1–2 England
- Romania 2–1 Hungary
- Romania 1–1 Switz.
- Hungary 5–1 Switzerland
- Switz. 3–0 Romania
- England 2–0 Hungary

Qualifying Group 5
Standing	Country	P	W	D	L	F	A	Pts
**1**	**Italy**	4	3	0	1	5	2	6
**2**	Yugoslavia	4	2	1	1	4	2	5
**3**	Greece	4	0	1	3	2	7	1

- Italy 1–0 Yugoslavia
- Greece 1–3 Italy
- Yugoslavia 1–1 Greece
- Yugoslavia 1–0 Italy
- Italy 1–0 Greece
- Greece 0–2 Yugoslavia

Qualifying Group 6
Standing	Country	P	W	D	L	F	A	Pts
**1**	**Scotland**	4	2	1	1	7	4	5
**2**	Denmark	4	1	2	1	4	4	4
**3**	Sweden	4	1	1	2	3	6	3

- Sweden 2–0 Scotland
- Denmark 2–1 Sweden
- Scotland 2–1 Denmark
- Sweden 0–0 Denmark
- Scotland 4–0 Sweden
- Denmark 1–1 Scotland

Qualifying Group 7
Standing	Country	P	W	D	L	F	A	Pts
**1**	**Poland**	4	4	0	0	11	3	8
**2**	Norway	4	1	1	2	5	6	3
**3**	East Germany	4	0	1	3	4	11	1

- Norway 0–1 Poland
- E. Germany 0–4 Norway
- E. Germany 2–3 Poland
- Norway 1–1 E. Germany
- Poland 3–1 E. Germany
- Poland 4–0 Norway

Qualifying Group 8
Standing	Country	P	W	D	L	F	A	Pts
**1**	**Spain**	4	4	0	0	13	3	8
**2**	Netherlands	4	2	0	2	4	4	4
**3**	Luxembourg	4	0	0	4	2	12	0

- Netherlands 0–2 Spain
- Spain 4–1 Luxembourg
- Netherlands 1–0 Luxem.
- Luxembourg 1–5 Spain
- Luxem. 0–2 Netherlands
- Spain 2–1 Netherlands

=== Qualified teams ===
Country	Qualified as	Previous appearances in tournament^{1}
West Germany	Group 1 winner	0 (Debut)
France	Group 2 winner	0 (Debut)
Soviet Union	Group 3 winner	1 (**1980**)
England	Group 4 winner	2 (1978, 1980)
Italy	Group 5 winner	2 (1978, 1980)
Scotland	Group 6 winner	1 (1980)
Poland	Group 7 winner	0 (Debut)
Spain	Group 8 winner	0 (Debut)

^{1} Bold indicates champion for that year

== Knockout stages ==
Quarter-finals
Italy	0	0	0
Scotland	1	0	1
Poland	1	2	3
England	2	2	4
France	0	2	2
Soviet Union	0	4	4
Spain	1	0	1
West Germany	0	2	2

Semi-finals
Scotland	0	1	1
England	1	1	2
Soviet Union	3	0	3
West Germany	4	5	9

Finals
England	3	2	5
West Germany	1	3	4
