= Soviet Union national under-23 football team =

Soviet Union national under-23 football team may refer to:

- Soviet Union national under-21 football team, which replaced the U-23 team in 1978
- Soviet Union Olympic football team, which competes in the Olympic football tournament, an under-23 competition
