= Vladimir Radionov =

Russian footballer, coach, and official

Personal information
- Full name: Vladimir Veniaminovich Radionov
- Date of birth: 21 July 1938 (age 88)
- Place of birth: Nizhnyaya Tavda, Tyumen Oblast, Russian SFSR
- Height: 1.80 m (5 ft 11 in)
- Position: Defender

Senior career*
Years	Team	Apps	(Gls)
1958–1959	FC Kalev Ülemiste		
1960–1961	FC Kalev Tallinn	49	(6)
1962–1966	FC Volga Kalinin		
1966–1969	FC Lokomotiv Moscow	89	(1)
1969	SC Tavriya Simferopol	7	(0)

Managerial career
- 1970–1975: FC Lokomotiv Moscow (academy)
- 1980–1981: FC Volga Kalinin
- 1982: FShM Moscow (assistant)
- 1983: FC Lokomotiv Moscow
- 1986–1990: Soviet Union U21
- * Club domestic league appearances and goals

Vladimir Veniaminovich Radionov (Russian: Владимир Вениаминович Радионов; born 21 July 1938) is a Russian former football player, coach and official.

He served as a General Secretary of the Russian Football Union from 1992 to 2004 and also was a member of the FIFA technical committee and a member of the UEFA European Championship organizing committee.
