= Leonid Pakhomov =

Russian footballer and manager (born 1943)

Personal information
- Full name: Leonid Aleksandrovich Pakhomov
- Date of birth: 17 February 1943 (age 83)
- Place of birth: Baku, Azerbaijani SSR, Soviet Union
- Height: 1.87 m (6 ft 1 1/2 in)
- Position: Defender

Youth career
- FC Neftyanik Baku

Senior career*
Years	Team	Apps	(Gls)
1963	FC Urozhay Maykop		
1964–1966	FC Kuban Krasnodar	69	(2)
1967–1976	FC Torpedo Moscow	261	(2)

Managerial career
- 1977: FC Torpedo Moscow (youth)
- 1979–1981: FC Torpedo Moscow (youth)
- 1982–1984: FC Kuban Krasnodar (assistant)
- 1985–1987: FC Torpedo Moscow (youth)
- 1988–1990: USSR Under-21 (assistant)
- 1991: USSR Olympic (assistant)
- 1992–1996: Russia Olympic (assistant)
- 1995: Russia Under-19
- 1996–1997: FC Kolos Krasnodar
- 1997–1998: Russia (assistant)
- 1998–1999: Russia Under-21
- 1999–2000: FC Torpedo-ZIL Moscow (assistant)
- 2001–2002: Shandong Luneng Taishan F.C. (assistant)
- 2002: FC Kolomna
- 2002–2004: Kazakhstan
- 2003–2004: FC Kairat
- * Club domestic league appearances and goals

Leonid Aleksandrovich Pakhomov (Russian: Леонид Александрович Пахомов; born 17 February 1943) is a Russian football manager and a former player.

== Honours ==
- Soviet Cup winner: 1968, 1972.
- Soviet Top League bronze: 1968.
- Top-33 year-end best players list: 1971 (No. 3)
