= Pagonis Vakalopoulos =

Greek footballer

Personal information
- Full name: Pagonis Vakalopoulos
- Date of birth: 24 January 1965 (age 61)
- Place of birth: Polykastro, Greece
- Position: Defender

Youth career
- –1983: Polykastro

Senior career*
Years	Team	Apps	(Gls)
1983–1984	Polykastro	53	(1)
1984–1995	Iraklis	163	(8)
1995–1996	Panionios	15	(1)
Total		231	(10)

International career
1986–1988	Greece U21	12	(0)
1987–1991	Greece	10	(1)

Managerial career
- 2010–2011: Iraklis (assistant)
- 2013–: Iraklis U20
- * Club domestic league appearances and goals

Pagonis Vakalopoulos (Greek: Παγώνης Βακαλόπουλος; born 24 January 1965) is a retired Greek footballer. He started his career in Polykastro, spent most of his career with Iraklis with which he won Balkans Cup and finished his playing career with Panionios. Currently he is the manager of Iraklis U20 team.

== Playing career ==
=== Career ===
He started his career in his home town club, Polykastro. In December 1984, he transferred to Iraklis, where he spent the biggest part of his career. While playing for Iraklis he won the Balkans Cup in 1985 and was a runner-up of the Greek Cup in 1987. In 1995, he moved to Panionios, where he retired from football after one season.

=== International career ===
Vakalopoulos was a member of the Greek U21 team, that reached the final of 1988 UEFA European Under-21 Football Championship. He earned 10 caps for the Greece national team and scored once. He debuted in a home defeat against Netherlands on 16 December 1987. Vakalopoulos scored his only goal at the international level in a friendly win against Norway. His last international appearance was against Sweden on 17 April 1991.

== Coaching career ==
On 30 July 2013 was hired as a manager for the under-20 team of Iraklis. He had previously worked as an assistant in Iraklis first team, under Marinos Ouzounidis.

== Honours ==
Iraklis

- Balkans Cup: 1985
