= Denmark national under-21 football team =

National under-21 association football team representing Denmark

Denmark Under-21
- Association: Danish Football Association (Dansk Boldspil-Union)
- Head coach: Lars Knudsen
- Most caps: Jonas Kamper (39)
- Top scorer: Marcus Ingvartsen (17)
- Home stadium: Vejle Stadium
First colours	Second colours

First international
- Norway 2–3 Denmark (Oslo, Norway; 13 June 1948)

Biggest win
- Denmark 9–0 Luxembourg (Farum, Denmark; 11 October 2002)

Biggest defeat
- Bulgaria 6–0 Denmark (Sofia, Bulgaria; 25 April 1989)

Olympic Games
- Appearances: 2 (first in 1992)
- Best result: Quarter-finals (2016)

UEFA U-21 Championship
- Appearances: 11 (first in 1972 (Note: This was during the under-23s era of the competition. Their first appearance in the competition during the under-21s era was in 1978.))
- Best result: Semi-finals (1992, 2015)

The Denmark national under-21 football team has played since 1976 and is controlled by the Danish Football Association. Before 1976, the age limit was 23 years.

== Competitive record ==
=== Summer Olympics ===
Gold medalists Silver medalists Bronze medalists

Summer Olympics										Qualification						
Year	Host	Round	Pld	W	D	L	F	A	Squad	Pos.	Pld	W	D	L	F	A
1900 to 1904		Only club teams participated								Only club teams participated						
1908 to 1988		See Denmark national football team								See Denmark national football team						
1992	Spain	Group stage	3	0	2	1	1	4	Squad	1st	8	5	3	0	27	5
1996	United States	Did not qualify								3rd	10	6	1	3	31	15
2000	Australia	Did not qualify								3rd	8	3	1	4	11	13
2004	Greece	Did not qualify								3rd	10	6	3	1	25	4
2008	China	Did not qualify								2nd	2	1	0	1	3	2
2012	United Kingdom	Did not qualify								4th	3	1	0	2	3	5
2016	Brazil	Quarter-finals	4	1	1	2	1	6	Squad	1st	16	10	4	2	43	18
2020	Japan	Did not qualify								2nd	13	9	2	2	36	12
2024	France	Did not qualify								2nd	10	6	2	2	15	9
2028	United States	Did not qualify								2nd	10	5	3	2	18	11
Total		Quarter-finals	7	1	3	3	2	10	—	2/10	90	52	19	19	212	94

=== UEFA European Under-21 Championship ===
Winners Runners-up

UEFA European Under-21 Championship										Qualification						
Year	Host	Round	Pld	W	D	L	F	A	Squad	Pos.	Pld	W	D	L	F	A
1972		Quarter-finals	2	1	0	1	2	5	Squad	1st	2	1	1	0	3	2
1974		Did not qualify								3rd	4	0	0	4	1	11
1976		Did not qualify								3rd	4	0	1	3	4	12
1978		Quarter-finals	2	1	0	1	4	4	Squad	1st	4	2	1	1	10	5
1980		Did not qualify								2nd	4	1	0	3	3	4
1982		Did not qualify								2nd	4	1	2	1	4	4
1984		Did not qualify								4th	6	1	1	4	6	16
1986		Quarter-finals	2	0	1	1	1	2	Squad	1st	6	3	2	1	11	7
1988		Did not qualify								2nd	6	2	2	2	7	6
1990		Did not qualify								3rd	6	2	1	3	9	14
1992		Semi-finals	4	1	1	2	6	4	Squad	1st	6	4	2	0	21	4
1994	France	Did not qualify								3rd	8	4	0	4	12	9
1996	Spain	Did not qualify								3rd	10	6	1	3	31	15
1998	Romania	Did not qualify								2nd	8	5	1	2	16	9
2000	Slovakia	Did not qualify								3rd	8	3	1	4	11	13
2002	Switzerland	Did not qualify								3rd	10	4	3	3	18	12
2004	Germany	Did not qualify								2nd	8	6	1	1	24	3
2006	Portugal	Group stage	3	0	2	1	5	6	Squad	1st	14	11	2	1	34	13
2007	Netherlands	Did not qualify								2nd	2	1	0	1	3	2
2009	Sweden	Did not qualify								2nd	10	5	1	4	13	6
2011	Denmark	Group stage	3	1	0	2	3	5	Squad	Qualified as hosts						
2013	Israel	Did not qualify								2nd	10	4	4	2	20	16
2015	Czech Republic	Semi-finals	4	2	0	2	5	8	Squad	1st	12	8	4	0	38	10
2017	Poland	Group stage	3	1	0	2	4	7	Squad	1st	10	9	1	0	24	3
2019	Italy	Group stage	3	2	0	1	6	4	Squad	1st	10	7	2	1	30	8
2021	Hungary; Slovenia	Quarter-finals	4	3	1	0	8	2	Squad	1st	10	8	2	0	21	9
2023	Georgia; Romania	Did not qualify								2nd	10	6	2	2	15	9
2025	Slovakia	Quarter-finals	4	2	1	1	9	8	Squad	1st	8	5	2	1	18	8
2027	Albania; Serbia	Did not qualify								2nd	10	5	3	2	18	11
Total		Semi-finals	34	14	6	14	53	53	—	11/29	210	114	43	53	425	241

- *Draws include knockout matches decided on penalty kicks.
- **Gold background colour indicates that the tournament was won.
- ***Red border color indicates tournament was held on home soil.

== UEFA European Under-21 Championship ==
=== 2027 UEFA European Under-21 Championship qualification ===
Pos	Team	Pld	W	D	L	GF	GA	GD	Pts	Qualification	Belgium	Denmark	Austria	Wales	Belarus
1	Belgium	8	5	2	1	13	2	+11	17	Final tournament	—	2–0	1–0	1–0	1–0
2	Denmark	8	4	3	1	15	6	+9	15	Play-offs	0–0	—	1–1	4–0	2–0
3	Austria	8	4	2	2	15	9	+6	14		1–0	1–1	—	0–2	2–1
4	Wales	8	2	0	6	7	28	−21	6		0–7	2–6	1–7	—	2–0
5	Belarus	8	1	1	6	7	12	−5	4		1–1	0–1	2–3	3–0	—

Source: UEFA
Legend: Blue = home team win; Yellow = draw; Red = away team win.
Rules for classification: Tiebreakers

== Recent results and forthcoming fixtures ==
=== Results in 2025 ===
Win Draw Lose Fixture

18 November 2025 2027 UEFA Euro - Qualification	Denmark	v	Belarus
		Report

== Players ==
=== Current squad ===
The following players were called up for the 2027 UEFA European Under-21 Championship qualification Group I match against Wales on 31 March 2026.

Caps and goals updated as of 31 March 2026, after the match against Wales.

No.	Pos.	Player	Date of birth (age)	Caps	Goals	Club
1	GK	Theo Sander	8 January 2005 (age 21)	7	0	(Danish Football Association) OB
16	GK	William Lykke	28 September 2004 (age 22)	3	0	(Swedish Football Association) Halmstad
	GK	Aske Andrésen	12 July 2005 (age 21)	0	0	(Danish Football Association) Silkeborg
3	DF	Sebastian Otoa	13 May 2004 (age 22)	4	0	(Italian Football Federation) Genoa
5	DF	Tobias Storm	4 July 2004 (age 22)	7	0	(Danish Football Association) Lyngby
13	DF	Marcus McCoy	24 August 2005 (age 21)	2	0	(Danish Football Association) Odense
15	DF	Gustav Mortensen	19 March 2004 (age 22)	5	0	(Royal Belgian Football Association) Standard Liège
21	DF	Lukas Kirkegaard	31 August 2005 (age 21)	1	0	(Danish Football Association) Viborg
23	DF	Julius Berthel Askou	27 May 2006 (age 20)	5	0	(Danish Football Association) Odense
	DF	Sabil Hansen	4 November 2005 (age 21)	6	0	(Danish Football Association) Randers
4	MF	William Clem	20 June 2004 (age 22)	17	0	(Danish Football Association) Copenhagen
6	MF	Oscar Højlund	4 January 2005 (age 21)	6	0	(German Football Association) Eintracht Frankfurt
7	MF	Silas Andersen	13 June 2004 (age 22)	7	2	(Portuguese Football Federation) Sporting
12	MF	Thomas Jørgensen	30 September 2005 (age 21)	11	2	(French Football Federation) Toulouse
14	MF	Kasper Davidsen	25 January 2005 (age 21)	3	0	(German Football Association) Holstein Kiel
18	MF	Max Ejdum	15 October 2004 (age 22)	4	0	(Danish Football Association) Odense
20	MF	Valdemar Byskov	25 January 2005 (age 21)	3	0	(Danish Football Association) Midtjylland
8	FW	Adam Daghim	28 September 2005 (age 21)	8	2	(German Football Association) VfL Wolfsburg
9	FW	Conrad Harder	7 April 2005 (age 21)	13	4	(German Football Association) RB Leipzig
10	FW	Clement Bischoff	16 December 2006 (age 19)	13	5	(Austrian Football Association) Red Bull Salzburg
11	FW	August Priske	23 March 2004 (age 22)	7	2	(The Football Association) Birminham City
19	FW	Sami Jalal	8 August 2004 (age 22)	0	0	(Danish Football Association) Viborg
	FW	Frederik Emmery	15 December 2006 (age 19)	2	0	(Danish Football Association) Aarhus GF
	FW	Charly Nouck	21 March 2004 (age 22)	0	0	(Danish Football Association) Viborg

=== Recent call-ups ===
The following players have also been called up to the squad recently and remain eligible for selection.

Pos.	Player	Date of birth (age)	Caps	Goals	Club	Latest call-up
GK	Anders Ravn	2 April 2005 (age 21)	0	0	(Denmark) Hvidovre	v. Belarus, 18 November 2025
DF	Villads Nielsen	29 January 2005 (age 21)	4	0	(Norway) Bodø/Glimt	v. Belarus, 18 November 2025
DF	Ludwig Vraa	23 June 2005 (age 21)	1	0	(Austria) Grazer AK	v. Belarus, 18 November 2025
DF	Hjalte Bidstrup	15 February 2006 (age 20)	1	0	(Denmark) Viborg	v. Belarus, 18 November 2025
MF	Noah Nartey	5 October 2005 (age 21)	10	0	(France) Lyon	v. Belarus, 18 November 2025
MF	Mads Enggård	20 January 2004 (age 22)	5	0	(Denmark) Vejle	v. Belarus, 18 November 2025
MF	Oscar Schwartau	17 May 2006 (age 20)	1	0	(England) Norwich City	v. Belarus, 18 November 2025
FW	Filip Bundgaard	3 July 2004 (age 22)	4	1	(Denmark) Brøndby	v. Belarus, 18 November 2025
FW	Jacob Ambæk	28 March 2008 (age 18)	1	0	(Denmark) Brøndby	v. Belarus, 18 November 2025

== Records ==
=== Most appearances ===
Because of the age restriction, a player can't be in the team for very long and the most promising young players spend little time with the under-21 team before making their senior national team debut.

Rank	Player	Club(s)	U-21 Caps	U-21 Goals	Year(s)
1	**Jonas Kamper**	Brøndby	39	3	2002–2006
2	Lasse Vigen Christensen	Fulham	38	5	2013–2017
3	**Martin Jørgensen**	AGF, Udinese	31	9	1994–1997
3	**Michael Jakobsen**	AaB	31	4	2005–2008
3	**Victor Nelsson**	Nordsjælland, Copenhagen	31	1	2017–2021
6	**Rasmus Würtz**	Skive, AaB	29	1	2002–2006
6	**Lucas Andersen**	Ajax, Willem II, Grasshopper	29	6	2012–2017
6	**Marcus Ingvartsen**	Nordsjælland, Genk	29	17	2015–2019
9	Martin Pedersen	AaB, SønderjyskE	28	0	2002–2006
9	**Jannik Vestergaard**	1899 Hoffenheim, Werder Bremen, Borussia Mönchengladbach	28	4	2011–2015

Note: Club(s) represents the permanent clubs during the player's time in the under-21 national team. Players in bold have played at least one game for the senior Danish national team.

=== Most goals ===
Rank	Player	Club(s)	U-21 Goals	U-21 Caps	Year(s)
1	**Marcus Ingvartsen**	Nordsjælland, Genk	17	29	2015–2019
2	**Peter Møller**	AaB	16	22	1990–1993
3	**Nicki Bille**	Reggina, Martina, Nordsjælland, Villarreal	15	24	2007–2011
4	Tommy Bechmann	Esbjerg	11	15	2002–2003
5	**Thomas Kahlenberg**	Brøndby, Auxerre	10	26	2002–2006
6	**Preben Elkjær**	Vanløse, 1. FC Köln, Lokeren	9	9	1976–1979
6	**Morten Rasmussen**	AGF	9	21	2004–2006
6	**Martin Jørgensen**	AGF, Udinese	9	31	1994–1997
9	**Bent Jensen**	B 1913	8	10	1966–1968
9	William Osula	Sheffield United, Derby County (loan), Newcastle United	8	14	2023–2025
9	**Per Frandsen**	B 1903, Lille	8	21	1989–1992
9	**Miklos Molnar**	Frem, Standard Liège, Lyngby	8	21	1989–1992

Note: Club(s) represents the permanent clubs represented in the games in which the player's scored for the under-21 national team. Players in bold have played at least one game for the senior Danish national team.

=== Managers ===
- 1959–1966 Ivan Jessen
- 1967–1967 Erik Dennung
- 1968–1969 Ejnar Olsen
- 1970–1970 Henry From
- 1971–1973 Kaj Christensen
- 1974–1974 Ejnar Olsen
- 1976–1980 Tommy Troelsen
- 1980–1989 Richard Møller Nielsen
- 1989–1992 Viggo Jensen
- 1992–1999 Jan B. Poulsen
- 2000–2006 Flemming Serritslev
- 2006–2011 Keld Bordinggaard
- 2011–2013 Morten Wieghorst
- 2013–2015 Jess Thorup
- 2015–2019 Niels Frederiksen
- 2019–2021 Albert Capellas
- 2021–2023 Jesper Sørensen
- 2023–2025 Steffen Højer
- 2025–present Lars Knudsen

== See also ==
- UEFA European Under-21 Championship 2006
- Denmark national football team
- Denmark national under-17 football team
- Denmark national under-19 football team
