= Scotland national under-21 football team =

National under-20 association football team representing Scotland

Scotland under-21
- Association: Scottish Football Association
- Head coach: Tony Docherty
- Most caps: Christian Dailly (35)
- Top scorer: Fraser Hornby (10)
| First colours | Second colours |

First international
- Czechoslovakia 0–0 Scotland (Plzeň, Czechoslovakia; 12 October 1976)

Biggest win
- Scotland 12–0 Gibraltar (Dundee, Scotland; 10 October 2025)

Biggest defeat
- England 6–0 Scotland (Sheffield, England; 13 August 2013)

UEFA U-21 Championship
- Appearances: 6 (first in 1980)
- Best result: Semi-finalists (1982, 1992, 1996)

The Scotland national under-21 football team, controlled by the Scottish Football Association, is Scotland's national under 21 football team and is considered to be a feeder team for the Scotland national football team.

As a European under-21 team, Scotland compete in the UEFA European Under-21 Championship, which is usually held every other year. The team has qualified for the final stages of these Championships on six occasions, although not since 1996. There is no global tournament for under-21 national teams. Performance in the European Championship determines qualification for football at the Summer Olympics, which Scotland is unable to compete in.

== History ==
Scotland played under-23 international matches, mainly friendlies against England and Wales, from 1955 until 1975. Scotland first entered the UEFA competition for under-23 national teams in 1975–76. Scotland reached the quarter-finals, but were eliminated on a penalty shootout by the Netherlands. An under-21 team then came into existence, replacing the under-23 team, when UEFA reduced the age limit.

Scotland under-21s have reached the last four of the European tournament three times (1982, 1992 and 1996), while appearing in the quarter-finals on three other occasions (1980, 1984 and 1988). The team qualified for the 1992 Summer Olympics and 1996 Summer Olympics, but were unable to compete due to Scotland not being independently represented in the International Olympic Committee. The under-21 team has not qualified for a finals tournament since the late 1990s. They reached the playoff round for the 2004 and 2011 tournaments, but lost to Croatia and Iceland respectively.

In 2018, an under-21 squad returned to the Toulon Tournament. Despite the loss to Turkey in a penalty-out for third-place. Scotland did receive the tournament Fair Play Award.

== Competitive record ==
Champions Runners-up Third place Fourth place Tournament held on home soil

=== UEFA European U-21 Championship Record ===
| UEFA European Under-21 Championship record | | | | | | | | Qualification record | | | | | |
| Year | Round | Pld | W | D | L | GF | GA | Pld | W | D | L | GF | GA |
|---|---|---|---|---|---|---|---|---|---|---|---|---|---|
| (Europe) 1976 (Note: Under-23 competition.) | Quarter-finals | 2 | 1 | 0 | 1 | 2 | 2 | 4 | 4 | 0 | 0 | 11 | 2 |
| (Europe) 1978 | Did not qualify | | | | | | | 4 | 2 | 1 | 1 | 5 | 4 |
| (Europe) 1980 | Quarter-finals | 2 | 0 | 1 | 1 | 1 | 2 | 5 | 3 | 2 | 0 | 13 | 5 |
| (Europe) 1982 | Semi-finals | 4 | 1 | 2 | 1 | 2 | 2 | 4 | 2 | 1 | 1 | 7 | 4 |
| (Europe) 1984 | Quarter-finals | 2 | 1 | 0 | 1 | 3 | 4 | 6 | 4 | 2 | 0 | 11 | 6 |
| (Europe) 1986 | Did not qualify | | | | | | | 4 | 1 | 1 | 2 | 1 | 4 |
| (Europe) 1988 | Quarter-finals | 2 | 0 | 0 | 2 | 0 | 2 | 4 | 3 | 1 | 0 | 7 | 2 |
| (Europe) 1990 | Did not qualify | | | | | | | 6 | 1 | 1 | 4 | 7 | 13 |
| (Europe) 1992 | Semi-finals | 4 | 1 | 2 | 1 | 5 | 5 | 6 | 5 | 0 | 1 | 13 | 5 |
| (France) 1994 | Did not qualify | | | | | | | 8 | 2 | 2 | 4 | 8 | 11 |
| (Spain) 1996 | Fourth place | 4 | 1 | 0 | 3 | 5 | 6 | 8 | 7 | 0 | 1 | 16 | 4 |
| (Romania) 1998 | Did not qualify | | | | | | | 10 | 2 | 1 | 7 | 10 | 20 |
| (Slovenia) 2000 | Did not qualify | | | | | | | 10 | 4 | 2 | 4 | 18 | 12 |
| (Switzerland) 2002 | Did not qualify | | | | | | | 6 | 2 | 2 | 2 | 6 | 6 |
| (Germany) 2004 | Did not qualify | | | | | | | 8 | 5 | 1 | 2 | 11 | 8 |
| (Portugal) 2006 | Did not qualify | | | | | | | 10 | 1 | 3 | 6 | 6 | 17 |
| (Netherlands) 2007 | Did not qualify | | | | | | | 2 | 0 | 0 | 2 | 1 | 4 |
| (Sweden) 2009 | Did not qualify | | | | | | | 8 | 5 | 1 | 2 | 17 | 6 |
| (Denmark) 2011 | Did not qualify | | | | | | | 10 | 5 | 2 | 3 | 18 | 11 |
| (Israel) 2013 | Did not qualify | | | | | | | 8 | 3 | 4 | 1 | 16 | 9 |
| (Czech Republic) 2015 | Did not qualify | | | | | | | 8 | 3 | 2 | 3 | 12 | 15 |
| (Poland) 2017 | Did not qualify | | | | | | | 10 | 2 | 2 | 6 | 8 | 17 |
| (Italy) (San Marino) 2019 | Did not qualify | | | | | | | 10 | 4 | 2 | 4 | 13 | 13 |
| (Hungary) (Slovenia) 2021 | Did not qualify | | | | | | | 10 | 5 | 3 | 2 | 16 | 5 |
| (Romania) (Georgia (country)) 2023 | Did not qualify | | | | | | | 8 | 1 | 4 | 3 | 6 | 10 |
| (Slovakia) 2025 | Did not qualify | | | | | | | 10 | 5 | 1 | 4 | 19 | 11 |
| (Albania) (Serbia) 2027 | Did not qualify | | | | | | | 10 | 5 | 2 | 3 | 25 | 12 |
| Total | Semi-finals | 20 | 5 | 5 | 15 | 18 | 23 | 197 | 86 | 43 | 68 | 301 | 236 |

*Denotes draws include knockout matches decided by a penalty shootout.

=== Other tournaments ===
| Year | Competition | Result | GP | W | D* | L | GS | GA | Ref |
|---|---|---|---|---|---|---|---|---|---|
| (France) 1977 | Toulon Tournament | 6th place | 4 | 1 | 1 | 2 | 6 | 7 | |
| (France) 1991 | Toulon Tournament | Group Stage | 3 | 2 | 1 | 0 | 5 | 3 | |
| (France) 1992 | Toulon Tournament | Group Stage | 3 | 0 | 0 | 3 | 0 | 7 | |
| (France) 1993 | Toulon Tournament | Semi-finals | 4 | 2 | 0 | 2 | 3 | 2 | |
| (France) 1994 | Toulon Tournament | Group Stage | 3 | 1 | 1 | 1 | 3 | 3 | |
| (France) 1995 | Toulon Tournament | Semi-finals | 4 | 2 | 0 | 2 | 4 | 7 | |
| (France) 1997 | Toulon Tournament | Group Stage | 4 | 0 | 3 | 1 | 2 | 4 | |
| (Scotland) 1999 | Three Nations Tournament | 1st place | 2 | 1 | 1 | 0 | 2 | 1 | |
| (Northern Ireland) 2000 | Three Nations Tournament | 1st place | 2 | 1 | 1 | 0 | 2 | 1 | |
| (France) 2018 | Toulon Tournament | 4th place | 5 | 2 | 2 | 1 | 5 | 5 | |

*Denotes draws include knockout matches decided by a penalty shootout.

== Head coaches ==
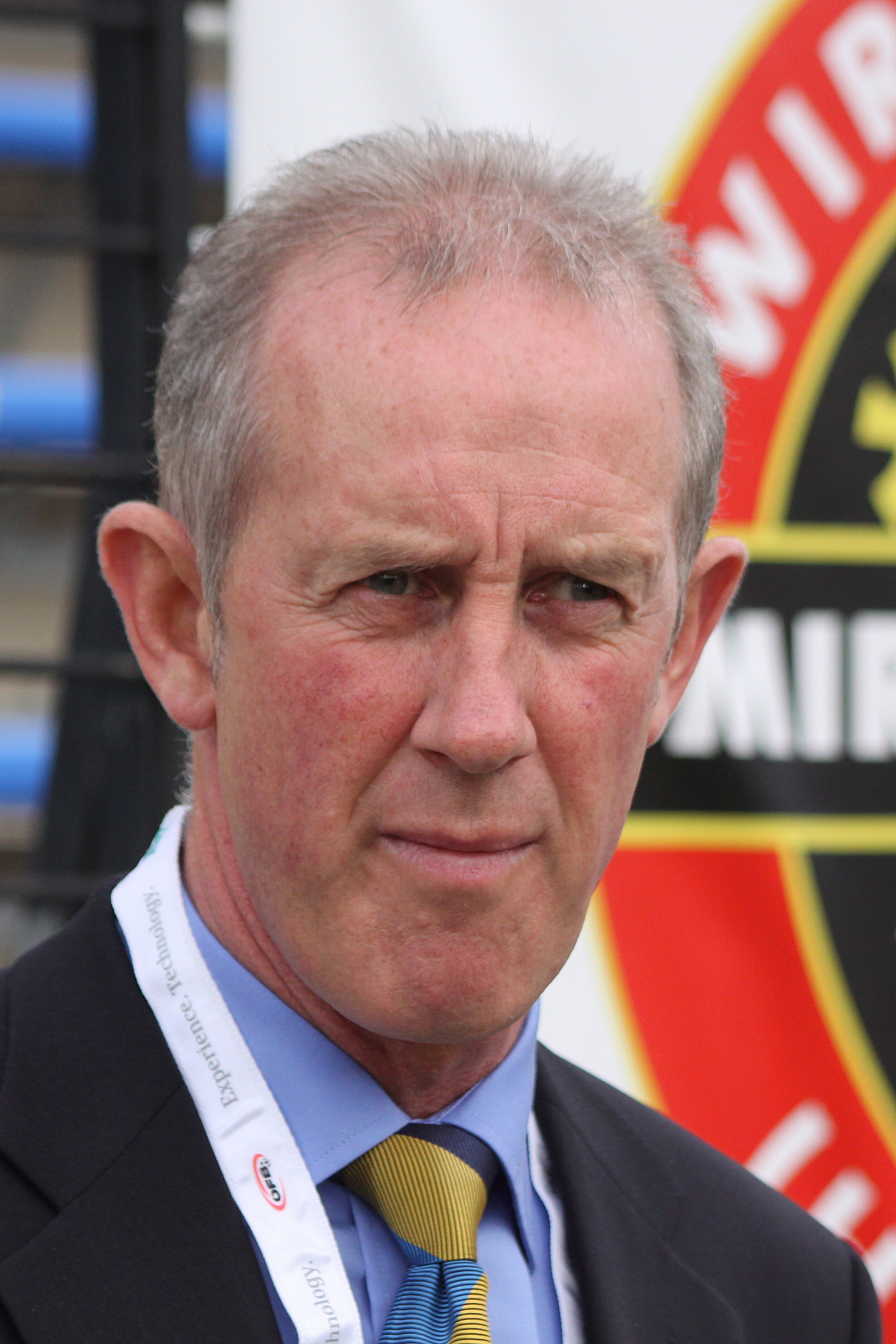
Billy Stark, head coach of the team from 2008 to 2014.

Archie Knox left his post as Scotland's National Youth Teams Coach on 30 August 2007 to take up a full-time with Bolton Wanderers as coaching co-ordinator, Maurice Malpas took temporary charge. In January 2008 the SFA appointed a new full-time coach in Billy Stark, who left his job as manager of Second Division side Queen's Park to take the position. Stark resigned from the position in November 2014.

| Tenure | Head coach/Manager |
|---|---|
| 1975–1982 | Andy Roxburgh |
| 1982–1986 | Walter Smith |
| 1986–1993 | Craig Brown |
| 1993–1998 | Tommy Craig |
| 1998–2002 | Alex Smith |
| 2002–2005 | Rainer Bonhof |
| 2005–2006 | Maurice Malpas (caretaker) |
| 2006–2007 | Archie Knox |
| 2007–2008 | Maurice Malpas (caretaker) |
| 2008–2014 | Billy Stark |
| 2014–2015 | Ricky Sbragia (caretaker) |
| 2015 | Danny Lennon (caretaker) |
| 2015–2016 | Ricky Sbragia |
| 2016–2026 | Scot Gemmill |
| 2026– | Tony Docherty |

== Players ==
=== Leading appearances ===
As of match played 30 September 2026

| Rank | Name | Years | Clubs | Appearances | Goals | GPG Ratio. |
|---|---|---|---|---|---|---|
| 1 | Christian Dailly | 1990–1996 | Dundee United | 35 | 5 | 0.14 |
| 2 | Steven Pressley | 1993–1996 | Rangers, Coventry City, Dundee United | 27 | 1 | 0.04 |
| 3 | Allan Campbell | 2017–2020 | Motherwell | 24 | 1 | 0.04 |
| 4 | Paul Hanlon | 2009–2012 | Hibernian | 23 | 3 | 0.13 |
| 5 | Craig Easton | 1997–2001 | Dundee United | 22 | 2 | 0.09 |
| 5 | Gary Naysmith | 1996–1999 | Heart of Midlothian | 22 | 0 | 0 |
| 5 | Glenn Middleton | 2018–2022 | Rangers | 22 | 5 | 0.23 |
| 8 | Shaun Maloney | 2001–2005 | Celtic | 21 | 5 | 0.24 |
| 8 | **Jeremiah Chilokoa-Mullen** | 2023–Present | Leeds United, Inverness Caledonian Thistle, Dunfermline Athletic, Wigan Athletic | 23 | 3 | 0.13 |
| 10 | Stuart Armstrong | 2010–2014 | Dundee United | 20 | 4 | 0.2 |
| 10 | Jamie McCunnie | 2001–2005 | Dundee United, Ross County, Dunfermline Athletic | 20 | 1 | 0.05 |
| 10 | Jordan McGhee | 2013–2017 | Heart of Midlothian | 20 | 0 | 0 |
| 10 | Ross McCrorie | 2016–2020 | Rangers, Portsmouth, Aberdeen | 20 | 1 | 0.05 |

Note: Club(s) represents the clubs the player was with while he played for the Scotland under-21 team. Those players in bold are eligible to play for the team now.

=== Leading goalscorers ===
As of match played 12 November 2026

| Rank | Name | Years | Clubs | Appearances | Goals | GPG Ratio. |
|---|---|---|---|---|---|---|
| 1 | Fraser Hornby | 2018–2020 | Everton, Kortrijk, Reims | 18 | 10 | 0.56 |
| 2 | Jordan Rhodes | 2011–2012 | Huddersfield Town | 8 | 8 | 1 |
| 2 | Scott Booth | 1990–1993 | Aberdeen | 15 | 8 | 0.53 |
| 4 | Chris Maguire | 2008–2010 | Aberdeen | 12 | 6 | 0.5 |
| 4 | Jamie Murphy | 2008–2010 | Motherwell | 13 | 6 | 0.46 |
| 4 | Jim Hamilton | 1995–1997 | Dundee, Heart of Midlothian | 14 | 6 | 0.43 |
| 4 | Mark Burchill | 1998–2001 | Celtic | 15 | 6 | 0.4 |
| 4 | **James Wilson** | 2025–Present | Heart of Midlothian, Tottenham Hotspur | 10 | 6 | 0.6 |
| 9 | Steven Fletcher | 2006–2008 | Hibernian | 7 | 5 | 0.71 |
| 9 | Tony Watt | 2012–2013 | Celtic | 9 | 5 | 0.56 |
| 9 | Gerry Creaney | 1990–1992 | Celtic | 12 | 5 | 0.42 |
| 9 | Steven Thompson | 1997–1999 | Dundee United | 12 | 5 | 0.42 |
| 9 | Simon Lynch | 2002–2003 | Celtic | 13 | 5 | 0.38 |
| 9 | Steven Naismith | 2005–2008 | Kilmarnock, Rangers | 16 | 5 | 0.31 |
| 9 | Shaun Maloney | 2001–2005 | Celtic | 21 | 5 | 0.24 |
| 9 | Christian Dailly | 1990–1996 | Dundee United | 35 | 5 | 0.14 |
| 9 | Glenn Middleton | 2018–2022 | Rangers | 22 | 5 | 0.23 |

Note: Club(s) represents the clubs the player was with while he played for the Scotland under-21 team. Those players in bold are eligible to play for the team now.

=== Eligibility ===
The team is for players born in the year 21 years before the starting year of each tournament. As each tournament normally takes two years to complete, players can continue to play for the under-21 team after their 22nd birthday. As long as they are eligible, players can play at any level, making it possible to play for the under-21s, senior side and then return to the under-21 side. It is now also possible to play for one country at youth level and another country at senior level (providing the player is eligible). For instance, Nigel Quashie played for England under-21s and Scotland. Until the late 1980s, teams were allowed to select some over-age players in the under-21 team, similar to the present arrangement in football at the Summer Olympics.

== Current squad ==
Players born on or after 1 January 2026 are eligible for selection.

The following players were selected for the friendly matches against Ukraine on 12 November and United States on 15 November 2026.

Caps and goals updated as of 12 November 2026, after the match against Ukraine. Clubs correct as of 11 August 2026.

| No. | Pos. | Player | Date of birth (age) | Caps | Goals | Club |
|---|---|---|---|---|---|---|
| 1 | GK | Rory Mahady | 16 August 2006 (age 20) | 2 | 0 | (The Football Association) Leeds United |
| 12 | GK | Aidan Rice | 5 May 2006 (age 20) | 1 | 0 | (Scottish Football Association) Dumbarton |
| 21 | GK | Sam Kane | 8 March 2006 (age 20) | 1 | 0 | (The Football Association) Derby County |
| 3 | DF | Mitchel Frame | 25 January 2006 (age 20) | 5 | 0 | (Scottish Football Association) Aberdeen |
| 5 | DF | Dylan Smith | 21 June 2006 (age 20) | 1 | 0 | (Scottish Football Association) Ross County |
| 6 | DF | Dan Armer | 22 October 2007 (age 19) | 1 | 0 | (The Football Association) Manchester United |
| 14 | DF | Sebastian Lochhead | | 1 | 0 | (The Football Association) Wolverhampton Wanderers |
| 15 | DF | Murray Campbell | 25 July 2006 (age 20) | 1 | 0 | (The Football Association) Burnley |
| 16 | DF | John Tod | 16 May 2007 (age 19) | 1 | 0 | (Scottish Football Association) Dunfermline Athletic |
| 18 | DF | Ethan Sutherland | 25 April 2006 (age 20) | 1 | 0 | (The Football Association) Exeter City |
| 20 | DF | Dylan Watret | 26 September 2006 (age 20) | 1 | 0 | (Scottish Football Association) Ayr United |
| 2 | MF | Calum MacLeod | 25 May 2006 (age 20) | 1 | 1 | (Scottish Football Association) Inverness Caledonian Thistle |
| 8 | MF | Tyler Fletcher | 19 March 2007 (age 19) | 4 | 1 | (The Football Association) Manchester United |
| 10 | MF | Lennon Miller | 25 August 2006 (age 20) | 6 | 3 | (Italian Football Federation) Udinese |
| 11 | MF | Kyle Ure | 14 January 2006 (age 20) | 7 | 1 | (The Football Association) Crewe Alexandra |
| 13 | MF | Findlay Marshall | 17 April 2006 (age 20) | 1 | 0 | (Scottish Football Association) Aberdeen |
| 17 | MF | Aidan Borland | 25 April 2007 (age 19) | 3 | 0 | (The Football Association) Accrington Stanley |
| 23 | MF | Alfie Stewart | 31 July 2006 (age 20) | 1 | 1 | (Scottish Football Association) Inverness Caledonian Thistle |
| 4 | FW | Josh Dede | 4 January 2006 (age 20) | 1 | 0 | (The Football Association) Middlesbrough |
| 7 | FW | Andy Tod | 26 February 2006 (age 20) | 6 | 0 | (Scottish Football Association) Dunfermline Athletic |
| 9 | FW | James Wilson | 6 March 2007 (age 19) | 10 | 6 | (Scottish Football Association) Heart of Midlothian |
| 19 | FW | Eseosa Sule | 1 April 2006 (age 20) | 1 | 0 | (Scottish Football Association) St Mirren |
| 22 | FW | Sam Chambers | 18 August 2007 (age 19) | 1 | 0 | (The Football Association) Northampton Town |

=== Recent call-ups ===
The following players have also been called up to the Scotland under-21 squad within the last twelve months and remain eligible (current clubs shown).

| Pos. | Player | Date of birth (age) | Caps | Goals | Club | Latest call-up |
|---|---|---|---|---|---|---|
| GK | Corey Shaw | 23 May 2008 (age 18) | 0 | 0 | (Scotland) Celtic | v. Bulgaria, 6 October 2026 |
| GK | Woody Williamson | 7 July 2006 (age 20) | 0 | 0 | (England) Ipswich Town | v. Portugal, 31 March 2026 |
| DF | Colby Donovan^{INJ} | 7 September 2006 (age 20) | 7 | 0 | (Scotland) Celtic | v. Ukraine, 12 November 2026 |
| DF | Sam Cleall-Harding | 26 March 2006 (age 20) | 9 | 1 | (Scotland) Dunfermline Athletic | v. Bulgaria, 6 October 2026 |
| MF | Calum Adamson^{INJ} | 7 August 2007 (age 19) | 0 | 0 | (Scotland) Raith Rovers | v. Ukraine, 12 November 2026 |
| MF | Findlay Curtis | 1 October 2006 (age 20) | 1 | 0 | (Scotland) Rangers | v. Bulgaria, 6 October 2026 |
| MF | Kyle Glasgow | 20 February 2010 (age 16) | 1 | 0 | (Scotland) Alloa Athletic | v. Bulgaria, 6 October 2026 |
| FW | Rory Wilson | 5 January 2006 (age 20) | 4 | 0 | (England) Aston Villa | v. Bulgaria, 6 October 2026 |
| FW | Ryan Oné | 26 June 2006 (age 20) | 11 | 1 | (England) Sheffield United | v. Portugal, 31 March 2026 |
^{INJ} Player withdrew from the squad for that game due to injury; ^{SNR} Player withdrew from the squad for that game after being promoted to the senior squad; ^{WTH} Player withdrew from the squad for that game for an unspecified reason

=== Past squads ===
- 1996 European Championship squad
