= Soviet Union national under-21 football team =

National U-21 association football team

Soviet Union U-21/23
1963–1991
- Nickname(s): Youth (Russian: Молодежная, romanized: Molodyozhnaya)
- Association: Football Federation of the Soviet Union
- Confederation: UEFA (Europe)
- Head coach: Boris Ignatyev (last; 1991–1992)
- FIFA code: URS
First colours	Second colours

First international
- Soviet Union (lads) 1–3 Soviet Union (youth) (Moscow, Soviet Union; 21 May 1963)

Last international
- Soviet Union 1–1 Italy (Simferopol, Ukrainian SSR; 16 October 1991)

Biggest win
- Soviet Union 6–0 Czechoslovakia (Yerevan, Armenian SSR; 10 April 1974)

Biggest defeat
- West Germany 5–0 Soviet Union (Aachen, West Germany; 30 March 1982)

UEFA U-21 Championship
- Appearances: 3 (first in 1980)
- Best result: Winners: 1976 (as U23); 1980 and 1990 (as U21)

The Soviet national youth football team was the under-21 football team of the Soviet Union. Before 1978 it was known as under-23 team. It ceased to exist on the breakup of the Union.

Following the realignment of UEFA's youth competitions in 1976, the Soviet Union Under-21 team was formed. The team had a good record, winning the competition twice, reaching the last four once, but failing to qualify for the last eight on five occasions.

After the dissolution of the Soviet Union (on 26 December 1991), the senior team played out its remaining fixtures, which were the finals of Euro 92. Because the Soviet Union U21s had, by 26 December, already failed to qualify for their version of the 1992 European Championship, the former Soviet states did not play as a combined team at under-21 level ever again.

Of the former Soviet states, only Russia entered the 1992–1994 competition. A total of 15 former Soviet states play international football today; 11 in Europe under UEFA, 4 in Asia under the AFC.

== UEFA U-23 championship record ==
Started in Balkans as the Under-23 Challenge Cup which ran from 1967 to 1970, the Soviet Union did not participate.

UEFA European Under-23 Championship Knockout stage									UEFA European Under-23 Championship Group stage					
Year	Round	Position	Pld	W	D	L	GF	GA	Pld	W	D	L	GF	GA
1972	Final	Runners-up	6	2	3	1	13	9	2	1	1	0	3	2
1974	Semifinals	Third place	4	2	0	2	9	4	4	3	1	0	8	1
1976	Final	Champions	6	3	1	2	9	6	2	1	0	1	4	2

== UEFA U-21 championship record ==
UEFA European Under-21 Championship Knockout stage									UEFA European Under-21 Championship Group stage					
Year	Round	Position	Pld	W	D	L	GF	GA	Pld	W	D	L	GF	GA
1978	did not qualify								4	2	1	1	5	1
1980	Final	Champions	6	4	2	0	8	1	4	3	1	0	8	2
1982	Semifinals	Third place	4	1	1	2	7	11	4	1	3	0	1	0
1984	did not qualify								6	2	3	1	8	6
1986	did not qualify								6	3	0	3	8	8
1988	did not qualify								6	3	0	3	7	9
1990	Final	Champions	6	4	2	0	13	6	6	4	1	1	12	5
1992	did not qualify								6	2	3	1	6	4

== Managers ==
- 1963 (Soviet Union) Boris Nabokov
- 1964 (Soviet Union) Boris Nabokov and (Soviet Union) Vasiliy Sokolov
- 1964 (Soviet Union) Vasiliy Sokolov
- 1965 (Soviet Union) Yevgeniy Goryanskiy
- 1965 (Soviet Union) Gavriil Kachalin
- 1966 (Soviet Union) Viktor Lakhonin and (Soviet Union) Yevgeniy Rogov
- 1966 (Soviet Union) Nikita Simonyan
- 1967 (Soviet Union) Boris Nabokov
- 1967 (Soviet Union) German Zonin
- 1967 (Soviet Union) Vsevolod Blinkov
- 1968 (Soviet Union) Gavriil Kachalin and (Soviet Union) Aleksei Paramonov
- 1968 (Soviet Union) Gavriil Kachalin
- 1968 (Soviet Union) Vitaliy Artemyev
- 1969–1973 (Soviet Union) Boris Nabokov
- 1974–1976 (Soviet Union) Valentin Nikolayev
- 1976 (Soviet Union) Sergei Mosiagin
- 1977–1979 (Soviet Union) Valentin Nikolayev
- 1980 (Soviet Union) Valentin Nikolayev and (Soviet Union) Sergei Korshunov
- 1980–1985 (Soviet Union) Valentin Nikolayev
- 1985 (Soviet Union) Vladimir Salkov
- 1985 (Soviet Union) Eduard Malofeyev
- 1986–1990 (Soviet Union) Vladimir Radionov
- 1988 (Soviet Union) Leonid Pakhomov
- 1991–1992 (Soviet Union) Boris Ignatyev

- In 1992 it also competed as the CIS national under-21 football team coached by Boris Ignatyev. Since August 1992 Boris Ignatyev continued already with the Russia national under-21 football team.

== 1990 European Championship squad ==
Head coach
Vladimir Radionov

No.	Pos.	Player	Date of birth (age)	Caps	Club
	GK	Andriy Kovtun	28 February 1968 (aged 21)	6	(Ukrainian Soviet Socialist Republic) Dynamo Kyiv
	GK	Dmitriy Kharine	16 August 1968 (aged 21)	10	(Russian Soviet Federative Socialist Republic) Dynamo Moscow
	GK	Mikhail Yeremin	17 June 1968 (aged 21)	2	(Russian Soviet Federative Socialist Republic) CSKA Moscow
	DF	Dmitriy Chugunov	9 June 1968 (aged 21)	6	(Russian Soviet Federative Socialist Republic) Torpedo Moscow
	DF	Andriy Bal	16 January 1958 (aged 31)	8	(Ukrainian Soviet Socialist Republic) Dynamo Kyiv
	DF	Vadim Rogovskoi	6 February 1962 (aged 27)	1	(Russian Soviet Federative Socialist Republic) Torpedo Moscow
	DF	Andriy Sydelnykov	27 September 1967 (aged 22)	6	(Ukrainian Soviet Socialist Republic) Dnipro Dnipropetrovsk
	DF	Andrei Chernyshov	7 January 1968 (aged 21)	5	(Russian Soviet Federative Socialist Republic) Dynamo Moscow
	DF	Oleh Luzhnyi	5 August 1968 (aged 21)	4	(Ukrainian Soviet Socialist Republic) SKA Karpaty Lviv / Dynamo Kyiv
	DF	Ravil Sabitov	8 March 1968 (aged 21)	4	(Russian Soviet Federative Socialist Republic) Dynamo Moscow
	DF	Serhiy Zayets	18 August 1969 (aged 20)	3	(Ukrainian Soviet Socialist Republic) Dynamo Kyiv
	DF	Boris Pozdnyakov	31 May 1962 (aged 27)	2	(Russian Soviet Federative Socialist Republic) Dynamo Moscow
	DF	Andrei Solovtsov	17 October 1967 (aged 22)	2	(Russian Soviet Federative Socialist Republic) Lokomotiv Moscow
	DF	Mikhail Solovyov	23 December 1968 (aged 21)	2	(Russian Soviet Federative Socialist Republic) CSKA Moscow / Torpedo Moscow
	DF	Gennadi Nagornykh	20 May 1968 (aged 21)	1	(Russian Soviet Federative Socialist Republic) Rostselmash Rostov
	DF	Gela Ketashvili	September 27, 1965 (aged 24)	1	(Georgian Soviet Socialist Republic) Dinamo Tbilisi
	DF	Kakhaber Tskhadadze	7 September 1968 (aged 21)	5	(Georgian Soviet Socialist Republic) Dinamo Tbilisi
	MF	Igor Shalimov	2 February 1969 (aged 20)	11	(Russian Soviet Federative Socialist Republic) Spartak Moscow
	MF	Serhiy Shmatovalenko	20 January 1967 (aged 22)	11	(Ukrainian Soviet Socialist Republic) Dynamo Kyiv
	MF	Andrei Kobelev	22 October 1968 (aged 21)	10	(Russian Soviet Federative Socialist Republic) Dynamo Moscow
	MF	Andrei Kanchelskis	23 January 1969 (aged 20)	8	(Ukrainian Soviet Socialist Republic) Dynamo Kyiv
	MF	Aleksandr Mostovoi	22 August 1968 (aged 21)	7	(Russian Soviet Federative Socialist Republic) Spartak Moscow
	MF	Andrei Pyatnitskiy	27 September 1967 (aged 22)	6	(Uzbek Soviet Socialist Republic) Pakhtakor Tashkent
	MF	Yevgeniy Smertin	17 January 1969 (aged 20)	4	(Russian Soviet Federative Socialist Republic) Dynamo Moscow
	MF	Igor Dobrovolskiy	27 August 1967 (aged 22)	2	(Russian Soviet Federative Socialist Republic) Dynamo Moscow
	MF	Zaza Revishvili	23 May 1968 (aged 21)	2	(Georgian Soviet Socialist Republic) Dinamo Tbilisi
	MF	Gia Dzhishkariani	30 November 1967 (aged 22)	1	(Georgian Soviet Socialist Republic) Dinamo Tbilisi
	MF	Serhiy Pohodin	29 April 1968 (aged 21)	1	(Ukrainian Soviet Socialist Republic) Dynamo Kyiv
	FW	Igor Kolyvanov	6 March 1968 (aged 21)	11	(Russian Soviet Federative Socialist Republic) Dynamo Moscow
	FW	Sergei Kiriakov	1 January 1970 (aged 19)	6	(Russian Soviet Federative Socialist Republic) Dynamo Moscow
	FW	Nikolai Pisarev	23 November 1968 (aged 21)	2	(Russian Soviet Federative Socialist Republic) Torpedo Moscow
	FW	Oleg Salenko	25 October 1969 (aged 20)	1	(Ukrainian Soviet Socialist Republic) Zenit Leningrad / Dynamo Kyiv
	FW	Sergei Yuran	11 June 1969 (aged 20)	1	(Russian Soviet Federative Socialist Republic) Dynamo Kyiv

Notes:

- All data through 31 December 1989.

== 1992 European Championship cycle squad ==
The last under-21 squad which is also known as the Olympic. All caps and goals are based on the Soviet team performance at the 1992 UEFA European Under-21 Championship in 1990–1991.

Head coach
Boris Ignatyev

No.	Pos.	Player	Date of birth (age)	Caps	Goals	Club
	GK	Gintaras Staučė	24 December 1969 (aged 22)	5	-2	(Russian SFSR Football Association) Spartak Moscow
	GK	Vladimir Pchelnikov	30 March 1970 (aged 21)	1	-2	(Russian SFSR Football Association) Torpedo Moscow
	DF	Serhiy Bezhenar	9 August 1970 (aged 21)	6	1	(Football Federation of the Ukrainian SSR) Dnipro Dnipropetrovsk
	DF	Yuriy Nikiforov	16 September 1970 (aged 21)	6	0	(Football Federation of the Ukrainian SSR) Chornomorets Odesa
	DF	Omari Tetradze	13 October 1969 (aged 22)	5	0	(Georgian SSR Football Association) Mertskhali Ozurgeti / Dynamo Moscow
	DF	Vyacheslav Tsaryov	4 May 1971 (aged 20)	3	0	(Russian SFSR Football Association) Dynamo Moscow
	DF	Dmitri Khlestov	21 January 1971 (aged 20)	3	0	(Russian SFSR Football Association) Spartak Moscow
	DF	Viktor Onopko	14 October 1969 (aged 22)	3	1	(Football Federation of the Ukrainian SSR) Shakhtar Donetsk
	DF	Oleh Benko	21 October 1969 (aged 22)	2	0	(Football Federation of the Ukrainian SSR) Dnipro Dnipropetrovsk
	DF	Serhiy Zayets	18 August 1969 (aged 22)	2	0	(Football Federation of the Ukrainian SSR) Dynamo Kyiv
	DF	Sergey Shustikov	30 September 1970 (aged 21)	2	1	(Russian SFSR Football Association) Torpedo Moscow
	DF	Yuriy Moroz	8 September 1970 (aged 21)	1	0	(Football Federation of the Ukrainian SSR) Dynamo Kyiv
	DF	Igor Chugainov	6 April 1970 (aged 21)	1	0	(Russian SFSR Football Association) Lokomotiv Moscow / Torpedo Moscow
	DF	Yevgeni Bushmanov	2 November 1971 (aged 20)	1	0	(Russian SFSR Football Association) Spartak Moscow
	DF	Sergei Mamchur	3 February 1972 (aged 19)	1	0	(Football Federation of the Ukrainian SSR) Dnipro Dnipropetrovsk
	MF	Serhiy Shcherbakov	15 August 1971 (aged 20)	3	1	(Football Federation of the Ukrainian SSR) Shakhtar Donetsk
	MF	Mirjalol Qosimov	17 September 1970 (aged 21)	3	0	(Uzbek SSR Football Association) Pakhtakor Tashkent
	MF	Bakhva Tedeyev	18 September 1969 (aged 22)	3	0	(Russian SFSR Football Association) Spartak Vladikavkaz
	MF	Sergei Mandreko	1 August 1971 (aged 20)	2	0	(Tajik SSR Football Association) Pamir Dushanbe
	MF	Anatoliy Mushchynka	19 August 1970 (aged 21)	1	0	(Football Federation of the Ukrainian SSR) Karpaty Lviv
	MF	Oleh Koshelyuk	7 September 1969 (aged 22)	1	0	(Football Federation of the Ukrainian SSR) SKA Odessa / Chornomorets Odesa
	FW	Dmitri Radchenko	2 December 1970 (aged 21)	6	1	(Russian SFSR Football Association) Zenit Leningrad / Spartak Moscow
	FW	Sergei Kiriakov	1 January 1970 (aged 21)	5	0	(Russian SFSR Football Association) Dynamo Moscow
	FW	Yuri Tishkov	12 March 1971 (aged 20)	4	1	(Russian SFSR Football Association) Torpedo Moscow
	FW	Oleg Salenko	25 October 1969 (aged 22)	3	0	(Football Federation of the Ukrainian SSR) Dynamo Kyiv
	FW	Valeri Popovitch	18 May 1970 (aged 21)	2	0	(Russian SFSR Football Association) Spartak Moscow
	FW	Igor Simutenkov	3 April 1973 (aged 18)	2	0	(Russian SFSR Football Association) Dynamo Moscow

== National teams of the former Soviet republics ==
Russia	National team	U-21 team	UEFA
Ukraine	National team	U-21 team	UEFA
Belarus	National team	U-21 team	UEFA
Uzbekistan	National team	U-23 team	AFC
Kazakhstan	National team	U-21 team (U-23 team)	UEFA (AFC: 1992–2002)
Georgia	National team	U-21 team	UEFA
Azerbaijan	National team	U-21 team	UEFA
Lithuania	National team	U-21 team	UEFA
Moldova	National team	U-21 team	UEFA
Latvia	National team	U-21 team	UEFA
Kyrgyzstan	National team	U-23 team	AFC
Tajikistan	National team	U-23 team	AFC
Armenia	National team	U-21 team	UEFA
Turkmenistan	National team	U-23 team	AFC
Estonia	National team	U-21 team	UEFA

== See also ==
- UEFA European Under-21 Championship
