= 1980 UEFA European Under-21 Championship =

Tournament details
- Dates: 12 February – 21 May
- Teams: 25 (from 1 confederation)

Final positions
- Champions: Soviet Union (1st title)
- Runners-up: East Germany

Tournament statistics
- Matches played: 67
- Goals scored: 154 (2.3 per match)
- Top scorer: (Soviet Union) Ramaz Shengelia (3 goals)
- Best player: (Soviet Union) Anatoliy Demyanenko

The 1980 UEFA European Under-21 Championship, which spanned two years (1978–80) had 25 entrants. Cyprus and the Netherlands competed in the competition for the first time. 1978 entrants Austria did not enter. Due to 'irregularities', Turkey's first two matches were awarded (3–0) to their opponents. USSR U-21s won the competition.

The 25 national teams were divided into eight groups (seven groups of 3 + one group of 4). The group winners played off against each other on a two-legged home-and-away basis until the winner was decided. There was no finals tournament or 3rd-place playoff.

== Qualifying stage ==
=== Draw ===
The allocation of teams into qualifying groups was based on that of UEFA Euro 1980 qualifying with several changes, reflecting the absence of some nations:

- Group 1 did not include Northern Ireland and Republic of Ireland
- Group 2 did not include Austria
- Group 3 did not include Romania (moved to Group 7)
- Group 4 did not include Switzerland (moved to Group 8) and Iceland
- Group 5 did not include Luxembourg (moved to Group 8)
- Group 6 did not include Hungary (moved to Group 7)
- Group 7 did not include West Germany, Wales and Malta, but included Romania (moved from Group 3) and Hungary (moved from Group 6)
- Group 8 composed of Switzerland (moved from Group 4), Luxembourg (moved from Group 5) and Italy (who did not participate in senior Euro qualification)

Qualifying Group 1		P	W	D	L	F	A	Pts
**1**	**England**	4	4	0	0	11	2	8
**2**	Denmark	4	1	0	3	3	4	2
**3**	Bulgaria	4	1	0	3	2	10	2

- Denmark 1–2 England
- Denmark 2–0 Bulgaria
- Bulgaria 1–3 England
- England 1–0 Denmark
- Bulgaria 1–0 Denmark
- England 5–0 Bulgaria

Qualifying Group 2		P	W	D	L	F	A	Pts
**1**	**Scotland**	5	3	2	0	13	5	8
**2**	Belgium	6	2	3	1	8	4	7
**3**	Norway	6	1	3	2	5	12	5
**4**	Portugal	5	0	2	3	2	7	2

- Belgium 4–0 Norway
- Portugal 0–0 Belgium
- Scotland 5–1 Norway
- Portugal 0–3 Scotland
- Norway 0–0 Portugal
- Norway 2–2 Scotland
- Norway 0–0 Belgium
- Belgium 2–1 Portugal
- Portugal 1–2 Norway
- Belgium 0–1 Scotland
- Scotland 2–2 Belgium
- Scotland – Portugal
  (Not played)

Qualifying Group 3		P	W	D	L	F	A	Pts
**1**	**Yugoslavia**	4	2	2	0	4	2	6
**2**	Spain	4	1	2	1	4	2	4
**3**	Cyprus	4	0	2	2	1	5	2

- Spain 0–1 Yugoslavia
- Cyprus 0–0 Spain
- Yugoslavia 1–0 Cyprus
- Yugoslavia 1–1 Spain
- Cyprus 1–1 Yugoslavia
- Spain 3–0 Cyprus

Qualifying Group 4		P	W	D	L	F	A	Pts
**1**	**East Germany**	4	2	2	0	8	3	6
**2**	Poland	4	2	1	1	7	8	5
**3**	Netherlands	4	0	1	3	4	8	1

- E. Germany 2–0 Nether.
- Poland 1–1 E. Germany
- Netherlands 2–3 Poland
- E. Germany 4–1 Poland
- Poland 2–1 Netherlands
- Nether. 1–1 E. Germany

Qualifying Group 5		P	W	D	L	F	A	Pts
**1**	**Czechoslovakia**	4	3	0	1	3	1	6
**2**	France	4	2	1	1	3	2	5
**3**	Sweden	4	0	1	3	1	4	1

- France 2–1 Sweden
- Sweden 0–1 Czechoslo.
- Czechoslo. 1–0 France
- Sweden 0–0 France
- Czechoslo. 1–0 Sweden
- France 1–0 Czechoslo.

Qualifying Group 6		P	W	D	L	F	A	Pts
**1**	**Soviet Union**	4	3	1	0	8	2	7
**2**	Greece	4	2	0	2	5	6	4
**3**	Finland	4	0	1	3	2	7	1

- Finland 0–1 Greece
- Greece 0–3 USSR
- Greece 3–1 Finland
- Finland 0–2 USSR
- USSR 2–1 Greece
- USSR 1–1 Finland

Qualifying Group 7		P	W	D	L	F	A	Pts
**1**	**Hungary**	4	3	0	1	9	4	6
**2**	Romania	4	2	0	2	7	3	4
**3**	Turkey	4	1	0	3	2	11	0

- Turkey 2–3* Hungary
- Hungary 1–0 Romania
- Romania 2–1* Turkey
- Turkey 2–0 Romania
- Hungary 5–0 Turkey
- Romania 4–0 Hungary

(* Both matches awarded 3–0 against Turkey)

Qualifying Group 8		P	W	D	L	F	A	Pts
**1**	**Italy**	4	3	1	0	5	0	7
**2**	Switzerland	4	2	1	1	8	2	5
**3**	Luxembourg	4	0	0	4	1	12	0

- Luxem. 0–3 Switzerland
- Switzerland 0–0 Italy
- Switzerland 5–1 Luxem.
- Italy 1–0 Switzerland
- Luxembourg 0–3 Italy
- Italy 1–0 Luxembourg

=== Qualified teams ===
Country	Qualified as	Previous appearances in tournament^{1}
England	Group 1 winner	1 (1978)
Scotland	Group 2 winner	0 (Debut)
Yugoslavia	Group 3 winner	1 (**1978**)
East Germany	Group 4 winner	1 (1978)
Czechoslovakia	Group 5 winner	1 (1978)
Soviet Union	Group 6 winner	0 (Debut)
Hungary	Group 7 winner	1 (1978)
Italy	Group 8 winner	1 (1978)

^{1} Bold indicates champion for that year

== Squads ==
See 1980 UEFA European Under-21 Championship squads

== Knockout stages ==
Quarter-finals
Soviet Union	3	0	3
Italy	1	0	1
Czechoslovakia	1	1	2
Yugoslavia	1	2	3
Hungary	2	0	2
East Germany	0	3	3
England	2	0	2
Scotland	1	0	1

Semi-finals
Soviet Union	3	1	4
Yugoslavia	0	0	0
East Germany	2	1	3
England	1	0	1

Finals
Soviet Union	0	1	1
East Germany	0	0	0
