= East Germany national under-21 football team =

National U-21 association football team

East Germany
1952–1990
- Association: Deutscher Fußball-Verband der DDR
- Confederation: UEFA (Europe)
- Head coach: Walter Fritzsch
- Most caps: Udo Schmuck (42)
- FIFA code: GDR
First colours	Second colours

First international
- Under-23: Bulgaria 3–2 East Germany (Stara Zagora, Bulgaria; June 7, 1967); Under-21: Turkey 1–1 East Germany (Bursa, Turkey; November 16, 1976)

Last international
- Under-23: France 1–2 East Germany (Poitiers, France; October 11, 1975); Under-21: Austria 0–1 East Germany (Stockerau, Austria; November 14, 1989)

Biggest win
- Under-23: East Germany 6–0 Albania (Potsdam, East Germany; November 3, 1973); Under-21: Austria 1–6 East Germany (Wien, Austria; September 24, 1977)

Biggest defeat
- Under-23: Hungary 4–0 East Germany (Budapest, Hungary; May 28, 1974); Under-21: East Germany 0–4 Norway (Rostock, East Germany; October 29, 1980)

UEFA U-21 Championship
- Appearances: 2 (first in 1978)
- Best result: Runners-up (1978 & 1980)

The East Germany national football team was the national football team of the German Democratic Republic. The East Germany national under-21 football team was a selection team that represented East Germany internationally with an age restriction.

== History ==
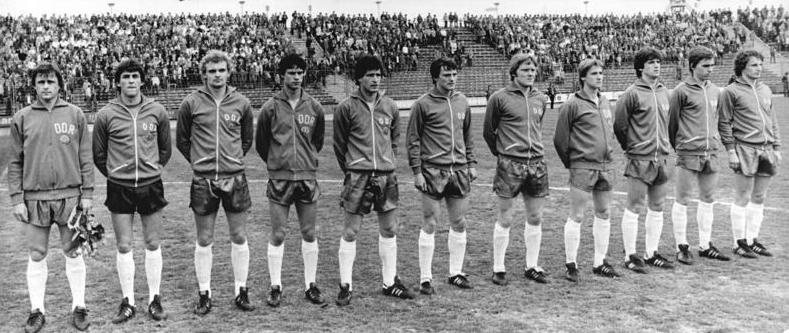
The first leg in the final of the 1980 UEFA European Under-21 Championship against the Soviet Union on 7 May 1980 at the Ostseestadion in Rostock. Standing from left to right: Lothar Kurbjuweit (FC Carl Zeiss Jena), René Müller (1. FC Lokomotive Leipzig), Thomas Dennstedt (1. FC Lokomotive Leipzig), Bernd Schulz (BFC Dynamo), Rainer Troppa (BFC Dynamo), Artur Ullrich (BFC Dynamo), Ralf Sträßer (BFC Dynamo), Ronald Kreer (1. FC Lokomotive Leipzig), Jürgen Raab (FC Carl Zeiss Jena), Jürgen Uteß (FC Hansa Rostock), Thomas Töpfer (FC Carl Zeiss Jena). In the match, Dirk Stahmann (1. FC Magdeburg) and Frank Pastor (HFC Chemie) played as substitutes. In the return leg, Hans-Jürgen Riediger (BFC Dynamo) also played.

The East Germany national under-21 team served as the link between the East Germany national under-18 team (German: Juniorenauswahl) and the East Germany national senior team. The team operated with the neutral name "Next Generation Selection" (German: Nachwuchsauswahl) and the age restriction was not always constant. Only from 1972 to 1976, when an under-23 team and an under-21 team played in parallel, existed a more specific distinction between the under-21 team and the under-23 team. Following the realignment of UEFA's youth competitions in 1976, a distinct East Germany under-21 team was formed.

The team played until the re-unification of Germany in 1990, when East Germany ceased to be a separate country. Before re-unification, the East Germany national under-21 football team was a little bit more successful than its Western counterpart in the UEFA Under-23 Championships and the UEFA Under-21 Championships, finishing runner-up on three occasions. The West Germany national under-21 team finished runner-up once and reached the quarter-finals twice. The East Germany national under-21 football team failed to qualify seven times, while the West Germany national under-21 football team failed to qualify four times and didn't enter on three occasions.

The East Germany under-21 national football team played over 275 official international matches against youth teams from other football associations between 1953 and 1989 - 112 matches as an under-23 team and 164 matches as an under-21 team. From 1978 until 1991, the trainer of the team was Walter Fritzsch.

The team competed in the UEFA European Under-21 Championship. Since the under-21 competition rules state that players must be 21 or under at the start of a two-year competition, technically it is an under-23 competition. East Germany's record for the preceding under-23 competitions is also shown.

== UEFA U-23 Championship Record ==
- 1972: Did not qualify. Finished 3rd of 3 in qualification group.
- 1974: Runners-up.
- 1976: Did not qualify. Finished 2nd of 3 in qualification group.

== UEFA U-21 Championship Record ==
- 1978: Runners-up.
- 1980: Runners-up.
- 1982: Did not qualify. Finished 3rd of 3 in qualification group.
- 1984: Did not qualify. Finished 2nd of 4 in qualification group.
- 1986: Did not qualify. Finished 3rd of 4 in qualification group.
- 1988: Did not qualify. Finished 2nd of 4 in qualification group.
- 1990: Did not qualify. Finished 2nd of 4 in qualification group.

== See also ==
- UEFA European Under-21 Championship
