= 1978 UEFA European Under-21 Championship =

Tournament details
- Dates: 8 March – 31 May
- Teams: 24 (from 1 confederation)

Final positions
- Champions: Yugoslavia (1st title)
- Runners-up: East Germany

Tournament statistics
- Matches played: 62
- Goals scored: 199 (3.21 per match)
- Top scorer: (Socialist Federal Republic of Yugoslavia) Vahid Halilhodžić (6 goals)
- Best player: (Socialist Federal Republic of Yugoslavia) Vahid Halilhodžić

The 1978 UEFA European Under-21 Championship, which spanned two years (1976–78) had 24 entrants. Yugoslavia U-21s won the competition.

The 24 national teams were divided into eight groups. The group winners played off against each other on a two-legged home-and-away basis until the winner was decided. There was no finals tournament or 3rd-place playoff.

== Qualifying stage ==
=== Draw ===
The allocation of teams into qualifying groups was based on that of 1978 FIFA World Cup qualification with several changes, reflecting the absence of some nations:

- Group 1 did not include Portugal (moved to Group 2) and Cyprus, but included Sweden (moved from Group 6)
- Group 2 did not include England and Finland (both moved to Group 5), but included Portugal (moved from Group 1)
- Group 3 did not include Malta
- Group 4 did not include Netherlands, Northern Ireland and Iceland, but included France and Bulgaria (both moved from Group 5)
- Group 5 composed of England and Finland (both moved from Group 2) and Norway (moved from Group 6)
- Group 6 (based on World Cup qualifying Group 7) did not include Wales, but included Switzerland (moved from World Cup Group 6)
- Groups 7 and 8 included the same teams as World Cup qualifying Groups 8 and 9 respectively

Legend
Group winners qualified for the knockout stage

=== Group 1 ===
		P	W	D	L	F	A	Pts
1	Denmark	4	2	1	1	10	5	5
2	Poland	4	2	0	2	7	10	4
3	Sweden	4	1	1	2	6	8	3

Match results
Date	Home	Score	Away	Venue
28 October 1976	Denmark	2–0	Sweden	Copenhagen
30 April 1977	Denmark	6–2	Poland	Slagelse
18 May 1977	Sweden	2–0	Poland	Kalmar
16 June 1977	Sweden	2–2	Denmark	Helsingborg
20 September 1977	Poland	1–0	Denmark	Nowy Sącz
27 October 1977	Poland	4–2	Sweden	Opole

=== Group 2 ===
		P	W	D	L	F	A	Pts
1	Italy	4	3	0	1	13	3	6
2	Portugal	4	3	0	1	7	5	6
3	Luxembourg	4	0	0	4	2	14	0

Match results
Date	Home	Score	Away	Venue
28 November 1976	Luxembourg	1–2	Portugal	Esch-sur-Alzette
23 December 1976	Portugal	1–0	Italy	Funchal
9 February 1977	Italy	4–0	Luxembourg	Como
12 October 1977	Italy	4–1	Portugal	Vicenza
29 October 1977	Portugal	3–0	Luxembourg	Lisbon
12 November 1977	Luxembourg	1–5	Italy	Esch-sur-Alzette

=== Group 3 ===
Qualifying Group 3		P	W	D	L	F	A	Pts
1	East Germany	4	3	1	0	13	3	7
2	Turkey	4	1	2	1	5	8	4
3	Austria	4	0	1	3	5	12	1

Match results
Date	Home	Score	Away	Venue
16 November 1976	Turkey	1–1	East Germany	Bursa
17 April 1977	Austria	2–2	Turkey	Vienna
24 September 1977	Austria	1–6	East Germany	Vienna
11 October 1977	East Germany	2–1	Austria	Erfurt
29 October 1977	Turkey	2–1	Austria	Manisa
15 November 1977	East Germany	4–0	Turkey	Magdeburg

=== Group 4 ===
		P	W	D	L	F	A	Pts
1	Bulgaria	4	4	0	0	5	1	8
2	Belgium	4	1	1	2	3	4	3
3	France	4	0	1	3	3	6	1

Match results
Date	Home	Score	Away	Venue
3 September 1976	France	1–1	Belgium	Amiens
10 October 1976	France	0–1	Bulgaria	Le Havre
29 March 1977	Belgium	2–1	France	Courtrai
1 June 1977	Belgium	0–1	Bulgaria	Brussels
26 October 1977	Bulgaria	1–0	Belgium	Burgas
15 November 1977	Bulgaria	2–1	France	Stara Zagora

=== Group 5 ===
		P	W	D	L	F	A	Pts
1	England	4	4	0	0	17	2	8
2	Norway	4	2	0	2	6	9	4
3	Finland	4	0	0	4	2	14	0

Match results
Date	Home	Score	Away	Venue
27 October 1976	Finland	1–4	Norway	Helsinki
26 May 1977	Finland	0–1	England	Helsinki
1 June 1977	Norway	1–2	England	Bergen
17 August 1977	Norway	1–0	Finland	Grue
6 September 1977	England	6–0	Norway	Brighton
12 October 1977	England	8–1	Finland	Hull

=== Group 6 ===
		P	W	D	L	F	A	Pts
1	Czechoslovakia	4	2	1	1	7	2	5
2	Scotland	4	2	1	1	5	4	5
3	Switzerland	4	1	0	3	3	9	2

Match results
Date	Home	Score	Away	Venue
12 October 1976	Czechoslovakia	0–0	Scotland	Plzeň
30 March 1977	Switzerland	2–0	Scotland	Bern
24 May 1977	Czechoslovakia	4–0	Switzerland	České Budějovice
7 September 1977	Scotland	3–1	Switzerland	Glasgow
20 September 1977	Scotland	2–1	Czechoslovakia	Edinburgh
5 October 1977	Switzerland	0–2	Czechoslovakia	Zürich

=== Group 7 ===
		P	W	D	L	F	A	Pts
1	Yugoslavia	4	3	0	1	9	3	6
2	Spain	4	2	0	2	5	8	4
3	Romania	4	1	0	3	5	8	2

Match results
Date	Home	Score	Away	Venue
9 October 1976	Yugoslavia	4–1	Spain	Zagreb
17 April 1977	Spain	3–0	Romania	Madrid
8 May 1977	Romania	1–3	Yugoslavia	Craiova
26 October 1977	Romania	4–0	Spain	Bucharest
12 November 1977	Yugoslavia	2–0	Romania	Osijek
30 November 1977	Spain	1–0	Yugoslavia	Elche

=== Group 8 ===
		P	W	D	L	F	A	Pts
1	Hungary	4	2	2	0	9	1	6
2	Soviet Union	4	2	1	1	5	1	5
3	Greece	4	0	1	3	1	13	1

Match results
Date	Home	Score	Away	Venue
9 October 1976	Hungary	7–0	Greece	Kecskemét
24 April 1977	Greece	0–2	Soviet Union	Athens
29 April 1977	Soviet Union	0–0	Hungary	Moscow
9 May 1977	Soviet Union	3–0	Greece	Moscow
17 May 1977	Hungary	1–0	Soviet Union	Békéscsaba
28 May 1977	Greece	1–1	Hungary	Serres

=== Qualified teams ===
Country	Qualified as	Previous appearances in tournament
Denmark	Group 1 winner	0 (Debut)
Italy	Group 2 winner	0 (Debut)
East Germany	Group 3 winner	0 (Debut)
Bulgaria	Group 4 winner	0 (Debut)
England	Group 5 winner	0 (Debut)
Czechoslovakia	Group 6 winner	0 (Debut)
Yugoslavia	Group 7 winner	0 (Debut)
Hungary	Group 8 winner	0 (Debut)

== Knockout stage ==
Quarter-finals
England	2	0	2
Italy	1	0	1
Yugoslavia	0	2	2
Hungary	1	0	1
Czechoslovakia	3	2	5
East Germany	1	5	6
Denmark	4	0	4
Bulgaria (a)	1	3	4

Semi-finals
England	1	1	2
Yugoslavia	2	1	3
East Germany	1	3	4
Bulgaria	2	1	3

Finals
Yugoslavia	1	4	5
East Germany	0	4	4

== Final ==
GDR-YUG 0:1
Halle, 17.5.1978., Scorer: Halilhodžić ('53).
GDR: Heyne, Brauer, Hause (Vingel), Uhlig, Roth, Weber, Terletzki, Eigendorf (Mischinger), Kuhn, Kotte, Riediger.
YUG: Stojanović, Vujkov, Hrstić, Zajec, Stojković, Bogdan, Krmpotić, Klinčarski, Halilhodžić, Bošnjak (R. Savić), Desnica (Slišković).

YUG-GDR 4:4
Mostar, 31.5.1978., Scorers: Halilhodžić ('9, '37), Desnica ('16), Bogdan ('50) - Kotte ('2), Kuhn ('11, '31), Riediger ('15).
YUG: Stojanović, Krmpotić, M.Obradović, Zajec, Stojković, Bogdan, Bošnjak (Starčević), Savić, Halilhodžić, Klinčarski (Verlašević), Desnica.
GDR: Heyne, Hause, Brauer (Vingel), Uhlig, Roth, Schnuphase, Weber, Eigendorf, Riediger, Kotte, Kuhn.
