= Yugoslavia national under-21 football team =

National youth association football team

Yugoslavia Under-21
- Association: Football Association of Yugoslavia
First colours	Second colours

First international
- U-23: Bulgaria 1–2 Yugoslavia (Socialist Federal Republic of Yugoslavia); Rousse, October 26, 1968; U-21: (Socialist Federal Republic of Yugoslavia) Yugoslavia 4–1 Spain; Zagreb, October 9, 1976

Biggest win
- U-23: (Socialist Federal Republic of Yugoslavia) Yugoslavia 4–0 Hungary; Bosanska Gradiška, September 21, 1972; U-21: (Socialist Federal Republic of Yugoslavia) Yugoslavia 5–0 San Marino; Belgrade, March 13, 1991

Biggest defeat
- U-23: Netherlands 5–2 Yugoslavia (Socialist Federal Republic of Yugoslavia); Eindhoven, October 10, 1970; U-21: France 7–0 Yugoslavia (Socialist Federal Republic of Yugoslavia); Reims, November 16, 1985

UEFA U-21 Championship
- Appearances: 4 (first in 1978)
- Best result: Winners: 1978

The Yugoslavia national under-21 football team existed in the Socialist Federal Republic of Yugoslavia.

After the state's dissolution in 1992, the following teams were formed:

- Bosnia and Herzegovina national under-21 football team
- Croatia national under-21 football team
- North Macedonia national under-21 football team
- Kosovo national under-21 football team
- Slovenia national under-21 football team
- FR Yugoslavia national under-21 football team
- Serbia national under-21 football team
- Montenegro national under-21 football team

Following the realignment of UEFA's youth competitions in 1976, Yugoslavia's Under-21 team was formed. The team had a varied record, reaching the last four in four tournaments and failing to qualify for four. Yugoslavia won the inaugural competition in 1978. Since the under-21 competition rules insist that players must be 21 or under at the start of a two-year competition, technically it is an U-23 competition. Yugoslavia's record in U-23 competitions is also shown.

== UEFA European Under-23 Challenge Cup ==
Yugoslavia were randomly chosen to play holders Bulgaria for the title, which they won. They then faced (and beat) other randomly chosen teams until the competition was abandoned in summer 1970 for a larger competition.

- October 26, 1968: Bulgaria 1–2 Yugoslavia
- June 6, 1969: Yugoslavia 3–0 Spain
- November 6, 1969: Yugoslavia 2–0 Sweden
- March 24, 1970: Greece 1–5 Yugoslavia
- 1972: Did not qualify. Finished 2nd of 3 in qualification group.
- 1974: Did not qualify. Finished 2nd of 3 in qualification group.
- 1976: Losing semi-finalists.

This was competed for on a basis similar to a boxing title belt. The holders played a randomly chosen opponent for the championship.

== UEFA U-21 Championship record ==
- 1978: Winners.
- 1980: Losing semi-finalists.
- 1982: Did not qualify. Finished 2nd of 3 in qualification group.
- 1984: Losing semi-finalists.
- 1986: Did not qualify. Finished 4th of 4 in qualification group.
- 1988: Did not qualify. Finished 3rd of 3 in qualification group.
- 1990: Runners-up.
- 1992: Did not qualify. Finished 2nd of 4 in qualification group.

== See also ==
- Yugoslavia national football team
- UEFA European Under-21 Championship
- Bosnia and Herzegovina national under-21 football team
- Croatia national under-21 football team
- Kosovo national under-21 football team
- Montenegro national under-21 football team
- North Macedonia national under-21 football team
- Serbia national under-21 football team
- Slovenia national under-21 football team
