= 2025 in Estonian football =

Football in Estonia
- Season: 2025

Men's football
- Esiliiga: FC Nõmme United
- Esiliiga B: Maardu Linnameeskond
- Beach football: SK Augur Enemat/Coolbet
- Futsal: Tallinna FC Bunker Partner
- Tipneri karikas: Nõmme Kalju FC
- Supercup: Tallinna FCI Levadia

Women's football
- Meistriliiga: Tallinna FC Flora
- Esiliiga: Tallinna FC Flora II
- Futsal: Tallinna FC Ajax
- Estonian Cup: Tallinna FC Flora
- Supercup: Tallinna FC Flora

This page summarizes everything related to Estonian football in the year 2025. It contains information about different league systems, national teams, futsal, beach football and most important transfers.

== National teams ==
Times are EET/EEST, (Note: EEST (UTC+3) for dates between 30 March and 26 October 2025 and EET (UTC+2) for all other dates.) as listed by UEFA.

=== Association football ===
==== Men ====
===== Senior =====
22 March 2026 WC Q — R1	Israel	2–1	Estonia	Debrecen, Hungary
21:45 (UTC+3)	Hein 23' (o.g.); Dasa 75'	Report	10' Paskotši	Stadium: Nagyerdei Stadion (Note: Due to the Gaza war, Israel are required to play their home matches at neutral venues until further notice.); Attendance: 270; Referee: Nikola Dabanović (Montenegro)

25 March 2026 WC Q — R1	Moldova	2–3	Estonia	Chișinău, Moldova
21:45 (UTC+3)	Nicolaescu 67'; Caimacov 90+1'	Report	19' Peetson; 30' Sappinen; 70' Käit	Stadium: Zimbru Stadium; Attendance: 6,112; Referee: Lawrence Visser (Belgium)

6 June 2026 WC Q — R1	Estonia	1–3	Israel	Tallinn, Estonia
21:45 (UTC+3)	Käit 31'	Report	39', 49' Biton; 89' (pen.) Abu Fani	Stadium: Lilleküla Stadium; Attendance: 5,967; Referee: Willy Delajod (France)

9 June 2026 WC Q — R1	Estonia	0–1	Norway	Tallinn, Estonia
21:45 (UTC+3)		Report	62' Haaland	Stadium: Lilleküla Stadium; Attendance: 11,577; Referee: Srđan Jovanović (Serbia)

5 September 2026 WC Q — R1	Italy	5–0	Estonia	Bergamo, Italy
21:45 (UTC+3)	Kean 58'; Retegui 69', 89'; Raspadori 71'; Bastoni 90+2'	Report		Stadium: Stadio Atleti Azzurri d'Italia; Attendance: 22,559; Referee: João Pinheiro (Portugal)

9 September Friendly	Estonia	0–0	Andorra	Tallinn, Estonia
19:00 (UTC+3)		Report		Stadium: Lilleküla Stadium; Attendance: 4,641; Referee: Oliver Reitala (Finland)

11 October 2026 WC Q — R1	Estonia	1–3	Italy	Tallinn, Estonia
21:45 (UTC+3)	Sappinen 76'	Report	4' Kean; 38' Retegui; 74' Esposito	Stadium: Lilleküla Stadium; Attendance: 11,913; Referee: Serdar Gözübüyük (Netherlands)

14 October 2026 WC Q — R1	Estonia	1–1	Moldova	Tallinn, Estonia
19:00 (UTC+3)	Käit 12'	Report	64' Bodisteanu	Stadium: Lilleküla Stadium; Attendance: 4,731; Referee: Igor Pajač (Croatia)

13 November 2026 WC Q — R1	Norway	4–1	Estonia	Oslo, Norway
19:00 (UTC+3)	Sørloth 50', 52'; Haaland 56', 62'	Report	64' Saarma	Stadium: Ullevaal Stadion; Attendance: 25,493; Referee: Matej Jug (Slovenia)

18 November Friendly	Cyprus	2–4	Estonia	Limassol, Cyprus
21:45 (UTC+3)	Andreou 16'; Kakoullis 48'	Report	44' (o.g.) Kyprianou; 78', 83', 87' Sappinen	Stadium: Alphamega Stadium; Referee: Orel Grinfeld (Israel)

===== U21 =====
25 March Friendly	Malta	1–1	Estonia	Ta' Qali, Malta
20:00	Ewurum 24'	Report	21' Mustmaa	Stadium: Centenary Stadium; Referee: Trustin Farrugia Cann (Malta)

7 June 2027 EC qualifying — first round	Faroe Islands	2–1	Estonia	Klaksvík, Faroe Islands
20:00	Josephsen 73'; Samuelsen 90+5' (pen.)	Report	50' Siht	Stadium: Við Djúpumýrar; Attendance: 268; Referee: Mehmet Türkmen (Turkey)

5 September 2027 EC qualifying — first round	Estonia	0–2	Switzerland	Tallinn, Estonia
19:00		Report	9' Vogt; 90' Konietzke	Stadium: Kadriorg Stadium; Attendance: 354; Referee: Igor Bosca (Moldova)

9 September 2027 EC qualifying — first round	Estonia	1–1	Iceland	Tallinn, Estonia
19:00	Pajo 39'	Report	87' Andrésson	Stadium: Kadriorg Stadium; Attendance: 286; Referee: Mikkel Redder (Denmark)

10 October 2027 EC qualifying — first round	Estonia	2–2	Luxembourg	Tallinn, Estonia
19:00	Siht 31'; Agaptvsev 59'	Report	8' Lohei; 70' (pen.) Duarte	Stadium: Kadriorg Stadium; Attendance: 247; Referee: Dmytro Panchyshyn (Ukraine)

13 October 2027 EC qualifying — first round	France	6–1	Estonia	Grenoble, France
19:30	Tel 9'; Cissé 12'; Kroupi 49', 86'; Odobert 63', 79'		45+3' Varjund	Stadium: Stade des Alpes; Attendance: 4,191; Referee: Jakob Semler (Austria)

==== Women ====
===== Senior =====
20 February Friendly	Puerto Rico	1–0	Estonia	Alanya, Turkey
14:30 (UTC+3)	Gloria Douglas 61'	Report		Stadium: Gold City Sport Complex; Attendance: 30; Referee: Asen Albayrak (Turkey)

25 February 2025 NL C — group 5	Israel	3–1	Estonia	Győr, Hungary
15:30 (UTC+3)	Noa Selimhodzic 35'; Elianna Beard 48'; Irena Kuznezov 80'	Report	78' Katrin Kirpu	Stadium: Gyirmóti Stadion; Referee: Briet Bragadottir (Iceland)

4 April 2025 NL C — group 5	Estonia	0–0	Bulgaria	Tallinn, Estonia
19:00		Report		Stadium: Lilleküla Stadium; Attendance: 457; Referee: Stacey Pearson (England)

30 May 2025 NL C — group 5	Estonia	0–3	Israel	Tallinn, Estonia
17:00		Report	39' Selimhodzic; 75' Cohen; 90+5' Ben Israel	Stadium: Kadriorg Stadium; Attendance: 583; Referee: Charlotte Carpenter (Wales)

3 June 2025 NL C — group 5	Bulgaria	0–1	Estonia	Sofia, Bulgaria
TBD		Report	90+1' Teern	Stadium: Stadion Aleksandar Shalamanov; Attendance: 470; Referee: Ioanna Allayiotou (Cyprus)

28 June Friendly	Estonia	0–1	Kosovo	Tallinn, Estonia
17:00		Report	72' Imeraj	Stadium: Kadriorg Stadium; Attendance: 194; Referee: Jelena Jermolajeva (Latvia)

1 July Friendly	Estonia	2–2	Kosovo	Tallinn, Estonia
19:00	Lillemäe 13'; Salei 46'	Report	30' Biqkaj; 41' Memeti	Stadium: Kadriorg Stadium; Attendance: 327; Referee: Satu Miettunen (Finland)

24 October 2025 Baltic Cup — Semifinal	Estonia	0–1	Latvia	Raudondvaris, Lithuania
13:00		Report	17' Miksone	Stadium: Raudondvaris Stadium; Attendance: 40; Referee: Jurgita Mačikunytė (Lithuania)

27 October 2025 Baltic Cup — Third place	Estonia	v	Faroe Islands	Raudondvaris, Lithuania
12:30				Stadium: Raudondvaris Stadium

=== Futsal ===
==== Men ====
===== Senior =====
7 March Friendly	Estonia	2–1	Kyrgyzstan	Jõhvi, Estonia
19:00	Vnukov 5'; Zahharov 37'	Report	36' Murzakulov	Stadium: Jõhvi Sports Hall; Attendance: 526; Referee: Grigori Ošomkov (Estonia)

9 March Friendly	Estonia	4–7	Kyrgyzstan	Tallinn, Estonia
15:00	Matinaro 2'; Kanatbekov 3' (o.g.); Desjatski 7', 25'	Report	2', 10' Aimen Kanatbekov; 6', 19', 32' Semetei Murzakulov; 18' (pen.) Maksat Alimov; 35' Islam Turatbekov	Stadium: Sõle Sports Centre; Attendance: 176; Referee: Jagnar Jakobson (Estonia)

== League system ==
=== Association football ===
==== Men ====
===== Premium liiga =====
Pos	Team	Pld	W	D	L	GF	GA	GD	Pts	Promotion, qualification or relegation
1	Tallinna FC Flora (C)	36	26	4	6	84	31	+53	82	Champions League first qualifying round
2	Tallinna FCI Levadia	36	25	4	7	89	36	+53	79	Conference League first qualifying round
3	Nõmme Kalju FC	36	23	5	8	69	37	+32	74	Conference League first qualifying round
4	Paide Linnameeskond	36	21	7	8	63	32	+31	70	
5	JK Narva Trans	36	15	6	15	53	52	+1	51	
6	Pärnu JK Vaprus	36	14	7	15	54	51	+3	49	
7	Harju JK Laagri	36	10	6	20	49	70	−21	36	
8	Tartu JK Tammeka	36	9	3	24	47	83	−36	30	
9	FC Kuressaare	36	8	4	24	32	67	−35	28	Play-off for Esiliiga
10	JK Tallinna Kalev (R)	36	5	2	29	32	113	−81	17	Esiliiga

Source: EJL
Rules for classification: 1) Points; 2) Less matches awarded against; 3) Head-to-head points; 4) Head-to-head goal difference; 5) Matches won; 6) Goal difference; 7) Goals scored; 8) Away goals scored; 9) Fairplay ranking.
(C) Champions; (R) Relegated
Locations of the 2024 Meistriliiga teams

Relegation play-off:

Team 1	Agg.	Team 2	1st leg	2nd leg
Viimsi JK (Esiliiga 2nd)	0–3	FC Kuressaare (Meistriliiga 9th)	0–1	0–2

===== Esiliiga =====
Pos	Team	Pld	W	D	L	GF	GA	GD	Pts	Promotion, qualification or relegation
1	FC Nõmme United (C, P)	36	30	2	4	125	27	+98	92	Meistriliiga
2	Viimsi JK	36	24	6	6	83	27	+56	78	Promotion play-off
3	Tartu JK Welco	36	18	9	9	76	56	+20	63	
4	FC Elva	36	17	7	12	62	59	+3	58	
5	Tallinna FC Flora U21 (Note: Reserve teams are ineligible for promotion.)	36	13	9	14	61	56	+5	48	
6	Nõmme Kalju FC U21	36	13	6	17	56	79	−23	45	
7	Tallinna FCI Levadia U21	36	12	9	15	62	67	−5	45	
8	FC Tallinn	36	11	7	18	61	75	−14	40	Play-off for Esiliiga B
9	JK Tallinna Kalev U21 (R)	36	5	12	19	53	96	−43	27	Esiliiga B
10	Tartu JK Tammeka U21 (R)	36	3	1	32	40	137	−97	10	Esiliiga B

Source: EJL
Rules for classification: 1) Points; 2) Less matches awarded against; 3) Head-to-head points; 4) Head-to-head goal difference; 5) Matches won; 6) Goal difference; 7) Goals scored; 8) Away goals scored; 9) Fairplay ranking.
(C) Champions; (P) Promoted; (R) Relegated
Notes:
Locations of the 2025 Esiliiga teams

Relegation play-off:

Team 1	Agg.	Team 2	1st leg	2nd leg
Jõhvi FC Phoenix (Esiliiga B 3rd)	2:3	FC Tallinn (Esiliiga 8th)	2:2	0:1 (A.E.T.)

===== Esiliiga B =====
Pos	Team	Pld	W	D	L	GF	GA	GD	Pts	Promotion, qualification or relegation
1	Maardu Linnameeskond (C, P)	36	28	5	3	116	39	+77	89	Esiliiga
2	FC Nõmme United U21 (Note: Reserve teams are ineligible for promotion.) (P)	36	23	3	10	93	53	+40	72	Esiliiga
3	Jõhvi FC Phoenix	36	21	5	10	95	61	+34	68	Promotion play-off
4	JK Narva Trans U21	36	21	3	12	87	53	+34	66	
5	FA Tartu Kalev	36	19	4	13	81	53	+28	61	
6	JK Tabasalu	36	13	8	15	60	67	−7	47	
7	Tallinna JK Legion	36	13	5	18	66	94	−28	44	
8	Paide Linnameeskond U21 (R)	36	11	8	17	65	71	−6	41	Play-off for II liiga
9	FC Kuressaare U21 (R)	36	6	1	29	40	105	−65	19	II liiga
10	Läänemaa JK (R)	36	3	2	31	33	140	−107	11	II liiga

Source: EJL
Rules for classification: 1) Points; 2) Less matches awarded against; 3) Head-to-head points; 4) Head-to-head goal difference; 5) Matches won; 6) Goal difference; 7) Goals scored; 8) Away goals scored; 9) Fairplay ranking.
(C) Champions; (P) Promoted; (R) Relegated
Notes:
Locations of the 2025 Esiliiga B teams

Relegation play-off:

Team 1	Agg.	Team 2	1st leg	2nd leg
Viljandi JK Tulevik (II liiga 3rd)	7:4	Paide Linnameeskond U21 (Esiliiga B 8th)	5:1	2:3

===== II liiga =====
Pos	Team	Pld	W	D	L	GF	GA	GD	Pts	Promotion, qualification or relegation
1	Pärnu JK Vaprus U21 (C, P)	30	21	2	7	94	30	+64	65	Esiliiga B
2	Tallinna FCI Levadia U19 (P)	30	19	5	6	83	32	+51	62	Esiliiga B
3	Viljandi JK Tulevik (P)	30	17	6	7	89	40	+49	57	Promotion play-off
4	Tartu JK Welco II (Note: Reserve teams named using "II" are ineligible for promotion.)	30	17	6	7	83	40	+43	57	
5	Viimsi JK U21	30	16	4	10	54	52	+2	52	
6	Harju JK Laagri U21	30	16	4	10	77	55	+22	52	
7	Rakvere JK Tarvas	30	15	6	9	52	33	+19	51	
8	FC Tallinn U21	30	15	5	10	67	54	+13	50	
9	Tallinna FC Flora U19	30	14	4	12	72	54	+18	46	
10	Tallinna JK Puuma	30	13	5	12	85	84	+1	44	Did not compete next year
11	FC Hiiumaa	30	12	6	12	54	56	−2	42	
12	FA Tartu Kalev U21 (Note: Reserve teams are ineligible for promotion.)	30	12	5	13	55	67	−12	41	
13	Tartu FC Helios	30	8	2	20	38	87	−49	26	
14	Saku Sporting (R)	30	6	1	23	29	100	−71	19	Play-off for II liiga B
15	Keila JK	30	5	3	22	35	102	−67	18	Readmitted
16	Pärnu JK Poseidon (R)	30	0	4	26	25	106	−81	4	II liiga B

Source: EJL
Rules for classification: 1) Points; 2) Less matches awarded against; 3) Head-to-head points; 4) Head-to-head goal difference; 5) Matches won; 6) Goal difference; 7) Goals scored; 8) Away goals scored; 9) Fairplay ranking.
(C) Champions; (P) Promoted; (R) Relegated
Notes:

Relegation play-off:

Team 1	Agg.	Team 2	1st leg	2nd leg
Raasiku FC Joker (II.B S/W 2nd)	5–8	Saue JK (II.B N/E 4th)	0–6	5–2
Saue JK (II.B p-o winner)	11–0	Saku Sporting (II 14th)	6–0	5–0

===== II liiga B =====
Group A (North & East)
Pos	Team	Pld	Pts
1	Tallinna FC Zapoos (C)	24	59
2	Tabasalu Ulasabat C.F.	24	55
3	Vändra JK Vaprus	24	53
4	Saue JK	24	50
5	JK Tallinna Kalev Juunior	24	48
6	Tallinna FC Tamper	24	43
7	Kristiine JK	24	30
8	Tallinna FC Zealot Sporting	24	29
9	JK Tabasalu U21	24	24
10	Pärnu JK Vaprus U19	24	21
11	Rae Spordikool	24	12
12	Põhja-Tallinna JK Volta	24	12
13	Raplamaa JK	24	9
14	Saku Sporting II (D)	0	0

Source: EJL
(C) Champions; (D) Disqualified

Group B (South & West)
Pos	Team	Pld	Pts
1	Tallinna FC Smsraha (C)	26	68
2	Raasiku FC Joker	26	65
3	Maardu LM II & Tallinna FC Starmedia ÜM	26	62
4	Jõgeva SK Noorus-96	26	55
5	Paide Linnameeskond III	26	53
6	Võru FC Helios	26	39
7	FC Kose	26	32
8	FC Elva II	26	29
9	Põlva FC Lootos	26	28
10	Lasnamäe FC Ajax	26	27
11	Nõmme Kalju FC III	26	24
12	Viljandi JK Tulevik II	26	18
13	JK Kuusalu Kalev	26	18
14	Kohtla-Järve Linnameeskond	26	11

Source: EJL
(C) Champions

Post-season games:
Champion's match:

4 November Final	Tallinna FC Smsraha	1–0	Tallinna FC Zapoos	Tallinn, Estonia
20:45	Pabo 77'	Report		Stadium: Infoneti Lasnamäe stadium Attendance: 68; Referee: Paul Kask

Relegation play-off:

Team 1	Agg.	Team 2	1st leg	2nd leg
Läänemaa JK II (III N/W 3rd)	2–4	Põhja-Tallinna JK Volta (II.B N/E 12th)	2–1	0–3

===== III liiga =====
Group A (North)
Pos	Team	Pld	Pts
1	Türi Ganvix JK (C)	21	52
2	FC Järva-Jaani	21	42
3	Tallinna FC Eston Villa	21	38
4	Rumori Calcio Tallinn	21	29
5	Kohila Püsivus	21	28
6	Tallinna FC Flora U18	21	27
7	Tallinna FC Maksatransport	21	25
8	TalTech Jalgpalliklubi (D)	21	2

Source: EJL
(C) Champions; (D) Disqualified

Group B (North/West)
Pos	Team	Pld	Pts
1	Rummu Dünamo (C)	21	49
2	Läänemaa JK II	21	47
3	Märjamaa Kompanii	21	33
4	Tallinna Mustamäe Jalgpalliklubi	21	30
5	Tabasalu Ulasabat C.F. II	21	25
6	Harju JK Laagri III	21	23
7	Keila JK II	21	18
8	FCP Pärnu (D)	21	11

Source: EJL
(C) Champions; (D) Disqualified

Group C (North/East)
Pos	Team	Pld	Pts
1	Tallinna FC Hell Hunt (C)	21	54
2	FC Pelgu City	21	40
3	Viimsi Lõvid	21	39
4	Tallinna JK Piraaja	21	37
5	JK Loo	21	23
6	FC Maardu Aliens	21	22
7	Aruküla FC Vigri	21	18
8	JK Kuusalu Kalev II	21	7

Source: EJL
(C) Champions

Group D (South/East)
Pos	Team	Pld	Pts
1	Tartu JK Welco X (C)	14	33
2	Tartu Team Helm	14	33
3	FC Otepää	14	25
4	FC Vastseliina	14	25
5	Tõrva JK	14	20
6	Rakvere JK Tarvas II	14	19
7	Valga FC Warrior	14	10
8	FC Lootus Järve Jalgpallikool	14	0

Source: EJL
(C) Champions

Champion's match:

18 October Semifinal	Tartu JK Welco X	1–4	Rummu Dünamo	Tartu, Estonia
18:00	Znamenski 53'	Report	3' Ivanuško; 21' Šljaga; 67', 79' Sui	Stadium: Holm Jalgpallipark; Attendance: 21; Referee: Jan Justin Paju

26 October Semifinal	Tallinna FC Hell Hunt	6–4	Türi Ganvix JK	Tallinn, Estonia
19:00	Kaisel 15'; Piel 23'; Heinaste 33', 36'; Mööl 47', 81'	Report	21', 75', 85' Poolma; 58' Usar	Stadium: Nike Arena; Attendance: 23; Referee: Oliver Raudsepp

30 October Final	Tallinna FC Hell Hunt	3–3 (4–2 p)	Rummu Dünamo	Tallinn, Estonia
20:30	Heinaste 24' (pen.); Mööl 28'; Piel 35'	Report	7' (o.g.) Velt; 33' Hmeljov; 49' Portyankin	Stadium: Nike Arena; Attendance: 65; Referee: Mark-Oskar Arst

===== IV liiga =====
Group A (North/East)
Pos	Team	Pld	Pts
1	Tallinna JK Jalgpallihaigla (C)	21	50
2	Tallinna FC EstHam United	21	37
3	Jõgeva SK Noorus-96 II	21	35
4	Tallinna FC Soccernet	21	29
5	Tallinna FC Reaal	21	27
6	Rumori Calcio II Tallinn	21	22
7	FC Toompea	21	21
8	Tallinna Mustamäe JK & FC Gamesport ÜM	21	19

Source: EJL
(C) Champions

Group B (North/West)
Pos	Team	Pld	Pts
1	FC Tallinna Wolves (C)	18	47
2	Saue JK II	18	36
3	Tallinna FC Olympic	18	32
4	JK Arsenal & Põhja-Tallinna JK Volta ÜM	18	23
5	FC Kose II	18	23
6	Tallinna FC Wise	18	12
7	Harju JK Laagri III (D)	18	10

Source: EJL
(C) Champions; (D) Disqualified

Champion's match:

25 October Final	FC Tallinna Wolves	2–5	Tallinna JK Jalgpallihaigla	Tallinn, Estonia
17:00	Kaasma 57'; Sein 86'	Report	11' Mazov; 53', 73' Reinaru; 69' Suup; 90' Siniallik	Stadium: Wismari jalgpallistaadion Attendance: 95; Referee: Kaspar Krill

==== Women ====
===== Naiste Meistriliiga =====
Pos	Team	Pld	W	D	L	GF	GA	GD	Pts	Promotion, qualification or relegation
1	Tallinna FC Flora (C)	24	22	1	1	101	10	+91	67	Qualification for the Champions League first qualifying round
2	Saku Sporting	23	16	2	5	75	34	+41	50	
3	JK Tabasalu	24	13	2	9	45	45	0	41	
4	Viimsi JK	23	12	4	7	50	29	+21	40	
5	JK Tallinna Kalev	24	9	3	12	57	70	−13	30	
6	Tartu JK Tammeka	24	3	5	16	29	83	−54	14	
7	FC Elva	23	3	1	19	20	80	−60	10	
8	Tallinna FC Ararat (D)	21	5	2	14	22	48	−26	17	Disqualified

Updated to match(es) played on 19 October. Source: EJL
Rules for classification: 1) Points; 2) Less matches awarded against; 3) Head-to-head points; 4) Head-to-head goal difference; 5) Matches won; 6) Goal difference; 7) Goals scored; 8) Away goals scored; 9) Fair-play ranking.
(C) Champions; (D) Disqualified
Locations of the 2025 Naiste Meistriliiga teams

=== Futsal ===
==== Men ====
===== Saalijalgpalli Meistriliiga =====
Main phase:

Pos	Team	Pld	W	D	L	GF	GA	GD	Pts	Promotion, qualification or relegation
1	Narva United FC	14	11	3	0	80	42	+38	36	Championship play-off quarterfinal
2	Tallinna FC Bunker Partner	14	10	2	2	100	48	+52	32	Championship play-off quarterfinal
3	Kopli Coolbet	14	7	3	4	84	52	+32	24	Championship play-off quarterfinal
4	Tartu Ravens Futsal	14	6	3	5	69	65	+4	21	Championship play-off quarterfinal
5	Sillamäe Silla FC	14	4	6	4	63	48	+15	18	Championship play-off quarterfinal
6	Jõhvi FC Phoenix	14	5	1	8	52	81	−29	16	Championship play-off quarterfinal
7	Saku Sporting	14	3	2	9	46	67	−21	11	Relegation play-offs
8	Rummu Dünamo	14	0	0	14	36	127	−91	0	Relegation

Source: EJL
Rules for classification: 1) Points; 2) Less matches awarded against; 3) Head-to-head points; 4) Head-to-head goal difference; 5) Matches won; 6) Goal difference; 7) Goals scored; 8) Draw.
Locations of the 2023-24 Coolbet Saaliliiga teams

Play-offs:

Quarterfinal
3	Kopli Coolbet	7	7	–	2
6	Jõhvi FC Phoenix	2	3	–	0
4	Tartu Ravens Futsal	5	7	–	2
5	Sillamäe Silla FC	3	2	–	0

Semifinal
2	Tallinna FC Bunker Partner	8	7	–	2
3	Kopli Coolbet	1	1	–	0
1	Narva United FC	6	3	5 (1)	1
4	Tartu Ravens Futsal	3	4	5 (3)	2

Final
2	Tallinna FC Bunker Partner	6	5	8	3
4	Tartu Ravens Futsal	0	4	5	0
3rd place
3	Kopli Coolbet	3
1	Narva United FC	4

Relegation play-off:

Team 1	Agg.	Team 2	1st leg	2nd leg
Tartu FC Inter (Esiliiga 3rd)		Saku Sporting (Saalijalgpalli Meistriliiga 7th)		

== Cup competitions ==
=== Association football ===
==== Men ====
===== Tipneri karikavõistlused =====
Quarterfinals
EL	FC Tallinn	0
PL	JK Tallinna Kalev	5
PL	Nõmme Kalju FC	1
PL	Paide Linnameeskond	0
PL	Tallinna FCI Levadia	7
IIB	Tallinna FC Zapoos	0
PL	JK Narva Trans	3
PL	Pärnu JK Vaprus	1

Semifinals
PL	JK Tallinna Kalev	0
EL	Nõmme Kalju FC	5
PL	Tallinna FCI Levadia	1
PL	JK Narva Trans	0

Final
PL	Nõmme Kalju FC	3 (4)
PL	Tallinna FCI Levadia	3 (1)

Home teams listed on top of bracket. (AET): At Extra Time, (PL): Premium liiga, (EL): Esiliiga, (ELB): Esiliiga B

===== Small Cup =====
Quarterfinals
II	FC Hiiumaa	3
III	Tallinna FC Hell Hunt	2
III	Tallinna JK Piraaja	0
II	Rakvere JK Tarvas	3
IIB	JK Tallinna Kalev Juunior	1
IIB	Paide Linnameeskond III	2
IIB	Vändra JK Vaprus	4
II	Harju JK Laagri U21	1

Semifinals
II	Rakvere JK Tarvas	1 (2)
II	FC Hiiumaa	1 (4)
IIB	Paide Linnameeskond III	3
IIB	Vändra JK Vaprus	1

Final
IIB	Paide Linnameeskond III	4
II	FC Hiiumaa	2

Home teams listed on top of bracket. (AET): At Extra Time, (II): II liiga, (IIB): II liiga B, (III): III liiga

== European competitions ==
=== Association football ===
==== Men ====
===== FCI Levadia =====
8 July 2025 Champions League Q1	FCI Levadia (Estonia)	0–1	(Latvia) RFS	Tallinn, Estonia
19:30 UTC+3		Report	56' (pen.) Panić	Stadium: Lilleküla Stadium; Attendance: 2,895; Referee: Tom Owen (Wales)

15 July 2025 Champions League Q1	FK RFS (Latvia)	1–0	(Estonia) FCI Levadia	Riga, Latvia
20:00 UTC+3	Panić 68'	Report		Stadium: LNK Sporta Parks; Attendance: 1,700; Referee: Andrei Chivulete (Romania)

23 July 2025 Conference League Q2	FCI Levadia (Estonia)	1–0	(Georgia (country)) FC Iberia 1999	Tallinn, Estonia
19:30 UTC+3	Agyiri 80'	Report		Stadium: Lilleküla Stadium; Attendance: 1,837; Referee: Jóhan Hendrik Ellefsen (Faroe Islands)

29 July 2025 Conference League Q2	FC Iberia 1999 (Georgia (country))	2–2 (a.e.t.)	(Estonia) FCI Levadia	Tbilisi, Georgia
19:00 UTC+3 (20:00 UTC+4)	Peetson 40' (o.g.); Agyakwa 87'	Report	48' Torres; 109' Kirss	Stadium: Mikheil Meskhi Stadium; Attendance: 2,503; Referee: Jasmin Sabotic (Luxembourg)

7 August 2025 Conference League Q3	Differdange 03 (Luxembourg)	2–3	(Estonia) FCI Levadia	Differdange, Luxembourg
21:00 UTC+3 (20:00 UTC+2)	Hadji 17', 60'	Report	14', 52' Musaba; 20' Ainsalu	Stadium: Stade Municipal de la Ville de Differdange; Attendance: 1,637; Referee: Alessandro Dudic (Switzerland)

14 August 2025 Conference League Q3	FCI Levadia (Estonia)	1–3 (a.e.t.)	(Luxembourg) Differdange 03	Tallinn, Estonia
19:30 UTC+3	Tambedou 92'	Report	89', 105+2' Buch; 119' (pen.) Hadji	Stadium: Lilleküla Stadium; Attendance: 4,063; Referee: Antoni Bandić (Bosnia and Herzegovina)

===== Nõmme Kalju FC =====
10 July 2025 Conference League Q1	Nõmme Kalju FC (Estonia)	1–1	(Albania) FK Partizani Tirana	Tallinn, Estonia
19:45 UTC+3	Männilaan 47'	Report	51' Skuka	Stadium: Kadriorg Stadium (Note: Nõmme Kalju will play their home match at Kadriorg Stadium, instead of their regular stadium, Hiiu Stadium, which did not meet UEFA requirements.); Attendance: 1,121; Referee: Ross Hardie (Scotland)

17 July 2025 Conference League Q1	FK Partizani Tirana (Albania)	0–1 (a.e.t.)	(Estonia) Nõmme Kalju FC	Tirana, Albania
21:00 UTC+3		Report	104' Ivanov	Stadium: Arena Kombëtare (Note: Partizani played their home match at the Arena Kombëtare, instead of their regular stadium, the Arena e Demave, which did not meet UEFA requirements.); Attendance: 3,669; Referee: Trustin Farrugia Cann (Malta)

24 July 2025 Conference League Q2	St Patrick's Athletic F.C. (Republic of Ireland)	1–0	(Estonia) Nõmme Kalju FC	Dublin, Ireland
21:45 UTC+3 (19:45 UTC+1)	Forrester 90'	Report		Stadium: Richmond Park; Attendance: 2,330; Referee: Ladislav Szikszay (Czech Republic)

31 July 2025 Conference League Q2	Nõmme Kalju FC (Estonia)	2–2 (a.e.t.)	(Republic of Ireland) St Patrick's Athletic F.C.	Tallinn, Estonia
19:45 UTC+3	Patrikejevs 43'; Männilaan 49'	Report	90+1' Redmond; 93' Mulraney	Stadium: Lilleküla Stadium (Note: Nõmme Kalju played their Second Round home match at Lilleküla Stadium, instead of their regular stadium, Hiiu Stadium, which did not meet UEFA requirements.); Attendance: 2,866; Referee: Menelaos Antoniou (Cyprus)

===== Paide Linnameeskond =====
10 July 2025 Conference League Q1	F.C. Bruno's Magpies (Gibraltar)	2–3	(Estonia) Paide Linnameeskond	Gibraltar
18:00 UTC+3	Britto 38'; Del Rio 54'	Report	8', 90+8' (pen.) Saarma; 43' Miller	Stadium: Europa Sports Park (Note: Teams from Gibraltar will play their home matches at Europa Sports Park, instead of the Victoria Stadium, due to renovation works.); Attendance: 425; Referee: Paul Mclaughlin (Republic of Ireland)

17 July 2025 Conference League Q1	Paide Linnameeskond (Estonia)	4–1	(Gibraltar) F.C. Bruno's Magpies	Pärnu, Estonia
19:30 UTC+3	Miller 36'; Corr 66', 71'; Cham 89'	Report	76' Del Rio	Stadium: Pärnu Rannastaadion (Note: Paide will play their home match at the Pärnu Rannastaadion in Pärnu, instead of their regular stadium, Paide linnastaadion, in Paide, which did not meet UEFA requirements.); Attendance: 1,223; Referee: Klym Zabroda (Ukraine)

24 July 2025 Conference League Q2	Paide Linnameeskond (Estonia)	0–2	(Sweden) AIK Fotboll	Tallinn, Estonia
19:30 UTC+3		Report	7' Celina; 68' Csongvai	Stadium: Kadriorg Stadium; Attendance: 3,286; Referee: Joni Hyytiä (Finland)

31 July 2025 Conference League Q2	AIK Fotboll (Sweden)	6–0	(Estonia) Paide Linnameeskond	Stockholm, Sweden
20:00 UTC+3 (19:00 UTC+2)	Baranov 16' (o.g.); Miller 24' (o.g.); Hove 45', 54'; Salétros 50' (pen.), 76'	Report		Stadium: Strawberry Arena; Attendance: 16,374; Referee: Helgi Mikael Jónasson (Iceland)

===== FC Flora =====
10 July 2025 Conference League Q1	Valur (Iceland)	3–0	(Estonia) FC Flora	Reykjavík, Iceland
23:00 UTC+3	Magnússon 12', 40'; J. Jónsson 45'	Report		Stadium: Hlíðarendi; Attendance: 981; Referee: Marius Hansen Grøtta (Norway)

17 July 2025 Conference League Q1	FC Flora (Estonia)	1–2	(Iceland) Valur	Tallinn, Estonia
19:00 UTC+3	Sappinen 41'	Report	29' Haraldsson; 90+3' J. Jónsson	Stadium: Lilleküla Stadium; Attendance: 1,002; Referee: Oscar Johnson (Sweden)

== Notable transfers ==
Players are listed in an alphabetical order. Players with an "*" behind their name have changed teams inside and outside of Meistriliiga. Player's last team is listed as "free agent" if he has not represented a team in the previous six months. Player's next team is listed as "free agent" if he has not found a new club within the following six months.

=== Inside Meistriliiga ===
Listed are players, who have joined or left a club participating in the 2025 Meistriliiga. The player must have represented the Estonian national team at least once. The list may also contain more known players, who have either changed their club inside the lower leagues or retired from football.

Name	Pos.	Age	From	To	Date	Notes	Ref
Mihkel Aksalu	GK	40	Paide Linnameeskond	retired	01.01	Contract with Paide ended. Decided to retire	
Henri Anier	FW	34	(Hong Kong) Lee Man FC	Paide Linnameeskond	07.07	Contract with Lee Man ended. Signed a 2.5 year contract with Paide	
Andre Frolov	MF	36	Paide Linnameeskond	FC Nõmme United	01.01	Contract with Paide ended. Signed a 1-year contract with Nõmme United	
Henri Järvelaid	DF	25	Tallinna FCI Levadia	Tartu JK Tammeka	29.07	Signed a 0.5 year loan deal with Tammeka	
Ragnar Klavan	DF	39	JK Tallinna Kalev	retired	01.01	Contract with Kalev ended. Decided to retire	
Marko Lipp	DF	25	FC Kuressaare	Pärnu JK Vaprus	02.01	Signed a 1-year contract with Vaprus.	
Marko Meerits	GK	32	FC Nõmme United	Paide Linnameeskond	01.01	Signed a 2-year contract with Paide.	
Karl-Romet Nõmm	GK	26	Viimsi JK	FC Kuressaare	01.01	Signed a 1-year contract with Kuressaare.	
Sten Reinkort	FW	26	free agent	Paide Linnameeskond	01.01	Signed a 2-year contract with Paide.	
Konstantin Vassiljev	MF	40	FC Flora	retired	01.01	Contract with Flora ended. Decided to retire	
Nikita Vassiljev	MF	22	(Slovakia) FC ŠTK 1914 Šamorín	Tallinna FCI Levadia	30.06	Loan deal with Šamorín ended.	
Nikita Vassiljev	MF	22	Tallinna FCI Levadia	FC Nõmme United	03.07	Signed a 0.5 year contract with United.	
Karl Rudolf Õigus	MF	26	FC Kuressaare	retired	01.01	Contract with Kuressaare ended. Decided to retire	

=== Outside Meistriliiga ===
Listed are all Estonian footballers, who have joined or left a foreign team.

Name	Pos.	Age	From	To	Date	Notes	Ref
Oliver Cekredzi	MF	20	Tallinna FC Flora	(Sweden) IFK Haninge	08.07	Contract with Flora ended. Signed a contract with Haninge.	
Karl Jakob Hein	GK	23	(Spain) Real Valladolid	(England) Arsenal F.C.	30.06	Loan deal ended.	
Karl Jakob Hein	GK	23	(England) Arsenal F.C.	(Germany) SV Werder Bremen	22.08	Signed a 1-year loan deal with Bremen.	
Matvei Igonen	GK	28	(Bulgaria) Botev Plovdiv	(Sweden) Degerfors IF	17.07	Signed a 0.5 year contract with Degerfors IF.	
Dimitri Jepihhin	FW	19	Paide Linnameeskond	(Slovakia) AS Trenčín	21.02	Sold to Trenčín and signed a 2.5 year contract.	
Nikita Komissarov	MF	24	Nõmme Kalju FC	(Lithuania) FA Šiauliai	29.01	Contract with Kalju ended. Signed a 1-year contract with Šiauliai.	
Vladislav Kreida	MF	25	Tallinna FC Flora	(Czech Republic) SK Sigma Olomouc	04.01	Signed a 0.5+2.5 year contract with Sigma.	
Patrik Kristal	MF	17	Paide Linnameeskond	(Germany) 1. FC Köln II	01.01	Signed a 2.5 year contract with Köln II.	
Johann Kõre	MF	21	Viimsi JK	(Iceland) Reynir Sandgerði	05.08	Signed a contract with Reynir Sandgerði.	
Kristofer Käit	MF	19	JK Tallinna Kalev	(Portugal) Portimonense S.C. U23	02.01	Signed a 1.5 year contract with Portimonense.	
Mattias Käit	MF	27	(Romania) FC Rapid București	(Switzerland) FC Thun	15.07	Sold to Thun and signed a 2+1 year contract.	
Martin Käos	DF	26	Pärnu JK Vaprus	(Italy) AS Lodigiani	16.01	Signed a contract with Lodigiani.	
Aleksandr Lohmatov	FW	18	(Italy) Torino FC Youth Sector	(Italy) Frosinone Calcio U23	23.07	Signed a contract with Frosinone.	
Kaarel Mustmaa	FW	19	(Portugal) S.L. Benfica B	(Greece) PAOK B	02.08	Signed a 3-year contract with PAOK B.	
Mattias Männilaan	FW	23	FC Kuressaare	(Gibraltar) Lincoln Red Imps F.C.	08.01	Signed a 0.5+1 year contract with Lincoln Red Imps.	
Kevor Palumets	MF	22	(Belgium) SV Zulte Waregem	(Slovakia) FK Železiarne Podbrezová	25.01	Signed a 2.5 year contract.	
Daniil Pareiko	GK	20	(Italy) Casertana FC	(Italy) L'Aquila 1927	21.07	Signed a 1-year contract with L'Aquila 1927.	
Maksim Paskotši	DF	22	(Switzerland) Grasshopper Club Zürich	(Belgium) K.A.A. Gent	04.08	Sold to Gent and signed a 4-year contract.	
Robi Saarma	FW	24	Paide Linnameeskond	(Czech Republic) FK Pardubice	22.07	Sold to Pardubice and signed a contract.	
Rocco Robert Shein	MF	21	(Netherlands) FC Dordrecht	(Norway) Fredrikstad FK	03.02	Sold and signed a 3.5 year contract.	
Vlasiy Sinyavskiy	FW	28	(Czech Republic) 1. FC Slovácko	(Czech Republic) Bohemians 1905	01.07	Contract with Slovácko ended. Signed a contract with Bohemians 1905.	
Markus Soomets	MF	24	Tallinna FC Flora	(Netherlands) FC Den Bosch	01.01	Signed a 1.5+1 year contract with Den Bosch.	
German Šlein	MF	28	JK Narva Trans	(Serbia) FK Smederevo 1924	18.01	Signed a contract with Smederevo.	
Alex Matthias Tamm	FW	23	Nõmme Kalju FC	(Slovenia) NK Olimpija Ljubljana	08.01	Signed a 2.5 year contract with Olimpija.	
Joonas Tamm	DF	33	(Bulgaria) Botev Plovdiv	(Romania) Sepsi OSK Sfântu Gheorghe	03.07	Signed a 1+1 year contract.	
Tony Varjund	FW	17	Tallinna FC Flora	(Netherlands) Jong FC Utrecht	23.01	Signed a 1.5 year loan deal with option to buy.	
Bogdan Vaštšuk	MF	29	(Kuwait) Al-Shabab SC	(Slovenia) FC Koper	31.07	Contract with Al-Shabab ended. Signed a 1-year contract with FC Koper.	
Martin Vetkal	MF	21	(Sweden) IF Brommapojkarna	(Netherlands) FC Dordrecht	18.07	Signed a 3-year contract with FC Dordrecht.	
Ioan Yakovlev	FW	26	Tallinna FCI Levadia	(Greece) Panionios F.C.	01.01	Signed a 2.5 year contract with Panionios.	

=== Foreign players ===
Listed are all foreign players that have joined or left a team participating in the 2025 Meistriliiga.

Name	Pos.	Age	From	To	Date	Notes	Ref
(Ghana) Thomas Agyepong	FW	28	Paide Linnameeskond	free agent	01.01	Contract with Paide ended.	
(Ghana) Ernest Agyiri	FW	26	(Denmark) Randers FC	FCI Levadia	03.02	Signed a 1-year loan deal with Levadia.	
(The Gambia) Abdourahman Badamosi	FW	18	(The Gambia) Real de Banjul	Paide Linnameeskond	28.01	Signed a 3-year contract with Paide.	
(Nigeria) Ahmed Adebayo Basher	FW	23	Tartu JK Tammeka	(Norway) IK Start	03.08	Sold to Start and signed a 3.5-year contract.	
(The Gambia) Abdoulie Ceesay	FW	20	(The Gambia) Real de Banjul	Paide Linnameeskond	01.01	Signed a contract with Paide.	
(The Gambia) Abdoulie Ceesay	FW	20	Paide Linnameeskond	(Germany) FC St. Pauli	03.01	Signed a contract with St. Pauli.	
(The Gambia) Pa Assan Corr	FW	19	(The Gambia) Real de Banjul	Paide Linnameeskond	28.01	Signed a 3-year contract with Paide.	
(The Gambia) Pa Assan Corr	FW	19	Paide Linnameeskond	(Slovakia) FC DAC 1904 Dunajská Streda	08.09	Sold to DAC and signed a 4-year contract.	
(Bosnia and Herzegovina) Drazen Dubackic	DF	25	(Bosnia and Herzegovina) FK Sloboda Tuzla	Paide Linnameeskond	17.01	Signed a 1-year contract with Paide.	
(Bosnia and Herzegovina) Drazen Dubackic	DF	26	Paide Linnameeskond	JK Tallinna Kalev	22.08	Signed a 0.5-year loan deal with Kalev.	
(Canada) Habib Famuditimi	MF	24	(Albania) KS Turbina Cërrik	JK Tallinna Kalev	14.01	Signed a 1-year contract with Kalev.	
(Mali) Bourama Fomba	DF	25	FCI Levadia	(Cyprus) Omonia Aradippou	30.01	Contract with Levadia ended. Signed a contract with Omonia	
(Nigeria) Luqman Gilmore	MF	28	(Armenia) FC Urartu	Paide Linnameeskond	28.02	Signed a 1-year contract with Paide.	
(Nigeria) Victory Iboro	DF	20	(Nigeria) Beyond Limits FA	FCI Levadia	21.02	Signed a 1-year contract with Levadia.	
(The Gambia) Momodou Jallow	DF	20	(The Gambia) Steve Biko FC	JK Tallinna Kalev	04.03	Signed a 1-year contract with Kalev.	
(Burkina Faso) Pierre Landry Kaboré	FW	24	JK Narva Trans	(Scotland) Heart of Midlothian F.C.	06.08	Sold to Hearts and signed a 3-year contract.	
(Serbia) Predrag Medic	MF	26	Paide Linnameeskond	free agent	25.01	Contract with Paide terminated.	
(Nigeria) Ganiu Atanda Ogungbe	DF	32	(Bangladesh) Sheikh Russel KC	Tartu JK Tammeka	21.02	Signed a 1-year contract with Tammeka.	
(Ghana) Enock Otoo	FW	20	(Denmark) Lyngby BK	FCI Levadia	06.01	Signed a 1-year contract with Levadia.	
(Brazil) Guilherme Smith	FW	22	Tallinna FCI Levadia	(Belgium) Royale Union Saint-Gilloise	12.08	Sold to USG and signed a 4+1-year contract.	
(Canada) Zachary Sukunda	MF	29	(Canada) Valour FC	JK Tallinna Kalev	16.01	Signed a 1-year contract with Kalev.	
(The Gambia) Muhammed Suso	FW	19	Paide Linnameeskond	(Czech Republic) FK Pardubice	08.09	Sold to Pardubice.	
(The Gambia) Bubacarr Tambedou	FW	22	(Georgia (country)) FC Dinamo Batumi	FCI Levadia	03.01	Signed a 1-year contract with Levadia.	
(The Gambia) Bubacarr Trawally	FW	30	free agent	Paide Linnameeskond	12.09	Signed a 0.5-year loan deal with Paide.	

=== Managerial changes ===
Listed are all clubs, who play in the top divisions (Meistriliiga, Esiliiga, Esiliiga B), and national teams who changed managers after the end of the 2024 season.
