= 2027 UEFA European Under-21 Championship qualification Group C =

Football tournament qualification stage

Group C of the 2027 UEFA European Under-21 Championship qualifying competition consists of six teams: France, Switzerland, Iceland, Faroe Islands, Luxembourg, and Estonia. The composition of the nine groups in the qualifying group stage was decided by the draw held on 6 February 2025 at the UEFA headquarters in Nyon, Switzerland, with the teams seeded according to their coefficient ranking.

== Standings ==
Pos	Team	Pld	W	D	L	GF	GA	GD	Pts	Qualification	France	Iceland	Switzerland	Faroe Islands	Luxembourg	Estonia
1	France	10	8	2	0	34	8	+26	26	Final tournament	—	2–1	7–1	1–0	3–2	6–1
2	Iceland	10	5	3	2	22	11	+11	18	Play-offs	1–1	—	5–1	1–2	2–1	6–2
3	Switzerland	10	5	2	3	17	17	0	17		1–1	0–0	—	1–0	5–0	2–1
4	Faroe Islands	10	4	0	6	8	17	−9	12		0–6	0–2	1–3	—	0–1	2–1
5	Luxembourg	10	3	1	6	13	22	−9	10		1–5	1–3	2–1	0–1	—	3–0
6	Estonia	10	0	2	8	9	28	−19	2		0–2	1–1	0–2	1–2	2–2	—

Source: UEFA
Rules for classification: Tiebreakers

== Matches ==
Times are CET/CEST, (Note: CEST (UTC+2) for matches until 26 October 2025 and from 29 March 2026 (matchday 1–3 and 7–10), and CET (UTC+1) for matches from 26 October 2025 to 29 March 2026 (matchday 4–6).) as listed by UEFA (local times, if different, are in parentheses).

7 June 2025
19:00 (18:00 UTC+1)

Faroe Islands	2–1	Estonia
Josephsen 73'; Samuelsen 90+3' (pen.)	Report	Siht 50'

Við Djúpumýrar, Klaksvík
Attendance: 268
Referee: Mehmet Türkmen (Turkey)

4 September 2025
19:00 (17:00 UTC+00:00)

Iceland	1–2	Faroe Islands
Sørensen 62' (o.g.)	Report	Hellisdal 3'; Samuelsen 16'

Valbjarnarvöllur, Reykjavík
Attendance: 210
Referee: Ross Hardie (Scotland)
5 September 2025
18:00 (19:00 UTC+3)

Estonia	0–2	Switzerland
	Report	Vogt 9'; Konietzke 90'

Kadriorg Stadium, Tallinn
Attendance: 354
Referee: Igor Bosca (Moldova)

8 September 2025
18:00 (19:00 UTC+3)

Estonia	1–1	Iceland
Pajo 39'	Report	Andrésson 87'

Kadriorg Stadium, Tallinn
Attendance: 286
Referee: Mikkel Redder (Denmark)
9 September 2025
19:30

Luxembourg	0–1	Faroe Islands
	Report	Reynheim 26'

Stade de la Frontière, Esch-sur-Alzette
Attendance: 405
Referee: Kevin O'Sullivan (Ireland)

10 October 2025
18:00 (19:00 UTC+3)

Estonia	2–2	Luxembourg
Siht 31'; Agaptšev 59'	Report	Lohei 8'; Duarte 70' (pen.)

Kadriorg Stadium, Tallinn
Attendance: 247
Referee: Dmytro Panchyshyn (Ukraine)
10 October 2025
18:00 (17:00 UTC+1)

Faroe Islands	0–6	France
	Report	Odobert 13'; Methalie 22', 57'; Tel 38' (pen.); Bahoya 51'; Bouaddi 67'

Við Djúpumýrar, Klaksvík
Attendance: 798
Referee: Peiman Simani (Finland)
10 October 2025
18:30

Switzerland	0–0	Iceland
	Report

Swissporarena, Lucerne
Attendance: 4,121
Referee: Danilo Nikolić (Serbia)

13 October 2025
18:30

France	6–1	Estonia
Tel 9'; Cissé 12'; Kroupi 49', 86'; Odobert 64', 79'	Report	Varjund 45+3'

Stade des Alpes, Grenoble
Attendance: 4,191
Referee: Jakob Semler (Austria)
14 October 2025
17:00 (15:00 UTC+00:00)

Iceland	2–1	Luxembourg
Andrésson 28'; Bjarnason 61'	Report	Videira 37'

Valbjarnarvöllur, Reykjavík
Attendance: 242
Referee: Ben Mcmaster (Northern Ireland)
14 October 2025
19:00 (18:00 UTC+1)

Faroe Islands	1–3	Switzerland
Josephsen 77'	Report	Kacuri 21'; Chipperfield 78'; Bajrami 83'

Tórsvøllur, Tórshavn
Attendance: 480
Referee: Iwan Arwel Griffith (Wales)

13 November 2025
19:30

Luxembourg	1–3	Iceland
Gonçalves 50'	Report	Þorsteinsson 15'; Haraldsson 26'; Guðmundsson 52'

Stade Émile Mayrisch, Esch-sur-Alzette
Attendance: 481
Referee: Aleko Aptsiauri (Georgia)
14 November 2025
19:30

Switzerland	1–1	France
Vogt 38'	Report	Junior Kroupi 66'

Stade de la Tuilière, Lausanne
Attendance: 5,021
Referee: Ishmael Barbara (Malta)

17 November 2025
21:00

France	1–0	Faroe Islands
Tel 37' (pen.)	Report

Stade des Alpes, Grenoble
Attendance: 2,421
Referee: Igor Boşca (Moldova)
18 November 2025
19:30

Luxembourg	2–1	Switzerland
Tavares 70'; May 86' (o.g.)	Report	Meichtry 66'

Stade de la Frontière, Esch-sur-Alzette
Attendance: 349
Referee: Tim Marshall (Northern Ireland)

26 March 2026
17:00 (16:00 UTC+0)

Iceland	6–2	Estonia
Guðjohnsen 2', 56'; Daðason 45+2', 51'; Mikaelsson 73'; Ingason 79'	Report	Kriis 35'; Sillamaa 90+2'

Valbjarnarvöllur, Reykjavík
Attendance: 250
Referee: Marius Hansen Grøtta (Norway)
26 March 2026
19:30

Luxembourg	1–5	France
Gonçalves 78'	Report	Zézé 2'; Ngoura 14' (pen.); Atangana 19'; Fofana 89', 90+2'

Stade Municipal de la Ville de Differdange, Differdange
Attendance: 1,783
Referee: Matthias Jöllenbeck (Germany)
27 March 2026
20:00

Switzerland	1–0	Faroe Islands
Boteli 77'	Report

Stockhorn Arena, Thun
Attendance: 2,121
Referee: Visar Kastrati (Kosovo)

30 March 2026
19:00

France	2–1	Iceland
Lebreton 10'; Zeze 29'	Report	Guðjohnsen 24' (pen.)

Stade de l'Abbé-Deschamps, Auxerre
Attendance: 4,127
Referee: Mervan Bejtullahu (Kosovo)
31 March 2026
20:00

Switzerland	2–1	Estonia
Boteli 8'; Tsawa 65'	Report	Orlov 36'

Stockhorn Arena, Thun
Attendance: 1,212
Referee: Rob Harvey (Ireland)

25 September 2026
17:00 (15:00 UTC+0)

Iceland	1–1	France
Guðjohnsen 52'	Report	Tel 31'

Þróttarvöllur, Reykjavík
Attendance: 912
Referee: Luca Zufferli (Italy)
25 September 2026
18:00 (19:00 UTC+3)

Estonia	1–2	Faroe Islands
Pajo 80' (pen.)	Report	Benjaminsen 54', 66'

Pärnu Rannastaadion, Pärnu
Attendance: 321
Referee: Kristaps Ratnieks (Latvia)
25 September 2026
19:30

Switzerland	5−0	Luxembourg
Chipperfield 15', 17' (pen.); Vogt 34'; Bajrami 82', 90'	Report

AIL Arena, Lugano
Attendance: 3,424
Referee: Alex Johnson (Malta)

29 September 2026
17:00 (15:00 UTC+0)

Iceland	5–1	Switzerland
Guðjohnsen 11', 79'; Andrésson 45'; Aronsson 62'; Mikaelsson 86'	Report	Bajrami 46'

Þróttarvöllur, Reykjavík
Attendance: 341
Referee: Jakob Semler (Austria)
29 September 2026
18:00 (19:00 UTC+3)

Estonia	0–2	France
	Report	Ngoura 24'; Bahoya 68'

Pärnu Rannastaadion, Pärnu
Attendance: 1,220
Referee: Pavle Ilić (Serbia)
30 September 2026
18:00 (17:00 UTC+1)

Faroe Islands	0–1	Luxembourg
	Report	Elshan 76'

Við Djúpumýrar, Klaksvík
Attendance: 212
Referee: Vilius Paulauskas (Lithuania)

3 October 2026 (Note: Match originally to be played on 5 September 2025 and postponed due to a bus accident involving the Luxembourg national team.)
19:00

France	3–2	Luxembourg
Ngoura 10', 25'; Tel 76'	Report	Englaro 52', 68' (pen.)

Stade de la Source, Orléans
Attendance: 4,410
Referee: Henrik Nalbandyan (Armenia)

6 October 2026
19:00

Luxembourg	3–0	Estonia
Tavares 30'; Thelen 90'; Englaro 90+3'	Report

Stade de la Frontière, Esch-sur-Alzette
Attendance: 280
Referee: Giorgi Avazashvili (Georgia)
6 October 2026
19:00

France	7–1	Switzerland
Tel 10', 40', 59'; Lebreton 14'; Assoumani 51'; Ngoura 64'; Danois 90+1'	Report	Chipperfield 53'

Stade de la Source, Orléans
Attendance: 3,234
Referee: Szabolcs Kovacs (Romania)
6 October 2026
19:00 (18:00 UTC+1)

Faroe Islands	0–2	Iceland
	Report	Andrésson 15'; Guðjohnsen 17'

Tórsvøllur, Tórshavn
Attendance: 307
Referee: Matthew De Gabriele (Malta)

== Goalscorers ==
There were 103 goals scored in 30 matches, for an average of 3.43 goals per match.

8 goals

- (France national under-21 football team) Mathys Tel

7 goals

- (Iceland national under-21 football team) Daníel Guðjohnsen

5 goals

- (France national under-21 football team) Steve Ngoura

4 goals

- (Iceland national under-21 football team) Benoný Andrésson
- (Switzerland national under-21 football team) Labinot Bajrami
- (Switzerland national under-21 football team) Liam Chipperfield

3 goals

- (France national under-21 football team) Eli Junior Kroupi
- (France national under-21 football team) Wilson Odobert
- (Luxembourg national under-21 football team) Ivan Englaro
- (Switzerland national under-21 football team) Alessandro Vogt

2 goals

- (Estonia national under-21 football team) Tristan Pajo
- (Estonia national under-21 football team) Rommi Siht
- (Faroe Islands national under-21 football team) Aron Benjaminsen
- (Faroe Islands national under-21 football team) Johan Josephsen
- (Faroe Islands national under-21 football team) Áki Samuelsen
- (France national under-21 football team) Jean-Mattéo Bahoya
- (France national under-21 football team) Rayan Fofana
- (France national under-21 football team) Noé Lebreton
- (France national under-21 football team) Dayann Methalie
- (France national under-21 football team) Nathan Zézé
- (Iceland national under-21 football team) Viktor Daðason
- (Iceland national under-21 football team) Hilmir Mikaelsson
- (Luxembourg national under-21 football team) Miguel Gonçalves
- (Luxembourg national under-21 football team) Helmer Tavares
- (Switzerland national under-21 football team) Winsley Boteli

1 goal

- (Estonia national under-21 football team) Stanislav Agaptšev
- (Estonia national under-21 football team) Kristjan Kriis
- (Estonia national under-21 football team) Mihhail Orlov
- (Estonia national under-21 football team) Ramol Sillamaa
- (Estonia national under-21 football team) Tony Varjund
- (Faroe Islands national under-21 football team) Mattias Hellisdal
- (Faroe Islands national under-21 football team) Dávid Reynheim
- (France national under-21 football team) Valentin Atangana
- (France national under-21 football team) Ayyoub Bouaddi
- (France national under-21 football team) Djaoui Cissé
- (France national under-21 football team) Kévin Danois
- (France national under-21 football team) Dehmaine Tabibou
- (Iceland national under-21 football team) Haukur Andri Haraldsson
- (Iceland national under-21 football team) Eggert Aron Guðmundsson
- (Iceland national under-21 football team) Helgi Fróði Ingason
- (Iceland national under-21 football team) David Helgi Aronsson
- (Iceland national under-21 football team) Jóhannes Kristinn Bjarnason
- (Iceland national under-21 football team) Ágúst Orri Þorsteinsson
- (Luxembourg national under-21 football team) Diego Duarte
- (Luxembourg national under-21 football team) Leon Elshan
- (Luxembourg national under-21 football team) Fabio Lohei
- (Luxembourg national under-21 football team) Cyrill May
- (Luxembourg national under-21 football team) Eliot Thelen
- (Luxembourg national under-21 football team) Jayson Videira
- (Switzerland national under-21 football team) Dion Kacuri
- (Switzerland national under-21 football team) Corsin Konietzke
- (Switzerland national under-21 football team) Ethan Meichtry
- (Switzerland national under-21 football team) Cheveyo Tsawa

1 own goal

- (Faroe Islands national under-21 football team) Heini Sørensen (against Iceland)
