= Albania national under-21 football team =

National association football team

Albania Under-21
- Nickname(s): Kuqezinjtë (The Red and Blacks); Shpresat e Shqipërisë (Albania's Hopes)
- Association: Federata Shqiptare e Futbollit (FSHF)
- Confederation: UEFA (Europe)
- Head coach: Alban Bushi
- Captain: Feta Fetai
- Most caps: Shaqir Tafa (24)
- Top scorer: Odise Roshi (11)
- Home stadium: Elbasan Arena; Loro Boriçi Stadium
- FIFA code: ALB
First colours	Second colours	Third colours

First international
- Yugoslavia 1–0 Albania (Thessaloniki, Greece; 25 June 1976)

Biggest win
- Albania 7–1 Romania (Tirana, Albania; April 12, 1978)

Biggest defeat
- Germany 8–0 Albania (Cologne, Germany; March 23, 2001)

UEFA U-21 Championship
- Appearances: 2 (first in 1984)
- Best result: Quarter-finals, 1984
Medal record
Albania national under-21 football team
Medal record
U-21 Balkan Youth Championship
Gold medal – first place	1976–1978	Team
Gold medal – first place	1981	Team

The Albania national under-21 football team represents Albania in men's under-21 international football and is governed by the Football Association of Albania (Federata Shqiptare e Futbollit, FSHF). The team competes in the UEFA European Under-21 Championship, held biennially, and also plays friendly and qualifying fixtures throughout the year. The team is nicknamed Kuqezinjtë ("The Red and Blacks") and Shpresat e Shqipërisë ("Albania's Hopes"). Home matches are typically played at Elbasan Arena or the Loro Boriçi Stadium in Shkodër.

== History ==
=== Balkan Youth Championship ===
Albania Under-21 participated in the Balkan Youth Championship as the successor to the Albania under-23 team, competing in the 1976–78 and 1981 editions. The team won both tournaments, defeating Romania and Bulgaria respectively in the finals. In the 1978 edition, the second leg of the final against Romania ended in a 7–1 victory for Albania, which remains the team's largest win in its history.

=== 1984 UEFA European Under-21 Football Championship ===
Albania made its debut in UEFA European Under-21 Championship during the 1984 competition, qualifying for the tournament for the first and, to date, only time. This historic event was the first time a team from Albania qualified for a Europe or World Championship. In the qualifying stage they played against West Germany, Turkey and Austria. Albania U21 managed to qualify without any loss winning both home-away versus Austria (1–2 away & 3–0 home) & Turkey (both 1–0) and managing two draws against West Germany (both 1–1), heading the group with 10 points, 1 above West Germany. Albania played the quarter finals against Italy, against which it lost twice 0–1 both home and away as Italy advanced to the semifinals losing against England, the eventual champions.

=== 1986–1994 ===
In the 1986 UEFA European Under-21 Football Championship Albania came last in group after Poland and Greece, and could not qualify. In the 1988 UEFA European Under-21 Football Championship Albania came again last in group after Spain, Romania and Austria. In the 1990 UEFA European Under-21 Football Championship Albania came last in group after Sweden, England and Poland. In the 1992 UEFA European Under-21 Football Championship managed to precede Iceland as last in the group, but was preceded by Czechoslovakia, France and Spain. In the qualifiers of the 1994 UEFA European Under-21 Football Championship Albania preceded bottom team Republic of Ireland, but was preceded by Spain, Germany and Denmark.

=== 1996–2002 ===
In the 1996 UEFA European Under-21 Football Championship qualification Albania did not participate. In the qualifiers of the 1998 UEFA European Under-21 Football Championship Albania left behind Armenia, but had to trail in the final rankings Germany, Ukraine, and Portugal. In the qualifiers of the 2000 UEFA European Under-21 Football Championship Albania trailed Greece, Norway, Georgia, Latvia, and Slovenia and closed at the bottom of the group. In the qualifiers of the 2002 UEFA European Under-21 Football Championship Albania came again last behind England, Greece, Germany, and Finland.

=== 2004–2007 ===
In the qualifiers of the 2004 UEFA European Under-21 Football Championship Albania had the best result since Euro '84, when it had won the group, as it left two teams behind (Republic of Ireland and Georgia), but was preceded by Switzerland and Russia, and thus failed to qualify to the main tournament. In the qualifiers of the 2006 UEFA European Under-21 Football Championship Albania left behind itself Kazakhstan, but was preceded by Denmark, Ukraine, Greece, Turkey, and Georgia. In the qualifiers of the 2007 UEFA European Under-21 Football Championship, in a 3 teams group, Albania came last behind Spain and Slovakia and failed to qualify.

=== 2009–2013 ===
In the qualifiers of the 2009 UEFA European Under-21 Football Championship Albania was fourth out of 6 teams in the final ranking, leaving behind the Faroe Islands and Azerbaijan, but trailing behind Italy, Croatia and Greece. In the qualifiers of the 2011 UEFA European Under-21 Football Championship Albania left again behind Azerbaijan but trailed Scotland, Belarus, and Austria in the final rankings. In the qualifiers of the 2013 UEFA European Under-21 Football Championship Albania came last trailing behind Russia, Portugal, Poland, and Moldova. However, as a consolation for the first time an Albanian footballer, Armando Sadiku was the top goalscorer of the group. Albania drew in Russia against the famous hosts during that tournament, a noticeable fact. Albania were also able to draw against Portugal in Durrës with 2–2 during this qualifying. Albania suffered close losses against Poland in Grudziądz with 4–3 and to Russia with 0–1 in Durrës respectively.

=== 2015–2019 ===
In the qualification in Group 4 Albania would finish in last place. They were able to beat Hungary with 0–2 away from home. Albania would also beat notable Austria with 1–3 away from home in the Merkur-Arena(Liebenaur Stadium) in Graz. As a fact Albanian won for the first time in their history more matches away than at home in an Under-21 qualification. In the following 2017 UEFA European Under-21 Championship qualification Group 4. Albania finished fourth leaving Hungary and Liechtenstein but trailing behind Greece, Israel and eventual Group winners Portugal. securing 12 points in the progress. Albania were able to win three matches in this qualifying. They beat Liechtenstein with 2-0 and away from home with the same result. As well as beating Hungary in Elbasan with 2–1 in fact. They drew three times once against Israel in Elbasan with 1-1 and away to Hungary with 2-2 and in the derby at home against Greece with 0:0.

== Competitive record ==
=== UEFA European Under-23/21 Championship ===
The event was classified as a U-23/21 tournament where at time were played three competitions, 1972, 1974 & 1976.

UEFA European Under-21 Championship record									UEFA European Under-21 Championship qualification record					
Year	Round	Position	Pld	W	D *	L	GF	GA	Pld	W	D	L	GF	GA
(Europe) 1978	Did not enter								did not enter					
(Europe) 1980	Did not enter								did not enter					
(Europe) 1982	Did not enter								did not enter					
(Europe) 1984	Quarter-finals	6th	2	0	0	2	0	2	6	4	2	0	9	3
(Europe) 1986	Did not qualify								4	1	0	3	3	7
(Europe) 1988	Did not qualify								6	0	2	4	4	10
(Europe) 1990	Did not qualify								6	0	1	5	1	8
(Europe) 1992	Did not qualify								7	1	2	4	3	13
(France) 1994	Did not qualify								8	1	2	5	5	18
(Spain) 1996	Did not qualify								did not enter					
(Romania) 1998	Did not qualify								8	1	1	6	6	19
(Slovakia) 2000	Did not qualify								10	1	4	5	8	21
(Switzerland) 2002	Did not qualify								8	1	1	6	3	19
(Germany) 2004	Did not qualify								8	3	1	4	10	10
(Portugal) 2006	Did not qualify								12	2	3	7	9	27
(Netherlands) 2007	Did not qualify								2	0	1	1	0	3
(Sweden) 2009	Did not qualify								10	3	3	4	10	13
(Denmark) 2011	Did not qualify								8	1	1	6	11	20
(Israel) 2013	Did not qualify								8	1	2	5	11	18
(Czech Republic) 2015	Did not qualify								8	2	0	6	7	15
(Poland) 2017	Did not qualify								10	3	3	4	11	20
(Italy) 2019	Did not qualify								10	1	4	5	9	17
(Slovenia) (Hungary) 2021	Did not qualify								10	4	2	4	16	21
(Romania) (Georgia (country)) 2023	Did not qualify								10	3	1	6	9	17
(Slovakia) 2025	Did not qualify								10	5	1	4	12	17
(Albania) (Serbia) 2027	Qualified as co-hosts								Qualified as co-hosts					
Total:2/25	Quarter-finals	6th	2	0	0	2	0	2	169	38	37	94	157	316

Note: The year of the tournament represents the year in which it ends.

== Fixtures and results ==
=== 2024 ===
22 March 2024 2025 UEFA Q	Albania	0–0	Finland	Tirana
17:00		Report		Stadium: Arena Kombëtare; Referee: Michal Očenáš (Slovakia)

26 March 2024 2025 UEFA Q	Albania	1–3	Switzerland	Tirana
17:00	Shpendi 90+3'	Report	Surdez 28'; Sanches 59'; Keller 76'	Stadium: Arena Kombëtare; Referee: Adam Ladebäck (Sweden)

7 June 2024 2025 UEFA Q	Montenegro	1–0	Albania	Podgorica
20:00	Franeta 90+2'	Report		Stadium: Podgorica City Stadium; Referee: Jonathan Lardot (Belgium)

11 June 2024 Hybrid friendly	Albania	4–0	Liechtenstein U23	Durrës
19:00	Pajaziti 37' (pen.); Rashica 42'; Maksuti 52'; Kurtulan 90+2' (pen.)	Report		Stadium: Niko Dovana Stadium; Referee: Florjan Lata (Albania)

6 September 2024 2025 UEFA Q	Switzerland	1–2	Albania	Lausanne
19:30	Surdez 16'	Report	Pajaziti 18', 69'	Stadium: Stade de la Tuilière; Referee: Atilla Karaoğlan (Turkey)

15 October 2024 2025 UEFA Q	Albania	1–0	Armenia	Tirana
	Aventisian 57' (o.g.)	Report		Stadium: Arena Kombëtare; Referee: Kyriakos Athanasiou (Cyprus)

15 November 2024 Friendly	Albania	1–1	Moldova	Vorë
	Rashica 10' (pen.)	Report	Costin 79'	Stadium: Vora Stadium

18 November 2024 Friendly	Albania	4–0	Moldova	Vorë
	Rashica 16'; Ismaili 54'; Rama 87'; Daka 90+3'	Report		Stadium: Vora Stadium

=== 2025 ===
21 March 2025 Friendly	Greece	0–0	Albania	Serres
16:00		Report		Stadium: Serres Municipal Stadium

25 March 2025 Friendly	Luxembourg	1–0	Albania	Parc Housen
18:30	Videira 57'	Report		Stadium: Stade Georges Wohlfart

5 June 2025 Friendly	Hungary	1–2	Albania	Kecskemét
19:30	Drágoner 74'	Report	Dodaj 46'; Osmani 76'	Stadium: Széktói Stadion

8 June 2025 Friendly	Turkey	1–0	Albania	Istanbul
19:00	Kılıçsoy 27'	Report		Stadium: Atatürk Olympic Stadium

5 September 2025 Friendly	Albania	0–2	Germany	Elbasan
18:30		Report	Ansah 48'; Pejčinović 52'	Stadium: Elbasan Arena

8 September 2025 Friendly	Switzerland	2–1	Albania	Aarau
18:30	Konietzke 27'; Jukaj 81' (o.g.)	Report	Shehu 62'	Stadium: Stadion Brügglifeld

10 October 2025 Friendly	Albania	2–0	San Marino	Tirana
17:00	Dodaj 21'; Fetai 52'	Report		Stadium: Air Albania Stadium

13 November 2025 Friendly	Moldova	0–1	Albania	Vadul lui Vodă
15:00		Report	Alili 18'	Stadium: Stadionul CPSM

17 November 2025 Friendly	Albania	2–0	Ukraine	Elbasan
18:00	Rashica 38'; Kote 90+5'	Report		Stadium: Elbasan Arena

=== 2026 ===
30 March Friendly	Albania	3–2	Uzbekistan U23	Antalya
	Rashica 17'; Brruti 31', 33'	Report	Fayzullaev 22'; Ibraimov 70'

5 June Friendly	Slovenia	1–1	Albania	Ajdovščina
	Ilenič 56'	Report	Brruti 27' (pen.)	Stadium: Ajdovščina Stadium

8 June Friendly	Italy	1–0	Albania	Fontanafredda
	Calvani 63'			Stadium: Stadio Omero Tognon

22 August 2026 Mediterranean Games	Italy	1–1	Albania	Lecce
21:00	Casagrande 56'	Report	Marinaj 45+4'	Stadium: Stadio Ettore Giardiniero; Referee: Ozan Ergün (Turkey)

24 August 2026 Mediterranean Games	Albania	3–1	Kosovo	Lecce
	Bode 51'; Daja 74'; Leshi 90+2'	Report	Mehmeti 90+4'	Stadium: Stadio Ettore Giardiniero; Referee: Matteo Marchetti (Italy)

26 August 2026 Mediterranean Games	Algeria	2–0	Albania	Francavilla Fontana
	Akhrib 58'; Abdelaziz 73'	Report		Stadium: Stadio Giovanni Paolo II; Referee: Hicham Temsamani (Morocco)

5 October Friendly	Ukraine	2–2	Albania	Eger
15:30	Talpa 55' (pen.); Bohdanov 56'	Report	Dodaj 18'; Maksuti 90'	Stadium: Szentmarjay Tibor Városi Stadion

13 November Friendly	Albania	3–1	Luxembourg	Tirana
19:00	Rashica 23'; Brruti 35'; Dodaj 88'	Report	Bajraktari 13' (o.g.)	Stadium: Air Albania Stadium

17 November Friendly	Albania	0–0	Spain	Tirana
19:00		Report		Stadium: Air Albania Stadium

== Players ==
=== Current squad ===
- The following players were called up for the friendly against Luxembourg and Spain, on 13 November 2026 and 17 November 2026, respectively.
- Caps and goals are correct as of 17 November 2026, after the match against Spain.
- Players in **bold** have been called up or have played at least one full international match with national senior team.

No.	Pos.	Player	Date of birth (age)	Caps	Goals	Club
	GK	**Simon Simoni**	14 July 2004 (age 22)	17	0	(Swiss Football Association) Luzern
	GK	**Alain Taho**	30 April 2007 (age 19)	5	0	(Italian Football Federation) Inter U23
	GK	Aron Jukaj	19 June 2005 (age 21)	3	0	(Albanian Football Federation) Vllaznia
	DF	Arlind Kurti	24 January 2005 (age 21)	19	0	(Albanian Football Federation) Laçi
	DF	Ervin Bashi	24 July 2005 (age 21)	13	0	(Italian Football Federation) Crotone
	DF	Fabjan Përndreca	6 December 2005 (age 20)	12	0	(Albanian Football Federation) Bylisi
	DF	Gabriel Ramaj	9 February 2006 (age 20)	12	0	(Italian Football Federation) Atalanta U23
	DF	Zylyf Muça	7 March 2005 (age 21)	9	0	(Italian Football Federation) Trento
	DF	Aurel Marku	13 January 2005 (age 21)	8	0	(Albanian Football Federation) Bylisi
	DF	**Maldini Kacurri**	4 October 2005 (age 21)	4	0	(The Football Association) Grimsby Town
	DF	Omer Bajraktari	9 June 2007 (age 19)	3	0	(Football Federation of Kosovo) Malisheva
	DF	Numan Ajeti	18 March 2006 (age 20)	2	0	(Albanian Football Federation) Egnatia
	DF	**Samuele Sina**	14 February 2007 (age 19)	2	0	(Italian Football Federation) Union Brescia
	MF	**Feta Fetai** (captain)	11 May 2005 (age 21)	16	1	(Croatian Football Federation) Lokomotiva
	MF	**Etnik Brruti**	4 March 2004 (age 22)	13	4	(Croatian Football Federation) Hajduk Split
	MF	Dario Daka	24 January 2004 (age 22)	10	1	(Albanian Football Federation) Vora
	MF	Luan Simnica	22 January 2004 (age 22)	5	0	(Royal Belgian Football Association) Lokeren
	MF	Ledjo Tresa	25 July 2005 (age 21)	5	0	(Albanian Football Federation) Elbasani
	MF	Ammar Asani	11 June 2006 (age 20)	5	0	(Swedish Football Association) Trelleborg
	MF	Ergis Arifi	11 January 2007 (age 19)	4	0	(Albanian Football Federation) Teuta
	MF	Mattia Huqi	21 June 2007 (age 19)	3	0	(Italian Football Federation) Empoli U20
	FW	Ermir Rashica (vice-captain)	24 March 2004 (age 22)	17	5	(Ukrainian Association of Football) Kharkiv
	FW	Kevin Dodaj	3 September 2005 (age 21)	16	4	(Polish Football Association) Lechia Gdańsk
	FW	Erald Maksuti	10 May 2004 (age 22)	13	2	(Russian Football Union) Akhmat Grozny
	FW	Rrok Toma	27 February 2004 (age 22)	13	0	(Albanian Football Federation) Partizani

=== Recent call-ups ===
The following players have been called up for the team within the last 12 months and are still available for selection.

Pos.	Player	Date of birth (age)	Caps	Goals	Club	Latest call-up
GK	Giulio Veliaj	1 April 2005 (age 21)	4	0	(Italy) Forlì	v. Ukraine, 5 October 2026
GK	Skander Tahri	3 January 2005 (age 21)	3	0	(Albania) Partizani	v. Algeria, 26 August 2026
GK	Amarildo Dervishaj	8 April 2006 (age 20)	1	0	(Albania) Kukësi	v. Algeria, 26 August 2026
GK	Klevi Totoshi	21 May 2005 (age 21)	0	0	(Albania) Elbasani	v. Italy, 8 June 2026
DF	Elton Fikaj	18 October 2005 (age 21)	16	0	(Poland) Piast Gliwice	v. Ukraine, 5 October 2026^{INJ}
DF	Adi Kurti	17 January 2006 (age 20)	2	0	(Italy) Audace Cerignola	v. Ukraine, 5 October 2026
DF	Kris Gecaj	14 November 2008 (age 18)	1	0	(Italy) Genoa U20	v. Ukraine, 5 October 2026
DF	Endrit Asani	29 September 2008 (age 18)	0	0	(Switzerland) Lausanne II	v. Ukraine, 5 October 2026
DF	Arlind Leshi	1 December 2005 (age 20)	3	1	(Albania) Bylisi	v. Algeria, 26 August 2026
DF	Valentin Daja	17 February 2006 (age 20)	3	1	(Albania) Besa	v. Algeria, 26 August 2026
DF	Rajmond Marinaj	23 November 2006 (age 19)	3	1	(Albania) Vora	v. Algeria, 26 August 2026
DF	Antonios Dhama	19 January 2006 (age 20)	3	0	(Greece) Olympiacos B	v. Algeria, 26 August 2026
DF	Renato Halili	25 October 2007 (age 19)	2	0	(Albania) Vora	v. Algeria, 26 August 2026
DF	Kevi Mejdani	13 February 2005 (age 21)	1	0	(Albania) Kukësi	v. Algeria, 26 August 2026
DF	Enes Osmani	13 February 2004 (age 22)	7	1	(Czech Republic) Kladno	v. Italy, 8 June 2026
DF	Diar Vokrri	27 June 2004 (age 22)	2	0	(Kosovo) Ballkani	v. Uzbekistan, 30 March 2026
MF	Aidon Shehu	11 October 2006 (age 20)	11	1	(Greece) PAS Pyrgos	v. Ukraine, 5 October 2026
MF	Benjamin Dibrani	9 February 2004 (age 22)	2	0	(Spain) Mérida	v. Ukraine, 5 October 2026
MF	Jordi Jaku	27 March 2006 (age 20)	4	0	(Italy) Bologna U20	v. Algeria, 26 August 2026
MF	Ersi Bode	16 February 2006 (age 20)	3	1	(Netherlands) ADO U21	v. Algeria, 26 August 2026
MF	Orgito Ruçi	10 March 2005 (age 21)	3	0	(Albania) Vora	v. Algeria, 26 August 2026
MF	Bjorni Duka	14 October 2007 (age 19)	3	0	(Albania) Egnatia	v. Algeria, 26 August 2026
MF	Oresti Kasmollari	3 June 2005 (age 21)	2	0	(Albania) Kastrioti	v. Algeria, 26 August 2026
MF	Burak Alili	11 February 2004 (age 22)	10	1	(Switzerland) Sion	v. Italy, 8 June 2026^{INJ}
FW	Gabriel Kulla	20 February 2008 (age 18)	1	0	(Italy) Sassuolo U20	v. Ukraine, 5 October 2026^{U19}
FW	Kristi Bespallov	13 January 2005 (age 21)	3	0	(Albania) Kukësi	v. Algeria, 26 August 2026
FW	Nebi Qokthi	16 August 2006 (age 20)	3	0	(Albania) Partizani	v. Algeria, 26 August 2026
FW	Hetem Lushaj	17 October 2007 (age 19)	3	0	(Albania) Flamurtari	v. Algeria, 26 August 2026
FW	Emiljano Mihana	18 March 2008 (age 18)	1	0	(Albania) Vora	v. Algeria, 26 August 2026
FW	Elmedin Rama	25 March 2005 (age 21)	5	1	(Poland) Arka Gdynia	v. Italy, 8 June 2026
FW	Olsi Myrta	20 January 2006 (age 20)	2	0	(Albania) Laçi	v. Italy, 8 June 2026^{INJ}
FW	Eron Gojani	2 December 2006 (age 19)	1	0	(Sweden) GIF Sundsvall	v. Uzbekistan, 30 March 2026
Notes: ^{A} = Was called up from national senior squad.; ^{INJ} = The player is not part of the current squad due to injury.; ^{U19} = Was called up from national under-19 squad.

== Coaching staff ==
Current coaching staff:

Position	Name
Head coach	(Albania) Alban Bushi
Assistant coach	(Albania) Endri Zjarri
Goalkeeping coach	(Albania) Erion Meta
Athletic coach	(Albania) Mark Dodaj
Team manager	(Albania) Denis Lilo
Video analyst	(Albania) Xhoen Tugu
Team doctor	(Albania) Mehmet Buzmerxhani
Physiotherapist	(Albania) Gledi Rexha
Physiotherapist	(Albania) Edison Koçi
Base materials	(Albania) Lusjos Sina

=== Balkan Youth Championship ===
Balkan Youth Championship record
Year	Round	Position	Pld	W	D*	L	GF	GA
1976–1978	Champions	1st	6	3	2	1	12	6
(Greece) 1981	Champions	1st	2	2	0	0	6	2
Total	2 Titles	2/2	8	5	2	1	18	8

*Denotes draws include knockout matches decided on penalty shoot-out.
**Gold background colour indicates that the tournament was won.

== Honours ==
Balkan Youth Championship

- Winners (2): 1978, 1981

== See also ==
- Albania national football team
- Albania national under-23 football team
- Albania national under-20 football team
- Albania national under-19 football team
- Albania national under-18 football team
- Albania national under-17 football team
- Albania national under-16 football team
- Albania national under-15 football team
- Albania national football team results
- Albania national youth football team
- Albanian Superliga
- Football in Albania
- List of Albania international footballers
