= Balkan Youth Championship =

Regional football competition held from 1968 to 1981

Balkan Youth Championship (officially Coupe Balkanique de Football des Espoirs) was a competition held in the 1968-1981 period among youth team of Balkan countries: from 1968 to 1975 it was disputed among Under-23 teams, whereas, starting from 1976 until 1981, it was disputed among Under-21 football teams.

== List of winners ==
Edition	Year	Venue	Winners
1	1968	Thessaloniki, Greece	Bulgaria
2	1969	Romania	Greece
3	1970	Bulgaria	Bulgaria
4	1971	Athens, Greece	Greece
5	1972	İzmir, Turkey	Yugoslavia
6	1973	Skopje, Yugoslavia	Bulgaria
7	1974	Romania	Romania
8	1975	Haskovo, Bulgaria	Yugoslavia
9	1976	Thessaloniki, Greece	Yugoslavia
10	1978	Double leg final	Albania
11	1981	Volos, Greece	Albania

== Titles by nation ==
Country	Winners	Runners-up
Bulgaria	3	3
(Socialist Federal Republic of Yugoslavia) Yugoslavia	3	1
Greece	2	2
Albania	2	1
Romania	1	2
Turkey	–	2
