= Luxembourg national under-21 football team =

Men's national U-21 association football team

Luxembourg Under-21
- Nickname(s): De Roude Léiw (The Red Lions)
- Association: Luxembourg Football Federation
- Confederation: UEFA (Europe)
- Head coach: Mario Mutsch
First colours	Second colours

The Luxembourg national under-21 football team is the national representative under-21 football team of Luxembourg. It is controlled by the Luxembourg Football Federation (FLF). The team is the feeder team to the Luxembourg's national team. The team competes in the biennial European Under-21 Championship. Since the establishment of the UEFA European Under-21 Championship in 1978 the team has always finished bottom of their qualification group.

The team is for Luxembourgish players aged under 21 at the start of the calendar year in which a two-year UEFA European Under-21 Championship campaign begins, so some players can remain with the squad until the age of 23. As long as they are eligible, players can play for Luxembourg at any level, making it possible to play for the U21s, senior side, and again for the U21s. This has been the case for several senior team players like Billy Bernard, Lars Gerson and Maurice Deville. In their history they have only ever won two qualification games. Their first win occurred in their 1986 UEFA European Under-21 Football Championship qualification campaign where they defeated Belgium 3–1. Their second victory came in a 2011 UEFA European Under-21 Football Championship qualification Group 3 away game against Bosnia and Herzegovina in a 1–0 win.

== Competition records ==
=== UEFA European Under-21 Football Championship ===
UEFA European Under-21 Championship record										UEFA European Under-21 Championship qualification record					
Year	Round	Position	Pld	W	D	L	GF	GA	Squad	Pld	W	D	L	GF	GA
1978	Did not qualify									4	0	0	4	2	14
1980	Did not qualify									4	0	0	4	1	12
1982	Did not qualify									4	0	0	4	2	12
1984	Did not qualify									4	0	0	4	1	15
1986	Did not qualify									4	1	0	3	5	17
1988	Did not qualify									6	0	0	6	2	13
1990	Did not qualify									6	0	2	4	1	10
1992	Did not qualify									4	0	0	4	0	10
1994	Did not qualify									8	0	1	7	2	26
1996	Did not qualify									10	0	1	9	0	40
1998	Did not qualify									8	0	0	8	3	36
2000	Did not qualify									8	0	0	8	0	29
2002	Did not qualify									8	0	0	8	1	38
2004	Did not qualify									8	0	0	8	0	31
2006	Did not qualify									10	0	2	8	4	25
2007	Did not qualify									2	0	0	2	0	5
2009	Did not qualify									8	0	0	8	1	32
2011	Did not qualify									8	1	1	6	2	16
2013	Did not qualify									8	0	0	8	6	31
2015	Did not qualify									8	1	0	7	5	23
2017	Did not qualify									10	1	3	6	5	18
2019	Did not qualify									10	2	1	7	7	21
2021	Did not qualify									10	1	0	9	3	29
2023	Did not qualify									10	0	1	9	2	26
2025	Did not qualify									10	2	2	6	6	23
2027	Did not qualify									10	3	1	6	13	22
Total										190	12	15	163	74	574

== 2027 UEFA European Under-21 Football Championship ==
Pos	Team	Pld	W	D	L	GF	GA	GD	Pts	Qualification	France	Iceland	Switzerland	Faroe Islands	Luxembourg	Estonia
1	France	10	8	2	0	34	8	+26	26	Final tournament	—	2–1	7–1	1–0	3–2	6–1
2	Iceland	10	5	3	2	22	11	+11	18	Play-offs	1–1	—	5–1	1–2	2–1	6–2
3	Switzerland	10	5	2	3	17	17	0	17		1–1	0–0	—	1–0	5–0	2–1
4	Faroe Islands	10	4	0	6	8	17	−9	12		0–6	0–2	1–3	—	0–1	2–1
5	Luxembourg	10	3	1	6	13	22	−9	10		1–5	1–3	2–1	0–1	—	3–0
6	Estonia	10	0	2	8	9	28	−19	2		0–2	1–1	0–2	1–2	2–2	—

Source: UEFA
Rules for classification: Tiebreakers

== Current squad ==
The following players were called up for the matches against Iceland on 10 October and Switzerland on 14 October 2025.

Caps and goals as of 10 November.

No.	Pos.	Player	Date of birth (age)	Caps	Goals	Club
	GK	Joao Alves Margato	17 December 2005 (age 20)	0	0	(Luxembourg Football Federation) Progrès Niederkorn
	GK	Nayan Campos	7 July 2008 (age 18)	0	0	(Luxembourg Football Federation) UN Käerjéng 97
	GK	Ben Schmit	11 February 2008 (age 18)	1	0	(German Football Association) SV Eintracht Trier 05
	DF	Massimo Agostinelli	12 April 2005 (age 21)	9	0	(German Football Association) FC Ingolstadt
	DF	Hugo Costa	7 July 2005 (age 21)	0	0	(Luxembourg Football Federation) Wiltz 71
	DF	Clayton Irigoyen	18 February 2005 (age 21)	7	0	(German Football Association) FV Illertissen
	DF	Fabio Lohei	12 April 2005 (age 21)	7	0	(German Football Association) Eintracht Trier
	DF	Tiziano Mancini	17 July 2006 (age 20)	0	0	(Luxembourg Football Federation) Jeunesse Esch
	DF	Helmer Tavares	27 April 2007 (age 19)	0	0	(Royal Spanish Football Federation) Alcobendas CF
	DF	Eliot Thelen	12 January 2007 (age 19)	0	0	(Italian Football Federation) Pescara
	DF	Yohann Torres	6 December 2004 (age 21)	16	0	(Luxembourg Football Federation) Rodange 91
	MF	Rayan Berberi	18 March 2004 (age 22)	8	1	(Royal Belgian Football Association) Olympic Charleroi
	MF	Ivan Englaro	12 November 2004 (age 21)	10	0	(Luxembourg Football Federation) F91 Dudelange
	MF	Tim Flick	23 November 2005 (age 20)	4	0	(Luxembourg Football Federation) Jeunesse Esch
	MF	Miguel Goncalves	18 August 2004 (age 22)	13	1	(German Football Association) FC Hombourg
	MF	David Gonçalves Nascimento	2 January 2007 (age 19)	0	0	(Luxembourg Football Federation) UT Pétange
	MF	Hugo Luis Afonso	28 January 2005 (age 21)	1	0	(Luxembourg Football Federation) Jeunesse Esch
	MF	Dino Sabotic	19 April 2006 (age 20)	2	0	(Luxembourg Football Federation) UT Pétange
	FW	James Alves Rodrigues	6 May 2004 (age 22)	5	1	(Portuguese Football Federation) Gil Vicente
	FW	Diego Duarte	3 May 2006 (age 20)	1	0	(French Football Federation) FC Metz
	FW	Leon Elshan	22 September 2004 (age 22)	8	3	(Luxembourg Football Federation) Jeunesse Esch
	FW	Flavjo Hoxha	28 October 2006 (age 20)	2	0	(Luxembourg Football Federation) Progrès Niederkorn
	FW	Jayson Videira	17 February 2005 (age 21)	4	0	(German Football Association) Mainz 05

== See also ==
- Luxembourg national football team
