= Elton Fikaj =

Albanian footballer (born 2005)

Personal information
- Date of birth: 18 October 2005 (age 21)
- Place of birth: Athens, Greece
- Height: 1.88 m (6 ft 2 in)
- Position: Left-back

Team information
- Current team: Piast Gliwice
- Number: 3

Youth career
- 2018–2023: Panathinaikos

Senior career*
Years	Team	Apps	(Gls)
2023–2024	Panathinaikos B	18	(0)
2024–2026	Panathinaikos	1	(0)
2026–	Piast Gliwice	4	(0)

International career^{‡}
2021	Albania U17	4	(0)
2022–2023	Albania U19	11	(0)
2024–	Albania U21	16	(0)
- * Club domestic league appearances and goals as of 20:40, 19 August 2026 (UTC) ‡ National team caps and goals as of 19:43, 8 June 2026 (UTC)

Elton Fikaj (Greek: Έλτον Φικάι; born 18 October 2005) is a professional footballer who plays as a left-back for Ekstraklasa club Piast Gliwice. Born in Greece, he represents Albania at youth level.

== Career ==
=== Panathinaikos ===
On 12 July 2023, Fikaj signed with Panathinaikos until the summer of 2026. He made his professional debut in the match against Panetolikos. On 17 July 2024, he renewed his contract with Panathinaikos until June 2028. He made his European debut in a match against Vikingur on 13 February 2025.

=== Piast Gliwice ===
On 27 January 2026, Fikaj signed for Polish Ekstraklasa club Piast Gliwice on a two-and-half-year contract, with an option to extend.
