= France national under-21 football team =

National U-21 association football team

France Under-21
- Nickname(s): Les Bleuets (The Little Blues); Les Espoirs (The Hopes)
- Association: French Football Federation
- Head coach: Gérald Baticle
- Captain: Castello Lukeba
- Most caps: Mickaël Landreau (46)
- Top scorer: Odsonne Édouard; Mathys Tel (17)
First colours	Second colours

First international
- France 7–1 England (Le Havre, France; 22 May 1952)

Biggest win
- France 9–0 Cyprus (Grenoble, France; 17 October 2023)

Biggest defeat
- England 6–0 France (Sheffield, England; 28 February 1984) Records for competitive matches only.

UEFA U-21 Championship
- Appearances: 11 (first in 1982)
- Best result: Winners (1988)

The France national under-21 football team (French: Equipe de France Espoirs), known in France as Les Espoirs (French pronunciation: [ɛs.pwaʁ], The Hopes), is the national under-21 football team of France and is controlled by the French Football Federation. The team competes in the UEFA European Under-21 Championship, held every two years.

Following the realignment of UEFA's youth competitions in 1976, under-21 football teams in Europe were formed. The team is exclusively for football players who are age 21 or under at the start of the two-year campaign of the UEFA European Under-21 Championship, meaning a player can represent the national team until the age of 23.

France has won the Under-21 Championship once, in 1988. Notable players on the team that went on to play for the senior national team include Laurent Blanc, Eric Cantona, Franck Sauzée, and Jocelyn Angloma, among others. Blanc was named the tournament's Golden Player. The team's best finish since was in 2002 when the team finished runners-up to the Czech Republic in Switzerland.

The France under-21 team does not have a permanent home. The team plays in stadiums located all around France, particularly grounds of Ligue 2 clubs. Because of the smaller demand compared to the senior national team, smaller facilities are used. Recently, the under-21 team has established the Stade Auguste-Delaune II, home of Stade Reims, as a home residence having played numerous matches there over the past two seasons.

== History ==
Though, under-21 teams weren't formed until 1976, Les Espoirs, a youth national team in France, had existed since 1950 playing its first match on 22 May 1952 defeating England 7–1 at the Stade Jules Deschaseaux in Le Havre. The team's next match was two years later suffering a 3–1 defeat to Italy in Vicenza. For the rest of the decade, the youth team played seven more matches, which included a 1–1 draw with Hungary in Budapest and a 2–0 loss to England in Sunderland in 1959. In the 1960s, Espoirs continued to play matches against fellow national youth sides. However, on 18 December 1968, the team contested a match against Algeria senior team in Algiers recording an impressive 5–2 victory. Four days later, the team draw 1–1 with the under-23 team of Algeria in Oran. On 12 February 1969, the Espoirs played the Hungary senior team at the Stade Gerland in Lyon. The match ended in a 2–2 draw.

== Team image ==
=== Media coverage ===
France's under-21 football friendlies and qualifying matches are broadcast by Direct 8.

== Results and fixtures ==
Legend

Win Draw Lose Fixture

=== 2025 ===
14 November U21 Euro 2027 qualification	Switzerland	1–1	France	Lausanne, Switzerland
21:00	Vogt 38'	Report	Kroupi 66'	Stadium: Stade de la Tuilière; Attendance: 5,021; Referee: Ishmael Barbara (Malta)

17 November U21 Euro 2027 qualification	France	1–0	Faroe Islands	Grenoble, France
21:00	Tel 37'	Report		Stadium: Stade des Alpes; Attendance: 2,421; Referee: Igor Boşca (Moldova)

=== 2026 ===
26 March U21 Euro 2027 qualification	Luxembourg	1–5	France	Differdange, Luxembourg
19:30	Gonçalves 78'	Report	Zézé 2'; Ngoura 14' (pen.); Atangana 19'; Fofana 89', 90+2'	Stadium: Stade Municipal; Attendance: 1,783; Referee: Matthias Jöllenbeck (Germany)

30 March U21 Euro 2027 qualification	France	2–1	Iceland	Auxerre, France
19:00	Lebreton 10'; Zeze 29'	Report	Guðjohnsen 24' (pen.)	Stadium: Stade de l'Abbé-Deschamps; Attendance: 4,127; Referee: Mervan Bejtullahu (Kosovo)

25 September U21 Euro 2027 qualification	Iceland	v	France	Reykjavík, Iceland
		Report		Stadium: Þróttarvöllur

29 September U21 Euro 2027 qualification	Estonia	v	France	Pärnu, Estonia
		Report		Stadium: Pärnu Rannastaadion

3 October (Note: Match postponed due to a bus accident involving the Luxembourg national team.) U21 Euro 2027 qualification	France	v	Luxembourg	Orléans, France
		Report		Stadium: Stade de la Source

6 October U21 Euro 2027 qualification	France	v	Switzerland	Orléans, France
		Report		Stadium: Stade de la Source

== Coaching staff ==
=== Current coaching staff ===
As of 21 August 2024

Position	Name	Nationality
Head coach	Gérald Baticle	French
Assistant coach	Gaël Clichy	French
Goalkeeping coach	Jérémie Janot	French
Doctor	Marc Chasselat	French
Physiotherapist	Florian Simon	French

== Players ==
=== Current squad ===
For the 2025–26 and 2026–27 seasons, including the 2027 UEFA European Under-21 Championship, players born on or after 1 January 2004 are eligible.

The following players were called up for 2027 UEFA European Under-21 Championship qualification matches against Iceland, Estonia, Luxembourg and Switzerland on 25 and 29 September and 3 and 6 October 2026; respectively.

Note: Names in italics denote players that have been capped by the senior team.

Caps and goals as of 30 March 2026, after the match against Iceland.

No.	Pos.	Player	Date of birth (age)	Caps	Goals	Club
	GK	Ewen Jaouen	29 December 2005 (age 20)	2	0	(The Football Association) Newcastle United
	GK	Mathieu Patouillet	20 February 2004 (age 22)	0	0	(French Football Federation) Brest
	GK	Issiaka Touré	7 November 2004 (age 22)	0	0	(French Football Federation) Aubagne Air Bel
	DF	Nathan Zézé	18 June 2005 (age 21)	8	3	(Saudi Arabian Football Federation) Neom
	DF	Saël Kumbedi	26 March 2005 (age 21)	7	0	(German Football Association) VfL Wolfsburg
	DF	Jaydee Canvot	29 July 2006 (age 20)	6	0	(The Football Association) Crystal Palace
	DF	Christian Mawissa	8 April 2005 (age 21)	5	0	(French Football Federation) Monaco (Note: Monaco is a Monégasque club playing in the French football league system.)
	DF	Dayann Methalie	18 February 2006 (age 20)	4	2	(The Football Association) Sunderland
	DF	Ismaëlo Ganiou	14 March 2005 (age 21)	2	0	(French Football Federation) Lens
	DF	Joane Gadou	17 January 2007 (age 19)	0	0	(German Football Association) Borussia Dortmund
	MF	Lesley Ugochukwu	26 March 2004 (age 22)	12	0	(Turkish Football Federation) Galatasaray
	MF	Valentin Atangana	25 August 2005 (age 21)	7	2	(Saudi Arabian Football Federation) Al-Ahli
	MF	Saïmon Bouabré	1 June 2006 (age 20)	4	0	(Saudi Arabian Football Federation) Al-Hilal
	MF	Kévin Danois	28 June 2004 (age 22)	2	0	(French Football Federation) Auxerre
	MF	Noé Lebreton	22 April 2004 (age 22)	1	1	(Royal Dutch Football Association) NEC
	MF	Aladji Bamba	14 July 2006 (age 20)	0	0	(The Football Association) Newcastle United
	MF	Darryl Bakola	30 November 2007 (age 18)	0	0	(Italian Football Federation) Sassuolo
	FW	Mathys Tel	27 April 2005 (age 21)	20	12	(The Football Association) Tottenham Hotspur
	FW	Jean-Mattéo Bahoya	7 May 2005 (age 21)	5	1	(The Football Association) Leeds United
	FW	Steve Ngoura	22 February 2005 (age 21)	2	1	(Royal Belgian Football Association) Cercle Brugge
	FW	Giovani Versini	16 March 2004 (age 22)	2	0	(French Football Federation) Brest
	FW	Senny Mayulu	17 May 2006 (age 20)	2	0	(French Football Federation) Paris Saint-Germain
	FW	Ethan Mbappé	29 December 2006 (age 19)	0	0	(French Football Federation) Lille

=== Recent call-ups ===
The following players have also been called up to the France under-21 squad and remain eligible:

Pos.	Player	Date of birth (age)	Caps	Goals	Club	Latest call-up
GK	Guillaume Restes	11 March 2005 (age 21)	19	0	(France) Toulouse	v. Iceland, 30 March 2026
GK	Robin Risser	2 December 2004 (age 21)	5	0	(France) Lens	v. Iceland, 30 March 2026
GK	Lisandru Olmeta	21 July 2005 (age 21)	0	0	(Portugal) Torreense	v. Faroe Islands, 17 November 2025
DF	Leny Yoro	13 November 2005 (age 20)	10	0	(England) Manchester United	v. Iceland, 25 September 2026 ^{SEN}
DF	Jeanuël Belocian	17 February 2005 (age 21)	7	0	(Spain) Racing Santander	v. Iceland, 30 March 2026
DF	Nhoa Sangui	29 August 2006 (age 20)	2	0	(France) Paris FC	v. Iceland, 30 March 2026
DF	**Jérémy Jacquet**	13 July 2005 (age 21)	5	0	(England) Liverpool	v. Faroe Islands, 17 November 2025
DF	Thérence Koudou	13 December 2004 (age 21)	1	0	(Belgium) Mechelen	v. Estonia, 13 October 2025
DF	Kassoum Ouattara	14 October 2004 (age 22)	3	0	(Turkey) Beşiktaş	v. Italy, 15 November 2024
DF	Yoan Koré	16 November 2004 (age 21)	0	0	(France) Paris FC	v. Spain, 28 March 2023
MF	Mamadou Coulibaly	21 April 2004 (age 22)	2	0	(France) Monaco	v. Iceland, 30 March 2026
MF	Djaoui Cissé	31 January 2004 (age 22)	8	4	(France) Rennes	v. Faroe Islands, 17 November 2025
MF	Louis Leroux	23 January 2006 (age 20)	3	1	(France) Nantes	v. Faroe Islands, 17 November 2025
MF	**Warren Zaïre-Emery**	8 March 2006 (age 20)	4	0	(France) Paris Saint-Germain	v. Estonia, 13 October 2025
MF	Mathys Detourbet	29 April 2007 (age 19)	0	0	(France) Monaco	2025 UEFA European Under-21 Championship ^{PRE}
FW	Tidiam Gomis	8 August 2006 (age 20)	0	0	(Germany) RB Leipzig	v. Iceland, 25 September 2026 ^{INJ}
FW	Rayan Fofana	12 February 2006 (age 20)	2	2	(France) Le Havre	v. Iceland, 30 March 2026
FW	Dehmaine Tabibou	17 April 2005 (age 21)	2	0	(France) Nantes	v. Iceland, 30 March 2026
FW	Herba Guirassy	29 August 2006 (age 20)	1	0	(Switzerland) Young Boys	v. Iceland, 30 March 2026
FW	Mamadou Diakhon	22 September 2005 (age 21)	0	0	(Belgium) Club Brugge	v. Luxembourg, 26 March 2026 ^{INJ}
FW	Sidiki Cherif	15 December 2006 (age 19)	0	0	(England) Coventry City	v. Luxembourg, 26 March 2026 ^{INJ}
FW	Lucas Michal	22 June 2005 (age 21)	1	0	(Belgium) Cercle Brugge	v. Faroe Islands, 17 November 2025
FW	Wilson Odobert	28 November 2004 (age 21)	16	5	(England) Tottenham Hotspur	v. Faroe Islands, 17 November 2025
FW	Eli Junior Kroupi	23 June 2006 (age 20)	5	3	(England) Bournemouth	v. Faroe Islands, 17 November 2025
FW	Noah Edjouma	4 October 2005 (age 21)	3	0	(France) Brest	v. Estonia, 13 October 2025
FW	**Désiré Doué**	3 June 2005 (age 21)	4	1	(France) Paris Saint-Germain	v. Italy, 15 November 2024
FW	Mohamed-Ali Cho	19 January 2004 (age 22)	8	0	(England) Hull City	v. Bosnia and Herzegovina, 10 September 2024

Notes

- Players in **bold** have played at senior level.
- ^{CLU} Player withdrew from the squad because of a club necessity.
- ^{INJ} Player withdrew from the squad due to an injury.
- ^{PRE} Preliminary squad
- ^{SEN} Player withdrew from the squad due to a call up to the senior team.
- ^{WD} Player withdrew from the squad due to personal reasons.

=== Previous squads ===
U-21 European Championship squads

- 2023 UEFA Under-21 Championship squad
- 2021 UEFA Under-21 Championship squad
- 2019 UEFA Under-21 Championship squad
- 2006 UEFA Under-21 Championship squad
- 2002 UEFA Under-21 Championship squad
- 1996 UEFA Under-21 Championship squad

== Honours ==
- UEFA European Under-21 Championship

Champions (1): 1988
Runners-up (1): 2002
Third place (1): 1996

- Toulon Tournament

Champions (12): 1977, 1984, 1985, 1987, 1988, 1989, 1997, 2004, 2005, 2006, 2007, 2015
Finalists (14): 1975, 1976, 1978, 1980, 1986, 1991, 1993, 1995, 1996, 1998, 2009, 2011, 2014, 2016

== Competitive record ==
=== UEFA U-23 Championship ===
- 1972: Did not qualify. Finished 4th of 4 in qualification group.
- 1974: Did not qualify. Finished 3rd of 3 in qualification group.
- 1976: Losing quarter-finalists.

=== UEFA European Under-21 Championship ===
Year	Result	Pld	W	D*	L	GF	GA
1978	Did not qualify	4	0	1	3	4	6
1980	Did not qualify	4	2	1	1	3	2
1982	Quarter-finals	6	3	1	2	9	8
1984	Quarter-finals	6	3	1	2	11	9
1986	Quarter-finals	8	2	3	3	13	13
1988	Champions	12	6	5	1	21	13
1990	Did not qualify	6	3	2	1	11	7
1992	Did not qualify	8	3	2	3	7	5
(France) 1994	Fourth place	14	10	2	2	24	8
(Spain) 1996	Third place	14	8	4	2	30	5
(Romania) 1998	Did not qualify	8	4	3	1	13	8
(Slovakia) 2000	Did not qualify	8	6	2	2	19	6
(Switzerland) 2002	Runners-up	15	12	3	0	27	7
(Germany) 2004	Did not qualify	10	8	1	1	20	7
(Portugal) 2006	Semi-finals	14	10	2	2	24	10
(Netherlands) 2007	Did not qualify	4	2	1	1	6	3
(Sweden) 2009	Did not qualify	10	5	3	2	17	7
(Denmark) 2011	Did not qualify	8	4	3	1	12	6
(Israel) 2013	Did not qualify	10	8	0	2	23	7
(Czech Republic) 2015	Did not qualify	10	8	1	1	31	11
(Poland) 2017	Did not qualify	10	6	2	2	17	8
(Italy) 2019	Semi-finals	14	11	2	1	28	11
(Hungary) (Slovenia) 2021	Quarter-finals	14	11	0	3	37	13
(Georgia (country)) (Romania) 2023	Quarter-finals	14	11	2	1	39	10
(Slovakia) 2025	Semi-finals	13	8	2	3	32	14
Total	1 title	236	145	48	43	446	194

*Draws include knockout matches decided via penalty shoot-out.
**Gold background colour indicates that the tournament was won. Red border colour indicates tournament was held on home soil.

== See also ==
- Sport in France
  - Football in France
    - Women's football in France
- France national football team
- France women's national football team
