= Mattias Hellisdal =

Faroese footballer (born 2006)

Personal information
- Full name: Mattias Johnnyson Hellisdal
- Date of birth: 21 January 2006 (age 20)
- Place of birth: Faroe Islands
- Height: 1.80 m (5 ft 11 in)
- Position: Midfielder

Team information
- Current team: Västerås SK
- Number: 30

Youth career
- –2022: B36 Tórshavn

Senior career*
| Years | Team | Apps | (Gls) |
| 2022–2023 | B36 Tórshavn II | 9 | (7) |
| 2022–2025 | B36 Tórshavn | 62 | (9) |
| 2025– | Västerås SK | 11 | (1) |

International career^{‡}
| 2022 | Faroe Islands U17 | 5 | (0) |
| 2023–2024 | Faroe Islands U19 | 9 | (0) |
| 2025– | Faroe Islands U21 | 7 | (1) |
| 2026– | Faroe Islands | 3 | (0) |
- * Club domestic league appearances and goals as of 21:12, 1 August 2026 (UTC) ‡ National team caps and goals as of 15:42, 8 October 2026 (UTC)

Mattias Johnnyson Hellisdal (born 21 January 2006) is a Faroese footballer who plays as a midfielder for Allsvenskan side Västerås SK and the Faroe Islands national team.

== Club career ==
Hellisdal made his debut for B36 Tórshavn in August 2022. That year, he scored twice for their youth team in the Blaðberasteypinum final, a youth tournament in the Faroe Islands, as B36 Tórshavn won 3–0. In July 2024, he extended his contract for two seasons. In late 2024, he went on trial with a team in the Eliteserien.

In August 2025, Hellisdal signed for Swedish side Västerås SK on a four-year contract for 300,000 kr. His debut came in a Superettan match against Östersunds FK. That season, he also helped them win the 2025 Superettan title.

== International career ==
Hellisdal has represented the Faroe Islands at under-17, under-19, and under-21 level. His only international goal came for the under-21s, where he scored in a 2–1 win against Iceland in Group C of 2027 UEFA European Under-21 Championship qualification.

On 26 September 2026, Hellisdal made his debut for the Faroe Islands national team in a 2026–27 UEFA Nations League C game against Kazakhstan.
