= Burak Alili =

Albanian footballer (born 2004)

Personal information
- Date of birth: 11 February 2004 (age 22)
- Place of birth: Biel, Switzerland
- Height: 1.82 m (6 ft 0 in)
- Position: Midfielder

Team information
- Current team: Nyon (on loan from Sion)
- Number: 10

Youth career
- –2020: Xamax
- 2020–2021: Bejune

Senior career*
Years	Team	Apps	(Gls)
2021–2023	Xamax II	19	(7)
2021–2024	Xamax	21	(2)
2024	Viktoria Plzeň B	8	(0)
2024–2025	Lafnitz	17	(2)
2025	Lafnitz II	6	(4)
2025–	Sion	0	(0)
2025–	→ Nyon (loan)	27	(4)

International career^{‡}
2019	Switzerland U15	2	(0)
2019	Switzerland U16	2	(0)
2022	Switzerland U19	1	(0)
2024	Switzerland U20	5	(0)
2025–	Albania U21	10	(1)
- * Club domestic league appearances and goals as of 18 September 2026 ‡ National team caps and goals as of 8 June 2026

Burak Alili (born 11 February 2004) is a professional footballer who plays as a midfielder for Swiss Challenge League club Nyon on loan from Sion. Born in Switzerland, he represented it internationally on junior level before switching allegiance to Albania.

== Club career ==
Alili signed his first professional contract with Xamax on 11 August 2020. He made his professional debut against Yverdon Sport on 21 August 2021. On 12 January 2022, he extended his contract with Xamax until 2024.

Alili joined Viktoria Plzeň on 12 February 2024.

On 5 July 2024, he signed a contract with Austrian 2. Liga club Lafnitz until 2026. Alili joined Sion on 13 August 2025. Initially, it joined Nyon on loan as a collaboration on 13 August 2025.
