= Ermir Rashica =

Footballer (born 2004)

Personal information
- Full name: Ermir Rashica
- Date of birth: 24 March 2004 (age 22)
- Place of birth: Mitrovica, Kosovo under UN administration
- Position: Right winger

Team information
- Current team: Metalist 1925 Kharkiv
- Number: 19

Youth career
- –2022: Trepça '89

Senior career*
Years	Team	Apps	(Gls)
2022–2023	Trepça '89	6	(0)
2023–2025	Skënderbeu Korçë	60	(17)
2025–	Metalist 1925 Kharkiv	36	(5)

International career^{‡}
2021–2022	Kosovo U19	6	(1)
2023–	Albania U21	8	(2)
- * Club domestic league appearances and goals as of 3 June 2026 ‡ National team caps and goals as of 7 January 2025

Ermir Rashica (born 24 March 2004) is a professional footballer who plays as a winger for Ukrainian First League club Metalist 1925 Kharkiv. Born in Kosovo and a former Kosovar youth international, he currently represents Albania at youth level.

His main position is right winger, but he can also play as a left winger as well as centre-forward.

== Career statistics ==
=== Club ===
As of 7 January 2024

Club	Season	League			Cup		Continental		Other		Total	
Club	Season	Division	Apps	Goals	Apps	Goals	Apps	Goals	Apps	Goals	Apps	Goals
Trepça '89	2022–23	Football Superleague of Kosovo	6	0	0	0	—				6	0
Skënderbeu	2023–24	Kategoria Superiore	36	8	1	0	—				37	8
Skënderbeu	2024–25	Kategoria Superiore	19	7	0	0	—				19	7
Skënderbeu	Total		55	15	1	0	—				56	15
Career total			61	15	1	0	0	0	0	0	62	15
