= Jóhannes Bjarnason =

Icelandic footballer (born 2005)

Personal information
- Full name: Jóhannes Kristinn Bjarnason
- Date of birth: 24 February 2005 (age 21)
- Place of birth: Sutton Coldfield, England
- Height: 1.75 m (5 ft 9 in)
- Positions: Attacking midfielder; central midfielder

Team information
- Current team: FH (on loan from Víkingur)
- Number: 17

Youth career
- –2020: KR

Senior career*
Years	Team	Apps	(Gls)
2020	KR	1	(0)
2021–2023	Norrköping	1	(0)
2023–2025	KR	54	(8)
2025–2026	Kolding IF	10	(0)
2026–	Víkingur	7	(0)
2026–	→ FH (loan)	12	(1)

International career^{‡}
2019	Iceland U15	3	(0)
2021–	Iceland U17	5	(0)
2022–2023	Iceland U19	10	(0)
2024–	Iceland U21	3	(1)
- * Club domestic league appearances and goals as of 16 November 2026 ‡ National team caps and goals as of 15 April 2025

Jóhannes Kristinn Bjarnason (born 24 February 2005) is a professional footballer who plays as a midfielder for Besta deild karla side FH, on loan from Víkingur. Born in England, he represents Iceland at youth level.

== Club career ==
He made his debut for KR as a substitute in a match against Breiðablik on 21 September 2020 when he was 15 years old. He joined Norrköping after the 2020 season along with his father who was appointed as the club's U19 coach. He made his Allsvenskan debut as a substitute in a match against Degerfors on 28 November 2021.

On 30 July 2025, Bjarnason joined Danish 1st Division club Kolding IF on a four-year deal.

== International career ==
Bjarnason has featured for Iceland at under-15, under-17, under-19 and under-21 level.

== Personal life ==
His father is former international footballer Bjarni Guðjónsson. His paternal grandfather is manager Guðjón Þórðarson. His paternal uncles are former international footballers Jóhannes Karl Guðjónsson, Þórður Guðjónsson and Björn Bergmann Sigurðarson and his cousin is international footballer Ísak Bergmann Jóhannesson.
