= Leon Elshan =

Luxembourgish footballer (born 2004)

Personal information
- Date of birth: 22 September 2004 (age 22)
- Place of birth: Ettelbruck, Luxembourg
- Height: 1.81 m (5 ft 11 in)
- Position: Centre-forward

Team information
- Current team: Jeunesse Esch
- Number: 90

Youth career
- –2016: AS Hosingen
- 2016–2019: Etzella Ettelbrück
- 2019–2020: F91 Dudelange
- 2020–2021: FC Nürnberg
- 2021–2022: Roda JC
- 2022–2023: Eintracht Trier
- 2023–2024: Fortuna Sittard

Senior career*
| Years | Team | Apps | (Gls) |
| 2024–2025 | Union Titus Pétange | 18 | (1) |
| 2025– | Jeunesse Esch | 29 | (8) |

International career^{‡}
| 2018 | Luxembourg U15 | 2 | (0) |
| 2020 | Luxembourg U16 | 1 | (3) |
| 2021–2023 | Luxembourg U19 | 8 | (7) |
| 2022– | Luxembourg U21 | 10 | (3) |
- * Club domestic league appearances and goals as of 20 October 2025 ‡ National team caps and goals as of 6 June 2026

Leon Elshan (born 22 September 2004) is a Luxembourgish professional footballer who plays as a forward for Jeunesse Esch.

== Club career ==
Born in Ettelbruck, Leon Elshan played for several Luxembourgish clubs, ending up at F91 Dudelange, before joining FC Nürnberg, in Germany.

Elshan then played for Roda JC and Eintracht Trier, where he was an attacking standout for his team in the U19 Bundesliga. He eventually signed his first professional contract with Fortuna Sittard on the summer 2023, joining the under-21s of the Eredivisie team.

== International career ==
Leon Elshan is a youth international for Luxembourg, first playing with the under-15 and under-16 teams, before becoming a prolific goalscorer with the under-19.

He was first called with Luxembourg senior team in June 2023. He also made it in the September squad, not making his debut on either occasion, whilst Luxembourg emerged as a genuine qualification contender for the Euro 2024, having only lost a game against Portugal in their qualifying group.
