= Haukur Andri Haraldsson =

Icelandic footballer (born 2005)

Personal information
- Date of birth: 24 August 2005 (age 21)
- Place of birth: Akranes, Iceland
- Position: Midfielder

Team information
- Current team: ÍA
- Number: 7

Youth career
- 2008–2021: ÍA
- 2023–: Lille

Senior career*
Years	Team	Apps	(Gls)
2021–2023	ÍA	24	(2)
2024–2025	Lille B	2	(0)
2024	→ ÍA (loan)	11	(0)
2025–	ÍA	50	(5)

International career^{‡}
2019	Iceland U15	3	(0)
2021	Iceland U17	2	(0)
2022–2023	Iceland U19	10	(0)
2024	Iceland U20	2	(0)
2025–	Iceland U21	9	(2)
- * Club domestic league appearances and goals as of 1 November 2026 ‡ National team caps and goals as of 22:00, 16 November 2026 (UTC)

Haukur Andri Haraldsson (born 24 August 2005) is an Icelandic footballer who plays as a midfielder Icelandic club ÍA and the Iceland U-21 national team.

== Club career ==
Haukur Andri is a youth academy graduate of Icelandic club ÍA. In July 2023 he joined the youth team of French side Lille after his brother Hakon Arnar joined the senior squad from Copenhagen.

== International career ==
Haukur is a current Icelandic youth national team player. He played in the 2023 UEFA European Under-19 Championship group stage.

== Personal life ==
Haukur was born into a family of footballers. His parents Haraldur Ingólfsson and Jónína Víglundsdóttir are former national team players. His brothers Tryggvi Hrafn and Hakon Arnar are also professional footballers.
