= National under-21 football team =

Type of youth association football team

A National under-21 football team represents the second-highest stage in European international football competition. Only Europe (UEFA) uses an under-21 age limit, and only for men. FIFA, the sport's worldwide governing body, runs competitions for both men and women in the under-20 age group. Among FIFA's continental confederations, CONCACAF and CONMEBOL hold U-20 championships for men, while the Asian Football Confederation (AFC) and Oceania Football Confederation (OFC) do not conduct U-20 championships, with their highest youth competitions for men being at under-19 level. For women, UEFA and the AFC run under-19 championships instead of under-20; CONCACAF, CONMEBOL, and the OFC run under-20 championships; and the CAF's under-20 "championship" is strictly a World Cup qualifier and currently has no championship match, as that confederation receives more than one berth in the U-20 Women's World Cup.

European countries compete for the UEFA Under-21 Championship. To be eligible in U-21 teams it is necessary to be a maximum of 21 years old when the competition starts.
