= Diego Duarte (footballer, born 2006) =

Luxembourgish footballer (born 2006)

Personal information
- Date of birth: 3 May 2006 (age 20)
- Place of birth: Luxembourg City, Luxembourg
- Position: Attacking midfielder

Team information
- Current team: Metz
- Number: 23

Youth career
- Mondercange
- 2015–2025: FC Metz

Senior career*
| Years | Team | Apps | (Gls) |
| 2024– | FC Metz B | 28 | (2) |
| 2026 | → Seraing (loan) | 9 | (0) |

International career^{‡}
| 2022 | Luxembourg U15 | 1 | (0) |
| 2022 | Luxembourg U16 | 1 | (0) |
| 2023–2025 | Luxembourg U19 | 9 | (1) |
| 2025– | Luxembourg U21 | 6 | (1) |
| 2026– | Luxembourg | 1 | (0) |
- * Club domestic league appearances and goals as of 23:26, 5 June 2026 (UTC) ‡ National team caps and goals as of 14:09, 4 June 2026 (UTC)

Diego Duarte (born 3 May 2006) is a Luxembourgish professional footballer who plays as an attacking midfielder for Ligue 2 club Metz and the Luxembourg national football team.

== Club career ==
Born in Luxembourg City, Duarte began his youth career at FC Mondercange before joining the youth academy of FC Metz in 2015 at the age of nine. He progressed through the club's youth academy, accruing 46 appearances for the under-19 side and 28 for the reserve team before signing his first professional contract with Metz in January 2026, effective from the summer of 2026.

Immediately upon signing, Duarte was loaned to RFC Seraing, the Belgian satellite club of Metz, for the remainder of the 2025–26 season, where he made eight appearances in the Challenger Pro League.

== International career ==
Duarte initially represented Portugal at under-15 and under-16 level before switching allegiance to represent Luxembourg from 2022 onwards. He represented Luxembourg at under-19 level for qualifying matches and subsequently stepped up to the under-21 side.

On 3 June 2026, Duarte made his senior international debut, coming on as a substitute in the 87th minute in a friendly against Italy at the Stade de Luxembourg in Luxembourg City, which Luxembourg lost 0–1. He had been called up to the senior squad as a replacement for the injured Aiman Dardari.

== Personal life ==
Duarte holds dual Luxembourgish and Portuguese nationality. His older brother Clayton Duarte is also a professional footballer.
