= Rommi Siht =

Estonian footballer (born 2006)

Personal information
- Full name: Rommi Siht
- Date of birth: 30 June 2006 (age 20)
- Place of birth: Tallinn, Estonia
- Height: 6 ft 1 in (1.85 m)
- Position: Midfielder

Team information
- Current team: Nõmme Kalju
- Number: 26

Youth career
- 2012–2022: Nõmme Kalju

Senior career*
| Years | Team | Apps | (Gls) |
| 2022–2023 | Nõmme Kalju U21 | 64 | (7) |
| 2022– | Nõmme Kalju | 116 | (19) |

International career^{‡}
| 2024 | Estonia U19 | 10 | (2) |
| 2025– | Estonia U21 | 6 | (2) |
| 2026– | Estonia | 1 | (0) |
- * Club domestic league appearances and goals as of 17 November 2026 ‡ National team caps and goals as of 31 March 2026

Rommi Siht (born 30 June 2006) is an Estonian professional footballer who plays as a midfielder for Meistriliiga club Nõmme Kalju and the Estonia national team.

== Club career ==
=== Nõmme Kalju ===
Siht came through the youth system at Nõmme Kalju. He made his Meistriliiga debut on 29 July 2022, coming on as a 89th-minute substitute replacing Trevor Elhi in a 3–0 away win over Vaprus.

== International career ==
Siht has competed for the Estonia under-19s and under-21s.

On 20 March 2026, Siht was called up to the Estonia squad by manager Jürgen Henn for the 2026 FIFA Series matches in Rwanda. He made his senior debut on 30 March 2026 in a 2–0 defeat to Rwanda.

== Honours ==
Nõmme Kalju

- Estonian Cup: 2024–25
- Estonian Supercup: 2026
