= Jayson Videira =

Luxembourgish footballer (born 2005)

Personal information
- Full name: Jayson Videira Pereira
- Date of birth: 17 February 2005 (age 21)
- Height: 1.86 m (6 ft 1 in)
- Positions: Forward; winger

Team information
- Current team: Mainz 05 II
- Number: 9

Youth career
- 2013–2016: AS Hosingen
- 2017–2019: Young Boys Diekirch
- 2019–2020: Racing-Union
- 2020–2021: FF Norden 02
- 2022–2024: Hannover 96

Senior career*
Years	Team	Apps	(Gls)
2024–2025	Hannover 96 II	14	(1)
2025–	Mainz 05 II	27	(2)

International career^{‡}
2019	Luxembourg U15	1	(0)
2021–2022	Luxembourg U17	6	(1)
2022–2024	Luxembourg U19	10	(1)
2024–	Luxembourg U21	2	(0)
2024–	Luxembourg	9	(0)
- * Club domestic league appearances and goals as of 24 September 2026 ‡ National team caps and goals as of 16 November 2026

Jayson Videira Pereira (born 17 February 2005) is a Luxembourgish professional footballer who plays as a forward and winger for Regionalliga Südwest club Mainz 05 II and the Luxembourg national team.

== International career ==
Videira holds both Luxembourgish and Portuguese citizenships. He made his debut for the Luxembourg national team on 8 June 2024 in a friendly against Belgium at King Baudouin Stadium. He came on for Gerson Rodrigues in the 86th minute in the 3–0 defeat.
