= Djaoui Cissé =

French footballer (born 2004)

Personal information
- Date of birth: 31 January 2004 (age 22)
- Place of birth: Juvisy-sur-Orge, France
- Height: 1.88 m (6 ft 2 in)
- Position: Midfielder

Team information
- Current team: Rennes
- Number: 6

Youth career
- 2013–2017: US Grigny
- 2017–2019: Brétigny Foot CS
- 2019–2021: Rennes

Senior career*
Years	Team	Apps	(Gls)
2021–	Rennes II	53	(9)
2024–	Rennes	40	(1)

International career^{‡}
2025–	France U21	8	(4)
- * Club domestic league appearances and goals as of 19 May 2026 ‡ National team caps and goals as of 14 November 2025

Djaoui Cissé (born 31 January 2004) is a French professional footballer who plays as a midfielder for Ligue 1 club Rennes.

== Club career ==
A youth product of US Grigny, Cissé joined the youth academy of Rennes in 2019 and was promoted to their reserves in 2021. On 2 February 2024, he signed his first professional contract with Rennes until 2027. made his senior and professional debut with Rennes as a substitute in a 3–1 win over Clermont on 18 February 2024.

== International career ==
Born in France, Cissé is of Malian descent. He was called up to the France U21s for the 2025 UEFA European Under-21 Championship.
