= Mathys Tel =

French footballer (born 2005)

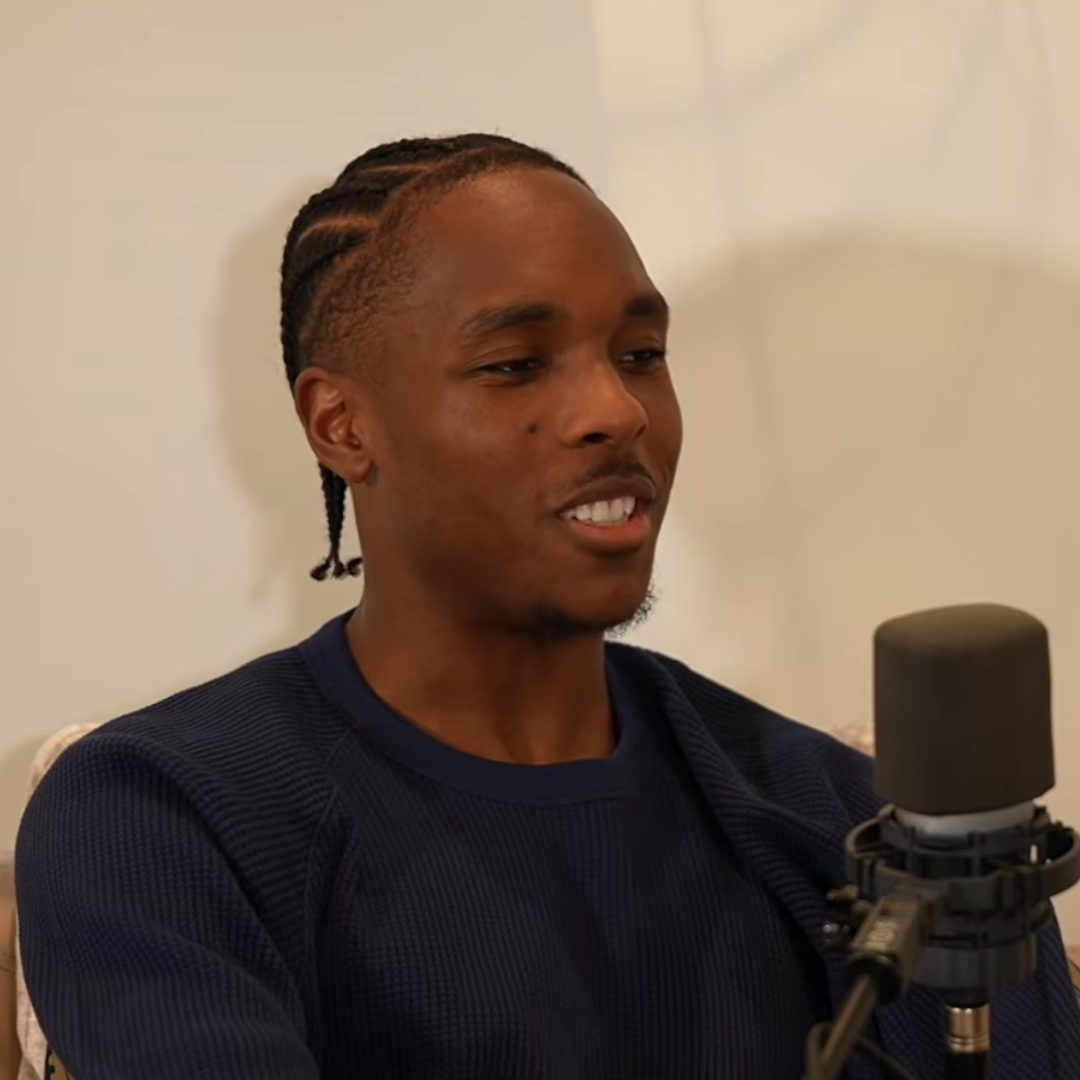
- Tel in 2026

Personal information
- Full name: Mathys Henri Tel
- Date of birth: 27 April 2005 (age 21)
- Place of birth: Sarcelles, France
- Height: 1.83 m (6 ft 0 in)
- Position: Forward

Team information
- Current team: Tottenham Hotspur
- Number: 11

Youth career
- 2012–2016: JS Villiers-le-Bel
- 2016–2017: Paris FC
- 2017–2019: AS Jeunesse Aubervilliers
- 2019–2020: Montrouge FC 92
- 2020–2021: Rennes

Senior career*
Years	Team	Apps	(Gls)
2021–2022	Rennes B	6	(6)
2021–2022	Rennes	7	(0)
2022–2025	Bayern Munich	60	(12)
2025	→ Tottenham Hotspur (loan)	13	(2)
2025–	Tottenham Hotspur	38	(5)

International career^{‡}
2022	France U17	9	(5)
2021–2023	France U18	11	(8)
2022–2024	France U19	12	(7)
2023–	France U21	24	(17)
Medal record
Men's football
Representing France
UEFA European Under-17 Championship
Winner	2022
- * Club domestic league appearances and goals as of 23:49, 31 October 2026 (UTC) ‡ National team caps and goals as of 23:30, 6 October 2026 (UTC)

Mathys Henri Tel (born 27 April 2005) is a French professional footballer who plays as a forward for Premier League club Tottenham Hotspur.

== Club career ==
=== Rennes ===
A former youth academy player of Paris FC, Tel joined Rennes in 2020. He made his professional debut on 15 August 2021 in a 1–1 league draw against Brest. His debut at 16 years and 110 days made him the youngest player to appear in an official match for Rennes, a record which was previously held by Eduardo Camavinga.

=== Bayern Munich ===
On 26 July 2022, Tel signed for Bundesliga club Bayern Munich on a four-year contract. The transfer fee paid to Rennes was of €28.5 million, bonuses included. On 31 August, he scored his first goal in a 5–0 win over Viktoria Köln in the DFB-Pokal, to become the youngest goalscorer for the club in a competitive match, aged 17 years and 126 days. He scored his first Bundesliga goal in a 2–2 draw against Stuttgart on 10 September, to be the youngest scorer for the club in that competition.

On 2 September 2023, he scored a late winner in a 2–1 away victory over Borussia Mönchengladbach, which ended a five-match winless streak against them. On 20 September, he scored his first Champions League goal in the second minute of stoppage time to secure a 4–3 win over Manchester United. On 3 October, he scored the winning goal in a 2–1 away victory over Copenhagen in his second consecutive Champions League match of the season. On 6 March 2024, he extended his contract at the club until 2029. He struggled for game time under coach Vincent Kompany at Bayern, making just two Bundesliga starts.

=== Tottenham Hotspur ===
On 3 February 2025, Tel was loaned to Premier League club Tottenham Hotspur for the remainder of the 2024–25 season, with an option of a permanent transfer for in summer. On 9 February, he scored his first goal for Tottenham in the stoppage time of a 2–1 away defeat against Aston Villa in the FA Cup. Two months later, on 6 April, he netted his maiden Premier League goal from a penalty in a 3–1 victory over Southampton. Tel also made five appearances for Tottenham in the 2024–25 UEFA Europa League and helped them win the competition, breaking a 17-year trophy drought for the club. On 15 June, Tottenham confirmed the permanent signing of Tel, on a deal running until 2031, for a reported fee of £30 million.

In September of that year, he was among the players omitted from the team's 2025–26 Champions League roster. On 4 October, he scored his first goal of the 2025–26 season in a 2–1 away win over Leeds United. Tel was added to the Champions League squad on 9 December 2025 as a replacement for the injured Dominic Solanke, but was dropped from the squad again in January 2026 to make room for Solanke's return. On 6 February, Tel was named in the squad available for the Champions League round of 16 onwards.

Tel's first goal of the 2026–27 season came on 24 October 2026, the second in a 2–0 win against rivals Chelsea.

== International career ==
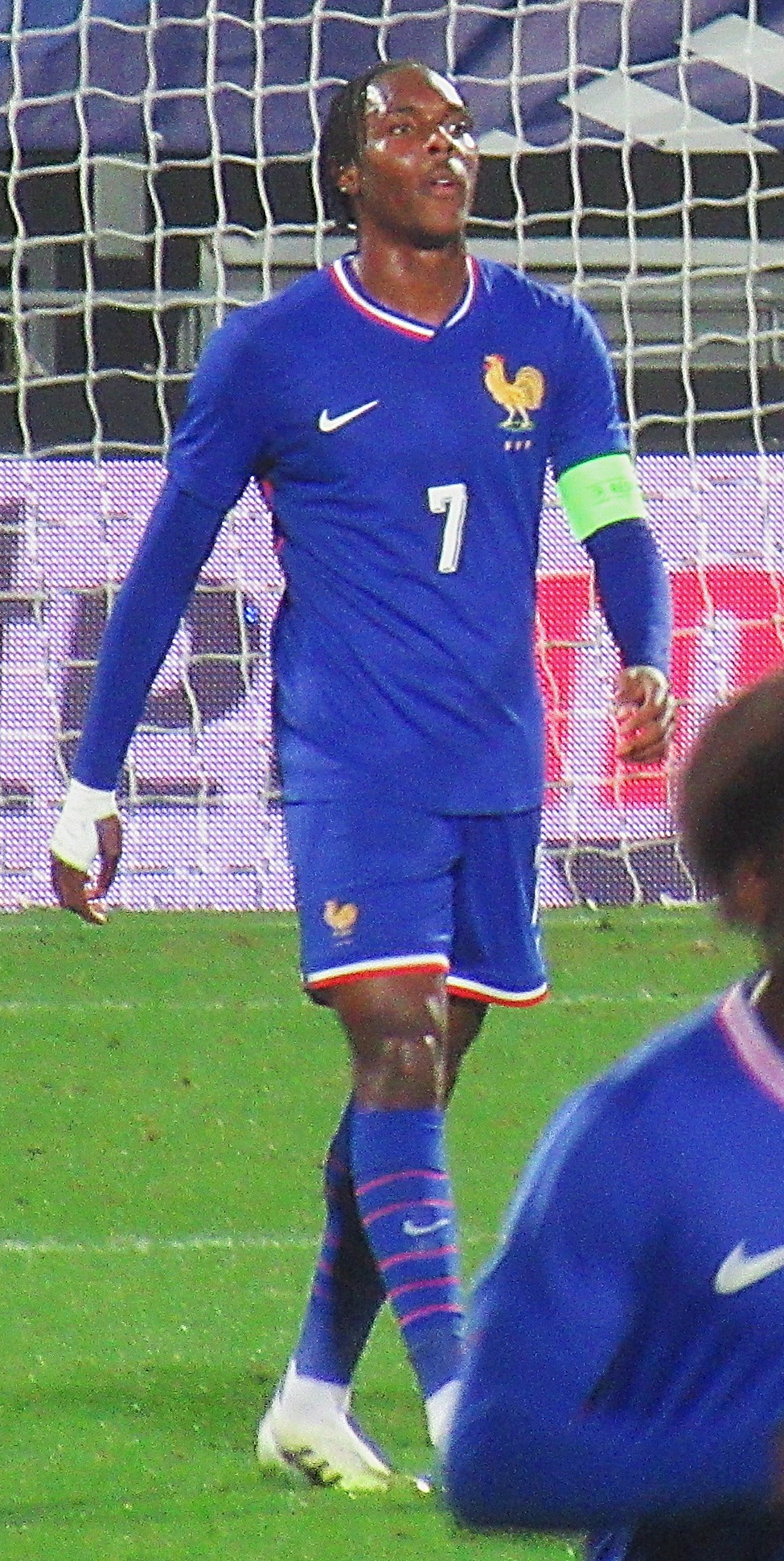
Tel with France in 2025

Tel is a French youth international, notably for the under-18s since September 2021, where he has proven to be a prolific goal scorer.

In May 2022, he was selected for the France under-17 team for the 2022 UEFA European Under-17 Championship in Israel. He established himself as a starter during the competition, serving as captain of the team on three occasions. He stood out by scoring three goals in the group stage: one goal against Poland, and a brace against Bulgaria. France qualified for the final after a penalty shootout against Portugal, with a 2–2 score at the end of regulation time. On 1 June 2022, with a 2–1 victory against the Netherlands, Tel won the 2022 Euros with the French under-17 team.

In May 2023, Tel's club Bayern Munich prevented his participation in the 2023 FIFA U-20 World Cup with the France under-20 team. His club also denied him permission to compete in the 2024 Summer Olympics on home soil.

== Style of play ==
Tel started his career as a centre-back and showcased a significant versatility early on. Tel has been able to play all positions throughout his career, however notably, during his early matches for both Rennes and the national youth teams, he has demonstrated proficiency as a winger, centre-forward, and attacking midfielder in the style of Anthony Martial.

== Sponsorship ==
Tel has been sponsored by Nike since he was 14 years old. His contract requires him to play and practice in Nike apparel (for which he can receive up to 10,000 euros per year). After he stopped wearing Nike gear in the summer of 2023, Tel was ordered to resume using them until mid-2024 due to his contract.

== Personal life ==
Born in Sarcelles, France, Tel is of Guadeloupean descent. In 2024, he was in a relationship with Indira Ampiot, Miss France 2023.

== Career statistics ==
As of match played 24 October 2026

Appearances and goals by club, season and competition
Club	Season	League			National cup (Note: Includes Coupe de France, DFB-Pokal, FA Cup)		League cup (Note: Includes EFL Cup)		Europe		Other		Total	
Club	Season	Division	Apps	Goals	Apps	Goals	Apps	Goals	Apps	Goals	Apps	Goals	Apps	Goals
Rennes B	2021–22	Championnat National 3	6	6	—		—		—		—		6	6
Rennes	2021–22	Ligue 1	7	0	1	0	—		2 (Note: Appearances in UEFA Europa Conference League)	0	—		10	0
Rennes	Total		13	6	1	0	—		2	0	—		16	6
Bayern Munich	2022–23	Bundesliga	22	5	1	1	—		5 (Note: Appearances in UEFA Champions League)	0	0	0	28	6
Bayern Munich	2023–24	Bundesliga	30	7	2	1	—		8	2	1 (Note: Appearance in DFL-Supercup)	0	41	10
Bayern Munich	2024–25	Bundesliga	8	0	3	0	—		3	0	—		14	0
Bayern Munich	Total		60	12	6	2	—		16	2	1	0	83	16
Tottenham Hotspur (loan)	2024–25	Premier League	13	2	1	1	1	0	5 (Note: Appearances in UEFA Europa League)	0	—		20	3
Tottenham Hotspur	2025–26	Premier League	31	4	1	0	2	0	3	0	1 (Note: Appearance in UEFA Super Cup)	0	38	4
Tottenham Hotspur	2026–27	Premier League	6	1	0	0	2	0	—		—		8	1
Tottenham Hotspur	Tottenham total		50	7	2	1	5	0	8	0	1	0	66	8
Career total			123	25	9	3	5	0	26	2	2	0	165	30

== Honours ==
Bayern Munich

- Bundesliga: 2022–23, 2024–25

Tottenham Hotspur

- UEFA Europa League: 2024–25

France U17

- UEFA European Under-17 Championship: 2022
