= Alessandro Vogt =

Swiss footballer (born 2005)

Personal information
- Date of birth: 3 February 2005 (age 21)
- Place of birth: Aargau, Switzerland
- Height: 1.88 m (6 ft 2 in)
- Position: Striker

Team information
- Current team: 1. FC Heidenheim; (on loan from TSG Hoffenheim)
- Number: 18

Youth career
- 2013–2019: FC Wohlen
- 2019–2020: FC Baden
- 2020–2021: Aarau

Senior career*
Years	Team	Apps	(Gls)
2021–2023	FC Wohlen	24	(6)
2023–2025	St. Gallen U21	59	(21)
2024–2026	St. Gallen	37	(15)
2026–	TSG Hoffenheim	0	(0)
2026–	→ 1. FC Heidenheim (loan)	2	(0)

International career^{‡}
2025–	Switzerland U21	6	(2)
- * Club domestic league appearances and goals as of 20 September 2026 ‡ National team caps and goals as of 1 May 2026

Alessandro Vogt (born 3 February 2005) is a Swiss professional footballer who plays as a striker for 2. Bundesliga club 1. FC Heidenheim, on loan from TSG Hoffenheim.

== Club career ==
Vogt is a product of the youth academies of the Swiss clubs FC Wohlen, FC Baden and Aarau. He returned to FC Wohlen in 2021 in the Swiss 1. Liga and signed his first professional contract with them on 18 July 2022 and was promoted to their senior team. He transferred to St. Gallen's reserves in 2023. For the 2024–25 season he scored 13 goals in 25 games with St. Gallen U21, and made 2 appearances with the senior team in the Swiss Super League. On 22 July 2025 he was formally promoted to St. Gallen's senior team and signed a professional contract until 2029.

On 9 March 2026, it was announced that Vogt will be transferring to TSG Hoffenheim in the summer. On 31 August 2026, he was loaned to 1. FC Heidenheim in the 2. Bundesliga, for the 2026–27 season.

== International career ==
Vogt was born in Switzerland to a Swiss father and Italian mother, and holds dual Swiss and Italian citizenship. He was called up to the Switzerland U21s for a set of friendlies in September 2025.

== Personal life ==
Four months before signing his first professional contract with St. Gallen, Vogt completed a commercial apprenticeship.

== Career statistics ==
=== Club ===
As of 20 September 2026

Appearances and goals by club, season and competition
Club	Season	League			National cup (Note: Includes Swiss Cup)		Continental		Other		Total	
Club	Season	Division	Apps	Goals	Apps	Goals	Apps	Goals	Apps	Goals	Apps	Goals
Wohlen	2021–22	1. Liga Classic	7	1	0	0	—		1 (Note: Appearance(s) in 1. Liga Classic Playoffs)	0	8	1
Wohlen	2022–23	1. Liga Classic	16	5	4	4	—		—		20	9
Wohlen	Total		23	6	4	4	0	0	1	0	28	10
St. Gallen U21	2022–23	Promotion League	9	1	—		—		—		9	1
St. Gallen U21	2023–24	Promotion League	25	7	—		—		—		25	7
St. Gallen U21	2024–25	1. Liga Classic	25	13	—		—		—		25	13
St. Gallen U21	Total		59	21	0	0	0	0	0	0	59	21
St. Gallen	2024–25	Swiss Super League	2	0	1	0	—		—		3	0
St. Gallen	2025–26	Swiss Super League	35	15	6	3	—		—		41	18
St. Gallen	Total		37	15	6	3	0	0	0	0	44	18
1899 Hoffenheim	2026–27	Bundesliga	0	0	0	0	0	0	—		0	0
1. FC Heidenheim (loan)	2026–27	2. Bundesliga	2	0	0	0	—		—		2	0
Career total			121	42	11	7	0	0	1	0	133	49
