= Fabio Lohei =

Luxembourgish footballer

Personal information
- Date of birth: 12 April 2005 (age 21)
- Place of birth: Niederkorn, Luxembourg
- Height: 1.76 m (5 ft 9 in)
- Position: Left-back

Team information
- Current team: Eintracht Trier 05

Youth career
- Differdange
- 2017–2018: Racing FC
- 2018–2022: Metz

Senior career*
Years	Team	Apps	(Gls)
2022–2025	Metz II	58	(1)
2025–	Eintracht Trier 05	24	(1)

International career^{‡}
2019	Luxembourg U15	1	(0)
2021–2022	Luxembourg U17	7	(0)
2022	Luxembourg U19	3	(0)
2022–	Luxembourg	4	(0)
- * Club domestic league appearances and goals as of 00:21, 6 June 2026 (UTC) ‡ National team caps and goals as of 22:26, 9 June 2024(UTC)

Fabio Lohei (born 12 April 2005) is a Luxembourgish footballer who plays as a left-back for German club Eintracht Trier 05 and the Luxembourg national team.

== Career ==
A youth product of Differdange and Racing FC, Lohei joined the youth academy of Metz in 2018. He was promoted to Metz reserves for the 2022–23 season.

== International career ==
Lohei is a youth international for Luxembourg, having played up to the Luxembourg U19s. He was called up to the senior Luxembourg national team for a set of matches in June 2022. He debuted with the senior Luxembourg in a friendly 2–2 tie with Hungary on 17 November 2022.
