= Corsin Konietzke =

German footballer (born 2006)

Personal information
- Date of birth: 21 June 2006 (age 20)
- Place of birth: Schwäbisch Hall, Germany
- Height: 1.85 m (6 ft 1 in)
- Position: Midfielder

Team information
- Current team: FC St. Gallen
- Number: 63

Youth career
- FC Landquart
- FC Ems
- 2021–2023: St. Gallen

Senior career*
Years	Team	Apps	(Gls)
2023–2024	St. Gallen II	34	(1)
2024–	St. Gallen	40	(2)

International career^{‡}
2021	Switzerland U16	2	(0)
2023	Switzerland U17	7	(0)
2023–2024	Switzerland U18	8	(1)
2024–2025	Switzerland U19	4	(0)
2025–	Switzerland U21	3	(1)
- * Club domestic league appearances and goals as of 28 September 2026 ‡ National team caps and goals as of 1 April 2026

Corsin Konietzke (born 21 June 2006) is a professional footballer who plays as a midfielder for Swiss Super League club FC St. Gallen. Born in Germany, he represents Switzerland internationally.

== Career ==
=== Club ===
Konietzke, who was born in Germany, played for FC Landquart and FC Ems as a youth. He joined FC St. Gallen at the age of 15 and played for the club's under 16 and under 18 teams. He made his first appearance for the St. Gallen second team on February 25, 2023, in a Promotion League game against FC Basel II. In the 2023–24 season, he was a regular starter in the Promotion League and also trained with the first team. He made his Super League debut on January 31, 2024, in a 0–2 loss to Servette FC. For the following 2024–25 season, Konietzke was permanently promoted to the first team. He scored his first goal for his club on November 28, 2024, in the league phase of the UEFA Conference League against TSC Bačka Topola.

=== National team ===
Konietzke was born in Germany to a German father and Swiss mother, and holds dual-citizenship. He is currently a member of the Swiss national youth squad. He represented the Swiss U17 team at the U-17 European Championship 2023, playing two group-stage matches before Switzerland were knocked out by Germany in the quarter-finals.
