= 2027 UEFA European Under-21 Championship qualification Group F =

Football tournament qualification stage

Group F of the 2027 UEFA European Under-21 Championship qualifying competition consists of six teams: Germany, Georgia, Greece, Northern Ireland, Latvia, and Malta. The composition of the nine groups in the qualifying group stage was decided by the draw held on 6 February 2025 at the UEFA headquarters in Nyon, Switzerland, with the teams seeded according to their coefficient ranking.

== Standings ==
Pos	Team	Pld	W	D	L	GF	GA	GD	Pts	Qualification	Germany	Greece		Georgia	Latvia	Malta
1	Germany	10	9	0	1	32	5	+27	27 (Note: Tied on head-to-head points (3). Head-to-head goal difference: Germany +1, Greece −1.)	Final tournament	—	2–3	3–0	2–0	5–0	6–0
2	Greece	10	9	0	1	29	6	+23	27	Play-offs	0–2	—	4–0	3–0	4–2	5–0
3	Northern Ireland	10	4	2	4	13	13	0	14		1–2	0–1	—	1–1	1–0	2–0
4	Georgia	10	2	4	4	13	15	−2	10		0–2	0–3	1–1	—	1–1	4–1
5	Latvia	10	2	2	6	8	20	−12	8		0–4	0–1	1–3	1–1	—	2–0
6	Malta	10	0	0	10	2	38	−36	0		1–4	0–5	0–4	0–5	0–1	—

Source: UEFA
Rules for classification: Tiebreakers

== Matches ==
Times are CET/CEST, (Note: CEST (UTC+2) for matches until 26 October 2025 and from 29 March 2026 (matchday 1–3 and 7–10), and CET (UTC+1) for matches from 26 October 2025 to 29 March 2026 (matchday 4–6).) as listed by UEFA (local times, if different, are in parentheses).

9 September 2025
18:00 (20:00 UTC+4)

Georgia	1–1	Northern Ireland
Sigua 7'	Report	Orr 66'

Ramaz Shengelia Stadium, Kutaisi
Attendance: 3,260
Referee: Kamal Umudlu (Azerbaijan)
9 September 2025
19:00

Malta	0–5	Greece
	Report	Pnevmonidis 14', 63'; Koutsias 45+2', 54'; Rallis 90'

Centenary Stadium, Ta' Qali
Attendance: 244
Referee: Milos Savovic (Montenegro)
9 September 2025
20:30

Germany	5–0	Latvia
Weiper 19'; Tresoldi 44', 50', 57'; Damar 59'	Report

Ostseestadion, Rostock
Attendance: 9,019
Referee: Łukasz Kuźma (Poland)

9 October 2025
20:45 (19:45 UTC+1)

Northern Ireland	2–0	Malta
Kirk 7'; Forbes 33'	Report

The Oval, Belfast
Attendance: 542
Referee: Alessandro Dudic (Switzerland)
10 October 2025
17:00 (18:00 UTC+3)

Latvia	1–1	Georgia
Patika 59'	Report	Bukia 62'

LNK Sporta Parks, Riga
Attendance: 312
Referee: Jérémy Muller (Luxembourg)
10 October 2025
18:00

Germany	2–3	Greece
Damar 54'; Rothe 59'	Report	Kostoulas 13'; Tzimas 14'; Rallis 81'

Ernst-Abbe-Sportfeld, Jena
Attendance: 7,830
Referee: Matteo Marcenaro (Italy)

14 October 2025
16:00 (17:00 UTC+3)

Latvia	0–1	Greece
	Report	Tzimas 83'

LNK Sporta Parks, Riga
Attendance: 380
Referee: Matthew MacDermid (Scotland)
14 October 2025
18:30 (17:30 UTC+1)

Northern Ireland	1–2	Germany
McConville 4'	Report	Ouédraogo 79'; Pejčinović 83' (pen.)

The Oval, Belfast
Attendance: 1,152
Referee: Patrik Kolarić (Croatia)
14 October 2025
19:00

Malta	0–5	Georgia
	Report	Kharebashvili 37'; Dadiani 44'; Tabatadze 68'; Narimanidze 71'; Basiladze 81'

Centenary Stadium, Ta' Qali
Attendance: 203
Referee: Johann Ingi Jonsson (Iceland)

13 November 2025
20:45 (19:45 UTC+0)

Northern Ireland	1–0	Latvia
Glenfield 60'	Report

The Oval, Belfast
Attendance: 487
Referee: Ivar Orri Kristjansson (Iceland)
14 November 2025
16:00 (17:00 UTC+2)

Greece	3–0	Georgia
Tzimas 44' (pen.); Kalogeropoulos 45+1'; Keramitsis 79'	Report

Leoforos Alexandras Stadium, Athens
Attendance: 2,997
Referee: Viktor Kopiievskyi (Ukraine)
14 November 2025
18:00

Germany	6–0	Malta
Bischof 9', 63', 65'; Karl 37', 67'; Damar 86'	Report

Sportpark Ronhof Thomas Sommer, Fürth
Attendance: 7,729
Referee: David Fuxman (Israel)

18 November 2025
15:00 (16:00 UTC+2)

Greece	4–0	Northern Ireland
Alexiou 19'; Goumas 26'; Tzimas 63' (pen.); Smyrlis 81'	Report

Levadia Municipal Stadium, Livadeia
Attendance: 2,433
Referee: Alejandro Muñiz Ruiz (Spain)
18 November 2025
18:00 (21:00 UTC+4)

Georgia	0–2	Germany
	Report	Karl 45+2'; Tresoldi 58'

Mikheil Meskhi Stadium, Tbilisi
Attendance: 2,357
Referee: Ashot Ghaltakhchyan (Armenia)
18 November 2025
19:00

Malta	0–1	Latvia
	Report	Cēsnieks 60'

Centenary Stadium, Ta' Qali
Attendance: 148
Referee: Mehmet Türkmen (Turkey)

27 March 2026
16:00 (19:00 UTC+4)

Georgia	1–1	Latvia
Yegoian 85'	Report	Strods 53'

Ramaz Shengelia Stadium, Kutaisi
Attendance: 1,390
Referee: Konstantinos Fellas (Cyprus)
27 March 2026
17:00 (18:00 UTC+2)

Greece	5–0	Malta
Goumas 16'; Koutsias 23', 61' (pen.), 79'; Kaloskamis 49'	Report

Levadia Municipal Stadium, Livadeia
Attendance: 1,343
Referee: Cláudio Pereira (Portugal)
27 March 2026
18:00

Germany	3–0	Northern Ireland
Tresoldi 11' (pen.), 41'; Weiper 90'	Report

Eintracht-Stadion, Braunschweig
Attendance: 10,391
Referee: Jakob Sundberg (Denmark)

31 March 2026
13:00 (14:00 UTC+3)

Latvia	1–3	Northern Ireland
Mežsargs 14'	Report	Kirk 29'; Kenny 68'; Moses 90+5'

Daugava Stadium, Riga
Attendance: 145
Referee: Sandi Putros (Denmark)
31 March 2026
16:00 (18:00 UTC+4)

Georgia	4–1	Malta
Tsulukidze 9'; Sigua 21', 78'; Narimanidze 42'	Report	Ellul 2'

Ramaz Shengelia Stadium, Kutaisi
Attendance: 3,125
Referee: Seth Galia (Gibraltar)
31 March 2026
18:00 (19:00 UTC+3)

Greece	0–2	Germany
	Report	El Mala 11'; Kade 73'

Leoforos Alexandras Stadium, Athens
Attendance: 4,835
Referee: Marc Nagtegaal (Netherlands)

26 September 2026
17:00 (19:00 UTC+4)

Georgia	0–3	Greece
	Report	Allen 6'; Bakoulas 13'; Pnevmonidis 65'

Mikheil Meskhi Stadium, Tbilisi
Attendance: 1,549
Referee: Yura Mahtesyan (Armenia)
26 September 2026
18:00 (19:00 UTC+3)

Latvia	0–4	Germany
	Report	Brunner 2', 42'; Tresoldi 52'; Ibrahimović 76'

Daugava Stadium, Riga
Attendance: 850
Referee: Vasil Minev (Bulgaria)
26 September 2026
19:00

Malta	0–4	Northern Ireland
	Report	Kearney 31'; Patterson 43', 63'; McCann 73'

Centenary Stadium, Ta' Qali
Attendance: 203
Referee: Ioannis Christodoulou (Cyprus)

30 September 2026
18:00

Malta	1–4	Germany
Tuma 9'	Report	Tresoldi 12', 47', 69'; Rothe 32'

Centenary Stadium, Ta' Qali
Attendance: 1,012
Referee: Ozan Ergün (Turkey)
1 October 2026
17:00 (18:00 UTC+3)

Greece	4–2	Latvia
Almyras 5', 37'; Kostoulas 17', 53'	Report	Patrikejevs 28'; Lizunovs 90+2'

Levadia Municipal Stadium, Livadeia
Attendance: 793
Referee: Tural Kurbanov (Azerbaijan)
1 October 2026
20:45 (19:45 UTC+1)

Northern Ireland	1–1	Georgia
Brannigan 72'	Report	Doltmourziev 54'

Ballymena Showgrounds, Ballymena
Attendance: 414
Referee: Dovydas Švėgžda (Lithuania)

6 October 2026
18:00 (19:00 UTC+3)

Latvia	2–0	Malta
Romanovs 51'; Lizunovs 60'	Report

Daugava Stadium, Riga
Attendance: 185
Referee: Antoine Chiaramonti (Andorra)
6 October 2026
18:00

Germany	2–0	Georgia
Pejčinović 10', 69'	Report

Bielefelder Alm, Bielefeld
Attendance: 20,049
Referee: Florian Lata (Albania)
6 October 2026
18:00 (17:00 UTC+1)

Northern Ireland	0–1	Greece
	Report	Mythou 32'

Mourneview Park, Lurgan
Attendance: 459
Referee: Mohammad Usman Aslam (Norway)

== Goalscorers ==
There were 96 goals scored in 30 matches, for an average of 3.2 goals per match.

10 goals

- (Germany national under-21 football team) Nicolò Tresoldi

5 goals

- (Greece national under-21 football team) Georgios Koutsias

4 goals

- (Greece national under-21 football team) Stefanos Tzimas

3 goals

- (Georgia national under-21 football team) Gabriel Sigua
- (Germany national under-21 football team) Tom Bischof
- (Germany national under-21 football team) Muhammed Damar
- (Germany national under-21 football team) Lennart Karl
- (Greece national under-21 football team) Konstantinos Kostoulas
- (Greece national under-21 football team) Stavros Pnevmonidis

2 goals

- (Georgia national under-21 football team) Aleksandre Narimanidze
- (Germany national under-21 football team) Paris Brunner
- (Germany national under-21 football team) Dženan Pejčinović
- (Germany national under-21 football team) Tom Rothe
- (Germany national under-21 football team) Nelson Weiper
- (Greece national under-21 football team) Christos Almyras
- (Greece national under-21 football team) Konstantinos Goumas
- (Greece national under-21 football team) Dimitris Rallis
- (Latvia national under-21 football team) Valerijs Lizunovs
- (Northern Ireland national under-21 football team) Makenzie Kirk

1 goal

- (Georgia national under-21 football team) Aleko Basiladze
- (Georgia national under-21 football team) Dato Bukia
- (Georgia national under-21 football team) Nikoloz Dadiani
- (Georgia national under-21 football team) Halid Doltmourziev
- (Georgia national under-21 football team) Saba Kharebashvili
- (Georgia national under-21 football team) Giorgi Tabatadze
- (Georgia national under-21 football team) Luka Tsulukidze
- (Georgia national under-21 football team) Irakli Yegoian
- (Germany national under-21 football team) Noah Darvich
- (Germany national under-21 football team) Said El Mala
- (Germany national under-21 football team) Arijon Ibrahimović
- (Germany national under-21 football team) Anton Kade
- (Germany national under-21 football team) Assan Ouédraogo
- (Greece national under-21 football team) Christos Alexiou
- (Greece national under-21 football team) Noah Allen
- (Greece national under-21 football team) Theofanis Bakoulas
- (Greece national under-21 football team) Alexios Kalogeropoulos
- (Greece national under-21 football team) Dimitris Kaloskamis
- (Greece national under-21 football team) Dimitrios Keramitsis
- (Greece national under-21 football team) Anestis Mythou
- (Greece national under-21 football team) Lampros Smyrlis
- (Latvia national under-21 football team) Kevins Cēsnieks
- (Latvia national under-21 football team) Kristiāns Mežsargs
- (Latvia national under-21 football team) Gleb Patika
- (Latvia national under-21 football team) Ivans Patrikejevs
- (Latvia national under-21 football team) Kristaps Romanovs
- (Latvia national under-21 football team) Markuss Strods
- (Malta national under-21 football team) Mattias Ellul
- (Malta national under-21 football team) Basil Tuma
- (Northern Ireland national under-21 football team) Cole Brannigan
- (Northern Ireland national under-21 football team) Michael Forbes
- (Northern Ireland national under-21 football team) Samuel Glenfield
- (Northern Ireland national under-21 football team) Shea Kearney
- (Northern Ireland national under-21 football team) Eoin Kenny
- (Northern Ireland national under-21 football team) Bayley McCann
- (Northern Ireland national under-21 football team) Ruairi McConville
- (Northern Ireland national under-21 football team) Devlan Moses
- (Northern Ireland national under-21 football team) Matthew Orr
- (Northern Ireland national under-21 football team) Jack Patterson
