= Georgia national under-21 football team =

Georgia Under-21
- Nickname(s): ჯვაროსნები Jvarosnebi (Crusaders)
- Association: Georgian Football Federation
- Confederation: UEFA
- Head coach: Giorgi Adamia (caretaker)
- Captain: Gabriel Sigua
- Most caps: Saba Khvadagiani (31 games)
- Top scorer: Giorgi Guliashvili (8 goals)
- FIFA code: GEO
First colours	Second colours	Third colours

First international
- (Georgia (country)) Georgia 3–0 Moldova (Tbilisi, 27 May 1994)

Biggest win
- (Georgia (country)) Georgia 7–1 Malaysia (Vienna, 26 March 2013)

Biggest defeat
- Ukraine 6–0 Georgia (Georgia (country)) (Chervonohrad, 12 October 2004)

UEFA U-21 Championship
- Appearances: 2 (first in 2023)
- Best result: Quarter-finals (2023)
- Website: nakrebi.ge

The Georgia national under-21 football team is the national under-21 football team of Georgia and is controlled by the Georgian Football Federation. It is considered to be the feeder team for the senior Georgian national football team. The team competes in the European Under-21 Championship, held every two years.

The current team is for Georgian players aged under 21 at the start of the calendar year in which a two-year European Championship campaign begins, so some players can remain with the squad until the age of 23. As long as they are eligible, players can play for Georgia at any level, making it possible to play for the U21s, senior side, and again for the U21s. This has been the case for several senior team players like Jano Ananidze and Levan Kakubava.

Although the breakup of the Soviet Union occurred officially on 25 December 1991, the under-21 team continued as Soviet Union until the 1992 UEFA European Under-21 Football Championship. After that, Georgia and the other countries who split from the Soviet Union like Armenia, Azerbaijan, Belarus, Estonia, Latvia, Lithuania, Moldova and Ukraine became separate footballing entities.

Georgia held its first official game in a 1996 UEFA European U21 Championship qualification campaign against Moldova. They made a debut in the final tournament of the UEFA European Under-21 Championship in 2023 for which they automatically qualified as a co-host nation.

Despite the lowest rating points among the 2023 Championship teams, Georgia produced a main surprise on the tournament. They finished the group on top of the table and remained unbeaten after 120 minutes of a quarter-final clash with Israel as well, before eventually losing on penalties.

Georgia fought hard to qualify for the 2025 Championship. As runners-up of Group C, they beat Croatia after a dramatic penalty shoot-out in play-offs.

Georgia U21s do not have a permanent home ground and play at stadiums of Erovnuli Liga clubs across the country. The record attendance for their match was set on 1 July 2023 when Georgia played Israel in quarter-final of the European Championship in front of 44,338 spectators.

== Competitive record ==
=== UEFA European U-21 Championship ===
Year	Round	Pld	W	D*	L	GF	GA
(Georgia (country)) (Romania) 2023	1/4 finals	4	1	3	0	5	3
(Slovakia) 2025	Group	3	1	0	2	4	8

Note:

*Draws include knockout matches decided on penalty kicks.

==== Qualification ====
Runners-up Third place Tournament held on home soil

Year	Group	Pld	W	D	L	GF	GA
(Spain) 1996	Group 7	8	1	0	7	7	17
(Romania) 1998	Group 2	8	3	3	2	10	10
(Slovakia) 2000	Group 2	8	2	5	3	11	13
(Switzerland) 2002	Group 8	8	1	0	7	9	17
(Germany) 2004	Group 10	8	1	2	5	7	16
(Portugal) 2006	Group 2	12	3	2	7	7	22
(Netherlands) 2007	Group 3	2	0	0	2	1	4
(Sweden) 2009	Group 4	8	2	0	6	6	22
(Denmark) 2011	Group 2	10	4	3	3	12	9
(Israel) 2013	Group 5	8	3	1	4	8	18
(Czech Republic) 2015	Group 3	8	3	1	4	8	15
(Poland) 2017	Group 6	10	4	1	5	17	17
(Italy) (San Marino) 2019	Group 3	8	3	3	4	11	19
(Hungary) (Slovenia) 2021	Group 2	10	5	0	5	17	14
(Georgia (country)) (Romania) 2023	Qualified as hosts						
(Slovakia) 2025	Group C	10	6	1	3	14	10 (Note: Qualified after a play-off victory over Croatia)
(Albania) (Serbia) 2027	Group F	10	2	4	4	13	15

== Results and fixtures ==
Win Draw Loss

=== 2025 ===
14 November 2025 2027 UEFA Euro QR	Greece	3–0	Georgia	Athens
19:00	Tzimas 44' (pen.); Kalogeropoulos 45+1'; Keramitsis 79'	Report		Stadium: Leoforos Alexandras Stadium; Attendance: 4,000; Referee: Viktor Kopiievskyi (Ukraine)

18 November 2025 2027 UEFA Euro QR	Georgia	0–2	Germany	Tbilisi
21:00		Report	Karl 45+2'; Tresoldi 58'	Stadium: Mikheil Meskhi Stadium; Attendance: 2,357; Referee: Ashot Ghaltakhchyan (Armenia)

=== 2026 ===
27 March 2026 2027 UEFA Euro QR	Georgia	1–1	Latvia	Kutaisi
19:00	Gvasalia (red card) 42'; Yegoyan 85'	Report	Strods 53'	Stadium: Ramaz Shengelia Stadium; Attendance: 1,390; Referee: Konstantinos Fellas (Cyprus)

31 March 2026 2027 UEFA Euro QR	Georgia	4–1	Malta	Kutaisi
18:00	Tsulukidze 9'; Sigua 21', 78'; Narimanidze 42'	Report	Ellul 2'	Stadium: Ramaz Shengelia Stadium; Attendance: 3,125; Referee: Seth Galia (Gibraltar)

5 June 2026 Friendly	United States U20	1–0	Georgia	Blagoevgrad
18:30	Jamison 80'		Narimanidze (penalty missed) '40	Stadium: Stadion Hristo Botev

9 June 2026 Friendly	Moldova	3–2	Georgia	Nisporeni
20:00	Lupan 45+2' (pen.); Luchita 47'; Radu 62'		Kokhreidze 70'; Grigalava 73'

26 September 2026 2027 UEFA Euro QR	Georgia	0–3	Greece	Tbilisi
19:00		Report	Allen 5' Bakoulas 13' Pnevmonidis 65'	Stadium: Mikheil Meskhi Stadium; Attendance: 1,549; Referee: Yura Mahtesyan (Armenia)

1 October 2026 2027 UEFA Euro QR	Northern Ireland	1–1	Georgia	Ballymena
22:45	Brannigan 72'	Report	Doltmurziev 54'	Stadium: The Showgrounds; Attendance: 414; Referee: Dovydas Švėgžda (Lithuania)

6 October 2026 2027 UEFA Euro QR	Germany	2–0	Georgia	Bielefeld
20:00	Pejčinović 10', 69'	Report		Stadium: Bielefelder Alm; Attendance: 20,049; Referee: Florian Lata (Albania)

=== 2027 European Championship ===
Pos	Team	Pld	W	D	L	GF	GA	GD	Pts	Qualification	Germany	Greece		Georgia	Latvia	Malta
1	Germany	10	9	0	1	32	5	+27	27 (Note: Tied on head-to-head points (3). Head-to-head goal difference: Germany +1, Greece −1.)	Final tournament	—	2–3	3–0	2–0	5–0	6–0
2	Greece	10	9	0	1	29	6	+23	27	Play-offs	0–2	—	4–0	3–0	4–2	5–0
3	Northern Ireland	10	4	2	4	13	13	0	14		1–2	0–1	—	1–1	1–0	2–0
4	Georgia	10	2	4	4	13	15	−2	10		0–2	0–3	1–1	—	1–1	4–1
5	Latvia	10	2	2	6	8	20	−12	8		0–4	0–1	1–3	1–1	—	2–0
6	Malta	10	0	0	10	2	38	−36	0		1–4	0–5	0–4	0–5	0–1	—

Source: UEFA

== Current team ==
=== Coaching staff ===
As of 26 September 2026

Position	Name
Head Coach	(Georgia (country)) Giorgi Adamia (caretaker)
Assistant coach	(Georgia (country)) Zaur Svanadze (Georgia (country)) Giorgi Dekanosidze
Goalkeeper coach	(Georgia (country)) Temur Charkviani
Fitness coach	(Georgia (country)) Bondo Gotsiridze
Video analyst	(Georgia (country)) Jumber Burjanadze

=== Players ===
The following players born in or after 2004 were called up for 2027 UEFA European Championship qualifying matches against Greece, N.Ireland and Germany, played respectively on 26 September, 1 October and 6 October 2026.

Note: Names in italics denote players that have been called up to the senior team.

Caps and goals correct as of 6 October 2026, after the match against Germany.

No.	Pos.	Player	Date of birth (age)	Caps	Goals	Club
1	GK	Mikheil Makatsaria	11 June 2004 (age 22)	6	0	(Georgian Football Federation) Dinamo Tbilisi
12	GK	Giorgi Kavlashvili	24 January 2007 (age 19)	1	0	(Royal Belgian Football Association) Union SG
23	GK	Papuna Beruashvili	21 March 2004 (age 22)	7	0	(Georgian Football Federation) Rustavi
2	DF	Rati Grigalava	22 June 2006 (age 20)	2	1	(Lithuanian Football Federation) Suduva
3	DF	Davit Bukia	27 July 2005 (age 21)	10	1	(Georgian Football Federation) Torpedo
4	DF	Aleksandre Narimanidze	3 June 2005 (age 21)	10	2	(Slovak Football Association) Žilina
5	DF	Aleksandre Amisulashvili	9 March 2007 (age 19)	7	0	(Georgian Football Federation) Iberia 1999
15	DF	Luka Latsabidze	18 March 2004 (age 22)	7	0	(Georgian Football Federation) Torpedo Kutaisi
16	DF	Nikoloz Tsetskhladze	29 October 2005 (age 21)	6	0	(Georgian Football Federation) Samgurali
17	DF	Akaki Giunashvili	1 March 2005 (age 21)	7	0	(Georgian Football Federation) Kolkheti 1913
21	DF	Mukhran Bagrationi	13 February 2004 (age 22)	0	0	(Austrian Football Association) Kapfenberger SV
	DF	Nikoloz Chikovani	1 March 2005 (age 21)	1	0	(Georgian Football Federation) Rustavi
6	MF	Dachi Lortkipanidze	3 August 2005 (age 21)	10	0	(Italian Football Federation) US Cremonese
8	MF	Giorgi Robakidze	30 June 2005 (age 21)	4	0	(Ukrainian Association of Football) Chornomorets
10	MF	Nikoloz Dadiani	8 December 2004 (age 21)	12	1	(Georgian Football Federation) Iberia 1999
14	MF	Aleko Basiladze	4 March 2006 (age 20)	8	1	(Football Association of the Czech Republic) Slovan Liberec
18	MF	Alekandre Peikrishvili	14 June 2006 (age 20)	1	0	(Georgian Football Federation) Gagra
20	MF	Guram Japaridze	15 August 2005 (age 21)	8	0	(Georgian Football Federation) Dinamo Batumi
7	FW	Vakhtang Salia	30 August 2007 (age 19)	4	0	(The Football Association) Newcastle United
9	FW	Diego Deisadze	15 October 2004 (age 22)	12	0	(Georgian Football Federation) Torpedo
11	FW	Nikoloz Chikovani	21 June 2007 (age 19)	6	0	(The Football Association) Watford
13	FW	Halid Doltmurziev	22 May 2007 (age 19)	2	1	(Georgian Football Federation) Dinamo Tbilisi
19	FW	George Chubinidze	9 November 2007 (age 18)	1	0	(The Football Association) AFC Bournemouth
22	FW	Tornike Kvaratskhelia	7 February 2010 (age 16)	3	0	(Georgian Football Federation) Dinamo Tbilisi

=== Recent call-up ===
The following players have been called up within the last twelve months and are still eligible for selection.

Pos.	Player	Date of birth (age)	Caps	Goals	Club	Latest call-up
GK	Revaz Kurtanidze	11 January 2005 (age 21)	0	0	(Georgia (country)) Iberia 1999	v.Malta, 31 March 2026
GK	Saba Kajaia	23 August 2005 (age 21)	0	0	(Spain) Real Murcia	v.Germany, 18 November 2025
DF	Giorgi Tabatadze	29 October 2005 (age 21)	8	1	(Denmark) Vejle	v.Moldova, 9 June 2026
DF	Giorgi Gvasalia	28 June 2005 (age 21)	3	0	(Georgia (country)) Dinamo Tbilisi	v.Malta, 31 March 2026
DF	Saba Kharebashvili	3 September 2008 (age 18)	7	1	(Georgia (country)) Dinamo Tbilisi	v.Greece, 26 September 2026 ^{SEN}
DF	Otar Chochia	18 November 2006 (age 19)	0	0	(Georgia (country)) Gagra	v.Germany, 18 November 2025
DF	George Karseladze	18 May 2005 (age 21)	4	0	(Portugal) Académica de Coimbra	v.Germany, 18 November 2025
DF	Gela Sadgobelashvili	19 January 2005 (age 21)	0	0	(Georgia (country)) Dinamo Tbilisi	v.Malta, 14 October 2025
MF	Luka Tsulukidze	8 February 2004 (age 22)	7	1	(Georgia (country)) Dinamo Batumi	v.Greece, 26 September 2026 ^{INJ}
MF	Giorgi Kokhreidze	4 March 2006 (age 20)	2	1	(Georgia (country)) Dinamo Batumi	v.Moldova, 9 June 2026
MF	Daniel Kvartskhava	15 July 2006 (age 20)	2	0	(Georgia (country)) Dinamo Tbilisi	v.Moldova, 9 June 2026
MF	Tsotne Berelidze	24 March 2006 (age 20)	1	0	(Georgia (country)) Dinamo Tbilisi	v.Moldova, 9 June 2026
MF	Gia Nadareishvili	3 March 2005 (age 21)	0	0	(Slovakia) Trencin	v.Malta, 31 March 2026
MF	Irakli Yegoian	19 March 2004 (age 22)	18	1	(Netherlands) Excelsior	v.Malta, 31 March 2026
MF	Gabriel Sigua	30 June 2005 (age 21)	15	4	(Switzerland) Lausanne Sport	v.Malta, 31 March 2026
MF	Giorgi Kharebava	26 February 2004 (age 22)	1	0	(Georgia (country)) Kolkheti 1913	v.Germany, 18 November 2025
FW	Luka Parkadze	6 April 2005 (age 21)	8	0	Austria Salzburg	v.Moldova, 9 June 2026
FW	Dimitri Gurtskaia	4 February 2004 (age 22)	3	0	(Georgia (country)) Meshakhte	v.Moldova, 9 June 2026
FW	Andria Bartishvili	30 March 2009 (age 17)	2	0	(Georgia (country)) Iberia 1999	v.Malta, 31 March 2026
FW	Saba Gegiadze	21 January 2004 (age 22)	1	0	(Georgia (country)) Spaeri	v.Malta, 31 March 2026
FW	Teimuraz Odikadze	28 March 2006 (age 20)	1	0	(Georgia (country)) Dinamo Tbilisi	v.Malta, 14 October 2025
FW	Davit Gotsiridze	6 September 2004 (age 22)	7	0	(Georgia (country)) Dila	v.Germany, 18 November 2025

=== Past squads ===
- 2023 UEFA European Championship squad
- 2025 UEFA European Championship squad

== Statistics ==
=== Most capped players ===
Last updated: 24 April 2026

#	Name	Career	Caps	Goals
1	Saba Khvadagiani	2023–2025	31	3
2	Giorgi Kvernadze	2022–2025	24	2
2	Otar Mamageishvili	2022–2025	24	3
4	Luka Gagnidze	2021–2025	23	1
5	Nodar Lominadze	2022–2025	21	4

=== Leading goalscorers ===
Last updated: 24 April 2026

#	Player	Career	Goals	Caps	Ratio
1	Giorgi Guliashvili	2020–2023	8	20	2.5
2	Nika Kacharava	2013–2016	7	11	1.57
3	Giorgi Arabidze	2017–2019	6	13	2.17

=== Record against opponent ===
Last update: 7 October 2026

Note: Includes friendly matches

Opponent	Matches	Wins	Draws	Losses
Albania	8	3	1	4
Armenia	2	1	0	1
Azerbaijan	3	2	1	0
Belarus	2	1	0	1
Belgium	1	0	1	0
Bulgaria	3	0	0	3
Croatia	6	2	2	2
Cyprus	3	1	2	0
Denmark	5	0	1	4
England	4	1	1	2
Estonia	7	6	0	1
Faroe Islands	2	1	0	1
Finland	3	2	1	0
France	4	0	0	4
Germany	6	0	1	5
Gibraltar	2	2	0	0
Greece	8	0	2	6
Hungary	2	0	0	2
Iceland	2	1	1	0
Republic of Ireland	4	0	4	0
Israel	4	1	1	2
Italy	4	1	0	3
Kazakhstan	5	2	1	2
Latvia	6	4	2	0
Liechtenstein	2	2	0	0
Lithuania	6	3	1	2
Luxembourg	2	1	0	1*
Malta	5	5	0	0
Moldova	9	5	2	2
Montenegro	2	0	1	1
Netherlands	5	1	1	3
Northern Ireland	3	0	3	0
North Macedonia	2	2	0	0
Norway	2	0	1	1
Poland	7	2	1	4
Portugal	3	1	0	2
Romania	6	1	1	4
Russia	4	1	0	3
San Marino	2	2	0	0
Scotland	2	1	1	0
Serbia	2	1	0	1
Slovakia	4	1	0	3
Slovenia	4	1	3	0
Spain	6	0	0	6
Switzerland	8	0	1	7
Sweden	4	0	2	2
Turkey	6	2	1	3
Ukraine	5	0	3	2
Wales	4	0	2	2
Total	201	63	46	92

- Luxemburg were awarded a 3–0 win

== Notable results ==
Date	Tournament	Venue	Team	Result	Team
10 September 1997	Euro 1998	Rustavi	Georgia	2–0	Italy
10 October 1997	Euro 1998	Tbilisi	Georgia	5–1	Poland
20 November 2007	Euro 2009	Tbilisi	Georgia	2–0	Russia
9 September 2009	Euro 2011	Zestaponi	Georgia	4–0	Turkey
3 June 2011	Euro 2013	Dugopolje	Croatia	0–1	Georgia
4 September 2014	Euro 2015	Deventer	Netherlands	0–1	Georgia
16 November 2021	Friendly	Batumi	Georgia	3–2	England
21 June 2023	Euro 2023	Tbilisi	Georgia	2–0	Portugal

== Notable former players ==
- Akaki Khubutia
- Aleksandre Amisulashvili
- Alexander Guruli
- Alexander Kobakhidze
- Davit Devdariani
- Dato Kvirkvelia
- David Targamadze
- George Popkhadze
- Giorgi Loria
- Giorgi Makaridze
- Gogita Gogua
- Gulverd Tomashvili
- Guram Kashia
- Jaba Kankava
- Jaba Lipartia
- Jano Ananidze
- Kakha Kaladze
- Levan Kakubava
- Levan Kenia
- Levan Mchedlidze
- Mate Vatsadze
- Murtaz Daushvili
- Nika Dzalamidze
- Nukri Revishvili
- Otar Martsvaladze
- Roin Kvaskhvadze
- Shota Grigalashvili
- Solomon Kvirkvelia
- Tornike Okriashvili
- Ucha Lobjanidze
- Valeri Kazaishvili
- Vladimir Dvalishvili
- Zurab Khizanishvili

== Managerial history ==
- (Georgia (country)) Shota Cheishvili (1994–97)
- (Georgia (country)) Vladimir Gutsaev (1997–1998)
- (Georgia (country)) Gigla Imnadze (1998–1999)
- (Georgia (country)) Murtaz Khurtsilava (1999–2001)
- (Georgia (country)) Vakhtang Kopaleishvili (2001–2003)
- (Georgia (country)) Revaz Arveladze (2003–2004)
- (Georgia (country)) Gocha Tkebuchava (2004–2005)
- (Georgia (country)) Koba Zhorzhikashvili (2005–2006)
- (Germany) Ralf Minge (2006–2007)
- (Croatia) Petar Segrt (2007–2009)
- (Georgia (country)) Kakha Tskhadadze (2009)
- (Georgia (country)) Otar Gabelia (2009–2011)
- (Georgia (country)) Soso Chedia (2011–2012)
- (Georgia (country)) Aleksandre Chivadze (2012–2016)
- (Georgia (country)) Gia Geguchadze (2016–2017)
- (Georgia (country)) Giorgi Tsetsadze (2017–2019)
- (Georgia (country)) Vasil Maisuradze (2020)
- (Georgia (country)) Ramaz Svanadze (2021–2026)

== Media coverage ==
Georgia Euro qualifiers and international friendlies are usually shown by the Public Broadcaster. The 2025 UEFA European Under-21 Championship will be broadcast by the Setanta Sports.

== See also ==
- Georgian national football team
- U19 team
- U17 team
