= 2007 UEFA European Under-21 Championship qualification =

Football tournament qualification stage

Qualifying for the 2007 UEFA European Under-21 Championship began in May 2006.

Netherlands qualify as hosts and are exempt from qualifying. Of UEFA's 52 member countries, only the Faroe Islands chose not to compete. That left 50 nations attempting to qualify for the 7 remaining spots at the finals.

The competition's structure is as follows:

1. The 16 lowest ranked nations played-off (on a home-and-away basis) before the qualifying group stage, to eliminate 8 teams.
2. The remaining 42 teams formed 14 three-team groups, each team playing one home match and one away match.
3. The 14 group winners played-off (on a home-and-away basis) to decide the seven qualifying nations.

== Preliminary round ==
Teams went into the preliminary round already knowing who they would face should they get through.

Team 1	Agg.	Team 2	1st leg	2nd leg
Estonia	1–7	Wales	0–2	1–5
Malta	2–4	Georgia	1–2	1–2
San Marino	3–4	Armenia	3–0	0–4
Liechtenstein	1–8	Northern Ireland	1–4	0–4
Kazakhstan	0–1	Moldova	0–0	0–1
Luxembourg	0–5	Macedonia	0–3	0–2
Andorra	0–2	Iceland	0–0	0–2
Azerbaijan	1–5	Republic of Ireland	1–2	0–3

== Qualifying groups ==
=== Group 1 ===
Team	Pld	W	D	L	GF	GA	GD	Pts
Bosnia and Herzegovina	2	1	1	0	4	3	+1	4
Armenia	2	1	0	1	3	3	0	3
Norway	2	0	1	1	1	2	−1	1

=== Group 2 ===
Team	Pld	W	D	L	GF	GA	GD	Pts
Spain	2	2	0	0	7	2	+5	6
Slovakia	2	0	1	1	2	4	−2	1
Albania	2	0	1	1	0	3	−3	1

=== Group 3 ===
Team	Pld	W	D	L	GF	GA	GD	Pts
Serbia	2	2	0	0	5	1	+4	6
Lithuania	2	1	0	1	1	2	−1	3
Georgia	2	0	0	2	1	4	−3	0

=== Group 4 ===
Team	Pld	W	D	L	GF	GA	GD	Pts
Belgium	2	2	0	0	3	1	+2	6
Republic of Ireland	2	1	0	1	2	1	+1	3
Greece	2	0	0	2	1	4	−3	0

=== Group 5 ===
Team	Pld	W	D	L	GF	GA	GD	Pts
Italy	2	2	0	0	2	0	+2	6
Austria	2	0	1	1	0	1	−1	1
Iceland	2	0	1	1	0	1	−1	1

=== Group 6 ===
Team	Pld	W	D	L	GF	GA	GD	Pts
Russia	2	2	0	0	8	2	+6	6
Hungary	2	1	0	1	6	3	+3	3
Finland	2	0	0	2	1	10	−9	0

=== Group 7 ===
Team	Pld	W	D	L	GF	GA	GD	Pts
Portugal	2	2	0	0	4	0	+4	6
Poland	2	1	0	1	3	3	0	3
Latvia	2	0	0	2	1	5	−4	0

=== Group 8 ===
Team	Pld	W	D	L	GF	GA	GD	Pts
England	2	1	1	0	5	4	+1	4
Switzerland	2	1	0	1	5	4	+1	3
Moldova	2	0	1	1	3	5	−2	1

=== Group 9 ===
Team	Pld	W	D	L	GF	GA	GD	Pts
Czech Republic	2	2	0	0	4	1	+3	6
Belarus	2	1	0	1	2	2	0	3
Cyprus	2	0	0	2	0	3	−3	0

=== Group 10 ===
Team	Pld	W	D	L	GF	GA	GD	Pts
Germany	2	2	0	0	8	3	+5	6
Romania	2	1	0	1	4	5	−1	3
Northern Ireland	2	0	0	2	2	6	−4	0

=== Group 11 ===
Team	Pld	W	D	L	GF	GA	GD	Pts
Sweden	2	2	0	0	5	1	+4	6
Denmark	2	1	0	1	3	2	+1	3
Macedonia	2	0	0	2	1	6	−5	0

=== Group 12 ===
Team	Pld	W	D	L	GF	GA	GD	Pts
Bulgaria	2	2	0	0	5	1	+4	6
Ukraine	2	1	0	1	2	4	−2	3
Croatia	2	0	0	2	2	4	−2	0

=== Group 13 ===
Team	Pld	W	D	L	GF	GA	GD	Pts
Israel	2	1	1	0	3	2	+1	4
Turkey	2	0	2	0	0	0	0	2
Wales	2	0	1	1	2	3	−1	1

=== Group 14 ===
Team	Pld	W	D	L	GF	GA	GD	Pts
France	2	2	0	0	5	1	+4	6
Slovenia	2	1	0	1	1	2	−1	3
Scotland	2	0	0	2	1	4	−3	0

== Play-offs ==
The 14 group winners were paired up. The winners over two legs qualified for the finals. The draw took place in Nyon, Switzerland on 8 September 2006.

Team 1	Agg.	Team 2	1st leg	2nd leg
Serbia	5–3	Sweden	0–3	5–0
Czech Republic	3–2	Bosnia and Herzegovina	2–1	1–1
Russia	4–4 (a)	Portugal	4–1	0–3
England	3–0	Germany	1–0	2–0
Italy	2–1	Spain	0–0	2–1
Belgium	5–2	Bulgaria	1–1	4–1
France	1–2	Israel	1–1	0–1
