= Narimanidze =

Narimanidze (Georgian: ნარიმანიძე) is a Georgian surname. Notable people with the surname include:

- Aleksandre Narimanidze (born 2005), Georgian footballer
- Khatuna Narimanidze (born 1974), Georgian archer
