= 1974 UEFA European Under-23 Championship =

1974 UEFA European Under 23 Championship
Tournament details
- Teams: 21 (from 1 confederation)

Final positions
- Champions: Hungary U-23 (1st title)
- Runners-up: East Germany U-23
- Semifinalists: Poland U-23; Soviet Union U-23

Tournament statistics
- Matches played: 50
- Goals scored: 136 (2.72 per match)

The 1974 UEFA European Under-23 Championship, which spanned two years (1972–74) had 21 entrants. Hungary U-23 won the competition.

The 21 national teams were divided into eight groups (five groups of 3 + three group of 2). The group winners played off against each other on a two-legged home-and-away basis until the winner was decided. There was no finals tournament or 3rd-place playoff.

== Qualifying stage ==
=== Draw ===
The allocation of teams into qualifying groups was based on that of 1974 FIFA World Cup qualification with several changes, reflecting the absence of some nations:

- Group 1 did not include Hungary (moved to Group 7) and Malta, but included Czechoslovakia (moved from Group 8)
- Group 2 did not include Switzerland and Luxembourg
- Group 3 did not include Belgium and Iceland
- Group 4 did not include Finland (moved to Group 8)
- Group 5 did not include England and Wales, but included Denmark (moved from Group 8) and West Germany (who did not participate in World Cup qualification)
- Group 6 did not include Northern Ireland and Cyprus
- Group 7 did not include Spain, but included Hungary (moved from Group 1)
- Group 8 (based on World Cup qualifying Group 9) did not include Republic of Ireland, but included Finland (moved from Group 4)

Qualifying Group 1		P	W	D	L	F	A	Pts
1	Czechoslovakia	4	3	0	1	9	3	6
2	Sweden	4	2	1	1	6	5	5
3	Austria	4	0	1	3	1	8	1

- Austria 1–1 Sweden
- Austria 0–1 Czechoslovakia
- Czechoslovakia 4-0 Austria
- Sweden 0–3 Czechoslovakia
- Sweden 2–0 Austria
- Czechoslovakia 1–3 Sweden

Czechoslovakia qualify as group winners

Qualifying Group 2		P	W	D	L	F	A	Pts
1	Italy	2	2	0	0	4	1	4
2	Turkey	2	0	0	2	1	4	0

- Turkey 1–3 Italy
- Italy 1–0 Turkey

Italy qualify as group winners

Qualifying Group 3		P	W	D	L	F	A	Pts
1	Netherlands	2	2	0	0	4	1	4
2	Norway	2	0	0	2	1	4	0

- Norway 1–3 Netherlands
- Netherlands 1–0 Norway

Netherlands qualify as group winners

Qualifying Group 4		P	W	D	L	F	A	Pts
1	East Germany	4	3	0	1	10	3	6
2	Romania	4	1	1	2	5	6	3
3	Albania	4	1	1	2	3	9	3

- Albania 1–1 Romania
- Albania 1–0 East Germany
- Romania 2–1 Albania
- Romania 1–2 East Germany
- East Germany 2–1 Romania
- East Germany 6–0 Albania

East Germany qualify as group winners

Qualifying Group 5		P	W	D	L	F	A	Pts
1	Poland	4	3	1	0	9	3	7
2	West Germany	4	2	1	1	7	3	5
3	Denmark	4	0	0	4	1	11	0

- Denmark 0–2 Poland
- Denmark 0–2 West Germany
- Poland 4–1 Denmark
- West Germany 2–3 Poland
- West Germany 3–0 Denmark
- Poland 0–0 West Germany

Poland qualify as group winners

Qualifying Group 6		P	W	D	L	F	A	Pts
1	Bulgaria	2	1	1	0	2	1	3
2	Portugal	2	0	1	1	1	2	1

- Portugal 0–0 Bulgaria
- Bulgaria 2–1 Portugal

Bulgaria qualify as group winners

Qualifying Group 7		P	W	D	L	F	A	Pts
1	Hungary	4	3	0	1	6	6	6
2	Yugoslavia	4	2	0	2	6	3	4
3	Greece	4	1	0	3	4	7	2

- Yugoslavia 4–0 Hungary
- Greece 2–0 Yugoslavia
- Hungary 2–0 Greece
- Hungary 1–0 Yugoslavia
- Greece 2–3 Hungary
- Yugoslavia 2–0 Greece

Hungary qualify as group winners

Qualifying Group 8		P	W	D	L	F	A	Pts
1	Soviet Union	4	3	1	0	8	1	7
2	Finland	4	1	1	2	3	8	3
3	France	4	1	0	3	5	7	2

- Finland 1–3 France
- Soviet Union 3–1 France
- Soviet Union 4–0 Finland
- France 0–1 Soviet Union
- Finland 0–0 Soviet Union
- France 1–2 Finland

Soviet Union qualify as group winners

== Knockout stages ==
Quarter-finals

- Netherlands 2-1 Hungary
- Hungary 3-1 Netherlands

Hungary win 4-3 on aggregate

- Bulgaria 1-2 Poland
- Poland 0-0 Bulgaria

Poland win 2-1 on aggregate

- Soviet Union 6-0 Czechoslovakia
- Czechoslovakia 2-1 Soviet Union

Soviet Union win 7-2 on aggregate

- Italy 0-1 East Germany
- East Germany 2-1 Italy

East Germany win 3-1 on aggregate

Semi-finals

- Soviet Union 2-0 Hungary
- Hungary 2-0 Soviet Union [aet, pen]

2-2: Hungary win 4-3 on penalties

- East Germany 0-0 Poland
- Poland 2-2 East Germany

2-2: East Germany win on away goals rule

Final

- East Germany 3-2 Hungary
- Hungary 4-0 East Germany

Hungary win 6-3 on aggregate

Hungary finish as Champions

== See also ==
- UEFA European Under-21 Championship
