= Czechoslovakia national under-21 football team =

Czechoslovakia U-21
- Nickname: —
- Association: Československý fotbalový svaz
- Head coach: —
- Captain: —
- Most caps: ?
- Top scorer: ?
First colours	Second colours

First international
- U-23: Bulgaria 2–1 Czechoslovakia (Pleven, Bulgaria; November 15, 1967); U-21: Czechoslovakia 0–0 Scotland (Plzeň, Czechoslovakia; October 12, 1976) Last international U-23: Czechoslovakia 1–1 Portugal (Teplice, Czechoslovakia; November 12, 1975); U-21: Czechoslovakia 1–0 Italy (České Budějovice, Czechoslovakia; March 23, 1994)

Biggest win
- U-23: Czechoslovakia 4–0 Austria (Brno, Czechoslovakia; March 28, 1973); U-21: Czechoslovakia 7–0 Iceland (Michalovce, Czechoslovakia; September 25, 1990)

Biggest defeat
- U-23: (Soviet Union) USSR 6–0 Czechoslovakia (Yerevan, Armenian SSR, USSR; April 10, 1974); U-21: Sweden 4–0 Czechoslovakia (Växjö, Sweden; March 28, 1990); Records for competitive matches only

UEFA U-21 Championship
- Appearances: 6 (first in 1978)
- Best result: Quarter-Final, six occasions

The Czechoslovakia national under-21 football team was the national football team for the under-21s of Czechoslovakia, before the country split into the Czech Republic and Slovakia (For information about the national teams of the two countries, see the articles Czech Republic national under-21 football team and Slovakia national under-21 football team.)

Following the realignment of UEFA's youth competitions in 1976, Czechoslovakia's under-21 team was formed. Despite the end of the country in January 1993, the team played until March 1994, fulfilling its fixtures in the UEFA European Under-21 Championship as a combined team. Since the under-21 competition rules state that players must be 21 or under at the start of a two-year competition, technically it is an U-23 competition. Czechoslovakia's record for the preceding U-23 competitions is also shown.

In its twelve U-23 and U-21 competitions, the team had a decent record, winning the first competition in 1972 and reaching the quarter-finals on seven occasions. The team failed to qualify for the final eight on four occasions.

== U-23 Challenge Cup ==
In November 1967, Czechoslovakia were randomly chosen to play holders Bulgaria in Pleven for the Challenge Cup, but lost the match 2–1, with Mikuláš Krnáč scoring the goal for Czechoslovakia.

== UEFA U-23 Championship Record ==
Czechoslovakia's next competitive match was in qualification for the newly-formed under-23 championship, which got underway on 7 October 1970. They successfully navigated the qualification stage, topping a group with Finland and Romania. In the final stages they successively beat Sweden, Greece to reach the final against the Soviet Union. Czechoslovakia became champions of the inaugural edition in 1972 after beating the USSR 3–1 in the deciding second leg of the final at Bazaly in Ostrava, with goals from Miroslav Gajdůšek, Dušan Herda and Milan Albrecht.

Champions Runners-up Third place Fourth place

UEFA European Under-23 Championship finals record									Qualifications record						
Year	Round	Position	GP	W	D*	L	GF	GA	GP	W	D	L	GF	GA	
(Europe) 1972	Champions	1st	6	3	1	2	11	7	4	2	2	0	8	4	1972
(Europe) 1974	Quarterfinals	8th	2	1	0	1	2	7	4	3	0	1	9	3	1974
(Europe) 1976	did not qualify								4	0	2	2	3	7	1976
Total	1 title	2/3	8	4	1	3	13	14	12	5	4	3	20	14	Total

== UEFA U-21 Championship Record ==
From 1978, Czechoslovakia competed in the UEFA European Under-21 Championship.

- 1978: Losing quarter-finalists
- 1980: Losing quarter-finalists
- 1982: Did not qualify. Finished 2nd of 3 in qualification group 3.
- 1984: Did not qualify. Finished 2nd of 4 in qualification group 5.
- 1986: Did not qualify. Finished 3rd of 4 in qualification group 2.
- 1988: Losing quarter-finalists
- 1990: Losing quarter-finalists
- 1992: Losing quarter-finalists
- 1994: Losing quarter-finalists
