= Germany national under-21 football team =

National U–21 association football team

Germany Under-21
- Association: Deutscher Fußball-Bund
- Head coach: Antonio Di Salvo
- Captain: Tom Bischof
- Most caps: Fabian Ernst (31)
- Top scorer: Pierre Littbarski (18)
| First colours | Second colours |

First international
- U-23: West Germany 3–3 Yugoslavia (Socialist Federal Republic of Yugoslavia) (Frankfurt, West Germany; 25 June 1955); U-21: Poland 1–0 West Germany (Toruń, Poland; 10 October 1979)

Biggest win
- U-23: West Germany 3–0 Turkey (Augsburg, West Germany; 24 April 1971); U-21: San Marino 0–11 Germany (Serravalle, San Marino; 17 November 2009)

Biggest defeat
- U-23: Soviet Union 3–1 West Germany (Yerevan, Soviet Union; 29 April 1972); U-21: Portugal 5–0 Germany (Olomouc, Czech Republic; 27 June 2015)

UEFA U-21 Championship
- Appearances: 14 (first in 1982)
- Best result: Winners (2009, 2017, 2021)

The Germany national under-21 football team represents the under-21s of Germany in the UEFA European Under-21 Championship and is controlled by the German Football Association (DFB), the governing body of football in Germany.

Before the reunification of Germany, East Germany and West Germany played as separate entities — the two teams played separately until summer 1990. Following the realignment of UEFA's youth competitions in 1976, international under-21 football in Europe began. A West German team, however, did not compete in the U-21 European Championship until the qualifying round (beginning in 1980) of the 1982 competition.

West Germany competed in the first two under-23 competitions, which finished in 1972 and 1974. The first under-21 competition finals were in 1978, and since the under-21 competition rules state that players must be 21 or under at the start of a two-year competition, technically it is an under-23 competition.

The current Germany team can be legitimately considered as the current incarnation of the West German team, since the West Germany flag, uniform, and football association all became those of the unified Germany. In effect, the West German team absorbed the East German team to become 'the Germany national under-21 football team'.

For these reasons, the record of West Germany for the U-23 and U-21 competitions is shown below.

== Competitive record ==
For the East Germany team record, look here.

- 1972–1990 as West Germany
- 1994–present as Germany

Champions Runners-up Third place Fourth place

=== UEFA U-23 Championship record ===
| UEFA European Under-23 Championship finals record | | | | | | | | | Qualifications record | | | | | | |
| Year | Round | Position | GP | W | D* | L | GF | GA | GP | W | D | L | GF | GA | |
|---|---|---|---|---|---|---|---|---|---|---|---|---|---|---|---|
| (Europe) 1972 | Quarterfinals | 8th | 2 | 0 | 1 | 1 | 1 | 3 | 6 | 5 | 1 | 0 | 11 | 1 | 1972 |
| (Europe) 1974 | did not qualify | | | | | | | | 4 | 2 | 1 | 1 | 7 | 3 | 1974 |
| (Europe) 1976 | did not enter | | | | | | | | did not enter | | | | | | 1976 |
| Total | Quarterfinals | 1/3 | 2 | 0 | 1 | 1 | 1 | 3 | 10 | 7 | 2 | 1 | 18 | 4 | Total |

=== UEFA U-21 Championship record ===
| UEFA European Under-21 Championship finals record | | | | | | | | | Qualifications record | | | | | | |
| Year | Round | Position | GP | W | D* | L | GF | GA | GP | W | D | L | GF | GA | |
|---|---|---|---|---|---|---|---|---|---|---|---|---|---|---|---|
| (Europe) 1978 | did not enter | | | | | | | | did not enter | | | | | | 1978 |
| (Europe) 1980 | did not enter | | | | | | | | did not enter | | | | | | 1980 |
| (Europe) 1982 | Runners-up | 2nd | 6 | 4 | 0 | 2 | 15 | 9 | 6 | 5 | 0 | 1 | 15 | 5 | 1982 |
| (Europe) 1984 | did not qualify | | | | | | | | 6 | 3 | 3 | 0 | 13 | 4 | 1984 |
| (Europe) 1986 | did not qualify | | | | | | | | 6 | 3 | 1 | 2 | 9 | 6 | 1986 |
| (Europe) 1988 | did not qualify | | | | | | | | 6 | 3 | 0 | 3 | 12 | 9 | 1988 |
| (Europe) 1990 | Quarterfinals | 6th | 2 | 0 | 1 | 1 | 2 | 3 | 6 | 4 | 2 | 0 | 10 | 2 | 1990 |
| (Europe) 1992 | Quarterfinals | 6th | 2 | 0 | 1 | 1 | 4 | 5 | 4 | 4 | 0 | 0 | 12 | 1 | 1992 |
| (France) 1994 | did not qualify | | | | | | | | 8 | 5 | 0 | 3 | 20 | 8 | 1994 |
| (Spain) 1996 | Quarterfinals | 7th | 2 | 0 | 1 | 1 | 1 | 4 | 8 | 6 | 1 | 1 | 22 | 5 | 1996 |
| (Romania) 1998 | Quarterfinals | 5th | 3 | 2 | 0 | 1 | 3 | 2 | 8 | 6 | 2 | 0 | 20 | 3 | 1998 |
| (Slovakia) 2000 | did not qualify | | | | | | | | 8 | 4 | 1 | 3 | 9 | 7 | 2000 |
| (Switzerland) 2002 | did not qualify | | | | | | | | 8 | 5 | 1 | 2 | 18 | 7 | 2002 |
| (Germany) 2004 | Group stage | 6th | 3 | 1 | 0 | 2 | 4 | 5 | 8 | 5 | 2 | 1 | 13 | 6 | 2004 |
| (Portugal) 2006 | Group stage | 7th | 3 | 1 | 0 | 2 | 1 | 4 | 12 | 9 | 3 | 0 | 27 | 5 | 2006 |
| (Netherlands) 2007 | did not qualify | | | | | | | | 4 | 2 | 0 | 2 | 8 | 6 | 2007 |
| (Sweden) 2009 | Champions | 1st | 5 | 3 | 2 | 0 | 8 | 1 | 10 | 6 | 3 | 1 | 26 | 4 | 2009 |
| (Denmark) 2011 | did not qualify | | | | | | | | 8 | 3 | 3 | 2 | 26 | 10 | 2011 |
| (Israel) 2013 | Group stage | 6th | 3 | 1 | 0 | 2 | 4 | 5 | 12 | 10 | 2 | 0 | 43 | 11 | 2013 |
| (Czech Republic) 2015 | Semifinals | 3rd | 4 | 1 | 2 | 1 | 5 | 7 | 10 | 8 | 2 | 0 | 30 | 5 | 2015 |
| (Poland) 2017 | Champions | 1st | 5 | 3 | 1 | 1 | 8 | 3 | 10 | 10 | 0 | 0 | 35 | 8 | 2017 |
| (Italy) 2019 | Runners-up | 2nd | 5 | 3 | 1 | 1 | 15 | 7 | 10 | 8 | 1 | 1 | 33 | 7 | 2019 |
| (Hungary) (Slovenia) 2021 | Champions | 1st | 6 | 3 | 3 | 0 | 9 | 4 | 8 | 6 | 0 | 2 | 22 | 10 | 2021 |
| (Romania) (Georgia (country)) 2023 | Group stage | 15th | 3 | 0 | 1 | 2 | 2 | 5 | 10 | 9 | 0 | 1 | 32 | 9 | 2023 |
| (Slovakia) 2025 | Runners-up | 2nd | 6 | 5 | 0 | 1 | 17 | 7 | 10 | 8 | 2 | 0 | 35 | 10 | 2025 |
| (Albania) (Serbia) 2027 | Qualified | | | | | | | | 10 | 9 | 0 | 1 | 32 | 5 | 2027 |
| Total | 3 titles | 16/16 | 68 | 36 | 13* | 19 | 130 | 76 | 186 | 132 | 29 | 25 | 500 | 148 | Total |

== Individual awards ==
- Golden Player: Rudi Völler (1982)
- Golden Boot: Luca Waldschmidt (2019), Lukas Nmecha (2021), Nick Woltemade (2025)
- Silver Boot: Kevin Volland (2015)
- Bronze Boot: Marco Richter (2019)

EURO Under-21 dream team

On 17 June 2015, UEFA revealed an all-time best XI from the previous Under-21 final tournaments.

Included players from Germany:

- Goal: Manuel Neuer
- Defence: Mats Hummels
- Midfield: Mesut Özil

== UEFA European Under-21 Football Championship ==
=== 2027 UEFA European Under-21 Championship qualification ===
| Pos | Team | Pld | W | D | L | GF | GA | GD | Pts | Qualification | Germany | Greece | | Georgia | Latvia | Malta |
|---|---|---|---|---|---|---|---|---|---|---|---|---|---|---|---|---|
| 1 | Germany | 10 | 9 | 0 | 1 | 32 | 5 | +27 | 27 (Note: Tied on head-to-head points (3). Head-to-head goal difference: Germany +1, Greece −1.) | Final tournament | — | 2–3 | 3–0 | 2–0 | 5–0 | 6–0 |
| 2 | Greece | 10 | 9 | 0 | 1 | 29 | 6 | +23 | 27 | Play-offs | 0–2 | — | 4–0 | 3–0 | 4–2 | 5–0 |
| 3 | Northern Ireland | 10 | 4 | 2 | 4 | 13 | 13 | 0 | 14 | | 1–2 | 0–1 | — | 1–1 | 1–0 | 2–0 |
| 4 | Georgia | 10 | 2 | 4 | 4 | 13 | 15 | −2 | 10 | | 0–2 | 0–3 | 1–1 | — | 1–1 | 4–1 |
| 5 | Latvia | 10 | 2 | 2 | 6 | 8 | 20 | −12 | 8 | | 0–4 | 0–1 | 1–3 | 1–1 | — | 2–0 |
| 6 | Malta | 10 | 0 | 0 | 10 | 2 | 38 | −36 | 0 | | 1–4 | 0–5 | 0–4 | 0–5 | 0–1 | — |

Source: UEFA
Legend: Blue = home team win; Yellow = draw; Red = away team win.
Rules for classification: Tiebreakers

== Results and fixtures ==
Win Draw Loss

| 27 March 2026 2027 UEFA EC Q | Germany | 3–0 | Northern Ireland | Braunschweig |
| 18:00 | Tresoldi 11' (pen.), 41'; Weiper 90' | Report | | Stadium: Eintracht-Stadion; Attendance: 10,391; Referee: Jakob Sundberg (Denmark) |

| 31 March 2026 2027 UEFA EC Q | Greece | 0–2 | Germany | Athens |
| 18:00 | | Report | El Mala 11'; Kade 73' | Stadium: Leoforos Alexandras Stadium; Attendance: 4,835; Referee: Marc Nagtegaal (Netherlands) |

| 26 September 2026 2027 UEFA EC Q | Latvia | 0–4 | Germany | Riga |
| 18:00 | | Report | Brunner 2', 42'; Tresoldi 52'; Ibrahimović 76' | Stadium: Daugava Stadium; Attendance: 850; Referee: Vasil Minev (Bulgaria) |

| 30 September 2026 2027 UEFA EC Q | Malta | 1–4 | Germany | Ta' Qali |
| 18:00 | Tuma 9' | Report | Tresoldi 12', 47', 69'; Rothe 32' | Stadium: Centenary Stadium; Attendance: 1,012; Referee: Ozan Ergün (Turkey) |

| 6 October 2026 2027 UEFA EC Q | Germany | 2–0 | Georgia | Bielefeld |
| 18:00 | Pejčinović 10', 69' | Report | | Stadium: Bielefelder Alm; Attendance: 20,049; Referee: Florian Lata (Albania) |

| 13 November 2026 Friendly | Germany | 1–2 | Belgium | Essen |
| 18:00 | Damar 25' | Report | Duranville 8'; Vermant 65' | Stadium: Stadion an der Hafenstraße; Attendance: 10,107; Referee: Gergő Bogár (Hungary) |

| 17 November 2026 Friendly | Croatia | 3–2 | Germany | Rijeka |
| 18:00 | Segečić 26'; Topić 67', 84' | Report | Moerstedt 53'; Pejčinović 60' | Stadium: Stadion Rujevica; Attendance: 500; Referee: Žan Jazbec (Slovenia) |

== Players ==
=== Current squad ===
Players born in or after 2004 are eligible for the 2027 UEFA European Under-21 Championship.

The following players were called up for the friendly matches matches against Belgium and Croatia on 13 September and 18 November 2026.

Note: Names in italics denote players that have been called up to the senior team.

Caps and goals correct as of 17 November 2026, after the match against Croatia.

| No. | Pos. | Player | Date of birth (age) | Caps | Goals | Club |
|---|---|---|---|---|---|---|
| 1 | GK | Hannes Hermann | 23 March 2005 (age 21) | 0 | 0 | (German Football Association) Jahn Regensburg |
| 12 | GK | Dennis Seimen | 1 December 2005 (age 20) | 6 | 0 | (German Football Association) VfB Stuttgart |
| 23 | GK | Tom Ritzy Hülsmann | 11 April 2004 (age 22) | 0 | 0 | (French Football Federation) Stade de Reims |
| 2 | DF | Elias Baum | 26 October 2005 (age 21) | 8 | 0 | (German Football Association) Eintracht Frankfurt |
| 3 | DF | Tom Rothe | 29 October 2004 (age 22) | 11 | 2 | (German Football Association) Union Berlin |
| 4 | DF | Nnamdi Collins | 10 January 2004 (age 22) | 15 | 0 | (German Football Association) Eintracht Frankfurt |
| 5 | DF | Joshua Quarshie (captain) | 26 July 2004 (age 22) | 11 | 0 | (Austrian Football Association) Sturm Graz |
| 13 | DF | Hennes Behrens | 19 January 2005 (age 21) | 2 | 0 | (German Football Association) FC Augsburg |
| 15 | DF | Linus Gechter | 27 February 2004 (age 22) | 7 | 0 | (German Football Association) Hertha BSC |
| 22 | DF | Leandro Morgalla | 13 September 2004 (age 22) | 12 | 0 | (Austrian Football Association) Red Bull Salzburg |
| 6 | MF | Cajetan Lenz | 16 June 2006 (age 20) | 2 | 0 | (German Football Association) TSG Hoffenheim |
| 7 | MF | Anton Kade | 17 January 2004 (age 22) | 6 | 1 | (German Football Association) FC Augsburg |
| 8 | MF | Noël Aséko Nkili | 22 November 2005 (age 20) | 9 | 0 | (German Football Association) Eintracht Frankfurt |
| 10 | MF | Mert Kömür | 17 July 2005 (age 21) | 11 | 0 | (German Football Association) FC Augsburg |
| 16 | MF | Kofi Amoako | 6 May 2005 (age 21) | 1 | 0 | (German Football Association) Hamburger SV |
| 17 | MF | Maurice Krattenmacher | 11 August 2005 (age 21) | 2 | 0 | (German Football Association) SV Elversberg |
| 18 | MF | Laurin Ulrich | 31 January 2005 (age 21) | 3 | 0 | (German Football Association) SC Paderborn |
| 20 | MF | Muhammed Damar | 9 April 2004 (age 22) | 8 | 4 | (German Football Association) VfL Wolfsburg |
| 21 | MF | Louey Ben Farhat | 19 July 2006 (age 20) | 2 | 0 | (German Football Association) Karlsruher SC |
| 9 | FW | Max Moerstedt | 15 January 2006 (age 20) | 2 | 1 | (German Football Association) TSG Hoffenheim |
| 11 | FW | Dženan Pejčinović | 15 February 2005 (age 21) | 12 | 5 | (German Football Association) VfB Stuttgart |
| 19 | FW | Paris Brunner | 15 February 2006 (age 20) | 5 | 2 | (French Football Federation) Monaco |

=== Recent call-ups ===
The following players have previously been called up to the Germany under-21 squad in the last 12 months and remain eligible for selection.

| Pos. | Player | Date of birth (age) | Caps | Goals | Club | Latest call-up |
|---|---|---|---|---|---|---|
| GK | Mio Backhaus | 16 April 2004 (age 22) | 7 | 0 | (Germany) Werder Bremen | v. Belgium, 13 November 2026 |
| GK | Max Weiß | 15 June 2004 (age 22) | 1 | 0 | (England) Burnley | v. Georgia, 6 October 2026 |
| GK | Frank Feller | 7 January 2004 (age 22) | 0 | 0 | (Germany) 1. FC Heidenheim | v. Georgia, 6 October 2026 |
| DF | Hendry Blank | 21 August 2004 (age 22) | 6 | 0 | (Germany) Greuther Fürth | v. Belgium, 13 November 2026 |
| DF | Karim Coulibaly | 23 May 2007 (age 19) | 3 | 0 | (France) Strasbourg | v. Belgium, 13 November 2026 |
| DF | Lukas Ullrich | 16 March 2004 (age 22) | 13 | 0 | (Germany) Borussia Mönchengladbach | v. Belgium, 13 November 2026 |
| DF | Tim Drexler | 6 March 2005 (age 21) | 1 | 0 | (Austria) Red Bull Salzburg | v. Georgia, 6 October 2026 |
| DF | Noahkai Banks | 1 December 2006 (age 19) | 1 | 0 | (Germany) FC Augsburg | v. Georgia, 6 October 2026 |
| DF | Finn Jeltsch | 17 July 2006 (age 20) | 6 | 0 | (Germany) VfB Stuttgart | v. Greece, 31 March 2026 |
| DF | Max Finkgräfe | 27 March 2004 (age 22) | 0 | 0 | (Germany) RB Leipzig | v. Northern Ireland, 27 March 2026 |
| MF | Mika Baur | 9 July 2004 (age 22) | 1 | 0 | (Scotland) Celtic | v. Belgium, 13 November 2026 |
| MF | Arijon Ibrahimović | 11 December 2005 (age 20) | 5 | 1 | (Germany) FC Augsburg | v. Belgium, 13 November 2026 |
| MF | Aljoscha Kemlein | 2 August 2004 (age 22) | 11 | 0 | (Germany) Union Berlin | v. Georgia, 6 October 2026 |
| MF | Noah Darvich | 25 September 2006 (age 20) | 3 | 0 | (Germany) SV Elversberg | v. Georgia, 6 October 2026 |
| MF | Francis Onyeka | 29 April 2007 (age 19) | 2 | 0 | (Germany) SV Elversberg | v. Georgia, 6 October 2026 |
| MF | Wael Mohya | 31 December 2008 (age 17) | 2 | 0 | (Germany) Borussia Mönchengladbach | v. Georgia, 6 October 2026 |
| MF | Tom Bischof | 28 June 2005 (age 21) | 7 | 3 | (Germany) Bayern Munich | v. Latvia, 26 September 2026 |
| MF | Said El Mala | 26 August 2006 (age 20) | 7 | 1 | (Germany) 1. FC Köln | v. Greece, 31 March 2026 |
| MF | Brajan Gruda | 31 May 2004 (age 22) | 20 | 3 | (Germany) RB Leipzig | v. Greece, 31 March 2026 |
| FW | Nicolò Tresoldi (captain) | 20 August 2004 (age 22) | 27 | 16 | (Belgium) Club Brugge | v. Belgium, 13 November 2026 |
| FW | Nelson Weiper | 17 March 2005 (age 21) | 19 | 6 | (Austria) Sturm Graz | v. Greece, 31 March 2026 |

=== Past squads ===
- 1996 UEFA European Under-21 Championship
- 1998 UEFA European Under-21 Championship
- 2004 UEFA European Under-21 Championship
- 2006 UEFA European Under-21 Championship
- 2009 UEFA European Under-21 Championship
- 2013 UEFA European Under-21 Championship
- 2015 UEFA European Under-21 Championship
- 2017 UEFA European Under-21 Championship
- 2019 UEFA European Under-21 Championship
- 2021 UEFA European Under-21 Championship
- 2023 UEFA European Under-21 Championship

=== Player records ===
Most caps

| No. of caps | Player | U-21 career |
|---|---|---|
| 31 | Fabian Ernst | 1998–2001 |
| 30 | Levin Öztunalı | 2015–2019 |
| 30 | Ansgar Knauff | 2021–2025 |
| 30 | Eric Martel | 2021–2025 |
| 27 | Andreas Beck | 2007–2009 |
| 27 | Nicolò Tresoldi | 2023–present |
| 26 | Mike Hanke | 2003–2005 |
| 25 | Dennis Aogo | 2007–2009 |
| 24 | Christian Tiffert | 2002–2004 |
| 24 | Daniel Schwaab | 2007–2010 |
| 24 | Lewis Holtby | 2009–2013 |
| 24 | Moritz Leitner | 2011–2015 |
| 24 | Nadiem Amiri | 2016–2019 |

Most goals

| No. of goals | No. of caps | Player | U-21 career |
|---|---|---|---|
| 18 | 21 | Pierre Littbarski | 1979–1982 |
| 16 | 27 | Nicolò Tresoldi | 2023–present |
| 17 | 20 | Heiko Herrlich | 1990–1993 |
| 15 | 23 | Benjamin Auer | 2002–2004 |
| 14 | 26 | Mike Hanke | 2003–2005 |
| 14 | 24 | Lewis Holtby | 2009–2013 |
| 13 | 21 | Rouwen Hennings | 2007–2009 |
| 13 | 15 | Youssoufa Moukoko | 2021– |
| 13 | 18 | Nick Woltemade | 2023–2025 |
| 11 | 22 | Kevin Volland | 2012–2015 |

=== Former coaches ===
- Hannes Löhr (1990–2002)
- Jürgen Kohler (2002–2003)
- Uli Stielike (2003–2004)
- Dieter Eilts (2004–2008)
- Horst Hrubesch (2008–2009)
- Rainer Adrion (2009–2013)
- Horst Hrubesch (2013–2016)
- Stefan Kuntz (2016–2021)
- Antonio Di Salvo (2021–)

== See also ==
- Germany national football team
- Germany national youth football team
- UEFA European Under-21 Championship
