= Greece national under-21 football team =

National association football team

Greece Under-21
- Nickname(s): Εθνική Ελπίδων ("National team of Hopes")
- Association: Hellenic Football Federation (HFF)
- Confederation: UEFA (Europe)
- Head coach: Giannis Taousianis
- Captain: Alexis Kalogeropoulos
- Most caps: Giorgos Karagounis (39)
- Top scorer: Nikos Liberopoulos & Lampros Choutos (15)
- FIFA code: GRE
First colours	Second colours

Biggest win
- Greece 6–0 Luxembourg (Greece; 1993); Greece 6–0 Latvia (Greece; 1999)

Biggest defeat
- Hungary 7–0 Greece (Hungary; 1976)

UEFA U-21 Championship
- Appearances: 5 (first in 1988)
- Best result: Runners-up, 1988, 1998

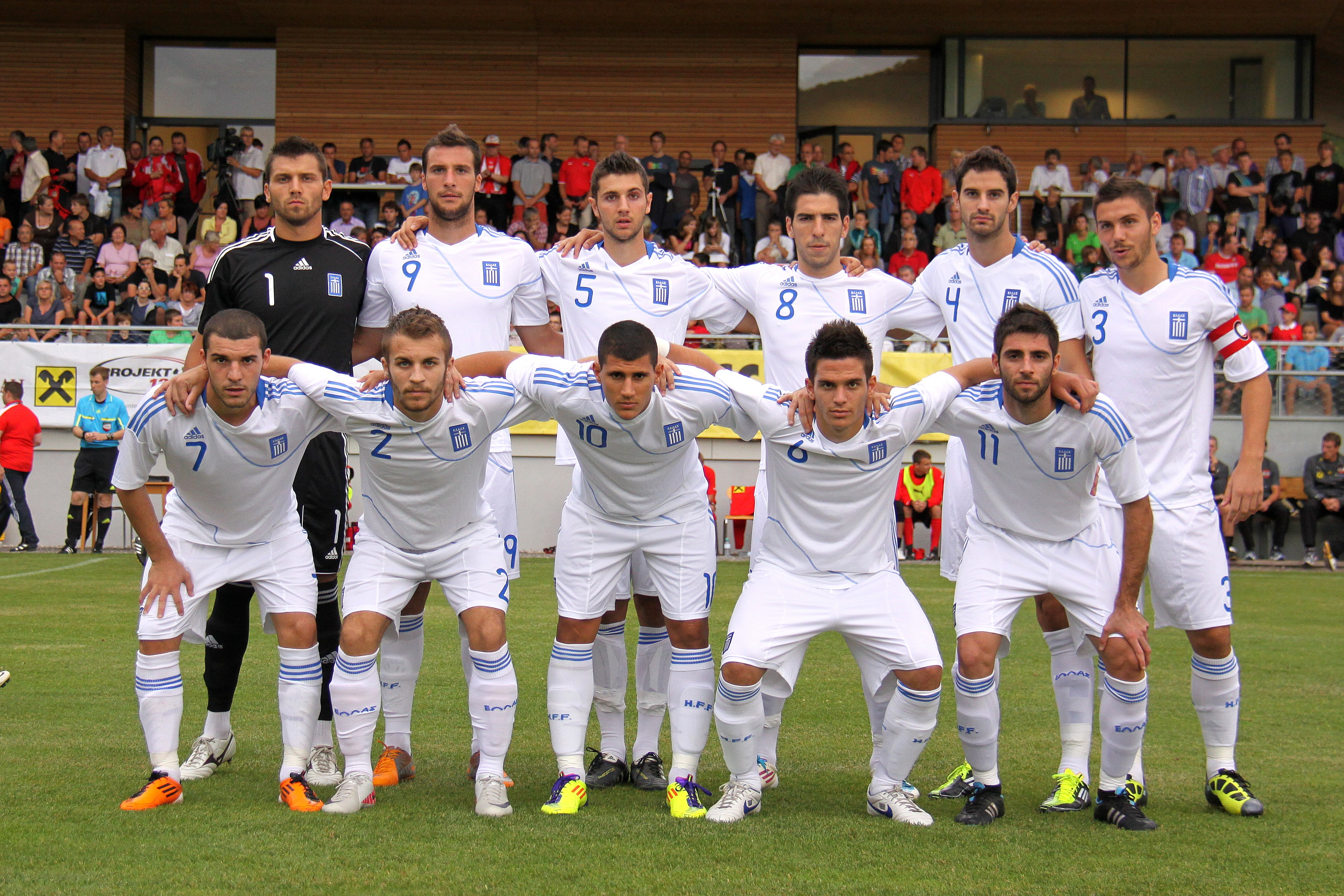
Greece U-21 team on 5 September 2011

The Greece national under-21 football team is the national under-21 football team of Greece and is controlled by the Hellenic Football Federation, the governing body for football in Greece. The team competes in the European Under-21 Football Championship, held every two years and it is considered to be the feeder team for the Greece national football team.

The under-21 competition rules stipulate that players must be 21 or under at the start of a two-year competition, so technically it is up to an U-23 competition. To be eligible for the Greece National Team, all the football players must hold Hellenic (Greek) nationality and comply with the provisions of Article 15 of the regulations governing the Application of FIFA Statutes. A list of 35 football players must be submitted to the UEFA administration 30 days before the European Under-21 Football Championship opening match. Only 22 of the 35 players listed are authorised to take part in the final tournament and three of them must be goalkeepers.

As long as they are eligible, players can play at any level, making it possible to play for the U-21s, senior side and again for the U-21s, as Sotiris Ninis has done recently. It is also possible to play more than one country at youth level or different at youth level and different at senior level (provided the player is eligible). But a football player can represent only the senior national team that capped him first.

Also in existence are national teams for Under-20s (for non-UEFA tournaments), Under-19s and Under-17s.

== History ==
The first time that Greece's national team of hopes were formed was in 1968, with the aim of participating in the first Balkan Youth Championship that took place at the Kaftanzoglio Stadium in Thessaloniki.

In their maiden match she played with the corresponding team in Turkey; the match ended in a goalless draw.

The first eleven were the following: Tourkomenis, B. Intzoglou (59' Dimitriou), Chaliambalias, Kyriazis, Athanasopoulos, Karafeskos, Filakouris, Sarafis (46' Stoligas), K. Papaioannou, Koudas, Kritikopoulos (70' Alexiadis).

In the following years, Greece won twice the Balkan Youth Championship (1969 and 1971), and they fought twice (1988 and 1998) in the final of the UEFA European Under-21 Championship.

== Competition Record ==
As of 16 November 2026

Competition	Pld	W	D	L
UEFA U-23 Championship	14	6	0	8
UEFA U-21 Championship	224	111	35	78

=== UEFA European U23 Championship record ===
UEFA European U21 Championship record										Qualification record						
Year	Round	Position	Pld	W	D	L	GF	GA	GD	Pld	W	D	L	GF	GA	GD
1972	Semi-finals	3rd/4th	4	2	0	2	7	5	+2	2	2	0	0	3	0	+3
1974	Did not qualify									4	1	0	3	4	7	−3
1976	Did not qualify									4	1	0	3	4	9	−5
Total	0 titles	1/3	4	2	0	2	7	5	+2	10	4	0	6	11	16	−5

=== UEFA European U21 Championship record ===
UEFA European U21 Championship record										Qualification record						
Year	Round	Position	Pld	W	D	L	GF	GA	GD	Pld	W	D	L	GF	GA	GD
1978	Did not qualify									4	0	1	3	1	13	−12
1980	Did not qualify									4	2	0	2	5	6	−1
1982	Did not qualify									4	0	1	3	2	7	−5
1984	Did not qualify									6	3	2	1	6	4	+2
1986	Did not qualify									4	2	0	2	6	8	−2
1988	Final	Runners-up	6	1	3	2	8	8	0	6	4	1	1	15	5	+10
1990	Did not qualify									6	1	1	4	3	11	−8
1992	Did not qualify									6	1	1	4	6	13	−7
(France) 1994	Quarter-finals	6th	2	0	1	1	2	4	−2	8	6	2	0	23	6	+17
(Spain) 1996	Did not qualify									8	3	0	5	12	12	0
(Romania) 1998	Final	Runners-up	3	2	0	1	4	1	+3	10	6	1	3	16	11	+5
(Slovakia) 2000	Did not qualify									12	8	2	2	33	13	+20
(Switzerland) 2002	Group stage	8th	3	0	1	2	3	6	−3	10	6	1	3	18	8	+10
(Germany) 2004	Did not qualify									8	3	3	2	10	7	+3
(Portugal) 2006	Did not qualify									12	6	2	4	18	9	+9
(Netherlands) 2007	Did not qualify									2	0	0	2	1	4	−3
(Sweden) 2009	Did not qualify									10	5	3	2	20	13	+7
(Denmark) 2011	Did not qualify									10	6	1	3	13	12	+1
(Israel) 2013	Did not qualify									10	4	1	5	14	15	−1
(Czech Republic) 2015	Did not qualify									8	5	0	3	20	10	+10
(Poland) 2017	Did not qualify									10	4	1	5	13	14	−1
(Italy) (San Marino) 2019	Did not qualify									12	8	1	3	26	7	+19
(Hungary) (Slovenia) 2021	Did not qualify									10	5	1	4	10	11	−1
(Romania) (Georgia (country)) 2023	Did not qualify									10	5	2	3	16	10	+6
(Slovakia) 2025	Did not qualify									10	7	1	2	20	14	+6
(Albania) (Serbia) 2027	Qualified									12	9	2	1	31	8	+23
Total	0 titles	5/26	14	3	5	6	17	19	−2	210	108	30	72	352	246	+106

== Honours ==
Greece national under-21 football team honours
Type	Competition	Titles	Winners	Runners-up	Third place	Ref.
International	UEFA European Under-23 Championship	0			1972	
International	UEFA European Under-21 Championship	0		1988, 1998		
Regional	Balkan Youth Championship	2	1969, 1971			
Regional	Valeriy Lobanovskyi Memorial Tournament	0			2015, 2018	

- record
- ^{S} Shared record

== Results and schedule ==
The following is a list of match results from the previous 12 months, as well as any future matches that have been scheduled.

=== 2026 ===
27 March 2026 2027 UEFA European U21 Championship Qualification – Group F	Greece	5–0	Malta	Livadeia, Greece
18:00	Goumas 16'; Koutsias 23', 61' (pen.), 79'; Kaloskamis 49'	Report		Stadium: Levadia Municipal Stadium; Referee: Cláudio Pereira (Portugal)

31 March 2026 2027 UEFA European U21 Championship Qualification – Group F	Greece	0–2	Germany	Athens, Greece
19:00		Report	El Mala 11'; Kade 73'	Stadium: Leoforos Alexandras Stadium; Referee: Marc Nagtegaal (Netherlands)

27 May 2026 Friendly	Greece	1–2	Qatar	Nedelišće, Croatia
18:30	Pnevmonidis 77'	Report	Taha 7'; Al-Ghareeb 71' (pen.)	Stadium: NK Nedelišće

30 May 2026 Friendly	Croatia	1–1	Greece	Nedelišće, Croatia
16:00	Kardum 39'	Report	Pnevmonidis 36'	Stadium: NK Nedelišće

26 September 2026 2027 UEFA European U21 Championship Qualification – Group F	Georgia	0–3	Greece	Tbilisi, Georgia
18:00		Report	Allen 6'; Bakoulas 13'; Pnevmonidis 65'	Stadium: Mikheil Meskhi Stadium; Referee: Yura Mahtesyan (Armenia)

1 October 2026 2027 UEFA European U21 Championship Qualification – Group F	Greece	4–2	Latvia	Livadeia, Greece
18:00	Almyras 5', 37'; K. Kostoulas 17', 53'	Report	Patrikejevs 28'; Lizunovs 90+2'	Stadium: Levadia Municipal Stadium; Referee: Tural Kurbanov (Azerbaijan)

6 October 2026 2027 UEFA European U21 Championship Qualification – Group F	Northern Ireland	0–1	Greece	Lurgan, Northern Ireland
19:00		Report	Mythou 32'	Stadium: Mourneview Park; Referee: Mohammad Usman Aslam (Norway)

12 November 2026 2027 UEFA European U21 Championship Qualification – Play–offs	Iceland	1–1	Greece	Reykjavík, Iceland
15:00	Mikaelsson 89'	Report	Mikaelsson 90+2' (o.g.)	Stadium: Thróttarvöllur; Referee: Nathan Verboomen (Belgium)

16 November 2026 2027 UEFA European U21 Championship Qualification – Play–offs	Greece	1–1 (5–4 p)	Iceland	Athens, Greece
19:00	Kostoulas 90+1'	Report	Guðjohnsen 72'	Stadium: Apostolos Nikolaidis Stadium; Referee: Daniele Chiffi (Italy)
	Penalties
	Mythou (penalty scored); Koutsias (penalty scored); Kostoulas (penalty scored); Kaloskamis (penalty scored); Mouzakitis (penalty scored)		Daðason (penalty missed); Mikaelsson (penalty scored); Karlsson (penalty scored); Guðmundsson (penalty scored); Haralsson (penalty scored)

== Euro 2027 Under-21 Championship qualification ==
=== 2027 UEFA European Under-21 Championship qualification ===
Pos	Team	Pld	W	D	L	GF	GA	GD	Pts	Qualification	Germany	Greece		Georgia	Latvia	Malta
1	Germany	10	9	0	1	32	5	+27	27 (Note: Tied on head-to-head points (3). Head-to-head goal difference: Germany +1, Greece −1.)	Final tournament	—	2–3	3–0	2–0	5–0	6–0
2	Greece	10	9	0	1	29	6	+23	27	Play-offs	0–2	—	4–0	3–0	4–2	5–0
3	Northern Ireland	10	4	2	4	13	13	0	14		1–2	0–1	—	1–1	1–0	2–0
4	Georgia	10	2	4	4	13	15	−2	10		0–2	0–3	1–1	—	1–1	4–1
5	Latvia	10	2	2	6	8	20	−12	8		0–4	0–1	1–3	1–1	—	2–0
6	Malta	10	0	0	10	2	38	−36	0		1–4	0–5	0–4	0–5	0–1	—

Source: UEFA
Rules for classification: Tiebreakers

==== Play-offs ====
12 November 2026
14:00 (13:00 UTC+0)

Iceland	1–1	Greece
Mikaelsson 88'	Report	Mikaelsson 90+2' (o.g.)

Thróttarvöllur, Reykjavik
Attendance: 220
Referee: Nathan Verboomen (Belgium)
16 November 2026
18:00 (19:00 UTC+2)

Greece	1–1 (a.e.t.)	Iceland
K. Kostoulas 90+1'	Report	Guðjohnsen 72'
Penalties
Mythou (penalty scored); Koutsias (penalty scored); K. Kostoulas (penalty scored); Kaloskamis (penalty scored); Mouzakitis (penalty scored)	5–4	(penalty missed) Daðason; (penalty scored) Mikaelsson; (penalty scored) Karlsson; (penalty scored) G. Guðmundsson; (penalty scored) Haraldsson

Apostolos Nikolaidis Stadium, Athens

Greece qualified to 2027 European Under-21 Championship

== Coaching staff ==
=== Managers ===
The following table provides a summarized and complete record of each Greece team manager including their results regarding European Under-21 Championship.

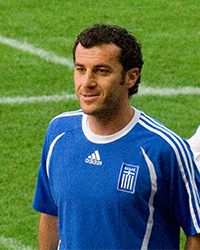
Giannis Goumas was one of the most recent U-21 Greece national team manager

Key: Pld–games played, W–games won, D–games drawn; L–games lost, %–win percentage

Manager	Greece tenure	Pld	W	D	L	Win %	Major competitions
(Greece) Stelios Aposporis	2004–2007	18	9	1	8	50.0	2006 European Championship – Failed to qualify 2007 European Championship – Failed to qualify
(Greece) Nikos Nioplias	2007–2009	19	9	5	5	47.4	2009 European Championship – Failed to qualify
(Greece) Georgios Georgiadis	2010–2012	19	10	2	7	52.6	2011 European Championship – Play-offs; 2013 European Championship – Failed to qualify
(Greece) Kostas Tsanas	2012–2015	18	9	2	7	50.0	2015 European Championship – Failed to qualify
(Greece) Michalis Iordanidis	2015	1	1	0	0	100.0	—
(Greece) Antonis Nikopolidis	2015–2019	33	16	5	12	48.5	2017 European Championship – Failed to qualify 2019 European Championship – Play-offs
(Greece) Giannis Goumas	2019–2021	12	4	2	6	33.3	2021 European Championship – Failed to qualify
(Greece) Georgios Simos	2021–2022	10	5	2	3	50.0	2023 European Championship – Failed to qualify
(Greece) Nikos Papadopoulos	2022–2024	10	5	2	3	50.0	2025 European Championship – Failed to qualify
(Greece) Giannis Taousianis	2024–	21	11	6	4	52.4	2027 European Championship – Qualified
Totals							

Last updated: 16 November 2026. Statistics include official FIFA-recognised matches only.

== Players ==
=== Current squad ===
As of 17 November 2026

The following 26 players were called up for the 2027 UEFA European Under-21 Championship qualification matches against Iceland, to be played on 12 and 16 November 2026.

Names in italics denote players who have been capped for the senior team.

No.	Pos.	Player	Date of birth (age)	Caps	Goals	Club
12	GK	Nikolaos Botis	31 March 2004 (age 22)	12	0	(Polish Football Association) Pogoń Szczecin
	GK	Theofilos Kakadiaris	17 January 2007 (age 19)	0	0	(Hellenic Football Federation) Asteras Tripolis
	GK	Alexandros Tsompanidis	5 August 2004 (age 22)	3	0	(Hellenic Football Federation) Olympiacos B
4	DF	Alexis Kalogeropoulos (captain)	26 July 2004 (age 22)	18	1	(German Football Association) 1. FC Nürnberg
5	DF	Christos Alexiou	30 June 2005 (age 21)	15	1	(Hellenic Football Federation) AEK Athens
19	DF	Konstantinos Kostoulas	8 February 2005 (age 21)	12	4	(Hellenic Football Federation) OFI
22	DF	Dimitrios Keramitsis	1 July 2004 (age 22)	4	1	(Polish Football Association) Pogoń Szczecin
23	DF	Giorgos Katris	14 October 2005 (age 21)	9	0	(Hellenic Football Federation) Panathinaikos
	DF	Konstantinos Polykratis	2 July 2006 (age 20)	1	0	(Hellenic Football Federation) Kifisia
	DF	Taxiarchis Filon	16 March 2005 (age 21)	4	0	(Hellenic Football Federation) Levadiakos
6	MF	Christos Mouzakitis	25 December 2006 (age 19)	5	0	(The Football Association) Hull City
8	MF	Sotiris Kontouris	24 February 2005 (age 21)	9	0	(Hellenic Football Federation) Panathinaikos
10	MF	Dimitris Kaloskamis	1 March 2005 (age 21)	16	1	(Hellenic Football Federation) AEK Athens
16	MF	Christos Almyras	18 July 2005 (age 21)	9	2	(Swedish Football Association) Djurgårdens IF
18	MF	Adriano Bregou	9 April 2006 (age 20)	13	0	(Hellenic Football Federation) Panetolikos
	MF	Theofanis Bakoulas	4 January 2005 (age 21)	11	2	(Hellenic Football Federation) Olympiacos
	MF	Konstantinos Goumas	12 March 2005 (age 21)	12	2	(Hellenic Football Federation) Levadiakos
7	FW	Stavros Pnevmonidis	7 August 2006 (age 20)	10	4	(Hellenic Football Federation) Atromitos
9	FW	Georgios Koutsias	8 February 2004 (age 22)	27	10	(Portuguese Football Federation) Famalicão
11	FW	Anestis Mythou	22 May 2007 (age 19)	5	1	(Hellenic Football Federation) PAOK
14	FW	Georgios Kyriopoulos	24 August 2004 (age 22)	4	1	(Hellenic Football Federation) Kifisia
20	FW	Antonis Papakanellos	11 August 2005 (age 21)	15	1	(Hellenic Football Federation) Asteras Tripolis
21	FW	Lampros Smyrlis	12 July 2004 (age 22)	10	1	(Hellenic Football Federation) Panetolikos
	FW	Dimitris Rallis	26 March 2005 (age 21)	9	3	(Polish Football Association) Jagiellonia Białystok
	FW	Giannis Theodosoulakis	11 September 2004 (age 22)	7	0	(Hellenic Football Federation) OFI

=== Recent call-ups ===
Following are listed players called up in the previous twelve months who are still eligible to represent the under-21 team.

Pos.	Player	Date of birth (age)	Caps	Goals	Club	Latest call-up
GK	Dimitrios Monastirlis	22 March 2004 (age 22)	5	0	(Greece) PAOK	v.Iceland, 12 November 2026^{INJ}
GK	Vasilios Kaltsas	25 May 2007 (age 19)	0	0	(Slovakia) ŠTK Šamorín	v.Northern Ireland, 6 October 2026
GK	Georgios Karakasidis	31 January 2005 (age 21)	3	0	(Greece) Iraklis	v.Croatia, 30 May 2026
DF	Noah Allen	28 April 2004 (age 22)	12	1	(United States) Chicago Fire	v.Iceland, 12 November 2026^{INJ}
DF	Athanasios Koutsogoulas	3 April 2004 (age 22)	14	0	(Greece) Olympiacos B	v.Northern Ireland, 6 October 2026
DF	Nikolaos Vakouftsis	31 March 2004 (age 22)	1	0	(Austria) ASK Voitsberg	v.Croatia, 30 May 2026
MF	Giannis Apostolakis	24 September 2004 (age 22)	12	0	(Greece) OFI	v.Northern Ireland, 6 October 2026
MF	Erik Hamza	24 August 2007 (age 19)	0	0	(Greece) Kalamata	v.Northern Ireland, 6 October 2026
MF	Vangelis Nikolaou	3 June 2004 (age 22)	8	0	(Greece) Panetolikos	v.Croatia, 30 May 2026
MF	Giannis Sarris	20 March 2007 (age 19)	1	0	(Greece) PAOK B	v.Croatia, 30 May 2026
FW	Dimitris Chatsidis	14 June 2006 (age 20)	3	0	(Greece) PAOK	v.Northern Ireland, 6 October 2026
FW	Panagiotis Tsantilas	1 March 2004 (age 22)	3	0	(Greece) Atromitos	v.Croatia, 30 May 2026
FW	Charalampos Kostoulas	30 May 2007 (age 19)	6	2	(England) Brighton & Hove Albion	v.Germany, 31 March 2026
^{INJ} Withdrew due to injury^{PRE} Included in preliminary roster

== Player records ==
Players in bold are still active with under-21 Greece.

=== Top appearances ===
Rank	Player	Club(s)	Year(s)	U-21 caps
1	Giorgos Karagounis	Panathinaikos, Apollon Smyrnis	1993–1998	39
2	Georgios Alexopoulos	Panathinaikos	1996–1998	33
3	Dimitrios Papadopoulos	Akratitos, Burnley	2000–2002	27
3	Anastasios Lagos	Panathinaikos	2011–2014	27
3	**Georgios Koutsias**	PAOK, PAOK B, Volos, Chicago Fire, Lugano, Famalicão	2020–	27
6	Vasilios Lakis	Paniliakos	1996–1998	25
6	Ioannis Amanatidis	Stuttgart, Greuther Fürth	2000–2003	25
8	Dimitrios Mavrogenidis	Aris Thessaloniki, Olympiacos	1996–1998	24
8	Apostolos Vellios	Everton, Blackpool, Lierse	2011–2014	24
8	Elini Dimoutsos	Panathinaikos, OFI, Panetolikos	2008–2010	24

=== Top goalscorers ===
Rank	Player	Club(s)	Year(s)	U-21 goals
1	Nikos Liberopoulos	Kalamata, Panathinaikos	1994–1998	15
1	Lampros Choutos	Olympiacos	1999–2002	15
3	Giorgos Karagounis	Panathinaikos, Apollon Smyrnis	1993–1998	11
3	Dimitrios Papadopoulos	Akratitos, Burnley	2000–2002	11
5	**Georgios Koutsias**	PAOK, PAOK B, Volos, Chicago Fire, Lugano, Famalicão	2020–	10
6	Nikos Karelis	Ergotelis, Amkar Perm, Panathinaikos	2010–2014	9
7	Efthymis Koulouris	Anorthosis, PAOK, Atromitos	2016–2018	7
7	Antonis Petropoulos	Haidari, Egaleo, Panathinaikos, OFI	2005–2008	7
7	Vangelis Mantzios	Panionios	2003–2005	7
7	Lazaros Christodoulopoulos	PAOK, Panathinaikos	2005–2008	7
7	Nikolaos Ioannidis	Borussia Dortmund II	2015–2016	7

== Former squads ==
- 2002 UEFA European Under-21 Championship squads – Greece
- 1998 UEFA European Under-21 Championship squads – Greece
- 1994 UEFA European Under-21 Championship squads – Greece

== See also ==
- Greece national football team
- Greece national under-23 football team
- Greece national under-20 football team
- Greece national under-19 football team
- Greece national under-17 football team
