= Konstantinos Kostoulas =

Greek footballer (born 2005)

Personal information
- Date of birth: 8 February 2005 (age 21)
- Place of birth: Athens, Greece
- Height: 1.87 m (6 ft 2 in)
- Position: Centre-back

Team information
- Current team: OFI
- Number: 5

Youth career
- –2019: Agia Anna Volos
- 2019–2024: Olympiacos

Senior career*
Years	Team	Apps	(Gls)
2024–2025	Olympiacos B	3	(0)
2024–2025	→ Rio Ave (loan)	3	(0)
2025–	OFI	24	(1)

International career^{‡}
2024	Greece U19	1	(0)
2025–	Greece U21	8	(1)
- * Club domestic league appearances and goals as of 20 September 2026 ‡ National team caps and goals as of 30 May 2026

Konstantinos Kostoulas (Greek: Κωνσταντίνος Κωστούλας; born 8 February 2005) is a Greek professional footballer who plays as a centre-back for Super League club OFI.

== Club career ==
Kostoulas started his career with Agia Anna Volos, before joining Olympiacos in 2019. He progressed through the academy to make his debut for Olympiacos B in Super League Greece 2 in March 2024. In July 2024, he joined Primeira Liga side Rio Ave on loan for the season. On 18 April 2025, he made his professional league debut for Rio Ave, playing the full match in a 1–1 draw with Santa Clara. In July 2025, Kostoulas joined Super League Greece side OFI on a three-year deal.

== International career ==
Kostoulas has represented Grece at under-19 and under-21 level.

== Personal life ==
Kostoulas is the son of former Greek international footballer Athanasios Kostoulas, while his brother, Charalampos, plays for Brighton & Hove Albion.

== Career statistics ==
As of 26 April 2026

Club	Season	League			Cup		Continental		Other		Total	
Club	Season	Division	Apps	Goals	Apps	Goals	Apps	Goals	Apps	Goals	Apps	Goals
Olympiacos B	2023–24	Superleague Greece 2	3	0	—		—		—		3	0
Rio Ave (loan)	2024–25	Primeira Liga	3	0	1	0	—		—		4	0
OFI (loan)	2025–26	Superleague Greece	16	1	9	0	—		1	0	26	1
Career total			22	1	10	0	0	0	1	0	33	1

== Honours ==
OFI

- Greek Cup: 2025–26
- Greek Super Cup: 2026
