= Aleko Basiladze =

Georgian footballer (born 2005)

Personal information
- Date of birth: 30 December 2005 (age 20)
- Place of birth: Kutaisi, Georgia
- Position: Midfielder

Team information
- Current team: Slovan Liberec

Youth career
- –2022: Torpedo Kutaisi

Senior career*
Years	Team	Apps	(Gls)
2023–2026	Torpedo Kutaisi	44	(7)
2026–	Slovan Liberec	0	(0)

International career^{‡}
2021–2022	Georgia U17	7	(0)
2023	Georgia U18	2	(1)
2022–2024	Georgia U19	8	(2)
2024–	Georgia U21	6	(1)
- * Club domestic league appearances and goals as of 9 December 2025 ‡ National team caps and goals as of 9 December 2025

Aleko Basiladze (Georgian: ალეკო ბასილაძე; born 30 December 2005) is a Georgian professional footballer who plays as a midfielder for Czech First League club Slovan Liberec.

He has won the Supercup and represented his country in the national youth teams.

== Club career ==
Basiladze is a product of the academy of Torpedo Kutaisi. He played in youth teams before making his debut for the senior team as a second-half substitute in a 1–0 loss to Telavi on 20 May 2023. Basiladze opened his goal-scoring account on 11 April 2024 when he sealed a 3–1 win over Samgurali.

Basiladze lifted the first trophy of his career on 3 July 2024 with Torpedo winning the four-team Georgian Super Cup tournament. Shortly, his existing contract with the club was extended up until December 2027.

During the 2025 season, Basiladze firmly established himself as a first-choice player and displayed his individual qualities, scoring six times, including a hat-trick against Samgurali. He made his debut in European football as well, featuring in three matches of the 2025-26 UEFA Conference League qualification round. While October turned out especially fruitful for Basiladze (three goals and three assists), the Erovnuli Liga named him as the best player of the third part of this season.

On 2 July 2026, Basiladze signed a five-year contract with Czech First League club Slovan Liberec.

== International career ==
Basiladze has played for each of Georgia's youth teams. At the age of 15, he was called up to the national U17 team for two friendlies against Azerbaijan in June 2021. He took part in five matches of the 2022 UEFA European Under-17 Championship qualifying campaign before joining the U18s. In his first game for the team against Luxembourg U19s, Basiladze scored in a 1–1 friendly draw in February 2023.

Four months later, Basiladze made his debut for the U19s against Azerbaijan. Later he played in all six ties of the qualifying campaign, scoring in a 3–2 win over Scotland.

As a member of the U21 team, Basiladze was initially called up for a 2027 UEFA European Under-21 Championship qualifier against Northern Ireland in September 2025. A month later, he was among those players who netted in a 5–0 away win over Malta.

== Career statistics ==
As of 6 December 2025

Appearances and goals by club, season and competition
Club	Season	League			National cup		European		Other		Total	
Club	Season	Division	Apps	Goals	Apps	Goals	Apps	Goals	Apps	Goals	Apps	Goals
Torpedo	2023	Erovnuli Liga	1	0	—		—		—		1	0
Torpedo	2024	Erovnuli Liga	14	1	—		—		—		14	1
Torpedo	2025	Erovnuli Liga	29	6	—		3 (Note: Appearances in UEFA Conference League qualifiers)	0	2 (Note: Appearances in Georgian Super Cup)	0	34	6
Career total			44	7	0	0	3	0	2	0	49	7

== Honours ==
Torpedo Kutaisi

- Georgian Super Cup
  - (gold) Winner, Gold medal: 2024
  - (bronze) Bronze medal: 2023, 2025
- Erovnuli Liga
  - (silver) Silver medal: 2024
  - (bronze) Bronze medal: 2023, 2025
