= Luka Tsulukidze =

Georgian footballer

Personal information
- Date of birth: 8 February 2004 (age 22)
- Place of birth: Zestaponi, Georgia
- Height: 1.75 m (5 ft 9 in)
- Position: Midfielder

Team information
- Current team: FC Dinamo Batumi
- Number: 20

Youth career
- –2021: FC Saburtalo Tbilisi

Senior career*
Years	Team	Apps	(Gls)
2021–2022	FC Saburtalo Tbilisi	2	(1)
2022–2023	FC Ural Yekaterinburg 2	1	(0)
2022–2023	FC Ural Yekaterinburg	1	(0)
2023	FC Dinamo Tbilisi 2 (loan)	13	(2)
2024	FC Locomotive Tbilisi	32	(5)
2025–	FC Dinamo Batumi	20	(3)

International career^{‡}
2021–2022	Georgia U-19	9	(3)
2022	Georgia U-18	6	(0)
2024–	Georgia U-21	2	(1)
- * Club domestic league appearances and goals as of 29 August 2025 ‡ National team caps and goals as of 9 September 2025

Luka Tsulukidze (Georgian: ლუკა წულუკიძე; born 8 February 2004) is a Georgian professional footballer who plays as a midfielder for FC Dinamo Batumi.

== Club career ==
He made his Erovnuli Liga debut for FC Saburtalo Tbilisi on 29 November 2021 in a game against FC Shukura Kobuleti.

On 17 July 2022, he signed a contract with FC Ural Yekaterinburg.

He made his debut in the Russian Premier League for FC Ural Yekaterinburg on 21 May 2023 in a game against PFC Krylia Sovetov Samara.

On 25 July 2023, Tsulukidze moved on a half-season loan to FC Dinamo Tbilisi.

On 24 January 2024, Tsulukidze's contract with Ural was terminated by mutual consent.
