= Theofanis Bakoulas =

Greek footballer

Personal information
- Date of birth: 4 January 2005 (age 21)
- Place of birth: Athens, Greece
- Height: 1.75 m (5 ft 9 in)
- Position: Defensive midfielder

Team information
- Current team: Olympiacos
- Number: 21

Youth career
- 2022–2024: Olympiacos

Senior career*
Years	Team	Apps	(Gls)
2024–	Olympiacos	0	(0)
2025–2026	→ Rio Ave (loan)	13	(1)
2026–	Olympiacos B	4	(0)

International career^{‡}
2024	Greece U19	6	(0)
2024–	Greece U21	9	(2)
- * Club domestic league appearances and goals as of 24 October 2026 ‡ National team caps and goals as of 26 September 2026

Theofanis Bakoulas (Greek: Θεοφάνης Μπακούλας, pronounced [θeoˈfanis ˈbakulas]; born 4 January 2005) is a Greek professional footballer who plays as an defensive midfielder for Super League club Olympiacos.

He has represented Greece at youth level and was part of the Olympiacos U19 team that competed in and won the 2023–24 UEFA Youth League.

== Career ==
Theofanis Bakoulas came through the youth system of Olympiacos. Operating primarily as a defensive or central midfielder, he progressed through the club's development ranks, establishing himself as a key player for Olympiacos U19. During the 2023–24 season, Bakoulas played a pivotal role in the UEFA Youth League, where Olympiacos secured a historical title—becoming the first Greek club to win a European competition at any level. In the final against AC Milan on 22 April 2024, he scored a notable bicycle kick to help secure a 3–0 victory.

On 3 February 2025, he joined Portuguese side Rio Ave on a loan from Olympiacos until the end of the season.

Bakoulas remained on loan at Rio Ave for a second consecutive season. However, on 9 September 2025, while representing the Greece U21 team in a UEFA European Under-21 Championship qualifier against Malta, he suffered a severe anterior cruciate ligament (ACL) injury early in the match, which sidelined him for an extended period. On 16 January 2026, Rio Ave prematurely terminated his loan deal, and Bakoulas returned to Olympiacos.

== Honours ==
Olympiacos Youth

- UEFA Youth League: 2023–24
