= Lampros Smyrlis =

Greek footballer

Personal information
- Date of birth: 12 July 2004 (age 22)
- Place of birth: Thessaloniki, Greece
- Height: 1.73 m (5 ft 8 in)
- Position: Winger

Team information
- Current team: Panetolikos
- Number: 7

Youth career
- 2015–2025: PAOK

Senior career*
Years	Team	Apps	(Gls)
2022–2025	PAOK B	43	(4)
2025–	Panetolikos	21	(1)

International career^{‡}
2022	Greece U18	3	(0)
2022–2023	Greece U19	8	(1)
2024–	Greece U21	8	(1)
- * Club domestic league appearances and goals as of 14 June 2026 ‡ National team caps and goals as of 30 May 2026

Lampros Smyrlis (Greek: Λάμπρος Σμυρλής; born 12 July 2004) is a Greek professional footballer who plays as a winger for Super League club Panetolikos.

== Career ==
In June 2025, Smyrlis signed a three-year contract with the club, keeping him at Panetolikos until 2028.

== Career statistics ==
As of 14 June 2026

Club	Season	League			Cup		Continental		Other		Total	
Club	Season	Division	Apps	Goals	Apps	Goals	Apps	Goals	Apps	Goals	Apps	Goals
PAOK B	2022–23	Superleague Greece 2	8	0	—		—		—		8	0
PAOK B	2023–24	Superleague Greece 2	7	1	—		—		—		7	1
PAOK B	2024–25	Superleague Greece 2	21	2	—		—		—		21	2
PAOK B	Total		43	4	—		—		—		43	4
Panetolikos	2025–26	Super League Greece	21	1	5	0	—		—		26	1
Career total			64	5	5	0	0	0	0	0	69	5
