= Dimitrios Keramitsis =

Greek footballer (born in 2004)

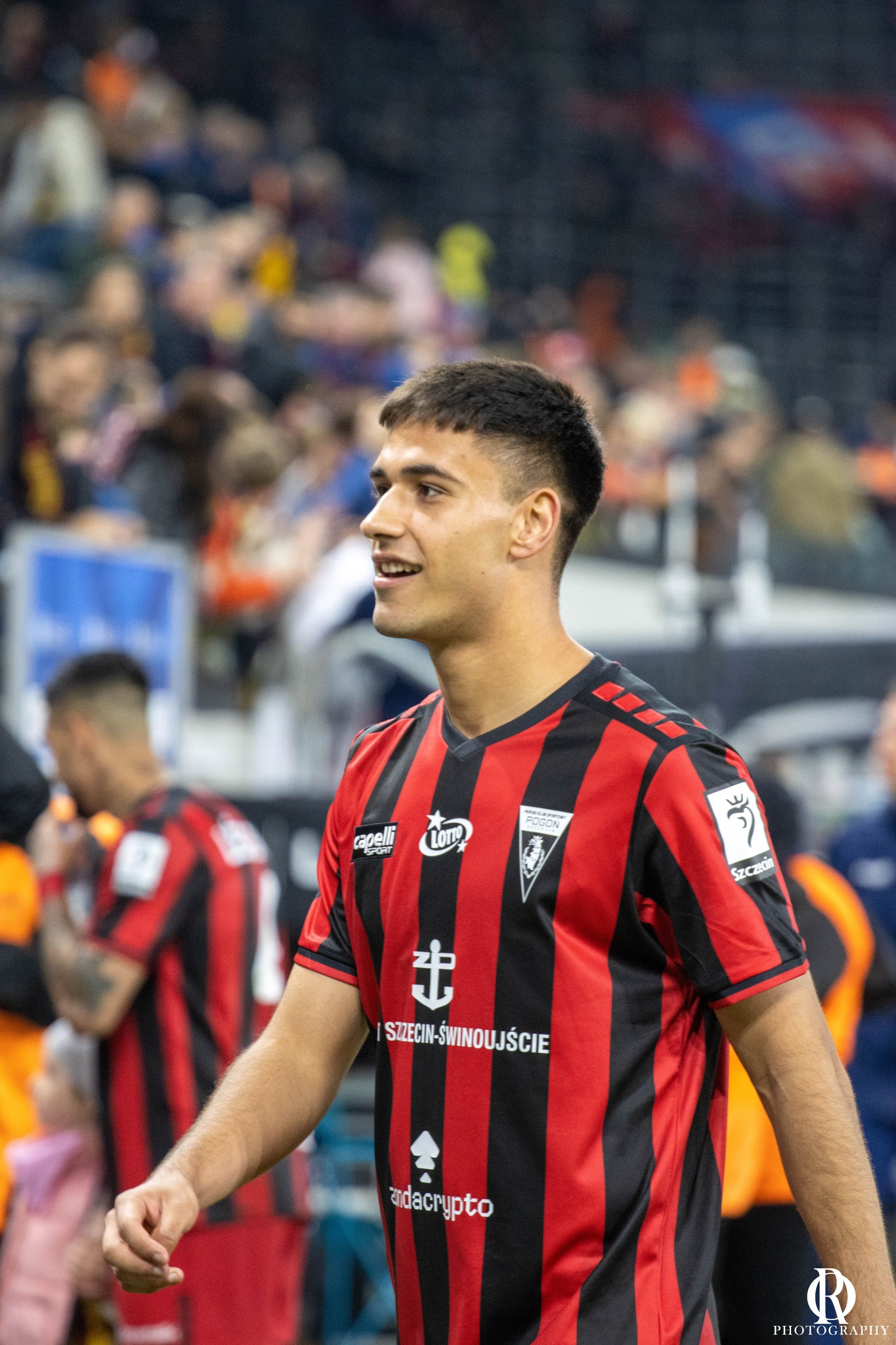
- Keramitsis with Pogoń Szczecin in 2025

Personal information
- Full name: Dimitrios Keramitsis
- Date of birth: 1 July 2004 (age 22)
- Place of birth: Thessaloniki, Greece
- Height: 1.93 m (6 ft 4 in)
- Position: Centre-back

Team information
- Current team: Pogoń Szczecin
- Number: 13

Youth career
- Aris
- PAOK
- Apollon Pontus
- 2020–2021: Empoli
- 2021–2024: Roma

Senior career*
Years	Team	Apps	(Gls)
2022–2024	Roma	1	(0)
2024–	Pogoń Szczecin	47	(2)
2024–2025	Pogoń Szczecin II	6	(1)

International career^{‡}
2022	Greece U18	3	(0)
2022–2023	Greece U19	9	(0)
2025–	Greece U21	5	(1)
- * Club domestic league appearances and goals as of 19:14, 12 November 2026 (UTC) ‡ National team caps and goals as of 23:20, 17 November 2026 (UTC)

Dimitrios Keramitsis (Greek: Δημήτριος Κεραμίτσης; born 1 July 2004) is a Greek professional footballer who plays as a centre-back for Ekstraklasa club Pogoń Szczecin.

== Club career ==
=== Youth career ===
Having started to play football in Thessaloniki, where he was born, Dimitrios Keramitsis then played for the likes of PAOK and Aris Thessaloniki, before joining the Empoli academy in Italy in the summer of 2020.

=== AS Roma ===
Instrumental in his team under-19 top Italian division title, he attracted the attention of several Serie A clubs, eventually joining AS Roma one year after his arrival in Italy. There he soon became a key member of Alberto De Rossi's Primavera squad.

Brought to the first team squad by José Mourinho, he made his professional debut for Roma on 16 January 2022, replacing Maitland-Niles in the last moments of a 1–0 home Serie A win against Cagliari. By doing so, he became the first player born in 2004 to play for the club, and the third-youngest foreigner, behind his compatriot Lampros Choutos.

During the 2022–23 season, he was part of Roma's under-19 squad that won the Coppa Italia Primavera, having scored the winning goal in the final against Fiorentina.

=== Pogoń Szczecin ===
On 6 September 2024, Keramitsis signed a three-year deal with Polish Ekstraklasa club Pogoń Szczecin. He made his debut for Pogoń's reserve team on 15 September 2024, in a 1–1 draw against Unia Swarzędz. On 20 October, he made his Ekstraklasa debut in a 1–0 away loss over Raków Częstochowa. In the 65th minute of that match, he was given a straight red card for fouling Adriano Amorim. One month later, on 24 November 2024, Keramitsis was shown a second yellow card during a 0–0 draw played against Elana Toruń in Pogoń's reserve team.

== International career ==
In July 2023, Keramitsis was included in the Greek under-19 squad that took part in the 2023 UEFA European Under-19 Championship.

== Style of play ==
A right-footed centre-back with proficiency using his left foot, he is noted for his ability to distribute possession from the defensive line. Media and tactical analyses describe him as a physical defender capable of tight marking, possessing strong positional timing, and holding versatility across both three- and four-man defensive systems.

In his early career, his origins and his debut at Roma soon earned him comparisons with the international defender Kostas Manolas.

== Personal life ==
His paternal hails is from Lepti Evros.

== Honours ==
Empoli U19

- Campionato Primavera: 2020–21

Roma U19

- Coppa Italia Primavera: 2022–23
