= Giorgi Tabatadze =

Georgian footballer (born 2005)

Personal information
- Date of birth: 29 October 2005 (age 21)
- Place of birth: Georgia
- Position: Defender

Team information
- Current team: Vejle
- Number: 21

Youth career
- –2023: Saburtalo

Senior career*
Years	Team	Apps	(Gls)
2024–2025	Iberia 1999	31	(3)
2024–2025	→ Iberia 1999 B	6	(4)
2025–	Vejle	11	(1)

International career^{‡}
2021–2022	Georgia U17	6	(2)
2022	Georgia U18	1	(1)
2023	Georgia U19	4	(0)
- * Club domestic league appearances and goals as of 19 May 2026 ‡ National team caps and goals as of 20 August 2025

Giorgi Tabatadze (Georgian: გიორგი ტაბატაძე; born 29 October 2005) is a Georgian professional footballer who plays as a left-back for Danish Superliga club Vejle.

He has won the Erovnuli Liga with Iberia 1999 and represented his country in the youth national teams.

== Club ==
Giorgi Tabatadze is a product of the academy of Iberia 1999. Having played for their youth teams, he was promoted to the senior team in 2024. Tabatadze made his Erovnuli Liga debut against Gagra on 29 May 2024 when he came on the pitch to replace Shota Nonikashvili. As his club won the league title for the second time in history, Tabatadze contributed to this triumph with 11 appearances. In the same season, he helped the reserve team with four goals to gain its first ever promotion to the 2nd division.

On the first day of a new season, Tabatadze opened his goal-scoring account for the team, sealing a 2–0 win over Telavi. Later in August, he bagged a brace against Dila, making it overall three goals and eight assists for the team. He also made three appearances in UEFA European competitions, the first being a Champions League qualifier against Swedish side Malmö FF.

On 19 August 2025, Danish Superliga club Vejle Boldklub announced the signing of a five-year deal with Tabatadze. On 2 November, he scored his first goal for the team in a 2–1 loss to Sonderjyske.

== International ==
Tabatadze has played for each of Georgia's youth teams. He was first called up to the national U17 team for two friendlies against Azerbaijan in June 2021. Tabatadze's curling long-distance shot from a free kick in a 2–1 win was labeled by one of the sport outlets as a masterpiece. In early 2022, he scored in a Development Cup match against Moldova held in Minsk.

After four more appearances for U17s, Tabatadze became a member of the U19 team. He took part in all three games of the 2023 UEFA European under-19 Championship qualifying campaign.

== Career statistics ==
As of 3 May 2026

Appearances and goals by club, season and competition
Club	Season	League			National cup		European		Other		Total	
Club	Season	Division	Apps	Goals	Apps	Goals	Apps	Goals	Apps	Goals	Apps	Goals
Iberia 1999	2024	Erovnuli Liga	11	0	—		—		—		11	0
Iberia 1999	2025	Erovnuli Liga	20	3	—		3 (Note: Two appearances in UEFA Champions League qualifiers and one appearance in UEFA Conference League qualifier)	0	2 (Note: Appearances in Georgian Super Cup)	0	25	0
Iberia 1999	Total		31	3	0	0	3	0	2	0	36	3
Iberia 1999 B	2024	Liga 3	3	4	—		—		1 (Note: Appearance in Liga 2/3 playoffs)	0	4	4
Iberia 1999 B	2025	Erovnuli Liga 2	3	0	—		—		—		3	0
Iberia 1999 B	Total		6	4	0	0	0	0	1	0	7	4
Vejle Boldklub	2025–26	Danish Superliga	11	1	2	0	–		–		13	1
Career total			48	8	2	0	3	0	3	0	56	8

== Honours ==
=== Club ===
Iberia 1999

- Erovnuli Liga: 2024

=== Individual ===
- Aleksandre Chivadze silver medal for U17 players: 2021
