= Mattias Ellul =

Maltese footballer

Personal information
- Full name: Mattias Ellul
- Date of birth: 3 December 2004 (age 21)
- Place of birth: Malta
- Height: 1.78 m (5 ft 10 in)
- Position: Defender

Team information
- Current team: Ħamrun Spartans
- Number: 3

Youth career
- –2022: St. Andrews

Senior career*
Years	Team	Apps	(Gls)
2022–2023	St. Andrews	23	(1)
2023–2024	Santa Lucia	25	(1)
2024–	Ħamrun Spartans	15	(0)

International career^{‡}
2022–2023	Malta U19	9	(0)
2023–	Malta U21	7	(0)
2026–	Malta	1	(0)
- * Club domestic league appearances and goals as of 26 June 2025 ‡ National team caps and goals as of 20:00, 12 November 2026

Mattias Ellul (born 3 December 2004) is a Maltese professional footballer who plays as a defender for Ħamrun Spartans and the Malta national team.

== Club career ==
Ellul began his career playing for the youth team of St. Andrews, before making his league debut for their senior team in the Challenge League. Just over a year later, on 11 August 2023, he signed for Santa Lucia, making his debut against Floriana. Santa Lucia were relegated on the final day of the season, and in early June, it was announced that he would join Ħamrun Spartans, reuniting with his former manager Alessandro Zinnari, who had joined them from Santa Lucia after their relegation.

== International career ==
Ellul represented Malta at youth level before receiving his first call up to the senior team on 1 September 2024.

== Career statistics ==
=== Club ===
As of 5 September 2024

Appearances and goals by club and year
Club	Year	Apps	Goals
St. Andrews	2021–22	1	0
St. Andrews	2022–23	22	1
Santa Lucia	2023–24	27	1
Ħamrun Spartans	2024–25	5	0
Total		55	2
