= 2009 UEFA European Under-21 Championship =

2009 UEFA Under-21 Championship
2009 UEFA European Under-21 Championship U21-Europamästerskapet för herrar 2009

Tournament details
- Host country: Sweden
- Dates: 15–29 June
- Teams: 8 (finals); 51 (qualifying)
- Venue: 4 (in 4 host cities)

Final positions
- Champions: Germany (1st title)
- Runners-up: England

Tournament statistics
- Matches played: 15
- Goals scored: 38 (2.53 per match)
- Attendance: 163,090 (10,873 per match)
- Top scorer: (Sweden) Marcus Berg (7 goals)
- Best player: (Sweden) Marcus Berg

The 2009 UEFA European Under-21 Championship began on 15 June 2009, and was the 17th UEFA European Under-21 Championship. This was the first tournament after the competition reverted to a two-year format, following the single-year 2006–07 competition, which allowed the change to odd-numbered years. Sweden hosted the final tournament in June 2009; therefore, their under-21 team qualified automatically. Players born on or after 1 January 1986 were eligible to play in this competition.

== Qualification ==
The qualifying draw split the nations onto 10 groups of 5 or 6 teams. The seeding pots are formed on the basis of former performance in the tournament. Ten group winners along with four best-ranked runners-up advanced to the play-offs. Seven winners of the play-off pairs qualified for the final tournament.

=== Qualified teams ===
- Sweden as host nation
- Belarus
- England
- Finland
- Germany
- Italy
- Spain
- Serbia

The finals' tournament draw took place on 3 December 2008 at the Svenska Mässan exhibition centre, Gothenburg. Prior to the final draw, Sweden had been seeded first in Group A as hosts of the tournament, while Spain were seeded first in Group B.

== Final draw ==
Pot A

- Sweden assigned to A1
- Spain assigned to B1

Pot B

- England
- Italy

Pot C

- Serbia
- Finland
- Germany
- Belarus

The first pot contained the top seeds, these would have been host nation Sweden and the reigning champions, The Netherlands. However, The Netherlands did not qualify meaning that the team with the best qualifying record, Spain, took their place. Sweden and Spain were then automatically assigned to A1 and B1 respectively. The second pot contained the teams with the next two best records in qualifying: these were England and Italy. England were drawn into position B3 and Italy into A3. The final pot contained the other four qualified teams: Serbia, Finland, Germany and Belarus. Belarus were drawn first into position A2, Germany went into B2, Serbia into A4 and Finland into B4.

== Venues ==
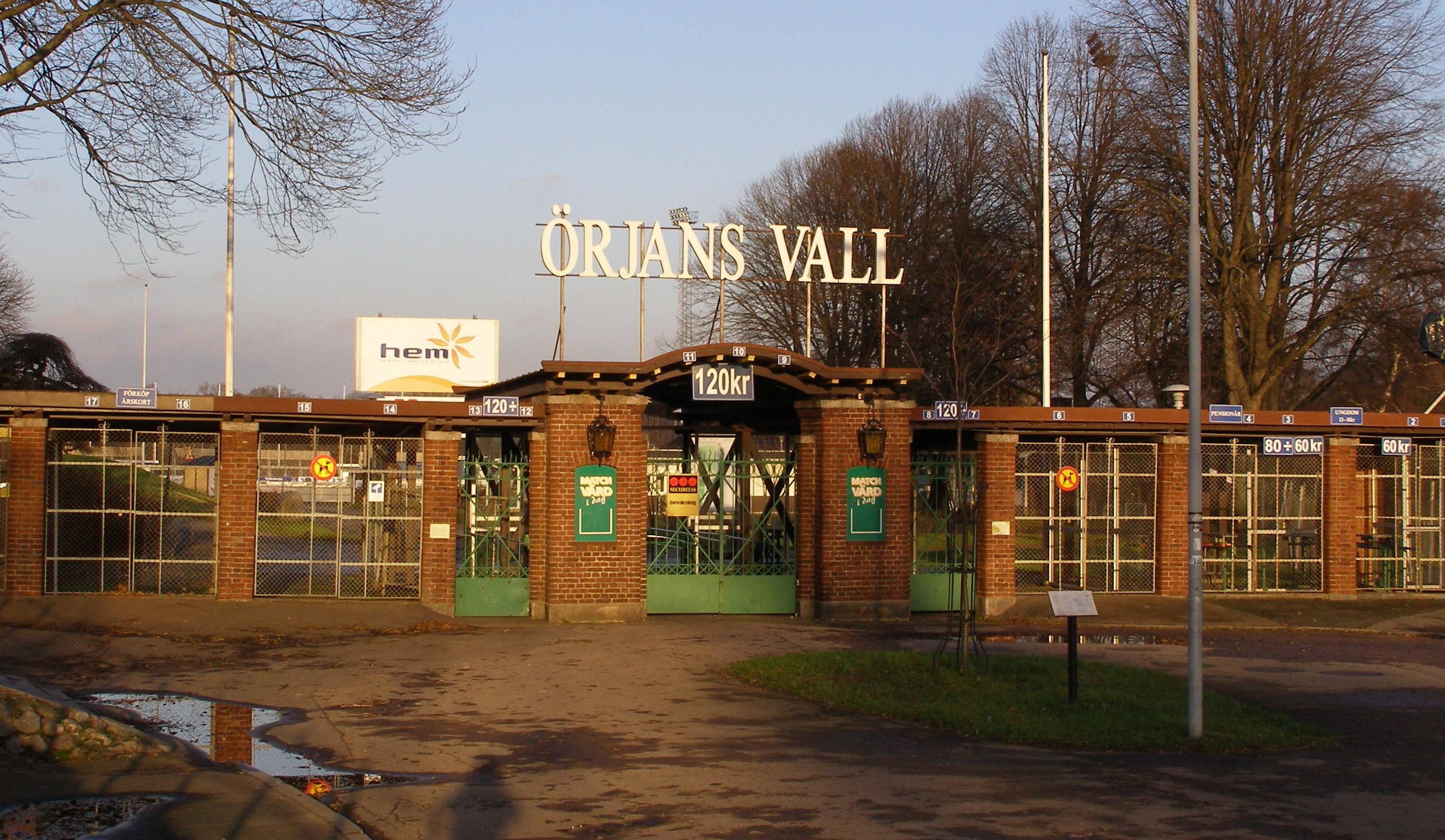
Örjans Vall, seen from the entrance

The following venues were chosen to hold the final tournament matches:

| Stadium | Location | Normal capacity | Tournament capacity |
|---|---|---|---|
| Swedbank Stadion | Malmö | 24,000 | 21,000 |
| Gamla Ullevi | Gothenburg | 18,800 | 16,700 |
| Olympia | Helsingborg | 17,000 | 12,000 |
| Örjans Vall | Halmstad | 15,500 | 8,000 |

=== Sponsorship issues ===
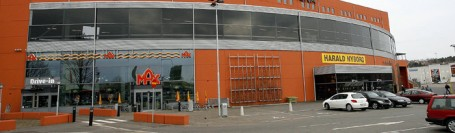
The Max restaurant at Borås Arena.

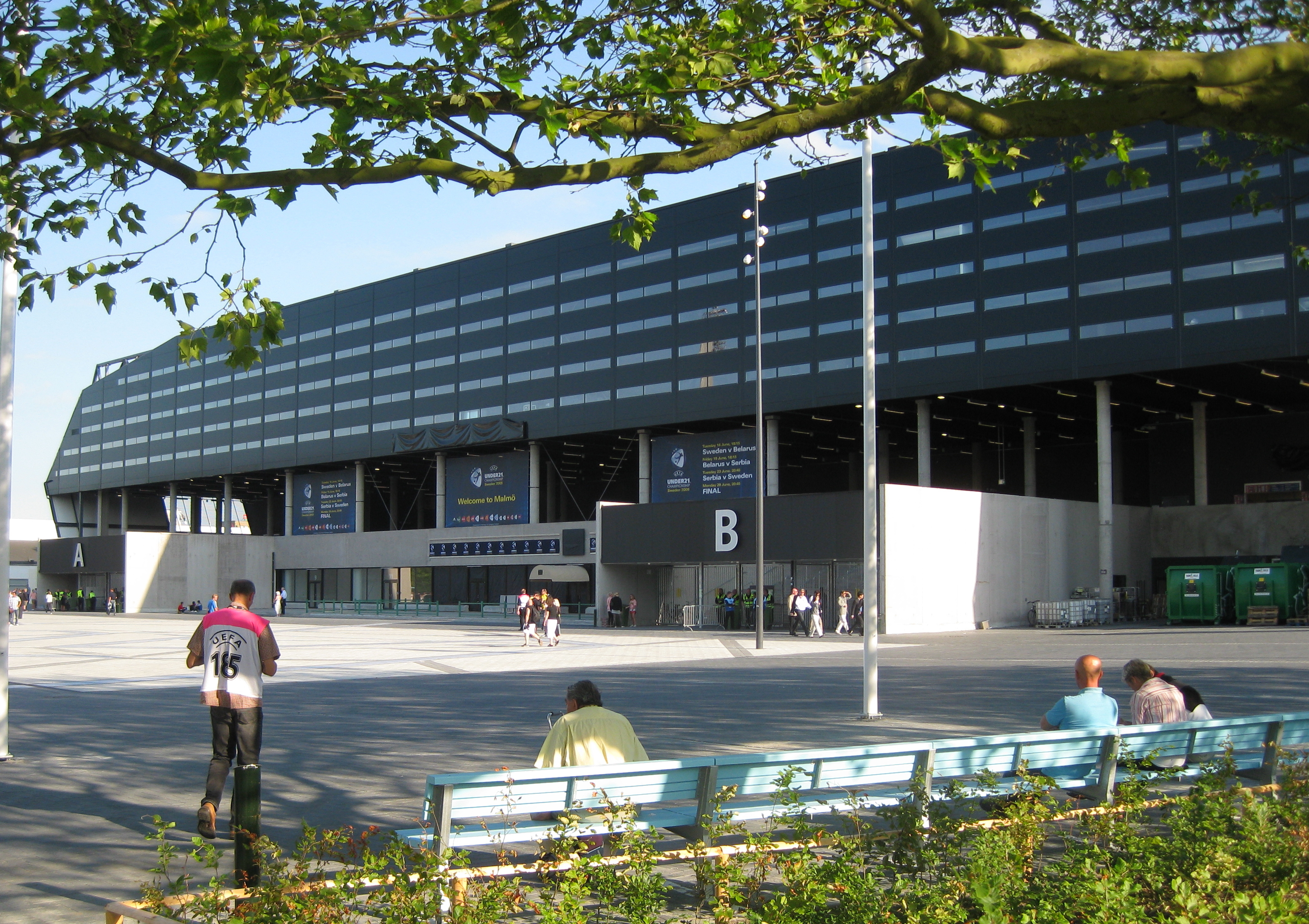
Swedbank Stadion without the Swedbank Stadion logo.

Following the refusal of the Swedish hamburger chain Max to close their restaurant at Borås Arena during the tournament (as they are not an official UEFA sponsor), UEFA disqualified Borås Arena from hosting games during the tournament. There is a contract between UEFA and the city and between UEFA and its sponsors saying that the UEFA sponsors shall have monopoly around the arena. A city cannot force Max to close down even if it happened to sign a contract with someone saying so, as Max have a tenancy agreement with the city. The first news on the issue was published on 1 April 2008, making many believe it was an April fools joke.

On 2 September 2008, the Swedish Football Association nominated Örjans Vall in Halmstad as a replacement venue for Borås Arena, and they officially became the fourth host city a few days later. They were awarded the three group stage games that were to be hosted by Borås Arena, while the second semi-final was moved from Borås to Helsingborg and Olympia.

Swedbank Stadion was referred to as Malmö New Stadium during the tournament, as Swedbank – which owned the naming rights to the stadium at the time – were not official UEFA sponsors.

== Matches ==
All times are Central European Summer Time (UTC+2).

=== Group stage ===
==== Group A ====
| Team | Pld | W | D | L | GF | GA | GD | Pts |
|---|---|---|---|---|---|---|---|---|
| Italy | 3 | 2 | 1 | 0 | 4 | 2 | +2 | 7 |
| Sweden | 3 | 2 | 0 | 1 | 9 | 4 | +5 | 6 |
| Serbia | 3 | 0 | 2 | 1 | 1 | 3 | −2 | 2 |
| Belarus | 3 | 0 | 1 | 2 | 2 | 7 | −5 | 1 |

16 June 2009
18:15

| Sweden | 5–1 | Belarus |
|---|---|---|
| Martynovich 34' (o.g.); Berg 38', 44', 81'; Svensson 89' | Report | Kislyak 33' |

Malmö New Stadium, Malmö
Attendance: 14,623
Referee: Claudio Circhetta (Switzerland)
16 June 2009
20:45

| Italy | 0–0 | Serbia |
|---|---|---|
| | Report |

Olympia, Helsingborg
Attendance: 7,158
Referee: Pedro Proença (Portugal)

19 June 2009
16:00

| Sweden | 1–2 | Italy |
|---|---|---|
| Toivonen 89' | Report | Balotelli 23'; Acquafresca 53' |

Olympia, Helsingborg
Attendance: 11,618
Referee: Tony Chapron (France)
19 June 2009
18:15

| Belarus | 0–0 | Serbia |
|---|---|---|
| | Report |

Malmö New Stadium, Malmö
Attendance: 3,313
Referee: Cüneyt Çakır (Turkey)

23 June 2009
20:45

| Serbia | 1–3 | Sweden |
|---|---|---|
| Kačar 27' | Report | Berg 7', 15' (pen.); Toivonen 29' |

Malmö New Stadium, Malmö
Attendance: 19,820
Referee: Pedro Proença (Portugal)
23 June 2009
20:45

| Belarus | 1–2 | Italy |
|---|---|---|
| Kislyak 45' | Report | Acquafresca 45+3' (pen.), 75' |

Olympia, Helsingborg
Attendance: 3,014
Referee: Claudio Circhetta (Switzerland)

==== Group B ====
| Team | Pld | W | D | L | GF | GA | GD | Pts |
|---|---|---|---|---|---|---|---|---|
| England | 3 | 2 | 1 | 0 | 5 | 2 | +3 | 7 |
| Germany | 3 | 1 | 2 | 0 | 3 | 1 | +2 | 5 |
| Spain | 3 | 1 | 1 | 1 | 2 | 2 | 0 | 4 |
| Finland | 3 | 0 | 0 | 3 | 1 | 6 | −5 | 0 |

15 June 2009
18:15

| England | 2–1 | Finland |
|---|---|---|
| Cattermole 15'; Richards 53' | Report | Sparv 33' (pen.) |

Örjans Vall, Halmstad
Attendance: 6,828
Referee: Cüneyt Çakır (Turkey)
15 June 2009
20:45

| Spain | 0–0 | Germany |
|---|---|---|
| | Report |

Gamla Ullevi, Gothenburg
Attendance: 15,827
Referee: Tony Chapron (France)

18 June 2009
18:15

| Germany | 2–0 | Finland |
|---|---|---|
| Höwedes 59'; Dejagah 61' | Report |

Örjans Vall, Halmstad
Attendance: 6,011
Referee: Peter Rasmussen (Denmark)
18 June 2009
20:45

| Spain | 0–2 | England |
|---|---|---|
| | Report | Campbell 67'; Milner 73' |

Gamla Ullevi, Gothenburg
Attendance: 16,123
Referee: Björn Kuipers (Netherlands)

22 June 2009
20:45

| Finland | 0–2 | Spain |
|---|---|---|
| | Report | Torrejón 29'; León 55' |

Gamla Ullevi, Gothenburg
Attendance: 8,093
Referee: Björn Kuipers (Netherlands)
22 June 2009
20:45

| Germany | 1–1 | England |
|---|---|---|
| Castro 5' | Report | Rodwell 30' |

Örjans Vall, Halmstad
Attendance: 7,414
Referee: Peter Rasmussen (Denmark)

=== Knockout stage ===
Semi-finals
26 June – Helsingborg
Italy | 0
Germany | 1
26 June – Gothenburg
England (p) | 3 (5)
Sweden | 3 (4)

Final
29 June – Malmö
Germany | 4
England | 0

==== Semi-finals ====
26 June 2009
18:00

| England | 3–3 (a.e.t.) | Sweden |
|---|---|---|
| Cranie 1'; Onuoha 27'; Bjärsmyr 38' (o.g.) | Report | Berg 68', 81'; Toivonen 75' |
Penalties
| Milner (penalty missed); Hart (penalty scored); Cattermole (penalty scored); Johnson (penalty scored); Walcott (penalty scored); Gibbs (penalty scored) | 5–4 | (penalty missed) Berg; (penalty scored) Elm; (penalty scored) Bjärsmyr; (penalty scored) Lustig; (penalty scored) R. Bengtsson; (penalty missed) Molins |

Gamla Ullevi, Gothenburg
Attendance: 16,385
Referee: Cüneyt Çakır (Turkey)

26 June 2009
20:45

| Italy | 0–1 | Germany |
|---|---|---|
| | Report | Beck 48' |

Olympia, Helsingborg
Attendance: 8,094
Referee: Pedro Proença (Portugal)

==== Final ====
29 June 2009
20:45

| Germany | 4–0 | England |
|---|---|---|
| Castro 23'; Özil 48'; Wagner 79', 84' | Report |

Malmö New Stadium, Malmö
Attendance: 18,769
Referee: Björn Kuipers (Netherlands)

| Germany | England |

| GK | 1 | Manuel Neuer |
| CB | 4 | Benedikt Höwedes |
| CB | 15 | Mats Hummels | | (substituted off) 83' |
| CB | 5 | Jérôme Boateng |
| RWB | 2 | Andreas Beck |
| LWB | 3 | Sebastian Boenisch | (yellow card) 65' |
| DM | 8 | Sami Khedira (c) |
| RM | 10 | Mesut Özil | | (substituted off) 89' |
| CM | 20 | Gonzalo Castro |
| LM | 14 | Fabian Johnson | | (substituted off) 69' |
| CF | 13 | Sandro Wagner | (yellow card) 84' |
Substitutions:
| DF | 16 | Daniel Schwaab | | (substituted in) 69' |
| DF | 6 | Dennis Aogo | | (substituted in) 83' |
| DF | 19 | Marcel Schmelzer | | (substituted in) 89' |
Coach:
(Germany) Horst Hrubesch

| GK | 22 | Scott Loach |
| RB | 2 | Martin Cranie | (substituted off) 79' |
| CB | 17 | Micah Richards |
| CB | 6 | Nedum Onuoha | (substituted off) 46' |
| LB | 19 | Kieran Gibbs |
| DM | 4 | Lee Cattermole |
| RM | 12 | Fabrice Muamba | (substituted off) 78' |
| CM | 10 | Mark Noble (c) |
| LM | 7 | James Milner |
| CF | 14 | Theo Walcott |
| CF | 11 | Adam Johnson |
Substitutions:
| DF | 18 | Michael Mancienne | (substituted in) 46' |
| MF | 15 | Jack Rodwell | (substituted in) 78' |
| MF | 8 | Craig Gardner | (substituted in) 79' |
Coach:
(England) Stuart Pearce

Man of the Match:
Mesut Özil (Germany)

Assistant referees:
Joël De Bruyn (Belgium)
György Ring (Hungary)
Fourth official:
Pedro Proença (Portugal)

== Goalscorers ==
7 goals

- (Sweden) Marcus Berg

3 goals

- (Italy) Robert Acquafresca
- (Sweden) Ola Toivonen

2 goals

- (Belarus) Syarhey Kislyak
- (Germany) Gonzalo Castro
- (Germany) Sandro Wagner

1 goal

- (England) Fraizer Campbell
- (England) Lee Cattermole
- (England) Martin Cranie
- (England) James Milner
- (England) Nedum Onuoha
- (England) Micah Richards
- (England) Jack Rodwell

1 goal, cont.

- (Finland) Tim Sparv
- (Germany) Andreas Beck
- (Germany) Ashkan Dejagah
- (Germany) Benedikt Höwedes
- (Germany) Mesut Özil
- (Italy) Mario Balotelli
- (Serbia) Gojko Kačar
- (Spain) Pedro León
- (Spain) Marc Torrejón
- (Sweden) Gustav Svensson

Own goals

- (Belarus) Alyaksandr Martynovich (for Sweden)
- (Sweden) Mattias Bjärsmyr (for England)

== Match ball ==
The match ball for the competition is called the Adidas Terrapass, which was unveiled at the tournament draw in Gothenburg on 3 December. The ball is bright blue and yellow, the colours of the Swedish flag. It features 12 watermarks including one containing a map of Europe and one of the tournament logo. It is composed of 14 thermally bonded panels, which are claimed to improve the ball's accuracy and swerve.
