= Aleksandre Narimanidze =

Georgian footballer (born 2005)

Personal information
- Date of birth: 3 June 2005 (age 21)
- Place of birth: Georgia
- Height: 1.92 m (6 ft 4 in)
- Position: Defender

Team information
- Current team: Žilina
- Number: 28

Youth career
- 2010–2022: Saburtalo

Senior career*
Years	Team	Apps	(Gls)
2023–2024	Iberia 1999	16	(0)
2025–	Žilina	42	(1)
2025–	Žilina B	6	(0)

International career^{‡}
2021–2022	Georgia U17	6	(2)
2023–2024	Georgia U19	5	(0)
- * Club domestic league appearances and goals as of 21 September 2026 ‡ National team caps and goals as of 29 April 2025

Aleksandre "Sandro" Narimanidze (Georgian: ალექსანდრე ნარიმანიძე; born 3 June 2005) is a Georgian professional footballer who plays as a centre-back for Slovak club Žilina.

Narimanidze is the winner of Georgian top league and cup competitions with Iberia 1999. He has also been a member of national youth teams.

== Club career ==
Narimanidze joined Saburtalo's academy at the age of five and went through all age groups until making his debut as a substitute for the senior team on 2 December 2023. Four days later, he was a member of the squad that beat the crowned league champions Dinamo Batumi in the cup final.

In the same year, Narimanidze made a big impact on Saburtalo's U19 league triumph. As the team claimed their first league title, he was individually selected as Player of the Year at an annual ceremony hosted by the Football Federation and awarded the Aleksandre Chivadze medal for U19 players.

Narimanidze had a successful season in 2024 when he was given much more playing time during the league, Supercup and cup games. He took part in both Liga 2/3 playoff ties, helping Saburtalo's reserve team to advance to the 2nd division. But most importantly, Narimanidze became the league champion with Saburtalo, now renamed as Iberia 1999, contributing with 15 appearances to this achievement.

In February 2025, Narimanidze moved to Slovak side Žilina on a deal until June 2028.

== International career ==
Narimanidze was called up as a member of the Georgia U17 team in 2022. He played all six matches in full in the 2022 UEFA European Championship qualifying campaign and scored twice, including a winner against Hungary that sent the team through to the second qualifying round.

Later, Narimanidze captained the U19 team during the two phases of its 2024 UEFA European Championship qualifiers.

== Career statistics ==
As of 27 April 2025

Appearances and goals by club, season and competition
Club	Season	League			National cup (Note: Includes Georgian Cup, Slovak Cup)		Continental		Other		Total	
Club	Season	Division	Apps	Goals	Apps	Goals	Apps	Goals	Apps	Goals	Apps	Goals
Saburtalo / Iberia 1999	2023	Erovnuli Liga	1	0	—		—		—		1	0
Saburtalo / Iberia 1999	2024	Erovnuli Liga	15	0	1	0	—		2 (Note: Appearances in Georgian Super Cup)	0	18	0
Saburtalo / Iberia 1999	Total		16	0	1	0	0	0	2	0	19	0
Iberia-2 1999	2024	Liga 3	—		—		—		2 (Note: Appearances in Liga 2/3 playoffs)	0	2	0
Žilina	2024–25	Slovak First Football League	5	0	—		—		—		5	0
Žilina B	2024–25	2. Liga	2	0	—		—		—		2	0
Career total			23	0	1	0	0	0	4	0	28	0

== Honours ==
Saburtalo / Iberia 1999

- Erovnuli Liga: 2024
- Georgian Cup: 2023

Žilina

- Slovak Cup: 2025–26

Individual

- Erovnuli Liga U19 Player of the Year: 2023
