= Milovan Đorić =

Serbian football manager and player

Personal information
- Date of birth: 6 August 1945 (age 81)
- Place of birth: Bioska, FS Serbia, DF Yugoslavia
- Position: Defender

Youth career
- Železničar Titovo Užice

Senior career*
Years	Team	Apps	(Gls)
1963–1967	Sloboda Titovo Užice		
1967–1973	Red Star Belgrade	136	(7)
1973–1975	Oviedo	32	(0)

International career
1969	Yugoslavia	1	(0)

Managerial career
- 1981: Napredak Kruševac
- 1983–1986: Sutjeska Nikšić
- 1986: Sloboda Titovo Užice
- 1986–1987: Priština
- 1988: El Salvador
- 1989: Águila
- 1990–1991: Sutjeska Nikšić
- 1991: Budućnost Titograd
- 1993: Borac Čačak
- 1993: Radnički Niš
- 1994: Jastrebac Niš
- 1995: Kolubara
- 1996: Águila
- 1997: El Salvador
- 1998: Águila
- 1998–2000: FR Yugoslavia U21
- 2000: Beijing Guoan
- 2001: FR Yugoslavia
- 2010–2011: Serbia U17
- * Club domestic league appearances and goals

Milovan Đorić (Serbian Cyrillic: Милован Ђорић; born 6 August 1945) is a Serbian former football manager and player.

== Club career ==
Đorić joined Sloboda Titovo Užice in 1963, helping the club win promotion to the Yugoslav Second League in 1965. He was signed by Red Star Belgrade in 1967. During his six seasons with the club, Đorić won four Yugoslav First League titles and three Yugoslav Cups, including two doubles.

In 1973, Đorić moved abroad to Spain and signed with Oviedo. He missed most of his debut season due to an Achilles injury, as the club suffered relegation from the La Liga. After helping Oviedo return to the top flight the next year, Đorić retired from playing.

== International career ==
At international level, Đorić was capped once for Yugoslavia, playing the full 90 minutes in a 1–1 home friendly draw with Romania on 3 September 1969.

== Managerial career ==
Upon his second stint in El Salvador, Đorić took charge of the FR Yugoslavia national under-21 team ahead of their qualification campaign for the 2000 UEFA European Under-21 Championship. He faced significant backlash following a shocking 6–2 home loss to Croatia in Yugoslavia's third group match. After refusing to resign, Đorić led the team to a second-place finish to secure a play-off spot, but lost 3–0 to England in a one-legged tie.

In February 2001, Đorić was appointed as manager of the national team of FR Yugoslavia. He was dismissed after three winless World Cup qualifying games in charge. Following a 1–0 home loss to Russia, Đorić was heavily criticized for making bizarre substitutions and tactical changes during the game. He also conflicted with Predrag Mijatović prior to the match, with Mijatović deciding to leave the team immediately.

Đorić lastly served as manager of the Serbia under-17 side, resigning after the team's disappointing performance at the 2011 UEFA European Under-17 Championship held on home soil.

== Honours ==
=== Player ===
Red Star Belgrade

- Yugoslav First League: 1967–68, 1968–69, 1969–70, 1972–73
- Yugoslav Cup: 1967–68, 1969–70, 1970–71

Oviedo

- Segunda División: 1974–75

=== Manager ===
Sutjeska Nikšić

- Yugoslav Second League: 1983–84 (Group East)
