= 2000 UEFA European Under-21 Championship qualification Group 1 =

Football tournament qualification stage

The teams competing in Group 1 of the 2000 UEFA European Under-21 Championship qualifying competition were Belarus, Denmark, Italy, Switzerland and Wales.

== Standings ==
Team	Pld	W	D	L	GF	GA	GD	Pts
Italy	8	7	1	0	20	7	+13	22
Switzerland	8	4	2	2	8	4	+4	14
Denmark	8	3	1	4	11	13	−2	10
Belarus	8	2	1	5	5	12	−7	7
Wales	8	0	3	5	6	14	−8	3

	(Belarus)	(Denmark)	(Italy)	(Switzerland)	(Wales)
Belarus	—	0–2	1–2	1–0	1–0
Denmark	2–0	—	1–2	1–3	2–2
Italy	4–1	3–1	—	1–0	6–2
Switzerland	2–1	2–0	0–0	—	1–0
Wales	0–0	1–2	1–2	0–0	—

== Matches ==
All times are CET.

4 September 1998
16:00

Belarus	0 – 2	Denmark
	Report	C.Jensen 27'; Rommedahl 43'

City Stadium, Borisov
Referee: Dietmar Drabek (Austria)
4 September 1998
18:00

Wales	1 – 2	Italy
Bellamy 46'	Report	Mezzano 14'; Comandini 25'

Racecourse Ground, Wrexham
Referee: Attila Juhos (Hungary)

9 October 1998
19:30

Denmark	2 – 2	Wales
Rommedahl 16'; Madsen 63'	Report	Haworth 9'; Thomas 45'

Odense Stadion, Odense
Referee: Slavik Kazaryan (Armenia)
9 October 1998
20:45

Italy	1 – 0	Switzerland
Pirlo 53'	Report

Stadio Giovanni Zini, Cremona
Referee: Frank De Bleeckere (Belgium)

13 October 1998
19:00

Switzerland	2 – 0	Denmark
H.Yakin 58'; Cabanas 89'	Report

Stadion FC Solothurn, Solothurn
Referee: Georgios Fassolis (Greece)
13 October 1998
20:30

Wales	0 – 0	Belarus
	Report

Jenner Park Stadium, Barry
Referee: Oleg Timofejev (Estonia)

26 March 1999
19:30

Denmark	1 – 2	Italy
Rommedahl 4'	Report	Pirlo 36'; Ventola 90'

Odense Stadion, Odense
Referee: Eric Blareau (Belgium)

30 March 1999
19:00

Switzerland	1 – 0	Wales
H.Yakin 2'	Report

Stadion Schützenwiese, Winterthur
Referee: Victor José Esquinas Torres (Spain)
31 March 1999
16:00

Italy	4 – 1	Belarus
Pirlo 24', 51'; Scarlato 43'; Bucchi 79'	Report	Razumaw 5'

Stadio Rubens Fadini, Giulianova
Referee: Kenny Clark (Scotland)

4 June 1999
19:30

Denmark	2 – 0	Belarus
Lektonen 31'; Rommedahl 57'	Report

Odense Stadion, Odense
Referee: Ivan Dobrinov (Bulgaria)
4 June 1999
20:45

Italy	6 – 2	Wales
Ventola 9', 72', 86'; Pirlo 62'; Comandini 76'; Vannucchi 78'	Report	Jeanne 28'; Jones 67'

Stadio Paolo Mazza, Ferrara
Referee: Constantin Zotta (Romania)

8 June 1999
20:30

Wales	1 – 2	Denmark
Evans 12'	Report	Smith 2'; Alkhag 73'

Racecourse Ground, Wrexham
Referee: Manfred Schüttengruber (Austria)
10 June 1999
20:45

Switzerland	0 – 0	Italy
	Report

Charmilles Stadium, Geneva
Referee: Alain Hamer (Luxembourg)

18 August 1999
13:00

Belarus	1 – 0	Switzerland
Aharodnik 46'	Report

City Stadium, Borisov
Referee: Attila Hanacsek (Hungary)

3 September 1999
16:00

Belarus	1 – 0	Wales
Lanko 90'	Report

City Stadium, Borisov
Referee: Marco Tura (San Marino)
3 September 1999
19:30

Denmark	1 – 3	Switzerland
Petersen 89'	Report	Cabanas 7'; H.Yakin 18'; Thurre 83'

Odense Stadion, Odense
Referee: Erol Ersoy (Turkey)

7 September 1999
19:00

Switzerland	2 – 1	Belarus
Thurre 17'; Seoane 63'	Report	Razumaw 44'

Colovray Sports Centre, Nyon
Referee: Florin Chivulete (Romania)
8 September 1999
16:00

Italy	3 – 1	Denmark
Coco 3'; Ventola 77'; Petersen 88' (o.g.)	Report	Smith 66'

Stadio Simonetta Lamberti, Cava de' Tirreni
Referee: José Joâo Mendes Pratas (Portugal)

8 October 1999
14:00

Belarus	1 – 2	Italy
Razumaw 40'	Report	Spinesi 30'; Margiotta 90'

City Stadium, Borisov
Referee: Wolfgang Sowa (Austria)
8 October 1999
20:30

Wales	0 – 0	Switzerland
	Report

Latham Park, Newtown
Referee: Valeriy Onufer (Ukraine)

== Goalscorers ==
- TBD
