= 2000 UEFA European Under-21 Championship qualification Group 8 =

Football tournament qualification stage

The teams competing in Group 8 of the 2000 UEFA European Under-21 Championship qualifying competition were Croatia, Republic of Ireland, Yugoslavia, Macedonia and Malta.

== Standings ==
Team	Pld	W	D	L	GF	GA	GD	Pts
Croatia	8	6	2	0	25	7	+18	20
FR Yugoslavia	8	5	2	1	29	10	+19	17
Republic of Ireland	8	4	2	2	13	12	+1	14
Malta	8	1	0	7	8	23	−15	3
Macedonia	8	1	0	7	2	25	−23	3

	(Croatia)	(Republic of Ireland)	(North Macedonia)	(Malta)	(Federal Republic of Yugoslavia)
Croatia	—	5–1	4–0	1–0	2–2
Republic of Ireland	2–2	—	3–0^{*}	2–1	0–2
Macedonia	0–2	0–1	—	1–0	0–8
Malta	0–3	1–3	5–1	—	1–5
FR Yugoslavia	2–6	1–1	2–0	7–0	—

^{*} Match originally ended as a 0–0 draw, but UEFA later awarded the match as a 3–0 forfeit win to Republic of Ireland due to Macedonia including ineligible players in their squad.

== Matches ==
All times are CET.

4 September 1998
20:30

Republic of Ireland	2 – 2	Croatia
Conlon 2'; Baker 62'	Report	Šokota 60', 81'

Buckley Park, Kilkenny
Referee: Pascal Garibian (France)
6 September 1998
15:00

Macedonia	1 – 0	Malta
Ignatov 47' (pen.)	Report

Stadion Sileks, Kratovo
Referee: Carlo Bertolini (Switzerland)

9 October 1998
19:00

Malta	0 – 3	Croatia
	Report	Leko 48'; Bišćan 62'; Deranja 85'

Ta' Qali National Stadium, Ta' Qali
Referee: Muhittin Bosat (Turkey)

13 October 1998
15:30

Republic of Ireland	2 – 1	Malta
Clare 31'; Worrell 90'	Report	Licari 27'

Bridgewater Centre Park, Arklow
Referee: Ladislav Gádoši (Slovakia)
14 October 1998
15:00

Croatia	4 – 0	Macedonia
Pilipović 59'; Šokota 66', 87'; Leko 69'	Report

Gradski stadion, Sisak
Referee: Florin Chivulete (Romania)

17 November 1998
14:30

Malta	5 – 1	Macedonia
Mallia 13', 36'; Zahra 61'; M. Galea 69'; Grima 83'	Report	Dimitrovski 73'

Victor Tedesco Stadium, Ħamrun
Referee: Michal Beneš (Czech Republic)
18 November 1998
13:30

FR Yugoslavia	1 – 1	Republic of Ireland
Ivić 8'	Report	Kilbane 90'

Fortress Stadium, Smederevo
Referee: Luc Huyghe (Belgium)

9 February 1999
15:00

Malta	1 – 5	FR Yugoslavia
Zahra 9'	Report	Drulić 21', 57', 90'; Camenzuli 53' (o.g.); Pantelić 67'

Gozo Stadium, Gozo
Referee: Gary Stephen Willard (England)

5 June 1999
14:00

Macedonia	0 – 2	Croatia
	Report	Smoje 37'; Leko 56'

Stadion Sileks, Kratovo
Referee: Wolfgang Sowa (Austria)

8 June 1999
15:45

FR Yugoslavia	7 – 0	Malta
Đokaj 12'; Paunović 22'; Kežman 39'; Drulić 41', 82'; Vukomanović 49'; Pantelić 72'	Report

Kalochori Stadium, Thessaloniki (Greece)
Referee: Algirdas Dubinskas (Lithuania)
9 June 1999
20:30

Republic of Ireland	3 – 0 (awarded)	Macedonia
	Report

Terryland Park, Galway
Referee: Sergejs Braga (Latvia)

Originally ended 0–0. Later awarded as 3–0 win for Republic of Ireland due to Macedonia fielding a suspended player.

17 August 1999
20:00

FR Yugoslavia	2 – 6	Croatia
Ivić 33'; Ilić 50'	Report	Šerić 6'; Mikić 49', 90'; Deranja 65'; Šokota 68', 85'

Partizan Stadium, Belgrade
Referee: Livio Bazzoli (Italy)

21 August 1999
17:00

Croatia	1 – 0	Malta
Pilipović 24'	Report

Stadion Kranjčevićeva, Zagreb
Referee: Jan Hald (Denmark)

31 August 1999
20:30

Republic of Ireland	0 – 2	FR Yugoslavia
	Report	Đokaj 55', 81'

Tolka Park, Dublin
Referee: Vasyl Melnychuk (Ukraine)

3 September 1999
17:00

Croatia	5 – 1	Republic of Ireland
Pilipović 12'; Šokota 22'; Mikić 24'; Balaban 88', 90'	Report	Hawkins 41'

Stadion Kranjčevićeva, Zagreb
Referee: Leif Sundell (Sweden)
4 September 1999
16:30

FR Yugoslavia	2 – 0	Macedonia
Jelić 29', 36'	Report

FK Obilić Stadium, Belgrade
Referee: Yuri Baskakov (Russia)

7 September 1999
16:00

Macedonia	0 – 8	FR Yugoslavia
	Report	Lazetić 7', 57'; Kežman 31', 33', 66'; Tanasijević 55'; Jelić 69', 85'

Gjorče Petrov Stadium, Skopje
Referee: Paulo Paraty (Portugal)
7 September 1999
18:00

Malta	1 – 3	Republic of Ireland
Mamo 88'	Report	Lee 37'; Mahon 71'; Fenn 86'

Ta' Qali National Stadium, Ta' Qali
Referee: Anton Getzov (Bulgaria)

8 October 1999
14:00

Macedonia	0 – 1	Republic of Ireland
	Report	Rowlands 33'

SRC Biljanini Izvori, Ohrid
Referee: Tom Henning Øvrebø (Norway)
8 October 1999
16:00

Croatia	2 – 2	FR Yugoslavia
Šokota 46'; Vranješ 52'	Report	Bošković 44'; Francišković 75'

Stadion Kranjčevićeva, Zagreb
Referee: Domenico Messina (Italy)

== Goalscorers ==
8 goals

- (Croatia) Tomo Šokota

5 goals

- (Federal Republic of Yugoslavia) Goran Drulić

4 goals

- (Federal Republic of Yugoslavia) Branko Jelić
- (Federal Republic of Yugoslavia) Mateja Kežman

3 goals

- (Croatia) Ivan Leko
- (Croatia) Mihael Mikić
- (Croatia) Renato Pilipović
- (Federal Republic of Yugoslavia) Ardian Đokaj

2 goals

- (Croatia) Boško Balaban
- (Croatia) Zvonimir Deranja
- (Malta) George Mallia
- (Malta) Antoine Zahra
- (Federal Republic of Yugoslavia) Vladimir Ivić
- (Federal Republic of Yugoslavia) Nikola Lazetić
- (Federal Republic of Yugoslavia) Marko Pantelić

1 goal

- (Croatia) Igor Bišćan
- (Croatia) Anthony Šerić
- (Croatia) Dario Smoje
- (Croatia) Jurica Vranješ
- (Republic of Ireland) Stephen Baker
- (Republic of Ireland) Barry Conlon
- (Republic of Ireland) Daryl Clare
- (Republic of Ireland) Neale Fenn
- (Republic of Ireland) Colin Hawkins
- (Republic of Ireland) Kevin Kilbane
- (Republic of Ireland) Alan Lee
- (Republic of Ireland) Alan Mahon
- (Republic of Ireland) Martin Rowlands
- (Republic of Ireland) David Worrell
- (North Macedonia) Dejan Dimitrovski
- (North Macedonia) Stojan Ignatov
- (Malta) Michael Galea
- (Malta) Massimo Grima
- (Malta) Malcolm Licari
- (Malta) Carlo Mamo
- (Federal Republic of Yugoslavia) Branko Bošković
- (Federal Republic of Yugoslavia) Ivica Francišković
- (Federal Republic of Yugoslavia) Saša Ilić
- (Federal Republic of Yugoslavia) Veljko Paunović
- (Federal Republic of Yugoslavia) Jovan Tanasijević
- (Federal Republic of Yugoslavia) Ivan Vukomanović

1 own goal

- (Malta) William Camenzuli (playing against Yugoslavia)
