= Štadión Sihoť =

Football stadium in Trenčín, Slovakia

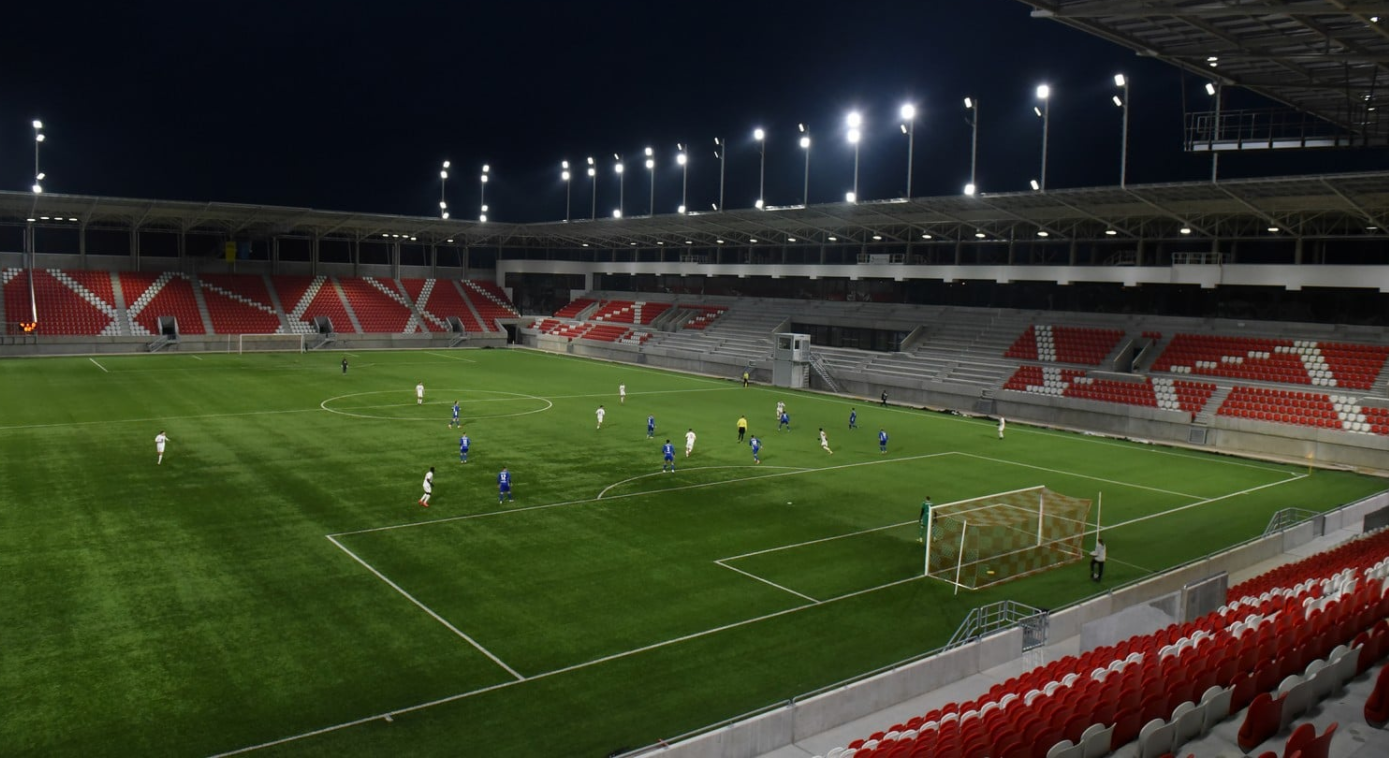
- UEFA
- Interactive map of Štadión Sihoť
- Former names: Štadión na Sihoti (1960–2021); Štadión Sihoť (2021–)
- Location: Mládežnícka 2313, Trenčín, Slovakia
- Coordinates: 48.89868°N 18.044738°E
- Operator: AS Trenčín
- Capacity: 6,366
- Surface: Artificial grass
- Field size: 105 x 68 m

Construction
- Built: 1960
- Renovated: 2014–2021
- Cost: €20 million (2014–2021)

Tenants
- AS Trenčín (1960–present); UEFA U-21 Championship (2025)

Website
- www.astrencin.sk

Štadión na Sihoti is a multi-use stadium in Trenčín, Slovakia. It is currently used mostly for football matches and is the home ground of AS Trenčín. The stadium holds 6,366 people. The ground was built in 1960 and has since undergone several renovations.

== History ==
The stadium was built in the 1960s and used for football matches of AS Trenčín sport club. The original capacity was over 22,000, mostly for standing spectators. Due to disrepair, the capacity was decreased to 16,000 then to 4,500 in 2008. Renovations began in 2014 to increase the capacity to 10,000.

== New arena ==
Between 2017 and 2021, the stadium was replaced by a new modern all-seater arena with a capacity of around 11,500 spectators.

In 2015, the old stands (except the main stand) were demolished. By December 2020, three sides of the stadium had been built. In February 2021 the stadium was opened after reconstruction. By September 2024, after over 19 years of using artificial turf, natural grass had returned to the stadium.

== Image gallery ==
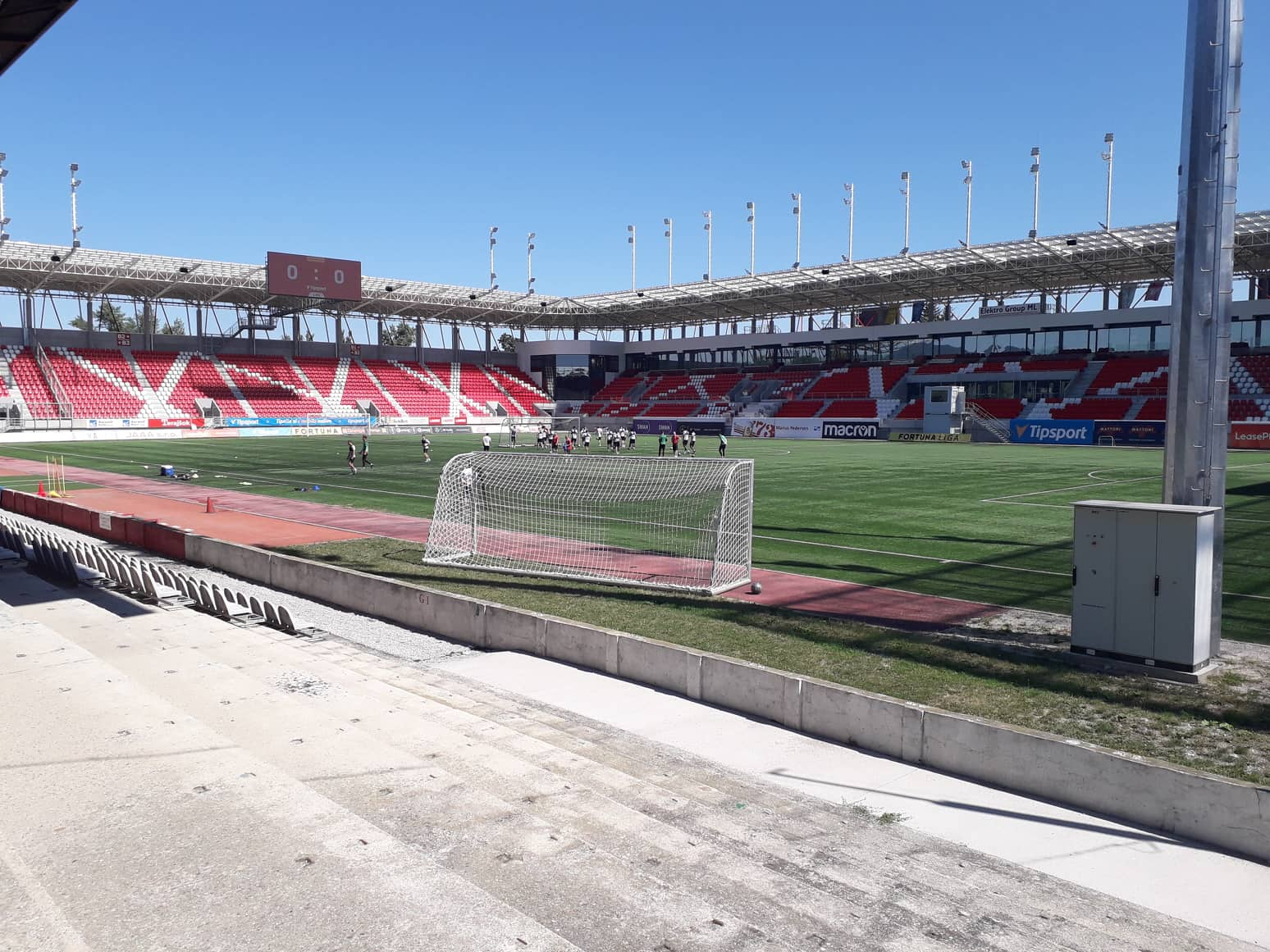

== UEFA U-21 Championship 2000 ==
Štadíón na Sihoti has hosted three matches of UEFA U-21 Championship 2000

27 May 2000
19:00

Spain	1–1	Czech Republic
Luque 90'	Report	L. Došek 55'

Štadión na Sihoti, Trenčín
Referee: Leslie Irvine (Northern Ireland)
29 May 2000
19:00

Czech Republic	3–1	Netherlands
Jankulovski 28'; Jarolím 54', 82'	Report	Lurling 18'

Štadión na Sihoti, Trenčín
Referee: Selearajen Subramaniam (Malaysia)
1 June 2000
20:30

Czech Republic	4–3	Croatia
L. Došek 44' (pen.); Baroš 54'; Petrouš 61' (pen.); Sionko 80'	Report	Šerić 4'; Tudor 57', 85'

Štadión na Sihoti, Trenčín
Referee: Karl-Erik Nilsson (Sweden)

== International matches ==
Štadión na Sihoti has hosted one competitive match of the Slovakia national football team.

5 September 2001 2002 FIFA World Cup; Qualifying Group 4	Slovakia	4–2	Moldova	Trenčín, Slovakia
19:45; Match 88	Peter Németh 54'; Szilárd Németh 59'; Igor Demo 64', 70'		Serghei Cleşcenco 11'; Radu Rebeja 76'	Stadium: Štadión na Sihoti; Attendance: 3,000; Referee: Mikko Vuorela (Finland)
