= 2000 UEFA European Under-21 Championship qualification play-offs =

The play-off first legs were played on 12–14 November 1999, while the second legs were played on 16–17 November 1999 and 29 March 2000. Winners of play-off round qualified to the championship played following year in May and June, where Slovakia was chosen to host the fixtures.

== Matches ==
Team 1	Agg.	Team 2	1st leg	2nd leg
Portugal	2–3	Croatia	2–0	0–3 (aet)
Norway	1–7	Spain	1–3	0–4
Czech Republic	3–1	Greece	3–0	0–1
England	3–0	FR Yugoslavia	3–0	—
Poland	2–2 (a)	Turkey	2–1	0–1
Russia	1–4	Slovakia	0–1	1–3
Netherlands	4–2	Belgium	2–2	2–0
France	2–3	Italy	1–1	1–2 (aet)

== First leg ==
12 November 1999
20:15

Poland	2 – 1	Turkey
Wichniarek 32'; Głowacki 75'	Report	Albayrak 81'

Stadion Amica, Wronki
Referee: Arturo Daudén Ibáñez (Spain)

13 November 1999
13:00

Norway	1 – 3	Spain
Carew 44'	Report	Xavi 58'; Farinós 78'; Gerard 82'

Nadderud Stadion, Bærum
Referee: Roelof Luinge (Netherlands)

13 November 1999
14:00

Russia	0 – 1	Slovakia
	Report	Czinege 66'

Central Dynamo Stadium, Moscow
Referee: Konrad Plautz (Austria)

13 November 1999
17:00

Czech Republic	3 – 0	Greece
Sionko 45', 71'; Baroš 82'	Report

Na Stínadlech, Teplice
Referee: Alain Hamer (Luxembourg)

13 November 1999
18:00

Netherlands	2 – 2	Belgium
Knopper 38'; Bouma 77'	Report	Roussel 61'; Van Handenhoven 64'

Abe Lenstra Stadion, Heerenveen
Referee: Atanas Uzunov (Bulgaria)

13 November 1999
19:45

Portugal	2 – 0	Croatia
Boa Morte 35', 81'	Report

Estádio de São Luís, Faro
Referee: Terje Hauge (Norway)

14 November 1999
20:45

France	1 – 1	Italy
Malouida 61'	Report	Ventola 49'

Stade Dominique Duvauchelle, Créteil
Referee: Rune Pedersen (Norway)

== Second leg ==
16 November 1999
19:00

Turkey	1 – 0	Poland
Dursun 15'	Report

İzmir Alsancak Stadium, İzmir
Referee: Amand Ancion (Belgium)

2–2 on aggregate, Turkey won on away goals rule.

16 November 1999
20:00

Spain	4 – 0	Norway
Tamudo 6'; Gerard 43'; Luque 73'; Ferrón 78'	Report

El Sardinero, Santander
Referee: Georgios Bikas (Greece)

Spain won 7–1 on aggregate

17 November 1999
13:30

Slovakia	3 – 1	Russia
Barčík 48'; Németh 62'; Vyskoč 74'	Report	Savelyev 88'

Stadium ŠKP Devín, Bratislava
Referee: Stéphane Bre (France)

Slovakia won 4–1 on aggregate

17 November 1999
17:00

Croatia	3 – 0 (a.e.t.)	Portugal
J. Šimić 38'; Deranja 40'; Balaban 99'	Report

Stadion Poljud, Split
Referee: Oguz Sarvan (Turkey)

Croatia won 3–2 on aggregate

17 November 1999
17:00

Greece	1 – 0	Czech Republic
Konstantinidis 27'	Report

Theodoros Vardinogiannis Stadium, Heraklion
Referee: Alfredo Trentalange (Italy)

Czech Republic won 3–1 on aggregate

17 November 1999
19:00

Belgium	0 – 2	Netherlands
	Report	Cairo 28'; Bruggink 45'

Stade Le Canonnier, Mouscron
Referee: Leslie Irvine (Northern Ireland)

Netherlands won 4–2 on aggregate

17 November 1999
20:45

Italy	2 – 1 (a.e.t.)	France
Comandini 59'; Pirlo 110'	Report	Henry 1'

Stadio Erasmo Iacovone, Taranto
Referee: Lucilio Cardoso Cortez Batista (Portugal)

Italy won 3–2 on aggregate

29 March 2000
19:00

England	3 – 0	FR Yugoslavia
Campbell 24'; Lampard 49'; Hendrie 64'	Report

Mini Estadi, Barcelona (Spain)
Referee: Hartmut Strampe (Germany)

The match was played as a single leg at neutral venue due to the political tensions in Yugoslavia.
