= Jakob Bresemann =

Danish footballer (born 1976)

Personal information
- Date of birth: 22 October 1976 (age 50)
- Place of birth: Denmark
- Height: 1.89 m (6 ft 2 in)
- Position: Defender

Youth career
- SB 50 Ishøj

Senior career*
| Years | Team | Apps | (Gls) |
| 1996–2002 | Hvidovre IF | | |
| 2002–2003 | BK Skjold | | |
| 2003–2005 | Herfølge BK | 61 | (0) |
| 2005–2006 | Vejle BK | | |
| 2007–2012 | Lyngby BK | 78 | |
| 2012–? | Hellerup IK | | |
- * Club domestic league appearances and goals

Jakob Bresemann (born 22 October 1976) is a Danish former professional football central defender.

In 2007 he went from Vejle BK to Lyngby BK. He was the vice-captain of Lyngby BK, behind Morten Petersen.

He announced his retirement from Lyngby in December 2011, but appeared for Second Division club Hellerup IK in 2012.

After retiring he worked with shipping, in Dampskibsselskabet Torm.
