= Kartika Luyet =

Brazilian-born model and television personality

- Born: 5 March 1977 (age 48); Rio de Janeiro, Brazil
- Occupation(s): Model, television personality
- Spouse: Nicola Ventola

Kartika Luyet (born 5 March 1977), also known simply as Kartika, is a Brazilian model and television personality. Raised in Switzerland, she rose to prominence in Italy after filming commercials for Fiat in 2000 and 2001. Since 2015, she has been based in Dubai.

== Early life ==
Luyet was born in Rio de Janeiro, Brazil to a Swiss father and Indonesian mother. She spent most of her childhood in Savièse, a municipality of the canton of Valais, Switzerland.

== Career ==
Luyet became first known in Italy thanks to two Fiat commercials, broadcast in 2000 and 2001. In 2001 she debuted on television alongside Rosario Fiorello in the RAI variety television Stasera pago io.

In 2004, she was spokesmodel of the lingerie company Miss Bikini, starring in an advertising campaign that raised some controversy because of being considered vulgar and offensive. In 2008, she starred in the music video for the song "Una cosa sola" of the rock group Magenta. In 2012 she created her own line of nail polish.

== Personal life ==
Luyet is married to Italian former footballer Nicola Ventola; together they have a son named Kelian, born on 22 September 2003.

In 2015, Luyet and her husband moved to Dubai, after Ventola was offered a job with a television channel there.
