= 2000 UEFA European Under-21 Championship =

Majstrovstvá Európy vo futbale hráčov do 21 rokov 2000

Tournament details
- Host country: Slovakia
- Dates: 27 May – 4 June
- Teams: 8 (finals); 47 (qualifying)
- Venue: 4 (in 3 host cities)

Final positions
- Champions: Italy (4th title)
- Runners-up: Czech Republic
- Third place: Spain
- Fourth place: Slovakia

Tournament statistics
- Matches played: 14
- Goals scored: 40 (2.86 per match)
- Attendance: 74,930 (5,352 per match)
- Top scorer: (Italy) Andrea Pirlo (3 goals)
- Best player: (Italy) Andrea Pirlo

The 2000 UEFA European Under-21 Championship was the 12th staging of UEFA's European Under-21 Championship. The final tournament was hosted by Slovakia from 27 May to 4 June 2000. The tournament had 47 entrants. Northern Ireland competed for the first time. For the first time a finals tournament with two groups of four teams was held, with one of those teams, Slovakia, having been chosen as the hosts. The top four teams in this competition qualified for the 2000 Summer Olympics.

Italy won the competition for the fourth time, thus qualified for the Olympic Games finals, alongside Czech Republic, Slovakia and Spain.

== Qualification ==
The 47 national teams were divided into nine groups (seven groups of 5 + two groups of 6). The records of the nine group runners-up were then compared. The top seven joined the nine winners in a play-off for the eight finals spots. One of the eight qualifiers was then chosen to host the remaining fixtures.

=== Qualified teams ===
Country	Qualified as	Date qualification was secured	Previous appearances in tournament^{1, 2}
Italy	Group 1 and play-off winner	17 November 1999	10 (1978, 1980, 1982, 1984, 1986, 1988, 1990, **1992**, **1994**, **1996**)
Turkey	Group 3 and play-off winner	16 November 1999	0 (debut)
England^{3}	Group 5 and play-off winner	29 March 2000	6 (1978, 1980, **1982**, **1984**, 1986, 1988)
Spain	Group 6 and play-off winner	16 November 1999	10 (1978, 1980, 1982, 1984, **1986**, 1988, 1990, 1994, 1996, **1998**)
Netherlands	Group 6 runners-up and play-off winner	17 November 1999	3 (1988, 1992, 1998)
Slovakia (hosts)	Group 7 and play-off winner	17 November 1999	0 (debut) (7 including Czechoslovakia)
Croatia	Group 8 and play-off winner	17 November 1999	0 (debut)
Czech Republic	Group 9 runners-up and play-off winner	17 November 1999	1 (1996)

^{1} Bold indicates champion for that year
^{2} Italic indicates host for that year
^{3} England were originally scheduled to play two legs against Yugoslavia. However, the first leg which was supposed to have taken place in Belgrade was cancelled due to political tensions. An alternative leg in Luxembourg was also cancelled due to security reasons. A second leg at Mini Estadi in Barcelona was held on 29 March 2000, which England won 3–0.

== Venues ==
Four venues were selected for the competition.

Bratislava	Trenčín	Trnava	Bratislava
Tehelné pole	Štadión na Sihoti	Štadión Antona Malatinského	Štadión Pasienky
48°09′48.81″N 17°08′12.68″E	48°53′55.25″N 18°02′41.06″E	48°22′24″N 17°35′30″E	48°09′58.24″N 17°08′33.01″E
Capacity: 30,087	Capacity: 22,079	Capacity: 18,500	Capacity: 8,632
2000 UEFA European Under-21 Championship (Slovakia)

== Match officials ==
Seven match officials and nine assistants were selected for the competition, including two officials representing the Asian Football Confederation (AFC), Selearajen Subramaniam from Malaysia and Hamdi Al Kadri from Syria.

Country	Referee	Assistants		Fourth officials	Matches refereed
France	Stéphane Bré	Egon Bereuter (Austria)	Vincent Texier (France)	Vladimír Hriňák (Slovakia); Leslie Irvine (Northern Ireland)	Croatia 1–2 Netherlands; England 6–0 Turkey
Germany	Herbert Fandel	Harald Sather (Germany)	Kostantin Piskov (Bulgaria); Egon Bereuter (Austria)	Selearajen Subramaniam (Malaysia); Stéphane Bré (France)	Czech Republic 3–1 Netherlands; England 0–2 Slovakia
Malaysia	Selearajen Subramaniam	Kostantin Piskov (Bulgaria)	Hamdi Al Kadri (Syria)	Vladimír Hriňák (Slovakia)	Czech Republic 3–1 Netherlands
Northern Ireland	Leslie Irvine	John McElhinney (Scotland); Egon Bereuter (Austria)	Mikhail Semionov (Russia); Hamdi Al Kadri (Syria)	Valentin Ivanov (Russia); Selearajen Subramaniam (Malaysia)	Spain 1–1 Czech Republic; Spain 1–0 Slovakia
Russia	Valentin Ivanov	Mikhail Semionov (Russia); Kostantin Piskov (Bulgaria)	Maciej Wierzbowski (Poland); Mikhail Semionov (Russia)	Karl-Erik Nilsson (Sweden); Selearajen Subramaniam (Malaysia)	Spain 0–0 Croatia; Turkey 1–3 Italy
Sweden	Karl-Erik Nilsson	Maciej Wierzbowski (Poland)	Hamdi Al Kadri (Syria); Ferenc Székely (Hungary); Kostantin Piskov (Bulgaria)	Leslie Irvine (Northern Ireland); Dieter Schoch (Switzerland)	Czech Republic 4–3 Croatia; Slovakia 2–1 Turkey; Czech Republic 1–2 Italy
Switzerland	Dieter Schoch	Ferenc Székely (Hungary)	John McElhinney (Scotland)	Vladimír Hriňák (Slovakia); Herbert Fandel (Germany)	Netherlands 0–1 Spain; Italy 1–1 Slovakia

== Matches ==
=== Group stage ===
==== Group A ====
Team	Pld	W	D	L	GF	GA	GD	Pts
Czech Republic	3	2	1	0	8	5	+3	7
Spain	3	1	2	0	2	1	+1	5
Netherlands	3	1	0	2	3	5	−2	3
Croatia	3	0	1	2	4	6	−2	1

27 May 2000
19:00

Spain	1–1	Czech Republic
Luque 90'	Report	L. Došek 55'

Štadión na Sihoti, Trenčín
Attendance: 8,281
Referee: Leslie Irvine (Northern Ireland)
27 May 2000
18:00

Croatia	1–2	Netherlands
Miladin 20'	Report	Van Bommel 42'; Vennegoor of Hesselink 84'

Štadión Antona Malatinského, Trnava
Attendance: 959
Referee: Stéphane Bré (France)

29 May 2000
20:30

Spain	0–0	Croatia
	Report

Štadión Antona Malatinského, Trnava
Attendance: 843
Referee: Valentin Ivanov (Russia)
29 May 2000
19:00

Czech Republic	3–1	Netherlands
Jankulovski 28'; Jarolím 54', 82'	Report	Lurling 18'

Štadión na Sihoti, Trenčín
Attendance: 8,281
Referee: Selearajen Subramaniam (Malaysia)

1 June 2000
20:30

Netherlands	0–1	Spain
	Report	Angulo 6'

Štadión Antona Malatinského, Trnava
Attendance: 792
Referee: Dieter Schoch (Switzerland)
1 June 2000
20:30

Czech Republic	4–3	Croatia
L. Došek 44' (pen.); Baroš 54'; Petrouš 61' (pen.); Sionko 80'	Report	Šerić 4'; Tudor 57', 85'

Štadión na Sihoti, Trenčín
Attendance: 8,188
Referee: Karl-Erik Nilsson (Sweden)

==== Group B ====
Team	Pld	W	D	L	GF	GA	GD	Pts
Italy	3	2	1	0	6	2	+4	7
Slovakia	3	2	1	0	5	2	+3	7
England	3	1	0	2	6	4	+2	3
Turkey	3	0	0	3	2	11	−9	0

27 May 2000
20:30

Italy	2–0	England
Comandini 24'; Pirlo 45' (pen.)	Report

Tehelné pole, Bratislava
Attendance: 3,522
Referee: Herbert Fandel (Germany)
27 May 2000
18:00

Slovakia	2–1	Turkey
Greško 6'; Čišovský 67'	Report	Dursun 63'

Štadión Pasienky, Bratislava
Attendance: 6,000
Referee: Karl-Erik Nilsson (Sweden)

29 May 2000
20:30

Italy	1–1	Slovakia
Baronio 17'	Report	Babnič 73'

Štadión Pasienky, Bratislava
Attendance: 7,450
Referee: Dieter Schoch (Switzerland)
29 May 2000
20:30

England	6–0	Turkey
Lampard 28'; Jeffers 45'; Cort 66'; King 73'; Mills 77'; Campbell 90'	Report

Tehelné pole, Bratislava
Attendance: 550
Referee: Stéphane Bré (France)

1 June 2000
20:30

Turkey	1–3	Italy
S. Akın 54'	Report	Spinesi 14'; Baronio 36' (pen.); Ventola 83'

Tehelné pole, Bratislava
Attendance: 374
Referee: Valentin Ivanov (Russia)
1 June 2000
20:30

England	0–2	Slovakia
	Report	Babnič 67'; Németh 74'

Štadión Pasienky, Bratislava
Attendance: 11,400
Referee: Herbert Fandel (Germany)

=== Third place play-off ===
4 June 2000
17:00

Spain	1–0	Slovakia
Ferrón 58'	Report

Štadión Pasienky, Bratislava
Attendance: 9,120
Referee: Leslie Irvine (Northern Ireland)

=== Final ===
4 June 2000
20:30

Czech Republic	1–2	Italy
T. Došek 51'	Report	Pirlo 42' (pen.), 81'

Tehelné pole, Bratislava
Attendance: 9,170
Referee: Karl-Erik Nilsson (Sweden)

== Goalscorers ==
Andrea Pirlo was the top goalscorer of three goals. He was also announced as the UEFA Golden Player award recipient.

3 goals

- (Italy) Andrea Pirlo

2 goals

- (Croatia) Igor Tudor
- (Czech Republic) Lukáš Došek
- (Czech Republic) David Jarolím
- (Italy) Roberto Baronio
- (Slovakia) Peter Babnič

1 goal

- (Croatia) Darko Miladin
- (Croatia) Anthony Šerić
- (Czech Republic) Milan Baroš
- (Czech Republic) Tomáš Došek
- (Czech Republic) Marek Jankulovski
- (Czech Republic) Adam Petrouš
- (Czech Republic) Libor Sionko
- (England) Andy Campbell
- (England) Carl Cort
- (England) Francis Jeffers
- (England) Ledley King
- (England) Frank Lampard
- (England) Danny Mills
- (Italy) Gianni Comandini
- (Italy) Gionatha Spinesi
- (Italy) Nicola Ventola
- (Netherlands) Anthony Lurling
- (Netherlands) Mark van Bommel
- (Netherlands) Jan Vennegoor of Hesselink
- (Spain) Miguel Ángel Angulo
- (Spain) Jordi Ferrón
- (Spain) Albert Luque
- (Slovakia) Marián Čišovský
- (Slovakia) Vratislav Greško
- (Slovakia) Szilárd Németh
- (Turkey) Serhat Akın
- (Turkey) Ahmet Dursun

== Medal table and Olympic qualifiers ==
- Italy, Czechia, Spain and Slovakia qualified for Olympic Games finals.

Pos	Team	Pld	W	D	L	GF	GA	GD	Pts	Final result
1st place, gold medalist(s)	Italy	4	3	1	0	8	3	+5	10	Gold medal
2nd place, silver medalist(s)	Czech Republic	4	2	1	1	9	7	+2	7	Silver medal
3rd place, bronze medalist(s)	Spain	4	2	2	0	3	1	+2	8	Bronze medal
4	Slovakia (H)	4	2	1	1	5	3	+2	7	Fourth place
5	England	3	1	0	2	6	4	+2	3	Eliminated in group stage
6	Netherlands	3	1	0	2	3	5	−2	3	Eliminated in group stage
7	Croatia	3	0	1	2	4	6	−2	1	Eliminated in group stage
8	Turkey	3	0	0	3	2	11	−9	0	Eliminated in group stage

Source: [ ]
(H) Hosts
