= Antoine Zahra (footballer, born 1981) =

Maltese footballer

Personal information
- Date of birth: 9 January 1981 (age 45)
- Place of birth: Żejtun, Malta
- Position: Striker

Youth career
- –1996: Floriana

Senior career*
Years	Team	Apps	(Gls)
1997–2001	Floriana	51	(4)
2001–2006	Hibernians	103	(12)
2007–2011	St. George's	0	(0)
2011–	Zejtun	1	(0)

International career^{‡}
- Malta U16
- Malta U18
- Malta U21
2003–	Malta	6	(1)
- * Club domestic league appearances and goals as of 13 February 2010 ‡ National team caps and goals as of 13 February 2010

Antoine Zahra (born 9 January 1981, Żejtun, Malta) is a professional footballer who currently plays for Maltese First Division side Zejtun Corinthians F.C., where he plays as a striker. He is not to be confused with his namesake and co-national, an older Antoine Zahra, also a Maltese footballer.

== International goal ==
Scores and results list Malta's goal tally first.

No	Date	Venue	Opponent	Score	Result	Competition
1.	16 February 2004	National Stadium, Ta' Qali, Malta	Estonia	5–2	5–2	Malta International Tournament
