= 2000 UEFA European Under-21 Championship qualification =

The 2000 UEFA European Under-21 Championship qualification began in 1998. The final tournament was held in 2000 in Slovakia.

The 47 national teams were divided into nine groups (seven groups of 5 + two groups of 6). The records of the nine group runners-up were then compared. The top seven joined the nine winners in a play-off for the eight finals spots. One of the eight qualifiers was then chosen to host the remaining fixtures.

== Qualifying group stage ==
=== Draw ===
The allocation of teams into qualifying groups was based on that of UEFA Euro 2000 qualifying tournament with several changes, reflecting the absence of some nations:

- Groups 1, 2, 3, 5, 8, featured the same nations
- Group 4 did not include Andorra
- Group 6 did not include San Marino, but included Netherlands (who did not participate in senior Euro qualification)
- Group 7 did not include Liechtenstein
- Group 9 did not include Faroe Islands, but included Belgium (who did not participate in senior Euro qualification)

=== Group 1 ===
Team	Pld	W	D	L	GF	GA	GD	Pts
Italy	8	7	1	0	20	7	+13	22
Switzerland	8	4	2	2	8	4	+4	14
Denmark	8	3	1	4	11	13	−2	10
Belarus	8	2	1	5	5	12	−7	7
Wales	8	0	3	5	6	14	−8	3

	(Belarus)	(Denmark)	(Italy)	(Switzerland)	(Wales)
Belarus	—	0–2	1–2	1–0	1–0
Denmark	2–0	—	1–2	1–3	2–2
Italy	4–1	3–1	—	1–0	6–2
Switzerland	2–1	2–0	0–0	—	1–0
Wales	0–0	1–2	1–2	0–0	—

Italy qualified as group winners
Switzerland failed to qualify as one of the best runners-up

=== Group 2 ===
Team	Pld	W	D	L	GF	GA	GD	Pts
Greece	10	7	2	1	32	10	+22	23
Norway	10	7	1	2	21	8	+13	22
Georgia	10	2	5	3	11	13	−2	11
Latvia	10	2	3	5	8	19	−11	9
Slovenia	10	1	5	4	10	19	−9	8
Albania	10	1	4	5	8	21	−13	7

- Georgia 0–1 Albania
- Norway 2–0 Latvia
- Greece 2–2 Slovenia
- Latvia 1–2 Georgia
- Slovenia 1–3 Norway
- Greece 3–2 Georgia
- Norway 4–1 Albania
- Slovenia 0–1 Latvia
- Albania 0–5 Greece
- Greece 2–1 Norway
- Georgia 0–0 Slovenia
- Latvia 0–2 Greece
- Latvia 0–0 Albania
- Georgia 0–3 Norway
- Norway 0–0 Georgia
- Albania 1–2 Norway
- Georgia 1–1 Greece
- Latvia 1–1 Slovenia
- Greece 6–0 Latvia
- Albania 1–1 Slovenia
- Slovenia 3–1 Albania
- Norway 2–1 Greece
- Albania 1–1 Latvia
- Slovenia 2–2 Georgia
- Georgia 4–2 Latvia
- Norway 3–0 Slovenia
- Greece 5–2 Albania
- Albania 0–0 Georgia
- Latvia 2–1 Norway
- Slovenia 0–5 Greece

Greece qualified as group winners
Norway qualified as one of the best runners-up

=== Group 3 ===
Team	Pld	W	D	L	GF	GA	GD	Pts
Turkey	8	4	4	0	11	4	+7	16
Germany	8	4	1	3	9	7	+2	13
Finland	8	3	4	1	9	7	+2	13
Northern Ireland	8	1	3	4	5	9	−4	6
Moldova	8	0	4	4	3	10	−7	4

- Finland 1–0 Moldova
- Turkey 2–0 N. Ireland
- Turkey 2–0 Germany
- N. Ireland 1–1 Finland
- Moldova 0–2 Germany
- Turkey 1–1 Finland
- N. Ireland 1–1 Moldova
- N. Ireland 1–0 Germany
- Turkey 2–0 Moldova
- Germany 2–0 Finland
- Moldova 0–0 N. Ireland
- Germany 2–0 Moldova
- Finland 0–0 Turkey
- Moldova 1–1 Finland
- Finland 3–1 Germany
- N. Ireland 1–2 Turkey
- Germany 1–0 N. Ireland
- Moldova 1–1 Turkey
- Finland 2–1 N. Ireland
- Germany 1–1 Turkey

Turkey qualified as group winners
Germany failed to qualify as one of the best runners-up
Germany (13 pts) and Finland (13 pts) head-to-head record:
2–0 in Germany, 3–1 in Finland. Germany is ranked higher on away goals rule.

=== Group 4 ===
Team	Pld	W	D	L	GF	GA	GD	Pts
France	8	6	1	1	18	4	+14	19
Russia	8	6	0	2	17	5	+12	18
Ukraine	8	3	2	3	16	12	+4	11
Iceland	8	2	0	6	9	18	−9	6
Armenia	8	1	1	6	6	27	−21	4

	(France)	(Russia)	(Ukraine)	(Iceland)	(Armenia)
France	—	2–0	4–0	2–0	3–1
Russia	2–1	—	2–0	3–0	6–0
Ukraine	0–0	1–0	—	5–1	8–0
Iceland	0–2	1–2	4–1	—	2–0
Armenia	1–4	0–2	1–1	3–1	—

France qualified as group winners
Russia qualified as one of the best runners-up

=== Group 5 ===
Team	Pld	W	D	L	GF	GA	GD	Pts
England	8	7	0	1	23	3	+20	21
Poland	8	5	2	1	21	12	+9	17
Bulgaria	8	4	2	2	17	9	+8	14
Sweden	8	2	0	6	7	15	−8	6
Luxembourg	8	0	0	8	0	29	−29	0

- Sweden 0–2 England
- Bulgaria 2–2 Poland
- Poland 5–0 Luxembourg
- England 1–0 Bulgaria
- Bulgaria 2–1 Sweden
- Luxembourg 0–5 England
- England 5–0 Poland
- Sweden 3–0 Luxembourg
- Luxembourg 0–3 Bulgaria
- Poland 2–0 Sweden
- England 3–0 Sweden
- Poland 3–3 Bulgaria
- Bulgaria 0–1 England
- Luxembourg 0–4 Poland
- England 5–0 Luxembourg
- Sweden 1–4 Bulgaria
- Luxembourg 0–1 Sweden
- Poland 3–1 England
- Sweden 1–2 Poland
- Bulgaria 3–0 Luxembourg

England qualified as group winners
Poland qualified as one of the best runners-up

=== Group 6 ===
Team	Pld	W	D	L	GF	GA	GD	Pts
Spain	8	7	1	0	21	5	+16	22
Netherlands	8	6	0	2	17	8	+9	18
Israel	8	2	2	4	6	13	−7	8
Cyprus	8	1	3	4	7	18	−11	6
Austria	8	1	0	7	8	15	−7	3

- Austria 0–1 Israel
- Cyprus 1–3 Spain
- Cyprus 2–1 Austria
- Netherlands 3–0 Israel
- Israel 0–4 Spain
- Netherlands 3–2 Austria
- Cyprus 0–3 Netherlands
- Spain 4–0 Austria
- Israel 1–1 Cyprus
- Netherlands 0–1 Spain
- Austria 0–1 Netherlands
- Spain 4–1 Netherlands
- Israel 2–1 Austria
- Netherlands 5–1 Cyprus
- Austria 1–2 Spain
- Cyprus 1–1 Israel
- Israel 0–1 Netherlands
- Spain 1–1 Cyprus
- Austria 3–0 Cyprus
- Spain 2–1 Israel

Spain qualified as group winners
Netherlands qualified as one of the best runners-up

=== Group 7 ===
Team	Pld	W	D	L	GF	GA	GD	Pts
Slovakia	8	5	2	1	12	6	+6	17
Portugal	8	5	2	1	17	6	+11	17
Romania	8	3	3	2	10	8	+2	12
Hungary	8	2	0	6	12	16	−4	6
Azerbaijan	8	1	1	6	5	20	−15	4

- Slovakia 2–1 Azerbaijan
- Hungary 0–3 Portugal
- Azerbaijan 2–1 Hungary
- Portugal 1–1 Romania
- Slovakia 1–0 Portugal
- Hungary 1–2 Romania
- Portugal 5–0 Azerbaijan
- Romania 0–1 Slovakia
- Azerbaijan 0–2 Romania
- Slovakia 4–1 Hungary
- Portugal 1–1 Slovakia
- Romania 2–1 Hungary
- Hungary 3–0 Slovakia
- Romania 1–1 Azerbaijan
- Azerbaijan 0–2 Portugal
- Slovakia 0–0 Romania
- Hungary 4–1 Azerbaijan
- Romania 2–3 Portugal
- Azerbaijan 0–3 Slovakia
- Portugal 2–1 Hungary

Slovakia qualified as group winners
Portugal qualified as one of the best runners-up

=== Group 8 ===
Team	Pld	W	D	L	GF	GA	GD	Pts
Croatia	8	6	2	0	25	7	+18	20
FR Yugoslavia	8	5	2	1	29	10	+19	17
Republic of Ireland	8	4	2	2	13	12	+1	14
Malta	8	1	0	7	8	23	−15	3
Macedonia	8	1	0	7	2	25	−23	3

	(Croatia)	(Republic of Ireland)	(North Macedonia)	(Malta)	(Federal Republic of Yugoslavia)
Croatia	—	5–1	4–0	1–0	2–2
Republic of Ireland	2–2	—	3–0^{*}	2–1	0–2
Macedonia	0–2	0–1	—	1–0	0–8
Malta	0–3	1–3	5–1	—	1–5
FR Yugoslavia	2–6	1–1	2–0	7–0	—

Croatia qualified as group winners
FR Yugoslavia qualified as one of the best runners-up

=== Group 9 ===
Team	Pld	W	D	L	GF	GA	GD	Pts
Belgium	10	8	1	1	31	9	+22	25
Czech Republic	10	8	1	1	17	5	+12	25
Lithuania	10	5	1	4	14	10	4	16
Scotland	10	4	2	4	18	12	+6	14
Bosnia and Herzegovina	10	2	1	7	11	24	−13	7
Estonia	10	0	0	10	4	35	−31	0

- Lithuania 0–0 Scotland
- Bosnia and Herzegovina 3–2 Estonia
- Belgium 0–2 Czech Republic
- Lithuania 0–1 Belgium
- Bosnia and Herzegovina 0–0 Czech Republic
- Scotland 2–0 Estonia
- Lithuania 4–0 Bosnia and Herzegovina
- Czech Republic 3–0 Estonia
- Belgium 2–0 Scotland
- Scotland 2–2 Belgium
- Czech Republic 1–0 Lithuania
- Lithuania 4–1 Estonia
- Scotland 0–1 Czech Republic
- Belgium 4–0 Bosnia and Herzegovina
- Bosnia and Herzegovina 1–2 Lithuania
- Estonia 0–3 Czech Republic
- Czech Republic 3–2 Scotland
- Estonia 0–2 Lithuania
- Estonia 1–7 Belgium
- Belgium 5–0 Estonia
- Lithuania 0–2 Czech Republic
- Bosnia and Herzegovina 2–5 Scotland
- Belgium 3–0 Lithuania
- Czech Republic 1–0 Bosnia and Herzegovina
- Estonia 0–4 Scotland
- Bosnia and Herzegovina 3–4 Belgium
- Scotland 2–0 Bosnia and Herzegovina
- Czech Republic 1–3 Belgium
- Estonia 0–2 Bosnia and Herzegovina
- Scotland 1–2 Lithuania

Belgium qualified as group winners
Czech Republic qualified as one of the best runners-up

=== Ranking of second-placed teams ===
Because groups contained different number or teams (six and five), matches against the fifth and sixth-placed teams in each group were not included in the ranking. As a result, six matches played by each team counted for the purposes of the second-placed table. The top seven advanced to the play-off.

Grp	Team	Pld	W	D	L	GF	GA	GD	Pts
9	Czech Republic	6	5	0	1	10	5	+5	15
6	Netherlands	6	4	0	2	13	6	+7	12
4	Russia	6	4	0	2	9	5	+4	12
8	FR Yugoslavia	6	3	2	1	19	10	+9	11
7	Portugal	6	3	2	1	10	6	+4	11
5	Poland	6	3	2	1	12	12	0	11
2	Norway	6	3	1	2	9	5	+4	10
1	Switzerland	6	3	1	2	7	4	+3	10
3	Germany	6	2	1	3	5	7	−2	7

== Play-offs ==
Team 1	Agg.	Team 2	1st leg	2nd leg
Portugal	2–3	Croatia	2–0	0–3 (a.e.t.)
Norway	1–7	Spain	1–3	0–4
Czech Republic	3–1	Greece	3–0	0–1
England	3–0	FR Yugoslavia	3–0	—
Poland	2–2 (a)	Turkey	2–1	0–1
Russia	1–4	Slovakia	0–1	1–3
Netherlands	4–2	Belgium	2–2	2–0
France	2–3	Italy	1–1	1–2 (a.e.t.)
