= Dejan Dimitrovski =

Macedonian footballer

Personal information
- Full name: Dejan Dimitrovski
- Date of birth: 29 September 1979 (age 47)
- Place of birth: SFR Yugoslavia
- Height: 1.76 m (5 ft 9 1/2 in)
- Position: Defender

Senior career*
Years	Team	Apps	(Gls)
1999–2004	Cementarnica	93	(7)
2004	Pamisos Messini	3	(0)
2005–2006	Bregalnica	42	(5)
2006–2009	Shkëndija	23	(1)
2008	→ Besëlidhja (loan)	1	(0)
2009–2010	Bregalnica		

International career
2001–2002	Macedonia	6	(0)
- * Club domestic league appearances and goals

Dejan Dimitrovski (Macedonian: Дејан Димитровски; born 29 September 1979) is a retired football defender from North Macedonia, who last played for FK Bregalnica Štip. Throughout his career Dejan Dimitrovski was considered to be one of the best players in the Republic of North Macedonia and by the age of 21 he was already playing for the Macedonia national team.

== International career ==
He made his senior debut for Macedonia in a July 2001 friendly match against Qatar and has earned a total of 6 caps, scoring no goals. His final international was a January 2002 Bahrain Tournament match against Finland.

== External sources ==
- Dejan Dimitrovski at National-Football-Teams.com
