= Tomáš Došek =

Czech footballer

Personal information
- Date of birth: 12 September 1978 (age 48)
- Place of birth: Karlovy Vary, Czechoslovakia
- Height: 1.78 m (5 ft 10 in)
- Position: Forward

Youth career
- 1984–1995: TJ DDM Stará Role
- 1995–1997: FC Viktoria Plzeň
- 1997: TJ Přeštice

Senior career*
Years	Team	Apps	(Gls)
1996–1999	Viktoria Plzeň	44	(14)
1997	→ TJ Přeštice (loan)	15	(10)
1999–2004	Slavia Prague	136	(38)
2004–2005	Rapid Wien	28	(7)
2006	Artmedia Bratislava	3	(0)
2006–2007	Wisła Płock	17	(3)
2007–2011	Zbrojovka Brno	109	(24)
2012–2016	TJ Slavoj Koloveč		
2016–2018	FC Slovan Hlohovec		

International career
1998–2000	Czech Republic U21	23	(9)
2002–2003	Czech Republic	3	(0)
- * Club domestic league appearances and goals

Tomáš Došek (born 12 September 1978) is a Czech former professional footballer who played as a forward.

== Life and career ==
His twin brother Lukáš is also a former professional footballer. They played together at Slavia Prague from 1999 to 2004, and also at the international level for the Czech Republic under-21 team and the full national team.

== Honours ==
Slavia Prague

- Czech Cup: 2001–02

Rapid Wien

- Austrian Bundesliga: 2004–05

Wisła Płock

- Polish Super Cup: 2006

Individual

- Czech Talent of the Year: 1998
