= Ardian Đokaj =

Montenegrin footballer (born 1979)

Ardijan Đokaj
Personal information
- Date of birth: 23 May 1979 (age 47)
- Place of birth: Tuzi, SR Montenegro, SFR Yugoslavia
- Height: 1.79 m (5 ft 10 in)
- Position: Winger

Youth career
- Dečić

Senior career*
Years	Team	Apps	(Gls)
1997–1999	Budućnost Podgorica	19	(2)
1997–1998	→ Mladost Podgorica (loan)	20	(7)
1999–2000	Mallorca	6	(0)
2000–2001	Lleida	20	(2)
2001–2004	Obilić	72	(16)
2004	OFK Beograd	14	(5)
2005	Red Star Belgrade	22	(4)
2006–2007	Trabzonspor	9	(1)
2006–2007	→ Ankaraspor (loan)	6	(0)
2007–2009	TuS Koblenz	37	(12)
2009	1860 Munich	3	(0)
2010	Budućnost Podgorica	9	(2)
2010–2011	Mogren	19	(4)
Total		257	(55)

International career
2000	FR Yugoslavia U21 (Note: Only official UEFA matches included)	1	(0)
- * Club domestic league appearances and goals

Ardijan Đokaj (Montenegrin: Ардијан Ђокај, Albanian: Ardian Gjokaj; born 23 May 1979) is a Montenegrin former professional footballer who played as a winger.

== Club career ==
During his journeyman career, Đokaj played in Serbia and Montenegro, Spain, Turkey, and in the German second bundesliga for TuS Koblenz and 1860 Munich.

== Honours ==
Mogren

- Montenegrin First League: 2010–11
