= Morten Petersen =

Danish footballer (born 1978)

Personal information
- Full name: Morten Roald Petersen
- Date of birth: 27 May 1978 (age 48)
- Place of birth: Helsinge, Denmark
- Height: 1.85 m (6 ft 1 in)
- Position: Centre back

Senior career*
Years	Team	Apps	(Gls)
1997–2001	Lyngby BK	117	(1)
2001–2002	Livingston	3	(0)
2002–2004	AGF	56	(0)
2004–2011	Lyngby BK	94	(2)
- * Club domestic league appearances and goals

Morten Roald Petersen (born 27 May 1978) is a Danish retired football central defender who spent most of his career with Lyngby Boldklub. He has played several games for the Danish Under-21 and Under-19 national teams.

Petersen began his professional career in Lyngby in 1994, but left the club following its bankruptcy in December 2001. Since then he has played for Livingston F.C. and AGF, before returning to Lyngby, whom he has captained since the spring of 2005.
