= Nicola Ventola =

Italian footballer

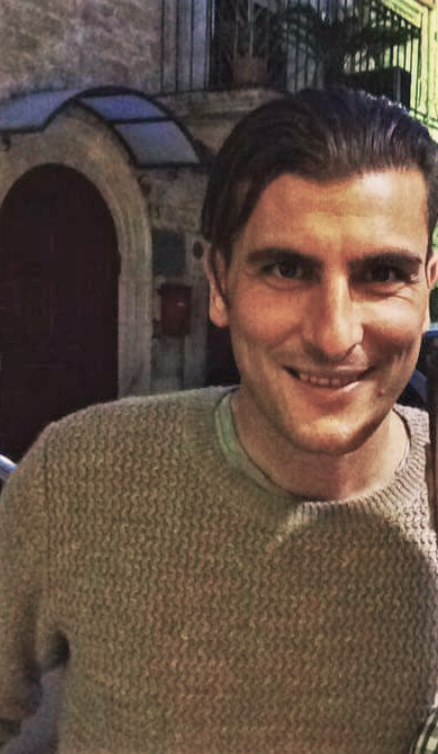
- Ventola in 2017

Personal information
- Date of birth: 24 May 1978 (age 48)
- Place of birth: Grumo Appula, Italy
- Height: 1.85 m (6 ft 1 in)
- Position: Forward

Youth career
- Bari

Senior career*
Years	Team	Apps	(Gls)
1994–1998	Bari	44	(12)
1998–1999	Inter Milan	21	(6)
1999–2000	Bologna	14	(0)
2000–2005	Inter Milan	16	(4)
2000–2001	→ Atalanta (loan)	28	(10)
2003–2004	→ Siena (loan)	28	(4)
2004–2005	→ Crystal Palace (loan)	3	(1)
2005–2007	Atalanta	64	(23)
2007–2009	Torino	35	(6)
2009–2011	Novara	26	(4)
Total		279	(70)

International career
1994	Italy U-17	2	(1)
1995	Italy U-18	4	(2)
1995–1996	Italy U-19	18	(14)
1996–2000	Italy U-21 / Olympic	25	(12)
- * Club domestic league appearances and goals

Nicola Ventola (born 24 May 1978) is an Italian former professional footballer who played as a forward. Ventola played for several clubs in Italy throughout his career, and also had a loan spell with English side Crystal Palace. At international level, he was a member of the Italian under-23 squad at the 2000 Summer Olympics in Sydney; he received his only senior call-up for Italy in 1998, although he did not come off the bench. At youth level, he also represented the Italy under-21 side, and was a member of the team that won the 2000 UEFA European Under-21 Championship, also winning a gold medal at the 1997 Mediterranean Games with the under-23 side. He retired from football in February 2011.

== Club career ==
Born in Grumo Appula, Bari, Nicola Ventola's career began with Bari in 1994 as a youth player. He made his Serie A debut on 6 November 1994 against Fiorentina, at the age of 16 and 166 days. He left the club in 1998 after three more seasons (one in Serie B, winning the 1996–97 title, and two in Serie A), after scoring 12 goals in 45 appearances with the club (ten of which were scored in Serie B and two in Serie A).

Ventola signed for Inter Milan during the 1998–99 season, making 21 appearances in the league, and scoring six goals, playing alongside other notable forwards, such as Ronaldo, Roberto Baggio, Iván Zamorano, Andrea Pirlo, and Youri Djorkaeff, albeit mainly as a substitute. During the season, he showed real star potential for his young age, scoring 11 goals in all competitions, as well as a goal against eventual European Cup winners Manchester United in the quarter-finals of the 1998–99 UEFA Champions League. However, exactly a year later he was signed on a co-ownership deal with Bologna (after Christian Vieri's £32 million transfer to Inter Milan from Lazio) and later Atalanta during the next two seasons, in a swap deal with Corrado Colombo. During his loan period with Bologna, he made 14 appearances in Serie A, without scoring a goal, although he managed four goals in seven appearances in the 1999–2000 Coppa Italia and the 1999–2000 UEFA Cup. With Atalanta, he had a more successful league season, scoring ten goals in 28 Serie A appearances during the 2000–01 season.

Ventola returned to Inter in 2001, but he suffered from several injuries that season, only making 16 appearances and scoring four goals in Serie A, as Inter narrowly missed out on the Serie A title; however, he bagged an impressive five goals in nine appearances in Europe, as Inter reached the semi-finals of the UEFA Cup, and finished the season with a total of ten goals in all competitions. The following season, he was not picked regularly for the first team, and he went on loan once again to Siena in 2003, where he made 28 appearances, scoring four goals during the 2003–04 season. Premier League side Crystal Palace signed him on transfer deadline day in August 2004 on a season-long loan, but this was wrecked by injury and he only made a handful of appearances. He did however score against Southampton on the penultimate day of the season; in total he made three appearances and scored one goal during the 2004–05 season.

In July 2005, Ventola signed a two-year contract with Atalanta. In his first season back at the club, he helped his team to win the 2005–06 Serie B title with his decisive goalscoring performances, scoring 15 goals in 35 appearances. He scored six goals in 29 games during the 2006–07 Serie A season, but he later became excluded from the club and his contract was not renewed. In total, he scored 35 goals for the club in 101 appearances between league and Coppa Italia matches over three seasons (two in Serie A and one in Serie B).

In June 2007, he joined Torino on a two-year contract. With Torino, he made 21 appearances, scoring four goals during his first season; during his second season he received less playing time, scoring two goals in 14 appearances. In Torino's 3–1 home loss against Lazio, he replaced Sereni in goal, who had been sent off, as Torino had already made three substitutions, failing to stop a Mauro Zárate penalty. At the end of the season, Torino were relegated to Serie B, and Ventola's contract was not renewed.

Ventola subsequently moved to Lega Pro team Novara, making his debut for the team on 9 November 2009, in a 3–0 win over Lecco. He scored his first goal on 17 January 2010, in a draw against Como. On 25 April, he scored a brace in a 3–3 draw against Cremonese, which allowed Novara to win promotion to Serie B. He retired on 27 January 2011, at the age of 33, due to persisting physical problems. In total, he score 90 career goals in 342 appearances in official competitions.

== International career ==
Ventola played his first competitive international match for the Italy national under-17 football team (made up of players born in and after 1977), in a 1994 UEFA European Under-16 Championship qualifying fixture; in total, he scored one goal in two appearances for the under-17 side, featuring as a substitute for Ivano Montanaro, and as a starter respectively. He also scored one goal in the group stage of the 1996 UEFA European Under-18 Championship for the Italy national under-19 football team, serving as the team's captain. After the team was eliminated, Ventola was immediately promoted to the Italy national under-21 football team as one of their youngest players. He made his debut for the Italy under-21 side on 3 October 1996, at the age of 18, in a 1998 UEFA European Under-21 Championship qualifying match, coming on as a substitute for Fabrizio Cammarata.

Ventola made 25 appearances with the Italy Under-21 and Under-23 sides, scoring 12 goals, winning the 1997 Mediterranean Games and the 2000 UEFA Under-21 European Championship with the team; he also represented Italy at the 2000 Summer Olympics, where they were eliminated in the quarter-finals of the tournament by eventual runners-up Spain.

Although he was never capped at senior level, he was called up by manager Dino Zoff to the Italian senior side for a Euro 2000 qualifying match against Switzerland, at the Stadio Friuli of Udine, on 10 October 1998, but remained on the bench as an unused substitute in the eventual 2–0 win.

== Style of play ==
Ventola was considered one of Bari's and Italy's most promising prospects in his youth, although he suffered many injuries throughout his career. His main attributes as a striker were his speed, power, heading ability, positional sense, eye for goal, and ability to provide depth to his team with his runs. Although he usually played as a central striker, he was also capable of playing in a deeper role as a second striker, due to his ability to link up with and create chances for his teammates.

== Personal life ==
Ventola has a son, Kelian (b. 22 September 2003), with his wife, Brazilian-born, Swiss-raised model Kartika Luyet. In 2013, Erick Thohir, Inter Milan's president at the time, stated that Ventola is his all-time favorite Inter player. Ventola lives in Dubai, where he works as a pundit for Abu Dhabi Media. His nephew Danilo Giacinto Ventola is now a professional footballer.

== Honours ==
Bari

- Serie B: 1996–97

Atalanta

- Serie B: 2005–06

Novara

- Lega Pro Prima Divisione: 2009–10 (Group A)
- Supercoppa di Lega Prima Divisione: 2010

Italy

- Mediterranean Games: 1997
- UEFA European Under-21 Championship: 2000
