= Lukáš Došek =

Czech footballer (born 1978)

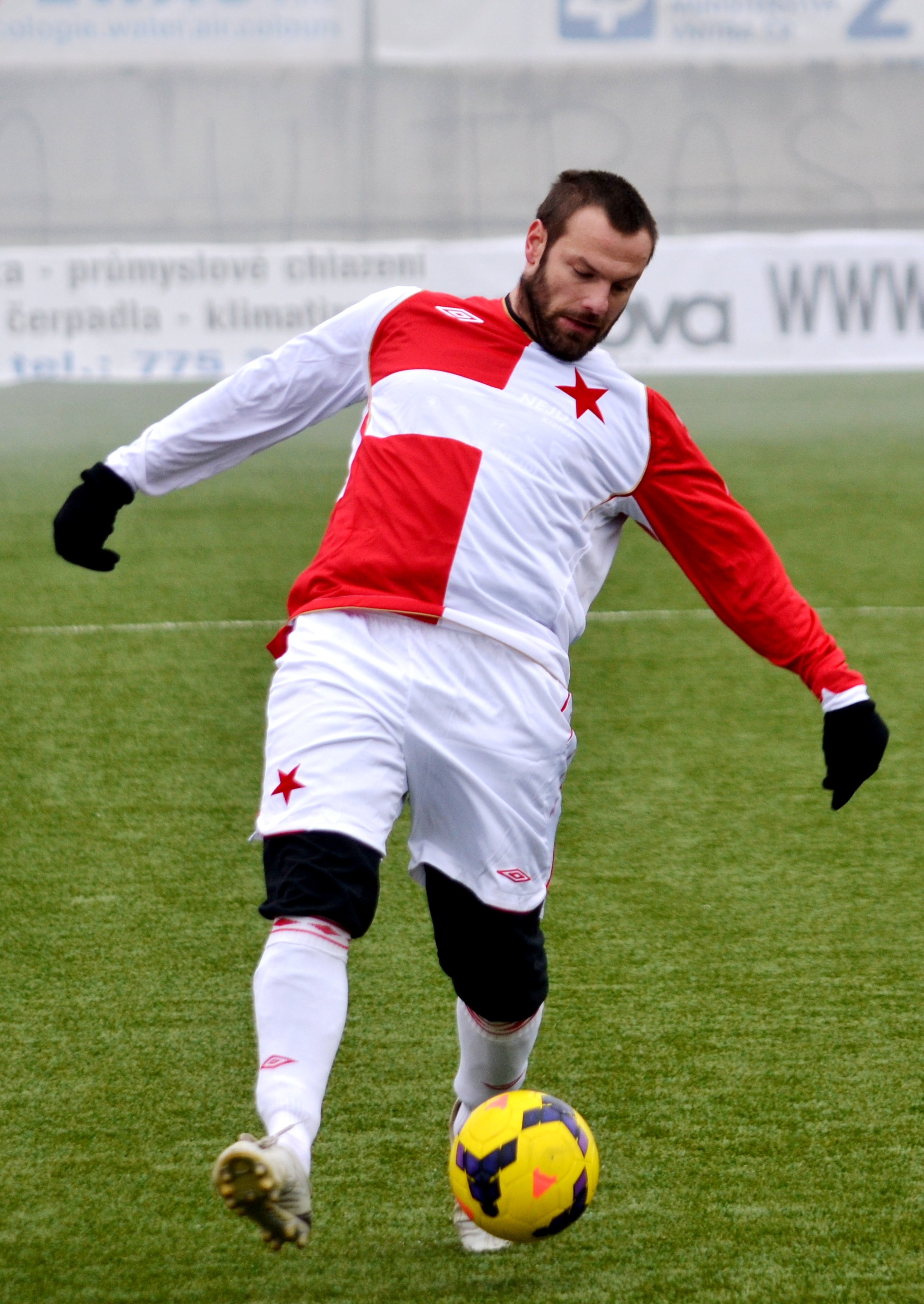

Personal information
- Full name: Lukáš Došek
- Date of birth: 12 September 1978 (age 48)
- Place of birth: Karlovy Vary, Czechoslovakia
- Height: 1.75 m (5 ft 9 in)
- Position: Right-back

Youth career
- 1984–1995: TJ DDM Stará Role
- 1995–1997: Viktoria Plzeň

Senior career*
Years	Team	Apps	(Gls)
1997–1999	Viktoria Plzeň	44	(0)
1999–2005	Slavia Prague	154	(4)
2005–2006	Sportfreunde Siegen	28	(0)
2006–2008	Thun	48	(2)
2008–2009	Spartak Trnava	23	(0)
Total		297	(6)

International career
2000	Czech U21 / Olympic		
2000–2002	Czech Republic	4	(0)
- * Club domestic league appearances and goals

Lukáš Došek (born 12 September 1978) is a Czech former professional footballer who played as a right-back. He played international football for the Czech Republic, making four appearances between 2000 and 2002. He was born in Karlovy Vary. He is the twin brother of Tomáš Došek.
